= Vinton Hayworth =

American actor (1906–1970)

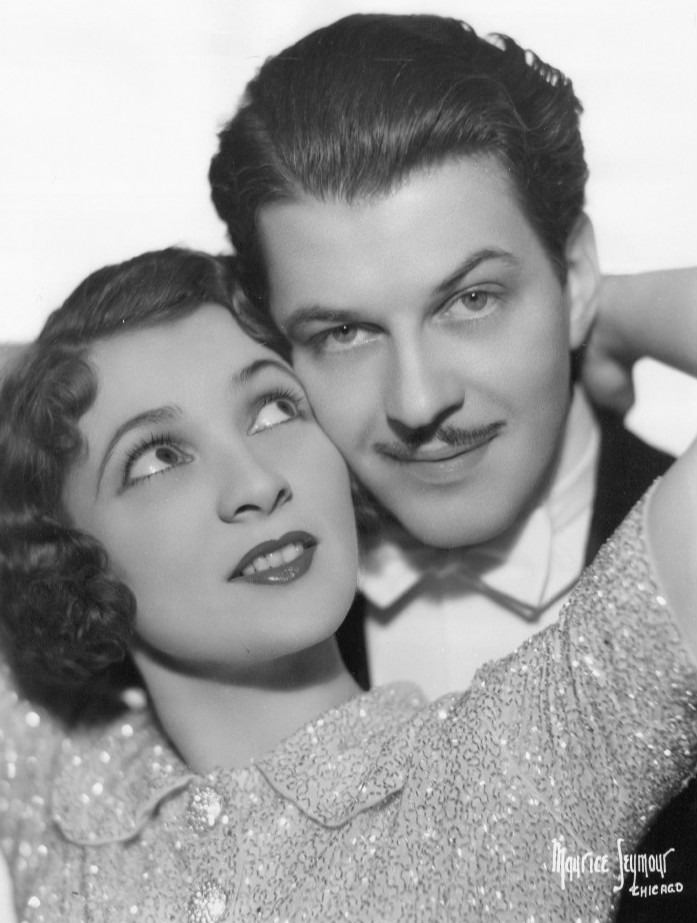
- Vinton as Jack Arnold with Donna Damerel as Marge Minter from the Myrt and Marge radio show, 1935
- Born: June 4, 1906; Washington, D.C., U.S.
- Died: May 21, 1970 (aged 63); Van Nuys, California, U.S.
- Other names: Jack Arnold; Vincent Haworth
- Occupations: Actor; playwright; screenwriter
- Years active: 1921–1970
- Spouse: Jean Owens
- Relatives: Volga Hayworth (sister); Eduardo Cansino, Sr. (brother-in-law); Rita Hayworth (niece); Ginger Rogers (niece by marriage); Phyllis Fraser (niece by marriage)

Vinton Hayworth (June 4, 1906 – May 21, 1970), also known as Jack Arnold and Vincent Haworth, (Note: Although some sources cite Vinton Hayworth's real surname as Haworth, the Haworth Association genealogy site includes an excerpt from the 1900 Census for Washington City, District of Columbia which clearly shows the surname as Hayworth. The genealogy site indicates that his great-grandfather changed the original name from Haworth to Hayworth.) was an American actor, playwright and screenwriter who began in weaselly and milquetoast roles and aged into dignified character parts. He appeared in over 90 films during his career, as well as on numerous television shows. Later audiences will recognize him from his final role as General Winfield Schaeffer in the fourth and fifth seasons of the sitcom I Dream of Jeannie. He was the uncle of Rita Hayworth, as well as being the uncle (by marriage) of Ginger Rogers.

== Career ==
Born in Washington, D.C., Hayworth began acting in his late teens. He was a pioneering radio announcer in the early 1920s, first in Washington, later in New York City, and then in Chicago. Subsequently, he appeared on numerous radio programs in various roles. He played Fred Andrews on Archie Andrews, was an announcer on Chaplain Jim, played Philip Roberts on It's Higgins, Sir, played Port on Lone Journey, played Alonzo Smith on Meet Me in St. Louis, and portrayed Jack Arnold on Myrt and Marge.

By 1933 he began to perform in films, still under the stage name Jack Arnold. He initially appeared on screen in small roles, often as comically good-natured, sneaky characters. He did, though, occasionally have larger parts, such costarring with Constance Worth and Leslie Fenton in China Passage (1937), a production in which he is billed as Vinton Haworth. His appearances credited as Jack Arnold ended in the early 1940s, and he did a two-year stint on Broadway from 1942 to 1944 before returning to California, where he continued to work in films into the 1960s.

Hayworth was also one of the founders of AFRA (later AFTRA), the union representing radio and television artists, of which he was also the president from 1951 to 1954.

Hayworth began to perform increasingly on television in the 1950s. In 1953–1954, he was an announcer on The Buick-Berle Show on NBC. He also appeared in a variety of roles on Alfred Hitchcock Presents, Gunsmoke, Perry Mason, Dennis the Menace (as Mr. Cramer in 1960 episode "Out of Retirement"), Petticoat Junction, Ripcord, Pistols 'n' Petticoats (one episode 1967), Hazel (6 episodes), The Munsters, Green Acres (1965) and Dick Tracy (1967). He played Magistrado Carlos Galindo on Disney's Zorro (1957–1959). His final role was as General Winfield Schaeffer on I Dream of Jeannie between 1969 and 1970. Hayworth replaced Barton MacLane, who had played General Martin Peterson until his death in 1969. Both Hayworth and MacLane died before the final episodes in which they appeared had been broadcast.

== Death ==
Hayworth died of a heart attack on May 21, 1970, at the age of 63, shortly after completing his recurring role of General Winfield Schaeffer in I Dream of Jeannie.

== Personal ==
Hayworth was married to actress Jean Owens, whose sister was Lela Emogene Owens, mother of actress Ginger Rogers. Another sister-in-law, Verda Virginia Clendenin (née Owens; formerly Brown Nichols), was the mother of actress Phyllis Fraser.

Hayworth's elder sister was Volga Hayworth, mother of screen star Rita Hayworth, making Vinton Hayworth maternal uncle of Rita Hayworth and uncle by marriage of Ginger Rogers and Phyllis Fraser.

== Partial filmography ==
- Enlighten Thy Daughter (1934) – Stanley Jordan
- Without Orders (1936) – Len Kendrick
- Night Waitress (1936) – George Skinner
- That Girl from Paris (1936) – Reporter (uncredited)
- We're on the Jury (1937) – Mr. M. Williams – Defense Attorney
- Sea Devils (1937) – Defense Counsel (uncredited)
- China Passage (1937) – Tommy Baldwin
- You Can't Buy Luck (1937) – Paul Vinette
- Riding on Air (1937) – Harvey Schumann
- Danger Patrol (1937) – Ed
- Hitting a New High (1937) – Carter Haig
- This Marriage Business (1938) – Attorney Lloyd Wilson
- Law of the Underworld (1938) – Eddie
- Vivacious Lady (1938) – Druggist (uncredited)
- Blind Alibi (1938) – Dirk
- Crime Ring (1938) – Buzzell
- Carefree (1938) – Elevator Operator (uncredited)
- Fugitives for a Night (1938) – Barrington (uncredited)
- Mr. Doodle Kicks Off (1938) – Henchman (uncredited)
- The Mad Miss Manton (1938) – Peter's Secretary (uncredited)
- A Man to Remember (1938) – Huber (uncredited)
- Tarnished Angel (1938) – Dan 'Dandy' Bennett
- Fixer Dugan (1939) – Frank Darlow
- When Tomorrow Comes (1939) – Radio Technician (uncredited)
- The Day the Bookies Wept (1939) – Harry, Rider with Margie
- Sued for Libel (1939) – Dr. James L. Bailer
- That's Right – You're Wrong (1939) – Producer (uncredited)
- Oh Johnny, How You Can Love (1940) – The Chaser
- Danger on Wheels (1940) – Bruce Crowley
- Framed (1940) – Nick
- Enemy Agent (1940) – Lester Taylor
- Love, Honor, and Oh Baby! (1940) – Man with Susan
- Cross-Country Romance (1940) – District Attorney J. Holmby (uncredited)
- Millionaires in Prison (1940) – 'Windy' Windsor
- Margie (1940) – Young Man (uncredited)
- Argentine Nights (1940) – Ship Officer (uncredited)
- Mexican Spitfire Out West (1940) – Mr. Brown (uncredited)
- Lucky Devils (1941) – Bradford
- The Saint in Palm Springs (1941) – Charlie – Desk Clerk (uncredited)
- Tight Shoes (1941) – Reporter (uncredited)
- Tillie the Toiler (1941) – Wally Whipple
- The Stork Pays Off (1941) – Todd Perry (uncredited)
- New York Town (1941) – Gentleman on Boat (uncredited)
- The Mexican Spitfire's Baby (1941) – Rudolph – the Hotel Clerk
- Two-Faced Woman (1941) – Guide (uncredited)
- Playmates (1941) – Radio Commentator (uncredited)
- To the Shores of Tripoli (1942) – Officer at Dance (uncredited)
- Juke Box Jenny (1942) – Brother Childs
- Junior G-Men of the Air (1942) – Flyer [Ch. 2] (uncredited)
- Spy Smasher (1942) – Camera Shop Clerk [Ch. 6] (uncredited)
- Saboteur (1942) – Will – Other Man in Movie (uncredited)
- You're Telling Me (1942) – Announcer (uncredited)
- There's One Born Every Minute (1942) – Photographer (uncredited)
- The Pride of the Yankees (1942) – Fraternity Boy (uncredited)
- Mexican Spitfire's Elephant (1942) – Parks, Hotel Regal Manager (uncredited)
- The Mummy's Tomb (1942) – Frank, Reporter (uncredited)
- Behind the Eight Ball (1942) – Bobby Leonard
- The Powers Girl (1943) – Announcer at Annual Preview (uncredited)
- It Comes Up Love (1943) – Photographer (uncredited)
- It Ain't Hay (1943) – Golfer (uncredited)
- Ladies' Day (1943) – Movie Director (uncredited)
- Backfire (1950) – Waiter (uncredited)
- Alfred Hitchcock Presents (1956) (Season 1 Episode 36: "Mink") - Sergeant Delaney
- The Girl He Left Behind (1956) – Arthur Shaeffer
- The Great Man (1956) – Charley Carruthers
- Gunsmoke (1957) (Season 3 Episode 3: “Blood Money") - Harry Speener
- Alfred Hitchcock Presents (1957) (Season 2 Episode 20: "Malice Domestic") - Dr. Ralph Wingate
- Alfred Hitchcock Presents (1957) (Season 2 Episode 34: "Martha Mason, Movie Star") - Mr. Abernathy
- Alfred Hitchcock Presents (1957) (Season 3 Episode 13: "Night of the Execution") - Sidney
- Spartacus (1960) – Metallius (uncredited)
- Police Dog Story (1961) – Harley A. Crenshaw – Police Commissioner
- Youngblood Hawke (1964) – Urban Webber (uncredited)
- Quick, Let's Get Married (1964) – Aguesta, Town Banker
- Chamber of Horrors (1966) – Judge Walter Randolph
