= Paul Guilfoyle (actor, born 1902) =

American actor (1902–1961)

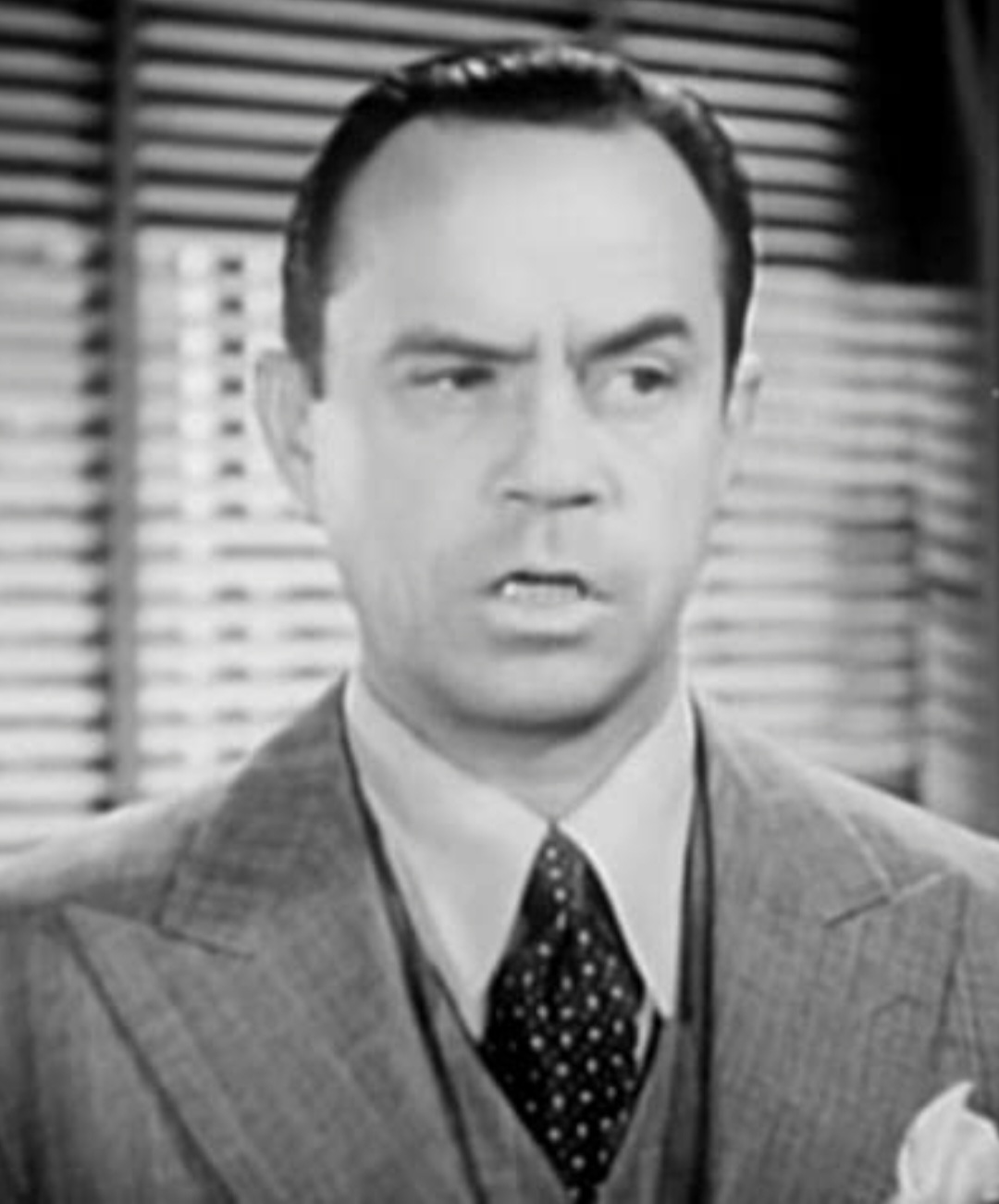
- Guilfoyle in The Missing Corpse (1945)
- Born: July 14, 1902; Jersey City, New Jersey, U.S.
- Died: June 27, 1961 (aged 58); Hollywood, Los Angeles, California, U.S.
- Resting place: Forest Lawn Memorial Park Cemetery, Glendale, California
- Occupations: Actor; director
- Years active: 1923–1961
- Spouse(s): Katherine Agatha Mulqueen (m. 1934)
- Children: Anthony Paul Guilfoyle (1936–1988)

Paul Guilfoyle (July 14, 1902 – June 27, 1961) was an American stage, film and television actor. Later in his career, he also directed films and television episodes.

== Biography ==
Guilfoyle was born in Jersey City, New Jersey.

He started by working on stage, performing on Broadway in 16 plays, beginning with The Jolly Roger and Cyrano de Bergerac in 1923 and ending with Jayhawker in 1934. He appeared in many films that starred Lee Tracy in the 1930s. In the 1949 crime film White Heat, he played (uncredited) a treacherous prison inmate trapped in the trunk of a car and then shot by James Cagney's lead character.

In 1950, Guilfoyle was arrested and charged with lewd vagrancy after making advances towards undercover vice officers in a North Hollywood park. He was a gay man, and was later entrapped and blackmailed by men pretending to be police officers who demanded sixty thousand dollars to keep the scandal out of the papers. Guilfoyle also struggled with alcoholism but overcame his addiction when he joined the motion picture branch of Alcoholics Anonymous. He became known as such a stirring speaker at his AA meetings that he was invited to speak at other AA meetings throughout the nation.

He died of a heart attack on June 27, 1961, in Hollywood. He had a son, Anthony. Guilfoyle was interred in Glendale, California's Forest Lawn Memorial Park Cemetery.

== Filmography ==
Year	Title	Role	Notes
1935	Special Agent	Williams - Quinn's Secretary	
1935	The Crime of Dr. Crespi	Dr. John Arnold	
1935	The Case of the Missing Man	Henchman Joe	Uncredited
1935	Escape from Devil's Island	Touvier	Uncredited
1935	Too Tough to Kill	Reporter	Uncredited
1936	You May Be Next	Navy Messenger	Uncredited
1936	Roaming Lady	Dr. Wong	
1936	Two-Fisted Gentleman	Gallagher	
1936	End of the Trail	Rough Rider	Uncredited
1936	Wanted! Jane Turner	Phil Crowley	
1936	Winterset	Garth Esdras	
1937	Sea Devils	Charlie - Radio Operator	Uncredited
1937	The Soldier and the Lady	Vasiley	
1937	The Woman I Love	Bertier	
1937	You Can't Buy Luck	Frank Bent	
1937	Behind the Headlines	Art Martin	
1937	You Can't Beat Love	Louie the Weasel	
1937	Super-Sleuth	Gibbons	
1937	The Big Shot	Minor Role	Scenes cut
1937	Hideaway	Norris	
1937	Flight from Glory	Jones	
1937	Fight for Your Lady	Jim Trask	
1937	Danger Patrol	Tim	
1937	Quick Money	Ambrose Ames	
1937	She's Got Everything	Hotel Manager	Uncredited
1938	Crashing Hollywood	Herman Tibbets	
1938	Double Danger	Taylor	
1938	Bringing Up Baby	Minor Role	Uncredited
1938	Maid's Night Out	P.X. Quinn - Bailbondsman	Uncredited
1938	This Marriage Business	Frankie Spencer	
1938	Law of the Underworld	Batsy	
1938	Blind Alibi	Taggart	
1938	The Saint in New York	Hymie Fanro	
1938	Sky Giant	'Fergie' Ferguson	
1938	I'm From the City	Willie	
1938	Carefree	Elevator Starter	Uncredited
1938	Fugitives for a Night	Monks	
1938	Mr. Doodle Kicks Off	O'Hara - Club Manager	Uncredited
1938	The Mad Miss Manton	Bat Regan	
1938	Tarnished Angel	Edward 'Eddie' Fox	
1938	The Law West of Tombstone	Bud McQuinn	
1939	Pacific Liner	Wishart	
1939	Boy Slaves	Truck Driver	Uncredited
1939	Society Lawyer	Murtock	
1939	Unexpected Father	Ed Stone - Sandy's Uncle	
1939	Heritage of the Desert	Snap Thornton	
1939	News Is Made at Night	Bat Randall	
1939	Our Leading Citizen	Jerry Peters	
1939	Sabotage	Steve Barsht	
1939	One Hour to Live	Stanley Jones	
1939	Thou Shalt Not Kill	Gordon Mavis	
1940	Remember the Night	District Attorney	
1940	Abe Lincoln in Illinois	Minor Role	Uncredited
1940	The Grapes of Wrath	Floyd	
1940	The Saint Takes Over	Clarence "Pearly" Gates	
1940	Brother Orchid	Red Martin	
1940	Millionaires in Prison	Ox	
1940	One Crowded Night	Jim	
1940	Wildcat Bus	Donovan	
1940	East of the River	Balmy	
1941	The Saint in Palm Springs	Clarence "Pearly" Gates	
1942	The Man Who Returned to Life	Clyde Beebe	
1942	Who Is Hope Schuyler?	Carl Spence	
1942	Time to Kill	Monaghan, Apartment Manager	Uncredited
1943	White Savage	Erik	
1943	Petticoat Larceny	Joe 'Tinhorn' Foster	
1943	The North Star	Iakin	Alternative title: Armored Attack
1943	Three Russian Girls	Trishin	
1944	It Happened Tomorrow	Shep	
1944	The Seventh Cross	Fiedler	
1944	The Master Race	Josef Katry	
1944	The Mark of the Whistler	'Limpy' Smith	
1945	The Missing Corpse	Andy McDonald	
1945	Why Girls Leave Home	Steve Raymond	
1946	The Scarlet Horseman	Jim Bannion (The Scarlet Horseman)	
1946	The Virginian	Shorty	
1946	Sweetheart of Sigma Chi	Frankie	
1947	Sinbad the Sailor	Camel Drover	Uncredited
1947	The Millerson Case	Jud Rookstool	
1947	Second Chance	Nick	
1947	Messenger of Peace	Peter Kerl	
1947	Roses Are Red	George "Buster" Cooley	
1948	Trouble Preferred	Baby Face Charlie	
1949	A Woman's Secret	Radio Program Moderator	Uncredited
1949	The Judge	William Jackson	
1949	Miss Mink of 1949	Uncle Newton	
1949	Follow Me Quietly	Overbeck	
1949	Mighty Joe Young	Smith	
1949	White Heat	Roy Parker	Uncredited
1949	I Married a Communist	Ralston	Alternative title: The Woman on Pier 13
1949	There's a Girl in My Heart	Father Callahan	
1950	Davy Crockett, Indian Scout	Ben	
1950	Bomba and the Hidden City	Hassan	
1951	When I Grow Up	Doc	
1951	Journey Into Light	Fanatic	
1952	Japanese War Bride	Soldier	Uncredited
1952	Actor's and Sin	Mr. Blue	Segment "Woman of Sin"
1952	Confidence Girl	William Pope	Uncredited
1953	Julius Caesar	Citizen of Rome #1	
1953	Captain Scarface		Director
1953	The Body Beautiful	Investigator	
1953	Torch Song	Monty Rolfe	
1953	The Diamond Queen	Guide	
1954	The Golden Idol	Prince Ali Ben Mamoud	
1954	A Life at Stake		Director
1954	Apache	Santos	
1955	Chief Crazy Horse	Worm	
1955	Not as a Stranger	Mr. Burke	Uncredited
1955	Trial	Cap Grant	
1960	The Boy and the Pirates	Snipe	
1960	Tess of the Storm Country		Director

== Television credits ==
Year	Title	Role	Notes
1952-1953	Racket Squad	–	Director; 2 episodes
1952-1953	Space Patrol	Brunner	2 episodes
1954	The Public Defender	–	Director; 2 episodes
1955	Waterfront	–	Director; Episode "Sea Explorers"
1955-1957	Highway Patrol	–	Director; 9 episodes
1956-1957	Dr. Christian	–	Director; 6 episodes
1955-1957	Science Fiction Theatre	–	Director; 15 episodes
1956-1957	Sheriff of Cochise	–	Director; 7 episodes
1957	Captain David Grief	Lascaux	Episode "The Canvas Treasures of Kierke Isle"
1957	Men of Annapolis	–	Director; 5 episodes
1958	Official Detective	–	Director; 5 episodes
1958	Tombstone Territory	–	Director; Episode "Fight for a Fugitive"
1959	Lock Up	–	Director; Episode "The Harry Connors Story"
1959	Colt .45	–	Director; 2 episodes
1959	Sugarfoot	–	Director; Episode "The Gaucho"
1959-1960	Lawman	–	Director; 2 episodes
1960	Sea Hunt	–	Director; 2 episodes
1960	Gunsmoke	Reverend	Episode "Shooting Stopover"; Final appearance
