= Eduardo Ciannelli =

Italian singer and actor (1888–1969)

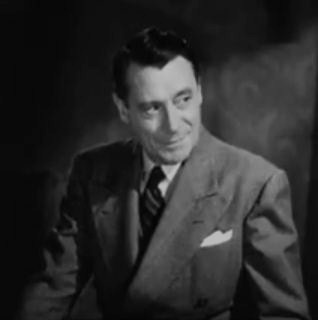
- Ciannelli in Dillinger (1945)
- Born: 30 August 1888; Ischia, Kingdom of Italy
- Died: 8 October 1969 (aged 81); Rome, Italy
- Resting place: Cimitero Flaminio, Rome, Italy
- Other name: Edward Ciannelli
- Occupations: Singer, actor
- Years active: 1917–1969
- Spouse: Alma Wolfe (m. 1918; died 1968)
- Children: 2

Eduardo Ciannelli (30 August 1888 – 8 October 1969) was an Italian baritone and character actor with a long career in American films, mostly playing gangsters and criminals. He was sometimes credited as Edward Ciannelli.

== Early life ==
Ciannelli was born in Lacco Ameno, on the island of Ischia, where his father, a doctor, owned a health spa. He studied surgery at the University of Naples, and worked briefly as a doctor, but his love of grand opera and the dramatic stage won out and he became a successful baritone, singing at La Scala and touring Europe.

He went to the United States from the Port of Naples as a first cabin saloon passenger on board the steamship San Guglielmo, which arrived at the Port of New York on 19 March 1914.

== Career ==
=== Theatre ===
In New York, Ciannelli appeared on Broadway in Oscar Hammerstein II's first musical Always You and later in Rose-Marie. He appeared in Theatre Guild productions in the late 1920s, co-starring with the Lunts (Alfred Lunt and Lynn Fontanne), and Katharine Cornell. During that period, he appeared in Uncle Vanya, The Inspector General, and The Front Page. In 1935, he played Trock Estrella in Maxwell Anderson's Winterset on Broadway and repeated his performance in the film version (1936). He played Cauchon in Shaw's Saint Joan in 1936, after which he left Broadway permanently, except for one notable occasion when he returned to play in Dore Schary's play The Devil's Advocate in 1961, for which he received a nomination for the Tony Award for Best Featured Actor.

=== Film ===
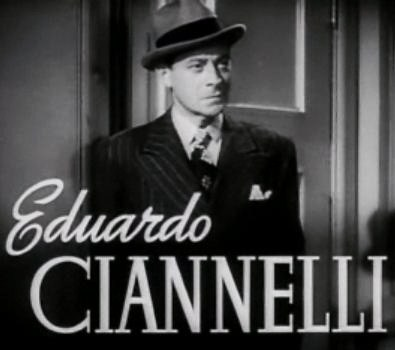
Trailer for Society Lawyer (1939)

Ciannelli's Hollywood career consists of close to 150 film and television appearances. Notable among these are Marked Woman (1937) with Bette Davis, Strange Cargo (1940) with Joan Crawford and Clark Gable, and perhaps his most famous role, as the fanatical Thuggee guru in Gunga Din (1939) with Cary Grant. In the 1940 serial Mysterious Doctor Satan, he played the villain, an evil scientist with an army of robots.

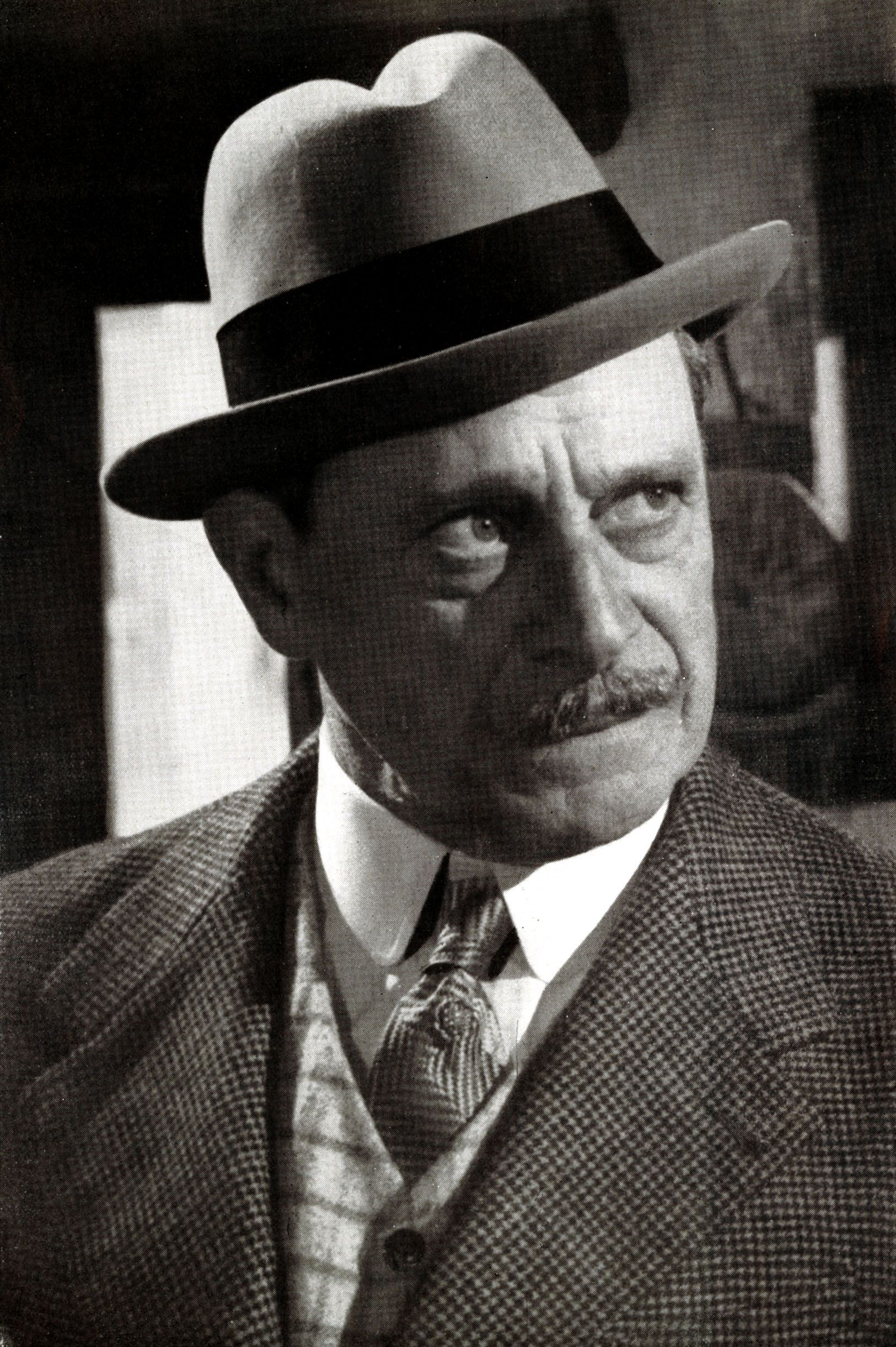
Ciannelli in Cineguida 54

In the 1950s and throughout the 1960s, he divided his time among U.S. films, including Houseboat (1958), The Visit (1964), The Chase (1966) with Marlon Brando, and The Secret of Santa Vittoria (1969), with Anthony Quinn and Anna Magnani, and Italian films such as The City Stands Trial, directed by Luigi Zampa, Attila (1954) with Anthony Quinn and Sophia Loren, and Helen of Troy (1956).

=== Television ===
Ciannelli appeared in American TV shows such as Climax Mystery Theater, The Time Tunnel, Perry Mason, Alfred Hitchcock Presents, Johnny Staccato, The Detectives Starring Robert Taylor, and Dr. Kildare.

== Personal life and death ==
Ciannelli was married to Alma Wolfe from 1918 until her death in 1968. They had two sons, Eduardo and Lewis E. Ciannelli, who is also an actor.

Ciannelli died in Rome on 8 October 1969, at the age of 81, and was interred in the Cimitero Flaminio there.

== Filmography ==
Year	Film	Role	Director	Notes
1917	The Food Gamblers	The Italian	Albert Parker	
1931	Così è la vita			
1933	Reunion in Vienna	Pofferoff aka Poffy	Sidney Franklin	
1935	The Scoundrel	Maurice Stern	Charles MacArthur	
1936	Winterset	Trock Estrella		
1937	Criminal Lawyer	Larkin	Jimmy Anderson (assistant)	
1937	Marked Woman	Johnny Vanning	Michael Curtiz	
1937	The League of Frightened Men	Paul Chapin	Alfred E. Green	
1937	The Girl from Scotland Yard	Franz Jorg	Robert G. Vignola	
1937	Super-Sleuth	Professor Herman	Ben Stoloff	
1937	On Such a Night	Ice Richmond	Ewald André Dupont	
1937	Hitting a New High	Andreas Mazzini	Raoul Walsh	
1938	Law of the Underworld	Rocky	Lew Landers	
1938	Blind Alibi	Mitch	Lew Landers	
1939	Risky Business	Philip Decarno	Arthur Lubin	
1939	Gunga Din	Guru	George Stevens	
1939	Society Lawyer	Jim Crelliman	Edwin L. Marin	
1939	Bulldog Drummond's Bride	Henri Armides	James P. Hogan	
1939	The Angels Wash Their Faces	Martino	Ray Enright	
1940	Strange Cargo	Telez	Frank Borzage	
1940	Outside the Three-Mile Limit	Dave Reeves	Lewis D. Collins	
1940	Zanzibar	Koski	Harold Schuster	
1940	Forgotten Girls	Gorno	Phil Rosen	
1940	Foreign Correspondent	Mr. Krug	Alfred Hitchcock	
1940	The Mummy's Hand	The High Priest	Christy Cabanne	
1940	Mysterious Doctor Satan	Doctor Satan		As "Edward Cianneli"
1940	Kitty Foyle	Giono	Sam Wood	
1941	Ellery Queen's Penthouse Mystery	Count Brett	James P. Hogan	
1941	Sky Raiders	Felix Lynx	Ray Taylor	
1941	They Met in Bombay	Giovanni Riccio, Hotel Manager	Clarence Brown	
1941	I Was a Prisoner on Devil's Island	Dr. Victor Martel	Lew Landers	
1941	Paris Calling	Mouche	Edwin L. Marin	
1942	Dr. Broadway	Vic Telli	Anthony Mann	
1942	Cairo	Ahmed Ben Hassan	W. S. Van Dyke	
1942	You Can't Escape Forever	Boss Greer	Jo Graham	
1943	For Whom the Bell Tolls	Johnny Salvini	Sam Wood	Uncredited
1943	They Got Me Covered	Baldanacco	David Butler	
1943	The Constant Nymph	Roberto	Edmund Goulding	
1943	Adventures of the Flying Cadets	Kurt von Helger, alias Corby	Ray Taylor	
1944	Passage to Marseille	Chief Engineer	Michael Curtiz	
1944	The Mask of Dimitrios	Marukakis	Jean Negulesco	
1944	The Conspirators	Police Colonel Almeida	Jean Negulesco	
1944	Storm Over Lisbon	Blanco	George Sherman	
1945	Dillinger	Marco Minelli	Max Nosseck	
1945	A Bell for Adano	Maj. Nasta	Henry King	
1945	Incendiary Blonde	Nick the Greek	George Marshall	
1945	Crime Doctor's Warning	Nick Petroni	William Castle	Uncredited
1946	Gilda	Cartel Member	Charles Vidor	Uncredited
1946	Perilous Holiday	Señor Aguirre	Edward H. Griffith	
1946	The Wife of Monte Cristo	Jacques Antoine	Edgar G. Ulmer	
1946	Heartbeat	Baron Ferdinand Dvorak	Sam Wood	
1946	Joe Palooka, Champ	Florini	Reginald LeBorg	
1947	California	Padre	John Farrow	
1947	Seven Keys to Baldpate	Cargan	Lew Landers	
1947	The Lost Moment	Father Rinaldo	Martin Gabel	
1947	The Crime Doctor's Gamble	Maurice Duval	William Castle	
1947	Rose of Santa Rosa	Don José de Garfias	Ray Nazarro	
1948	I Love Trouble	John Vega Caprillo	S. Sylvan Simon	
1948	On Our Merry Way	Maxim	King Vidor	
1948	To the Victor	Firago	Delmer Daves	
1948	The Creeper	Dr. Van Glock	Jean Yarbrough	
1949	Prince of Foxes	Art Dealer	Henry King	Uncredited
1950	Volcano	Giulio	William Dieterle	
1950	Fugitive Lady	Ralph Clementi		
1950	Pact with the Devil	Giacomo Mola	Luigi Chiarini	
1950	The Fighting Men	Barone Occhipinti	Roberto Savarese	
1950	Rapture	Arnaldo	Goffredo Alessandrini	
1951	The People Against O'Hara	Sol 'Knuckles' Lanzetta	John Sturges	
1951	It's Love That's Ruining Me	Capo delle spie	Mario Soldati	
1952	Lieutenant Giorgio	Barone di Polia	Raffaello Matarazzo	
1952	The City Stands Trial	Alfonso Navona	Luigi Zampa	
1952	Prisoners of Darkness	Marchese Rionero	Enrico Bomba	
1953	Voice of Silence		G. W. Pabst	
1953	Sul ponte dei sospiri	Inquisitore		
1953	I Vinti	Claudio's father	Michelangelo Antonioni	
1953	The Ship of Condemned Women	Michele	Raffaello Matarazzo	
1954	The Stranger's Hand	Dr. Vivaldi	Mario Soldati	
1954	Mambo	Il padre di Giovanna	Robert Rossen	
1954	Uomini ombra	Ammiraglio Zora		
1954	Attila	Onegesius, counsellor to Attila	Pietro Francisci	
1954	Proibito	Vescovo	Mario Monicelli	
1954	La tua donna	Public Prosecutor	Giovanni Paolucci	
1955	New Moon	don Giuseppe	Luigi Capuano	
1956	Helen of Troy	Andros	Robert Wise	
1956	I Love Lucy	Mr. Martinelli		
1957	Il ricatto di un padre	Alessandro Arlandi		
1957	Monster from Green Hell	Mahri	Kenneth G. Crane	
1958	Tumulto de Paixões			
1958	Houseboat	Arturo Zaccardi	Melville Shavelson	
1959	Wagon Train	Clyrio Soriano		
1962	The Untouchables	Gregory Pindar / Joe Genna		
1962–1965	Insight	Friedrich Nietzsche / Prisoner		
1964	The Visit	Innkeeper	Bernhard Wicki	
1964	Grand Canyon Massacre	Eric Dancer	Stanley Corbett	
1966	The Chase	Party Guest	Arthur Penn	Uncredited
1966	The Man from U.N.C.L.E.	Arturo 'Fingers' Stilletto / Carlo Farenti		
1967	The Time Tunnel	Count Enrico Galba		
1967	The Spy in the Green Hat	Arturo 'Fingers' Stilletto	Joseph Sargent	
1968	The Brotherhood	Don Peppino	Martin Ritt	
1969	Mackenna's Gold	Prairie Dog	J. Lee Thompson	
1969	Stiletto	Don Andrea	Bernard L. Kowalski	
1969	The Secret of Santa Vittoria	Luigi	Stanley Kramer	
1969	Boot Hill	Judge Boone	Giuseppe Colizzi	
1970	The Syndicate: A Death in the Family	Parker	Piero Zuffi	Released posthumously (final film role)

== Selected Television ==
Year	Title	Role	Notes
1958	Have Gun – Will Travel	Renato Donatello	Season 1 Episode 23: "Bitter Wine"
1959	Have Gun – Will Travel	The Father	Season 2 Episode 39: "Gold and Brimstone"
1962	Alfred Hitchcock Presents	Priest	Season 7 Episode 19: "Strange Miracle"
1962	Alfred Hitchcock Presents	Mr. Marino	Season 7 Episode 20: "The Test"
