= Flight from Glory =

1937 film by Lew Landers

- Theatrical release poster
- Directed by: Lew Landers
- Screenplay by: David Silverstein and John Twist
- Based on: story by Robert D. Andrews
- Produced by: Robert Sisk
- Starring: Chester Morris; Whitney Bourne; Onslow Stevens; Van Heflin
- Cinematography: Nicholas Musuraca, ASC
- Edited by: Harry Marker
- Music by: none credited
- Production company: A Radio Picture
- Distributed by: RKO Radio Pictures Inc.
- Release date: August 20, 1937
- Running time: 67 minutes
- Country: United States
- Language: English

Flight from Glory is an American drama movie about a run-down air cargo company in the Andes. It was directed by Lew Landers, and starred Chester Morris, Whitney Bourne, Onslow Stevens and Van Heflin. When released on August 20, 1937, Flight from Glory was considered one of the films that broke new ground in "pioneering airline sagas", comparing favorably to big-budget features such as 1936's Thirteen Hours by Air.

== Plot ==
Ellis (Onslow Stevens) runs Trans-Andean Air Service, a run-down company transporting supplies from Delgado, a tiny, remote outpost, over the Andes Mountains to some mines. To save money, Ellis uses worn-out aircraft and "black sheep" pilots and crew no one else will employ. He hires George Wilson (Van Heflin), and is surprised when he brings his new wife, Lee (Whitney Bourne). Chief pilot Paul Smith (Chester Morris) tries to get her to leave, but the Wilsons have no money. As time goes on, George proves to be a drunk. Paul protects him as best he can, as he has fallen in love with Lee. She eventually confesses that she loves him.

After Hanson (Richard Lane), an experienced pilot dies in a crash witnessed by George, he begins to crack up. When George is too drunk to fly, Garth Hilton (Douglas Walton) takes his place and is killed in yet another crash. Distraught and seeking revenge, George then forces Ellis at gunpoint into an aircraft and takes off. In the mountains, George jumps to his death, leaving Ellis to die like too many others he had hired. Smith is left to take over, but decides to join Lee and leave together. "Mousey" Mousialovitch (Solly Ward), the chief mechanic and former pilot, takes over the operation, with the mine owners promising new aircraft will be delivered.

== Cast ==
- Chester Morris as Paul Smith
- Whitney Bourne as Lee Wilson
- Onslow Stevens as Ellis
- Van Heflin as George Wilson
- Richard Lane as Hanson
- Paul Guilfoyle as Jones
- Solly Ward as "Mousey" Mousialovitch
- Douglas Walton as Garth Hilton
- Walter Miller as "Old Timer"
- Rita LaRoy as Molly, the cook
- Pasha Khan as Pepi

== Production ==
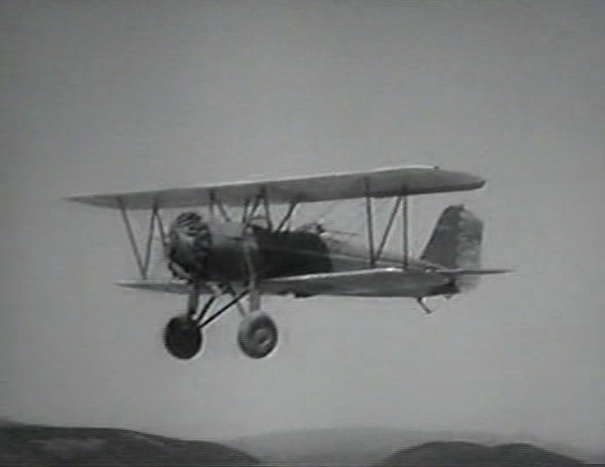
In Flight from Glory, Hollywood stunt pilot Paul Mantz provided a spirited "beat-up" of the airfield in his Boeing Model 100.

Flight from Glory was directed by B-movie specialist Lew Landers, who would eventually helm nine aviation films for RKO Radio Pictures. Flight from Glory was one of a series of aircraft-themed adventure films, such as Air Hostess (1933), Without Orders (1936), The Man Who Found Himself (1937), Sky Giant (1938) and Arctic Flight (1952). Chester Morris also appeared in nine aviation-themed films. (Note: The RKO ranch backlot stood in for the Andes setting in Flight from Glory.)

Flight from Glory was primarily filmed from late-June to early-July 1937. Preston Foster was first slated for the role of "Ellis" while Chester Morris had to be obtained on loan to RKO. Flight from Glory was also one of the early films that featured Van Heflin, who was being groomed for stardom by appearing in low-budget B-features. After starring in Broadway, Heflin had made his first screen appearance opposite Katharine Hepburn in A Woman Rebels (1936).

Aircraft used in the production included: Boeing Model 100,de Havilland DH.4, Fairchild 24 and Stearman C3.

== Reception ==
Later film reviewer Dennis Schwartz considered Flight from Glory as "a low-budget programmer fighting for elevation, that's not bad considering not much is expected." Aviation film historian James Farmer described Flight from Glory, as "(a) pulpish, predictable yarn" and disparaged the use of "... Crashes, Crashes, Crashes!"
