= Whitney Bourne =

American actress

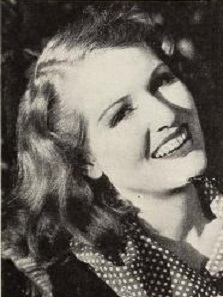
- Born: May 6, 1914; New York, New York, U.S.
- Died: December 24, 1988 (aged 74); Boston, Massachusetts, U.S.
- Other name: Whitney Bourne Atwood
- Occupation: Actress
- Years active: 1934–1939 (film)
- Spouses: Stanton Griffis (m. 1939; div. 1940) Arthur Osgood Choate jr (m. 1946; div. 1949) (1 son) Roy Atwood (m. 1956; died 1963)
- Children: 1
- Relatives: Frederick Gilbert Bourne (grandfather)

Whitney Bourne (May 6, 1914 – December 24, 1988) was an American stage and film actress. She was a leading lady in several B films of the 1930s, with occasional appearances in more prestigious films such as the British musical Head over Heels. During WWII, she was an American Red Cross clubmobiler.

== Early years ==
Bourne was the daughter of Mr. and Mrs. George G. Bourne. Her grandfather was businessman Frederick Gilbert Bourne.

== Career ==
Bourne's first work on Broadway was as an understudy in Eight Bells. Her other work on Broadway included portraying Ann in Firebird (1932), Annie Brown in John Brown (1934), Alice Whitridge in O Evening Star (1936), and a party guest in Case of Clyde Griffiths (1936).

Bourne's film debut came as leading lady in Flight From Glory. Other films in which she appeared included Double Danger, Love in a Basement, and The Mad Miss Manton. On August 15, 1937, he joined other stars from Flight from Glory to re-enact some scenes from the film on the radio program The Magic Key of RCA.

== Personal life ==
Bourne married Stanton Griffis on July 19, 1939, in Locust Valley, Long Island. They were divorced on October 23, 1940, with Bourne resuming use of her maiden name. On July 3, 1946, Bourne married Arthur Osgood Choate Jr. in Locust Valley. They had a son, and their marriage ended in 1949. On February 4, 1956, Bourne married stockbroker Roy F. Atwood in North Conway, New Hampshire.

== Selected filmography ==
- Crime Without Passion (1934)
- Once in a Blue Moon (1935)
- Head over Heels (1937)
- Flight from Glory (1937)
- Living on Love (1937)
- Blind Alibi (1938)
- Double Danger (1938)
- The Mad Miss Manton (1938)
- Beauty for the Asking (1939)

== Bibliography ==
- Goble, Alan. The Complete Index to Literary Sources in Film. Walter de Gruyter, 1999.
