= Stanton Griffis =

American diplomat and businessman (1887-1974)

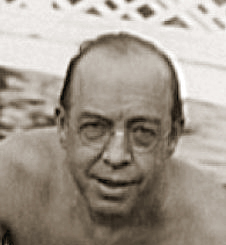

45th United States Ambassador to Spain
- In office March 1, 1951 – January 28, 1952
- President: Harry S. Truman
- Preceded by: Norman Armour
- Succeeded by: Lincoln MacVeagh

30th United States Ambassador to Argentina
- In office November 17, 1949 – September 23, 1950
- President: Harry S. Truman
- Preceded by: James Cabell Bruce
- Succeeded by: Ellsworth Bunker

United States Ambassador to Egypt
- In office September 2, 1948 – March 18, 1949
- President: Harry S. Truman
- Preceded by: Somerville Pinkney Tuck
- Succeeded by: Jefferson Caffery

United States Ambassador to Poland
- In office July 9, 1947 – April 21, 1948
- President: Harry S. Truman
- Preceded by: Arthur Bliss Lane
- Succeeded by: Waldemar J. Gallman

Personal details
- Born: May 2, 1887 Boston, Massachusetts, U.S.
- Died: August 29, 1974 (aged 87) Manhattan, New York, U.S.
- Spouse(s): Dorothea Nixon (m. 1912; div. 1937) Whitney Bourne (m. 1939; div. 1940) Elizabeth Blakemore (m. 1973; died 1974)
- Education: Cornell University

Stanton Griffis (May 2, 1887 – August 29, 1974) was an American businessman and diplomat.

== Life ==
Born in Boston, he earned a bachelor's degree from Cornell University in 1910. He headed to Jackson County, Oregon, enticed by the "orchard boom" in the Rogue River Valley.

Griffis began his business career in 1919 after serving the Army General Staff with the rank of captain during World War I. While with Hemphill, Noyes & Co., Griffis financed Adolf Kroch's acquisition of Brentano's in 1933. He also helped the Atlas Corporation manage Madison Square Garden. Griffis was named a trustee of Cornell in 1930 and led Paramount Pictures from 1935 to 1942. He became involved with diplomacy and non-governmental organizations during World War II, serving as special envoy to several western European nations from 1942 to 1943, and directing the Motion Picture Bureau, a division of the Office of War Information, between 1943 and 1944. In a subsequent two-month stint as diplomatic representative, Griffis tried to dissuade Swedish manufacturers of ball bearings from exporting to Germany. Upon his return to the United States, Griffis was named leader of the American Red Cross in the Asia-Pacific. For aiding the World War II war effort, he received the Medal for Merit and the Medal of Freedom.

Griffis was appointed the United States Ambassador to Poland in May 1947 by President Harry S. Truman. Griffis stepped down in April 1948 and was named ambassador to Egypt shortly thereafter, serving until March 1949. Truman named Griffis ambassador to Argentina later that year. He remained in that position until 1950, and succeeded chargé d'affaires Paul T. Culbertson as ambassador to Spain in 1951. Before leaving Spain in January 1952, Griffis was awarded the Knight of the Grand Cross of the Order of Charles III.

== Family ==
Stanton Griffis was the second child born to William Elliot Griffis. He had an elder sister Lillian, and a younger brother John Elliot Griffis, a composer. Stanton Griffis' marriage to Dorothea Nixon began in 1912 and ended in 1937, after a divorce. His second marriage, to actress Whitney Bourne, was his shortest. Griffis married Elizabeth Blakemore in 1973. His son, Nixon Griffis, and daughter, Theodora Griffis Latouche, both worked for Hemphill, Noyes & Co. for a time. Theodora died of cancer at the age of 40, in 1956. Stanton Griffis died in 1974 of pneumonia while being treated for burns and smoke inhalation at Lenox Hill Hospital. After selling Brentano's to the Crowell-Collier Publishing Company, Nixon left his business career and became a conservationist. Nixon Griffis died in 1993, aged 76.
