= Sky Giant =

1938 film by Lew Landers

- Theatrical film poster
- Directed by: Lew Landers
- Written by: Lionel Hauser (screenplay and story)
- Produced by: Robert Sisk
- Starring: Richard Dix; Chester Morris; Joan Fontaine
- Cinematography: Nicholas Musuraca
- Edited by: Harry Marker
- Music by: Roy Webb
- Production company: RKO Radio Pictures
- Distributed by: RKO Radio Pictures
- Release date: July 22, 1938
- Running time: 80-81 minutes
- Country: United States
- Language: English
- Budget: $181,000
- Box office: $518,000

Sky Giant, also known as Ground Crew and Northern Flight, is a 1938 drama film directed by Lew Landers. The film stars Richard Dix, Chester Morris and Joan Fontaine. The plot revolves around a love triangle with two pilots in love with the same woman.

== Plot ==
Upon reaching retirement age, Colonel Cornelius Stockton (Harry Carey) is forced to leave the US military, accepting a job running the Trans-World Air Lines School of Aeronautics in Glendale, California. "Stag" Cahill (Richard Dix), an old friend from the war, is the pilot on the commercial airliner taking him to Glendale. The colonel asks him to join the school staff, but Stag would rather fly. When the colonel arranges for Stag, a reservist, to be recalled to active duty, he orders him to take the assignment as his assistant. Stag reluctantly complies.

Stockton imposes military discipline on the civilian school. Two trainee mechanics are dismissed on the spot for being too slow. Stag warns his boss that he is pushing the men too hard, but Stockton disagrees. When Stockton inspects the newest batch of students, he is greatly displeased to find his own son, Ken (Chester Morris), among them. He would rather have him stay in the diplomatic service, but Ken wants to design aircraft.

Ken and Stag become rivals for the affections of Meg Lawrence (Joan Fontaine), the cousin of fellow school pilot and friend "Fergie" Ferguson (Paul Guilfoyle). Despite only seeing Meg a couple of times, Stag impulsively proposes to her, only to find she has already agreed to marry Ken.

Stag and Fergie are assigned a dangerous pioneering mapping flight from California to Alaska to Russia. Stockton pays them an awkward visit, observing that their aircraft could carry three. It is obvious that he wants his son to go along. Stag obliges.

Ken has a falling out with Meg over his flying, and she breaks off their engagement. When Stag finds out, he proposes again; she accepts after he agrees this will be his last flight. They get married in Yuma immediately, although there is no honeymoon as the mapping expedition departs within hours. The flight becomes uncomfortably awkward after Stag informs Ken about his marriage.

During the flight, the rudder becomes jammed, forcing an emergency landing in the Arctic wilderness to effect repairs. When they try to take off, the landing gear proves too weak, and the aircraft flips over. Ken and Stag are unharmed, but Fergie's legs are broken. They devise a travois to carry Fergie on the 300 mile trek to the coast. When it becomes apparent that they will not make it with the injured man as a burden, Fergie insists they leave him behind, but they refuse.

After Ken and Stag fall asleep, however, Fergie drags himself out of their tent to freeze to death. Eventually, Stag becomes too exhausted to go on. Ken is glad to leave him behind, but then recalls the time Stag stood up for him against his father after a near crash. He turns around, gets Stag to his feet and supports him as they trudge along. Shortly afterward, they stumble upon a settlement.

When they return to the school, Meg rushes into Ken's arms. Seeing how she feels, Stag tells her to get their marriage annulled.

== Cast ==
- Richard Dix as Captain W. R. "Stag" Cahill
- Chester Morris as Kenneth "Ken" Stockton
- Joan Fontaine as Meg Lawrence
- Harry Carey as Colonel Cornelius Stockton
- Paul Guilfoyle as "Fergie" Ferguson
- Robert Strange as Joe R. Weldon
- Vickie Lester as Edna (credited as Vicki Lester)
- James Bush as Cadet Thompson
- Eddie Marr as Cadet Austin (credited as Edward Marr)

== Production ==
Glendale's Grand Central Air Terminal was featured in Sky Giant, as well as in many other films of the era.

Under the working titles of Ground Crew and Northern Flight, principal photography took place in 1938, at the Grand Central Air Terminal at Glendale, California. At the time, media attention had been focused on the record-breaking circumnavigational flight of the globe in 1938 by Howard Hughes. RKO had considered incorporating newsreel footage of the flight by Hughes in the trailer for Sky Giant. B-movie specialist Lew Landers, was very familiar with aviation and would eventually helm nine aviation films including Without Orders (1936), Flight from Glory (1937), Air Hostess (1939) and Arctic Flight (1952).

=== Aircraft ===
In order of appearance:

- Opening scene, a Northrop Gamma 2D-2 (s/n 12, NC2111) (Note: Northrop Gamma (NC2111) was leased from businesswoman and aviator, Jacqueline Cochran.)
- American Airlines Douglas DST-217 "Flagship Washington" (s/n 1976, N18144)
- Ryan ST-A (NC16039)
- Fairchild 24C-8C (NC15346)
- Lockheed Model 12A Electra Junior (sc/n 1207, NC58Y)
- Lockheed Sirius 8A (s/n 151, NC117W)
- final scene (front view only), Stinson SR-9.

== Reception ==
=== Critical ===
Lionel Collier, writing for the British magazine, Picturegoer at the time of the film’s release, described it as "Another civil aviation drama which scores by its robust treatment and spectacular aerial thrills … There is a good deal of interest in the training of pilots and the dangers they have to face in the cause of research …The character drawing, too, is good in spite of the fact that the basic story is a rather extravagant triangle affair." He wrote favourably about the cast : "Richard Dix is in good form … Chester Morris is also effective and Joan Fontaine is charming as Meg. The old timer Harry Carey is apt to over act … but supporting players all present their chosen types."

More recently, Turner Classic Movies’ reviewer Rob Nixon noted that, "... producers at RKO put the aerial drama 'Sky Giant' (1938) into production and turned out a rather entertaining B-picture with some exciting action sequences."

Nicole Gagne of New York Times saw Sky Giant as a successful use of the aviation film genre. "Handsome aerial footage highlights this rousing RKO adventure tale that combines a frozen-North survival drama with a romantic-triangle love story." Aviation film historian James H. Farmer in Celluloid Wings: The Impact of Movies on Aviation (1984) considered, Sky Giant, "... a top-drawer RKO salute to commercial aviation."

=== Box office ===
Sky Giant was an unpretentious low-budget film, but, according to RKO records, the production made a profit of $165,000.
