= Night Waitress =

1936 film by Lew Landers

- Theatrical release poster
- Directed by: Lew Landers; Charles Kerr (assistant)
- Screenplay by: Marcus Goodrich
- Story by: Golda Draper
- Produced by: Joseph Henry Steele
- Starring: Margot Grahame; Gordon Jones; Vinton Hayworth; Marc Lawrence; Billy Gilbert
- Cinematography: Russell Metty
- Edited by: Desmond Marquette
- Music by: Roy Webb
- Production company: RKO Pictures
- Distributed by: RKO Pictures
- Release date: December 18, 1936
- Running time: 57 minutes
- Country: United States
- Language: English

Night Waitress is a 1936 American drama film directed by Lew Landers and written by Marcus Goodrich. The film stars Margot Grahame, Gordon Jones, Vinton Hayworth, Marc Lawrence and Billy Gilbert. The film was released on December 18, 1936, by RKO Pictures.

== Plot ==
A waterfront waitress and her boyfriend know too much about a murder and gold.

== Cast ==
- Margot Grahame as Helen Roberts
- Gordon Jones as Martin Rhodes
- Vinton Hayworth as George Skinner
- Marc Lawrence as Dorn
- Billy Gilbert as Torre
- Don 'Red' Barry as Mario Rigo
- Otto Yamaoka as Fong
- Paul Stanton as District Attorney
- Arthur Loft as Borgum
- Walter Miller as Police Inspector
- Anthony Quinn as gangster (uncredited)
- Willie Best as Cars For Rent attendant (uncredited)
