= Double Danger (1938 film) =

1938 film directed by Lew Landers

- Directed by: Lew Landers
- Screenplay by: Arthur T. Horman; J. Robert Bren
- Story by: Arthur T. Horman
- Produced by: Maury M. Cohen
- Starring: Preston Foster; Whitney Bourne
- Cinematography: Frank Redman
- Edited by: Desmond Marquette
- Production company: RKO Radio Pictures
- Distributed by: RKO Radio Pictures
- Release date: January 28, 1938 (US)
- Running time: 62 minutes
- Country: United States
- Language: English

Double Danger is a 1938 American crime drama directed by Lew Landers, using a screenplay by Arthur T. Horman and J. Robert Bren based on Horman's story. The film stars Preston Foster and Whitney Bourne, with supporting roles by Donald Meek and Samuel S. Hinds. Produced by RKO Radio Pictures, it was released on January 28, 1938.

== Plot ==
Robert Crane is a novelist who is writing a series of novels about "The Gentleman", a jewel thief. The novels are based on a real-life thief who goes by the same name. Crane's good friend, David Theron, is the police commissioner. Theron suspects two people of being The Gentlemen: his friend Crane, and Carolyn Morgan. Theron sets a trap by inviting them both to his house for the weekend, letting it be known that he will be keeping a set of famous jewels, the Konjer diamonds, in his safe. It is Theron's plan to have a duplicate set of false diamonds in their place.

The week prior to the event, Morgan and her accomplice, Taylor, steal the authentic Konjer diamonds from the jeweler, Gordon Ainsley. Learning about the theft, Crane and his partner, Fentriss, steal the stones from Morgan. Since both thieves have already accepted Theron's invitation, if they do not show up for the weekend, they will confirm his suspicions. Theron lets it be known that the diamonds stolen from Ainsley were fakes, and that he is in possession of the real Konjer collection. When the two teams of crooks arrive at Theron's house, Morgan falls for his deception, while Crane does not.

That night, she steals the fake diamonds. Crane, meanwhile, has fallen in love with her, and in order to protect her, he returns the originals to Theron. Theron suggests to Crane that the two leave the country, and that Crane write the final book in his "The Gentleman" series. Crane and Morgan take him up on his offer.

== Cast ==
- Preston Foster as Robert Crane aka "The Gentleman"
- Whitney Bourne as Carolyn Morgan
- Donald Meek as Gordon Ainsley
- Samuel S. Hinds as Commissioner David Theron
- Paul Guilfoyle as Taylor
- Cecil Kellaway as Fentriss
- June Johnson as Babs Theron
- Arthur Lake as Roy West
- Edythe Elliott as Edith Theron
- Alec Craig as Gardener
- Harry Hayden as Dr. Hilliard
- Vivian Oakland as Mrs. Cortlandt
- Richard Bond as Footman

(cast list as per AFI database)

== Production ==
The original title of this film was The Shadow Speaks, which led some media outlets to incorrectly link the picture with the popular magazine (and later radio) series featuring a character named, "The Shadow". That same year Grand National Films was beginning production on the second of their Shadow film series, starring Rod LaRocque, the working title of which was also The Shadow Speaks (although the final title was International Crime). Later that month, RKO announced that they were changing the title of their film to The Perfect Alibi. The movie went into production on December 2, 1937. By the end of the month the film was in the editing room. At the beginning of January 1938, the title of the picture was changed from The Perfect Alibi to Double Danger. The film was released on January 28, 1938. The National Legion of Decency gave the film an A-2 classification, calling it suitable for adult audiences. Maury Cohen, former founder and president of Invincible Films, had joined RKO in 1936 with great fanfare. This was his sixth and final film for his new studio.

== Reception ==
"A mild crook melodrama..." was how Harrison's Reports described the picture, saying it lacked excitement and suspense, and called the story "far-fetched." Photoplay was more kind to the film, finding it "fascinating", and they particularly enjoyed the performances of Preston Foster and Whitney Bourne. The Motion Picture Herald gave the film a good review, feeling the satirical edge to the piece gave an unusual and pleasing angle to a crime a drama. They applauded Lew Landers' restraint as a director, which kept the film's comedy from becoming too broad, and they also gave credit to the screenplay of Arthur Horman and J. Robert Bren, which they felt had a nice balance of suspense, humor, romance and satire. Motion Picture Daily also gave Double Danger a favorable review, enjoying its mixture of comedy, suspense, and romance. They highlighted Landers' direction, and complimented the acting corps, especially Cecil Kellaway and Samuel Hinds. While they found the storyline weak, The Film Daily thought the film was enjoyable, with good comedic and action sequences. They credited Landers with a good directorial stint, and singled out the performances of Foster, Bourne, Hinds as laudable, and also complimented the work of Paul Guilfoyle, Donald Meek, and Arthur Lake.
