= Enemy Agent =

1940 film

- Directed by: Lew Landers
- Written by: Edmund L. Hartmann; Sam Robins
- Produced by: Ben Pivar
- Starring: Richard Cromwell; Helen Vinson; Marjorie Reynolds
- Cinematography: Jerome Ash
- Edited by: Ted J. Kent
- Music by: Hans J. Salter
- Production company: Universal Pictures
- Distributed by: Universal Pictures
- Release date: April 19, 1940
- Running time: 64 minutes
- Country: United States
- Language: English

Enemy Agent is a 1940 American spy thriller film directed by Lew Landers and starring Richard Cromwell, Helen Vinson, and Robert Armstrong. The supporting cast includes Jack La Rue, Jack Carson, Philip Dorn and Milburn Stone. It was produced and distributed by Universal Studios

== Plot ==
A network of enemy agents infiltrate an aircraft factory to gain the plans on the United States' war preparations. A draughtsmen at the plant grows suspicious and so they attempt to frame him in the eyes of the FBI investators.

== Cast ==
- Richard Cromwell as Jimmy Saunders
- Helen Vinson as Irene Hunter
- Robert Armstrong as Gordon
- Marjorie Reynolds as Peggy O'Reilly
- Vinton Hayworth as Lester Taylor
- Russell Hicks as Lyman Scott
- Philip Dorn as Doctor Jeffry Arnold
- Jack La Rue as Alex
- Bradley Page as Francis
- Abner Biberman as Baronoff
- Luis Alberni as A. Calteroni
- Jack Carson as Ralph
- Milburn Stone as Meeker
- Henry Victor as Karl
- Steve Pendleton as Mickey
- Victor Potel as George
- Ernie Adams as Janitor
- Lloyd Ingraham as Barber
- Jean De Briac as Barber
- Brooks Benedict as Headwaiter
- Tom Steele as Police Car 57 Driver
- James Craig as Federal Agent

== Bibliography ==
- McLaughlin, Robert. We'll Always Have the Movies: American Cinema during World War II. University Press of Kentucky, 2006.
