= Behind the Headlines (1937 film) =

1937 American drama film directed by Richard Rosson

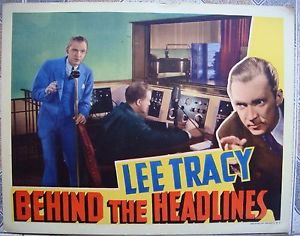
- Lobby card for the film
- Directed by: Richard Rosson
- Screenplay by: Edmund Hartmann; J. Robert Bren
- Story by: Thomas Ahearn
- Produced by: Cliff Reid
- Starring: Lee Tracy; Diana Gibson
- Cinematography: Russell Metty
- Edited by: Harry Marker
- Production company: RKO Radio Pictures
- Release date: May 14, 1937 (US)
- Running time: 60 minutes
- Country: United States
- Language: English

Behind the Headlines is a 1937 American crime action film directed by Richard Rosson from a screenplay by Edmund Hartmann and J. Robert Bren, based on an original story by Thomas Ahearn. It was produced and distributed by RKO Radio Pictures, which released the film on May 14, 1937. The film stars Lee Tracy and Diana Gibson, with a supporting cast that includes Donald Meek, Paul Guilfoyle, Philip Huston and Frank M. Thomas.

== Plot ==
Radio reporter Eddie Haines is known for his on-the-scene reporting. His associate Tiny relays Haines' reports to the station with a radio-equipped car. Haines was romantically involved with newspaper reporter Mary Bradley. Frustrated by Haines' ability to report stories before she can, Mary steals the radio and hides it in her car.

Haines leaves a hidden microphone in a room where gangster Art Martin and his crew are planning to rob a gold shipment to Fort Knox. Haines and Tiny overhear their plan, but an eavesdropping Mary does as well. Before she can phone the newspaper with the story, she encounters Potter, a federal officer whom she had previously met. Potter tells her that the authorities know the plot and that she must suppress the news. In return, he takes her to Louisville to follow the inside story. However, Potter is actually the mastermind of the plot and Mary becomes a captive of the gang. Haines and Tiny had tried to follow Martin from the meeting, but he evaded them.

The gang ambushes the armored truck carrying the gold and then drives to Potter's cave hideout. During the ambush, Mary secretly drops her inscribed watch, a gift from Haines, by the roadside. Mary's editor thinks that Haines has kidnapped her. Haines sees a report about the watch found at the crime scene and assists the authorities in Kentucky.

In the cave, Mary is able to broadcast a call for help from her car using the stolen radio. Haines hears her transmission while in a bar. When Mary calls again, federal agents locate her position by direction finding. Federal agents and state police surround the area while Tiny flies overhead in a blimp, listening for more calls from Mary. She issues another call, and Tiny hears and traces it. Potter spots the radio, but Mary grabs it and locks herself in the armored truck, still broadcasting, and Tiny is able to pinpoint her location. The gang tries to open the truck with a torch, but the authorities arrive in time to save Mary. Haines embraces Mary and allows her to tell her story on the air, but she tells the audience to read about it in her newspaper.

== Cast ==
(Cast list as per AFI film database)

- Lee Tracy as Eddie Haines
- Diana Gibson as Mary Bradley
- Donald Meek as Potter
- Paul Guilfoyle as Art Martin
- Philip Huston as Bennett
- Frank M. Thomas as Naylor
- Tom Kennedy as Tiny
- Doodles Weaver as Duggan
- Ralph Robertson as Announcer
- Art Thalasso as Bartender
- Edith Craig as Bennett's secretary

== Reception ==
Critic Mae Tinée of the Chicago Tribune wrote: "'Behind the Headlines' has considerable in the way of story originality, and there are stretches when it is pretty fast and exciting. But there are more stretches where mediocre direction, and the self-consciousness of the leading lady give the piece an amateurish tinge. ... The film has some suspense, and considerable that may pass for comedy."

Bosley Crowther of The New York Times noted similarities between Lee Tracy's character and that which he portrayed in I'll Tell the World (1934) and wrote that the plot "carefully observes all the accepted disunities of time, space and super-action."

Reviewer John L. Scott of the Los Angeles Times remarked that although Behind the Headlines was shorter than average features, it offered suspense and novelty.

Other reviews found the plot to be implausible, but some found the film exciting and praised Tracy's performance.
