= Crashing Hollywood (1938 film) =

1938 film by Lew Landers

- Theatrical release poster
- Directed by: Lew Landers
- Screenplay by: Paul Yawitz; Gladys Atwater
- Based on: Lights Out; 1922 play by Paul Dickey; Mann Page
- Produced by: Cliff Reid
- Starring: Lee Tracy; Joan Woodbury; Paul Guilfoyle; Lee Patrick; Bradley Page
- Cinematography: Nicholas Musuraca; Frank Redman
- Edited by: Harry Marker
- Music by: Alberto Colombo; Max Steiner; Roy Webb
- Production company: RKO Pictures
- Distributed by: RKO Pictures
- Release date: January 7, 1938
- Running time: 61 minutes
- Country: United States
- Language: English

Crashing Hollywood is a 1938 American comedy film directed by Lew Landers and written by Paul Yawitz and Gladys Atwater. The film stars Lee Tracy, Joan Woodbury, Paul Guilfoyle, Lee Patrick and Bradley Page. The film was released on January 7, 1938, by RKO Pictures. It is based on the 1922 play of the same title by Paul Dickey and Mann Page, previous adapted into the 1923 silent film Lights Out.

== Plot ==
A screenwriter meets a man recently out of jail and his wife on a train; they decide to collaborate and write a film, but trouble appears when a gangster is outraged by his depiction in the film.

== Cast ==
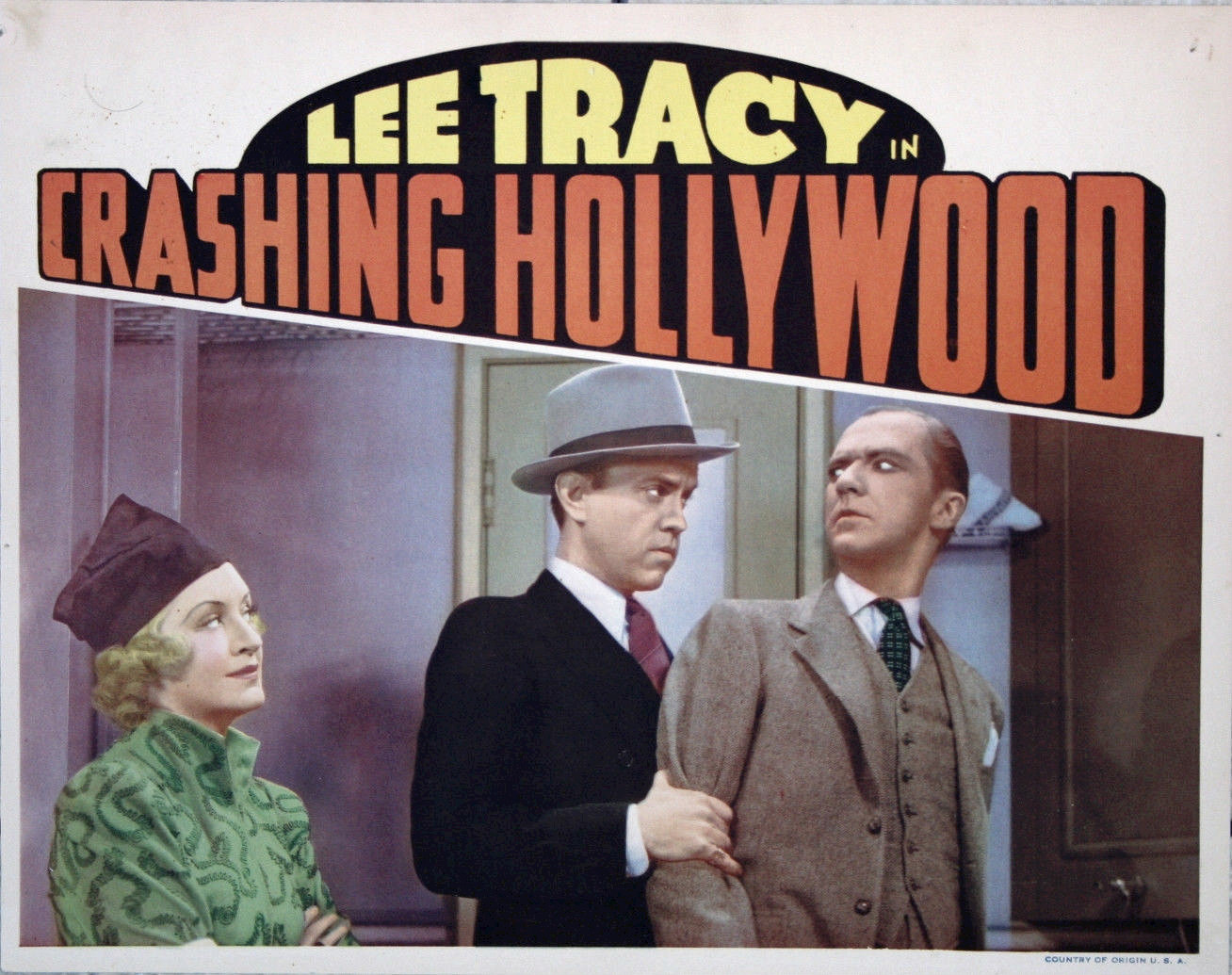
Lobby card

- Lee Tracy as Michael Winslow
- Joan Woodbury as Barbara Lang
- Paul Guilfoyle as Herman Tibbets
- Lee Patrick as Goldie Tibbets
- Bradley Page as Thomas 'Tom' Darcy / 'The Hawk'
- Richard Lane as Hugo Wells
- Tom Kennedy as Al
- George Irving as Alexander Peyton
- Frank M. Thomas as Detective Decker
- Jack Carson as Dickson
- Alec Craig as Movie Studio Receptionist
- Jimmy Conlin as Crisby
- Willie Best as Train Porter (uncredited)
