= China Passage =

1937 American mystery film directed by Edward Killy

- Theatrical poster of film
- Directed by: Edward Killy
- Screenplay by: Edmund L. Hartmann; J. Robert Bren
- Story by: Taylor Caven
- Produced by: Samuel J. Briskin; Cliff Reid
- Starring: Constance Worth; Vinton Haworth; Leslie Fenton; Gordon Jones
- Cinematography: Nicholas Musuraca
- Edited by: Desmond Marquette
- Music by: Max Steiner
- Production company: RKO Radio Pictures
- Distributed by: RKO Radio Pictures
- Release date: March 12, 1937 (US)
- Running time: 65 minutes
- Country: United States
- Language: English

China Passage is a 1937 American mystery film directed by Edward Killy from a screenplay by Edmund L. Hartmann and J. Robert Bren, based on a story by Taylor Caven. RKO Radio Pictures produced the film, which stars Constance Worth, Vinton Haworth, Leslie Fenton and Gordon Jones. Haworth was injured in an automobile accident in January 1937, delaying the film's released until March 12, 1937.

== Plot ==
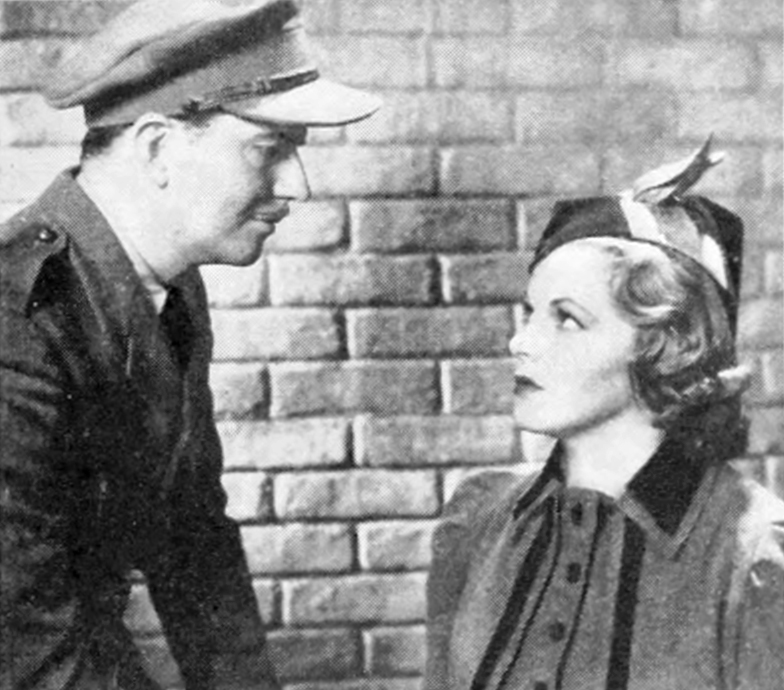
Constance Worth and Vinton Hayworth in China Passage

Tom Baldwin and Joe Dugan are two American adventurers who are hired to escort the wife of a Chinese general to Shanghai. She is carrying a priceless diamond. Upon their arrival at the destination, there is a firefight, during which the diamond is stolen. The two Americans round up a group of suspects, but have no luck uncovering the stolen jewel. Among the suspects are Jane Dunn and Katherine Collins, an author named Anthony Durand and Harvey Dinwiddle. They release the suspects and then make plans to travel to San Francisco. When they board the ship, they are surprised to find that all of the suspects are also aboard the same boat. Baldwin and Dugan resume their search for the diamond and soon discover that Jane is actually an American customs agent who is also trying to find the jewel. As their search continues, Baldwin and Jane fall in love. After their room is tossed, Dugan is killed. Katherine is an insurance investigator who has uncovered some information, but she is killed before she can pass that information on to Jane and Baldwin. Baldwin is framed for Katherine's murder, but Jane solves the diamond's theft and the murders, revealing that Durand and his henchman Dinwiddle are the perpetrators.

Baldwin and Jane are married by the ship's captain.

== Cast ==
- Constance Worth as Jane Dunn
- Vinton Haworth as Tom Baldwin
- Leslie Fenton as Anthony Durand
- Gordon Jones as Joe Dugan
- Alec Craig as Harvey Dinwiddle
- Dick Elliott as Philip Burton
- Frank M. Thomas as Captain Williams
- George Irving as Dr. Sibley
- Billy Gilbert as Bartender
- Joyce Compton as Mrs. Katharine Collins
- Philip Ahn as Dr. Feng Tu
- Lotus Long as Lia Sen
- Huntley Gordon as Arthur Trent
- Edgar Dearing as Bill
- Lotus Liu as Yo Ling
- Tetsu Komai as Wong
- Moy Ming as Chang
- William Corson as Officer
- Alan Curtis as Officer

== Production ==
RKO obtained the rights to Taylor Craven's original story, Miss Customs Agent, in July 1936, and its title was also the film's working title. Edward Killy was assigned to direct the film in mid-October, and filming was slated to begin in mid-November. In the first week of December, it was announced that seven performers had been assigned to the project: Vinton Hayworth, Constance Worth (in her American screen debut), Frank Thomas, Walter Coy, Diana Gibson, Gordon Jones and George Irving. Dick Elliot joined the cast in mid-December, and production began shortly before Christmas. In late December, Joyce Compton joined the cast, and shortly thereafter, the film's title was changed to China Passage. Production was delayed for two weeks at the beginning of 1937 when Vincent Haworth was injured in a car accident on New Year's Day. He was released to return to work on January 12. The film was finished by the end of January 1937, and the editing process began in the first week of February. The film opened on March 12, 1937. After the film premiered, the National Legion of Decency assigned the film an A-1 rating, classifying it as unobjectionable for general audiences.

== Reception ==
The Film Daily fair review called the story "stilted, unoriginal and implausible" and praised only the film's technical aspects of the film. Harrison's Reports also published a negative review, calling the plot "far-fetched and meaningless" and the comedic portions "tired." However, the review reported that Constance Worth's her acting was "pleasant," as were the romantic interludes between Worth and Vinton Hayworth. Motion Picture Daily was more positive, writing that the film was "unpretentious" and "moderately entertaining," with Worth "capable" and "attractive" and Leslie Fenton's sinister performance laudable. Motion Picture Magazine awarded the film two and a half stars (out of four) and complimented the plot and locales while stating that the acting was adequate.
