= Davy Crockett, Indian Scout =

1950 film by Lew Landers

- Film poster
- Directed by: Lew Landers
- Screenplay by: Richard Schayer
- Story by: Ford Beebe
- Produced by: Grant Whytock; Bernard Small
- Starring: George Montgomery; Ellen Drew
- Cinematography: George E. Diskant (as George Diskant); John J. Mescall (as John Mescall)
- Edited by: Stewart S. Frye (as Stewart Frye); Kenneth G. Crane (as Kenneth Crane)
- Music by: Paul Sawtell
- Production company: Edward Small Productions
- Distributed by: United Artists
- Release dates: January 1950; March 16, 1950 (New York)
- Running time: 71 minutes
- Country: United States
- Language: English
- Budget: $400,000 (est.)

Davy Crockett, Indian Scout is a 1950 American Western film directed by Lew Landers and starring George Montgomery and Ellen Drew. Wartime hero Johnny McKee has a small role in the film, as does Jim Thorpe.

== Plot ==
During the 1840s, a wagon train is headed west with Davy Crockett, a young man who shares a name with his famous frontiersman uncle, acting as one of the train's native scouts. After the passengers narrowly survive a series of Indian ambushes, they come to believe that a spy is on board who is helping to plot the attacks. Suspicions fall on Davy's innocent partner Red Hawk, so he and Davy attempt to find the real culprit.

== Cast ==
- George Montgomery as Davy Crockett
- Ellen Drew as Frances Oatman
- Phillip Reed as Red Hawk
- Noah Beery Jr. as Tex McGee
- Paul Guilfoyle as Ben
- Addison Richards as Capt. Weightman
- Robert Barrat as James Lone Eagle
- Erik Rolf as Mr. Simms
- William Wilkerson as High Tree
- John Hamilton as Col. Willard
- Vera Marshe as Mrs. Simms
- Jimmy Moss as Jimmy Simms
- Chief Thundercloud as Sleeping Fox
- Kenne Duncan as Sgt. Gordon (as Kenneth Duncan)
- Ray Teal as Capt. McHale
- Iron Eyes Cody as Brave (uncredited)

== Production ==
The film's title was lengthened from Indian Scout just prior to its release.

Much of the footage was taken from the 1940 film Kit Carson, starring Jon Hall, Dana Andrews and Clayton Moore.

== Reception ==
In a contemporary review for The New York Times, critic A. H. Weiler wrote: "There's nary a cowboy in sight and its hero is not the Davy Crockett of Alamo fame. He's only the famous frontiersman's cousin. But he's no tenderfoot either. A tough hombre, he not only geta the wagon train safely through the hostile territory but also saves the cavalry from a Redskin ambush. And, as played by George Montgomery. he's a gent who recognizes that there are good and bad Indians and even saves bis sidekick, Red Hawk, and Frances, that brave's girl friend, from the Army's wrath .. In between there's lots of fireworks and little logic. 'Davy Crockett, Indian Scout' should warm the cockles of the hearts of the 10-year-olds."
