= Tarnished Angel =

1938 American film directed by Leslie Goodwins

- Directed by: Leslie Goodwins; James Anderson (assistant)
- Screenplay by: Jo Pagano
- Story by: Saul Elkins
- Produced by: B. P. Fineman
- Starring: Sally Eilers; Lee Bowman; Ann Miller; Alma Kruger
- Cinematography: Nicholas Musuraca
- Edited by: Desmond Marquette
- Music by: Frank Tours
- Production company: RKO Radio Pictures
- Release date: October 28, 1938 (US)
- Running time: 68 minutes
- Country: United States
- Language: English

Tarnished Angel is a 1938 American drama film directed by Leslie Goodwins from a screenplay by Jo Pagano, based on a story by Saul Elkins. Starring Sally Eilers, Lee Bowman, Ann Miller, and Alma Kruger, the film was produced and distributed by RKO Radio Pictures and released on October 28, 1938.

== Cast ==
- Sally Eilers as Carol Vinson
- Lee Bowman as Paul Montgomery
- Ann Miller as Violet 'Vi' McMaster
- Alma Kruger as Mrs. Harry Stockton
- Paul Guilfoyle as Edward 'Eddie' Fox
- Jonathan Hale as Detective Sgt. Edward Cramer
- Vinton Hayworth as Dan 'Dandy' Bennett
- Cecil Kellaway as Reginald 'Reggie' Roland
