= Blind Alibi =

1938 film by Lew Landers

- Theatrical release poster
- Directed by: Lew Landers
- Screenplay by: Lionel Houser; Harry Segall; Ron Ferguson
- Story by: William J. Cowen
- Produced by: Cliff Reid
- Starring: Richard Dix; Whitney Bourne; Eduardo Ciannelli; Frances Mercer; Paul Guilfoyle
- Cinematography: Nicholas Musuraca
- Edited by: Ted Cheesman
- Music by: Bernhard Kaun; Nathaniel Shilkret; Max Steiner; Roy Webb
- Production company: RKO Pictures
- Distributed by: RKO Pictures
- Release date: May 20, 1938
- Running time: 61 minutes
- Country: United States
- Language: English

Blind Alibi is a 1938 American drama film directed by Lew Landers and written by Lionel Houser, Harry Segall and Ron Ferguson. The film stars Richard Dix, Whitney Bourne, Eduardo Ciannelli, Frances Mercer and Paul Guilfoyle. The film was released on May 20, 1938, by RKO Pictures.

== Plot ==
Sculptor Paul Dover is trying to help his sister who is being blackmailed with some love letters she wrote in her youth by an ex-fiancé of hers.

== Cast ==
- Richard Dix as Paul Dover
- Whitney Bourne as Julia Fraser
- Eduardo Ciannelli as Mitch
- Frances Mercer as Ellen
- Paul Guilfoyle as Taggart
- Richard Lane as Bowers
- Vinton Hayworth as Dirk
- Walter Miller as Maitland
- Frank M. Thomas as Larson
- Solly Ward as Al
- George Irving as Curator
- Ace the Wonder Dog as Ace
