= Paul Trauger Culbertson Sr. =

Former U.S. diplomat

Honorable Paul Trauger Culbertson Sr.

United States Ambassador to Spain
- In office June 1947 – December 1950
- President: Harry S. Truman
- Preceded by: Philip W. Bonsal
- Succeeded by: Stanton Griffis

Personal details
- Born: Paul Trauger Culbertson; April 11, 1897 Greensburg, Pennsylvania, US
- Died: December 18, 1968 (aged 71)
- Resting place: Darnestown, Maryland, US
- Spouse: Maria Bisset Culbertson
- Relations: William S. Culbertson (brother)
- Children: Paul Trauger Culbertson Jr.
- Education: Yale University
- Awards: Croix de Guerre

Military service
- Allegiance: United States
- Branch/service: United States Army Ambulance Service
- Rank: Private
- Battles/wars: World War I: Second Battle of the Somme

Paul Trauger Culbertson Sr. (April 11, 1897 – December 18, 1968) was an American diplomat and soldier.

== Biography ==
=== Early life ===
Culbertson was born on April 11, 1897, in Greensburg, Pennsylvania, to George Culbertson, alongside three other sons. He studied at Western High School, before enlisting as a private on November 1, 1917, during World War I in the United States Army Ambulance Service, where he participated in the Second Battle of the Somme, during which he was awarded the Croix de Guerre. Following two of his brothers into the university, Culbertson graduated from Yale University in 1923; while there he joined Alpha Chi Rho and the Yale Glee Club. After graduating he moved to Emporia, Kansas.

Culbertson had a son, Paul Trauger Culbertson Jr., with his wife Maria Bisset Culbertson, on February 2, 1929. Shortly after, in the 1930s, the family moved to Darnestown, Maryland.

=== Diplomatic career ===
Culbertson was nominated to serve as a Consul for the United States in 1932. He then went on to serve as Assistant Chief of the Office of Western European Affairs. While serving in this role he at times worked alongside his brother, William Smith Culbertson, who had already served as an Ambassador to Chile and continued to represent the United States abroad. He also worked to ensure U.S. access to military bases and airfields in the French controlled territories of Northern and Western Africa.

Culbertson began serving as Chargé d’Affaires of the United States to Spain in June 1947. During his tenure, he faced the challenge of negotiating with Francisco Franco's government in the aftermath of World War II. Despite pressure from European allies and Spanish exiles who had stood against the fascist powers during WWII, he was instructed that the U.S. would not be seeking to remove Franco from power beginning in 1948. This change in policy, along with 'friendly' relations by certain members of congress, made it difficult to achieve concessions from Spain in negotiations; this resulted in negotiations between the two countries seeing much debate over numerous issues.

Early on one such issue was the battle between extradition and repatriation of German Nazis in the aftermath of the war. Despite domestic pressure, Culbertson did not see the affair as integral to security, instead believing the people remaining within West Germany were a larger security threat. Another was negotiating with Franco's regime over the allocation of foreign aid, the government did not want to be included under the Marshal Plan and would push back against Culbertson's attempts to liberalize the economy of the country and expand personal liberties. One of the liberties that he criticized Franco over was the lack of religious liberty within the state. He would occasionally join, then Spanish Foreign Minister, Alberto Martín-Artajo for hunting trips.

By June 1949 Culbertson's tone shifted. He began writing back to the United States that he was skeptical of the need to export democratic values to other countries and that the Spanish people were culturally incompatible with democratic beliefs. This change also became evident in his opinion on the U.S. tolerating the Franco regime, as he stated that, in his opinion, economic sanctions would be foolish and that after the fall of Franco "all hell would break loose" in Spain. He left this position in December 1950.

Culbertson died on December 18, 1968.
