= You Can't Beat Love =

1937 film by Christy Cabanne

- Theatrical release poster
- Directed by: Christy Cabanne
- Screenplay by: Maxwell Shane; David Silverstein
- Based on: Quintuplets to You; 1936 story by Olga Moore
- Produced by: Robert Sisk
- Starring: Preston Foster; Joan Fontaine; Herbert Mundin; William Brisbane; Alan Bruce
- Cinematography: Russell Metty
- Edited by: Ted Cheesman
- Music by: Max Steiner; Roy Webb
- Production company: RKO Pictures
- Distributed by: RKO Pictures
- Release date: June 25, 1937
- Running time: 62 minutes
- Country: United States
- Language: English

You Can't Beat Love is a 1937 American comedy film directed by Christy Cabanne and written by Maxwell Shane and David Silverstein. The film stars Preston Foster, Joan Fontaine, Herbert Mundin, William Brisbane and Alan Bruce. The film was released on June 25, 1937.

== Plot ==
Jimmy Hughes (Preston Foster) is a fun-loving carouser who can't resist a dare. He is awakened by his gentleman's gentleman Jasper (Herbert Mundin) after a drunken evening in which he misappropriated a milk truck, and instructs Jasper to see that the damages (thirty dollars' worth of lost milk) are paid and the truck is returned. Accompanied by Jasper, Jimmy then fulfills a bet by putting in a day of hard work digging ditches in formal wear, good-naturedly tangling with other crew members in the process. He donates his winnings to a children's charity.

When a campaign truck stops by the site to dispense free cake and solicit support for Mayor Olson's re-election, Jimmy engages in a heckling match with a campaign worker who proves to be the mayor's daughter, Trudy Olson (Joan Fontaine). Trudy angrily suggests that he throw his hat in the ring, and in a bluff, he declares that he will.

When the newspapers run with the story, Jimmy is caught by surprise and the mayor's campaign is concerned. Trudy visits Jimmy at his home with a cake to patch things up, and as he pledges to clear up the misunderstanding, the two become mutually attracted. Trudy accompanies Jimmy to the newspaper office the next day to help him announce his withdrawal, but she mistakenly dares him to run for real, obliging him to do so.

Jimmy pledges a clean campaign, but still ruffles Trudy at times as he continues to pursue her. Things begin to go well between them again as Jimmy helps Trudy save a child who has stolen ice from an ice truck from punishment, and they steal a fun ride on the back of the truck together.

The corrupt police chief, who works for the mayor, secretly attempts to frame Jimmy by luring him to a phony love nest with a hired woman (Barbara Pepper) and a waiting photographer, but catches Jimmy's friend instead. In retaliation, Jimmy recruits the woman's jealous boyfriend, a gangster, to involve the police chief in a citywide gambling ring.

As the mayor comes under criticism for the resulting scandal, Trudy visits Jimmy's campaign office and overhears him colluding with the gamblers. At a debate on election eve, she accuses him of being behind the ring. Jimmy produces a check designating all gambling proceeds to a children's charity, and plays a recording for the crowd of the police chief agreeing to participate in the criminal profits. He also has a recording of the mayor angrily confronting the police chief, proving the mayor's innocence. Jimmy then endorses the mayor for re-election as the guilty parties are arrested. The press asks for a photo of Jimmy kissing Trudy, and she dares him.

== Cast ==
- Preston Foster as James Ellsworth 'Jimmy' Hughes
- Joan Fontaine as Trudy Olson
- Herbert Mundin as Jasper 'Meadows' Hives
- William Brisbane as Clem Bruner
- Alan Bruce as Scoop Gallagher
- Paul Hurst as Foreman Butch Mehaffey
- Bradley Page as Dwight Parsons
- Berton Churchill as Police Chief Brennan
- Frank M. Thomas as Mayor Olson
- Harold Huber as Pretty Boy Jones
- Paul Guilfoyle as Louie the Weasel
- Barbara Pepper as May 'Bubbles' Smith
