= Sunset on the Desert =

1942 film by Joseph Kane

- Theatrical release poster
- Directed by: Joseph Kane
- Screenplay by: Gerald Geraghty
- Produced by: Joseph Kane
- Starring: Roy Rogers; George "Gabby" Hayes
- Cinematography: Reggie Lanning
- Edited by: Lester Orlebeck
- Production company: Republic Pictures
- Distributed by: Republic Pictures
- Release date: April 1, 1942 (United States)
- Running time: 63 minutes; 54 minutes
- Country: United States
- Language: English

Sunset on the Desert is a 1942 American Western film directed by Joseph Kane and starring Roy Rogers, and George "Gabby" Hayes.

== Cast ==
- Roy Rogers as Roy Rogers / Deputy Bill Sloan
- George "Gabby" Hayes as Gabby Whittaker
- Lynne Carver as Ann Kirby
- Frank M. Thomas as Judge Alvin Kirby
- Beryl Wallace as Julie Craig
- Glenn Strange as Deputy Louie Meade
- Douglas Fowley as Ramsay McCall
- Fred Burns as Jim Prentiss
- Roy Barcroft as Henchman Deputy
- Henry Wills as Deputy Ed
- Forrest Taylor as George Belknap
- Sons of the Pioneers as Musicians

== Soundtrack ==
- Sons of the Pioneers - "It's a Lie" (Written by Bob Nolan)
- Roy Rogers - "Remember Me" (Written by Bob Nolan)
- Roy Rogers and the Sons of the Pioneers - "Faithful Pal O' Mine" (Written by Tim Spencer)
- "Don Juan" (Written by Tim Spencer and Glenn Spencer)
- "Yippi-Yi Your Troubles Away" Written by Tim Spencer and Glenn Spencer
