= Fixer Dugan =

1939 film by Lew Landers

- Directed by: Lew Landers; James Anderson (assistant)
- Screenplay by: Bert Granet; Paul Yawitz
- Based on: What's a Fixer For? 1928 play by H. C. Potter
- Produced by: Cliff Reid
- Starring: Lee Tracy; Virginia Weidler; Peggy Shannon
- Cinematography: J. Roy Hunt
- Edited by: Henry Berman
- Music by: Roy Webb
- Production company: RKO Radio Pictures
- Distributed by: RKO Radio Pictures
- Release date: April 21, 1939
- Running time: 68 minutes
- Country: United States
- Language: English

Fixer Dugan is a 1939 American drama film starring Lee Tracy as a circus promoter who decides to help out an orphaned girl, played by Virginia Weidler. The film was directed by Lew Landers, released by RKO Radio Pictures and is based on the play What's a Fixer For? by H.C. Potter.

== Plot ==
Charlie Dugan is the "fixer" who keeps Barvin's Greater Shows, a struggling traveling circus, going. He is glad to welcome back lion tamer Aggie Moreno, as her act is a popular one. However, she and top-billed high wire artist Pat O'Connell loathe each other, and that's a feud that Aggie extends to include Pat's 10-year-old daughter Terry. However, when Pat falls to her death during a performance, Dugan persuades Aggie to take charge of the orphan girl. After a while, Aggie finds she likes Terry.

One night, Terry overhears Frank Darlow (the son of a rival circus owner) and Jake talking about how to take possession of Aggie's lions. Darlow's father had tricked Aggie into signing a bill of sale for them. When Terry is unable to interrupt Aggie's performance to warn her, she sneaks through the lions' entrance into the cage. This disturbs the lions, and Aggie is barely able to control them and get Terry out of danger. The audience, thinking this is all part of the act, is thrilled. Dugan asks Darlow to meet him in a few hours to pick up the lions, but when Darlow shows up, the circus has already left. Darlow and Jake give chase.

Dugan keeps Terry in the lion taming act, which becomes so popular that A. J. Barvin tells her that she has saved his circus. Dugan keeps outsmarting Darlow, but finally Darlow brings the local sheriff to take custody of Terry; Dugan does not have a permit for the underage girl to be working. Terry is put in a children's home run by Mrs. Fletcher.

Having been rained out at the next scheduled location, Dugan persuades Barvin to put on a performance at the children's home instead. Mrs. Fletcher tells Aggie that any attempt to adopt Terry would be rejected. Terry stows away on one of the trucks when the circus leaves.

Darlow shows up with a policeman, but Dugan dupes him into signing a bill of sale, returning the lions to Aggie. Meanwhile, Aggie's assistant, thinking the lions are going to be taken away, lets one of them out before anybody can stop him. The lion stalks Terry, but Aggie manages to hold it off until it is netted. Mrs. Fletcher witnesses this and tells Aggie that she has changed her mind and would approve an adoption.

== Cast ==
- Lee Tracy as Charlie "Fixer" Dugan
- Virginia Weidler as Ethel Myrtle "Terry" O'Connell
- Peggy Shannon as Aggie Moreno
- Bradley Page as A. J. Barvin
- William Edmunds as Smiley
- Edward Gargan as Jake
- Vinton Hayworth as Frank Darlow (credited as Jack Arnold)
- Rita La Roy as Patricia "Pat" O'Connell
- Irene Franklin as Jane
- John Dilson as Steve
- Edythe Elliott as Mrs. Fletcher
