= Frank M. Thomas =

American actor

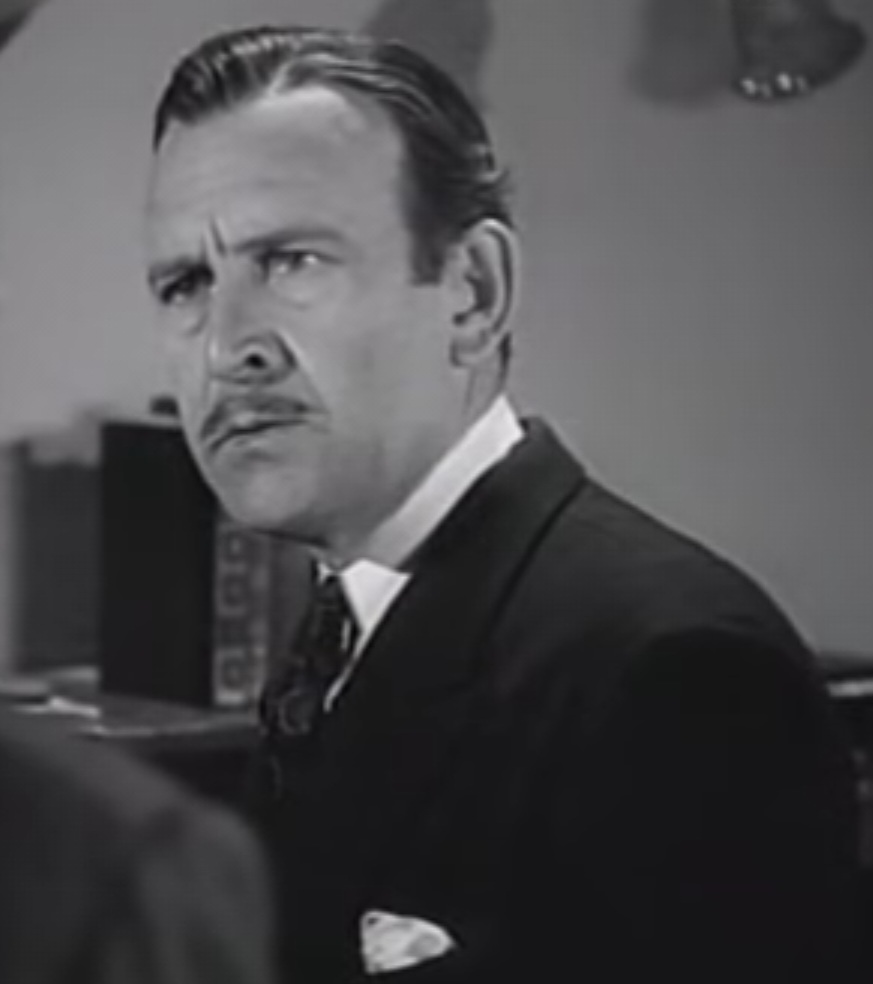
- Thomas in Sunset on the Desert (1942)
- Born: Frank Marion Thomas; July 13, 1889
- Died: November 25, 1989 (aged 100)
- Resting place: Forest Lawn Memorial Park, Hollywood Hills, California
- Occupation: Actor
- Years active: 1914–1965
- Spouse: Mona Bruns
- Children: Frank Marion Thomas Jr.

Frank Marion Thomas (July 13, 1889 – November 25, 1989) was an American character actor of stage, screen and television.

== Biography ==
Thomas's parents were Jesse and Virginia Thomas. He first appeared on Broadway in 1914. Thomas also played many supporting roles in films from the 1930s through the 1970s. In 1937 alone, he appeared in 21 films. His best-known films were We Who Are About To Die (1937), A Man to Remember (1938), A Shot In the Dark (1941), Desert Trail (1942), and No Place for a Lady (1943). His last screen appearance was in The Killing of a Chinese Bookie (1976).

He performed on television from the 1950s to the 1970s. He was president (Shepherd) of The Lambs (1962–63).

He and his wife, actress Mona Bruns, were the parents of actor Frankie Thomas. He died in 1989 at the age of 100, and is interred next to his wife, who also died at 100, at Forest Lawn Memorial Park, Hollywood, California.

== Filmography ==
(Per AFI database)

- Nearly Married (1917) as Harry Lindsey
- Deadline at Eleven (1920) as Jack Rawson
- Wednesday's Child (1934) as Attorney for the Defense (as Frank Thomas Sr.)
- M'liss (1936)
- The Big Game (1936)
- The Ex-Mrs. Bradford (1936)
- Don't Turn 'Em Loose (1936)
- Mummy's Boys (1936)
- Grand Jury (1936)
- The Last Outlaw (1936)
- Without Orders (1936)
- Wanted! Jane Turner (1936)
- Behind the Headlines (1937)
- Breakfast for Two (1937)
- The Toast of New York (1937)
- Forty Naughty Girls (1937)
- Danger Patrol (1937)
- We're on the Jury (1937)
- The Man Who Found Himself (1937)
- Don't Tell the Wife (1937)
- We Who Are About to Die (1937)
- Criminal Lawyer (1937)
- Quick Money (1937)
- Racing Lady (1937)
- The Outcasts of Poker Flat (1937)
- You Can't Buy Luck (1937)
- They Wanted to Marry (1937)
- The Soldier and the Lady (1937)
- You Can't Beat Love (1937)
- High Flyers (1937)
- Meet the Missus (1937)
- The Big Shot (1937)
- China Passage (1937)
- The Renegade Ranger (1938)
- Maid's Night Out (1938)
- Night Spot (1938)
- Joy of Living (1938)
- Crashing Hollywood (1938)
- Vivacious Lady (1938)
- Blind Alibi (1938)
- Go Chase Yourself (1938)
- Everybody's Doing It (1938)
- Crime Ring (1938)
- Mr. Doodle Kicks Off (1938)
- Law of the Underworld (1938)
- The Saint in New York (1938)
- Smashing the Rackets (1938)
- This Marriage Business (1938)
- Bringing Up Baby (1938)
- A Man to Remember (1938)
- Strange Faces (1938)
- Disbarred (1939)
- The Rookie Cop (1939)
- They Made Her a Spy (1939)
- Saga of Death Valley (1939)
- Death of a Champion (1939)
- Society Lawyer (1939)
- Bachelor Mother (1939)
- They All Come Out (1939)
- Secret Service of the Air (1939)
- Scandal Sheet (1939)
- Mr. Smith Goes to Washington (1939) as Hendricks (uncredited)
- The Mysterious Miss X (1939)
- Grand Jury Secrets (1939)
- $1,000 a Touchdown (1939)
- Burn 'Em Up O'Connor (1939)
- Beware Spooks! (1939)
- Geronimo (1939)
- Lillian Russell (1940)
- Brigham Young - Frontiersman (1940)
- Chad Hanna (1940)
- Maryland (1940)
- Women Without Names (1940)
- High School (1940)
- The Man from Dakota (1940)
- City of Chance (1940)
- Shooting High (1940)
- Queen of the Mob (1940)
- Among the Living (1941)
- Arkansas Judge (1941)
- Dangerously They Live (1941)
- Life with Henry (1941)
- Man at Large (1941)
- The Monster and the Girl (1941)
- A Shot in the Dark (1941)
- Sierra Sue (1941)
- Three Sons o' Guns (1941)
- Wyoming Wildcat (1941)
- Apache Trail (1942)
- A Desperate Chance for Ellery Queen (1942)
- Eyes in the Night (1942)
- Flight Lieutenant (1942)
- The Great Man's Lady (1942)
- Henry Aldrich, Editor (1942)
- Obliging Young Lady (1942)
- The Postman Didn't Ring (1942)
- Reap the Wild Wind (1942)
- Sunset on the Desert (1942)
- Sunset Serenade (1942)
- The Talk of the Town (1942)
- Wild Bill Hickok Rides (1942)
- Flight for Freedom (1943)
- Hello Frisco, Hello (1943)
- Mountain Rhythm (1943)
- No Place for a Lady (1943)
- The Desert Song (1944)
- The Story of Kenneth W. Randall, M.D. (1946)
- The Sleeping City (1950)
