= You Can't Buy Luck =

1937 film by Lew Landers

- Directed by: Lew Landers
- Screenplay by: Arthur T. Horman; Martin Mooney
- Produced by: Maury M. Cohen
- Starring: Onslow Stevens; Helen Mack; Vinton Hayworth
- Cinematography: J. Roy Hunt
- Edited by: Jack Hively
- Music by: Roy Webb
- Production company: RKO Pictures
- Distributed by: RKO Pictures
- Release date: April 30, 1937
- Running time: 61 minutes
- Country: United States
- Language: English
- Budget: $86,000
- Box office: $175,000

You Can't Buy Luck is a 1937 American murder mystery film directed by Lew Landers and starring Onslow Stevens, Helen Mack and Vinton Hayworth. It was produced and distributed by Hollywood studio RKO Pictures.

== Plot ==
Superstitious New York gambler Joe Baldwin (Onslow Stevens), owner of the thoroughbred racing horse Sarcasm, believes that luck can be bought with charitable deeds. Before the Kentucky Derby, to "buy luck," he finances an expensive trip to Europe for gold-digger Jean Jason, his "good luck charm," not knowing she is taking her lover with her, gigolo and sometime artist Paul Vinette (Vinton Hayworth). He also gives his old friend Frank Brent cash to save his cab business and visits an orphanage in Louisville with his sister, where he meets Betty McKay (Helen Mack), a pretty teacher who scoffs at his philosophy.

She scolds him for wishing for rain on the day of the Derby to aid his horse, who runs best on a muddy track, because the orphans plan an outdoor party. Although it rains as wished, Sarcasm loses the Derby, and Joe is convinced that it was because the orphans were pulling against him. In an attempt to repair the damage before the Preakness, Joe throws the orphans a lavish party, hiring clowns and other entertainment. To Betty's surprise, Joe is as excited as the children, and they fall in love.

After Sarcasm wins the Preakness, Joe returns to New York, where Jean is back from Europe. Joe tells her that he will not be seeing her any more because he is going to marry Betty, and she cajoles $50,000 from him as a final "luck insurance" payment. Before Joe shows up with the check, however, Paul arrives at Jean's apartment. They argue when he sees that she plans to run out on him with the money. Jean threatens him with a gun, and during a scuffle, kills her.

Joe arrives at Jean's building, where Paul is waiting outside. He lights the unsuspecting Joe's cigarette and gives him the matchbook, then telephones the police and, posing as Joe, "confesses" that he just murdered Jean. Joe is tried for Jean's murder and convicted on circumstantial evidence, but escapes before his final lockup. Using Frank's cab to get around, and with the help of Betty to question the many possible suspects, Joe tracks down Paul using the passenger lists of Jean's voyage.

Paul discovers the ploy and has Joe apprehended. Joe convinces the police to question Paul. By matching partial fingerprints from the crime scene to those left by Paul at the police station, Paul is implicated in the murder and confesses. Sure now that luck cannot be bought, Joe embraces Betty.

== Cast ==
- Onslow Stevens as Joe Baldwin
- Helen Mack as Betty McKay
- Vinton Hayworth as Paul Vinette
- Paul Guilfoyle as Frank Bent
- Frank M. Thomas as Police Lt. Bond
- Richard Lane as Detective Mac McGrath
- Murray Alper as Chauffeur Spike Connors
- Hedda Hopper as Mrs. Agnes White
- Willie Best as Baggage handler

== Reception ==
According to RKO records the film made a profit of $24,000.

== See also ==
- List of films about horses
- List of films about horse racing
