= Law of the Underworld =

1938 film by Lew Landers

- Theatrical release poster
- Directed by: Lew Landers
- Screenplay by: Bert Granet; Edmund L. Hartmann
- Story by: John B. Hymer; Samuel Shipman
- Based on: Crime (play) by John B. Hymer; Samuel Shipman
- Produced by: Robert Sisk
- Starring: Chester Morris; Anne Shirley; Eduardo Ciannelli; Walter Abel; Richard Bond
- Cinematography: Nicholas Musuraca
- Edited by: Ted Cheesman
- Music by: Nathaniel Shilkret; Roy Webb
- Production company: RKO Pictures
- Distributed by: RKO Pictures
- Release date: May 6, 1938
- Running time: 61 minutes
- Country: United States
- Language: English

Law of the Underworld is a 1938 American drama film directed by Lew Landers and written by Bert Granet and Edmund L. Hartmann. The film stars Chester Morris, Anne Shirley, Eduardo Ciannelli, Walter Abel and Richard Bond. The film was released on May 6, 1938, by RKO Pictures.

== Plot ==
A respected citizen with secret ties to the local mob is faced with revealing his criminal connections to save two innocent people from execution.

== Cast ==
- Chester Morris as Gene Fillmore
- Anne Shirley as Annabelle Porter
- Eduardo Ciannelli as Rocky
- Walter Abel as Warren Rogers
- Richard Bond as Tommy Brown
- Lee Patrick as Dorothy Palmer
- Paul Guilfoyle as Batsy
- Frank M. Thomas as Police Captain Gargan
- Eddie Acuff as Bill
- Vinton Hayworth as Eddie
- Jack Carson as Johnny
- Paul Stanton as Barton
