= Quick Money =

1937 film by Edward Killy

- Directed by: Edward Killy
- Screenplay by: Arthur T. Horman; Franklin Coen; Bert Granet
- Story by: Arthur T. Horman
- Produced by: Maury M. Cohen
- Starring: Fred Stone; Gordon Jones; Dorothy Moore
- Cinematography: Nicholas Musuraca
- Edited by: George Crone
- Distributed by: RKO Radio Pictures
- Release date: December 10, 1937
- Running time: 59 min
- Country: United States
- Language: English
- Budget: $120,000
- Box office: $155,000

Quick Money is a 1937 American comedy film directed by Edward Killy and starring Fred Stone, Gordon Jones, and Dorothy Moore. The story was written by Arthur T. Horman.

== Cast ==
- Fred Stone as Mayor Jonas Tompkins
- Gordon Jones as Bill Adams
- Dorothy Moore as Alice Tompkins
- Berton Churchill as Bluford H. Smythe
- Paul Guilfoyle as Ambrose Ames
- Harlan Briggs as Thorndyke Barnsdale
- Dorothy Vaughan as Lyda Tompkins
- Sherwood Bailey as Freddie Tompkins
- Frank M. Thomas as Jim Clark
- Jack Carson as Coach Woodford
- Kathryn Sheldon as Mrs. Otis
- Dick Elliott as Jeffrey Walker
- Jim Farley as Sheriff Mart (as James Farley)
- Billy Franey as Hotel Clerk Walter (as William Franey)
- Fuzzy Knight as Peter Piper Potter
