= Danger Patrol =

1937 film directed by Lew Landers

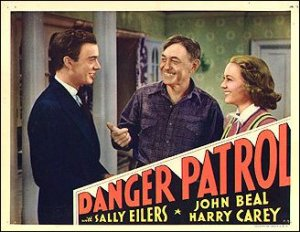
- Lobby card for the film
- Directed by: Lew Landers
- Screenplay by: Sy Bartlett
- Story by: Helen Vreeland; Hilda Vincent
- Produced by: Maury M. Cohen
- Starring: Sally Eilers; John Beal; Harry Carey
- Cinematography: Nicholas Musuraca
- Edited by: Ted Cheesman
- Production company: RKO Radio Pictures
- Distributed by: RKO Radio Pictures
- Release date: December 3, 1937 (US)
- Running time: 60 minutes
- Country: United States
- Language: English

Danger Patrol is a 1937 American drama film directed by Lew Landers from a screenplay by Sy Bartlett based on a story by Helen Vreeland and Hilda Vincent. Produced and distributed by RKO Radio Pictures, it was released on December 3, 1937, and stars Sally Eilers, John Beal, and Harry Carey.

== Plot ==
Dan Loring (John Beal) wants to be a medical student, but does not have the money for it. He takes a job as an apprentice with the Goliath Explosives Corp. transporting nitroglycerin—or as they like to call it, "soup"—to oil fields. He is trained by Sam "Easy" Street (Harry Carey), a veteran nitro handler, and soon promoted to a full-time nitro truck driver. Meanwhile, Dan begins to develop a romantic relationship with Sam's daughter, Cathy (Sally Eilers).

Because the explosive is so easily set off, the families of all the "soup handlers" live in fear that they will suddenly die. For years Cathy has been asking her father to leave the job, and he has been replying that he just needs to get some money saved up first, but he spends it too freely for this to ever happen. When Dan asks Cathy to marry him, she refuses to take that step, even though he too promises to quit as soon as he can afford medical school.

One day another driver, John "Gabby" Donovan (Edward Gargan), tells his long-suffering wife Nancy (Lee Patrick) that he has been given $1,000, and a month off, to take a delayed honeymoon with her. But he has one more delivery to make first, and dies in an explosion. Sam has previously favored Cathy and Dan's romance, but reconsiders in view of Nancy's grief and tries to break them up. Cathy then accepts the proposal of a rich suitor, Eric Trumble. As the wedding date approaches, though, she is distressed: her heart still belongs to Dan.

When an oil-well emergency near Tampico, Mexico, requires a shipment of nitro by airplane, Goliath boss "Rocky" Sanders (Frank M. Thomas) offers $1,000 to any employee who will travel with the nitro. Dan quickly volunteers, much to Sam's dismay. When Dan will not be dissuaded, Sam knocks him out with a sucker punch and takes over the job.

As the small plane approaches Tampico, fog closes in on the airport and the pilot cannot see where to land safely. He finally declares the intention to climb so they can parachute out, but Sam will not risk it crashing into the city. He demands the nitro be dropped safely into the sea or else he will set it off then and there. It does not matter anyway: just then the plane runs out of fuel. Sam grabs the radio microphone to leave a final message for Cathy, telling her to reunite with Dan "for me". They hear this themselves, as the transmissions are being monitored in Texas. The plane crashes and explodes, killing Sam and the pilot.

As Dan turns to Cathy to console her, she begs him, "Please don't let anything happen to us"; and he replies, "I won't."

== Cast ==
- Sally Eilers as Cathie Street
- John Beal as Dan Loring
- Harry Carey as Sam "Easy" Street
- Frank M. Thomas as Rocky Sanders
- Crawford Weaver as Eric Trumble
- Lee Patrick as Nancy Donovan
- Edward Gargan as Gabby Donovan
- Paul Guilfoyle as Tim
- Solly Ward as Stale Joke Julius
- Ann Hovey as Ada
- Richard Lane as Bill
- Walter Miller as Smokey Nelson
- George Shelley as Tommy Hayes
- Jack Arnold as Ed Novak
- Herman Brix as Joe

(Cast list as per AFI database.)

== Production ==
In May 1937, two secretaries who worked at 20th Century Fox, Helen Vreeland and Hilda Vincent sold their story entitled Highway to Hell to RKO Radio Pictures. Shortly after, RKO assigned Sy Bartlett to turn the story into a screenplay. In September, Lew Landers was tagged to direct the film, while Maury Cohen was selected to handle the production. In mid-September, it was announced that John Beal and Sally Eilers would join the cast, followed shortly by the addition of Harry Carey, Lee Patrick, Frank Thomas, Ed Gargan, Paul Guilfoyle, and Herman Brix. The picture was filmed during September, and by the 22nd was being edited. At the beginning of October RKO changed the title of the film from Highway to Hell to Danger Patrol. In early November it was announced that RKO would be releasing Danger Patrol on December 3, 1937. The National Legion of Decency gave the film an A-1 grade, rating it suitable for all audiences.

== Reception ==
The Film Daily gave the film a good review, calling it a "neatly done picture with suspense, drama, and excitement." They appreciated the acting of both Beal and Eilers, and also highlighted the supporting performances of Frank Thomas, Ed Gargan and Paul Guilfoyle. They felt the cinematography was good, as was the direction, which they felt maintained a good pace. However, Harrison's Reports did not enjoy the film, saying it was only "moderately entertaining". Unlike The Film Daily, they felt the movie was slowly paced, and had too much dialogue and not enough action.
