= Pacific Liner =

1939 film by Lew Landers

- Theatrical film poster
- Directed by: Lew Landers
- Screenplay by: John Twist
- Story by: Anthony Coldeway; Henry Roberts Symonds
- Produced by: Robert Sisk
- Starring: Victor McLaglen; Chester Morris; Wendy Barrie
- Cinematography: Nicholas Musuraca
- Edited by: Harry Marker
- Music by: Robert Russell Bennett (uncredited)
- Distributed by: RKO Radio Pictures
- Release date: January 6, 1939
- Running time: 76 mins.
- Country: United States
- Language: English
- Budget: $241,000
- Box office: $508,000

Pacific Liner is a 1939 American action/adventure film directed by Lew Landers. The film stars Victor McLaglen, Chester Morris and Wendy Barrie. Pacific Liner is primarily set in the engineering section of the vessel, where a stowaway has infected the crew with cholera. While the passengers remain oblivious, the ship's doctor (Morris) and nurse (Barrie) work to control the infection and heal their patients while the engineer (McLaglen)—who scoffs at "bugs"—keeps the stokers at their jobs filling the ship's boilers with coal to make the best time to San Francisco. (Note: The real S.S. Arcturus was a passenger liner of the Finland Steamship Company operating primarily on the route between Hanko, Finland and Hull, England via Copenhagen, Denmark.)

== Plot ==
In 1932, aboard the passenger ship S.S. Arcturus, engineer "Crusher" McKay runs a "tight ship", both beloved and feared by his men. The ship's doctor, "Doc" Tony Craig, has signed on in Shanghai to be on the San Francisco-bound trip. He wants to be near his former sweetheart, nurse Ann Grayson.

Crusher is also attracted to Ann, but his clumsy courtship soon sets up a rivalry between him and Doc. While under way, Crusher discovers a sick Chinese stowaway below decks, but does not show him to Doc until morning. The man is dead, from "Asiatic cholera." Doc injects everyone and institutes sanitation procedures, but Crusher is contemptuous. He has to be tricked into getting the injection and defiantly arranges a blowout in the engineering crew mess. The first case, Britcher, collapses there. The doors to the decks above are bolted shut, to maintain a quarantine and so that passengers have no idea of what is happening below. Meanwhile, the disease spreads through the stokers down below.

Crusher keeps his men working, but one by one, they are stricken with cholera. Ann and Doc try to keep the disease isolated. The dead stokers and their mattresses and blankets are fed into the steamship's boilers. One man desperate to escape this fate crawls out into the hold and through a porthole to his death in the sea. Crusher falls ill, and when he has not been seen for days, his men believe he is dead. In fact, he and the surviving patients are recovering. Deadeye talks some of the men into mutiny. They brandish shovelfuls of burning coal at Doc, but then Crusher appears and sends them back to their posts, before returning to his bunk. Crusher is looking forward to a promised night on the town with Anne—a promise she made, under Doc's orders, to keep Crusher in bed.

The Arcturus arrives safely to San Francisco, two hours ahead of schedule. The port authorities find that the quarantine was so good that the passengers may be released—oblivious to what happened below. Ann and Doc have rekindled their previous romance and are planning to marry and head off to his next job, in Guatemala. Crusher saves face by telling Anne that he is giving her the air—he is not interested in marriage. He tells his pet bird Chicken that he might run up to Portland to marry his girlfriend there. The bird speaks for the first time: "You dumb dodo!"

== Cast ==
- Victor McLaglen as "Crusher" McKay
- Wendy Barrie as Ann Grayson
- Chester Morris as Doctor Tony Craig
- John Bleifer as Kovac
- Barry Fitzgerald as "Britches"
- Paul Guilfoyle as Wishart
- Alan Hale Sr. as Gallagher
- Halliwell Hobbes as Captain Mathews
- Ernest Whitman as “Professor”
- Cyrus W. Kendall as "Deadeyes"
- Adia Kuznetzoff as Silvio
- Allan Lane as Bilson
- Emory Parnell as Olaf
- John Wray as Metcalfe
- Eddie Bracken as Junior officer (uncredited)
- Anthony Warde as Crew Member (uncredited)

== Production ==
Principal photography on Pacific Liner began mid-October 1938. In 1937, RKO corporate head Leo Spitz had moved away from the earlier "prestige pictures" that had often been critically acclaimed but financial disasters. He had not invested heavily in projects such as Pacific Liner, which had been originally intended to be released as an "exploitation quickie". With reliable B-movie director Lew Landers in charge, however, the result was predictably brought "... to the screen with his usual feeling for action, and attention to narrative development ...", belying its modest status as a "B".

Along with a first-rate cast with both stock players and featured performers as well as a believable storyline, Pacific Liner also had the benefit of a "lavish shipboard set ... with art deco trimmings", courtesy of art director Van Nest Polglase and his assistant Albert D'Agostino, known especially for their elaborate sets in Astaire-Rogers musicals. A full-size steamship set, the first that RKO had made for their typical budget features, had mainly interior rooms but also included an exterior section with a gangplank for passengers to come on board. A large scale model was used for long shots showing the entire passenger vessel. (Note: The cost of the set was amortized over the years and it appeared again as the setting for RKO's The Ghost Ship (1943), a low budget film that could use the still standing set.)

== Reception ==
Variety announced that RKO's Pacific Liner was "filler in the duals" (the lower half of a double bill). The film, however, rose far above its humble origins, not only making a profit of $87,000, but with generally favourable reviews coming in, RKO consequently moved it to the top of the bill for six weeks in major theatre markets. The film was also nominated at the 1939 Academy Awards for Best Original Score.
