= Lew Landers =

American film and television director (1901–1962)

- Born: Louis Friedlander; January 2, 1901; New York City, U.S.
- Died: December 16, 1962 (aged 61); Palm Desert, California, U.S.
- Other names: Louis Friedlander; Louis Friedländer; Louis Friendlander
- Occupations: Film and television director

Louis Friedlander (January 2, 1901 – December 16, 1962), known by the stage name Lew Landers, was an American film and television director. He was active from the silent era to the early 1960s, directing over 170 productions.

== Biography ==
Born Louis Friedlander in New York City in 1901, Landers began his movie career as an actor. In 1914, he appeared in two features: D.W. Griffith's drama The Escape and the comedy short Admission – Two Pins, under his birth name. He became an assistant director at Universal Pictures in 1922. He began making films in the 1930s, one of his early ones being the Boris Karloff / Bela Lugosi thriller The Raven (1935).

After directing a few more features, he changed his name to Lew Landers and directed more than 100 films in a variety of genres, including Westerns, comedies, and horror movies. He worked for every major film studio—and many minor ones—during his career. Since 1943, he began to alternate his movie work with directing television series, including two episodes of Adventures of Superman and the campy Captain John Smith and Pocahontas.

== Death ==
On December 16, 1962, Landers died of a heart attack in Palm Desert, California. His grave is located at Chapel of the Pines Crematory.

== In popular culture ==
Actor Jim McKrell played a TV news reporter named Lew Landers in two films directed by Joe Dante: The Howling (1981) and Gremlins (1984).

== Partial filmography ==
- The Vanishing Shadow (1934)
- The Red Rider (1934)
- Tailspin Tommy (serial) (1934)
- Rustlers of Red Dog (1935)
- The Call of the Savage (1935)
- The Raven (1935)
- Without Orders (1936)
- Night Waitress (1936)
- Flight from Glory (1937)
- Living on Love (1937)
- Danger Patrol (1937)
- You Can't Buy Luck (1937)
- The Man Who Found Himself (1937)
- Border Cafe (1937)
- They Wanted to Marry (1937)
- Annabel Takes a Tour (1938)
- Blind Alibi (1938)
- The Affairs of Annabel (1938)
- Crashing Hollywood (1938)
- Double Danger (1938)
- Law of the Underworld (1938)
- Smashing the Rackets (1938)
- Sky Giant (1938)
- Condemned Women (1938)
- Fixer Dugan (1939)
- Bad Lands (1939)
- Conspiracy (1939)
- The Girl and the Gambler (1939)
- Twelve Crowded Hours (1939)
- Pacific Liner (1939)
- Enemy Agent (1940)
- La Conga Nights (1940)
- Ski Patrol (1940)
- Harvard, Here I Come! (1941)
- Back in the Saddle (1941)
- The Boogie Man Will Get You (1942)
- The Man Who Returned to Life (1942)
- Junior Army (1942)
- Stand By All Networks (1942)
- Submarine Raider (1942)
- Atlantic Convoy (1942)
- Power of the Press (1943)
- After Midnight with Boston Blackie (1943)
- Doughboys in Ireland (1943)
- The Return of the Vampire (1943)
- Stars on Parade (1944)
- The Ghost That Walks Alone (1944)
- Crime, Inc. (1945)
- The Power of the Whistler (1945)
- The Mask of Diijon (1946)
- A Close Call for Boston Blackie (1946)
- The Truth About Murder (1946)
- Death Valley (1946)
- Devil Ship (1947)
- The Son of Rusty (1947)
- Danger Street (1947)
- Public Prosecutor (TV series, 1947–48)
- Adventures of Gallant Bess (1948)
- My Dog Rusty (1948)
- Inner Sanctum (1948)
- Stagecoach Kid (1949)
- Barbary Pirate (1949)
- Air Hostess (1949)
- Law of the Barbary Coast (1949)
- Chain Gang (1950)
- Davy Crockett, Indian Scout (1950)
- State Penitentiary (1950)
- Revenue Agent (1950)
- Last of the Buccaneers (1950)
- Beauty on Parade (1950)
- Dynamite Pass (1950)
- Tyrant of the Sea (1950)
- Girls' School (1950)
- Jungle Manhunt (1951)
- When the Redskins Rode (1951)
- The Magic Carpet (1951)
- The Big Gusher (1951)
- Arctic Flight (1952)
- Aladdin and His Lamp (1952)
- California Conquest (1952)
- Jungle Jim in the Forbidden Land (1952)
- Terry and the Pirates (9 episodes, 1953)
- Run for the Hills (1953)
- Captain John Smith and Pocahontas (1953)
- Tangier Incident (1953)
- Meet Corliss Archer (1 episode, 1954)
- Science Fiction Theatre (1 episode, 1955)
- Tales of the Texas Rangers (10 episodes, 1955–1957)
- Casey Jones (4 episodes, 1957–1958)
- Highway Patrol (10 episodes, 1955–1959)
- Mackenzie's Raiders (9 episodes, 1958–1959)
- Tombstone Territory (2 episodes, 1959–1960)
- The Alaskans (1 episode, 1960)
- Sugarfoot (2 episodes, 1961)
- Bat Masterson (4 episodes, 1959–1961)
- Terrified (1962)
