= Society Lawyer =

1939 film by Edwin L. Marin

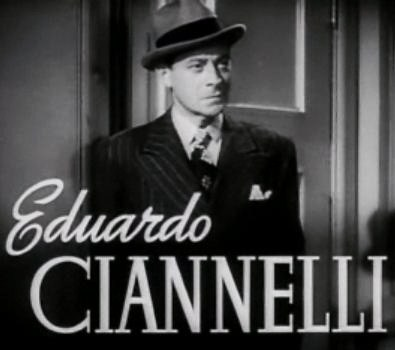
- Eduardo Ciannelli in the film
- Directed by: Edwin L. Marin
- Screenplay by: Frances Goodrich; Albert Hackett; Leon Gordon; Hugo Butler
- Based on: Penthouse; 1935 novel by Arthur Somers Roche
- Produced by: John W. Considine Jr. Louis D. Lighton
- Starring: Walter Pidgeon; Virginia Bruce
- Cinematography: George J. Folsey
- Edited by: Howard O'Neill
- Music by: Edward Ward
- Production company: Metro-Goldwyn-Mayer
- Release date: March 21, 1939
- Running time: 77 minutes
- Country: United States
- Language: English
- Budget: $232,000
- Box office: $472,000

Society Lawyer is a 1939 crime film directed by Edwin L. Marin and starring Walter Pidgeon and Virginia Bruce. It is a milder remake of the pre-Code Penthouse (1933).

== Cast ==
- Walter Pidgeon as Christopher Durant
- Virginia Bruce as Pat Abbott
- Leo Carrillo as Tony Gazotti
- Eduardo Ciannelli as Jim Crelliman
- Lee Bowman as Phil Siddall
- Frances Mercer as Sue Leonard
- Ann Morriss as Judy Barton
- Herbert Mundin as Layton
- Frank M. Thomas as Lieutenant Stevens

== Box office ==
According to MGM records the film made $312,000 in the US and Canada and $160,000 elsewhere resulting in a profit of $64,000.
