= Arctic Flight =

1952 drama film directed by Lew Landers

- Theatrical poster
- Directed by: Lew Landers
- Written by: Robert Hill; George Bricker
- Based on: Shadow of the Curtain by Ewing Scott
- Produced by: Lindsley Parsons
- Starring: Wayne Morris; Alan Hale Jr.; Lola Albright
- Cinematography: John L. Russell
- Edited by: Ace Herman
- Music by: Edward J. Kay
- Production company: Monogram Pictures
- Distributed by: Monogram Pictures
- Release date: October 19, 1952
- Running time: 78 minutes
- Country: United States
- Language: English

Arctic Flight is a 1952 American drama film directed by Lew Landers and starring Wayne Morris, Alan Hale Jr. and Lola Albright. It was produced and distributed by Monogram Pictures. Arctic Flight depicts bush flying in the Arctic region on the edge of the International Date Line, involving Soviet intrigue.

== Plot ==
In a small plane, bush pilot Mike Wien flies his friend Dave Karluck over a reindeer herd that Dave owns in Alaska. From the plane, Dave shoots a wolf that was preying on the deer.

Returning to his base at Kotzebue, Mike expects his next customer to be John Wetherby, who wants to hunt polar bears. He encounters Martha Raymond, who is expecting him to fly her to Little Diomede Island, where she will work as a schoolteacher and nurse in the local Eskimo village. Only two miles from Little Diomede across the frozen Bering Strait (and across the International Date Line) is the Soviet-owned Big Diomede Island, and Mike refuses the trip, as the trigger-happy Soviet border guards may shoot at them. However, with no other pilot available, Mike's government contract requires him to take the flight. He flies Martha most of the way and then borrows a dog sled to transport her. A romance between the two is kindled.

When Martha arrives, she is welcomed by Catholic priest Father François and resident Miksook. They tell her that the teacher whom she is replacing had wandered too close to Big Diomede and was shot and killed.

Mike meets Wetherby and flies him from Nome to Kotzebue. Bad weather delays the hunt and Wetherby asks to visit Little Diomede. He wonders whether Saranna, an Eskimo girl in Kotzebue, is Mike's fiancée, but she is not.

After some days, Saranna tells Mike that Dave has been mauled in a polar bear attack. Mike and Wetherby find the polar bear and Wetherby kills it. As they are about to leave, Wetherby's wallet falls and Mike sees a Soviet identity card inside. Wetherby injures Mike with his skinning knife and flies Mike to Little Diomede, where Martha can treat the wound.

Mike confides in Martha that Wetherby did not stab him accidentally and is not whom he claims to be. Martha is afraid that Mike is delirious but finds Wetherby's identification card, leading to a confrontation. Mike comes to her rescue but is knocked unconscious. However, in his haste to travel to the Soviet base on Big Diomede, Wetherby leaves behind his photos of American defense installations as well as his identification card. When he reaches Big Diomede without it, he is shot and killed by the sentries. Martha and Mike realize that Wetherby was a spy and that their efforts have stopped his plan to deliver military secrets to the Soviets.

== Cast ==
- Wayne Morris as Mike Wein
- Alan Hale Jr. as John W. Wetherby
- Lola Albright as Martha Raymond
- Carol Thurston as Saranna Koonuk
- Phil Tead as "Squid" Tucker
- Thomas Richards Sr. as Dave Karluck
- Anthony Garson as Miksook
- Kenneth MacDonald as Father François
- Paul Bryar as "Happy" Hogan
- Dale Van Sickel as Joe Dorgan

== Production ==
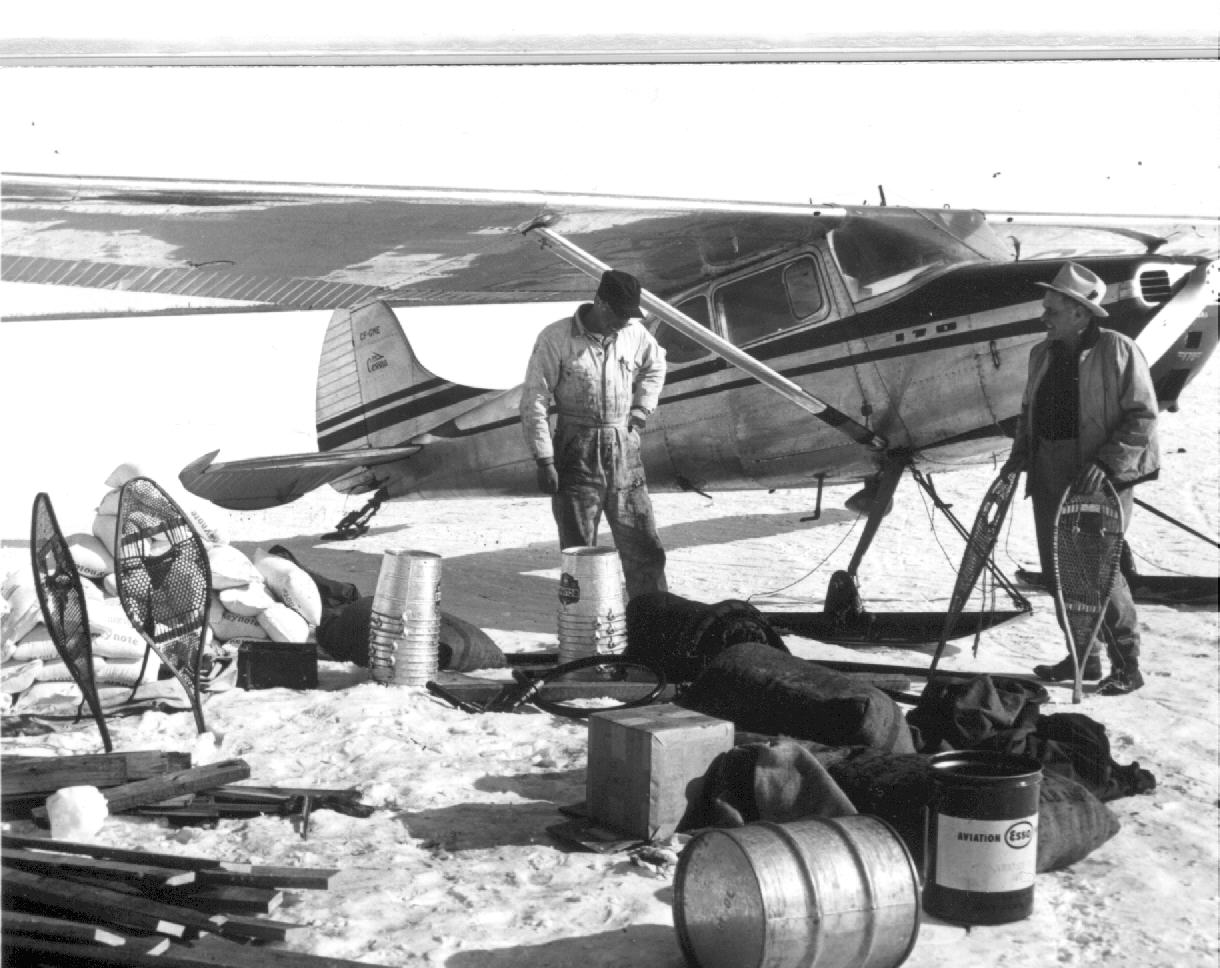
The Cessna 170B was a bush plane workhorse used in Arctic Flight.

Principal photography for Arctic Flight took place from late February to early April 1952 at Little Diomede Island in Alaska and at KTTV's studios in Los Angeles. Ewing Scott directed most of the Alaskan footage but was replaced by Lew Landers after a recurrence of a leg injury. A Cessna 170B (N1470D) was used as the bush plane flown by the lead character.
