= The Mad Miss Manton =

1938 film by Leigh Jason

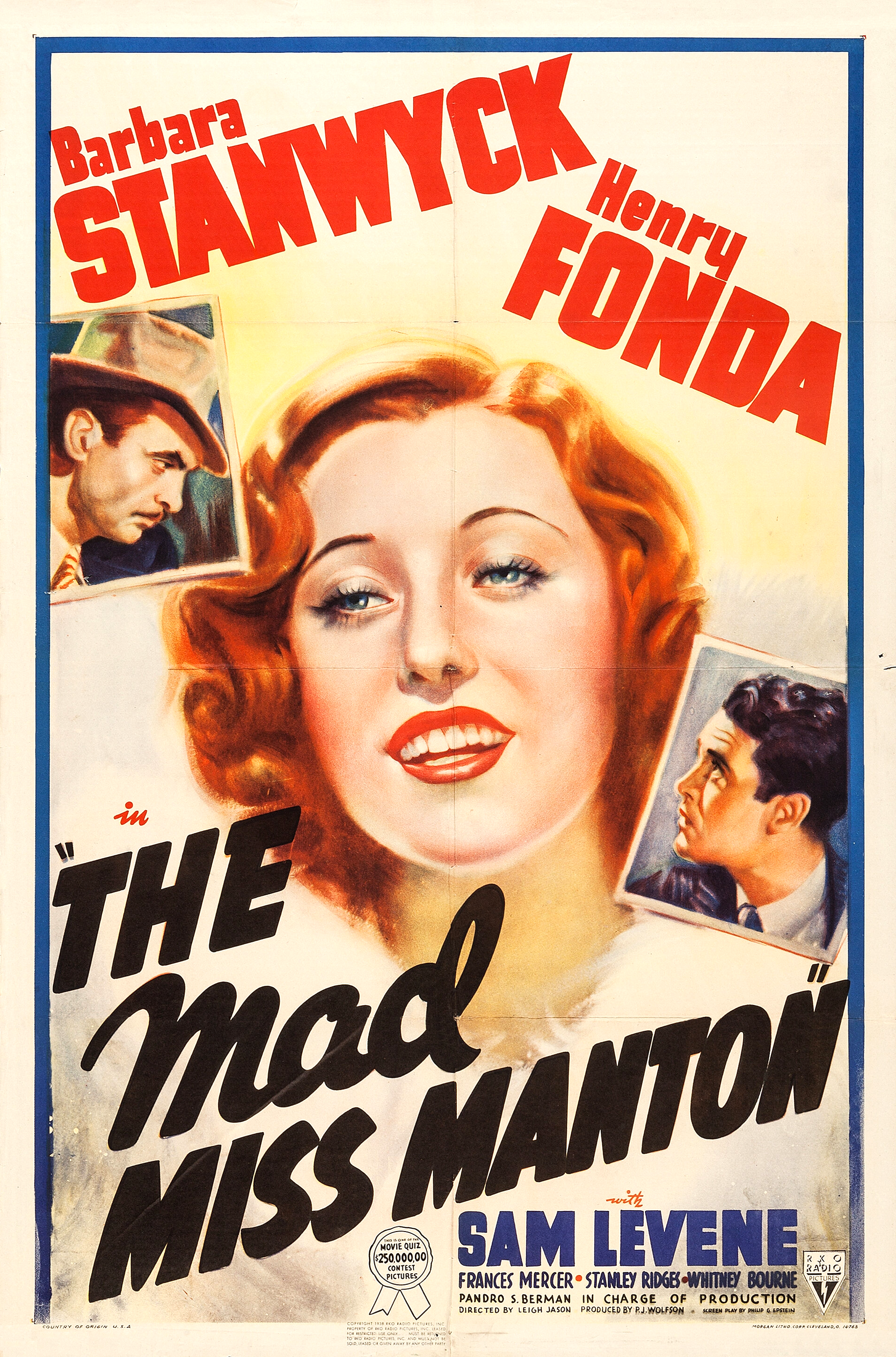
- Theatrical release poster
- Directed by: Leigh Jason
- Screenplay by: Philip G. Epstein
- Story by: Wilson Collison
- Produced by: P. J. Wolfson
- Starring: Barbara Stanwyck; Henry Fonda; Sam Levene; Frances Mercer; Stanley Ridges; Whitney Bourne
- Cinematography: Nicholas Musuraca
- Edited by: George Hively
- Music by: Roy Webb
- Production company: RKO Radio Pictures
- Distributed by: RKO Radio Pictures
- Release date: October 21, 1938
- Running time: 80 minutes
- Country: United States
- Language: English
- Budget: $383,000
- Box office: $716,000

The Mad Miss Manton is a 1938 American screwball comedy-mystery film directed by Leigh Jason and starring Barbara Stanwyck as fun-loving socialite Melsa Manton and Henry Fonda as newspaper editor Peter Ames. Melsa and her debutante friends hunt for a murderer while eating bonbons, flirting with Ames, and otherwise behaving like irresponsible socialites. Ames is also after the murderer, as well as Melsa's hand in marriage.

This was the first of three screen pairings for Stanwyck and Fonda, the others being The Lady Eve and You Belong to Me.

== Plot ==
At 3:00 am, Melsa Manton takes her little dogs for a walk. Near a subway construction site, she sees Ronnie Belden run out of a house and drive away. The house is for sale by Sheila Lane, the wife of George Lane, a wealthy banker. Inside, Melsa finds a diamond brooch and George's dead body. As she runs for help, her cloak falls off with the brooch inside it. When the police arrive, the body, cloak, and brooch are gone. Melsa and her friends are notorious pranksters, so Lieutenant Mike Brent, does nothing to investigate the murder. Peter Ames writes an editorial decrying Melsa's "prank", and she sues him for libel.

Melsa and her friends decide they must find the murderer in order to defend their reputation. The resulting manhunt includes searches of the Lane house, Belden's apartment, Lane's business office, and all of the local beauty shops; two attempts to intimidate Melsa; two shooting attempts on her life: at a charity ball, and a trap set for the murderer using Melsa as bait. The women twice attack Ames and tie him up, although Melsa's friend Myra Frost enthusiastically flirts with him.

Meanwhile, Melsa is approached by Frances Glesk who is now the girlfriend of Sheila's ex-husband Edward Norris, a former convict, who has just finished a 10-year stretch at Joliet Correctional Center. She claims an alibi that she and Eddie were at a hockey game at the time of the murders and the ten minutes Eddie took for a smoke break at the intermission wasn't enough time for him to be at the scene of the crime.

While Mike repeatedly accuses innocent people based on incorrect theories, Melsa deduces that Ronnie removed the body and cloak from the Lane house before the police arrived. An escaping would-be killer leaves behind a piece of tar paper, which reminds Melsa of the subway construction site. Returning to the site, she finds a fast electric cart on the track. This is how Norris made his way to and from the crime scene in ten minutes. Edward is captured after confessing to the murders and briefly holding Melsa and Peter hostage at gunpoint.

During the film, the relationship between Melsa and Peter evolves from sharp animosity to love and engagement. He almost immediately decides that he is going to marry her and begins to woo her aggressively. After the police rescue them from Edward, Melsa and Peter plan their honeymoon.

== Cast ==
- Barbara Stanwyck as Melsa Manton, a wealthy socialite who has organized a pranking club with her friends
- Henry Fonda as Peter Ames, editor of The Morning Clarion
- Sam Levene as Lieutenant Mike Brent, a bumbling police detective
- Frances Mercer as Helen Frayne, Melsa's sensible friend
- Stanley Ridges as Edward Norris, a convicted murderer
- Whitney Bourne as Pat James, Melsa's food-loving friend
- Vicki Lester as Kit Beverly, one of Melsa's friends
- Ann Evers as Lee Wilson, one of Melsa's friends
- Linda Perry as Myra Frost (billed as Linda Terry), Melsa's flirtatious friend
- Eleanor Hansen as Jane, one of Melsa's friends
- Catherine O'Quinn as Dora, Melsa's anti-communist friend (always calling Myra a communist)
- Hattie McDaniel as Hilda (billed as Hattie McDaniels), Melsa's grumpy housekeeper
- James Burke as Sullivan, Brent's assistant
- Paul Guilfoyle as Bat Regan, owner of a gambling house
- Penny Singleton as Frances Glesk
- Leona Maricle as Sheila Lane
- Kay Sutton as Gloria Hamilton
- Miles Mander as Mr. Thomas
- Grady Sutton as D.A.'s Secretary
- John Qualen as Subway Watchman
- Olin Howland as Mr X
- George Chandler as Newspaper Man (uncredited)
- Byron Foulger as Assistant Editor (uncredited)

== Reception ==
On the review aggregator website Rotten Tomatoes, 84% of 44 critics' reviews are positive. The website's consensus reads: "Henry Fonda and Barbara Stanwyck prove a charming pair in The Mad Miss Manton, a madcap mystery that blends comedy and thrills to entertaining effect."

The film made a profit of $88,000.
