= Without Orders =

1936 American film directed by Lew Landers

- Theatrical film poster
- Directed by: Lew Landers; Charles Kerr (assistant)
- Screenplay by: J. Robert Bren; Edmund L. Hartmann
- Based on: "Without Orders" by Peter B. Kyne
- Produced by: Samuel Briskin; Cliff Reid
- Starring: Sally Eilers; Robert Armstrong; Frances Sage; Charley Grapewin; Vinton Haworth
- Cinematography: J. Roy Hunt
- Edited by: Desmond Marquette
- Music by: Max Steiner; Roy Webb
- Production company: RKO Radio Pictures
- Distributed by: RKO Pictures
- Release date: October 23, 1936
- Running time: 64 minutes
- Country: United States
- Language: English

Without Orders is a 1936 American drama film directed by Lew Landers and starring Sally Eilers, Robert Armstrong, Frances Sage, Charley Grapewin and Vinton Haworth. It was produced by RKO Radio Pictures, who released the picture on October 23, 1936. The screenplay was written by Samuel Briskin and Cliff Reid, based on the short story of the same name by Peter B. Kyne, which had appeared in the February 8, 1936 edition of Collier's magazine.

== Plot ==
At Portland, Oregon, playboy pilot Len Kendrick (Vinton Haworth) lands at the end of a cross-country record flight, met by his father J.P. Kendrick (Charley Grapewin) who owns Amalgamated Air Lines. Len is a media darling, adored by fans for his daring flights. He is in love with Amalgamated stewardess Kay Armstrong (Sally Eilers) who is dating veteran pilot "Wad" Madison (Robert Armstrong). Len dates her sister Penny (Frances Sage) who learns that his hard-drinking and recklessness has caused the death of his co-pilot. Penny knows that he was drinking before the fateful flight and only escaped prosecution by bribing a bartender. She leaves Len who ends up at Amalgamated as a line pilot, being tutored by Wad.

Len pursues Kay, and she falls for his charm but asks her sister for advice about marrying him. Realizing that marriage would be a mistake, Penny tells Len that she will expose him; he angrily reacts by knocking her down, fracturing her skull. On an outbound flight, Len attempts to rush Kay into accepting a proposal of marriage but she learns that her sister is seriously injured and in the hospital. Kay asks Wad to fly her back to Portland. On the same flight, Len locks his rival out of the cockpit, takes over the flight and after landing at the airline's home base, accuses Wad of cowardice and dereliction of duty, resulting in a fistfight between the two men. Wad is fired, but finds out from Penny that Len has a terrible secret to hide.

On a flight to Salt Lake City, Len's aircraft not only has been battling a blizzard for hours, but also experiences engine trouble. Instead of landing, in a repeat of the earlier tragic incident, Len knocks out his co-pilot, and again takes to a parachute, leaving Key and the passengers behind. This time, his parachute fails to open. Wad radios instructions to Kay who takes over the controls and successfully makes an emergency landing. Kay and Wad are hailed as heroes and, after the veteran pilot gets back his old job, take up where they had left off.

== Cast ==
- Sally Eilers as Kay Armstrong
- Robert Armstrong as "Wad" Madison
- Frances Sage as Penny Armstrong
- Charley Grapewin as J.P. Kendrick
- Vinton Hayworth as Len Kendrick
- Ward Bond as Tim Casey
- Frank M. Thomas as Arthur Trueman
- May Boley as Mrs. Maddy Overhose
- Arthur Loft as Air Controller Calkins
- Walter Miller as Commerce Airline Inspector

== Production ==
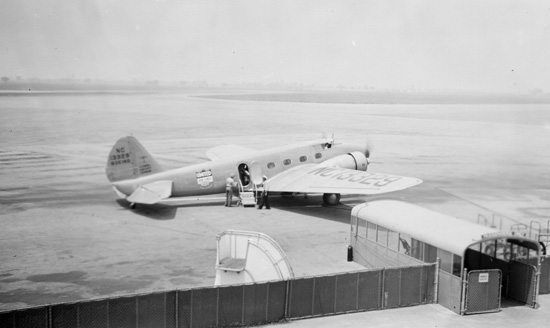
A Boeing 247 airliner was featured prominently in Without Orders.

Without Orders was directed by B-movie specialist Lew Landers, who would eventually helm nine aviation films including Flight from Glory (1937), Sky Giant (1938), Air Hostess (1939) and Arctic Flight (1952). The stars of Without Orders also had appeared in many aviation-themed films, with Sally Eilers starring in three films and Robert Armstrong in eight films. (Note: A flight attendant taking over the controls of an aircraft in distress was reputedly first played out in Without Orders, later becoming a commonplace plot device.)

Without Orders was primarily filmed from August 3 to late-August 1936, at the Grand Central Air Terminal at Glendale, California which stood in for both the Portland and Salt Lake City airports. The aircraft that was featured as the Amalgamated Air Lines airliner was the first Boeing 247D (NC2666), leased from Philips Petroleum Co. A Ryan ST-A was the aircraft seen as the record-breaking aircraft.

== Reception ==
Without Orders was reviewed by B.R. Crisler at The New York Times. He noted that the film "... deals with that previously celebrated conflict between stunt and transport piloting, nor exactly revolutionary in treatment, 'Without Orders' nonetheless, manages to be endurable and even fairly exciting aero-drama." Aviation film historian James Farmer considered Without Orders, "above average" although the plot was a hackneyed love triangle.
