= Mr. Doodle Kicks Off =

1938 film by Leslie Goodwins

- Theatrical release poster
- Directed by: Leslie Goodwins
- Screenplay by: Bert Granet
- Story by: Mark Kelly
- Produced by: Robert Sisk
- Starring: Joe Penner; June Travis; Richard Lane; Ben Alexander; Billy Gilbert
- Cinematography: Russell Metty
- Edited by: Ted Cheesman
- Music by: Roy Webb
- Production company: RKO Pictures
- Distributed by: RKO Pictures
- Release date: October 7, 1938
- Running time: 75 minutes
- Country: United States
- Language: English

Mr. Doodle Kicks Off is a 1938 American comedy film directed by Leslie Goodwins and written by Bert Granet. The film stars Joe Penner, June Travis, Richard Lane, Ben Alexander and Billy Gilbert. The film was released on October 7, 1938, by RKO Pictures.

== Plot ==
Ellory Bugs has offered a huge donation to his old alma mater, Taylor Tech, which is to be paid only if his son, Jimmie "Doodle" Bugs, becomes a football hero. But "Doodle" tips the scales at 143 pounds and is more interested in the band than the football team. Janice Martin, daughter of the college president, is the great thing in "Doodle's" life, but she despises him and has eyes only for Mickey Wells, the school football star. "Doodle" is consoled by Professor Minorous, of the Greek Mythology department who tells him that the gods will solve all of his problems, and starts right in to make communications with these worthies by means of countless and meaningless blackboard equations.

== Cast ==
- Joe Penner as Jimmie 'Doodle' Bugs
- June Travis as Janice Martin
- Richard Lane as Assistant Coach 'Offsides' Jones
- Ben Alexander as Larry Weldon
- Billy Gilbert as Professor Minorous
- Jack Carson as Football Player Rochet
- Alan Bruce as Mickey Wells
- George Irving as College President Martin
- William B. Davidson as Ellory Bugs, Jimmie's Father
- Pierre Watkin as Mr. Wondel
- Frank M. Thomas as Coach Hammond
- Wesley Barry as 1st Sophomore
- Robert Parrish as 2nd Sophomore

== See also ==
- List of American football films
