= Bernard Newman (designer) =

American fashion and movie costume designer

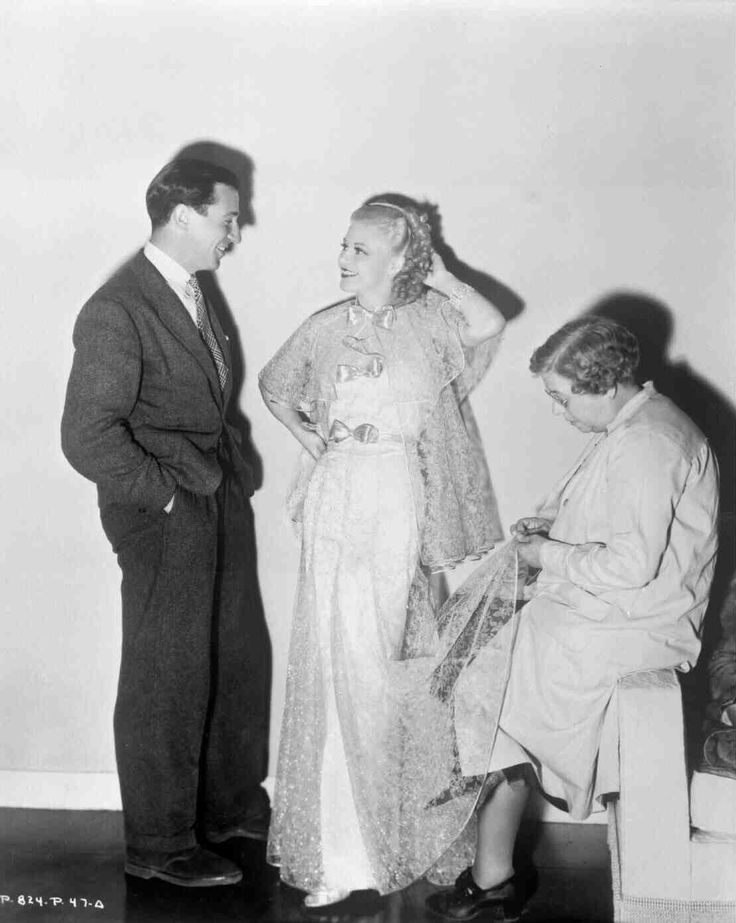
- Bernard Newman, Ginger Rogers, and a seamstress in 1935
- Born: November 18, 1903; Joplin, Missouri
- Died: November 30, 1966 (aged 63); New York City, New York
- Occupation: Costume designer
- Spouse: Helen Keeler (m. 1935, div. ?)

Bernard Newman (18 November 1903 – 30 November 1966) was the head designer for Bergdorf Goodman and head costume designer for RKO Pictures. He designed costumes for some 35 movies, dressing stars including Ginger Rogers, Katharine Hepburn, Lucille Ball and Helen Broderick. He was posthumously included in the Costume Designers Guild Hall of Fame in 2004.

== Biography ==
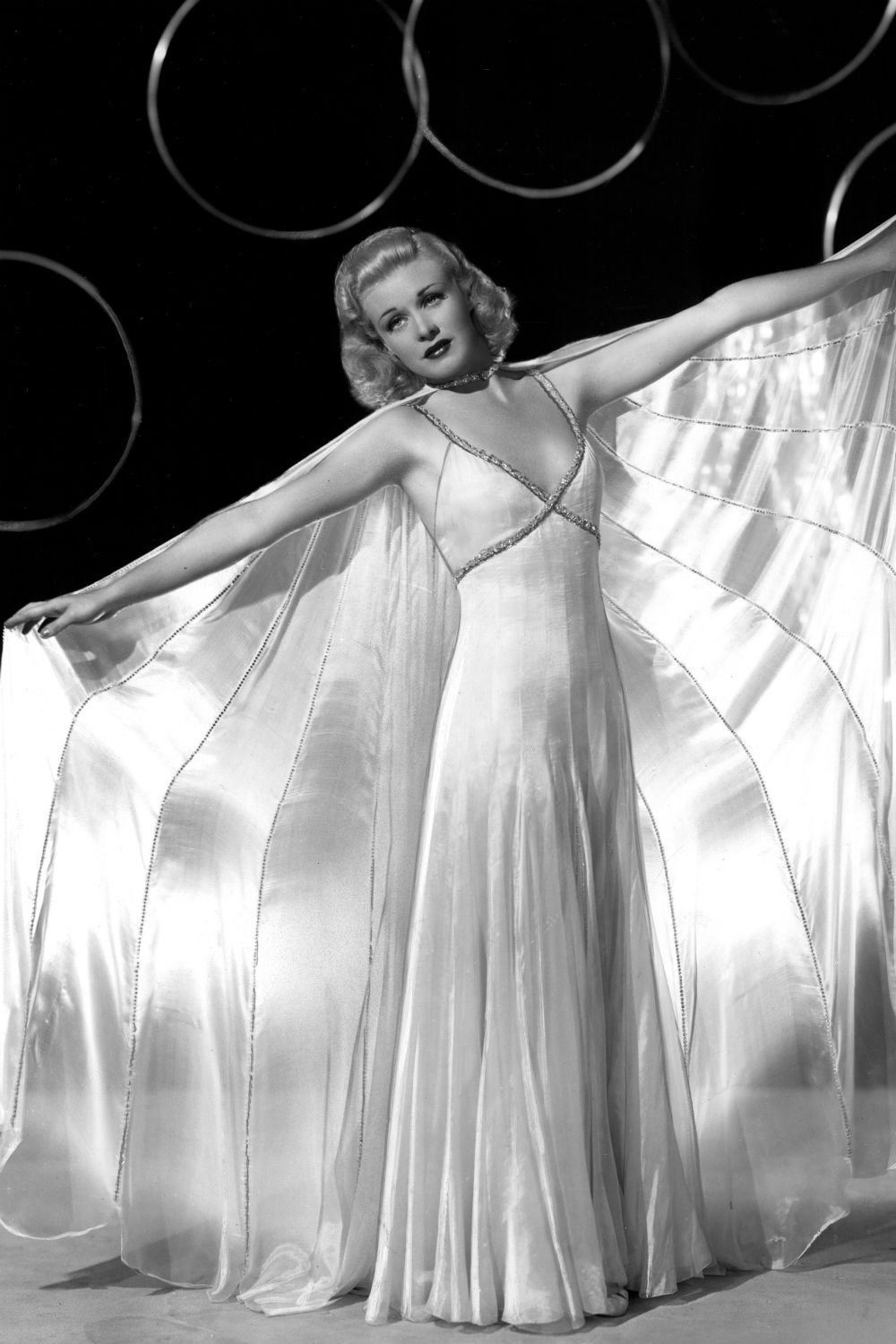
Design for Ginger Rogers in Swing Time's "Never Gonna Dance", 1936

Bernard Newman was born in Joplin, Missouri in 1903. He studied in Paris at the Art Student's League. He started working at Bergdorf Goodman, a luxury goods department store in Manhattan, as a window dresser. He later became the head designer for Bergdorf Goodman, and his clothes were worn by film stars like Kay Francis.

Newman started working as costume designer in the film industry in 1933, mainly for RKO Pictures. In 1934, he was hired by the studio to design for the upcoming Fred Astaire and Ginger Rogers film Roberta. The film took place in a Parisian fashion house and was an ideal opportunity for Newman to display his talents. The major success of Roberta secured Newman the position of head designer at RKO. Fifteen of Newman's costumes for the movie were reproduced and merchandised by the Modern Merchandising Bureau.

Newman's films with Ginger Rogers were his most frequent and successful collaborations in Hollywood. His designs feature in four of her popular 1930s musicals with Fred Astaire, Roberta, Top Hat, Follow the Fleet, and Swing Time. He created a blue dress with ostrich feathers, to Rogers's specification, which she wore in the "Cheek to Cheek" sequence of Top Hat. Its tendency to shed feathers as Rogers danced earned her the nickname of "Feathers" from the film's crew and co-star Fred Astaire. Other films he worked on include Sylvia Scarlett with Katharine Hepburn and You Can't Take It with You.

== Filmography ==
Year	Film	Starring
1933	Rafter Romance	Ginger Rogers
1935	Roberta	Irene Dunne, Ginger Rogers, Fred Astaire
1935	Star of Midnight	Ginger Rogers, William Powell
1935	Break of Hearts	Katharine Hepburn, Charles Boyer
1935	The Nitwits	Wheeler & Woolsey
1935	Top Hat	Fred Astaire and Ginger Rogers
1935	I Dream Too Much	Henry Fonda, Lily Pons
1935	In Person	Ginger Rogers
1935	Sylvia Scarlett	Katharine Hepburn, Cary Grant
1935	The Lady Consents	Ann Harding, Herbert Marshall
1935	Two in the Dark	Walter Abel, Margot Grahame
1935	Follow the Fleet	Fred Astaire and Ginger Rogers
1936	The Witness Chair	Ann Harding, Walter Abel
1936	The Bride Walks Out	Barbara Stanwyck, Gene Raymond
1936	Swing Time	Fred Astaire and Ginger Rogers
1936	Walking on Air	Gene Raymond, Ann Sothern
1936	Adventure in Manhattan	Jean Arthur, Joel McCrea
1936	Smartest Girl in Town	Gene Raymond, Ann Sothern
1936	Theodora Goes Wild	Irene Dunne, Melvyn Douglas
1936	More Than a Secretary	Jean Arthur, George Brent
1936	History Is Made at Night	Jean Arthur, Charles Boyer
1937	When You're In Love	Cary Grant, Grace Moore
1937	Vivacious Lady	Ginger Rogers, Jimmy Stewart
1938	You Can't Take It with You	Jean Arthur, Jimmy Stewart, Lionel Barrymore
1939	Green Hell	Douglas Fairbanks Jr., Joan Bennett
1942	Tales of Manhattan	
1946	Deception	Bette Davis, Paul Henreid
1946	Humoresque	Joan Crawford, John Garfield
1947	Possessed	Joan Crawford, Van Heflin
1947	Deep Valley	Ida Lupino, Dane Clark
1947	Dark Passage	Humphrey Bogart, Lauren Bacall
1947	Escape Me Never	Errol Flynn, Ida Lupino
1948	Hazard	Paulette Goddard, Macdonald Carey
1948	The Woman in White	Eleanor Parker, Alexis Smith
