= Smartest Girl in Town =

1936 film by Joseph Santley

- Theatrical release poster
- Directed by: Joseph Santley
- Screenplay by: Viola Brothers Shore
- Story by: Muriel Scheck; H. S. Kraft
- Produced by: Edward Kaufman
- Starring: Gene Raymond; Ann Sothern
- Cinematography: J. Roy Hunt, A.S.C.
- Edited by: Jack Hively
- Music by: No credit listed. Musical director Nathaniel Shilkret
- Production company: RKO Radio Pictures, Inc.
- Distributed by: RKO Radio Pictures, Inc.
- Release date: November 27, 1936
- Running time: 58 minutes
- Country: United States
- Language: English

Smartest Girl in Town is a 1936 American comedy film directed by Joseph Santley, written by Viola Brothers Shore, and starring Gene Raymond, Ann Sothern, Helen Broderick, Eric Blore, Erik Rhodes and Harry Jans. It was released on November 27, 1936, by RKO Pictures.

== Plot ==
Model "Cookie" Cooke (Ann Sothern) is urged by her unsatisfactorily married practical older sister Gwen (Helen Broderick) to find a wealthy husband. On a modeling assignment she runs into millionaire Dick Smith (Gene Raymond), but assumes him to be a low-earning male model. Dick falls in love with her, but she insists on dating eccentrically mannered Italian aristocrat Baron Enrico (Erik Rhodes). Dick installs another mannered character, his valet Philbean (Eric Blore) in the position of a casting agency president who would then pair Cookie on the same pre-arranged modeling jobs with Dick. Ultimately, Baron Enrico, who is so obsessed with birds that he cannot concentrate on romance long enough to propose, is goaded by Gwen into presenting Cookie with an engagement ring. Forced to act fast, Dick pretends to have attempted suicide by a gunshot to the head and asks Cookie to marry him on his deathbed, but she tastes the "ketchup blood" on his face and then embraces him.

== Cast ==
- Gene Raymond as Richard Stuyvesant "Dick" Smith
- Ann Sothern as Frances "Cookie" Cooke
- Helen Broderick as Mrs. Gwen Mayen, Cookie's sister
- Eric Blore as Lucius Philbean, Dick's valet
- Erik Rhodes as Baron Enrico Torene
- Harry Jans as Terry, Gwen's perennially unemployed estranged husband

== Casting notes ==
RKO Pictures was also the studio which produced the Fred Astaire-Ginger Rogers series of films, thus Smartest Girl's comic supporting players, Helen Broderick, Eric Blore and Erik Rhodes, all had prominent roles in the previous year's Astaire-Rogers hit, Top Hat. Furthermore, two months before Smartest Girl's release, Blore and Broderick were seen in the dancing duo's very successful 1936 effort, Swing Time and, the previous year, had been in another RKO musical comedy, To Beat the Band. As for Blore and Rhodes, both had earlier appeared in the first Astaire-Rogers vehicle, 1934's The Gay Divorcee and also interacted as comedy relief in two other RKOs, the 1935 musical Old Man Rhythm and the 1936 murder mystery Two in the Dark.

One additional Astaire-Rogers title for RKO, the pair's initial teaming as supporting players in 1933's Flying Down to Rio, starred Gene Raymond (with leading lady Dolores del Río) and included Eric Blore as the typically mannered assistant hotel manager, Mr. Butterbass. Blore also supported Raymond in two other films, the 1934 Paramount drama Behold My Wife! (minor role as Benson, the butler) and the 1935 RKO mystery-comedy Seven Keys to Baldpate (third-billed, after co-star Margaret Callahan, in the key role of Harrison who masqueraded as Professor Bolton). The same year, Blore sported a French accent playing a major, fourth-billed role, in the musical comedy Folies Bergère de Paris, with top-tier stars Maurice Chevalier, Merle Oberon and Smartest Girl's Ann Sothern.

The last of the five 1935–37 RKO vehicles for Gene Raymond and Ann Sothern was She's Got Everything, with third-billed Victor Moore and fourth-billed Helen Broderick. In addition to the two films with Raymond and Sothern, Broderick also supported Raymond in three other RKO romantic comedies, 1936's Love on a Bet (third-billed, after co-star Wendy Barrie) and The Bride Walks Out (fifth-billed, after the other two leads, Barbara Stanwyck and Robert Young and supporting player Ned Sparks) as well as 1937's The Life of the Party, a Joe Penner vehicle, with Raymond as co-star and, for comedy support, Parkyakarkus, Harriet Hilliard, Victor Moore and Broderick. It was the third of six RKO films in which was teamed with Victor Moore. In addition to the Astaire-Rogers Swing Time and the Raymond-Sothern She's Got Everything, they were given two 1937 B-picture starring vehicles, We're on the Jury and Meet the Missus, as well as roles among the numerous players in the following year's Bob "Bazooka" Burns–Jack Oakie-Kenny Baker musical comedy, Radio City Revels.
