= That's My Daddy =

1928 film

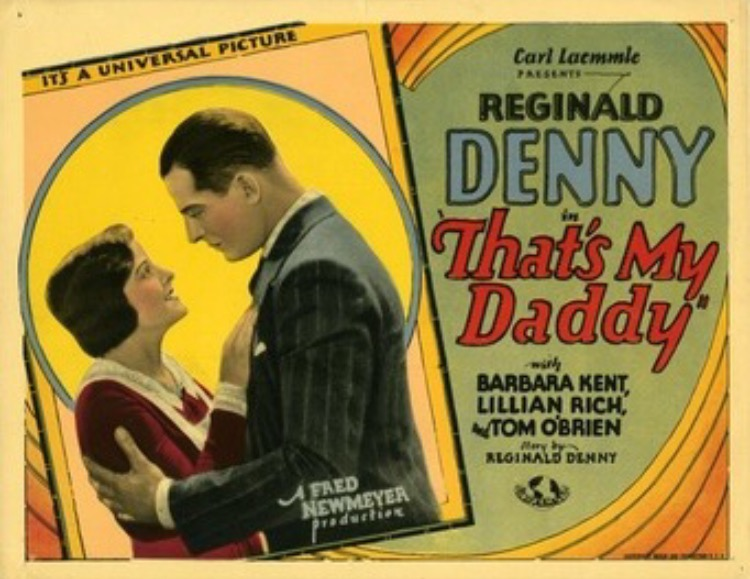
- Lobby card
- Directed by: Fred C. Newmeyer
- Written by: Reginald Denny (story); Pierre Couderc; Albert DeMond; Earle Snell; Faith Thomas
- Starring: Reginald Denny; Barbara Kent; Lillian Rich; Jane La Verne; Rosa Gore; Mathilde Brundage; Armand Kaliz; Wilson Benge
- Cinematography: Arthur L. Todd
- Production company: Universal Pictures
- Distributed by: Universal Pictures
- Release date: February 5, 1928
- Running time: 6,073 feet (6 reels)
- Country: United States
- Language: Silent (English intertitles)

That's My Daddy is a 1928 American silent comedy film starring Reginald Denny and Barbara Kent. The film's story is credited to Denny; though the direction is credited to Fred C. Newmeyer, Denny claimed to have directed most of the film himself. The film survives and has been preserved by the UCLA Film & Television Archive.

== Preservation ==
After being unavailable to the public for many decades, the film was screened at the Stanford Theatre in Palo Alto, California, on August 24, 2007 (on a double bill with Denny's 1925 film I'll Show You the Town), and again on August 13, 2014. In both cases, the films were introduced and accompanied by the organist Dennis James. A double bill of That's My Daddy and I'll Show You the Town was again run at the Stanford on June 9, 2025, to honor the theatre's hundredth year of operation; Denny's granddaughter, Kimberly Pucci, was in attendance.
