= The Rage of Paris =

1938 film by Henry Koster

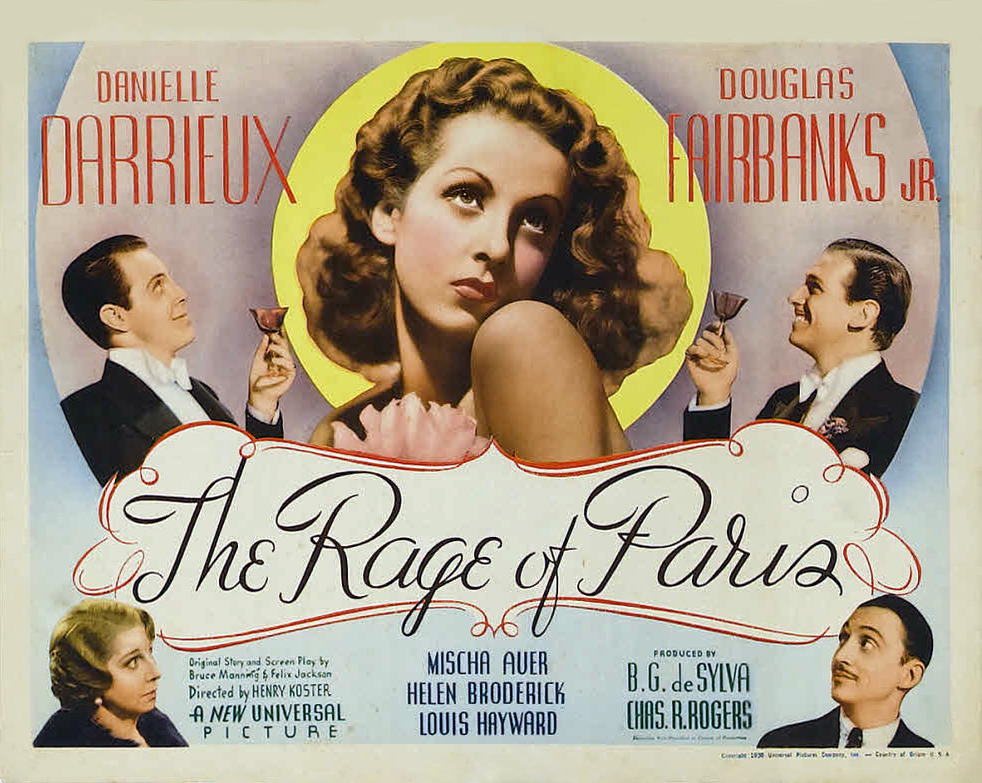
- Directed by: Henry Koster
- Written by: Bruce Manning; Felix Jackson
- Story by: Bruce Manning; Felix Jackson
- Produced by: Buddy G. DeSylva; Henry Koster (uncredited)
- Starring: Danielle Darrieux; Douglas Fairbanks Jr. Mischa Auer; Louis Hayward; Helen Broderick; Charles Coleman
- Cinematography: Joseph A. Valentine
- Edited by: Bernard W. Burton
- Music by: uncredited: Frank Skinner; Hans J. Salter; Charles Previn; Charles Henderson
- Production company: Universal Pictures
- Distributed by: Universal Pictures
- Release date: July 1, 1938
- Running time: 78 minutes
- Country: United States
- Language: English
- Budget: $960,000

The Rage of Paris is a 1938 American comedy film made by Universal Pictures. The movie was directed by Henry Koster, and written by Bruce Manning and Felix Jackson. It won the Venice Film Festival for Special Recommendation. It was re-issued by Realart in 1951 under the title Confessions of a Model.

== Plot ==
In New York City, Frenchwoman Nicole de Cortillon seeks modeling work and manages to steal a name and address from a modeling agency by lying about her qualifications, but it is the wrong information. She starts undressing in the advertising office of a very puzzled Jim Trevor. When she finally realizes he is not a photographer, she storms out.

Nicole is locked out of her room by her landlady for being behind on her rent, but her friend Gloria helps her out by paying the arrears. Gloria suggests she try to snare a rich husband. Gloria is good friends with Mike, the head waiter at the ritzy Savoy Grand Hotel, so she tries to get him to hire Nicole. Mike has no openings, but mentions that he has saved $3000 to open a restaurant. He needs another $2000, so Gloria convinces him to finance a scheme to have Nicole attract the attention of Bill Duncan, a regular hotel guest who "owns half of Canada". Nicole and Gloria settle into a suite across the hall from Bill's.

The plan hits a snag when Bill's good friend Jim Trevor recognizes her. Jim demands she tell Bill the truth. She agrees, but reneges. When Jim tells Bill, Bill does not believe him, as they have both lied before to steal each other's girlfriends. Jim blackmails Nicole into dining with him and gets her to confess that she needs $3000 in front of his butler Rigley. He departs to inform Bill, but she escapes Rigley's custody and gets to Bill first. When Bill introduces Nicole to his family, Jim brings Rigley to the reception, but Bill remains unconvinced and punches Jim in the jaw. Ashamed, Nicole follows after Jim and offers to confess all, but he does not believe her. She gets into Jim's car to see if he has been injured. He then drives off with her, taking her to his isolated country retreat, where his caretaker mistakes her for his new wife.

That night, Nicole confesses to Jim that she has fallen in love with him, but he only asks her when she found out he is richer than Bill. She slips out and hitches a ride back to New York.

Bill finally discovers the truth and becomes worried about a breach of promise lawsuit. Mike promises to get Nicole to leave the country ... in exchange for his money back ($5000). Nicole boards a ship bound for France. There she finds Jim, who is arranging for the captain to marry them.

== Cast ==
- Danielle Darrieux as Nicole
- Douglas Fairbanks Jr. as Jim Trevor
- Mischa Auer as Mike
- Louis Hayward as Bill Duncan
- Helen Broderick as Gloria
- Charles Coleman as Rigley
- Samuel S. Hinds as Mr. Duncan
- Nella Walker as Mrs. Duncan
- Harry Davenport as Caretaker

== Adaptation ==
A 60-minute radio adaptation (retitled The Rage of Manhattan) was aired on the November 18, 1940 broadcast of Lux Radio Theatre. Tyrone Power and his wife Annabella assumed the lead roles of Jim Trevor and Nicole.
