= Solly Ward =

American actor

- Ward ca. 1919
- Born: October 11, 1890; New York City, New York, U.S.
- Died: May 17, 1942 (aged 51); Hollywood, Los Angeles, California, U.S.
- Occupations: Actor, comedian
- Years active: 1929–1941

Solly Ward (October 11, 1890 – May 17, 1942) was an American actor and comedian. He appeared in the films Flight from Glory, Living on Love, Danger Patrol, She's Got Everything, Everybody's Doing It, Maid's Night Out, This Marriage Business, Blind Alibi, Smashing the Rackets, Conspiracy, Sued for Libel and Footlight Fever.

He died on May 17, 1942, in Hollywood, Los Angeles, California at age 51.
