= Love on a Bet =

1936 film directed by Leigh Jason

- Directed by: Leigh Jason
- Screenplay by: P. J. Wolfson; Philip G. Epstein
- Story by: Kenneth Earl
- Produced by: B. B. Kahane; Lee Marcus (associate)
- Starring: Gene Raymond; Wendy Barrie; Helen Broderick
- Cinematography: Robert de Grasse
- Edited by: Desmond Marquette
- Music by: Alberto Colombo
- Production company: RKO Radio Pictures
- Distributed by: RKO Radio Pictures
- Release dates: March 4, 1936 (Premiere-New York City); March 6, 1936 (US)
- Running time: 77 minutes
- Country: United States
- Language: English

Love on a Bet is a 1936 American romantic comedy film directed by Leigh Jason using a screenplay by P. J. Wolfson and Philip G. Epstein, based on a story by Kenneth Earl. The film stars Gene Raymond, Wendy Barrie, and Helen Broderick, and was released by RKO Radio Pictures on February 1, 1936.

== Plot ==
Michael McCreigh needs $15,000 to finance a new play. He proposes an outrageous wager with his rich Uncle Carlton that he can leave New York City without clothes or money and make it to Los Angeles in 10 days, and arrive there in a new suit, with $100, and a new girl. If not, he will quit the theater and go into his uncle's meatpacking business.

Dropped off from a limousine in only his undergarments at Central Park, Michael encounters Paula Gilbert and her beau Jackson Wallace, promptly stealing his tux. He then swapped the formal wear for a World War I soldier's outfit and by coincidence is picked up by Paula and her Aunt Charlotte while hitchhiking.

The two women, members of New York City, social register down in their fortunes, are en route to Los Angeles, where Paula intends to marry Wallace simply for his money, leaving immediately with him for two years in China.

To the consternation of her aunt, who is counting on Paula's financial security, Paula begins to fall for Michael. His various schemes earn him money on the way west, but after two escaped convicts rob them, Paula becomes aware of Michael's bet and is disappointed in him. He manages to get to L.A. just in time, with reward money for capturing the fugitives, and Paula forgives him. Then she demands that he go into his uncle's meatpacking trade after all.

== Cast ==
- Gene Raymond as Michael
- Wendy Barrie as Paula
- Helen Broderick as Aunt Charlotte
- William Collier, Sr. as Uncle Carlton
- Spencer Charters as Plaza Ritz Hotel Owner
- Walter Johnson as Stephen Dody
- Jack Randall as Jackson
- Eddie Gribbon as Donovan, Escaped Convict
- Morgan Wallace as Morton, Escaped Convict
- William B. Davidson as A.W. Hutchinson
- Minerva Urecal as Miss Jones, MacCreigh's Secretary
- Lloyd Ingraham as Bertram
- Billy Gilbert as New York Policeman
- Lynton Brent as Reporter
- Maxine Jennings as Telephone Operator
- Irving Bacon as Farmer on Hay Wagon
