= Silks and Saddles (1929 film) =

1929 film

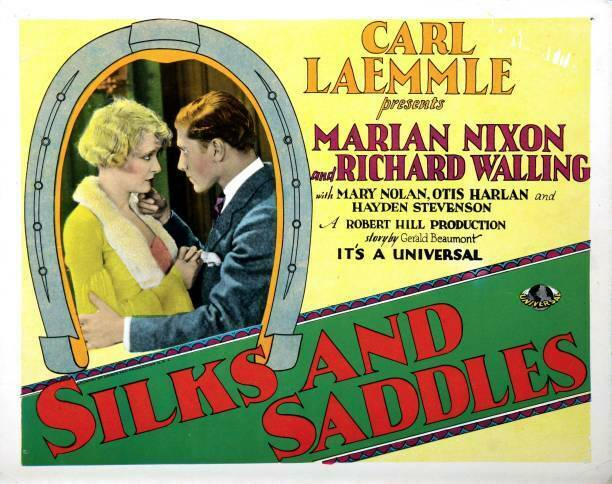
- Directed by: Robert F. Hill
- Screenplay by: Edward Clark; James Gruen; Paul Gangelin; Faith Thomas; J.G. Hawks; Albert DeMond
- Story by: Gerald Beaumont
- Starring: Richard Walling; Marian Nixon; Sam De Grasse; Montagu Love; Mary Nolan; Otis Harlan
- Cinematography: Joseph Brotherton
- Edited by: Daniel Mandell
- Production company: Universal Pictures
- Distributed by: Universal Pictures
- Release date: January 20, 1929
- Running time: 60 minutes
- Country: United States
- Language: English

Silks and Saddles is a 1929 American pre-Code drama film directed by Robert F. Hill and written by Edward Clark, James Gruen, Paul Gangelin, Faith Thomas, J.G. Hawks and Albert DeMond. The film stars Richard Walling, Marian Nixon, Sam De Grasse, Montagu Love, Mary Nolan and Otis Harlan. The film was released on January 20, 1929, by Universal Pictures.

== Cast ==
- Richard Walling as Johnny Spencer
- Marian Nixon as Lucy Calhoun
- Sam De Grasse as William Morrissey
- Montagu Love as Walter Sinclair
- Mary Nolan as Sybil Morrissey
- Otis Harlan as Jimmy McKee
- David Torrence as Judge Clifford
- Claire McDowell as Mrs. Calhoun
- Johnny Fox as Ellis
- Hayden Stevenson as Trainer

== Preservation ==
The film is preserved at UCLA Film and Television Archive.
