= Trouble Chasers =

1945 film by Lew Landers

- Directed by: Lew Landers
- Written by: George H. Plympton; Ande Lamb
- Produced by: Sam Katzman; Jack Dietz
- Starring: Billy Gilbert; Maxie Rosenbloom; Shemp Howard
- Cinematography: Marcel Le Picard
- Edited by: Richard C. Currier
- Production company: Sam Katzman Productions
- Distributed by: Monogram Pictures
- Release date: May 2, 1945
- Running time: 63 minutes
- Country: United States
- Language: English

Trouble Chasers is a 1945 American comedy film directed by Lew Landers and starring Billy Gilbert, Maxie Rosenbloom and Shemp Howard.

== Plot ==
A valuable necklace is stolen, and a couple of gangsters think that 3 inept stooges know where it is.

== Cast ==
- Billy Gilbert as Billy
- Maxie Rosenbloom as Maxie
- Shemp Howard as Shemp Howard
- Gloria Marlen as Nora Nolan
- Carlyle Blackwell Jr. as Tommy Young
- Barbara Pepper as Goldie
- I. Stanford Jolley as Lefty Reed
- Wheeler Oakman as Dek Sharp
- Patsy Moran as Mrs. Tubbs
- Budd Buster as Mr. X
- Emmett Lynn as Mr. Fuddy
- Milton Kibbee as H. G. Hogan
