= Conspiracy (1939 film) =

1939 American spy drama film directed by Lew Landers

- Theatrical poster for the film
- Directed by: Lew Landers
- Screenplay by: Jerome Chodorov
- Story by: John P. McCarthy; Faith Thomas
- Produced by: Cliff Reid
- Starring: Allan Lane; Linda Hayes; Robert Barrat
- Cinematography: Frank Redman
- Edited by: George Hively
- Music by: Frank Tours (director); Roy Webb (score)
- Production company: RKO Radio Pictures
- Release dates: August 23, 1939 (Premiere-New York City); September 1, 1939 (US)
- Running time: 59 minutes
- Country: United States
- Language: English

Conspiracy is a 1939 American spy drama film directed by Lew Landers, from a screenplay by Jerome Chodorov, based on the story, "Salute to Hate", by John McCarthy and Faith Thomas. The film stars Allan Lane, Linda Hayes, and Robert Barrat, and was produced and distributed by RKO Radio Pictures, who premiered the film in New York City on August 23, 1939, with a general release on September 1.

== Plot ==
Steve Kendall is an American working as a telegraph operator aboard a cargo ship. He inadvertently discovers that his ship is carrying contraband arms, when a revolutionary agent forces him to send a message to his fellow revolutionaries ashore. The secret police catch the two together and the revolutionary is shot dead as he attempts to jump overboard. Having seen the two of them together, the police mistakenly believe Kendall to be in league with the local revolutionaries. As they near port, Kendall dives overboard and swims ashore. Being chased by the militia and police, he winds up meeting a local member of the revolutionary party, Nedra who was also the sister of the dead revolutionary. Prior to her brother's death, Neadra's group had been planning to hijack the illegal arms on Kendall's ship. Nedra introduces Kendall to Tio, an American expatriate who runs a local dance hall. Tio agrees to hide him in the basement of the hall, while Nedra tries to figure a way to smuggle Kendall out of the country.

Eventually Nedra arranges transport for Kendall on a steamship heading north. Before he can make good his escape, the police descend on Tio's, forcing not only Kendall to flee, but Tio and his friend, Studs, as well. The police chase them via speedboat, heading them off at the steamship. The group heads back to land, where Tio radios a call for help. After a gunfight, the foursome escape via seaplane to the United States, where, after they arrive, Nedra tearfully lets them know that she has to go back and help her comrades in their fight for freedom.

== Cast ==
- Allan Lane as Steve Kendall
- Linda Hayes as Nedra
- Robert Barrat as Tio
- Charley Foy as Studs
- Lionel Royce as Lieutenant
- J. Farrell MacDonald as Captain
- Lester Matthews as Gair
- Henry Brandon as Carlson
- William Von Brincken as Wilson
- Solly Ward as Dr. Fromm
- John Laing as Inspector Orderly
- Dwight Frye as Lieutenant Keller
- John Laird as Radio operator
- Al Herman as Bartender
- Fred Rapport as Walter

(cast list as per AFI database)

== Production ==
In March 1939, RKO purchased the story, Salute to Hate by Faith Thomas. It was originally meant to star Anne Wilson and John McCarthy. In April, RKO made the decision to change the name of the film from Salute to Hate to Conspiracy. In June it was announced that Allan Lane and Linda Hayes would be headlining the picture, with Lew Landers handling the directing reins, and Cliff Reid the producing chores. It was Hayes first starring role; she had been discovered when she won the 1938 Gateway to Hollywood contest, a nationwide talent search sponsored by producer Jesse Lasky. The film was in production by the end of June, 1939, and had wrapped filming by July 14. It was announced that Robert Barrat, Charley Foy, J. Farrell MacDonald, Lionel Royce, Lester Matthews, and Solly Ward were also in the cast. with a general opening nationwide on September 1. The film premiered at the Rialto Theater in New York City on August 23, 1939, with a general opening nationwide on September 1. The signs in the film are in Esperanto, and a few lines of dialogue also are in Esperanto.

Prior to its opening, the Motion Picture Herald wrote that it would be a socially significant film, casting light on the practices of the secret police organizations in countries controlled by dictators. In August, Conspiracy was given a class A-1 rating by the National Legion of Decency, labeling it unobjectionable for general audiences.

== Reception ==
The Film Daily gave the film a mixed review. They felt the plot was confusing and muddled, but enjoyed the action and pacing. They also highlighted the acting abilities of Allan Lane and Linda Hayes. Harrison's Reports was somewhat more positive. While they did have an issue with the believability of the plot, they felt that was overshadowed by the action and the pacing. The Motion Picture Herald was not kind to the picture, which called the confusing plot "disastrous". They also said that the production and direction, by Reid and Landers respectively, "may have had in mind all the serials ever produced", leading to such confusion among the audience viewers that there was no hope of recovery.
