= Watch Your Wife =

1926 film

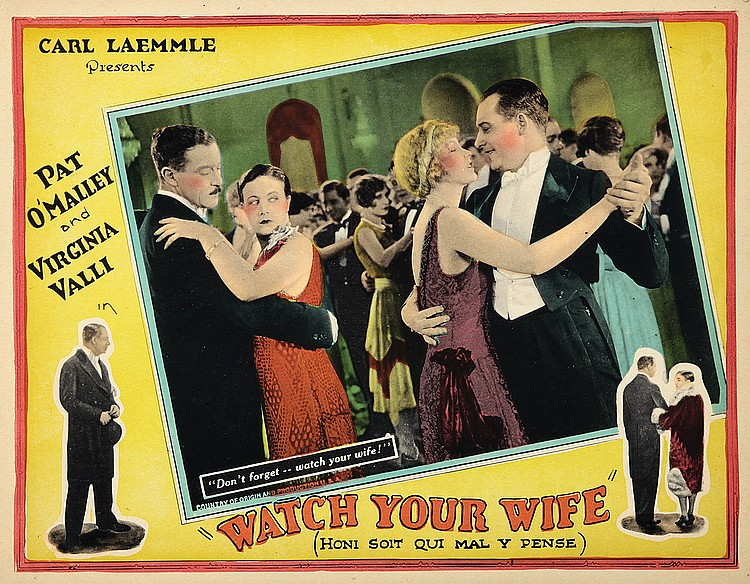
- Directed by: Svend Gade
- Written by: Svend GadeCharles E. Whittaker
- Based on: "Watch Your Wife" by Gösta Segercrantz
- Produced by: Victor Noerdlinger
- Starring: Virginia Valli; Pat O'Malley; Nat Carr
- Cinematography: Arthur L. Todd
- Production company: Universal Pictures
- Distributed by: Universal Pictures
- Release date: April 4, 1926
- Running time: 72 minutes
- Country: United States
- Languages: Silent; English intertitles

Watch Your Wife is a 1926 American silent comedy-drama film directed by Svend Gade and starring Virginia Valli, Pat O'Malley, and Nat Carr. A print of Watch Your Wife exists.

== Plot ==
As described in a film magazine review, James Langham and his wife Claudia are divorced, and Count Alphonse Marsac woos Claudia. James hires Gladys Moon from an agency that advertises "wives for rent," but really provides housekeepers for hire, with working hours being from 8 a.m. to 8 p.m. A storm forces Gladys to remain overnight at the James house. Claudia, repenting of the minor squabbles that caused their divorce, shows up the next morning, but flees at the sight of Gladys. James follows her and gets her off a train on which she was about to leave with Marsac. The couple become reconciled.

== Cast ==
- Virginia Valli as Claudia Langham
- Pat O'Malley as James Langham
- Nat Carr as Benjamin Harris
- Helen Lee Worthing as Gladys Moon
- Albert Conti as Alphonse Marsac
- Aggie Herring as Madame Buff
- Nora Hayden as Maid
- Gary Cooper as Extra

== Bibliography ==
- Langman, Larry. Destination Hollywood: The Influence of Europeans on American Filmmaking. McFarland, 2000.
