= History Is Made at Night (1937 film) =

1937 film by Frank Borzage

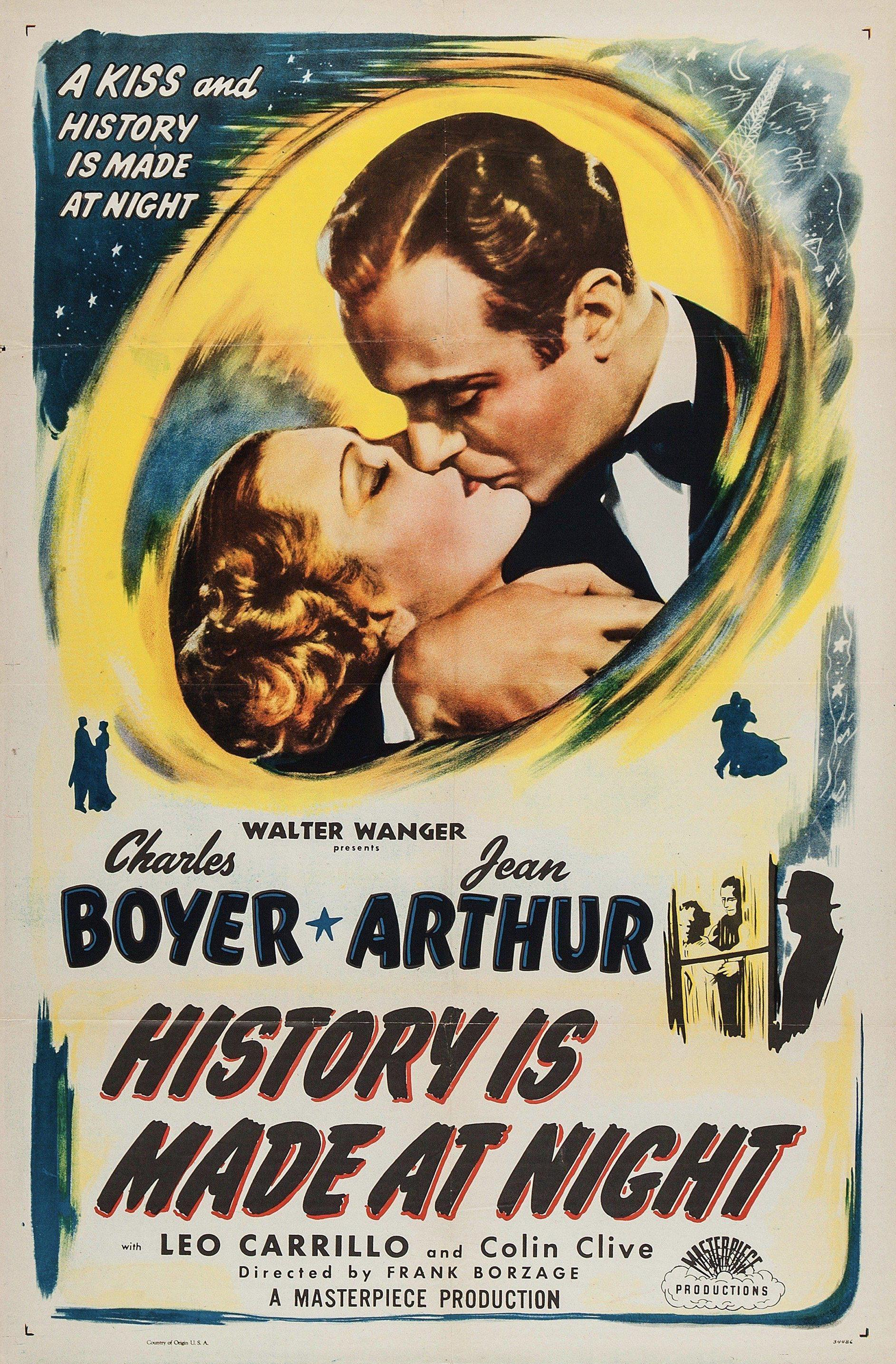
- Theatrical release poster
- Directed by: Frank Borzage
- Written by: C. Graham Baker
- Screenplay by: Gene Towne; Vincent Lawrence; David Hertz
- Produced by: Walter Wanger
- Starring: Charles Boyer; Jean Arthur; Leo Carrillo; Colin Clive
- Cinematography: David Abel
- Edited by: Margaret Clancey
- Music by: Alfred Newman
- Production company: Walter Wanger Productions
- Distributed by: United Artists
- Release date: March 26, 1937
- Running time: 95 minutes
- Country: United States
- Language: English
- Budget: $821,791
- Box office: $948,500

History Is Made at Night is a 1937 American romantic comedy drama film directed by Frank Borzage and starring Jean Arthur, Charles Boyer, and Colin Clive. It follows an American woman who falls in love with a waiter in Paris, only for her wealthy husband to stage a series of events and crimes to prevent the two from uniting. The film has been noted for its blending of genres, including comedy, drama and romance, as well as its inclusion of elements of suspense and disaster films, specifically in its final act.

Produced by Walter Wanger and filmed in late 1936 and early 1937, History Is Made at Night was released in the United States on March 26, 1937, by United Artists.

== Plot ==
Irene Vail decides to divorce her husband, the rich ship owner Bruce Vail. However, Bruce learns that he can prevent the divorce if he can provide evidence that she has been involved with another man. He pays his driver Michael to visit Irene's hotel room in Paris and pretend to be her lover so that a private detective can catch them in a compromising position. However, a man overhears Irene's startled cry upon finding Michael in her room, and a struggle ensues when the man defends Irene, leaving Michael on the floor, unconscious. When Bruce and the detective burst into the room, the man threatens them with a gun, demands Irene's jewelry and takes Irene hostage.

Once they are away, the intruder, Paul Dumond, returns Irene's jewelry and invites her to dine with him at the Château Bleu restaurant, where he works as a waiter. They dance and Irene falls in love with him. In the morning, Irene returns to find Bruce and the police in her room, as Michael is dead. Bruce leads her to believe that Paul is responsible for the murder and blackmails her into coming back to the United States with him in exchange for Paul's freedom. Distraught that he is unable to find Irene, Paul learns that Irene has reunited with her husband and left for the United States. Sensing something is wrong, he embarks on a trip to find her, accompanied by Cesare, his good friend and head chef of Château Bleu.

In Manhattan, Paul and Cesare rehabilitate a restaurant, hoping that it will attract Irene. The reunion takes place at last, but Paul learns that Michael is dead and that a man has been arrested in Paris for the murder. Unwilling to let an innocent man pay for what he thinks is his crime, Paul embarks for Paris, and Irene joins him. They travel on the liner Princess Irene, which is owned by Bruce and named after her.

Bruce learns that they are on the ship. In a rage, he orders the captain to travel at full speed, despite the danger of collision with an iceberg, claiming a desire to break the record for fastest crossing. Bruce actually hopes that the ship will sink, killing Paul and Irene. The ship does strike an iceberg, and premature news reports state that the ship has sunk with tremendous loss of life. Consumed by guilt, Bruce commits suicide and confesses to killing Michael in a note. However, the ship's bulkhead doors contain the water and prevent the ship from sinking. Paul, Irene and the other passengers rejoice when they hear that they are to be rescued.

== Cast ==
- Charles Boyer as Paul Dumond
- Jean Arthur as Irene Vail
- Leo Carrillo as Cesare
- Colin Clive as Bruce Vail
- Ivan Lebedeff as Michael, Vail's Chauffeur
- George Meeker as Mr. Norton
- Lucien Prival as Private Detective
- George Davis as Maestro
- Pierre Watkin as Commodore Eldridge
- Byron Foulger as Vail Employee Reading from Newspaper
- Tom Ricketts as Old Man Getting in Lifeboat
- Señor Wences as "Coco" Hand Trick Performer

== Production ==
=== Development ===
Director Frank Borzage's attachment to the project was announced in July 1936. Independent producer Walter Wanger proposed the project to Borzage, at which time only two pages of its screenplay had been completed. However, Borzage agreed as he found the film's title compelling.

In the fall of 1936, a team of writers made up of Gene Towne, Vincent Lawrence, and David Hertz began "feverishly" attempting to complete the screenplay before the impending scheduled production date. However, the screenplay remained incomplete by the deadline, resulting in the writers continuing to complete scenes after shooting had commenced.

=== Filming ===
Principal photography began on November 4, 1936 and was scheduled to be completed on December 31, 1936. However, the shooting of the film's final dramatic ship disaster sequence—an unplanned addition to the story—prolonged the production until February 9, 1937. Over 500 extras were hired for the filming of this sequence. Borzage directed the extras to act as naturalistic as possible during the disaster sequence, instructing: "Don't all of you scream and act as if you are hysterical. No doubt some of you are not of the screaming type. React as naturally as you can. Here's a chance to show how you can act."

Overall, the film was shot across a total of eight film sets at Samuel Goldwyn Studios, with additional filming taking place at the neighboring Educational Pictures studio. An elaborate gown worn by Arthur's character early in the film, designed by Bernard Newman, weighed approximately 30 pounds (14 kg).

== Release ==
History Is Made at Night was released in Pennsylvania and Delaware on March 26, 1937, and premiered the following day in New York City on March 27. In Los Angeles, the film opened at Grauman's Chinese Theatre and Loew's State Theatre on April 7, 1937.

=== Home media ===
History Is Made at Night was released on VHS by Vestron Video's Lightning Video sublabel in 1985 and by Warner Home Video in 1993. The film was previously never released officially on DVD yet until it was released on Blu-ray and DVD by the Criterion Collection on April 13, 2021.

== Reception ==
=== Box office ===
The film was not a major box office success, grossing $948,500 and turning a profit of $17,450.

=== Critical response ===
History Is Made at Night was met with a mixed response during its premiere, resulting from what Borzage biographer Hervé Dumont describes as a "disconcerting mixture of genres and changes in direction." In a contemporary review for The New York Times, critic Frank S. Nugent called the film "as unreasonably likeable a film as we have chuckled over and snorted at this season" and wrote:

[E]ven a cursory inspection shows that this romance ... contains more false premises than a Bowery voting list and unconcernedly develops them in whatever style happened to occur to the writers at the moment. As a literary exercise, it is nothing short of multidexterous [sic]: farce with one hand, melodrama with the next, comedy with a third, tragedy a fourth. We have no idea what the average would be. Only an extremely clever cast could have kept the story within credible limits. And that is the picture's saving virtue; it has an ingratiating group of players, each carrying out his assignment to the letter.

Reviewer Philip K. Scheuer of the Los Angeles Times wrote: "It gets better playing than it deserves. You grow interested, darn it, in Boyer and Miss Arthur; they look genuine and perform slickly; they lend 'class.'"

Critic Dave Kehr regards the film as one of Borzage's "warmest, most perfect works."

== Sources ==
- Bernstein, Matthew (1994). Walter Wanger, Hollywood Independent. Minneapolis, Minnesota: University of Minnesota Press. ISBN 978-0-8166-9142-5. OCLC 476096270.
- Dumont, Hervé (2009). Frank Borzage: The Life and Films of a Hollywood Romantic. Jefferson, North Carolina: McFarland & Company. ISBN 978-0-786-44098-6.
