= Billy Gilbert =

American comedian and actor (1894–1971)

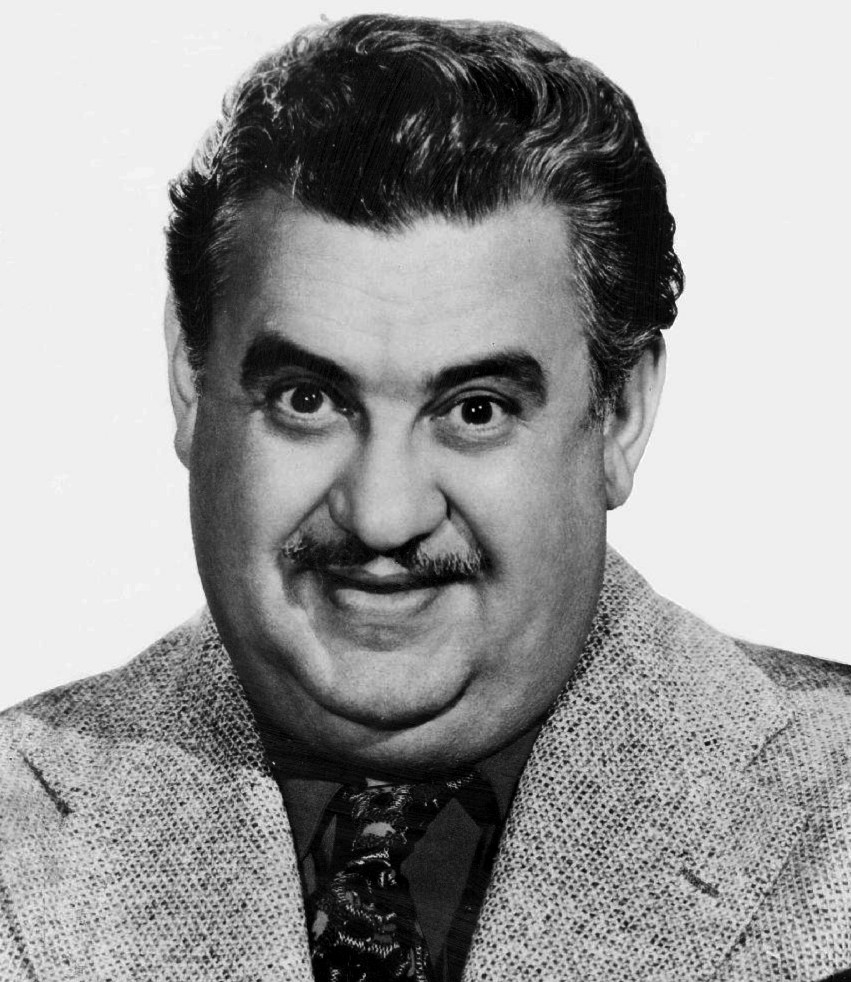
- Gilbert in 1954
- Born: William Gilbert Barron; September 12, 1894; Louisville, Kentucky, U.S.
- Died: September 23, 1971 (aged 77); Los Angeles, California, U.S.
- Occupations: Actor; comedian; director; writer
- Years active: 1929–1962
- Spouse: Ella McKenzie (m. 1938)

William Gilbert Barron (September 12, 1894 – September 23, 1971), known professionally as Billy Gilbert, was an American actor and comedian. Leonard Maltin praised Gilbert in his Movie Encyclopedia: "One of the screen's most beloved character actors, Billy Gilbert is remembered for two particular talents: his skill as a dialectician and his ability to stretch a simple sneeze into a hilarious routine." He appeared in more than 200 feature films, short subjects, and television shows, beginning in 1929.

== Career ==
=== Early life and vaudeville career ===
The child of singers with the Metropolitan Opera, he was born on September 12, 1894, in a dressing room at the Hopkins Opera House in Louisville, Kentucky. As a child, he lived in San Francisco, and left school to join a troupe of singing children. His early work included a female-impersonation act and professional boxing. Gilbert began working in vaudeville at age 12, and performed in burlesque on the Columbia and Mutual circuits.

=== Entry into films ===
Gilbert made his first films for Pat Powers, an independent producer of silent films who wanted to enter the new field of talking pictures. Powers invested in inventor Lee de Forest's Phonofilm company and made an unsuccessful takeover bid. Powers soon hired a former de Forest technician, William Garity, to replicate the Phonofilm sound recording system, which became Powers Cinephone. Powers opened a Cinephone studio for sound-film production in June 1929, on 40th Avenue in Long Island City, New York. Among his first productions were comedy shorts with burlesque comedians Billy Gilbert and Gene Schuler. The physical plant was small for a movie studio; surviving Cinephone shorts restrict the camera movement to one cramped soundstage.

Gilbert joined a stage revue, Sensations of 1929. Comedian Stan Laurel, then working for comedy producer Hal Roach, was in the audience at one performance (probably in London, where the show was playing in August 1929 during the Roach studio's summer layoff). Laurel went backstage to meet Gilbert and was so impressed that he introduced Gilbert to Roach. Gilbert worked for Roach as a gag writer, actor, and director.

Gilbert also established himself at the Vitaphone studio in 1930 – he appears without billing in the Joe Frisco comedy The Happy Hottentots (restored and released on DVD). Gilbert's burly frame and gruff voice made him a good comic villain, and within the year he was working consistently for Roach studios. He appeared in support of Roach's comedy stars Laurel and Hardy, Charley Chase, Thelma Todd, and Our Gang. He was featured in the Academy Award-winning Laurel and Hardy featurette The Music Box (1932). Gilbert generally played blustery tough guys in the Roach comedies, but could portray other comic characters, from fey couturiers to pompous radio announcers to roaring drunks. Gilbert's skill at dialects prompted Roach to give him his own series: big Billy Gilbert teamed with little Billy Bletcher as the Dutch-comic "Schmaltz Brothers." The best known of these offbeat musical-comedy shorts is Rhapsody in Brew (which Gilbert also directed). Gilbert regularly starred in Roach's short-comedy series The Taxi Boys, opposite comedians Clyde Cook, Billy Bevan, Franklin Pangborn, and Ben Blue.

Like many other Roach contractees, Gilbert found similar work at other studios. He appears in the early comedies of the Three Stooges at Columbia Pictures, as well as in RKO short subjects. These led to featured roles in full-length films, and from 1934 Gilbert became one of the screen's most familiar faces. In 1944, Billy signed with the prestigious William Morris Agency, which led to starring roles and prominent supporting roles in numerous films.

=== Feature films ===
One of his standard routines was introduced in burlesque and had become established in his act by 1929: Gilbert would progressively get excited or nervous about something, and his speech would break down into facial spasms, culminating in a big, loud sneeze. Gilbert did the sneeze routine in a memorable cameo in the Paramount comedy Million Dollar Legs (1932) starring W. C. Fields, Jack Oakie, Susan Fleming, and Ben Turpin. He used this bit so frequently that Walt Disney thought of him immediately when casting the voice of Sneezy in Snow White and the Seven Dwarfs (1937). Gilbert and Disney would later work together again in the "Mickey and the Beanstalk" sequence in Fun and Fancy Free (1947), with Gilbert voicing Willie the Giant in a similar "Sneezy" voice.

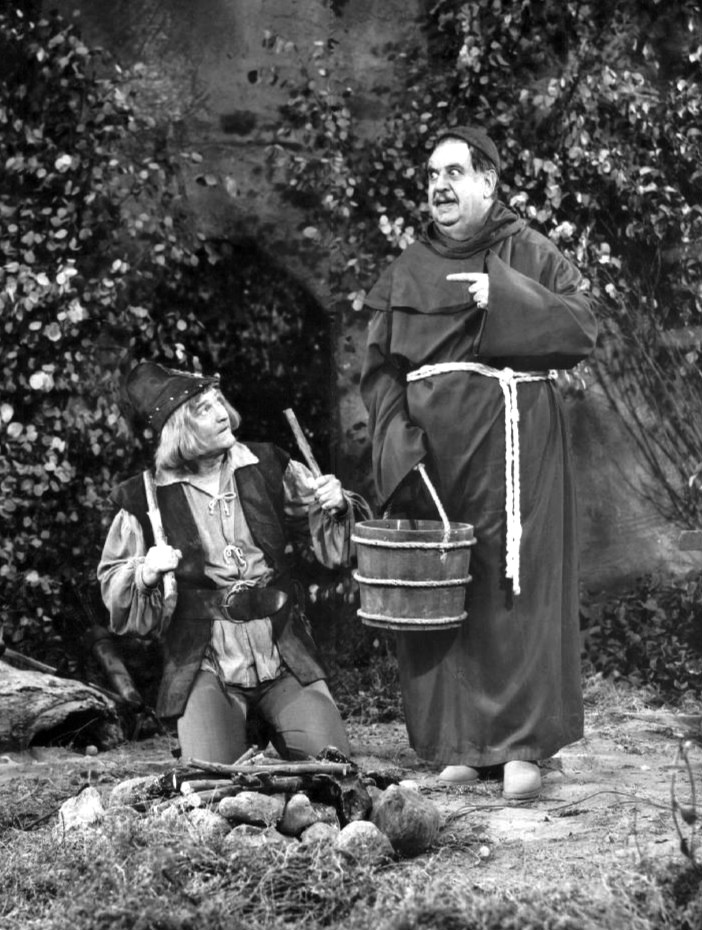
Gilbert as Friar Tuck and Red Skelton as Robin Hood on the Red Skelton Show 1956 sketch.

Gilbert is prominent in most of the movies he appeared in, and he often used dialects. He appeared as "Herring" – a parody of Nazi official Hermann Göring – the minister of war in Charlie Chaplin's The Great Dictator. He danced with Alice Faye and Betty Grable in Tin Pan Alley; he stole scenes as a befuddled process server in the fast-paced comedy His Girl Friday; playing an Italian character, he played opposite singer Gloria Jean in The Under-Pup and A Little Bit of Heaven. He served a soda to Freddie Bartholomew in Captains Courageous. He was featured in the John Wayne and Marlene Dietrich film Seven Sinners. All of these were choice Gilbert roles, and all filmed within a single year, demonstrating how prolific and talented he was.

Gilbert seldom starred in movies but did have occasional opportunities to play leads. In 1943, he headlined a brief series of two-reel comedies for Columbia Pictures. That same year, Monogram Pictures teamed him with the urbane stage comedian Frank Fay for a series of four feature-length comedies. Fay left the series after the first entry, Spotlight Scandals (1943). Gilbert asked his closest friend, vaudeville veteran Shemp Howard, to replace Fay in the remaining three comedies. Howard had been the original third member of the Three Stooges before leaving to pursue a solo career.

=== Later years ===
During the late 1940s and early 1950s, Gilbert worked on Broadway in several productions as an actor, writer and director. These include acting roles in Fanny, The Chocolate Soldier, and Gypsy Lady, and directing roles in The Red Mill and other plays. In the 1950s, Billy Gilbert worked frequently in television, including a memorable pantomime sketch with Buster Keaton on You Asked for It. He appeared regularly on the children's program Andy's Gang with Andy Devine, and starred as the giant in Jack and the Beanstalk (1956), with Celeste Holm, and Joel Grey as Jack, in a Producers' Showcase TV episode. He retired from the screen following his appearance in the feature Five Weeks in a Balloon (1962).

== Personal life ==
Gilbert married actress Ella McKenzie. She had appeared as an ingenue in short-subject comedies. Fellow film comedian Charley Chase was the best man. In 1941, Billy and Ella adopted an 11-year-old son, Barry, who died in a 1943 shooting accident.

Ella Baxter McKenzie was an Ulster-Scot whose grandfather John McKenzie was a prominent member of the Orange Order in Ballymena, County Antrim, Northern Ireland. Her father was Robert Baxter McKenzie, who always wore an orange flower on the Twelfth of July, Orangeman's Day in Northern Ireland, in remembrance of the family background and cultural heritage. Ella's sister was film actress Fay McKenzie. The family moved to America and settled in Oregon when he was nine years old. In late 1943, Gilbert appeared with Ella in a USO show, entertaining the US Marines stationed in Derry, Northern Ireland. Ella and Billy visited Ballymena in 1943; an account of their visit is reported in the Larne Times of December 9, 1943.

== Death ==
Gilbert died on September 23, 1971, in North Hollywood at the age of 77, after suffering a stroke. He is buried in the Odd Fellows Cemetery.

== Legacy ==
For his contributions to the motion picture industry, Gilbert has a star on the Hollywood Walk of Fame at 6263 Hollywood Boulevard.

== Selected filmography ==
- The Woman from Hell (1929) as Minor Role (uncredited)
- Noisy Neighbors (1929) as Third Son
- The Happy Hottentots (1930, short) as Stage Manager
- Sea Legs (1930) as Naval Officer (uncredited)
- First Aid (1931) as Jenkins
- Chinatown After Dark (1931) as Dooley
- Shiver My Timbers (1931 short) as Sea Captain
- The Music Box (1932 short) as Professor Theodore von Schwarzenhoffen (uncredited)
- The Chimp (1932 short) as The Landlord (uncredited)
- Million Dollar Legs (1932) as Secretary of the Interior (uncredited)
- Skyscraper Souls (1932) as Second Ticket Agent (uncredited)
- Blondie of the Follies (1932) as Kinskey's Friend (uncredited)
- Pack Up Your Troubles (1932) as Mr. Hathaway
- County Hospital (1932 short) as The Doctor
- The Taxi Boys - What Price Taxi (1932 short) as Cabbie
- The Taxi Boys - Strange Innertube (1932 short) as Cabbie
- The Taxi Boys - Hot Spot (1932 short) as Cabbie
- The Taxi Boys - Taxi for Two (1932 short) as Cabbie
- The Taxi Boys - Bring 'Em Back a Wife (1933 short) as Billy Gilbert
- The Taxi Boys - Wreckety Wrecks (1933 short) as Billy
- The Taxi Boys - Taxi Barons (1933 short) as Billy
- The Taxi Boys - Call Her Sausage (1933 short) as Heinie Schmaltz
- The Taxi Boys - The Rummy (1933 short) as Schmaltz
- Made on Broadway (1933) as Commissioner Jerry Allesandro (uncredited)
- The Girl in 419 (1933) as Sneezing Patient (uncredited)
- So and Sew (1933 short) as Rudolfo
- This Day and Age (1933) as Manager of Nightclub (uncredited)
- Sons of the Desert (1933) as Mr. Rutledge (voice, uncredited)
- Cockeyed Cavaliers (1934) as Innkeeper (uncredited)
- Music in Your Hair (1934) as husband (with Billy Bletcher and Ty Parvis)
- Peck's Bad Boy (1934) (uncredited)
- Happy Landing (1934) as Husband (uncredited)
- Men in Black (1934, Three Stooges short) as Dangerous Patient (uncredited)
- Evelyn Prentice (1935) as First Chef (uncredited)
- Escapade (1935) as Singer (uncredited)
- Mad Love (1935) as Autograph Seeker on Train (uncredited)
- Pardon My Scotch (1935, Three Stooges short) as opera singer Signor Louis Bellero Cantino (uncredited)
- Curly Top (1935) as The Cook (uncredited)
- Here Comes the Band (1935) as Oswald Carroll (uncredited)
- Hi, Gaucho! (1935) as Cappa Rosa - Del Campo's Foreman (uncredited)
- A Night at the Opera (1935) as Orchestra Member asking Fiorello not to play the piano (uncredited)
- Coronado (1935) as Waiter (uncredited)
- I Dream Too Much (1935) as Cook at Cafe (uncredited)
- Millions in the Air (1935) as Nikolas Popadopolis
- Dangerous Waters (1936) as Carlos (uncredited)
- Sutter's Gold (1936) as Gen. Ramos (uncredited)
- Love on a Bet (1936) as New York Policeman (uncredited)
- The First Baby (1936) as Italian in Park (uncredited)
- One Rainy Afternoon (1936) as Courtroom Doorman (uncredited)
- Three of a Kind (1936) as The Tailor
- Early to Bed (1936) as Burger
- Parole! (1936) as Salvatore Arriolo (uncredited)
- Poor Little Rich Girl (1936) as Waiter (uncredited)
- Kelly the Second (1936) as Fur trader (role deleted) (uncredited)
- The Bride Walks Out (1936) as Mr. Donovan
- The Devil-Doll (1936) as Matin's Butler (uncredited)
- Grand Jury (1936) as Otto, Janitor (uncredited)
- My American Wife (1936) as French Chef (uncredited)
- Pepper (1936) as Man Eating Sandwich (uncredited)
- Bulldog Edition (1936) as George Poppupoppalas (uncredited)
- The Big Game (1936) as Fisher (uncredited)
- Love on the Run (1936) as Maitre d' (uncredited)
- Night Waitress (1936) as Torre - Cafe Owner
- On the Avenue (1937) as Joe Papaloupas
- We're on the Jury (1937) as Mr. Ephraim Allen
- When You're in Love (1937) as Jose the Bartender (uncredited)
- Sea Devils (1937) as Billy (policeman)
- Espionage (1937) as Turk
- China Passage (1937) as Ship's Bartender
- Maytime (1937) as Drunk (uncredited)
- The Man Who Found Himself (1937) as Fat Hobo
- The Outcasts of Poker Flat (1937) as Charley - the Bartender
- Captains Courageous (1937) as Soda Steward (uncredited)
- The Toast of New York (1937) as Photographer
- Broadway Melody of 1938 (1937) as George Papaloopas
- The Firefly (1937) as Inn Keeper
- The Life of the Party (1937) as Dr. Molnac
- One Hundred Men and a Girl (1937) as Garage Owner
- Music for Madame (1937) as Krause
- Fight for Your Lady (1937) as Boris
- Snow White and the Seven Dwarfs (1937) as Sneezy (voice, uncredited)
- Rosalie (1937) as Oloff
- She's Got Everything (1937) as Chaffee - a Creditor
- Once Over Lightly (1938 short) as Professor Dimitrius Kapouris
- Happy Landing (1938) as Counter Man
- Maid's Night Out (1938) as Mr. Papalapoulas
- Joy of Living (1938) as Cafe Owner
- Army Girl (1938) as Cantina Pete
- Block-Heads (1938) as Mr. Gilbert
- My Lucky Star (1938) as Nick
- Breaking the Ice (1938) as Mr. Small
- Mr. Doodle Kicks Off (1938) as Professor Minorous
- Peck's Bad Boy with the Circus (1938) as Bud Boggs
- The Girl Downstairs (1938) as Garage Proprietor
- Forged Passport (1939) as Nick Mendoza
- Million Dollar Legs (1939) as Dick Schultz (uncredited)
- The Under-Pup (1939) as Tolio
- The Star Maker (1939) as Steel Worker
- Rio (1939) as Manuelo
- Destry Rides Again (1939) as Loupgerou
- His Girl Friday (1940) as Joe Pettibone
- Sandy Is a Lady (1940) as Billy Pepino
- Women in War (1940) as Pierre, the Cobbler
- Safari (1940) as Mondehare
- Queen of the Mob (1940) as Mr. Reier
- Cross-Country Romance (1940) as Orestes
- Scatterbrain (1940) as Hoffman
- Lucky Partners (1940) as Charles (uncredited)
- Sing, Dance, Plenty Hot (1940) as Hector
- A Little Bit of Heaven (1940) as Tony
- The Villain Still Pursued Her (1940) as Master of Ceremonies
- The Great Dictator (1940) as Herring
- Seven Sinners (1940) as Tony
- Tin Pan Alley (1940) as Sheik
- A Night at Earl Carroll's (1940) as Machinist's Mate
- No, No, Nanette (1940) as Styles
- The Great Awakening (1941) as Dominic
- Reaching for the Sun (1941) as Amos
- One Night in Lisbon (1941) as Popopopoulos
- Angels with Broken Wings (1941) as Billy Wilson
- New Wine (1941) as Poldi
- Week-End in Havana (1941) as Arbolado
- Song of the Islands (1942) as Palola's Father
- Valley of the Sun (1942) as Judge Homer Burnaby
- Mr. Wise Guy (1942) as Knobby
- Sleepytime Gal (1942) as Chef Popodopolis
- Arabian Nights (1942) as Ahmad
- Shantytown (1943) as Papa Ferrelli
- Spotlight Scandals (1943) as Himself
- Always a Bridesmaid (1943) as Nick Neopolitan
- Crazy House (1943) as Sid Drake
- Three of a Kind (1944) as Billy
- Ever Since Venus (1944) as Tiny Lewis
- Three Is a Family (1944) (uncredited)
- Crazy Knights (1944) as Billy
- Trouble Chasers (1945) as Billy
- Anchors Aweigh (1945) as Cafe Manager
- Fun and Fancy Free (1947) as Willie the Giant (voice)
- The Kissing Bandit (1948) as General Felipe Toro
- Bride of Vengeance (1949) as Beppo (uncredited)
- Down Among the Sheltering Palms (1953) as King Jilouili
- Paradise Alley (1962) as Julius Wilson
- Five Weeks in a Balloon (1962) as Sultan / Auctioneer (final film role)
