= Nat Carr =

American character actor (1886–1944)

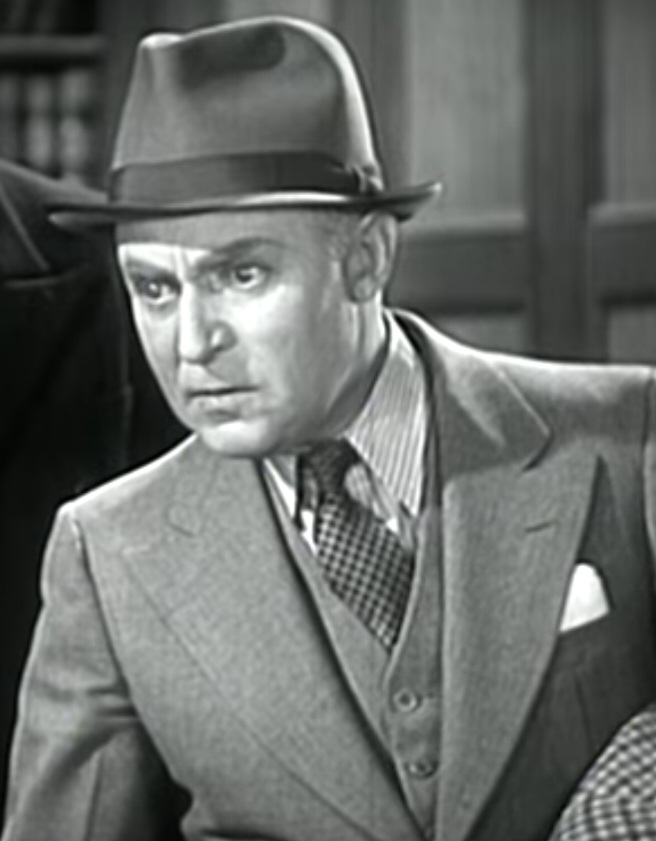
- Carr in Bank Alarm (1937)
- Born: Natan Krechevsky; August 12, 1886
- Died: July 6, 1944 (aged 57); Hollywood, California, U.S.
- Resting place: Forest Lawn Memorial Park, Glendale, California
- Occupation: Actor
- Years active: 1923–1941

Nat Carr (August 12, 1886 – July 6, 1944) was born Natan Krechevsky in Poltava, Russian Empire. His father was a Cantor and grocer. The family moved to Winnipeg, Canada in 1887, where they lived until 1896. They then moved to San Francisco where Nat’s father ran a grocery store and Nat and his brother Henry operated a pawn shop. Nat’s older brother was Alexander Carr, actor in stage and film. Nat followed his brother into ahow business, starting in stand-up comedy and later acting the silent and early talking picture eras. During his eighteen-year career, Carr appeared in over 100 films, most of them features.

== Life and career ==
Carr entered the cinematic industry in the 1925 film, His People, in the featured role of Chaim Barowitz. Although he may have appeared in an earlier film, 1923's Little Johnny Jones. He appeared in the featured role of Levi in The Jazz Singer in 1927. In 1929 Carr co-wrote the story (with Mark Sandrich) for the film, The Talk of Hollywood, in which he also starred. Other notable films in which he appeared include: as the captain of waiter in Raoul Walsh's 1939 crime proto-noir, The Roaring Twenties, starring James Cagney, Priscilla Lane, and Humphrey Bogart; in the role of Crocker in the 1939 Western, Dodge City, starring Errol Flynn and Olivia de Havilland; as one of the doctors in the Bette Davis tour de force, Dark Victory, which also starred Bogart and George Brent; and as one of the reporters in the 1941 war classic, Sergeant York, starring Gary Cooper. Carr's final screen performance was as a tourist in the 1941 comedy-mystery, Passage from Hong Kong.

In 1905, Nat married Gertrude Viola White, who had a few minor roles in film. They had no children. Nat and Alexander Carr’s nephew, Nat Ross, became a film director under their mentorship.

Carr died on July 6, 1944, in Hollywood, California. He was buried in Forest Lawn Memorial Park in Glendale, California.

== Partial filmography ==
- Little Johnny Jones (1923)
- His People (1925)
- The Mystery Club (1926)
- Watch Your Wife (1926)
- Kosher Kitty Kelly (1926)
- Millionaires (1926)
- Her Big Night (1926)
- Private Izzy Murphy (1926)
- Madonna of the Sleeping Cars (1928)
- The Talk of Hollywood (1929)
- Two Plus Fours (1930)
- 50 Million Frenchmen (1931)
- Union Depot (1932)
- The Man from Arizona (1932)
- Big Time or Bust (1933)
- I Can't Escape (1934)
- Marrying Widows (1934)
- Red Blood of Courage (1935)
- Bank Alarm (1937)
- Everybody's Hobby (1939)
- Granny Get Your Gun (1940)
- King of the Lumberjacks (1940)
