= Million Dollar Weekend =

1948 film by Gene Raymond

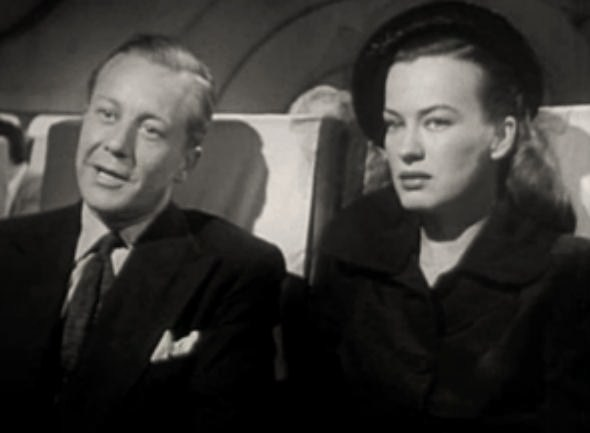
- Gene Raymond and Osa Massen in the film
- Directed by: Gene Raymond
- Written by: Charles Belden (written by); Matty Kemp (original story); Gene Raymond (original story)
- Produced by: Matty Kemp
- Starring: Gene Raymond; Osa Massen
- Cinematography: Paul Ivano
- Music by: Phil Ohman
- Distributed by: Eagle-Lion films
- Release date: October 29, 1948
- Running time: 72 minutes
- Country: United States
- Language: English

Million Dollar Weekend is a 1948 American film noir directed by, and starring, Gene Raymond, based on his original story.

== Plot ==
Stockbroker Nicholas Lawrence (Gene Raymond) has grown tired of his tedious life in Los Angeles and decides one day to escape, stealing cash and securities from his company worth about a million dollars. He buys a plane ticket to Shanghai via Honolulu.

Cynthia Strong (Osa Massen, credited as Stephanie Paull) has just attended her husband's funeral service. After the ceremony, she goes straight to the airport and buys a ticket.

As Cynthia leans back in her seat, she is caught by surprise when a man she knows named Alan Marker (Francis Lederer) comes up to her and claims he saw her murder her husband. Marker wants half the life insurance money to keep his mouth shut, but Cynthia denies his accusation. Marker tells her she has until one hour after the plane lands in Honolulu to decide if she will give him the money.

Cynthia begs Nicholas, who is sitting close to her, for help, saying that the man she just talked to threatened her. Nicholas agrees to help, and pretends to be an acquaintance of Cynthia's when Marker comes back.

Upon their arrival in Honolulu, it turns out they are all staying at the same hotel. Cynthia and Nicholas meet up again on the hotel terrace, while Marker sneaks into Nicholas' room and steals his briefcase.

Cynthia and Nick talk about their respective attempts to flee from their lives. Soon, they are attracted to each other. Cynthia invites Nick to have dinner with her the next day. Nick has to catch his flight and must decline. When Nick returns to his room, he discovers someone has stolen his briefcase. He immediately suspects Cynthia and suspects she was working with Marker.

Cynthia denies the accusation and helps Nick search for Marker, who is missing from the hotel. They eventually track him to the airport and also board his flight, which is en route to San Francisco.

On the plane, Marker shows the other two that he has a gun and confesses to stealing the briefcase. As they arrive in San Francisco and prepare to de-plane, Marker sees to it that Nick is caught by the customs officers, who suspect he is carrying illegal plant life. During the commotion, Marker is able to leave the airplane before Nick and Cynthia.

Nick and Cynthia soon get out of the airport and start looking for Marker in the city's hotels. Nick tells Cynthia about the money in his briefcase, and she tells him about the insurance money she got when her husband died. She suffered many years of abuse from her husband, and one evening after the two of them had dinner with Marker, her husband tried to rape her and when she pushed him away he accidentally fell off their terrace.

Cynthia reveals that Marker tried to blackmail her and Nick believes every word she says. He claims to feel guilty about taking all his clients' money. They decide to return to Los Angeles and try to set things straight. They agree that if they manage to do so, they'll meet a month later in Honolulu.

As Nick is sitting in the restaurant alone, a young woman comes in to buy a bottle of a certain Napoleon brandy, which happens to be exactly the brand that is Marker's favorite. Nick knows this, and tails the girl back to a boardinghouse, where he finds Marker. A fistfight ensues between Nick and Marker, but Nick wins and gets his briefcase back. He returns to Los Angeles. On Monday morning he is able to return the money to the company's safe before it would have been missed.

A month later, Nick and Cynthia meet again in Honolulu, as agreed.

== Cast ==
- Gene Raymond as Nicholas Lawrence
- Osa Massen as Cynthia Strong
- Francis Lederer as Alan Marker
- Robert Warwick as Dave Dietrich
- Patricia Shay as Sally
- James Craven as Dr. George Strong
- Ken Christy as customs inspector
- The Royal Hawaiian Serenaders as Themselves

== Release ==
In New South Wales, Australia, the film was double billed with Tokyo File 212.

== Soundtrack ==
- "My Destiny" (Written by Dorothy Daniels and Dorothy Roberts)
- "Where Have You Been?" (Written by Dorothy Daniels and Dorothy Roberts)
- "Heaven Is in My Blue Hawaii" (Written by Paul Koy)
