= Unexpected Guest (film) =

1947 Hopalong Cassidy Western film

- Directed by: George Archainbaud
- Written by: Clarence E. Mulford (characters), Ande Lamb (screenplay)
- Produced by: Lewis J. Rachmil
- Starring: William Boyd
- Cinematography: Mack Stengler
- Edited by: Fred W. Berger
- Music by: David Chudnow
- Distributed by: United Artists
- Release date: March 28, 1947
- Running time: 61 minutes
- Country: United States
- Language: English

Unexpected Guest is a 1947 American Western film directed by George Archainbaud and starring William Boyd. The film is a serial Western and part of the Hopalong Cassidy series. It is the 57th entry in a series of 66 films.

== Cast ==
- William Boyd as Hopalong Cassidy
- Andy Clyde as California Carson
- Rand Brooks as Lucky Jenkins
- Una O'Connor as Matilda Hackett
- John Parrish as David J. Potter
- Patricia Tate as Ruth Baxter
- Nedrick Young as Ralph Baxter
- Earle Hodgins as Joshua Colter
- Joel Friedkin as Phineas Phipps
- Robert Williams as Matt Ogden
- William Ruhl as Sheriff
