= Cross-Country Romance =

1940 film by Frank Woodruff

- Directed by: Frank Woodruff
- Screenplay by: Jerome Cady; Bert Granet; Helen Meinardi; Edward Melcher; Jo Milward; Jefferson Parker
- Based on: Highway to Romance; 1937 novel by Eleanor Brown
- Produced by: Lee S. Marcus
- Starring: Gene Raymond; Wendy Barrie
- Cinematography: J. Roy Hunt
- Edited by: Harry Marker
- Music by: Roy Webb
- Distributed by: RKO Radio Pictures
- Release date: July 12, 1940 (US)
- Running time: 68 minutes
- Country: United States
- Language: English

Cross-Country Romance is a 1940 American romantic comedy film directed by Frank Woodruff and starring Gene Raymond and Wendy Barrie. With the huge success of It Happened One Night, the 1934 American romantic comedy film directed by Frank Capra and starring Claudette Colbert and Clark Gable, every studio in Hollywood attempted to cash in with a similar storyline. In addition to this film, there was also Love on the Run (1936) from MGM, The Bride Came C.O.D. (1941) by Warner Bros.; even Columbia Pictures, which had made It Happened One Night, produced the musical remake Eve Knew Her Apples (1945).

== Plot ==
High-profile heiress Diane North stows away in the trailer of a bacteriologist Dr. Lawrence "Larry" Smith to escape from her own wedding. Larry has to drive cross country to San Francisco to catch a ship to China, where he will work with an eminent expert on a cure for a serious disease. When he discovers his stowaway, Diane tells him she is poverty-stricken Maggie "Jonesy" Jones, making her way to a slightly less poor uncle. Larry tries to get rid of his passenger at every opportunity, but she falls in love and uses every wile to stay with him.

Meanwhile, her wealthy, ditsy mother offers a reward for her safe return, fearing she has been kidnapped, but her fiance Walter Corbett remains remarkably blase about the whole thing.

At a lunch counter, two grifters recognize Diane, and sneak aboard the trailer, but not before conning Orestes, the diner's cook, into giving them two $10 bills for $5. Orestes finally figures out he has been conned and telephones for the police. All four are taken to the Omaha police station. Police Captain G. G. Burke finally sorts things out and lets Larry and Diane go.

They get married. Then, at one stop, Diane secretly calls her mother and asks her to do something to stop Larry from going to China (which he insists on doing alone). Larry hears on the radio that the famous doctor has found a cure, so he no longer has a reason to go.

He also discovers Diane's true identity and promptly dumps her. On his way back through Omaha, he is arrested. Captain Burke is sure he kidnapped and possibly murdered Diane, and is frustrated when the alleged victim shows up looking for her husband.

Diane confesses to Larry that the news story was faked by her mother. He leaves once more for San Francisco, by air as time is running short. On board the ship, Larry is delighted to be invited to dine with the captain, until he discovers that the guest of honor is one of the owners of the shipping line: Diane. He storms out, but she persuades him to take her back.

== Cast ==
- Gene Raymond as Dr. Lawrence "Larry" Smith
- Wendy Barrie as Diane North, aka Maggie "Jonesy" Jones
- Hedda Hopper as Mrs. North
- Billy Gilbert as Orestes
- G.P. Huntley as Walter Corbett
- Berton Churchill as Col. Conway
- Tom Dugan as Pete
- Edgar Dearing as Sweeney
- Frank Sully as Mike
- Cliff Clark as Police Capt. G.G. Burke
- Dorothea Kent as Millie
- Alan Ladd as Mr. Williams, first mate (uncredited)
- Esther Dale as Mrs. McGillicuddy
- Bess Flowers as Mrs. North's secretary
- Herbert Rawlinson as Ship's Capt. Brawley
- Landers Stevens as Bishop at Wedding

Cast notes

- This was one of Hedda Hopper's final roles before leaving the screen to work full time at her influential gossip column, which she had started in 1938. This is also one of the many bit parts for Alan Ladd before his 1942 breakthrough.
