= I Can't Escape =

- Film poster
- Directed by: Otto Brower
- Written by: Nathan Asch (story); Jerry Sackheim (story); Faith Thomas (writer)
- Produced by: Max Alexander (producer); Peter E. Kassler (associate producer); Sam Wiesenthal (associate producer)
- Starring: See below
- Cinematography: Jerome Ash
- Edited by: Frederic Knudtson; Louis Sackin
- Distributed by: Beacon Productions; Syndicate Pictures
- Release date: July 5, 1934
- Running time: 60 minutes 26 minutes (American edited TV version)
- Country: United States
- Language: English

I Can't Escape is a 1934 American melodrama film directed by Otto Brower. The film is also known as The Magic Vault (American alternative title).

== Plot ==
Steve Nichols, attired in full evening dress, asks where he can get an alcoholic drink. The surprised man tells Steve since Prohibition in the United States was repealed he can find one anywhere. Going to a night club, he sits alone at a table.

A call girl named Mae enters the club and asks the bartender where her client she is to rendezvous with is; the bartender mistakenly points to Steve. The two find they have rapport, but the one who really hired Mae, an obnoxious university student, reclaims Mae. Mae criticizes Steve's behavior, as he won't fight for what is his, he's not much of a man. Steve candidly replies that he has just been released from prison for good behavior and would return for five years of his sentence if he acted violently. He also admits his evening dress is rented.

The student, encouraged by the fact that Steve won't give him any problems, publicly abuses Mae in the club. Steve leaps into action to physically instruct the punk in acceptable etiquette and carries on the lesson with the punk's friends. Mae turns out the lights in the club for the pair to make their escape.

Realizing they are destined to love each other forever, Steve and Mae marry.

Steve can find no work without references, as well as his prison record, except for walking the streets as a human billboard for one dollar a day. Steve is about to go into a life of crime until Mae threatens to return to her own ways, which stops Steve in his tracks.

Things change when an investment management business hires Steve if he'll break his parole conditions and work under a false name; Steve agrees.

Things are looking up until a starving young man comes to their home searching for Steve. Realizing his condition, they feed him and say the Steve he is looking for has left. The young man confides that he will kill Steve in revenge for his father's suicide due to Steve's actions, for which he received the blame.

Knowing Steve's background, the investment firm is a crooked one, intending to use Steve as a fall guy when they abscond with their client's money.

== Cast ==
- Onslow Stevens as Steve Nichols, alias Steve Cummings
- Lila Lee as Mae Nichols
- Russell Gleason as Tom Martin
- William Desmond as Parole Officer Donovan
- Hooper Atchley as Harley
- Otis Harlan as Jim Bonn
- Kane Richmond as Bob, college boy at club
- Clara Kimball Young as Mrs. Wilson
- Eddie Gribbon as Regan - Beat Cop
- Nat Carr as Mr. Watson, clothier
- Richard Cramer as Joe, bartender-pimp
