= Maid's Night Out =

1938 film by Ben Holmes

- Directed by: Ben Holmes; Charles Kerr (assistant)
- Written by: Bert Granet (adaptation)
- Based on: Certified radio play by Willoughby Speyers
- Produced by: Robert Sisk
- Starring: Joan Fontaine; Allan Lane
- Cinematography: Frank Redman
- Production company: RKO Radio Pictures
- Distributed by: RKO Radio Pictures
- Release date: March 4, 1938
- Running time: 64 minutes
- Country: United States
- Language: English

Maid's Night Out is a 1938 American romantic comedy film made by RKO Radio Pictures and starring Joan Fontaine and Allan Lane. It was directed by Ben Holmes from a screenplay by Bert Granet, adapted from the radio play Certified (also produced by RKO) by Willoughby Speyers.

== Plot ==
Playboy Bill Norman wants to go on a six-month expedition to study tropical fish, but his wealthy businessman father wants him to buckle down and go to work. When Mr. Norman catches Bill trying to "borrow" his yacht, they make a wager. If Bill works for 30 days at the family dairy business without making a single mistake, Mr. Norman will finance his expedition. Norman assumes he will be an executive, but his father makes him deliver milk instead.

On his route, he meets Sheila Harrison, whom he thinks is a maid, but is in fact a socialite. She and her mother are in such deep financial trouble, they cannot pay their bills or their loyal maid Mary. Mrs. Harrison pins her hopes on Sheila marrying wealthy Wally Martin, but Sheila does not like him.

At first, Sheila does not much care for Bill either, but he eventually wins her affections. However, when Sheila is pressured by her mother to break her date with Bill to attend a charity ball with Wally, she encounters Bill there with his beautiful cousin Adele. Wally insists Sheila is his fiancée, and she does not believe Bill's claim that Adele is merely his cousin, so the couple break up.

After Bill is tossed out for punching Wally, Adele overhears Sheila deny she is engaged, and tells Bill. Tim Hogan, a fellow milk deliveryman and friend, drives Bill to Sheila's home to try to speak to her, but the police are called and Bill is arrested.

Hogan manages to convince Sheila that Bill loves her; it also helps when he reveals who Bill actually is. Mary spots them leaving in Hogan's milk truck and assumes Sheila is being kidnapped. The police are alerted. Meanwhile, Sheila puts on a uniform and sets out to deliver the milk on the last day of the bet. Bill gets himself bailed out and catches up with Sheila. Chased by the police, they complete Bill's rounds and return to the dairy with seconds to spare to win the bet. Mr. Norman and Mrs. Harrison recognize each other, and once they figure out what is going on, approve of Bill and Sheila's relationship.

== Cast ==
- Joan Fontaine as Sheila Harrison
- Allan Lane as Bill Norman
- Billy Gilbert as Mr. Papalapoulas, a street vendor of fish whose cart is run into by Wally's car
- Cecil Kellaway as Geoffrey, the Normans' butler
- Hedda Hopper as Mrs. Harrison
- William Brisbane as Wally Martin
- Vicki Lester as Adele
- Hilda Vaughn as Mary
- George Irving as Mr. Norman
- Frank M. Thomas as "Mac" McCarthy
- Solly Ward as Mischa, a communist dairy employee
- Eddie Gribbon as Tim Hogan
