= The Mystery Club =

1926 film by Herbert Blaché

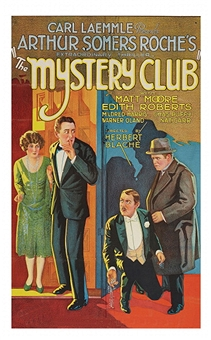
- Directed by: Herbert Blaché
- Written by: Helen Broderick; Edward J. Montagne
- Based on: The Crimes of the Armchair Club by Arthur Somers Roche
- Produced by: Carl Laemmle
- Starring: Matt Moore; Edith Roberts; Mildred Harris; Warner Oland; Chas. Puffy; Nat Carr
- Cinematography: Jackson Rose
- Production company: Universal Pictures
- Distributed by: Universal Pictures
- Release date: August 30, 1926
- Running time: 7 reels
- Country: United States
- Language: Silent (English intertitles)

The Mystery Club is a 1926 American silent mystery film directed by Herbert Blaché and starring Matt Moore, Edith Roberts, and Mildred Harris. It was based on a story from Arthur Somers Roche's Crimes of the Armchair Club.

== Plot ==
As described in a film magazine, the Mystery Club is an organization of millionaires, the youngest member of which is Dick Bernard. At the instigation of Cranahan, they wager that crimes can be committed without detection by the police, the arbiter of the wager being Inspector Burke. An agreement is drawn up which calls for the forfeiture of $25,000 should any crime go awry. They draw lots to decide which of the members is to be the criminal. None of the members know which of them has the lot with the double X, Burke being the sole possessor of the details.

The next night the papers carry the news that Burke has been murdered. Alarmed as they are, the members agree to cancel the agreement, but upon opening the safe they find that the paper is missing. The jewels of Mrs. Kate Vanderveer are stolen and she finds, in place of the gems, a note implicating the club. Confronted with the theft, all the members suspect one another. Nancy Darrell, a beautiful young woman with whom Dick is in love, surprises them by telephoning that the jewels will be returned upon payment of $50,000. Unwilling to face the public scandal, they make up the amount. Dick delivers the money to a low dive where he is astonished to find the lovely Nancy on familiar terms with some rough characters. No sooner is he inside the club again than a note is slipped under the door announcing that the Fairchild baby had been kidnapped for a ransom of $25,000. Again fearing notoriety, they pay. A clever forgery costs them another $100,000 and a jewel robbery is then laid at their door. Dick, following Nancy to a rooming house where he believes the jewels are hidden, fights off a thug who had attempted to make love to the young woman. She saves Dick by stopping the final thrust and he escapes to the club where he is astounded to see Cranahan, a club member, embracing the girl he has just left.

Cranahan, who has been vainly trying to collect money from the club members to endow the institute for reclaiming criminals, of which he is the head, introduces Nancy as his niece and explains that it was all a hoax to get the club members and others interested in the subject of criminology. The crimes were perpetrated and executed by some of the inmates of his institution, with the connivance of Inspector Burke. So relieved are the members to get back their money and to find themselves relieved of the crime burden, that they gladly contribute handsome checks to the institution. Dick feels he is getting a bargain when he accepts the love of the priceless Nancy in exchange for his generous check.

== Cast ==
- Matt Moore as Dick Bernard
- Edith Roberts as Nancy Darrell
- Mildred Harris as Mrs. Kate Vandeerveer
- Charles Lane as John Cranahan
- Warner Oland as Eli Sinsabaugh
- Henry Hebert as Scott Glendenning
- Charles Puffy as Alonzo
- Alphonse Martell as Sengh
- Finch Smiles as Wilkins
- Earl Metcalfe as Red
- Nat Carr as Eric Hudson
- Jed Prouty as Amos Herriman
- Alfred Allen as Inspector Burke
- Sidney Bracey as Detective
- Monte Montague as Snaky

== Preservation ==
With no prints of The Mystery Club located in any film archives, it is a lost film.

== Bibliography ==
- Munden, Kenneth White. The American Film Institute Catalog of Motion Pictures Produced in the United States, Part 1. University of California Press, 1997.
