= No, No, Nanette (1940 film) =

1940 film by Herbert Wilcox

- Directed by: Herbert Wilcox
- Written by: Ken Englund (screenplay)
- Produced by: Merrill G. White (associate producer); Herbert Wilcox (producer)
- Starring: Anna Neagle
- Cinematography: Russell Metty
- Edited by: Elmo Williams
- Distributed by: RKO Radio Pictures
- Release date: December 13, 1940
- Running time: 96 minutes 126 minutes (Ontario, Canada)
- Country: United States
- Language: English
- Budget: $570,000
- Box office: $940,000

No, No, Nanette is a 1940 American musical film directed by Herbert Wilcox. It is based on both the 1919 stage play No, No, Nanette and the 1930 film No, No, Nanette.

No, No, Nanette was one of several films the British producer/director made with Anna Neagle (whom he married in 1943) for RKO studios in the United States.

== Plot ==
"Happy" Jimmy Smith lives on the fashionable North Shore of Long Island in New York with his wife Susan and adult niece Nanette. He is having financial difficulties due to his philandering and Susan refusing to give him more money. His problems get worse when Sonya from Syracuse, New York shows up, demanding the money he promised her for her acting career.

Meanwhile, theatrical producer William Trainor, an old friend of Jimmy's, is casting a new show. To help out her Uncle Jimmy, Nanette cajoles Bill into casting Nanette in his new show. In the process, Bill falls in love with Nanette and paints a portrait of her. Then Betty from Bridgeport, Connecticut, shows up, wanting money. Jimmy flees to New York City, where he encounter Kitty from Kansas, whom Jimmy also promised a career as an artist.

Nanette now works to placate Kitty. She ask artist Tom Gillespie to teach Kitty the art trade. Tom, like Bill, also falls in love with Nanette. Now Betty reappears, demanding $5,000 from Jimmy. To raise the money, Nanette sells her portrait to a cigarette company. This angers Tom, who had planned to exhibit his masterpiece in art galleries.

With Tom angry at her, Nanette goes out with Bill. He convinces her to meet him at the airport that night so they can elope to Nevada and get married. Nanette arrives at the airport and boards the plane to Nevada. Meanwhile, Susan also boards the plane, heading to Nevada to divorce Jimmy. By another coincidence, Jimmy is on the same flight, connecting to the Virgin Islands

At the end of the film, Susan and Jimmy are reconciled. In a surprise, Bill has brought Tom on the plane so that he can go with Nanette to Nevada and marry her.

== Cast ==
Anna Neagle as Nanette

- Anna Neagle as Nanette
- Richard Carlson as Tom Gillespie
- Victor Mature as William Trainor
- Roland Young as Mr. "Happy" Jimmy Smith
- Helen Broderick as Mrs. Susan Smith
- ZaSu Pitts as Pauline Hastings
- Eve Arden as Kitty
- Billy Gilbert as Styles
- Tamara as Sonya
- Stuart Robertson as Stillwater Jr. / Stillwater Sr.
- Dorothea Kent as Betty
- Aubrey Mather as Remington, the butler
- Mary Gordon as Gertrude, the cook
- Russell Hicks as "Hutch" Hutchinson

== Production ==
Victor Mature was borrowed from Hal Roach.

== Soundtrack ==
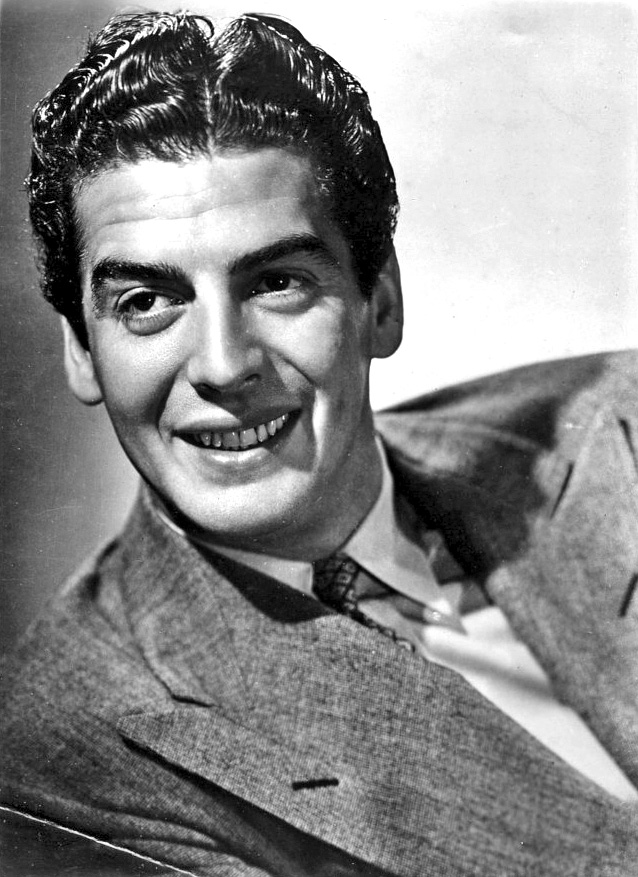
Victor Mature as Bill Trainor

- Anna Neagle – "No, No, Nanette" — Vincent Youmans (music) and Otto Harbach (lyrics)
- Anna Neagle and Roland Young – "I Want to Be Happy" — Vincent Youmans and Irving Caesar
- Tamara – "I Want To Be Happy"
- Eve Arden – "I Want To Be Happy"
- Sung by Anna Neagle and Richard Carlson – "I Want To Be Happy"
- Anna Neagle and Richard Carlson – "Tea For Two" — Vincent Youmans and Irving Caesar
- "Ochi Chornya" — Russian cabaret song, music derived from Florian Hermann's Valse Hommage, op. 21 (1879); lyrics by Yevhen Hrebinka, first published in Literaturnaya Gazeta (17 January 1843)

== Reception ==
=== Box office ===
Although No, No, Nanette was popular, its cost meant it made a small loss of $2,000.

=== Critical ===
Variety wrote:

Musical comedies rarely have much story. That's all right. No one expects them to. Plot is compensated for in a hit tune show by good music. That's an elementary show business lesson taught in a class that producer Herbert Wilcox must have skipped. In making a film version of the 1925 Broadway hit ... Wilcox saves all the book but very little of the music. 'Tea for Two' and 'I Want to Be Happy', as well as the title tune, 'No, No, Nanette' have been reduced to virtually incidental music. Even at that, Wilcox has been fortunate. Nanette has a pretty good plot as musical comedy plots go. He has erred, however, in complicating it instead of simplifying it, as was needed. Wilcox has been lavish, however, in instilling production values in Nanette and there's no denying, despite their age, the lilt of the Vincent Youmans tunes.
