= Faith Thomas (screenwriter) =

American screenwriter

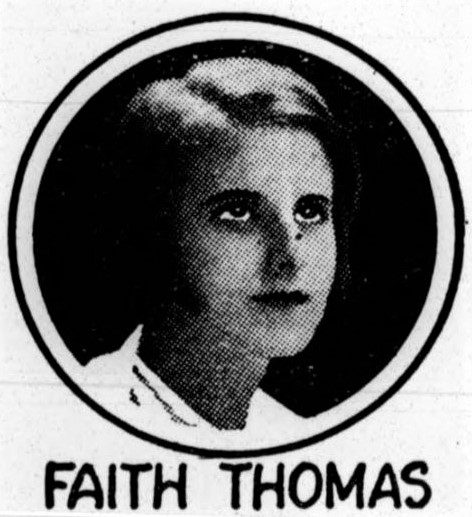
- From a 1927 advertisement
- Born: Faith Helen Thomas; April 24, 1902; Superior, Wisconsin, USA
- Died: August 7, 1982 (aged 80); West Hollywood, California, USA
- Occupation: Screenwriter

Faith Thomas (1902-1982) was an American screenwriter active during the 1920s through the 1940s.

== Biography ==
Faith was born in Superior, Wisconsin, to Benjamin Thomas and Matilda Koehler. After her schooling, she became a stenographer and a court reporter in her home state. By the early 1920s, she had relocated to Hollywood, where after working as a stenographer she eventually began writing screenplays for Universal Pictures. She was on staff at Universal early as 1924 (when she was noted as the person in charge of production on Where the Worst Begins), although she did not get her first credit until 1928's That's My Daddy.

== Selected filmography ==
- That's My Daddy (1928)
- Red Hot Speed (1928)
- Silks and Saddles (1929)
- The Big Bluff (1933)
- I Can't Escape (1934)
- Hollywood Boulevard (1936)
- Conspiracy (1939)
- Rock River Renegades (1942)
