= 50 Million Frenchmen =

1931 film

Fifty Million Frenchmen
- Lobby card
- Directed by: Lloyd Bacon
- Written by: Joseph Jackson; Eddie Welch; Al Boasberg
- Based on: 1929 Musical play: Cole Porter; Herbert Fields
- Starring: John Halliday; Claudia Dell; William Gaxton; Helen Broderick; Ole Olsen; Chic Johnson
- Cinematography: Devereaux Jennings (Technicolor)
- Edited by: Robert O. Crandall
- Music by: Cole Porter
- Production company: Warner Bros. Pictures
- Distributed by: Warner Bros. Pictures
- Release date: February 14, 1931
- Running time: 74 minutes
- Country: United States
- Language: English
- Budget: $484,000
- Box office: $430,000

Fifty Million Frenchmen is a 1931 American pre-Code Technicolor musical comedy film directed by Lloyd Bacon. The film was produced and released by Warner Bros. Pictures and was based on Cole Porter's 1929 Broadway musical Fifty Million Frenchmen.

The film was originally intended to be released late in 1930 but was shelved because of perceived public apathy toward musicals. Warner Bros. released the film in February 1931 after removing all of the music. The film was released outside the United States as a full musical comedy in 1931.

== Plot ==
Wealthy Jack Forbes bets his friend Michael Cummins that he can woo and win Lu Lu Carroll without using any of his money or connections. Cummins hires Simon and Peter, a pair of erstwhile detectives, to ensure that Forbes does not win his bet. Instead, Simon and Peter befriend Cummins and decide to help him.

== Cast ==
- Ole Olsen as Simon Johanssen
- Chic Johnson as Peter Swanson
- William Gaxton as Jack Forbes
- Helen Broderick as Violet
- John Halliday as Michael Cummins
- Claudia Dell as Lu Lu Carroll
- Lester Crawford as Billy Baxter
- Evalyn Knapp as Miss Wheeler-Smith
- Charles Judels as Pernasse – Hotel Manager
- Carmelita Geraghty as Marcelle Dubrey
- Nat Carr and Vera Gordon as Jewish tourists
- Bela Lugosi as Orizon the Magician (uncredited)

== Music ==
50 Million Frenchmen was originally a Cole Porter musical, but the songs were omitted from all prints of the film in the United States because recent box-office receipts for musical films were below expectations and the studios perceived that the public had grown tired of musicals.

== Release ==
According to Warner Bros. records, the film earned $401,000 domestically and $29,000 internationally.

== Reception ==
In a contemporary review for The New York Times, critic Mordaunt Hall wrote: "Only a few mildly amusing episodes are depicted ... This film has been produced without the songs of Cole Porter and the prismatic work is at times poorly lighted. The players, including Olsen and Johnson, William Gaxton, Helen Broderick, John Halliday, Claudia Dell, go about their work with marked enthusiasm, but they are unfortunate in the vehicle."

== Preservation status ==
Only a black-and-white copy of the cut print released in 1931 in the United States is known to have survived. It is unknown whether any copies exist of the complete film that was released intact in other countries.

== See also ==
- List of early color feature films
