= Hollywood Summer Theater =

1956 American anthology TV series

- Genre: Anthology
- Presented by: Gene Raymond
- Country of origin: United States
- Original language: English

Original release
- Release: August 3 – September 28, 1956

Hollywood Summer Theater is an American anthology television series that aired on CBS from August 3 to September 28, 1956. The series was hosted by actor Gene Raymond Among the actors appearing were Merle Oberon, Laraine Day, Joanne Dru, Rod Cameron, Ricardo Montalbán, and Preston Foster.
