= The Life of the Party (1937 film) =

1937 film by William A. Seiter

- Directed by: William A. Seiter
- Screenplay by: Bert Kalmar & Harry Ruby and Viola Brothers Shore
- Story by: Joseph Santley
- Produced by: Edward Kaufman; Samuel J. Briskin (uncredited)
- Starring: Joe Penner; Gene Raymond; Parkyakarkus; Harriet Hilliard
- Cinematography: J. Roy Hunt
- Edited by: Jack Hively
- Music by: Roy Webb (musical director)
- Production company: RKO Radio Pictures
- Distributed by: RKO Radio Pictures
- Release date: September 3, 1937
- Running time: 77 minutes
- Country: United States
- Language: English
- Budget: $489,000
- Box office: $584,000

The Life of the Party is a 1937 American musical comedy film produced by RKO. It was directed by William A. Seiter and starred Joe Penner, Gene Raymond, Parkyakarkus and Harriet Hilliard. It recorded a loss of $111,000.

== Plot ==
Aspiring singer Mitzi Mantos and her agent Pauline are on their way to Santa Barbara, California by train. Also on the train are society scion Barry Saunders accompanied by Oliver. Barry will lose an inheritance of 3 million dollars if he marries before the age of 30 and Oliver was hired by Barry's mother to assure this. Mitzi and Barry meet when her slipper is caught between two railroad cars and he falls for her. Unfortunately she disappears without him getting her name but leaving the shoe behind.

All four check into the same hotel where Barry hires hotel detective Parky to find the mysterious girl. Pauline tries to get an audition for Mitzi with Dr. Molnac for his traveling musical revue. Mitzi's mother, Countess Mantos, arrives also at the hotel, together with her friend Mrs. Penner and son Joe Penner. Both women have intentions to marry Mitzi to Joe. Barry meets Mitzi finally and proposes marriage to her three years in the future. Misunderstandings lead to a situation that Mitzi and Barry must pretend that they are married. Hearing that, Countess Mantos orders at once the bridal suite of the hotel for the young couple.

Pauline and Oliver organize a wedding party with Dr. Molnac's troupe performing. In addition Pauline schemes to get Mitzi the audition. She hires Parky and Joe to prevent Dr. Molnac's singer, Susan, to perform. Mitzi, taking her place, is a hit. Barry's mother arrives, informed by Oliver. She admits having lied about her and Barry's age for years. Barry is indeed thirty since his last birthday four months ago.

== Cast ==
- Joe Penner as Penner
- Gene Raymond as Barry
- Parkyakarkus as Parky
- Harriet Hilliard as Mitzi
- Victor Moore as Oliver
- Helen Broderick as Pauline
- Billy Gilbert as Dr. Molnac
- Ann Miller as Betty
- Richard Lane as Hotel Manager
- Franklin Pangborn as Beggs
- Margaret Dumont as Mrs. Penner
- Ann Shoemaker as Countess Martos
- Betty Jane Rhodes as Susan
- George Irving as Mr. Van Tuyl
- Winifred Harris as Mrs. Van Tuyl
- Charles Judels as Maitre d'Hotel

Uncredited (in order of appearance)
Cyril Ring	night club patron
Bess Flowers	night club patron
Ben Alexander	orchestra leader
Frank Mills	night club waiter
Mary Forbes	Mrs. Saunders
Carol Adams	night club dancer
