= She's Got Everything (film) =

1937 film directed by Joseph Santley

- Directed by: Joseph Santley
- Screenplay by: Harry Segall; Maxwell Shane
- Story by: Joseph Hoffman; Maxwell Shane
- Produced by: Albert Lewis
- Starring: Gene Raymond; Ann Sothern; Victor Moore; Helen Broderick; Parkyakarkus; Billy Gilbert
- Cinematography: Jack MacKenzie
- Edited by: Frederic Knudtson
- Music by: Frank Tours
- Production company: RKO Radio Pictures
- Distributed by: RKO Radio Pictures
- Release dates: December 31, 1937 (limited); January 21, 1938 (US)
- Running time: 72 minutes
- Country: United States
- Language: English

She's Got Everything is a 1937 American romantic comedy film directed by Joseph Santley from a screenplay by Harry Segall and Maxwell Shane, based on a story by Shane and Joseph Hoffman. The film stars Gene Raymond and Ann Sothern, with supporting performances by Victor Moore, Helen Broderick, Parkyakarkus (also known by his real name, Harry Einstein), and Billy Gilbert. RKO Radio Pictures produced and distributed the picture, which was released on the final day of 1937.

== Plot summary ==
Heiress Carol Rogers returns from a long overseas vacation to learn her father has died and saddled her with a mountain of debt. To keep her creditors at bay, her Aunt Jane and pal Waldo contrive to get her hired as an assistant to wealthy coffee magnate Fuller Partridge, hoping it will lead to love and eventually marriage. Unfortunately, the plan is beset by obstacles, especially when a bumbling hypnotist hired to put a romance spell on Carol misses and casts it on Aunt Jane instead.

== Cast ==
- Gene Raymond as Fuller Partridge
- Ann Sothern as Carol Rogers
- Victor Moore as Waldo Eddington - a Bookie
- Helen Broderick as Aunt Jane Carter
- Harry Parke as Nick Zyteras (as Parkyakarkus)
- Billy Gilbert as Chaffee - a Creditor
- William Brisbane as Roger - aka Madame Helene
- Solly Ward as Professor Alphonso Alberto Corrio
