= P. J. Wolfson =

American writer, film producer and screenwriter

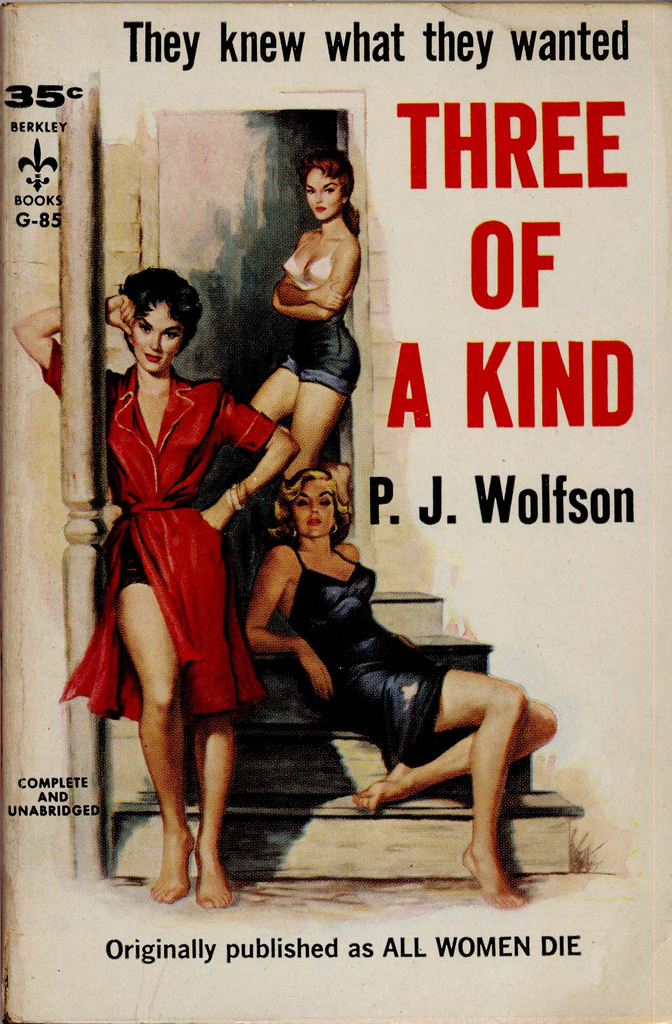
- Three of a Kind by P. J. Wolfson, 1957
- Born: Pincus Jacob Wolfson; May 22, 1903; New York City, US
- Died: April 16, 1979 (aged 75); Los Angeles, California, US
- Occupations: Screenwriter; producer; writer

Pincus Jacob Wolfson (May 22, 1903 – April 16, 1979) was an American pharmacist, novelist, screenwriter, film producer, and film director.

== Early life ==
Pincus Jacob Wolfson was born to Russian-Jewish immigrants in New York City. His father worked as a plumber. Pincus studied pharmacy at Fordham University.

== Career ==
While working in a pharmacy in Madison Square Garden, he wrote his first novels.

Wolfson published his first novel, Bodies Are Dust, in 1931, and later, published twice, under two different titles, in French. It was called a "masterpiece" by Jean-Patrick Manchette.

Allen Rivkin, an advertising copy writer, who went to Hollywood and joined the RKO Pictures publicity department, formed a film writing team with Wolfson, who got a writer’s contract on the strength of "Bodies Are Dust". They started at Universal Pictures the same day. Through a luncheon conversation that day decided to collaborate on a story. In less than two years the pair wrote ten screen plays. They later wrote for the B. P. Schulberg company at Paramount Pictures.

He worked for Metro-Goldwyn-Mayer, RKO Pictures, Columbia Pictures, Paramount Pictures. He wrote numerous scripts for film and television. He produced 30 episodes of the television series I Married Joan between 1952 and 1955.

== Works ==
Novels

- Bodies Are Dust (1931)
- Summer Hotel (1932)
- All Women Die (1933)
- My Flesh of Brass (1934)
- How Sharp the Point (1959)

== Partial filmography ==
Writer

- 1933: Picture Snatcher by Lloyd Bacon with James Cagney
- 1933: The Tourbillon Dance by Robert Z. Leonard with Joan Crawford and Clark Gable
- 1935: Reckless Youth by Victor Fleming with Jean Harlow and William Powell
- 1935: The Mad Love of Hands by Karl Freund with Peter Lorre and Frances Drake
- 1936: Carolyn wants to Divorce by Leigh Jason with Barbara Stanwyck, Gene Raymond and Robert Young
- 1937: The Enterprising Mr. Petrov by Mark Sandrich with Fred Astaire and Ginger Rogers
- 1937: Sea Devils by Benjamin Stoloff with Victor McLaglen and Preston Foster
- 1938: Marriage Incognito by George Stevens with Ginger Rogers and James Stewart
- 1939: Allegheny Uprising by William A. Seiter with Claire Trevor and John Wayne
- 1940: Vigil in the Night by George Stevens with Carole Lombard and Brian Aherne
- 1940: He Stayed for Breakfast by Alexander Hall with Loretta Young and Melvyn Douglas
- 1941: Our Wife by John M. Stahl with Melvyn Douglas, Ruth Hussey and Ellen Drew
- 1942: Embrace the Bride by Alexander Hall with Joan Crawford and Melvyn Douglas
- 1947: Suddenly, It's Spring by Mitchell Leisen with Paulette Goddard and Fred MacMurray
- 1947: The Exploits of Pearl White by George Marshall with Betty Hutton and John Lund
- 1948: Saigon by Leslie Fenton with Alan Ladd and Veronica Lake

Director

- 1939: Boy Slaves with Anne Shirley

Producer

- 1938: The Mad Miss Manton by Leigh Jason with Barbara Stanwyck and Henry Fonda
- 1939: Boy Slaves
- 1939: Allegheny Uprising by William A. Seiter with Claire Trevor and John Wayne
- 1943: My Kingdom for a Cook by Richard Wallace with Charles Coburn, Marguerite Chapman, and Bill Carter.
- 1948: Saigon by Leslie Fenton with Alan Ladd and Veronica Lake
