= The Bride Walks Out =

1936 film by Leigh Jason

- Theatrical release poster
- Directed by: Leigh Jason
- Screenplay by: P. J. Wolfson; Philip G. Epstein
- Story by: Howard Emmett Rogers
- Produced by: Edward Small
- Starring: Barbara Stanwyck; Gene Raymond; Robert Young; Ned Sparks; Helen Broderick
- Cinematography: J. Roy Hunt
- Edited by: Arthur Roberts
- Music by: Roy Webb
- Production company: RKO Pictures
- Distributed by: RKO Pictures
- Release date: July 10, 1936 (USA)
- Running time: 75 minutes
- Country: United States
- Language: English
- Budget: $289,000
- Box office: $670,000

The Bride Walks Out is a 1936 American romantic comedy film that was directed by Leigh Jason, and stars Barbara Stanwyck, Gene Raymond, Robert Young, Ned Sparks, and Helen Broderick. The film, which is based on an original story by Howard Emmett Rogers, is about a woman whose husband forces her to give up her job as a fashion model. When she cannot meet her financial obligations, the woman secretly gets another job. The Bride Walks Out is the first of six films Edward Small made at RKO Pictures.

== Plot ==
Michael Martin and his friend Paul Dodson, as planned, get themselves fired from a company that pays them less than another company for which they both have secretly been working. With their new employer's higher wages, Michael marries the reluctant Carolyn, his love interest who has expensive tastes, at a marriage-license bureau. Michael forces Carolyn to quit her job as a model for a fashion store.

At the bureau, Michael and Carolyn argue, infuriating a security guard, who arrests Michael. In a court, a drunken millionaire named Hugh McKenzie, who is charged with disorderly conduct, decides to pay Michael's fine. Once out of jail, the Martins repays Hugh the money.

Despite being settled as a housewife, Carolyn still buys expensive items, but unbeknown to Michael, their furniture are repossessed months later to cover unpaid payments. Hugh buys their repossessed furniture and has the items restored to their original positions. Michael has been unaware of the full story until he encounters Carolyn's longtime maid, who admits to cooking their food since Carolyn returned to her former job. Michael becomes angry toward Carolyn for her deceit, and Carolyn scolds Michael for being ungrateful and then files for divorce.

Michael and Paul go to Hugh's department-store company to break a window. Rather than being sent to jail, they are escorted to Hugh's office. Hugh admits to falling in love with Carolyn, whom he has been trying to seduce and has dated. To prevent Carolyn from marrying Hugh, Michael decides to take a job offer in South America, where he will be likely in danger, so he can insure his life for $50,000 (equivalent to $1,160,000 in 2025).

Paul's wife Mattie discovers Paul's beneficiary papers and forbids him from going to South America. Paul and Mattie go to tell Carolyn and Hugh about Michael's imminent departure. To prevent Michael from leaving for the trip, Hugh drives Carolyn and the Dodsons to the station and sends a security guard to instigate a fight with Michael. Carolyn, Paul, and Mattie are arrested instead of Michael after taking credit for Hugh's schemes. Michael jumps and clutches the police patrol truck, and he and Carolyn reconcile their marriage. Carolyn decides to quit her modeling job and become a housewife again.

== Cast ==
- Barbara Stanwyck as Carolyn Martin
- Gene Raymond as Michael Martin
- Robert Young as Hugh McKenzie
- Ned Sparks as Paul Dodson
- Helen Broderick as Mattie Dodson
- Willie Best as Smokie
- Robert Warwick as Mr. McKenzie
- Billy Gilbert as Mr. Donovan
- Wade Boteler as Field Engineer
- Hattie McDaniel as Carolyn's Maid

== Reception ==
The film made a profit of $164,000.
