= Walking on Air (1936 film) =

1936 American film directed by Joseph Santley

- Directed by: Joseph Santley
- Screenplay by: Bert Kalmar; Harry Ruby; Viola Brothers Shore; Rian James
- Based on: Count Pete; 1935 story in Hearst's International-Cosmopolitan by Francis M. Cockrell
- Produced by: Edward Kaufman
- Starring: Gene Raymond; Ann Sothern
- Cinematography: J. Roy Hunt
- Edited by: George Hively
- Music by: Nathaniel Shilkret; Harry Ruby
- Production company: RKO Radio Pictures
- Release date: September 11, 1936 (US)
- Running time: 70 minutes
- Country: United States
- Language: English

Walking on Air is a 1936 American comedy film starring Gene Raymond and Ann Sothern, with a supporting cast which includes Jessie Ralph and Henry Stephenson. It was directed by Joseph Santley using a screenplay by Bert Kalmar, Harry Ruby, Viola Brothers Shore, and Rian James, based on the short story, "Count Pete", written by Francis M. Cockrell. Produced by RKO Radio Pictures, they released the film on September 11, 1936.

== Cast ==
- Gene Raymond as Pete Quinlan, aka Count Pierre Louis de Marsac
- Ann Sothern as Kit Bennett
- Jessie Ralph as Evelyn Bennett
- Henry Stephenson as Mr. Horace Bennett
- George Meeker as Tom Quinlan
- Gordon Jones as Joe
- Maxine Jennings as Flo Quinlan
- Alan Curtis as Fred Randolph
- Anita Colby as Ex-Mrs. Fred Randolph
- Patricia Wilder as KARB Receptionist
