= Meet the Missus (1937 film) =

1937 film directed by Joseph Santley & Eddie Donahue

- Directed by: Joseph Santley; Eddie Donahue
- Screenplay by: Jack Townley; Bert Granet; Joel Sayre
- Story by: Jack Goodman; Albert Rice
- Produced by: Albert Lewis
- Starring: Victor Moore; Helen Broderick; Anne Shirley
- Cinematography: Jack MacKenzie
- Edited by: Frederic Knudtson
- Music by: Roy Webb
- Production company: RKO Radio Pictures
- Distributed by: RKO Radio Pictures
- Release date: June 4, 1937 (US)
- Running time: 65 minutes
- Country: United States
- Language: English

Meet the Missus is a 1937 American domestic comedy film directed by Joseph Santley, using a screenplay by Jack Townley, Bert Granet, and Joel Sayre, based on an original story by Jack Goodman and Albert Rice. The movie was produced and distributed by RKO Radio Pictures, and was initially released on June 4, 1937. The film stars Victor Moore and Helen Broderick (in the fifth of their six 1936–38 films) as well as Anne Shirley.

== Plot ==
Mrs. Foster loves to enter contests which she never wins. Mr. Foster is exasperated with his wife. The Happy Noodle Company is looking for Mrs. America and Emma Foster becomes a finalist. The couple go to Atlantic City for the finals. Emma never had time to do homemaker chores and during the contest she has to get her husband Otis to do the work. Other husbands were likewise frustrated with the contest and their wives. The wives went full force to out do the other finalists.

== Cast ==
- Victor Moore as Otis Foster - Husband
- Helen Broderick as Emma Foster - Wife
- Anne Shirley as Louise Foster - Daughter
- Alan Bruce as Steve Walton
- Edward H. Robins as Gordon H. Cutting
- William Brisbane as Prentiss
- Frank M. Thomas as Barney Lott
- Ray Mayer as John White
- Ada Leonard as Princess Zarina - Stripper
- George Irving as District Attorney
- Alec Craig as College President
- Willie Best as Mose - Shoe Shine Boy
- Virginia Sale as Mrs. Moseby - Emma's Maid
- Jack Norton as Mr. Norton aka Mr. Cotton Belt

== Critical reception ==
Variety described Meet the Missus as a "rather silly fable" but commented that the stars, Victor Moore and Helen Broderick were "often able" to lift the film "by the sheer force of their collective gifts."
