= Helen Broderick =

American actress (1891–1959)

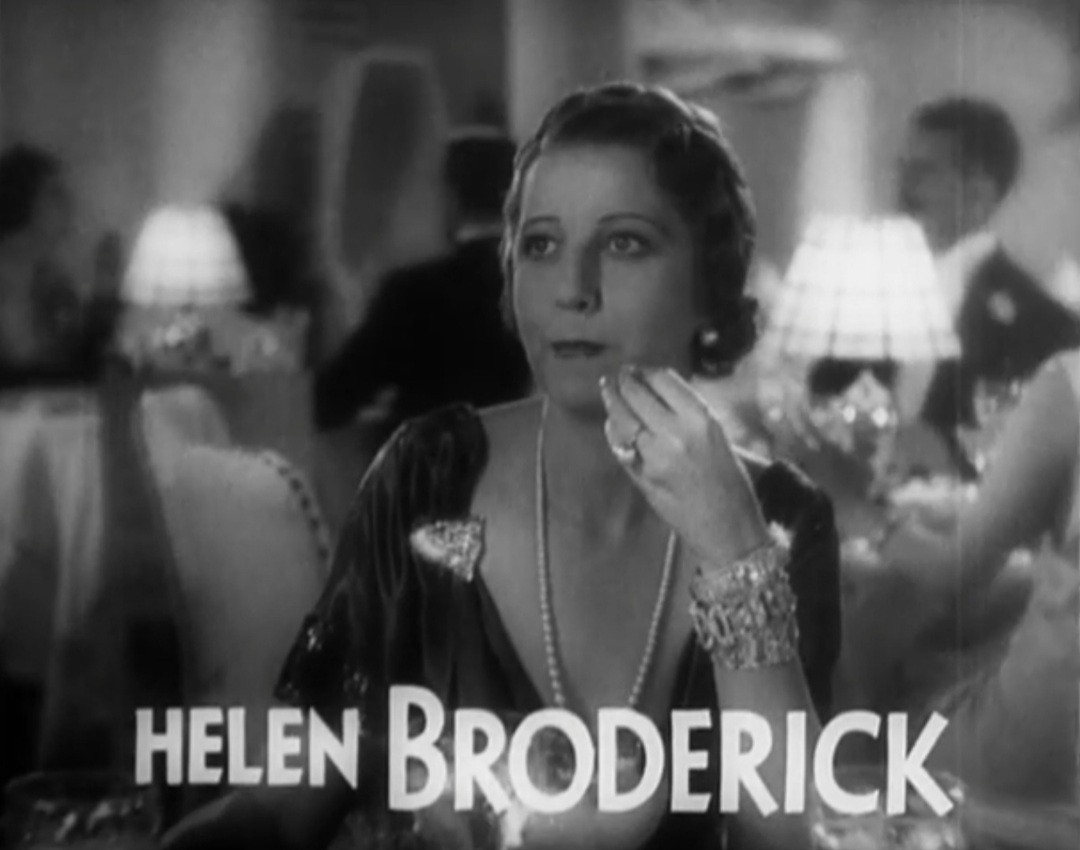
- Broderick in the trailer for Top Hat (1935)
- Born: August 11, 1891; Philadelphia, Pennsylvania, U.S.
- Died: September 25, 1959 (aged 68); Beverly Hills, California, U.S.
- Occupation: Actress
- Years active: 1924–1946
- Spouse: Lester Crawford (m. 1910)
- Children: Broderick Crawford

Helen Broderick (August 11, 1891 – September 25, 1959) was an American actress known for her comic roles, especially as a wisecracking sidekick.

== Career ==
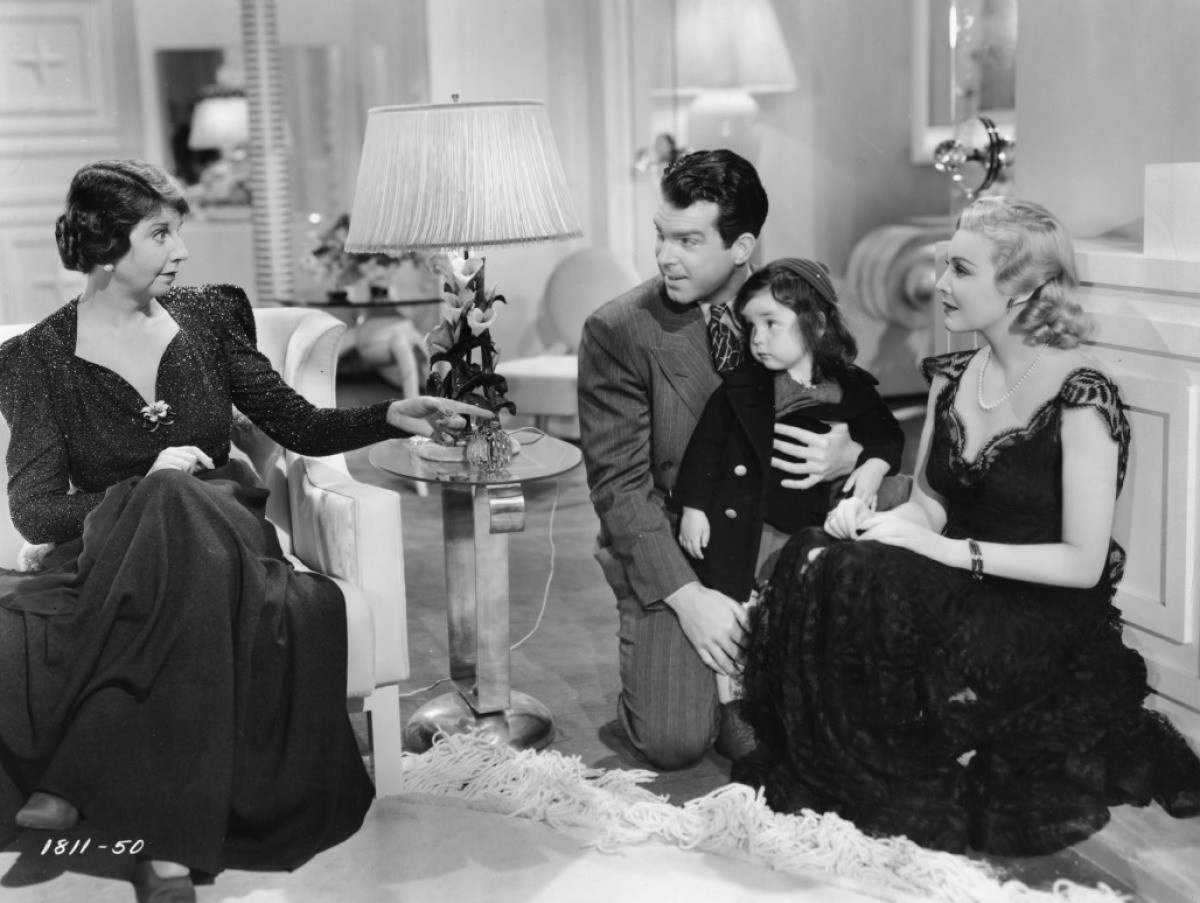
Broderick (left) in Honeymoon in Bali (1939)

Broderick began on Broadway as a chorus girl in the Follies of 1907, the first of Florenz Ziegfeld's annual revues. She went on to perform in the vaudeville duo "Broderick & Crawford" (with her husband) until the entertainment form went out of style, moving to a solo career in her first play Nifties of 23. By the 1920s, Broderick had established herself as a comic performer on Broadway. She appeared in several musical comedies and revues, including Jumping Jupiter (1911), where she reportedly gained attention after substituting for a lead actress. Her Broadway work continued through the decade, and she became known for her dry humor and character roles. By the late 1920s, she was playing leads and featured roles, then shifted from stage to Hollywood in the early 1930s to play the role of Violet Hildegarde in the film adaptation of Cole Porter’s musical Fifty Million Frenchmen. In the early 1930s, she also starred in the Broadway revues The Band Wagon and As Thousands Cheer.

Her move to Hollywood came when her stage successes such as Fifty Million Frenchmen were made into movies, and an image as the quick-quipping friend soon followed in support roles for the Astaire-Rogers movies such as Top Hat (1935), where she played Madge Hardwick, and Swing Time (1936), portraying Mabel Anderson She also appeared in The Rage of Paris (1938), No, No, Nanette (1940 film), Father Takes a Wife (1941), and Stage Door Canteen (film) (1943). Before moving to Hollywood, Broderick toured extensively across the United States with the Ziegfeld Follies troupe between 1910 and 1915. She had leading roles in a few B movies, such as amateur sleuth Hildegarde Withers in Murder on a Bridle Path.

The wife of actor Lester (Pendergast) Crawford (they appear together in the 1930 eight-minute Nile Green, and two 1931 seven-minute comedy shorts: The Spirits of 76th Street and Court Plastered), they were the parents of Academy Award-winning actor Broderick Crawford (1911–1986).

Broderick's last appearance on film was with Deanna Durbin in the comedy Because of Him (1946).

== Death ==
Broderick died after a stroke at the age of 68 on September 25, 1959. Her husband died in November 1962.

== Complete filmography ==
- High Speed (1924) - Minor Role
- The Mystery Club (1926)
- Nile Green (1930 short)
- For Art's Sake (1930, Short)
- Court Plastered (1931, Short) - Helen Smith
- 50 Million Frenchmen (1931) - Violet
- The Spirits of 76th Street (1931, Short)
- Cold Turkey (1931, Short)
- Top Hat (1935) - Madge Hardwick
- To Beat the Band (1935) - Mrs. Freeda McCrary
- Love on a Bet (1936) - Aunt Charlotte
- Murder on a Bridle Path (1936) - Hildegarde Withers
- The Bride Walks Out (1936) - Mattie Dodson
- Swing Time (1936) - Mabel Anderson
- Smartest Girl in Town (1936) - Mrs. Gwen Mayen
- We're on the Jury (1937) - Mrs. Agnes Dean, aka Mrs. Jonathan Ashley Dean
- Meet the Missus (1937) - Emma Foster - Mrs. Mid-Western
- The Life of the Party (1937) - Pauline
- She's Got Everything (1937) - Aunt Jane Carter
- Radio City Revels (1938) - Gertie Shaw
- The Rage of Paris (1938) - Gloria Patterson
- The Road to Reno (1938) - Aunt Minerva
- Service de Luxe (1938) - Pearl
- Stand Up and Fight (1939) - Amanda Griffith
- Naughty but Nice (1939) - Aunt Martha Hogan
- Honeymoon in Bali (1939) - Miss Lorna 'Smitty' Smith
- The Captain Is a Lady (1940) - Nancy Crocker
- No, No, Nanette (1940) - Mrs. Susan Smith
- Virginia (1941) - Theo Clairmont
- Nice Girl? (1941) - Cora Foster
- Father Takes a Wife (1941) - Aunt Julie
- Picture People No. 3: Hobbies of the Stars (1941, Short) - Narrator
- Stage Door Canteen (1943) - Helen Broderick
- Chip Off the Old Block (1944) - Glory Marlow Sr.
- Her Primitive Man (1944) - Mrs. Winthrop
- Three Is a Family (1944) - Irma
- Love, Honor and Goodbye (1945) - Mary Riley
- Because of Him (1946) - Nora (final film role)
