= Gene Raymond =

American actor (1908–1998)

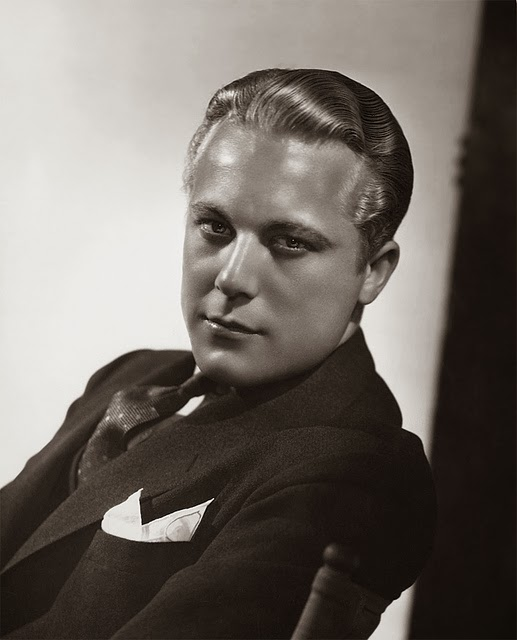
- Studio portrait of Raymond, c. mid-1930s
- Born: Raymond Guion; August 13, 1908; New York City, U.S.
- Died: May 3, 1998 (aged 89); Los Angeles, California, U.S.
- Resting place: Forest Lawn Memorial Park, Glendale, California
- Occupations: Actor; pilot; screenwriter; producer; composer; songwriter; director
- Years active: 1921–1975
- Spouses: Jeanette MacDonald (m. 1937; died 1965); Nelson Bentley Hees (m. 1974; died 1995)
- Musical career
- Instruments: Piano; Vocals
- Military career
- Allegiance: United States
- Branch: U.S. Army Air Force (1940–45); United States Air Force
- Service years: 1940–1968
- Rank: Colonel
- Units: 97th Operations Group; VIII Bomber Command
- Conflicts: World War II
- Awards: Legion of Merit

Gene Raymond (born Raymond Guion; August 13, 1908 – May 3, 1998) was an American film, television, and stage actor of the 1930s and 1940s. In addition to acting, Raymond was also a singer, composer, screenwriter, director, producer, and decorated military pilot.

== Early life ==
Raymond was born August 13, 1908, in New York City. He attended the Professional Children's School while appearing in productions like Rip Van Winkle and Mrs. Wiggs of the Cabbage Patch. His Broadway debut, at age 17, was in The Cradle Snatchers which ran two years. (The cast included Mary Boland, Edna May Oliver, and a young Humphrey Bogart.)

== Film career ==
His screen debut was in Personal Maid (1931). Another early appearance was in the multi-director If I Had a Million with W. C. Fields and Charles Laughton. With his blond good looks, classic profile, and youthful exuberance – plus a name change to the more pronounceable "Gene Raymond" – he scored in films like the classic Zoo in Budapest with Loretta Young, and a series of light RKO musicals, mostly with Ann Sothern. He wrote a number of songs, including the popular "Will You?" which he sang to Sothern in Smartest Girl in Town (1936). His wife, Jeanette MacDonald, sang several of his more classical pieces in her concerts and recorded one entitled "Let Me Always Sing".

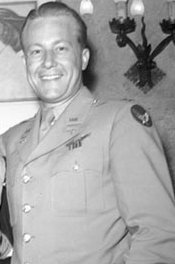
Gene Raymond in his military uniform ca. 1945

His most notable films, mostly as a second lead actor, include Red Dust (1932) with Jean Harlow and Clark Gable, Zoo in Budapest (1933) with Loretta Young, Ex-Lady (1933) with Bette Davis, Flying Down to Rio (1933) with Dolores del Río, Fred Astaire and Ginger Rogers, I Am Suzanne (1934) with Lilian Harvey, Sadie McKee (1934) with Joan Crawford, Alfred Hitchcock's Mr. and Mrs. Smith (1941) with Carole Lombard and Robert Montgomery, and The Locket (1946) with Laraine Day, Brian Aherne, and Robert Mitchum. MacDonald and Raymond made one film together, Smilin' Through, which came out as the U.S. was on the verge of entering World War II.

After service in the United States Army Air Forces Raymond returned to Hollywood. He wrote, directed and starred in the 1949 film Million Dollar Weekend. In later years he appeared in only a few films. His last major film was The Best Man in 1964 with Henry Fonda and Cliff Robertson.

In the 1950s he worked primarily in television, appearing in Playhouse of Stars, Fireside Theatre, Hollywood Summer Theater and TV Reader's Digest. In the 1970s he appeared on ABC Television Network's Paris 7000 and had guest roles in The Outer Limits, Robert Montgomery Presents, Playhouse 90, G.E. Summer Originals, The Man from U.N.C.L.E., Ironside, The Defenders, Mannix, The Name of the Game, Lux Video Theatre, Kraft Television Theatre and U.S. Steel Hour.

== Military service ==
Following the beginning of World War II in Europe in 1939, Raymond felt certain the U.S. would eventually enter the war. He trained as a pilot for that eventuality, and after the attack on Pearl Harbor in 1941, he was commissioned a lieutenant in the Army Air Forces. He served as an observer aboard B-17 anti-submarine flights along the Atlantic coast before attending intelligence school and shipping out to England in July 1942. He served with the 97th Bomb Group before taking over as assistant operations officer in the VIII Bomber Command. He was transferred back to the U.S. in 1943 and piloted a variety of aircraft, both bombers and fighters, in stateside duties. He remained in the United States Air Force Reserve following the war, retiring in 1968 as a colonel, awarded with a Legion of Merit for his efforts during the Vietnam War.

== Personal life ==
Raymond was notorious in Hollywood for being outspoken against the studio system, saying that it was not "living up to expectations". The only actors that he had faith in were Fred Astaire and Ginger Rogers, two people that he claimed "knew what they were doing". He was one of the first actors of the time to go freelance, although he admitted that it was mostly to spite the studios.

He also excelled at sports, such as gymnastics and tennis. George Sidney once called Raymond "the most gorgeous thing the world had ever seen".

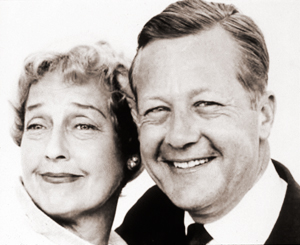
Raymond with wife Jeanette MacDonald in the late 1950s.

Raymond married Jeanette MacDonald in 1937. He met her at a Hollywood party two years earlier at Roszika Dolly's home; MacDonald agreed to a date, as long as it was at her family's dinner table. Despite the strong relationship, Raymond's mother did not like MacDonald, attempting to snub her a few times (such as arranging her son with Janet Gaynor as a plus one at a charity ball), and did not attend the wedding.

The Raymonds lived in a 21-room Tudor Revival mansion named Twin Gables with their pet dogs, birds and their horse White Lady, which Raymond gave to MacDonald as a birthday present; after MacDonald's death, it was briefly owned by John Phillips and Michelle Phillips from The Mamas and Papas.

MacDonald often worried about her husband's self-esteem. Although she appreciated his support, MacDonald wished that their success was equal; when Raymond turned down her offer to join one of her music tours, she did not feel let down: "Trailing along on my tours would make him 'Mr. MacDonald', a galling label for any self-respecting man. As it was, he was called 'Mr. MacDonald' often enough to make me admire tremendously his good sportsmanship in taking it on the chin." Raymond was sometimes mistaken for Nelson Eddy by MacDonald's fans and passersby, which MacDonald later admitted that she never liked either: "Of course we always laughed it off — sometimes Gene even obliged by signing Nelson's name — but no one will ever know the agonies I suffered on such occasions. More than anything else in the world those days, I wanted to see him receive as much acclaim as I, to spare him these humiliations." When she reunited with Maurice Chevalier in 1957, he asked her why she had retired from films, to which she replied, "Because for exactly twenty years I've played my best role, by his [Raymond's] side. And I'm perfectly happy." The two of them were married for almost 28 years until MacDonald's death in 1965.

Despite rumors of getting close with Jane Wyman, in 1974, Raymond married Nelson Bentley Hees and they lived together in Pacific Palisades. Hees died from Alzheimer's in 1995.

Raymond devoted time to Jeanette MacDonald's International Fan Club, befriending president Clara Rhoades, and taking a few members out to lunch annually. His last public appearance was June 27, 1997, at the 60th-anniversary banquet of the Fan Club at Beverly Wilshire Hotel.

Raymond was a Republican and a charter member of the Hollywood Republican Committee. He supported Barry Goldwater in the 1964 United States presidential election.

During the time of the Hollywood Blacklist, he and MacDonald did not involve themselves with the HUAC investigations; neither were ever summoned to a hearing (MacDonald openly disagreed with the situation in a radio interview).

== Death ==
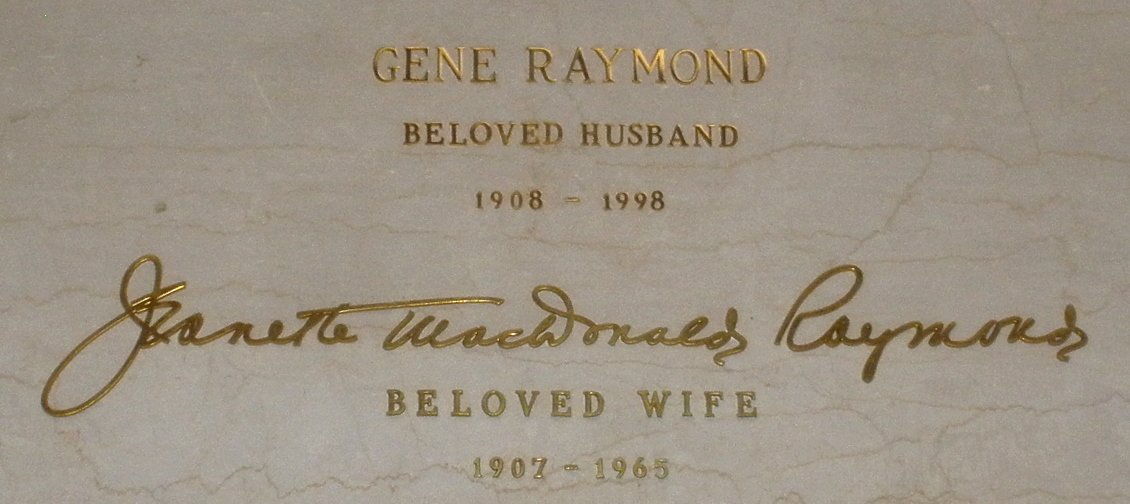
The crypt Raymond shares with his first wife Jeanette MacDonald.

On May 3, 1998, at 89 years of age, Raymond died of pneumonia at the Cedars-Sinai Medical Center in Los Angeles, California. His body was interred next to Jeanette MacDonald's in the Freedom Mausoleum at Forest Lawn, Glendale.

== Legacy ==
For his contributions to the motion picture and television industries, Gene Raymond has two stars on the Hollywood Walk of Fame located at 7001 Hollywood Boulevard (motion pictures) and 1708 Vine Street (television).

== Controversy ==
=== Sexuality and abuse allegations ===
Biographer Sharon Rich reported in her Nelson Eddy and Jeanette MacDonald biography, Sweethearts, that Raymond and MacDonald had a rocky marriage. This began on their honeymoon when MacDonald allegedly discovered Raymond in bed with Buddy Rogers. Sharon Rich was friends with MacDonald's sister Blossom Rock and knew Raymond as well.

Biographer E. J. Fleming alleged that Eddy had confronted Raymond for abusing MacDonald, who was visibly pregnant with Eddy's child while filming Sweethearts which ended with Eddy attacking him and leaving him for dead, reported incorrectly by newspapers as Raymond recovering from falling down the stairs. Raymond was physically unable to father children and MacDonald alluded to this fact in her unfinished autobiography, writing that she returned from her Hawaii honeymoon with Raymond with the knowledge and accurate admittance that "The MacRaymonds had no children." Nevertheless, MacDonald had additional later documented pregnancies while married to Raymond, all of which ended in miscarriage.

MacDonald's 1963 desk diary was sold at auction in 2015. Despite public statements over the years by both MacDonald and Raymond defending their marriage, the handwritten pages reveal that MacDonald and Raymond lived in separate bedrooms or apartments and that MacDonald's health rapidly failed, with her weight noted daily and at times under 100 pounds. She writes of verbal abuse from Raymond, physical neglect, and being left alone for 44 days during the year until the diary ends on November 1, 1963, the date she flew to Houston Methodist Hospital for heart surgery.

== Filmography ==
Features:

- The Marriage Playground (1929) - Rhys Trevor III
- Personal Maid (1931) - Dick Gary
- Ladies of the Big House (1931) - Standish McNeil
- Forgotten Commandments (1932) - Paul Ossipoff
- The Night of June 13 (1932) - Herbert Morrow
- Red Dust (1932) - Gary Willis
- If I Had a Million (1932) - John Wallace (uncredited)
- Zoo in Budapest (1933) - Zani
- Ex-Lady (1933) - Don Peterson
- Ann Carver's Profession (1933) - William 'Bill' 'Lightning' Graham
- Brief Moment (1933) - Rodney Deane
- The House on 56th Street (1933) - Monty Van Tyle
- Flying Down to Rio (1933) - Roger Bond
- I Am Suzanne (1933) - Tony Malatini
- Coming Out Party (1934) - Chris Hansen
- Sadie McKee (1934) - Tommy Wallace
- Transatlantic Merry-Go-Round (1934) - Jimmy Brett
- Behold My Wife (1934) - Michael Carter
- The Woman in Red (1935) - John 'Johnny' Wyatt
- Transient Lady (1935) - Carey Marshall
- Hooray for Love (1935) - Douglas Tyler
- Seven Keys to Baldpate (1935) - William Magee
- Love on a Bet (1936) - Michael MacCreigh
- The Bride Walks Out (1936) - Michael Martin
- Walking on Air (1936) - Pete Quinlan, aka Count Pierre Louis de Marsac
- Smartest Girl in Town (1936) - Richard Stuyvesant Smith
- That Girl from Paris (1936) - Windy McLean
- There Goes My Girl (1937) - Reporter Jerry Martin
- The Life of the Party (1937) - Barry
- She's Got Everything (1937) - Fuller Partridge
- Stolen Heaven (1938) - Carl Lieberlich
- Cross-Country Romance (1940) - Dr. Lawrence 'Larry' Smith
- Mr. & Mrs. Smith (1941) - Jeff Custer
- Smilin' Through (1941) - Kenneth 'Ken' Wayne / Jeremy 'Jerry' Wayne
- The Locket (1946) - John Willis
- Assigned to Danger (1948) - Dan Sullivan
- Sofia (1948) - Steve Roark
- Million Dollar Weekend (1948, also director and writer) - Nicholas Lawrence
- Tales of Tomorrow (1952) - TV Series, episode "Many Happy Returns"
- Hit the Deck (1955) - Wendell Craig
- Plunder Road (1957) - Eddie Harris
- The Best Man (1964) - Don Cantwell
- I'd Rather Be Rich (1964) - Martin Wood
- The Hanged Man (1964, TV Movie) - Whitey Devlin
- Five Bloody Graves (1970) - Voice of Death (voice)

Short films

- Hollywood on Parade No. B-8 (1934) - Himself
- Hollywood on Parade No. B-13 (1934) - Himself
- Screen Snapshots Series 14, No. 9 (1935) - Himself
- Screen Snapshots Series 15, No. 5 (1936) - Himself
- Screen Snapshots Series 18, No. 1 (1938) - Himself
- Screen Snapshots: Hollywood in Uniform (1943) - Himself

== Bibliography ==
- Daly, Maury (1995). Gene Raymond: Renaissance Man. Classic Images.
- Eyman, Scott (2008). Lion of Hollywood: The Life and Legend of Louis B. Mayer. New York: Simon and Schuster. ISBN 9781439107911.
- Baron Turk, Edward (1998). Hollywood Diva: A Biography of Jeanette MacDonald. University of California Press. ISBN 9780520924574.
- McCormick, Maggie (2019). I'll See You Again: The Bittersweet Love Story and Wartime Letters of Jeanette MacDonald and Gene Raymond, Volume 1: The War - and Before. BearManor Media. ISBN 978-1-62933-436-3.
- McCormick, Maggie (2019). I'll See You Again: The Bittersweet Love Story and Wartime Letters of Jeanette MacDonald and Gene Raymond, Volume 2: The Letters. BearManor Media. ISBN 978-1-62933-448-6.
- McCormick, Maggie (2019). I'll See You Again: The Bittersweet Love Story and Wartime Letters of Jeanette MacDonald and Gene Raymond, Volume 3: After the War. BearManor Media. ISBN 978-1-62933-450-9.
