= J. Robert Bren =

Mexican-American screenwriter and producer

- Born: Jose Roberto Bustamante Gutierrez; July 23, 1903; Guanajuato, Guanajuato, Mexico
- Died: October 1, 1981 (aged 78); Los Angeles, California, United States
- Occupations: Screenwriter, producer
- Years active: 1933–57
- Spouse: Gladys Atwater

J. Robert Bren (July 23, 1903 – October 1, 1981) was a Mexican-American screenwriter and producer who was active from the mid-1930s through the mid-1950s. He wrote either the story or screenplay for thirty feature films, as well as producing at least two of those films.

== Life and career ==
Born Jose Roberto Bustamante Gutierrez on July 23, 1903, in Guanajuato, Mexico, he entered the film industry, working on the sound crew for the 1933 film, Face in the Sky. The following year he began writing stories for films, the first of which was the 20th Century Fox film, Looking for Trouble, starring Spencer Tracy and Jack Oakie. He was also one of the story authors for The Band Plays On (1933), starring Robert Young. In 1937 he was one of three writers who expanded an unpublished Damon Runyon story which was turned into the screenplay for Racing Lady, which starred Ann Dvorak, Smith Ballew, and Harry Carey. Bren was one of the writers of the screenplay for The Man Who Found Himself, also in 1937, featuring Joan Fontaine in her first starring role, along with John Beal.

In 1942, Bren co-wrote the original story for the film, In Old California, starring John Wayne. Bren produced the 1945 film, First Yank into Tokyo, from a screenplay he wrote. The film stars Tom Neal and Barbara Hale, and was directed by Gordon Douglas. To open the film, Bren secured the rights to a tape of Japan's prime minister, Kuniaki Koiso, in which he exhorts the Japanese population to "sacrifice everything to repulse the enemy." Bren served on the California State Welfare Board in 1949. Also on the board was Hazel Hurst, a blind young lady who was famous for advocacy for the blind, especially for the use of guide dogs. She was one of the founders of the Hurst Foundation. Bren wrote a screenplay based on Hurst's life. The 1954 film, Naked Alibi, directed by Jerry Hopper and starring Sterling Hayden and Gloria Grahame, was based on a story by Bren and his long-time writing partner, Gladys Atwater. Bren's last big screen writing credit was again as story co-writer with Atwater for The Treasure of Pancho Villa, directed by George Sherman, and starring Rory Calhoun, Shelley Winters and Gilbert Roland.

== Filmography ==
(as per AFI's database)

Year	Film	Position	Notes
1933	Face in the Sky	Sound crew	
1934	The Band Plays On	Story	co-written with Byron Morgan
1934	Looking for Trouble	Story, technical director	
1936	High Tension	Story	co-written with Norman Houston
1936	Without Orders	Screenplay	co-written with Edmund Hartmann
1937	Behind the Headlines	Screenplay	co-written with Edmund Hartmann
1937	The Man Who Found Himself	Screenplay	co-written with Edmund Hartmann, Gloria Atwater, Thomas Lennon
1937	Racing Lady	Story	co-written with Norman Houston
1937	Hideaway	Screenplay	co-written with Edmund Hartmann
1937	Bad Guy	Story	co-written with Kathleen Shepard and Hal Long
1937	China Passage	Screenplay	co-written with Edmund Hartmann
1938	Everybody's Doing It	Screenplay	co-written with Edmund Joseph and Harry Segall
1938	Crime Ring	Screenplay	co-written with Gladys Atwater
1938	Double Danger	Screenplay	co-written with Arthur T. Horman
1938	Smashing the Rackets	Contributions to screenplay	
1938	This Marriage Business	Screenplay	co-written with Gladys Atwater
1939	Five Little Peppers and How They Grew	Story	co-written with Gladys Atwater and Frances Hyland
1939	Parents on Trial	Story and screenplay	co-written with Gladys Atwater (Lambert Hillyer also co-wrote screenplay)
1940	Charter Pilot	Screenplay	co-written with Norman Houston
1940	Argentine Nights	Story	co-written with Gladys Atwater
1942	American Empire	Screenplay	co-written with Gladys Atwater
1942	In Old California	Story	co-written with Gladys Atwater
1942	Underground Agent	Story and screenplay	co-written with Gladys Atwater
1945	First Yank into Tokyo	Producer, screenplay, and story (with Gladys Atwater)	
1945	The Gay Senorita	Story	
1949	El Paso	Producer and story	co-written with Gladys Atwater
1953	The Great Sioux Uprising	Story and screenplay	co-written with Gladys Atwater (screenplay also co-written by Melvin Levy)
1954	Naked Alibi	Story	co-written with Gladys Atwater
1954	Siege at Red River	Story	co-written with Gladys Atwater
1954	Overland Pacific	Screenplay	co-written with Gladys Atwater and Martin Goldsmith
