= Leona Roberts =

American actress

- Leona Roberts in Gone with the Wind (1939)
- Born: Leona Celinda Doty; July 26, 1879; Monroe Township, Ashtabula County, Ohio, U.S.
- Died: January 29, 1954 (aged 74); Santa Monica, California, U.S.
- Years active: 1926–1949
- Spouse(s): Charles James Hutchinson (m. 1900; div. 19??); Walter Beck (m. 19??; div. 19??)
- Children: 2, including Josephine Hutchinson

Leona Roberts (born Leona Celinda Doty; July 26, 1879 – January 29, 1954) was an American stage and film actress.

== Life and career ==
Roberts was born in Monroe Center, Ashtabula County, Ohio. She made her debut on Broadway in 1926 and appeared there in about 40 productions between 1926 and 1945, mostly in supporting roles.

Roberts started her film career in 1926 as the lead in Poor Mrs. Jones, produced by the United States Department of Agriculture. She went to Hollywood in 1937 and played in over 40 films, mostly in motherly supporting roles. She portrayed "society gossip" Mrs. Meade in Gone with the Wind (1939).

Roberts also appeared with Cary Grant and Katharine Hepburn in the screwball comedy Bringing Up Baby (1938) as the house servant Mrs. Gogarty, as well in Of Human Hearts (1938) with James Stewart and The Blue Bird (1940) with Shirley Temple.

In 1941, she returned to Broadway, where she worked until the mid-1940s. Subsequently, Roberts worked again in Hollywood and made a few last films there, including a small part in The Loves of Carmen (1948). She made her last film in 1949.

== Personal life and death ==
Roberts had been a regular parishioner of the Catholic church. After retiring, she dedicated the last years of her life to charitable and religious causes until her death. Roberts died in 1954, age 74. She was the mother of actress Josephine Hutchinson.

== Filmography ==
- Poor Mrs. Jones! (1926) – Lane Jones
- Border Cafe (1937) – Mrs. Emily Whitney
- Super-Sleuth (1937) – Mrs. Effington (uncredited)
- There Goes the Groom (1937) – Martha
- Fight for Your Lady (1937) – Cleaning Woman
- Quick Money (1937) – Gossiping Woman (uncredited)
- Crashing Hollywood (1938) – Extra Assigned to Stage 6 (uncredited)
- Everybody's Doing It (1938) – Woman at Bar (uncredited)
- Of Human Hearts (1938) – Sister Clarke
- Bringing Up Baby (1938) – Mrs. Gogarty
- Condemned Women (1938) – Kate Holt
- This Marriage Business (1938) – Mrs. Platt
- Having Wonderful Time (1938) – Mrs. Shaw
- Crime Ring (1938) – Mrs. Wharton
- The Affairs of Annabel (1938) – Mrs. Hurley
- I Stand Accused (1938) – Mrs. Davis
- Kentucky (1938) – Grace Goodwin
- Boy Slaves (1939) – Farm Woman (uncredited)
- Persons in Hiding (1939) – Ma Bronson
- They Made Her a Spy (1939) – Ella
- Bachelor Mother (1939) – Old Lady Outside Orphanage (uncredited)
- The Spellbinder (1939) – Mrs. Jenkins (uncredited)
- The Escape (1939) – Aunt Mamie Qualen
- Three Sons (1939) – Woman in Store (uncredited)
- Sued for Libel (1939) – Mrs. Trent
- Gone with the Wind (1939) – Mrs. Meade
- Swanee River (1939) – Mrs. Foster
- Thou Shalt Not Kill (1939) – Mrs. Stevens
- The Man Who Wouldn't Talk (1940) – (uncredited)
- The Blue Bird (1940) – Mrs. Berlingot
- Abe Lincoln in Illinois (1940) – Mrs. Rutledge
- Ski Patrol (1940) – Mother Ryder
- Flight Angels (1940) – Mrs. Hutchinson
- Gangs of Chicago (1940) – Mrs. Whitaker
- Anne of Windy Poplars (1940) – (uncredited)
- Queen of the Mob (1940) – Mrs. Greenough
- Golden Gloves (1940) – Mrs. Parker (uncredited)
- Comin' Round the Mountain (1940) – Aunt Polly Watters
- Wildcat Bus (1940) – Emma 'Ma' Talbot
- Blondie Plays Cupid (1940) – Aunt Hannah
- Week-End in Havana (1941) – Passenger
- Dixie (1943) – Woman in Restaurant (uncredited)
- The Madonna's Secret (1946) – Mrs. Corbin
- Boomerang! (1947) – Mrs. Crossman (uncredited)
- The Loves of Carmen (1948) – Ancient Old Gypsy (uncredited)
- Chicago Deadline (1949) – Maggie (uncredited) (final film role)
