= Alice Curtis =

Alice Curtis may refer to:

- Alice B. Curtis (1874–1956), American suffragist, professor, writer
- Alice Turner Curtis (1860–1958), American writer
