= Alec Craig =

Scottish-American character actor (1884–1945)

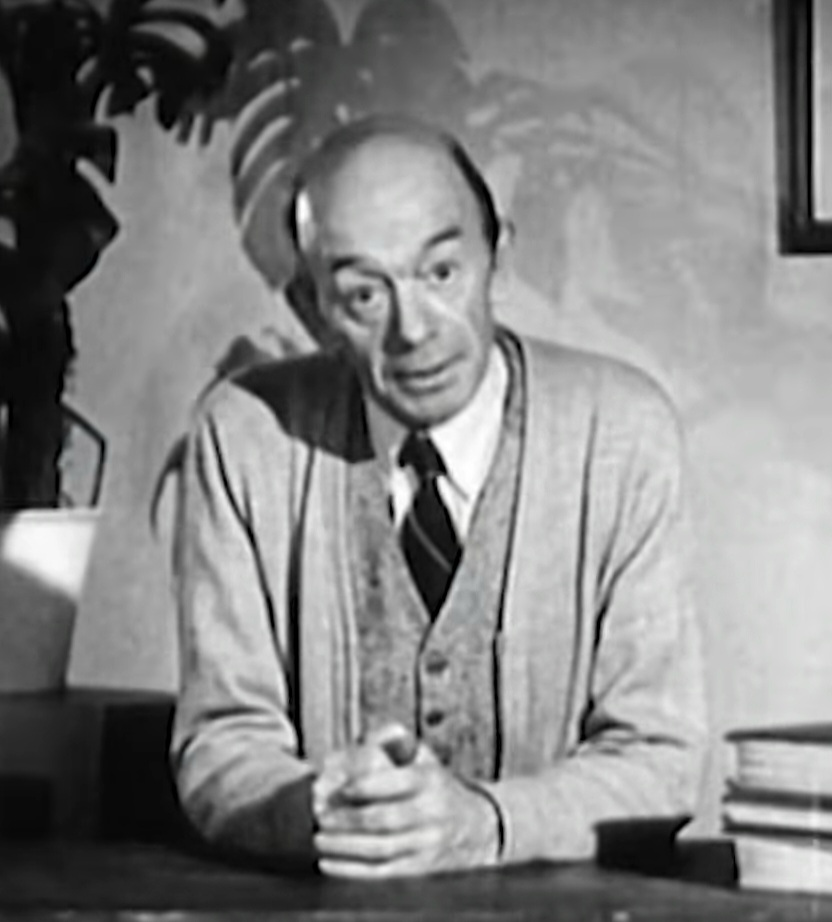
- Criag in Career Girl (1944)
- Born: Alexander Younger Craig; 30 March 1884; Dunfermline, Fife, Scotland
- Died: 25 June 1945 (aged 61); Glendale, California, U.S.
- Resting place: Grand View Memorial Park Cemetery
- Occupation: Actor
- Years active: 1934–1945
- Spouse: Margaret L. Craig (m. 1919)
- Children: 1

Alexander Younger Craig (30 March 1884 – 25 June 1945) was a Scottish-born American character actor, particularly known for his roles in Mutiny on the Bounty (1935) and National Velvet (1944). He was particularly known for portraying stereotypically tight-fisted Scotsmen.

== Early life ==
Alec Craig was born on 30 March 1884 in Dunfermline, Fife, Scotland, the son of James Chapman Craig and his wife Isabella.

== Personal life ==
He married Margaret L. (born 8 July 1888 in Dunfermline) in Edinburgh on 24 September 1919. They arrived in the United States on 2 November 1919. They had a son James C Craig (born 4 December 1922, Berkeley, California). He became a naturalized American citizen on 14 July 1939.

== Death ==
Craig died of tuberculosis on 25 June 1945, aged 61, in Glendale, California. He is buried there at Grand View Memorial Park Cemetery.

== Partial filmography ==
- The Little Minister (1934) – Villager Saying 'Reverend Is Single' (uncredited)
- Sweepstake Annie (1935) – 2nd Sweepstakes Ticket Seller (uncredited)
- Vanessa: Her Love Story (1935) – Worker for George (uncredited)
- Born to Gamble (1935) – Prospector at Card Game (uncredited)
- The Old Homestead (1935) – Townsman (uncredited)
- Dressed to Thrill (1935) – Scottish Soldier (uncredited)
- Mutiny on the Bounty (1935) – McCoy
- Little Lord Fauntleroy (1936) – Townsman at Church (uncredited)
- Mary of Scotland (1936) – Donal
- Winterset (1936) – Hobo
- That Girl from Paris (1936) – Justice of the Peace (uncredited)
- China Passage (1937) – Harvey Dinwiddle
- The Man Who Found Himself (1937) – Hobo (uncredited)
- The Woman I Love (1937) – Doctor
- There Goes My Girl (1937) – 'Godfrey' – a Hobo
- Parnell (1937) – Middle-Aged Man (uncredited)
- Meet the Missus (1937) – College President
- Border Cafe (1937) – Whitney Driver (uncredited)
- Super-Sleuth (1937) – Eddie – Doorman
- The Big Shot (1937) – Druggist (uncredited)
- Hideaway (1937) – Jerry Nolan
- Wise Girl (1937) – Dermont O'Neil
- She's Got Everything (1937) – Justice of the Peace (uncredited)
- Crashing Hollywood (1938) – Movie Studio Receptionist
- Double Danger (1938) – Theron's Gardener
- Condemned Women (1938) – Counterman on Ship (uncredited)
- This Marriage Business (1938) – Judge Barrows (uncredited)
- Vivacious Lady (1938) – Joseph – Chauffeur
- Lord Jeff (1938) – Gardener (uncredited)
- If I Were King (1938) – Spy (uncredited)
- Crime Takes a Holiday (1938) – Cleaning Man (uncredited)
- The Arkansas Traveler (1938) – Drunken Printer (uncredited)
- The Lone Wolf Spy Hunt (1939) – Marriage License Bureau Clerk (uncredited)
- They Made Her a Spy (1939) – Canby
- Let Us Live (1939) – Bookkeeper Juror (uncredited)
- Confessions of a Nazi Spy (1939) – McGregor – Scottish Postman (uncredited)
- Bachelor Mother (1939) – Store Watchman (uncredited)
- Career (1939) – Jody (uncredited)
- Night Work (1939) – Mr. Day (uncredited)
- Mr. Smith Goes to Washington (1939) – Speaker (uncredited)
- Rulers of the Sea (1939) – Foreman
- The Secret of Dr. Kildare (1939) – Telephone Repair Man (uncredited)
- Charlie McCarthy, Detective (1939) – Bounds (uncredited)
- The Earl of Chicago (1940) – Fingal's Son (uncredited)
- The Blue Bird (1940) – Groom (uncredited)
- Abe Lincoln in Illinois (1940) – Trum Cogdall
- Zanzibar (1940) – Sailor Brown (uncredited)
- Three Cheers for the Irish (1940) – Callaghan
- And One Was Beautiful (1940) – Michael – Chauffeur (uncredited)
- Phantom Raiders (1940) – Andy MacMillan
- Tom Brown's School Days (1940) – Old Thomas
- Queen of the Mob (1940) – Proprietor (uncredited)
- The Sea Hawk (1940) – Chartmaker
- Golden Gloves (1940) – Editor MacDonald
- Stranger on the Third Floor (1940) – Defense Attorney
- I'm Still Alive (1940) – Mr. Briggs (scenes deleted)
- A Dispatch from Reuter's (1940) – Editor Grant of the Morning Advertiser (uncredited)
- Mr. & Mrs. Smith (1941) – Thomas – Beefeaters Club Clerk (uncredited)
- Meet the Chump (1941) – Justice (uncredited)
- Footlight Fever (1941) – Hattie Drake's Butler (uncredited)
- That Hamilton Woman (1941) – Ship's Minister (uncredited)
- Barnacle Bill (1941) – MacDonald
- Ride on Vaquero (1941) – Waiter Limey (uncredited)
- Shining Victory (1941) – Jeweler
- Out of the Fog (1941) – Man Reporting Fire to Magruder (uncredited)
- Dr. Jekyll and Mr. Hyde (1941) – Tripped Waiter (uncredited)
- The Devil and Daniel Webster (1941) – Eli Higgins (uncredited)
- Three Girls About Town (1941) – Samuel – Potential Casket Customer
- Suspicion (1941) – Hogarth Club Desk Clerk (uncredited)
- The Lone Star Ranger (1942)
- A Date with the Falcon (1942) – Waldo Sampsom / Herman Sampson (uncredited)
- To Be or Not to Be (1942) – Scottish Farmer Without Mustache (uncredited)
- Roxie Hart (1942) – Idler (uncredited)
- The Night Before the Divorce (1942) – Jitters Noonan
- This Above All (1942) – Bus Conductor (uncredited)
- The Mad Martindales (1942) – Coachman
- Mrs. Miniver (1942) – Joe (uncredited)
- The Old Homestead (1942) – McTavish (uncredited)
- The Loves of Edgar Allan Poe (1942) – Angus – Boston Printer (uncredited)
- Wildcat (1942) – Joseph D. Campbell
- Orchestra Wives (1942) – Henry Fink
- Northwest Rangers (1942) – Mac McKenzie – Ship's Mate (uncredited)
- Wrecking Crew (1942) – Charlie
- The Undying Monster (1942) – Will, the Groundsman (uncredited)
- Cat People (1942) – Zookeeper (uncredited)
- Life Begins at Eight-Thirty (1942) – Santa Claus
- Random Harvest (1942) – Comedian (uncredited)
- Tennessee Johnson (1942) – Sam Andrews
- Forever and a Day (1943) – Ambrose Pomfret's Butler
- Action in the North Atlantic (1943) – McGonigle (uncredited)
- It's a Great Life (1943) – Alf (uncredited)
- Coney Island (1943) – Billy (uncredited)
- Appointment in Berlin (1943) – Smitty – News Vendor (uncredited)
- Holy Matrimony (1943) – Aylmer (uncredited)
- Johnny Come Lately (1943) – Court Bailiff (uncredited)
- Lassie Come Home (1943) – Buckles
- Northern Pursuit (1943) – Angus McBain
- The Spider Woman (1943) – Radlik
- The Ghost Ship (1943) – Blind Beggar (uncredited)
- Calling Dr. Death (1943) – Bill – the Watchman
- Jane Eyre (1943) – Footman (uncredited)
- Career Girl (1944) – Theodore 'Pop' Billings – the Landlord
- Passport to Destiny (1944) – Freighter's Cook (uncredited)
- Gaslight (1944) – Turnkey (uncredited)
- The White Cliffs of Dover (1944) – Billings (uncredited)
- Ghost Catchers (1944) – Diggs (uncredited)
- Jungle Woman (1944) – Caretaker
- Mystery of the River Boat (1944) – Chief Engineer
- The Woman in the Window (1944) – Garage Man (uncredited)
- And Now Tomorrow (1944) – Mr. Meade (uncredited)
- National Velvet (1944) – Tim
- Dangerous Passage (1944) – Dawson the Steward
- Tonight and Every Night (1945) – Englishman (uncredited)
- The House of Fear (1945) – Angus (uncredited)
- Bring On the Girls (1945) – Stage Doorman (uncredited)
- A Tree Grows in Brooklyn (1945) – Werner (uncredited)
- The Brighton Strangler (1945) – Vacuuming Bellhop (uncredited)
- Love Letters (1945) – Dodd (uncredited)
- Kitty (1945) – McNab (uncredited)
- Girl on the Spot (1946) – Murgatroid (uncredited)
- Three Strangers (1946) – Man on Park Bench (uncredited) (final film role)
