= William Corson =

American actor (1909–1981)

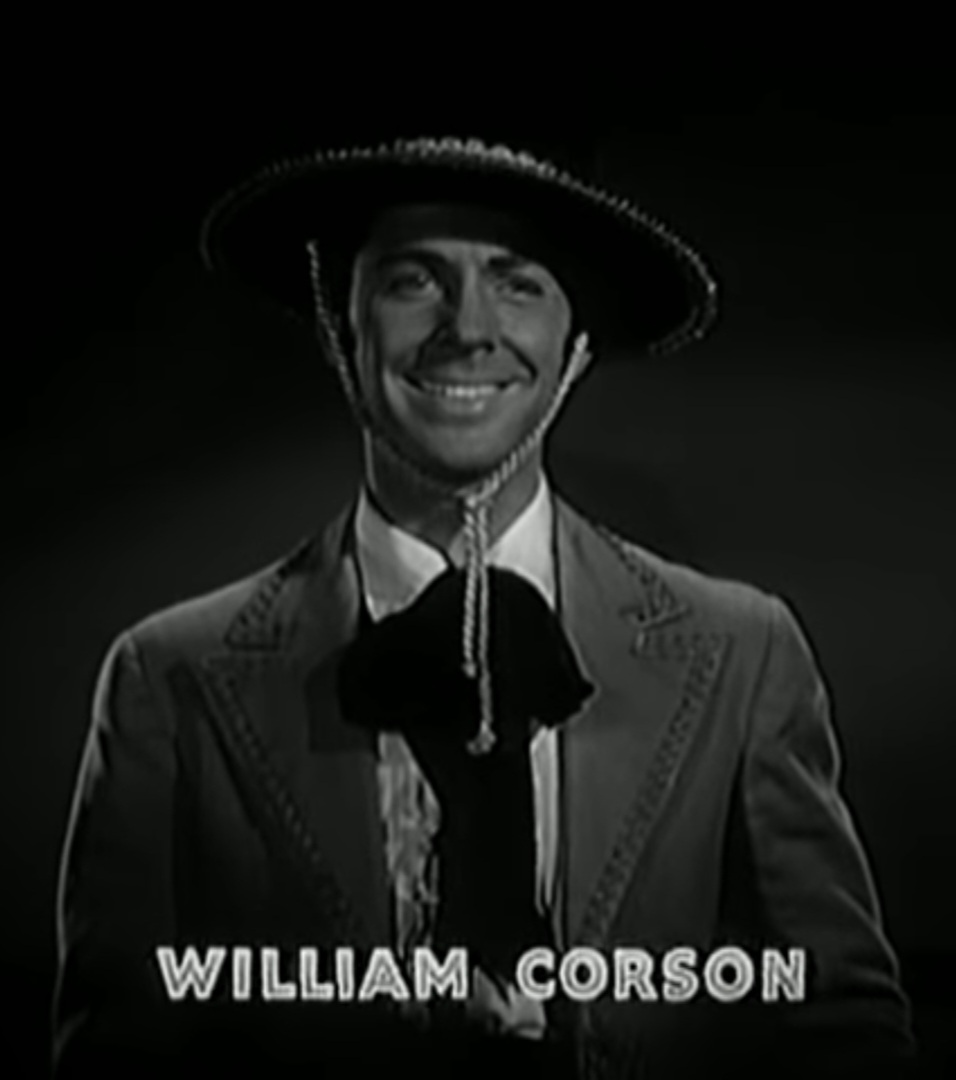
- Corson in Zorro's Fighting Legion (1939)
- Born: December 23, 1909; Seattle, Washington, U.S.
- Died: January 28, 1981 (aged 71); Camano Island, Washington, U.S.
- Occupation: Actor
- Years active: 1937–1939

William Corson (December 23, 1909 – January 28, 1981) was an American film actor.

Corson was a contract player at RKO Pictures.

== Partial filmography ==
- Sea Devils (1937) - Coast Guard Seaman (uncredited)
- China Passage (1937) - Ship's Officer (uncredited)
- The Woman I Love (1937) - (uncredited)
- You Can't Buy Luck (1937) - Reporter (uncredited)
- Behind The Headlines (1937) - Gang Member (uncredited)
- There Goes My Girl (1937) - Dan Curtis
- You Can't Beat Love (1937) - Frame-Up Photographer (uncredited)
- New Faces of 1937 (1937) - Assistant Stage Manager
- On Again-Off Again (1937) - Smith (uncredited)
- Super-Sleuth (1937) - Beckett
- Forty Naughty Girls (1937) - Man Watching Piper Enter Theater (uncredited)
- Hideaway (1937) - Bill Parker
- Music for Madame (1937) - Bus Driver (uncredited)
- Stage Door (1937) - Bill
- Double Danger (1938) - First Chauffeur (uncredited)
- Bringing Up Baby (1938) - Minor Role (uncredited)
- Go Chase Yourself (1938) - Reporter (uncredited)
- Having Wonderful Time (1938) - Camp Waiter (uncredited)
- Sky Giant (1938) - Cadet Trainee Claridge (uncredited)
- Carefree (1938) - Minor Role (uncredited)
- Mr. Doodle Kicks Off (1938) - Henchman (uncredited)
- The Mad Miss Manton (1938) - Ronnie Belden (uncredited)
- Annabel Takes a Tour (1938) - Reporter (uncredited)
- Zorro's Fighting Legion (1939, Serial) - Ramon (final film role)
