= Naked Alibi =

1954 film by Jerry Hopper

- Theatrical release poster
- Directed by: Jerry Hopper
- Screenplay by: Lawrence Roman
- Based on: "Cry Copper"; 1951 story by Gladys Atwater; J. Robert Bren
- Produced by: Ross Hunter
- Starring: Sterling Hayden; Gloria Grahame; Gene Barry
- Cinematography: Russell Metty
- Edited by: Al Clark
- Color process: Black and white
- Production company: Universal Pictures
- Distributed by: Universal Pictures
- Release date: October 1, 1954
- Running time: 86 minutes
- Country: United States
- Language: English

Naked Alibi is a 1954 American film noir crime film directed by Jerry Hopper and starring Sterling Hayden, Gloria Grahame and Gene Barry. It was released on October 1, 1954, by Universal-International. Portions of the film were shot in Tijuana.

== Plot ==
In a California city, police lieutenant Fred Parks interrogates mild-mannered baker Albert Willis about his suspected involvement in a series of violent robberies. When Willis angrily assaults Parks during questioning, Chief Joseph "Joe" E. Conroy intervenes but is pressured to release Willis due to political scrutiny from city councilman Edgar Goodwin, who is investigating allegations of police brutality. That night, Parks is murdered, and Joe takes charge of the case. Despite circumstantial evidence linking Willis to the crime—notably matching bullets from the murder—the police lack definitive proof. Willis flees during a subsequent arrest attempt, sustaining a head injury. Public outrage over his treatment forces Joe to release him again, but Joe orders surveillance on Willis. The baker evades his tail by slipping into a church, and hours later, two officers are killed. When Joe confronts Willis and a scuffle ensues—witnessed by a reporter—Joe is fired for brutality and labeled mentally unstable. Determined to clear his name, he enlists his friend, private detective Matt Matthews, to help track Willis.

Willis, paranoid from being followed, flees to Border City, Mexico, with Joe in pursuit. There, Willis visits his girlfriend Marianna, a nightclub singer who tolerates his abusive behavior out of misguided love. Joe circulates Willis's photo in town but is ambushed by local criminals, who stab and rob him. He is discovered by a boy named Petey and his uncle Charlie, who nurse him back to health. Marianna, living nearby, secretly takes a photo of Willis labeled "Killer or family man?" from Joe's belongings. Confronting Willis at a party, she witnesses his violent temper when he throws a waiter off a balcony. Later, Willis accuses Marianna of infidelity after spotting Joe outside her apartment and brutally beats her. Marianna flees to Joe's hotel, where he reveals Willis's connection to a hijacking ring via an incriminating telegram. As they attempt to deliver the evidence to police, Willis and his henchmen ambush them at the nightclub.

During the confrontation, Joe deduces Willis hid the murder weapon in the California church he previously visited. A barroom brawl orchestrated by Willis's men allows Joe and Marianna to escape, but Willis pursues them into an alley. Joe subdues Willis and forces him into a car, intending to return to California to retrieve the gun. After evading police, they cross the border by stowing Willis in a truck. Upon arrival, Willis escapes and races to the church to retrieve the weapon. Joe and Marianna follow, but police arrest Joe before he can intervene. Marianna enters the church alone, where Willis takes her hostage on the rooftop. Joe breaks through the police cordon and confronts Willis, who shoots Marianna during a struggle. Joe fatally wounds Willis, who falls to his death. As Marianna dies in Joe's arms, she laments they met too late. Carrying her body to an ambulance, Joe watches her covered with a sheet before walking away, his reputation restored but haunted by loss.

== Cast ==
- Sterling Hayden as Chief Joe Conroy
- Gloria Grahame as Marianna
- Gene Barry as Al Willis
- Marcia Henderson as Helen Willis
- Max Showalter as Det. Lt. Fred Parks (as Casey Adams)
- Billy Chapin as Petey
- Chuck Connors as Capt. Owen Kincaide
- Don Haggerty as Matt Matthews
- Stuart Randall as Chief A.S. Babcock
- Frank Wilcox as Councilman Edgar Goodwin
- Don Garrett as Tony
- Richard Beach as Felix
- Tol Avery as Irish
- Paul Levitt as Gerald Frazier
- Fay Roope as Commissioner F.J. O'Day
- Joseph Mell as Otto Stoltz
- Alan DeWitt (uncredited) as Motel proprietor

== Home media ==
On November 5, 2019, Naked Alibi was released on both DVD and Blu-ray formats for the first time by Kino International under its Kino Lorber Studio Classics line with licensing by Universal Pictures. Both formats present the film in its theatrical aspect ratio of 1.85:1 (the film was originally shot in the academy ratio at 1.37:1).
