= Death on the Diamond =

1934 film by Edward Sedgwick

- Directed by: Edward Sedgwick
- Written by: Harvey F. Thew; Joseph Sherman; Ralph Spence
- Based on: Death on the Diamond: A Baseball Mystery Story; 1934 novel by Cortland Fitzsimmons
- Produced by: Lucien Hubbard
- Starring: Robert Young; Madge Evans
- Cinematography: Milton Krasner
- Edited by: Frank Sullivan
- Music by: William Axt
- Production company: Metro-Goldwyn-Mayer
- Distributed by: Metro-Goldwyn-Mayer
- Release date: September 14, 1934
- Running time: 69–72 minutes
- Country: United States
- Language: English

Death on the Diamond is a 1934 comedy-mystery film starring Robert Young. It was based on the novel Death on the Diamond: A Baseball Mystery Story by Cortland Fitzsimmons, directed by Edward Sedgwick and produced and released by Metro-Goldwyn-Mayer.

== Plot ==
Pop Clark, owner and manager of the St. Louis Cardinals, is talking to newspaperman Jimmy Downey. His team was a favorite to win the pennant this season, but they have been performing poorly. Pop tells Jimmy he has signed star pitcher Larry Kelly. Kelly arrives and flirts with Pop's daughter, Frances, the team's secretary.

Pop chases off two former players with ties to organized crime who are trying to bribe players. Pop tells the players he will kick out anyone with ties to gambling or criminals. He then reveals to Frances that if he does not win the pennant, he will lose the franchise to Henry Ainsley and that he borrowed all the money he could just to get Kelly.

Reporter Downey spots criminal Karnes in the stands and asks him why he is hanging out at baseball practice. Karnes threatens him.

Karnes gives a ride to Kelly on the way to a team dinner, and asks him to visit him on his yacht, but Kelly tells him he has to train. When Kelly arrives at the dinner, Downey tells him that Karnes is one of the biggest gamblers in the country. Mickey comes in and says he discovered that someone has put an incapacitating chemical on the baseball gloves. Star hitter Spencer accuses Kelly of being that guy, but Frances forces the two to make up.

At the team's next home game, Ainsley taunts Pop, telling him the team will be Ainsley's by October. Kelly pitches masterfully, and the Cards win on a walk-off hit by Spencer.

In his hotel room, Kelly finds an envelope with $10,000 in cash and a note telling him that a "friend" hopes he will lose the next game. The next day, he pitches a no-hitter. Karnes is furious. As Kelly and Hogan ride a taxi back to the hotel, one of Karnes's men shoots their tire out and they crash. Kelly is injured and is out for two weeks.

Despite Kelly's absence, the team moves into first place in the National League. They need to win two of the last three games to win the pennant. On the train on the way home, Kelly and Spencer quarrel about Frances. On the same train, Ainsley privately tells one of his men to get off the train in Springfield, with no explanation.

In the next game, against the Chicago Cubs, in the bottom of the 8th, with the Cubs leading 6-4 with 2 outs and 2 men on base, the Cardinals get a huge hit from Spencer. Two runs score, but Spencer is shot and tagged out, and the Cardinals lose the game.

The police question everyone, and focus on Kelly not only being absent, but also quarreling with Spencer on the train. Kelly claims he did not want to see Spencer "taking a bow" for being the hero of the game.

Later, several people and a policeman spot a stranger skulking out on the field in the dark, and thinking it might be the killer, jump him, only to discover it is Crawfish, the umpire. O'Toole admits he recovering a lost bottle of eye drops, and did not want anyone to know he needs them.

Downey talks to the chief detective and asks for permission to pursue the story on his own. Downey confronts Karnes in his office and mockingly asks him to give him the "inside scoop" on which player is going to be killed next. Karnes threatens him, but Downey talks his way out of it.

The next day, before the game against the Cincinnati Reds, the players' wives and girlfriends beg them not to play. In the clubhouse, security chase off Karnes's men. As Higgins warms up, Hogan tells him that he has a phone call. Higgins goes inside to take the call and does not return. Pop orders backup pitcher Warmack into the game, and searches for Higgins. Kelly discovers Higgins' body in a locker. A doctor says he was strangled. Pop hides the murder from the team until after the game.

Warmack pitches well, and Hogan wins the game with an inside-the-park home run. Afterwards, Hogan is celebrating by eating his usual hot dog when someone shoots off a loud firecracker. While everyone is distracted, a mysterious hand replaces the mustard jar, and Hogan puts mustard all over his hot dog and dies.

That night in the National League offices, the commissioner and the police meet. As they are about to cancel the game, Pop persuades them to let the game happen. They agree.

He tells Frances he plans to use Kelly the next day, but she talks him into picking Eddie Vernon instead, admitting that she loves Larry. However, Downey convinces Pop that they need Larry to pitch in order to get the killers to show up.

While Kelly is pitching in the final game, he spots a mysterious hand place something in his jacket pocket in the dugout. Kelly throws the ball, knocking out the mystery person. Pop finds a pocket watch with a bomb and throws it high in the air where it detonates harmlessly.

On the floor is Patterson, the trainer. He reaches for a policeman's gun, but is overpowered. He admits he was jealous of Pop, angry that he was a groundskeeper, and hoped to become manager if the Ainsley took control.

Tied at 2 in the bottom of the 9th, Pop goes with a hunch and lets Kelly hit. He hits an inside-the-park home run, and the Cardinals win, clinching the pennant.

Pop confronts Ainsley and says he will turn him over to the police for promising to make Patterson the next manager. Downey explains to Kelly and Frances that he suspected Patterson because when Hogan was about to point out the person who had told him there was a phone call for Higgins, Patterson turned "white to the gills," and when Hogan died, Patterson looked relieved. Kelly and Frances kiss.

== Cast ==
- Robert Young as Larry Kelly
- Madge Evans as Frances Clark
- Nat Pendleton as Larry "Truck" Hogan
- Ted Healy as Terry "Crawfish" O'Toole
- C. Henry Gordon as Joseph Karnes
- Paul Kelly as Jimmie Downey
- David Landau as Pop Clark
- DeWitt Jennings as Mr. Patterson
- Edward Brophy as Police Sgt. Grogan
- Willard Robertson as Police Lt. Luke Cato
- Mickey Rooney as Mickey
- Robert Livingston as Frank "Higgie" Higgins
- Joe Sawyer as Duncan "Dunk" Spencer (as Joe Sauers)

== Production ==
Appearing uncredited in the film were a number of ex-Major Leaguers, including Bob and Irish Meusel, Ping Bodie, Ivan Olson and Pat Flaherty, plus one player who was still very much active, slugger Wally "Red" Berger.

== Reception ==
Leonard Maltin described the film as an "absurd crime tale" while giving it 2 out of 4 stars.

== See also ==
- List of baseball films
