= Hideaway (1937 film) =

1937 film directed by Richard Rosson

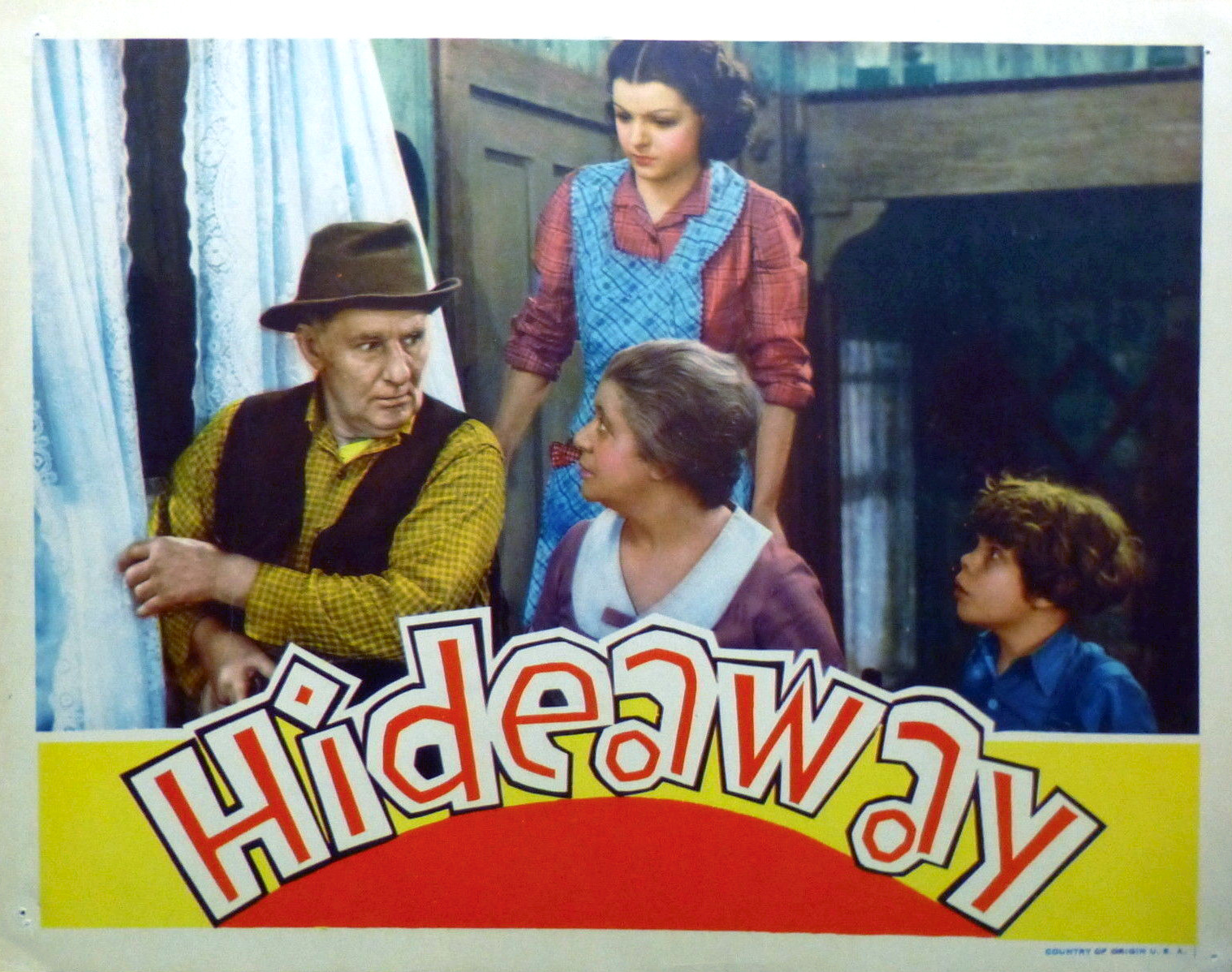
- Lobby card
- Directed by: Richard Rosson; Doran Cox (assistant)
- Screenplay by: J. Robert Bren; Edmund L. Hartmann
- Based on: A House in the Country by Melvin Levy
- Produced by: Cliff Reid
- Starring: Fred Stone; Emma Dunn; Marjorie Lord; J. Carrol Naish
- Cinematography: Jack MacKenzie
- Edited by: Henry Berman
- Production company: RKO Radio Pictures
- Release date: August 13, 1937 (US)
- Running time: 60 minutes
- Country: United States
- Language: English

Hideaway is a 1937 American comedy film directed by Richard Rosson. Based on the 1937 play A House in the Country by Melvin Levy, the screenplay was written by J. Robert Bren and Edmund L. Hartmann. Produced and distributed by RKO Radio Pictures, it opened on August 13, 1937. The film stars Fred Stone, Emma Dunn, Marjorie Lord and J. Carroll Naish.

== Plot ==
In the mid-1930s, the Peterson family is squatting in a vacant house owned by Mike Clarke, whom they have never met. Forestry ranger, Bill Parker, wants to marry Joan Peterson, but Joan wants to pursue life in New York. Joan's father, Franklin (“Frankie”) supports Bill's intentions, but her mother, Emma, supports her desire to move away. The Petersons also have young son, Oscar.

In town, Frankie gives a stranger false directions to the “Mike Clarke house” afraid they will be evicted. However, the stranger is Mike Clarke, posing under the alias “John Knox.” He and his gang, Miller and Baxter, have committed murder and robbery, and want to hideout at Clarke's house. Finding the house, and to avoid suspicion, Clarke offers to pay the Petersons a nominal fee for lodging, posing with his gang as “hunters” to explain their firearms. Frankie invites several townspeople to the house for a party in honor of his guests. Bill Parker arrives and competes for the affection of Joan, who is attracted to Miller after he promises to help her if she goes to New York. The tension between Bill and Miller, along with the various antics of the Petersons, including Oscar's pranks, challenge Clarke and his gang to not blow their cover.

Clarke offers Frankie $100 to go to New York to assist him with a “real estate deal.” Joan goes too. Clarke is actually using Frankie to get a message to his contact, Jerry Nolan. After Frankie is paid for the job, a disgruntled Joan wants to go home. Frankie finds Clarke's New York house hoping to negotiate with Clarke for the purchase of the house where the Petersons have been living. Rival gang leader, Norris, questions Frankie about his interest in Clarke and learns Clarke and his gang are in the Peterson house. Frankie returns home and tells Clarke about his encounter with Norris. Clarke and his gang hurriedly leave for Mexico, but Norris and his gang intercept them, fatally shooting Clarke. Clarke reveals his true identity to Frankie before dying. Frankie and Bill return to the house which has been breached by Norris. Frankie inadvertently shoots and kills Norris, and the rest of the gang is subdued. When Frankie is honored at a ceremony for his heroism, he is seen sleeping under a tree with his rifle, reflecting the film's opening scene.

== Cast ==
- Fred Stone as Franklin Peterson
- Emma Dunn as Emma Peterson
- Marjorie Lord as Joan Peterson
- J. Carrol Naish as Mike Clarke
- William Corson as Bill Parker
- Ray Mayer as Eddie Baxter
- Bradley Page as Al Miller
- Paul Guilfoyle as Norris
- Tommy Bond as Oscar Peterson
- Dudley Clements as Sheriff Roscoe W. Wiggins
- Alec Craig as Jerry Nolan
- Charles Withers as Yokum
- Otto Hoffman as Hank
- Bob McKenzie as Walter Mooney

== Critical reception ==
Harrison's Reports described the film as "average program fare" and noted that it lacked "box office names of value." It commented that "the story is silly and, except for a few spurts of comedy ... somewhat boresome."

Motion Picture Herald wrote "the film isn't a masterpiece", but commented, "With comedy as the keynote, the story is a combination of formula standbys — a bit of romance, contrasting light melodrama, suspense, surprising twists and a thrill-action anti-climax. There are several good characterizations, and dialogue, action and situations are well blended."

Variety gave a negative review and wrote, "They don't come as bad as this one very often ... It's third rate in every respect." The reviewer commented that the film "deserved the rough treatment" given by the preview audience, and wrote that the stars, Fred Stone and Emma Dunn, "are entitled to something better than this trashy, incredible and irritating story."
