= Underground Agent =

1942 film by Michael Gordon

- Theatrical release poster
- Directed by: Michael Gordon
- Written by: J. Robert Bren, Gladys Atwater
- Produced by: Sam White
- Starring: Bruce Bennett, Leslie Brooks, Frank Albertson, Julian Rivero
- Cinematography: L. William O'Connell
- Edited by: Arthur Seid
- Distributed by: Columbia Pictures
- Release date: December 3, 1942
- Running time: 66 minutes
- Country: United States
- Language: English

Underground Agent is a 1942 American drama film directed by Michael Gordon and starring Bruce Bennett, Leslie Brooks, Frank Albertson, and Julian Rivero. The film was released by Columbia Pictures.

== Plot ==
Two U.S. government agents (Bruce Bennett and Frank Albertson) are assigned to prevent Nazi spies involved in an eavesdropping scheme from infiltrating into a Southern California war-defense plant. To help them in their venture, one of the agents invents an ingenious word-scrambler that eventually leads them to the German spies.

== Cast ==
- Bruce Bennett as Lee Graham
- Leslie Brooks as Ann Carter
- Frank Albertson as Johnny Davis
- Julian Rivero as Miguel Gonzales
- George McKay as Pete Dugan
- Rhys Williams as Henry Miller
- Henry Victor as Johann Schrode
- Addison Richards as George Martin
- Rosina Galli as Maria Gonzales
- Leonard Strong as Count Akiri
- Hans Conried as Hugo
