= Poor Mrs. Jones! =

Poor Mrs. Jones
- Directed by: Raymond Evans
- Written by: Grace Frysinger
- Cinematography: Eugene Tucker
- Music by: Martin Marks
- Production company: United States Department of Agriculture
- Release date: 1926
- Running time: 46 minutes
- Country: United States
- Languages: Silent, English intertitles

Poor Mrs. Jones (1926) is a 46-minute, black-and-white comedy, drama and family silent film produced by the United States Department of Agriculture in 1925 and released in 1926. It was directed by Raymond Evans, a former newspaperman. Shot on location in Washington, DC and at a farm in Maryland, the film features Gone with the Wind actress Leona Roberts as Jane Jones, a 1920s rural housewife tired of a grueling and unglamorous day-to-day life. She takes a vacation to the city where she stays with her sister Hattie, played by Maud Howell Smith. The USDA produced this film as 1920s propaganda promoting agriculture and farm life as more virtuous and wholesome than life in the city.

New York Times film critic Dave Kehr notes:

"[F]rom a purely artistic point of view, the discovery of this round is "Poor Mrs. Jones!", a government propaganda film [that] makes use of the stubbornly unsentimental realism pioneered by the Scandinavian filmmakers of the 1910s to teach a simple lesson: Farm life may be grim and oppressive, but city life is infinitely worse. Even within the government bureaucracy, it seems, there were artists struggling to express themselves, and in this case with skill and vision."

"Poor Mrs. Jones!" has been curated as part of "Treasures III: Social Issues in American Film 1900–1934", a well-researched, annotated collection of rare films from national film archives. It catalogs issues most concerning to America in the first three decades of the 20th century.

Social Issues in American Film 1900–1934 Film curator Glenn Erickson considers "Poor Mrs Jones! "practically [a] work of art..."beautifully made on all counts."

== Plot ==
Mrs. Lane Jones is seen working around her Maryland farm she owns with her husband, John Jones. As she works, things seem to go poorly for her. As she irons the clothes, the electricity goes out. As she walks to the shed where the generator is located, she chases the chicken from the garden. Discovering that there is no gasoline for the generator, Lane drains the car, chases the chicken, puts the gasoline in the generator, starts it, chases the chicken again, discovers that the bread she was baking has burnt, so it's ham and eggs for dinner again!

Frustrated, Mrs. Jones gives up and demands that her John sells the farm and move into town. Her sister Hattie's husband has a job in the city that pays $2000 a year, five times what the Jones' earns on the farm. As a compromise, John suggests that Lane spend a few weeks in town with her sister Hattie to take a break from grueling farm work.

Lane arrives at her sister Hattie's home. Although Hattie and her husband makes more money, they live in a very small apartment. Lane realizes that the grass in town isn't nearly as greener as life on the farm. Lane finally returns home and accepts how great life is on the family farm versus city life.

== Cast and Crew ==
- Raymond Evans – Director
- Grace Frysinger – Writer
- Martin Marks – Music
- Eugene Tucker – Cinematography
- Leona Roberts – Lane Jones
- Walter Beck – John Jones
- Maud Howell Smith – Hattie – Jane's sister
- Arthur J. Rhodes – Hattie's husband
