= The Man Who Found Himself =

1937 film by Lew Landers

- Original theatrical poster
- Directed by: Lew Landers
- Screenplay by: J. Robert Bren; Edmund L. Hartmann; Gladys Atwater; Thomas Lennon
- Based on: Wings of Mercy by Alice B. Curtis
- Produced by: Cliff Reid
- Starring: John Beal; Joan Fontaine; Philip Huston
- Cinematography: J. Roy Hunt
- Edited by: Jack Hively
- Music by: Max Steiner (uncredited)
- Production company: RKO Radio Pictures
- Distributed by: RKO Radio Pictures
- Release date: April 2, 1937
- Running time: 67 minutes
- Country: United States
- Language: English

The Man Who Found Himself, also known as Wings of Mercy, is a 1937 American aviation film based on the unpublished story "Wings of Mercy" by Alice B. Curtis. The film marked the first starring role for 19-year-old Joan Fontaine, who was billed as the "new RKO screen personality", highlighted following the end of the film by a special "on screen" introduction. Unlike many of the period films that appeared to glorify aviation, it is a complex film, examining the motivations of both doctors and pilots.

== Plot ==
Young doctor Jim Stanton has two passionate interests in conflict with each other. He is first a conscientious surgeon, but in his spare time, pursues his love of flying, a dangerous hobby that his well-intentioned father abhors. His father is a well-regarded doctor who does his best to curtail his son's flying.

When Jim crashes, his passenger, a married woman is killed. The resulting scandal prompts the hospital to put him on probation. Believing that he is innocent and wronged, Jim becomes a hobo and is arrested for vagrancy and put to work on a road crew in Los Angeles. He runs into an old pal, Dick Miller, who persuades him to take a job as a mechanic for Roberts Aviation.

On an emergency flight that turns out to be less than routine, nurse Doris King becomes suspicious of the new employee who not only can handle the controls of an aircraft, but also knows what to do in a medical emergency. Doris finds out the truth about Jim from an inquisitive newspaper reporter, "Nosey" Watson. She persuaded the company's boss to make Jim the pilot of the "aerial ambulance" airplane.

Jim reaches a train crash ahead of other doctors, to find his injured father (a passenger, along with Doris) operating on a patient. Jim steps in to help out.

== Cast ==
- John Beal as Dr. James Stanton Jr.
- Joan Fontaine as Nurse Doris King
- Phillip Huston as Richard "Dick" Miller
- Jane Walsh as Barbara Reed
- George Irving as Dr. James Stanton Sr.
- Jimmy Conlin as "Nosey" Watson
- Frank M. Thomas as Mr. Roberts
- Diana Gibson as Helen Richards
- Dwight Frye as Hysterical patient
- Billy Gilbert as Hobo

== Production ==
A Lockheed Model 10 Electra configured as an ambulance aircraft appeared prominently in the film.

Although Joan Fontaine, on contract with RKO, had already made her screen appearance in No More Ladies (1935), A Million to One (1937) and Quality Street (1937), opposite Katharine Hepburn (Note: In a modern interview, Fontaine reported that Katharine Hepburn, with whom she had appeared in a small role in Quality Street had recommended her to a "B" movie producer on the RKO lot for the part of "Doris".), the studio considered her a rising star, and touted The Man Who Found Himself as her first starring role. A unique "photo-play"-style introduction was placed after the end credit.

The Man Who Found Himself featured a number of Lockheed Model 10 Electras, a Ford Trimotor, and other aircraft, while a Waco also served as a camera plane for the aerial sequences. Prolific director Lew Landers, who had gained a reputation for bringing projects in on time and budget, began the production January 12, 1937 and wrapped up principal photography by February 1937. In 1937 alone, Landers also completed Danger Patrol, Living on Love, Border Cafe, You Can't Buy Luck, They Wanted to Marry and Flight from Glory (another aviation-oriented film).

AFI Catalog lists the source material as a story by Alice F. Curtis but Motion Picture Herald credits Alice B. Curtis.

== Reception ==
The Man Who Found Himself received mixed reviews ranging from a caustic comment in The New York Times – "The only thing the industry could possibly do now ... is to administer anesthetic to the audience" – to flattering mentions of the rising new star, Joan Fontaine. Kate Cameron's comment in the New York Daily News was that "Miss Fontaine is as blonde as Miss [Olivia] de Havilland is dark, but she has the same charm and poise which makes her sister one of the most promising younger actresses in Hollywood."
