= Racing Lady =

1937 film by Wallace Fox

- Directed by: Wallace Fox; Syd Fogel (assistant)
- Screenplay by: Dorothy Yost; Thomas Lennon; Cortland Fitzsimmons
- Story by: Damon Runyon; J. Robert Bren; Norman Houston
- Produced by: Samuel J. Briskin; William Sistrom (associate)
- Starring: Ann Dvorak; Smith Ballew; Harry Carey
- Cinematography: Harry Wild
- Edited by: James Morley
- Music by: Roy Webb
- Production company: RKO Radio Pictures
- Distributed by: RKO Radio Pictures
- Release dates: January 12, 1937 (Premiere-New York City); January 29, 1937 (US)
- Running time: 59 minutes
- Country: United States
- Language: English

Racing Lady is a 1937 American drama film produced by RKO Radio Pictures, which premiered in New York City on January 12, 1937, and was released nationally on January 29. Directed by Wallace Fox, the screenplay was written by Dorothy Yost, Thomas Lennon, and Cortland Fitzsimmons, based on a story by Damon Runyon, which had been further expanded by J. Robert Bren and Norman Houston.

While more than 25 of Runyon's stories and novels have been used as the basis for films, this was one of only two films (the other being George White's 1935 Scandals) in which Runyon was directly involved with the story, it being based on his unpublished work "All Scarlet." The film stars Ann Dvorak, Smith Ballew, and Harry Carey.

== Plot ==
Longtime thoroughbred breeder and trainer Tom Martin has a mare, Pepper Mary, he's about to enter in a big race. After the owner of another contender fails to bribe Tom to lose on purpose, his jockey causes Pepper Mary to stumble and fall during the race, causing a career-ending injury to the horse.

Tom's disappointed daughter Ruth concentrates all her efforts on Pepper Mary's filly, Katydid, hoping she, too, can become an outstanding racehorse. Steve Wendel, an automobile mogul who has a stable of horses, buys the victorious horse after Ruth enters her in a Santa Anita claiming race.

To stay with her horse, Ruth reluctantly accepts Steve's offer to come work for him. They travel the racing circuit abroad, where Ruth matures from a tomboy into a sophisticated young woman. She falls in love with Steve, and after a misunderstanding over the disappearance of Katydid before a race, they celebrate as their horse races to another triumph.

== Cast ==
- Ann Dvorak as Ruth Martin
- Smith Ballew as Steve Wendel
- Harry Carey as Tom Martin
- Berton Churchill as Judge
- Frank M. Thomas as Bradford
- Ray Mayer as Warbler
- Willie Best as Brass
- Hattie McDaniel as Abby
- Harry Jans as Lewis
- Lew Payton as Joe
- Harlan Tucker as Gilbert
- Alex Hill as Johnny

== See also ==
- List of films about horses
- List of films about horse racing
