= The Treasure of Pancho Villa =

1955 film by George Sherman

- Original film poster
- Directed by: George Sherman
- Written by: J. Robert Bren
- Story by: Gladys Atwater
- Produced by: Edmund Grainger
- Starring: Rory Calhoun; Shelley Winters; Gilbert Roland
- Cinematography: William E. Snyder
- Edited by: Harry Marker
- Music by: Leith Stevens
- Production company: Edmund Grainger Productions
- Distributed by: RKO Radio Pictures
- Release date: October 19, 1955 (U.S.)
- Running time: 92 minutes
- Country: United States
- Language: English
- Box office: $1.15 million (U.S.)

The Treasure of Pancho Villa is a 1955 American Western film directed by George Sherman and starring Rory Calhoun, Shelley Winters, and Gilbert Roland. Set during the Mexican Revolution, the film follows an American mercenary (Calhoun) who joins the cause of Pancho Villa's forces. It was released by RKO Radio Pictures on October 19, 1955.

== Plot ==
During the Mexican Civil War of 1913, mercenary Tom Bryan and his Lewis machine gun he names ("La Cucaracha") joins a band of revolutionaries headed by Colonel Juan Castro. Though paid for his services, Bryan is tired of the squalid life he is living in Mexico and is considering offering his services to Cuba.

Bryan is offered one more highly paid job. Castro is planning an assault and robbery of train carrying a vast amount of gold belonging to the central government. Because of the strength of the escort of Federales on two trains, one carrying an artillery piece on a flat car, his men are dubious of success. Castro has two aces up his sleeve; Bryan with his machine gun, who will be disguised as a passenger on the train, and Pablo Morales, an expert dynamiter, who will blow up a bridge separating the two trains. Castro senses treachery by Morales as the two did a robbery years ago with Castro leaving Morales behind, however Castro is reassured by Morales' wife that he is a Villista and is not a traitor.

After wiping out the Federales, they steal the gold shipment from the government train, gold that Castro intends to deliver to revolutionary leader Pancho Villa. Pursued by the Mexican Army, they flee to the mountains along with Ruth Harris an American who was living in Mexico as a schoolteacher but who became a soldadera after her father was murdered. Villa and his men do not appear at the rendezvous; however, Morales gains the loyalty of some of Castro's band to keep the gold for themselves. Bryan also wants the gold for himself, wishing to use it to finance his own revolution in another country where he can loot the nation and retire in splendor. He guns down most of the Mexicans with his Lewis gun in order to keep the gold.

Morales, Ruth and the others are captured by the Federales, with Morales offering them the gold, Bryan, and Castro in exchange for money and amnesty. Because of her American nationality, Ruth is escorted to Tampico to be deported to America, while the others are to be executed.

Tracked by Yaqui Indians working with the government pursuers, Bryan is reconciled to Castro's ideals, and the two build a gun emplacement out of the bags of gold to make a last stand. The Federales send Morales with a white flag of truce and a hand grenade, but Castro kills him first. Castro is killed by the pursuing Mexicans and Bryan has to blow up the gold in order to prevent them recovering it. This starts an avalanche that buries both the gold and the pursuers. Unarmed and broke, the solitary Bryan makes his way to Tampico to be reunited with Ruth.

As Bryan leaves the place where he has buried Castro, he looks up at the vultures circling and tells them that they have feasted on many things but if they should ever have done so on Castro, they would have feasted on a real man.

== Cast ==
- Rory Calhoun as Tom Bryan
- Shelley Winters as Ruth Harris
- Gilbert Roland as Juan Castro
- Joseph Calleia as Pablo Morales
- Fanny Schiller as Laria Morales
- Carlos Múzquiz as Commandant
- Tony Carbajal as Farolito
- Pasquel Pena as Ricardo
- Jorge Martínez de Hoyos as Revolutionary
- Rodd Redwing as Yaqui tracker

== Production ==
The Treasure of Pancho Villa was shot on location in Cuernevaca and Taxco, Mexico, and at Estudios Churubusco. Van Johnson was originally cast as Tom Bryan, but was replaced by Rory Calhoun before filming began.

== See also ==
- List of American films of 1955
