= Crime Ring (film) =

1938 American crime drama film directed by Leslie Goodwins

- Theatrical poster for film
- Directed by: Leslie Goodwins
- Screenplay by: J. Robert Bren; Gladys Atwater
- Story by: Reginald Taviner
- Produced by: Cliff Reid
- Starring: Allan Lane; Frances Mercer
- Cinematography: Jack MacKenzie
- Edited by: Desmond Marquette
- Music by: Roy Webb
- Production company: RKO Radio Pictures
- Release date: July 8, 1938 (US)
- Running time: 70 minutes
- Country: United States
- Language: English

Crime Ring is a 1938 American crime drama film directed by Leslie Goodwins from a screenplay by J. Robert Bren and Gladys Atwater, based on a story by Reginald Taviner. The film stars Allan Lane and Frances Mercer, and was produced and distributed by RKO Radio Pictures, released on July 8, 1938.

== Plot ==
A ring of phony fortune tellers, led by Marvin, "the sightless seer" is in league with racketeers to defraud wealthy clients. Joe Ryan, a reporter, and Judy Allen, an actress agree to help the police by going undercover to expose the ring. Judy poses as a fortune teller, with the help of her friend, Kitty, who is a ventriloquist. While Ryan and Kitty are setting up the trap, Ryan's rich friend, Phoebe Sawyer is duped by Marvin, who along with Lionel Whitmore, a personal finance manager, and Ray Taylor, an attorney. They set her up to take a long voyage, while they forge her name on a power of attorney and steal her fortune.

While Phoebe is falling Marvin's ploy, Ryan has successfully convinced the racketeering ring that he has been duped by Judy, and has the goods on them. Smelling a trap, the gangster Jenner has Ryan picked up to be "taken for a ride", by his two fellow gangsters, Dummy and Slim. Ryan is rescued by the police, who were sent by the assistant district attorney, Tom Redwine.

Whitmore has Marvin killed, believing that Phoebe has left the country, and puts the plan to liquidate her assets in motion. In order to entrap Whitmore, Redwine has Dummy and slim released, who then, with the help of Phoebe, confronts and arrests Taylor. Hoping to escape, Whitmore kidnaps Judy and Kitty to use as a shield. However, the two girls are rescued by Joe and Redwine, along with the police.

== Cast ==
- Allan Lane as Joe Ryan
- Frances Mercer as Judy Allen
- Clara Blandick as Phoebe Sawyer
- Inez Courtney as Kitty
- Bradley Page as Lionel Whitmore
- Ben Welden as Nate
- Walter Miller as Jenner
- Frank M. Thomas as Thomas Redwine
- Jack Arnold as Buzzell
- Morgan Conway as Ray Taylor
- George Irving as Clifton
- Leona Roberts as Mrs. Wharton
- Charles Trowbridge as Marvin
- Tom Kennedy as Dummy
- Paul Fix as Slim
- Jack Mulhall as Brady

(Cast list as per AFI database

== Production ==
The working title for the movie was Cheating the Stars. Les Goodwins had been directing comedy shorts prior to this picture, which marked his directorial debut on a feature film. The film was shot partially at RKO's Encino property in the San Fernando Valley. In June 1938 it was announced that Jack MacKenzie would handle the photography on the picture. At the beginning of June, the release date was announced as July 8. The picture finished filming by mid-May, one day ahead of schedule, and was being edited by the end of the month. As of June 24, the film was still being edited. When the film was released on July 8, it was the 38th picture released by RKO in 1938. The National Legion of Decency rated the film class A-1, making it suitable for general patronage.

== Reception ==
MacKenzie's was said to have done "...an excellent job on photography." The Film Daily said the film was "fast moving" with "plenty of action." They complimented the acting, and felt the plot was well thought out. Harrison's Reports gave the film an average review, calling it a fair melodrama, but finding the plot a bit implausible. The magazine did feel that the film maintained its level of suspense. The Motion Picture Herald enjoyed the film, calling it topical and promising.
