= First Yank into Tokyo =

1945 film by Gordon Douglas

- Original film poster
- Directed by: Gordon Douglas
- Screenplay by: J. Robert Bren
- Story by: Gladys Atwater; J. Robert Bren
- Produced by: J. Robert Bren
- Starring: Tom Neal; Keye Luke; Barbara Hale; Richard Loo
- Cinematography: Harry J. Wild
- Edited by: Philip Martin Jr.
- Music by: Leigh Harline
- Production company: RKO Radio Pictures
- Distributed by: RKO Radio Pictures
- Release date: September 11, 1945
- Running time: 82 minutes
- Country: United States
- Language: English

First Yank into Tokyo is a 1945 American war film directed by Gordon Douglas for RKO Radio Pictures, starring Tom Neal, Keye Luke, Barbara Hale, and Richard Loo. It was one of the last American films to be produced during World War II, released only a little over a month after the bombing of Hiroshima and Nagasaki and the official surrender of Japan. Notably, it's also the first-ever film to feature or reference the atomic bombings.

== Plot ==
After staging a successful bombing raid on Tokyo, Air Force pilot Steve Ross returns to San Francisco, where he reminisces about his lost love, army nurse Abby Drake, who he believes perished while on duty in Bataan. Steve's leave is curtailed when he is ordered to report to Washington and asked to volunteer for a special mission. Because Steve was reared in Japan and is fluent in the language, the army proposes that he undergo plastic surgery to become a "Japanese" so that he can infiltrate the army and contact scientist Lewis Jardine, a prisoner of war who possesses the formula to build an atomic bomb. Steve accepts the mission and after the surgery is sent to a city near Hong Kong, where he becomes known as Tomu Takishima, a Japanese soldier who is being shipped back to Japan after being discharged for battle shock. As Steve's ship nears Tokyo, he jumps overboard and, after swimming ashore, walks to the Kamuri concentration camp, where Jardine is being held prisoner.

At the camp, Steve is assigned to work at the supply depot and there meets Haan-Soo, a Korean errand boy who is a member of the underground working with the U.S. When Haan-Soo tells Steve that Jardine has been hospitalized with black fever, Steve gets himself reassigned to the hospital by bribing Major Nogira, the medical director who has been pilfering hospital supplies. Steve's assignment must be approved by Colonel Hideko Okanura, the perceptive camp commander, who was also Steve's college roommate. Okanura fails to recognize his old roommate, but is certain that he has met the new soldier somewhere before. At the supply room, Steve encounters Abby, who has been captured by the Japanese and assigned the position of head nurse at the hospital.

When Jardine, who has been working at the munitions plant, returns to the hospital that night, Steve contacts him. At first Jardine doubts that the Japanese soldier is really an American agent, but Steve convinces him. Soon after, Okunura makes an advance toward Abby, and when she rejects him, he takes revenge on Nogira, who has also tried to seduce the nurse. Accusing Nogiea of larceny, Okanura demotes him and then orders him to commit suicide. After Nogiea complies, Okanura accuses the nurses of his murder and orders Abby to report to his office. There, Okunura again tries to seduce Abby but is interrupted when Steve arrives with proof of Nogiea's suicide, thus freeing Abby to leave. Okanura orders Steve whipped for his insubordination, and as Abby tends to his wounds, she experiences confusing emotions toward him.

Later, Steve confesses to Jardine that he and Abby were engaged and the pilot's wings she wears are his. Although the plan had been for Jardine to transmit the data to Steve, Steve decides that he, Abby and Jardine must all escape quickly before the tenacious Okanura uncovers his identity. An escape plan is devised for that night, but when Haan-Soo learns that Okunura has sent for “Takishima’s” supposed former commander to verify his identity, Jardine suggests setting an explosion at the munitions factory as a diversion. As Haan-Soo leaves for the plant, Okanura summons Abby to a party at his house.

Under the ruse of delivering an officer to the party, Steve drives to the commander's house with Jardine hidden in the backseat of the car. At the house, Okanura has sequestered Abby in a room and is about to rape her when he sees Steve being chased across the lawn by a watchdog. Recognizing Steve as his old roommate by the way he sprints, Okanura exposes him to the assembled officers and is about to kill him when the munitions plant explodes, throwing Okanura and the others to the floor.

After strangling Okanura, Steve rescues Abby and reveals his true identity to her. With the officers in pursuit, Steve, Abby and Jardine flee to the beach, where they are to be rescued by a boat. There, they are met by Haan-Soo, who joins Steve in holding off the soldiers while Abby and Jardine sail to safety. Steve and Haan-Soo's sacrifice allows for the development and deployment of the atomic bomb, assuring that "mankind can walk unafraid in peace with goodwill toward men."

== Cast ==
- Tom Neal as Major Steve Ross / Sergeant Tomu Takashima
- Barbara Hale as Abby Drake
- Keye Luke as Haan-Soo
- Richard Loo as Colonel Hideko Okanura
- Marc Cramer as Dr. Lewis Jardine
- Leonard Strong as Major Nogira
- Benson Fong as Captain Tanahe
- Clarence Lung as Major Ichibo
- Keye Chang as Captain Sato
- Michael St. Angel as Captain Andrew Kent
- Peter Chong as Dr. Kai Koon
- Edwin Luke as Ling Wang
- Wallis Clark as Dr. Langley
- John Hamilton as Dr. Stacey
- Kenneth MacDonald as Colonel Thompson
- Selmer Jackson as Colonel Blaine
- Ione Reed as Nurse
- Robert Clarke as Narrator

== History ==
Originally the film centered on Ross helping to acquire a new kind of gun. The atomic bomb attacks on Hiroshima and Nagasaki occurred during production of the film; the producers subsequently altered the plotline.
