= El Paso (film) =

1949 film

- Directed by: Lewis R. Foster
- Screenplay by: Lewis R. Foster
- Story by: J. Robert Bren; Gladys Atwater
- Produced by: William H. Pine; William C. Thomas
- Starring: John Payne; Gail Russell; Sterling Hayden
- Cinematography: Ellis W. Carter
- Edited by: Howard A. Smith
- Music by: Darrell Calker
- Color process: Cinecolor
- Production company: Pine-Thomas Productions
- Distributed by: Paramount Pictures
- Release date: March 23, 1949 (New York)
- Running time: 103 minutes
- Country: United States
- Language: English
- Budget: $1 million
- Box office: $1.7 million

El Paso is a 1949 American Western film directed by Lewis R. Foster and starring John Payne, Gail Russell and Sterling Hayden.

== Plot ==
Clay Fletcher, lawyer and returned Civil War Confederate officer, feels he needs to ease back into his legal career; he takes an assignment to travel west from his home state of South Carolina to a "frontier settlement called El Paso", in Texas. His mission involves obtaining the signature on estate documents of attorney Henry Jeffers, whom Clay knows by reputation. He also knows, and is very fond of, Jeffers' daughter, Susan.

Along the way, he meets a pots-and-pans peddler named Pesky and a con-woman, Stagecoach Nellie, who steals his wallet. In a saloon in El Paso, Clay witnesses a sham trial; a man is convicted of murder by a drunken judge, who turns out to be Jeffers. When Clay speaks up on the defendant's behalf, he is charged with contempt of court. Unable to pay the fine, his fancy clothing is auctioned off.

Clay is rescued by rancher Nacho Vazquez, who offers him a place to stay. He also gets reacquainted with Susan, who owns a hat shop. Clay learns the man found guilty of murder was framed by rich, shady land owner Bert Donner and his stooge, Sheriff La Farge.

La Farge brutally beats rancher John Elkins, who has tried to stand up for his rights after discovering that Donner and his crowd, including the sheriff, are going to foreclose on him as they have many other landowners in the area. Clay and Elkins served together during the war and the former Captain Clay Fletcher is disturbed that such a thing would happen to someone who had gone into tax arrears only because he was away fighting in the war in the service of his home state of Texas.

After Clay takes Elkins and his wife home, the gang of men led by Donner and La Farge arrive to foreclose. Clay pleads his friend's case but the men storm further onto the property to drive the Elkins' off the land; after warning them that he will do so, in self-defense Elkins fires his gun and kills a deputy.

The rancher is charged with murder and Clay volunteers to represent him. La Farge tries to have him killed. Clay has Pesky take the judge out of town to sober him up and ensure he stays away from liquor. By the time of the trial and in spite of Donner and his crew making one final attempt to get him to drink before the trial, Jeffers remains sober. He clears Elkins of any wrongdoing. Subsequently, Judge Jeffers is dragged behind a horse and killed; Elkins and his wife are also soon after found murdered.

Vowing revenge, Clay forms an outfit of vigilantes to set things right. But in so doing, he is warned by Susan that he is becoming as ruthless as the men he's after. Donner ends up dead and La Farge is set to be lynched when Clay comes to his senses and asks that El Paso's next judge be the one to hand out justice.

== Cast ==
- John Payne as Clay Fletcher
- Gail Russell as Susan Jeffers
- Sterling Hayden as Bert Donner
- George 'Gabby' Hayes as Pesky (Pescaloosa) Tees
- Dick Foran as Sheriff La Farge
- Eduardo Noriega as Don Nacho Vázquez
- Henry Hull as Judge Henry Jeffers
- Mary Beth Hughes as Stagecoach Nellie
- H. B. Warner as Judge Fletcher
- Bobby Ellis as Jack Elkins
- Catherine Craig as Mrs. Elkins
- Arthur Space as John Elkins
- Steven Geray as Mexican Joe
- Denver Pyle as uncredited vigilante

== Production ==
The film was based on a story by J. Robert Bren and Gladys Atwater. In July 1947 it was purchased by Pine-Thomas Productions who had just made another Western named after a town in the Southwest, Albuquerque (1948). The story was going to depict the real-life Judge Colt. William Holden was originally mentioned as the possible lead.

The film was the first million-dollar-budgeted movie from Pine-Thomas Productions, who had specialised in low budget action films. They had recently increased their budgets because they felt the movies were more profitable that way.

"We've got people working in this one who two years ago wouldn't have been caught dead in a Pine-Thomas picture," said producer Will Thomas. He added, "in the old days, all we had to do was get a guy blown up in an oil well explosion and go from there, but now, when we want to kill someone, we've got to have a good reason."

Filming started October 1948. Some exterior shots were filmed in El Paso, Texas. Other scenes were shot in Gallup, Arizona, Nevada, and at ranches in the San Fernando Valley.

== Reception ==
The film was an "okay" box office success, earning $2 million. The New York Times thought that despite the increased budget the film found Pine and Thomas "still in the same low budget groove". The film started a long relationship between Payne and Pine-Thomas.

== See also ==
- Sterling Hayden filmography
