= Beauty for the Asking =

1939 film by Glenn Tryon

- Directed by: Glenn Tryon
- Written by: Doris Anderson and Paul Jarrico (screenplay); Edmund L. Hartmann (story); Grace Norton and Adele Buffington (idea)
- Produced by: B. P. Fineman
- Starring: Lucille Ball; Patric Knowles; Donald Woods; Frieda Inescort
- Cinematography: Frank Redman
- Edited by: George Crone
- Music by: Roy Webb
- Production company: RKO Pictures
- Release date: February 24, 1939
- Running time: 68 minutes
- Country: United States
- Language: English

Beauty for the Asking is a 1939 film drama produced by RKO Pictures, and starring Lucille Ball and Patric Knowles.

== Plot ==
Jean Russell is a beautician who is jilted by her boyfriend so he can marry an older but wealthy woman. Russell invents a new facial cream, and with the financial backing of her former boyfriend's wife, starts a business that makes her a millionaire.

== Cast ==
- Lucille Ball as Jean Russell
- Patric Knowles as Denny Williams
- Donald Woods as Jeffrey Martin
- Frieda Inescort as Flora Barton-Williams
- Inez Courtney as Gwen Morrison
- Leona Maricle as Eve Harrington
- Frances Mercer as Patricia Wharton
- Whitney Bourne as Peggy Ponsby
- George Beranger as Cyril (as George Andre Beranger)
- Kay Sutton as Miss Whitman, Jean's Secretary
- Ann Evers as Lois Peabody

== Reception ==
RKO's pre-release publicity claimed that the film was to be an "exposé of the beauty racket" but reviewers of the day concluded that it was a standard "romantic love triangle".

Leonard Maltin has written favorably of the film, suggesting that the film offered an unusual feminist viewpoint for its time, and acknowledging that Ball delivered a strong performance.

== Bibliography ==
- Jewell, Richard B. and Harbin, Vernon, The RKO Story, Octopus Books, London, 1982. ISBN 0-7064-1285-0
- Maltin, Leonard, Leonard Maltin's 1998 Movie & Video Guide, Signet Books, 1997. ISBN 0-451-19288-5
