= Overland Pacific =

1954 film by Fred F. Sears

- Theatrical release poster
- Directed by: Fred F. Sears
- Screenplay by: J. Robert Bren; Gladys Atwater; Martin Goldsmith
- Story by: Frederick Louis Fox
- Starring: Jock Mahoney; Peggie Castle; Adele Jergens
- Cinematography: Lester White
- Edited by: Buddy Small
- Music by: Irving Gertz
- Production companies: Superior Pictures Inc. World Films, Inc.
- Distributed by: United Artists
- Release date: February 27, 1954
- Running time: 73 minutes
- Country: United States
- Language: English

Overland Pacific is a 1954 American color Western film directed by Fred F. Sears and starring Jock Mahoney, Peggie Castle and Adele Jergens.

== Plot ==
Ross Granger practices sending telegraphs noisily while sharing a stagecoach with an uninterested man and an irate woman. The coach halts at a telegraph pole adorned with a worker who has an arrow in his back. They place the worker's body on top of the coach, but it falls off before they reach Oaktown. Granger has a fistfight with the driver over the loss and sends him back to retrieve the body.

At the Silver Dollar Saloon he meets his old friend from the Civil War: Del Stewart. Del invites him to dinner with him and his girlfriend Ann and they reminisce.

Outside town men are laying a new railroad track for Overland Pacific when they are attacked by Comanche Indians armed with bow and arrows and rifles. There is also suspicion of sabotage.

Del is engaged to Ann Dennison, whose father runs the railroad. Del goes out to see the father who is surveying the land. Del tries to persuade the father to detour the railway to go through Oaktown, but he resists. Del's partner arrives and shoots the father dead. The killer and Del attend the funeral.

Granger starts work as a telegraph operator but it is thought he is an impostor. The sheriff goes out to warn Granger that trouble is brewing. The sheriff shows where the Comanche have rifles hidden. An ambush is waiting from Jason. Granger suspects this but is shot in the chest, but manages to kill Jason. The sheriff is revealed as being sided with the other side and draws his gun on Granger. Granger collapses before he is shot.

Granger revives in town. He knows now Jason killed Mr Dennison. Del is revealed as hiring the Comanche to attack the railroad workers.

A jealous Jessie Lorraine, his dance-hall girl, loves Del as well. Del and his cohorts are secretly selling repeater rifles to Chief Dark Thunder and the Comanche Indians, who do not want the railroad crossing their land. Del and rancher Broden want the Overland Pacific to re-route through Oaktown, where they own property.

A hired gun and corrupt sheriff both end up dead. Ann breaks off her engagement upon learning Del's scheme, pleasing Jessie until she discovers the true nature of Del, then is shot by him. It is left to Granger to win a shootout with Del, after which he and Ann commence a romance.

== Cast ==
- Jock Mahoney as Granger
- Peggie Castle as Ann Dennison
- William Bishop as Del Stewart
- Adele Jergens as Jessie
- Pat Hogan as Dark Thunder, leader of the Comanche
- Chris Alcaide as Jason, Del's hired gun
- Chubby Johnson as Sheriff Blaney
- Walter Sande as Mr Dennison
- House Peters Jr. as Perkins
- Fred Graham as Jenks the stage driver

== Production ==
Jock Mahoney signed a five-picture deal with Edward Small of which this was the first. It was originally known as Silver Dollar. Although it is generally regarded as a low budget Western, it was actually one of the first films to use blood squibs to simulate someone being shot. This happens twice: at around the 25 minute mark when Jason (Chris Alcaide) shoots and kills Dennison (Walter Sande), then around the 35 minute mark when Jason shoots and wounds Granger (Jock Mahoney).
