= Frances Mercer =

American actress (1915–2000)

- Mercer in 1938
- Born: October 21, 1915; New Rochelle, New York, U.S.
- Died: November 5, 2000 (aged 85); Los Angeles, California, U.S.
- Occupations: Actress, model
- Years active: 1938–1967
- Spouse(s): G. Robert Fleming, plus 2 others
- Father: Sid Mercer

Frances Mercer (October 21, 1915 – November 5, 2000) was an American film actress.

== Early years ==
Mercer was born in New Rochelle, New York, on October 21, 1915. Her father was sports writer Sid Mercer.

== Career ==
From beginning modeling as a teenager, she became one of New York's leading models before she turned to acting in the late 1930s. Her film debut was in Vivacious Lady (1938), and she debuted on Broadway in Very Warm for May (1939). She was featured on the cover of Redbook magazine's October 1940 issue.

She appeared in the films Blind Alibi, Crime Ring, Smashing the Rackets, The Mad Miss Manton, Annabel Takes a Tour, Beauty for the Asking, Society Lawyer, The Story of Vernon and Irene Castle, Piccadilly Incident, There's Always Tomorrow and Young and Dangerous.

Television series in which Mercer appeared included For Better or Worse and Dr. Hudson's Secret Journal. She had a radio program, Sunday Night at Nine, in New York. In her later years, when acting jobs became less available, she took other work, including being a medical assistant and a bank teller and dealing in antiques.

== Personal life and death ==
Mercer and scenarist Brand Cooper announced their engagement in February 1939.

Mercer was married to G. Robert Fleming, who was the Republican nominee for California's 16th congressional district in 1956, losing to Democratic incumbent Donald L. Jackson. She died on November 5, 2000, in Los Angeles, California at age 85.

== Filmography ==
Year	Title	Role	Notes
1938	Vivacious Lady	Helen	
1938	Blind Alibi	Ellen	
1938	Crime Ring	Judy Allen	
1938	Smashing the Rackets	Susan 'Pat' Lane	
1938	The Mad Miss Manton	Helen Frayne	
1938	Annabel Takes a Tour	Natalie Preston	
1939	Beauty for the Asking	Patricia Wharton	
1939	Society Lawyer	Sue Leonard	
1939	The Story of Vernon and Irene Castle	Claire Ford	
1946	Piccadilly Incident	Joan Draper	
1955	There's Always Tomorrow	Ruth Doran	
1957	Young and Dangerous	Mrs. Price	
