= Criminal Lawyer (1937 film) =

1937 American drama film directed by Christy Cabanne

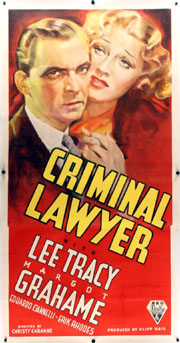
- Theatrical poster for the film
- Directed by: Christy Cabanne; Edward Killy; Jimmy Anderson (assistant)
- Screenplay by: Gladys Atwater; Thomas Lennon
- Story by: Louis Stevens
- Produced by: Samuel J. Briskin; Cliff Reid
- Starring: Lee Tracy; Margot Grahame; Eduardo Ciannelli
- Cinematography: David Abel
- Edited by: Jack Hively
- Production company: RKO Radio Pictures
- Distributed by: RKO Radio Pictures
- Release dates: January 26, 1937 (Premiere-New York City); January 29, 1937 (US)
- Running time: 72 minutes
- Country: United States
- Language: English

Criminal Lawyer is a 1937 American drama film directed by Christy Cabanne from a screenplay by G. V. Atwater and Thomas Lennon, based on a story by Louis Stevens. The film stars Lee Tracy and Margot Grahame, with Eduardo Ciannelli and Erik Rhodes in support. RKO produced the film, which premiered in New York City on January 26, 1937, with a national release on January 29. It was the second time Stevens' story had been used for a film, following 1932's State's Attorney, an RKO production starring John Barrymore and Helen Twelvetrees, directed by George Archainbaud.

== Plot ==
Barry Brandon is an unscrupulous defense attorney. He will use any means necessary to win his clients' cases. While in court defending one of his criminal clients, Gene Larkin, he sees a young woman on trial for prostitution, Madge Carter. Knowing her to be framed for the activity by a man who is notorious for “fingering” women in order to get the reward, he defends her for free. He wins her acquittal, after which he gives her a job as his secretary—and his cook.

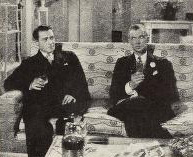
Cianelli and Tracy

Larkin, thinking that he can control Brandon, uses his influence to get Brandon elected to the district attorney's office. Brandon tells Larkin beforehand that if he becomes a prosecutor he will no longer work for him. He intends to take the job seriously. His zeal for his new position pays off, and soon he is the district attorney. With eyes on the governorship, he becomes romantically involved with Betty Walker, whose father has deep political connections, even though Brandon is in love with Madge. After a night of heavy drinking, Brandon wakes up to find out that he and Betty are married.

Crushed, Madge goes to Larkin's office late at night to ask him to cash a check for her so she can leave town. On the street, she sees him shoot and kill a rival gangster. He pulls her back into his office, threatens to kill Brandon and expose his earlier nefarious tactics as a defense attorney. He keeps her prisoner until the trial, three weeks later.

After three weeks of dodging Bandini, Brandon finally sees him. It turns out that Betty wants to marry Bandini. Her father approves and still supports Brandon's bid for governor. Brandon is delighted and says Betty can get an annulment for her unconsummated marriage.

In court, Brandon concludes his prosecution of Larkin. The defense calls a sole, surprise witness: Madge. Madge testifies that Larkin shot in self defense. As Brandon prepares to cross-exam her, Larkin asks if he wants to make Madge a perjurer. Brandon asks a few innocuous questions and returns to his seat, downcast. Larkin laughs maniacally. “That laugh is going to cost you your neck” Brandon says. His cross-examination of Madge exposes the truth about the murder and all the reasons for her perjury. Before Larkin can take the stand, Brandon confesses in open court to his past illegal tactics as a defense attorney. He explains that Larkin laughing “at justice” was the last straw. Eyes locked with Madge's, he declares that he is now free of absolutely everything that held him. She smiles, slightly. He turns his confession over to the grand jury and leaves the courtroom with his arm around Madge.

== Cast ==
- Lee Tracy as Barry Brandon
- Margot Grahame as Madge Carter
- Eduardo Ciannelli as Gene Larkin
- Erik Rhodes as Tony Bandini
- Betty Lawford as Betty Walker
- Frank M. Thomas as William Walker
- Wilfred Lucas as Brandon's assistant
- William Stack as District Attorney Hopkins
- Charles Lane as Defense attorney
- Lita Chevret as Nora James
- Claire McDowell as Judge
- Kenneth Thomson as Witness
- Aileen Pringle as Mrs. Manning

(Cast list as per AFI database.)

== Production ==
In 1932, RKO had produced a film titled State's Attorney, starring John Barrymore and Helen Twelvetrees. The story was written by Louis Stevens, with a screenplay by Gene Fowler and Rowland Brown. In 1937, the studio decided to remake the film, and this time gave Stevens' story to Thomas Lennon to write the script. At the same time they announced that Cliff Reid had been assigned as the supervising producer. Walter Abel was originally slated to have the leading role in the film, when production was announced in August 1936. In October 1936, it was announced that Lee Tracy would be replacing Abel in the lead, and that Katherine Marlowe would appear opposite him. It was also noted that Gladys Atwater would be assisting Lennon on the screenplay. Shortly after this, on October 3, 1936, RKO announced that it would shortly start production on the film. On October 6, Marlowe was replaced in the cast as the female lead by Margot Grahame; Aileen Pringle joined the cast less than a week later, with Lita Chevret and Wilfred Lucas also announced to the cast shortly after. At that same time, Francis McDonald was also announced to be included in the production. However, according to the AFI Database, his participation in the film has not been confirmed. Production on the film began in early October, and was completed by November 7.

In January 1937, it was announced that Erik Rhodes would be singing "Tonight, Lover, Tonight", which was penned by Jack Stern and Harry Tobias. Right after the New Year, the film's release date was announced as January 29, 1937. The film opened on January 29. The National Legion of Decency graded the film class "A-1", making it suitable for general audiences.

== Reception ==
Contemporary reviews were enthusiastic.

The Film Daily gave the film a favorable review, calling it logical, exciting, and swiftly paced. They complimented the acting, highlighting the performances of Tracy, Grahame, Ciannelli, and Lawford. The also highlighted Cabanne's direction, as well as Abel's cinematography. Harrison's Reports also enjoyed the film, calling it a "fair melodrama, with a good sprinkling of comedy". They favorably pointed out Tracy and Grahame's acting. Motion Picture Daily said that the picture "...effectively combines drama, romance and comedy ...", and were particularly enthusiastic about Tracy's performance, saying the film was "incredibly enhanced by the quality" of his performance, which was likely to send the movie-goers away talking. The magazine also mentioned the quality of the performance of the other players in the film, including Grahame, Cianelli, Lawford, Rhodes, Thomas, Lucas, and Stack. They felt the script by Lennon and Atwater was "well knit", and that Cabanne's direction kept the film moving and suspenseful. The Motion Picture Herald felt the picture had a "powerful dramatic quality," which built to a "smashing climax."
