= American Empire (film) =

1942 film

- Theatrical release poster
- Directed by: William C. McGann
- Written by: J. Robert Bren (story); Gladys Atwater (story); J. Robert Bren (writer) and Gladys Atwater (writer) and Ben Grauman Kohn (writer)
- Produced by: Harry Sherman; Dick Dickson
- Starring: See below
- Cinematography: Russell Harlan
- Edited by: Carroll Lewis
- Music by: Gerard Carbonara
- Distributed by: Paramount Pictures
- Release date: 11 December 1942
- Running time: 82 minutes
- Country: United States
- Language: English

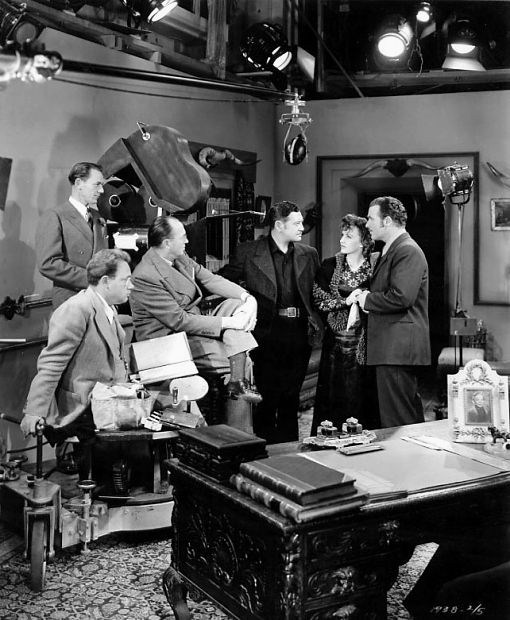
L-R: Russell Harlan (cinematographer, standing), unknown, William C. McGann (director), Richard Dix, Frances Gifford & Preston Foster on the set of American Empire (1942)

American Empire is a 1942 American Western film directed by William C. McGann. The film was released in the United Kingdom as My Son Alone.

== Plot ==
Three Civil War vets head to Texas and build a cattle empire, and battle rustlers, bad weather and each other. The first man abandons ship, and he is soon followed by the second partner. That leaves the "good guy" to defend his property from the vengeful traitors.

== Cast ==
- Richard Dix as Dan Taylor
- Leo Carrillo as Dominique Beauchard
- Preston Foster as Paxton Bryce
- Frances Gifford as Abigail 'Abby' Taylor, Dan's Sister
- Robert Barrat as Crowder, Small Rancher
- Jack La Rue as Pierre, Beauchard Henchman
- Guinn "Big Boy" Williams as Sailaway
- Cliff Edwards as Runty
- Merrill Rodin as Paxton Bryce Jr.
- Chris-Pin Martin as Augustin, Beauchard Henchman
- Richard Webb as Crane (small rancher)
- William Farnum as Louisiana Judge
- Etta McDaniel as Willa May, Bryce's Maid
- Hal Taliaferro as Malone

== Soundtrack ==
- Cliff Edwards – "Little Pal" (Written by Lew Pollack)
