= Vivacious Lady =

1938 film by George Stevens

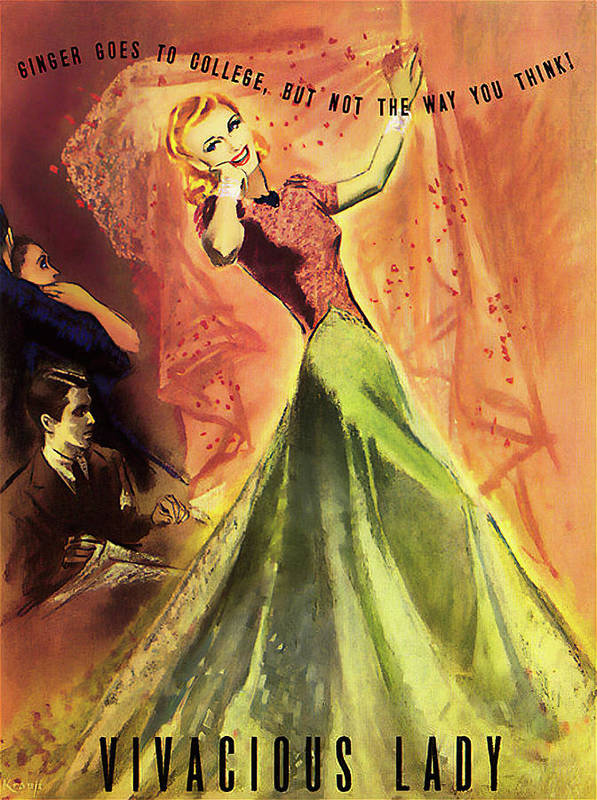
- Theatrical release poster by William Rose
- Directed by: George Stevens
- Screenplay by: P. J. Wolfson; Ernest Pagano
- Based on: "Vivacious Lady"; 1936 story in Pictorial Review by I. A. R. Wylie
- Produced by: George Stevens
- Starring: Ginger Rogers; James Stewart; James Ellison; Beulah Bondi; Charles Coburn
- Cinematography: Robert De Grasse
- Edited by: Henry Berman
- Music by: Roy Webb
- Production company: RKO Radio Pictures
- Distributed by: RKO Radio Pictures
- Release date: May 13, 1938
- Running time: 90 minutes
- Country: United States
- Language: English
- Budget: $703,000
- Box office: $1,206,000

Vivacious Lady is a 1938 American black-and-white romantic comedy film directed by George Stevens and starring Ginger Rogers and James Stewart. James Ellison, Frances Mercer, Beulah Bondi, and Charles Coburn appear in supporting roles.

It was released by RKO Radio Pictures. The screenplay was written by P.J. Wolfson and Ernest Pagano and adapted from a short story by I. A. R. Wylie. The music score was by Roy Webb, and the cinematography by Robert De Grasse.

The story is of love at first sight between a conservative young botany professor and a nightclub singer. Its comedic elements include repeatedly frustrated attempts by the newlywed couple to find a moment alone with each other and to consummate their marriage.

== Plot ==
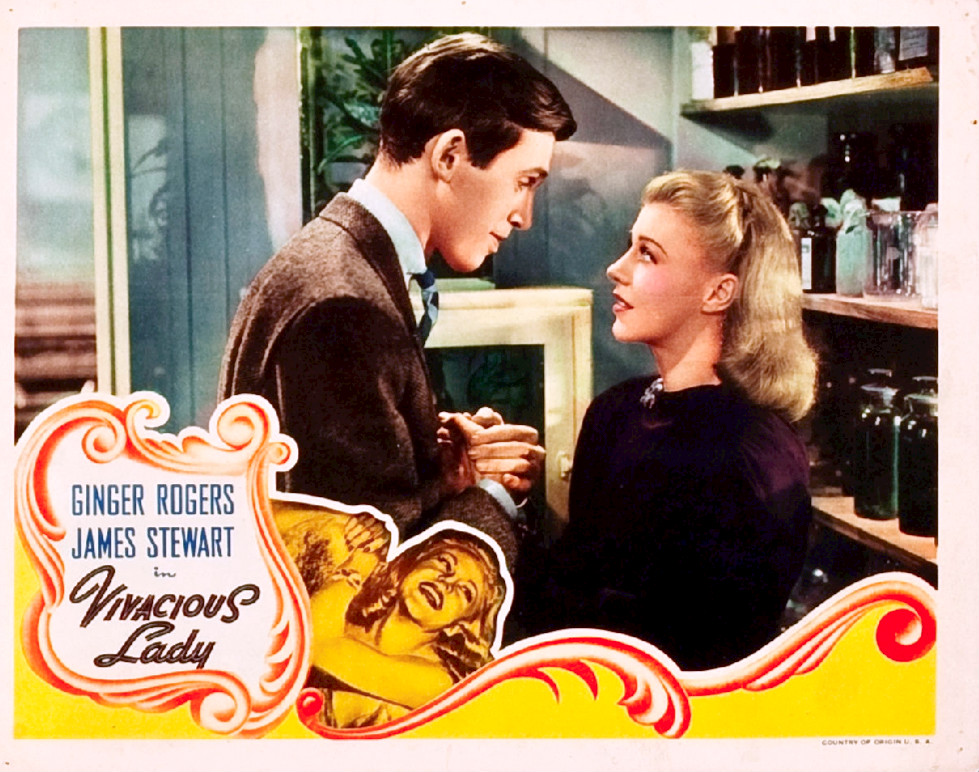
Lobby card for the film

Botany professor Peter Morgan Jr. is sent to Manhattan to retrieve his playboy cousin Keith; he immediately falls in love with nightclub singer Francey Brent, Keith’s current infatuation. After a whirlwind one-day courtship, Peter and Francey get married. The trio then returns to the Morgan family's home in the small town of Old Sharon, where Peter teaches at the university run by his father, Peter Morgan Sr. Mr. Morgan is known for being a proud, overbearing man, so Peter is afraid to tell him about the marriage. When they arrive, Mr. Morgan and Peter's blueblood fiancée, Helen, initially take Francey for another of Keith's racy girlfriends. While Peter decides how to approach his father with the news, Francey is introduced as a new botany student and lodged at a women-only hotel in the college town.

Peter mentions Francey to his father twice, but on both occasions, Mr. Morgan interrupts and ignores his son, and when Peter becomes insistent, his apparently ailing mother has a flare-up of her heart condition, making any further conversation impossible. For his third attempt, Peter decides to announce the marriage to his parents at the university's student-faculty prom. Keith brings Francey as his guest, and Francey, still posing as a student, develops a friendly rapport with Mrs. Morgan, but gets into a nasty brawl with Helen in which Francey accidentally slugs Peter's father in the jaw.

Peter says nothing at the prom, but blurts the news to his father just as Mr. Morgan is about to give an important speech, resulting in another argument and another flare-up of Mrs. Morgan's heart condition. This prevents Mrs. Morgan from learning of the marriage, but she accidentally finds out from Francey herself during a conversation in Francey's apartment. Mrs. Morgan accepts the news happily, and admits to Francey that she pretends to have heart trouble any time her husband gets agitated.

Mr. Morgan arrives and catches Francey, Keith, and his own wife doing a highly spirited version of the popular dance, the “Big Apple“. Unamused, Morgan demands that Francey leave Peter, threatening to fire him if she does not. Francey capitulates, but the incident releases 30 years of marital frustration in Mrs. Morgan, who also decides to leave her husband.

Francey tells Peter she is leaving him. He vows that he can change his father's mind before her train departs. His solution is to threaten the family with disgrace by getting drunk and otherwise misbehaving until his father relents, even if it costs him his job. Peter passes out before he can reach the train, which departs with both Francey and Mrs. Morgan aboard. Mr. Morgan finally yields to the combined pressure of his son and wife, and Peter and he stop the train by overhauling it and parking the family car on the track. Both marriages are saved, and Peter and Francey finally launch their long-postponed honeymoon on the train.

== Cast ==
- Ginger Rogers as Francey Morgan
- James Stewart as Prof. Peter Morgan Jr.
- James Ellison as Keith Morgan
- Beulah Bondi as Mrs. Martha Morgan
- Charles Coburn as Peter Morgan Sr.
- Frances Mercer as Helen
- Phyllis Kennedy as Jenny
- Franklin Pangborn as apartment manager
- Grady Sutton as Culpepper, teaching assistant
- Jack Carson as Charlie, waiter captain
- Alec Craig as Joseph, chauffeur
- Willie Best as train porter
- Hattie McDaniel as a maid (uncredited)

== Production ==
Ginger Rogers and James Stewart were dating prior to the production of Vivacious Lady. Although neither actor had collaborated on any prior work, Rogers recommended Stewart as her leading man, becoming one of Stewart's earliest starring roles.

After four days of shooting in April 1937, Stewart became ill, but then left to costar in Of Human Hearts (1938). RKO considered replacing Stewart, but shelved the production until December 1937. Actors Donald Crisp and Fay Bainter, who had been cast in the original production, were replaced, respectively, by Charles Coburn and Beulah Bondi.

== Reception ==
The film made a profit of $75,000.

In the early 1960s, Steve McQueen announced that he wanted to appear in a remake, but this did not happen.

== Awards and nominations ==
Vivacious Lady was nominated for two Oscars, for Best Cinematography and Best Sound, Recording (John O. Aalberg). George Stevens won a Special Recommendation Award at the 1938 Venice Film Festival.

== Adaptations to other media ==
Vivacious Lady was adapted as a radio play on the April 7, 1940, episode of The Screen Guild Theater with Ginger Rogers and Fred MacMurray, the January 6, 1941, episode of Lux Radio Theatre with Alice Faye and Don Ameche, the October 2, 1945, episode of CBS's Theater of Romance with Robert Walker and Lurene Tuttle, the December 3, 1945, Screen Guild Theater with James Stewart and Janet Blair, and the August 14, 1946, episode of Academy Award Theater with Lana Turner. It was also presented on the radio anthology series Philip Morris Playhouse on February 13, 1942, with Madeleine Carroll starring.
