= Parents on Trial =

1939 film

- Directed by: Sam Nelson
- Written by: Gladys Atwater; J. Robert Bren
- Produced by: Irving Briskin
- Starring: Jean Parker; Johnny Downs; Noah Beery Jr.
- Cinematography: John Stumar
- Edited by: James Sweeney
- Music by: Morris Stoloff
- Production company: Columbia Pictures
- Distributed by: Columbia Pictures
- Release date: September 21, 1939
- Running time: 58 minutes
- Country: United States
- Language: English

Parents on Trial is a 1939 American drama film directed by Sam Nelson and starring Jean Parker, Johnny Downs and Noah Beery Jr.

== Cast ==
- Jean Parker as Susan Wesley
- Johnny Downs as Don Martin
- Noah Beery Jr. as Jerry Kearns
- Henry Kolker as James Wesley
- Virginia Brissac as Mrs. Martin
- Nana Bryant as Margaret Ames
- Linda Perry as Linda Ames
- Richard Fiske as Lawrence Hastings
- Mary Gordon as Martha

== Bibliography ==
- Lyons, Arthur. Death On The Cheap: The Lost B Movies Of Film Noir. Hachette Books, 2000.
