= Jim Hanvey, Detective =

1937 film by Phil Rosen

- Directed by: Phil Rosen
- Written by: Octavus Roy Cohen (story); Olive Cooper (screenplay); Cortland Fitzsimmons (adaptation); Joseph Krumgold (screenplay); Eric Taylor (adaptation)
- Produced by: Joseph Krumgold (associate producer); Albert E. Levoy (executive producer)
- Starring: Guy Kibbee; Tom Brown; Lucie Kaye
- Cinematography: Jack A. Marta
- Edited by: William Morgan
- Production company: Republic Pictures
- Distributed by: Republic Pictures
- Release date: April 5, 1937
- Running time: 71 minutes
- Country: United States
- Language: English

Jim Hanvey, Detective is a 1937 American mystery film directed by Phil Rosen and starring Guy Kibbee, Tom Brown and Lucie Kaye. It was produced and distributed by Republic Pictures. It is loosely based on the short story collection of the same name by novelist Octavus Roy Cohen.

== Cast ==
- Guy Kibbee as James Woolford "Jim" Hanvey
- Tom Brown as Don Terry
- Lucie Kaye as Joan Frost
- Catherine Doucet as Adelaide Frost
- Edward Gargan as O. R.Smith
- Edward Brophy as Romo
- Helen Jerome Eddy as Mrs. Tom Ellis
- Theodore von Eltz as Dunn
- Kenneth Thomson as W. B. Elwood
- Howard C. Hickman as Herbert Frost
- Oscar Apfel as Lambert
- Wade Boteler as Davis
- Robert Emmett Keane as Editor
- Robert Homans as Sheriff Garrett
- Harry Tyler as Taxi Driver
- Frank Darien as Pete
- Charles Williams as Brackett
