= Smashing the Rackets =

1938 film by Lew Landers

- Theatrical release poster
- Directed by: Lew Landers
- Written by: Lionel Houser
- Based on: Smashing the Rackets; 1938 in The Saturday Evening Post by Forrest Davis
- Produced by: B.P. Fineman
- Starring: Chester Morris; Frances Mercer; Rita Johnson; Bruce Cabot; Edward Pawley
- Cinematography: Nicholas Musuraca
- Edited by: Harry Marker
- Music by: Frank Tours
- Production company: RKO Pictures
- Distributed by: RKO Pictures
- Release date: August 19, 1938
- Running time: 69 minutes
- Country: United States
- Language: English

Smashing the Rackets is a 1938 American drama film directed by Lew Landers, written by Lionel Houser, and starring Chester Morris, Frances Mercer, Rita Johnson, Bruce Cabot and Edward Pawley. It was released on August 19, 1938, by RKO Pictures.

== Plot ==
Jim 'Sock' Conway, former boxer and FBI hero, is maneuvered for political reasons into a do-nothing job in the district attorney's office. He considers quitting but agrees to remain in his job to defend Letty Lane in order to court her much nicer sister Pat.

Meanwhile, a gang led by White Clark and Chin Martin begins a protection racket to force local businesses to install slot machines. Chin hires Letty's boyfriend Steve Lawrence, an attorney, to file an injunction to prevent the attorney from interfering with their plans. Steve begins plotting to take over the gang from Whitey, who he finds too brutal. After Whitey orders the brutal beating of Jim's friends Franz and Otto and Otto dies, Jim uses his position to prosecute the hoodlums and is promoted. He then secures an indictment of a major racketeer.

Steve and Chin kill Whitey, and then Steve arranges for Chin to be caught in a police raid. A suspicious Letty tracks Steve to his home in country just as Chin arrives to kill Steve, and she fatally shoots him. Steve's mistress Peggy provides testimony that allows Steve to be indicted. Letty kills herself in an automobile accident in order to avoid damaging her sister's reputation. Jim and Pat are married, and he founds his own law practice.

== Cast ==
- Chester Morris as Jim 'Sock' Conway
- Frances Mercer as Susan 'Pat' Lane
- Rita Johnson as Letty Lane
- Bruce Cabot as Steve Lawrence
- Edward Pawley as Chin Martin
- Joe De Stefani as Franz
- Don Douglas as Harry Spaulding
- Kay Sutton as Peggy
- Ben Welden as Whitey Clark
- Paul Fix as Maxie
- Eddie Acuff as Joe
- George Irving as District Attorney Edward Greer

== Production ==
The film was based on Forrest Davis's series of articles on Thomas E. Dewey's campaign against organized crime in New York City.
