= Everybody's Doing It (1938 film) =

1938 film directed by Christy Cabanne

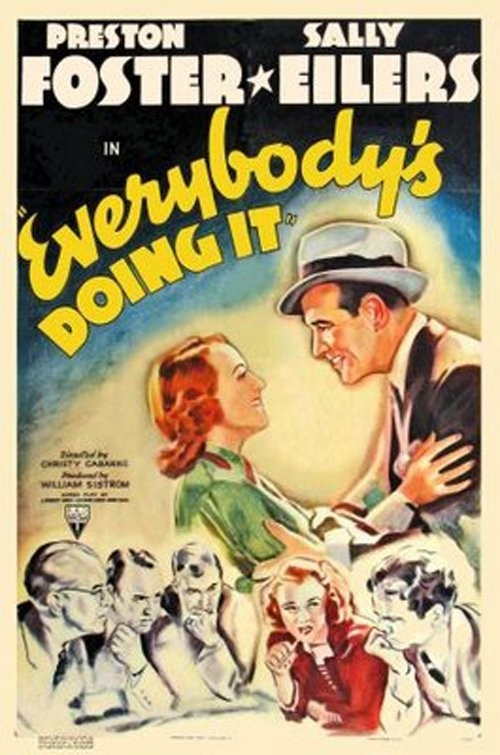
- Poster for the film
- Directed by: Christy Cabanne
- Screenplay by: J. Robert Bren; Edmund Joseph; Harry Segall
- Story by: George Beck
- Produced by: William Sistrom
- Starring: Preston Foster; Sally Eilers
- Cinematography: Nicholas Musuraca; Paul C. Vogel
- Edited by: Ted Cheesman
- Music by: Frank Tours
- Production company: RKO Radio Pictures
- Release date: January 14, 1938 (US)
- Running time: 67 minutes
- Country: United States
- Language: English

Everybody's Doing It is a 1938 American comedy film directed by Christy Cabanne using a screenplay by J. Robert Bren, Edmund Joseph, and Harry Segall, based on George Beck's story. RKO produced and distributed the film, releasing it on January 14, 1938. The movie stars Preston Foster and Sally Eilers.

== Plot ==
Bruce Keene works in the advertising department of Beyers and Company, which produces cereal, among other things. His heavy drinking conflicts with his work output. He and his fiancé, Penny Wilton, who also works in the advertising department, believe that a boost in the sales of Beyers' cereal can come about if Keene draws a series of pictograms to be printed on the cereal boxes over a 30-week period. Customers who solve all 30 pictograms will be eligible to compete for a $100,000 prize. Willy Beyers, the company president, agrees to the concept, and the contest is launched.

The contest is very successful, but Keene tires of creating a new pictogram in the waning weeks of the contest. He resumes his heavy drinking in bars. Wilton fears for her fiancé's future, hires a small-time hood, Softy Blane, to feign Keene's kidnaping so that while in the countryside he will finish the series of pictograms. Blane works for Steve Devers, a gangster who has taken an interest in manipulating the contest in order to win the $100,000. Blane doublecrosses Wilton, and really kidnaps Keene, taking him to Devers' hideout.

Keene works in captivity to expose his kidnappers by drawing pictograms that tell of his situation that are sent to Beyers. Wilton understands the clues, and uses them to puzzle out where Keene is being held. She leads the police to the hideout, and after a shootout, Keene is rescued. Reunited with his fiancé, he promises to reform his drinking ways and marries Wilton.

== Cast ==
- Preston Foster as Bruce Keene
- Sally Eilers as Penny Wilton
- Cecil Kellaway as Mr. Beyers
- Lorraine Krueger as Bubbles Blane
- William Brisbane as Willy Beyers
- Richard Lane as Steve Devers
- Guinn Williams as Softy Blane
- Arthur Lake as Waldo
- Solly Ward as Gus
- Frank M. Thomas as Charlie
- Herbert Evans as Grady
- Jack Carson as Lieutenant
- Fuzzy Knight as Gangster
- Willie Best as Jasper)

(Cast list as per AFI film database)

== Production ==
In June 1937 it was announced that B. P. Schulberg and Vivienne Osborne had been cast in the picture. By the middle of November 1937 the film, still known by its working title, Easy Millions, had finished production and was in the editing room. A November Variety article listed Christy Cabanne as the director, as well as William Sistrom as the producer. The screenplay was by J. Robert Bren, Edmund Joseph, and Harry Segall, while the cinematographer was announced as Paul Vogel. The cast list was described as Preston Foster, Sally Eilers, Paul Guilfoyle, Cecil Kellaway, and Lorraine Krueger. In early December the title of the film was changed to Everybody's Doing It, from its working title of Easy Millions. In mid-December, it was announced that the picture was to be released on January 14, 1938, and RKO did release the film on that date. The National Legion of Decency approved the picture for all audiences, rating it class A-1.

== Reception ==
Harrison's Reports gave the film a mediocre review, stating that the plot was "so thin that, in order to pad it out to a full length feature, the producer had to use up some of the footage in the most stupid type of slapstick imaginable". Motion Picture Daily's opinion was quite lukewarm, saying that the film was an "inexpensive fabrication that may be unusual enough to satisfy the moderate taste moderately." The Motion Picture Herald gave a very ambiguous review, wherein they neither praised nor spoke negatively about the film, instead speaking about the film's structure and relation to recent films written along similar lines. They also linked the plot of the film to a recently past advertising scheme, called "Gold Coast", which bore a striking resemblance to the advertising gambit portrayed in the film. Finally, the magazine did comment that the audience's reaction at the showing they viewed was "spotty".
