= Super-Sleuth =

1937 film by Benjamin Stoloff

- Directed by: Ben Stoloff
- Written by: Gertrude Purcell; Ernest Pagano
- Produced by: Edward Small
- Starring: Jack Oakie; Ann Sothern; Eduardo Ciannelli
- Cinematography: Joseph H. August
- Edited by: William Hamilton
- Production company: RKO Radio Pictures
- Distributed by: RKO Radio Pictures
- Release date: July 16, 1937
- Running time: 75 minutes
- Country: United States
- Language: English

Super-Sleuth is a 1937 American mystery comedy film directed by Ben Stoloff. It was an early lead role for Jack Oakie. Super Sleuth was a remade in 1946 as Genius at Work, with comedy team of Wally Brown and Alan Carney.

== Plot ==
A film detective believes he actually has the skills to solve a real life case. Bill Martin's (Jack Oakie) boasts irritate the real detectives of the Los Angeles police, as well as studio publicist Mary Strand (Ann Sothern), who loves Bill but doesn't appreciate the actor's arrogance.

A mysterious killer known as the "Poison Pen" decides to murder Bill, annoyed with his last movie. Bill and Mary go to amateur sleuth Professor Herman (Eduardo Ciannelli) for advice, unaware that the professor and the murderer are one and the same.

By mistake, film co-star Ralph Waring (Bradley Page) is killed by the Poison Pen, and stand-in Larry Frank (Alan Bruce) is suspected of the crime. To save Bill from the killer and from himself, Mary arranges for him to be locked up, but the gullible Bill gets Professor Herman to bail him out of jail. Mary and the cops come to his rescue just in time.

== Cast ==
- Jack Oakie as Willard "Bill" Martin
- Ann Sothern as Mary Strand
- Eduardo Ciannelli as Professor Herman
- Alan Bruce as Larry Frank
- Edgar Kennedy as Lieutenant Garrison
- Joan Woodbury as Doris Dunne
- Bradley Page as Ralph Waring
- Paul Guilfoyle as Gibbons
- Willie Best as Warts
- William Corson as Beckett
- Alec Craig as Eddie, doorman

== Critical reception ==
Frank S. Nugent of the The New York Times described the film as "an amusing bit of nonsense" and stated that "The word is that RKO Radio is making practically nothing but comedy these days and, if they're all as good as Super-Sleuth … it will be all right with me." He expressed approval of the performers and added that the "cast generally has entered whole-heartedly into the spirit of the farce."

Modern Screen’s Leo Townsend offered a less positive assessment and commented that "what was intended to be an hilarious farce emerges as something considerably less than that." Discussing the performers, he expressed the opinion that Jack Oakie "used to be funnier" and that the villain was portrayed as "much too sinister for the purposes of comedy … which served to spoil the denouement."
