= Face in the Sky =

1933 film

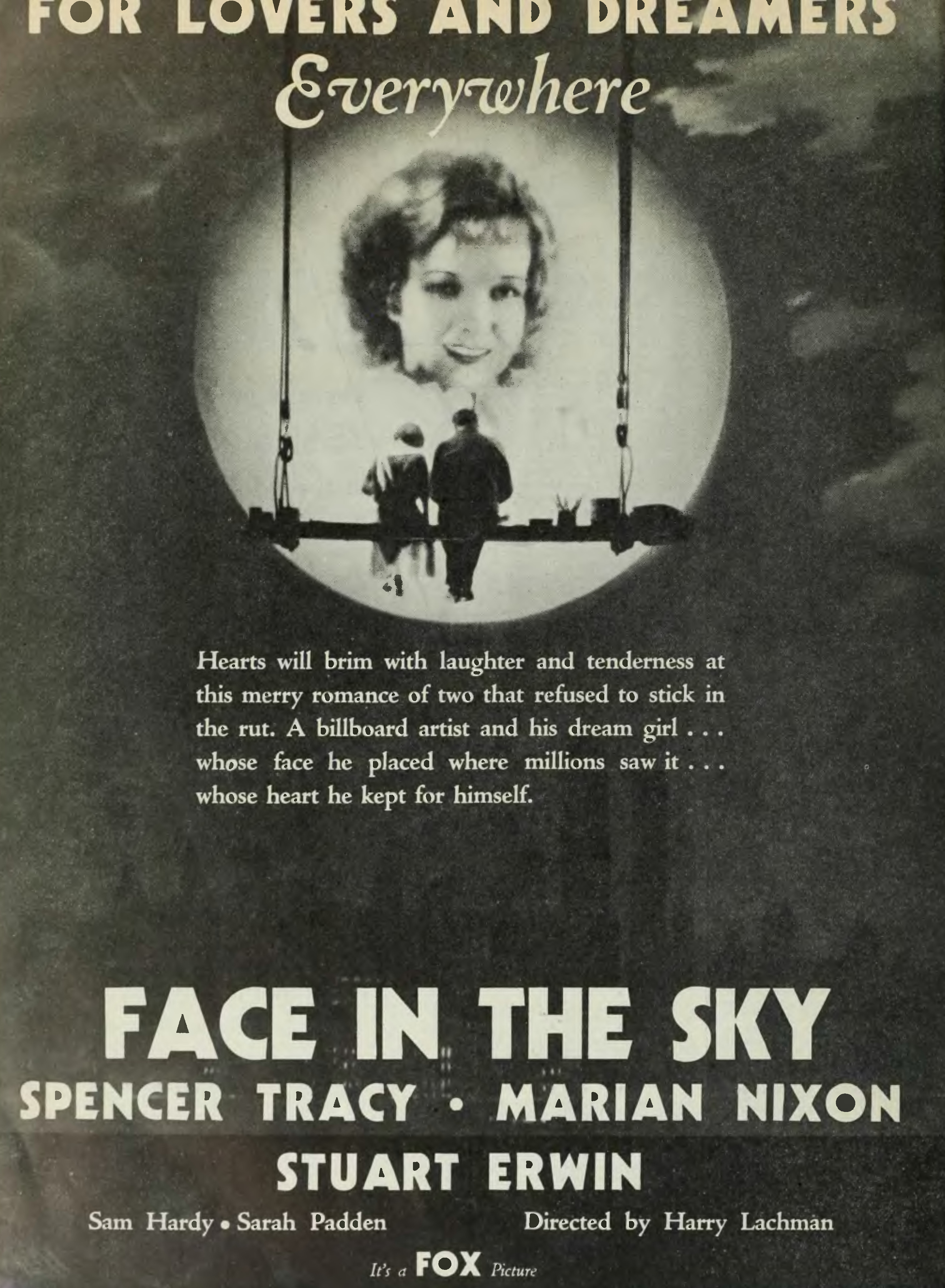
Face in the Sky ad from The Film Daily, 1932

Face in the Sky is a 1933 American pre-Code comedy film starring Spencer Tracy and Stuart Erwin. The film was directed by Harry Lachman and released by Fox Film.

== Plot ==
Two sign painters find themselves blackmailed by a beautiful woman determined to force one of them into marriage.

== Cast ==
- Spencer Tracy as Joe Buck
- Marian Nixon as Madge
- Stuart Erwin as Lucky
- Sam Hardy as Triplet The Great
- Sarah Padden as Ma Brown
- Frank McGlynn Jr. as Jim Brown
- Russell Simpson as Pa Nathan Brown
- Billy Platt as Jupiter - Midget
- Lila Lee as Sharon Hadley
- Guy Usher as Albert Preston
