= In Old California (1942 film) =

1942 film by William C. McGann

- Directed by: William C. McGann
- Screenplay by: Gertrude Purcell; Frances Hyland
- Story by: J. Robert Bren; Gladys Atwater
- Produced by: Robert North
- Starring: John Wayne; Binnie Barnes; Albert Dekker; Helen Parrish; Patsy Kelly; Edgar Kennedy; Dick Purcell
- Cinematography: Jack A. Marta
- Edited by: Howard O'Neill
- Music by: David Buttolph
- Production company: Republic Pictures
- Distributed by: Republic Pictures
- Release date: May 31, 1942 (United States)
- Running time: 88 minutes
- Country: United States
- Language: English

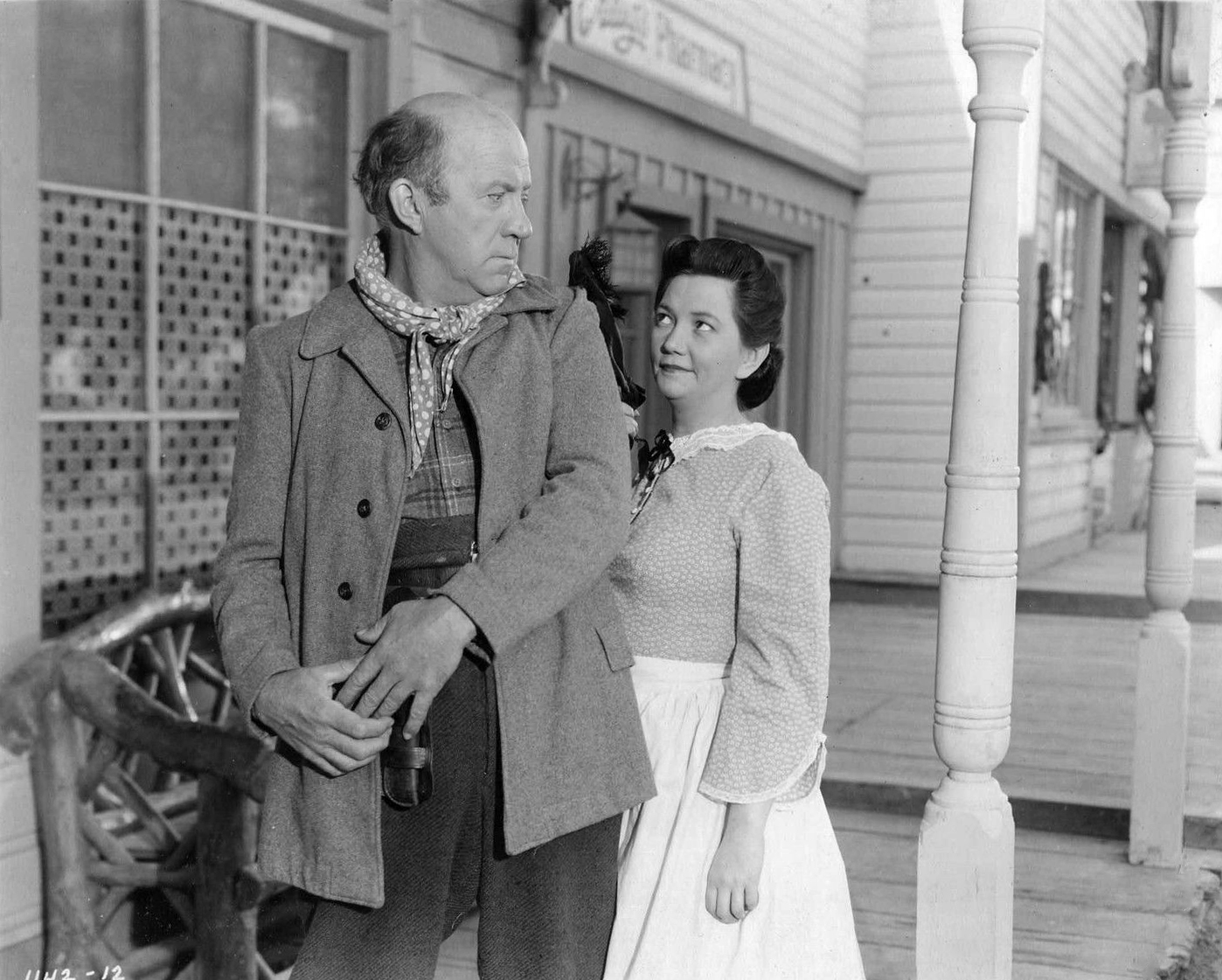
Edgar Kennedy and Patsy Kelly

In Old California is a 1942 American Western film directed by William C. McGann starring John Wayne, Binnie Barnes and Albert Dekker. Wayne plays Tom Craig, a Boston pharmacist who relocates to Sacramento during the Gold Rush.

== Plot ==
Boston pharmacist Tom Craig arrives in San Francisco, en route to Sacramento, and visits a saloon while waiting for a river boat. The locals scoff at his eastern attire and polite manners and are astounded when he orders milk at the bar. They are impressed when he bends a coin with one hand before paying. When Kegs McKeever comes in rampaging over his toothache (again), Tom manages to treat him to the relief of those in the bar. On his way to the boat he carries singer Lacey Miller across a mud puddle angering her fiance Britt Dawson who hits Tom. Tom does not retaliate but bends another coin before giving it to a boy who has retrieved his hat. Britt decides to not carry the altercation further. Kegs joins Craig on the river boat.

Britt pressures a Mr. Carlin into selling part of his ranch to him cheaply, eventually shooting him in the hand. Tom hears and goes into the room to dress the wound. He then says Britt's version of the shooting was a lie and Britt has his henchman throw Tom overboard. Kegs is about fight Britt but changes his mind and jumps in after Tom. Britt tells the passengers anyone who is friendly with Tom in Sacramento is no friend of Britt's. When Tom tries to rent somewhere to set up his drugstore, no-one will rent to him. Eventually he rents Lacey's store and goes into partnership with her. When Britt finds out he is angry until Lacey points out that she is a partner and expects to make a lot of money as it is the only drugstore in town.

Ellen Sanford arranges an introduction to Tom and they begin dating, to Lacey's displeasure. Tom is about to propose when Lacey is about to interrupt again. Ellen sends Tom to get a fan and then argues with Lacey, finally slapping her before Tom arrives back. Tom has to leave, but says he will ask "that "question" of Ellen before she leave on the boat to San Francisco the next day.

A gang of Dawson's men are evicting the settlers. Tom and Kegs go to the home of one of the settlers to head them off, while the other settlers and townsfolk gather together and follow them. Britt and his brother Joe arrive at the settler's house and assault Tom, but before things escalate the mob arrives and the gang leaves, suffering casualties on the way. Back in town, Britt and Joe are waiting behind the drugstore to shoot Tom, but Lacey says if they harm him she and Britt are through. Britt comes up with a plan to get rid of Tom without Lacey knowing he was involved and goes into the drugstore.

Tom proposes to Ellen as she leaves for San Francisco and she accepts. Helga, Lacey's lady's maid who is cleaning the drugstore, pulls Kegs sore tooth out while he is asleep and marches him off at gunpoint to get married. While they are out, Whitey, the town drunk, enters the store and drinks Tom's elixir tonic. Tom returns to find a crowd around the store and Whitey inside dead. He checks the elixir bottle and finds it has been poisoned with laudanum. The crowd blames Tom and attempt to lynch him, but he is saved when gold is discovered. The mob, including the Dawsons, race off to Sutter's Mill.

With the growth of Sacramento due to gold seekers there is now a US Marshal in town, but he refuses to open a case against Britt as the poisoner. Tom decides to close the store as he has no customers while they still think he is guilty. Britt arrives and shoots up the store. Tom confronts him in the saloon, but just as he looks like beating a confession out of Britt, the Marshal arrives and breaks it up. When Tom tries to continue, the Marshal arrests him.

Lacey leaves Britt, who still denies being the poisoner but she doesn't believe him. Lacey, Helga, and Kegs head for the gold fields. When they arrive they discover that there is a typhoid fever epidemic. Kegs rides back to Sacramento for medicine. Tom is out of jail and packing up his stock to go with Ellen to San Francisco. Kegs tells him about the epidemic and Tom says they will need him. Ellen does not want him to go. When he insists, she tells him not to come back to her. Tom tells the townsfolk more medicine is on the way, and that anyone brave enough can help take it to the gold fields. Britt tells Joe that if they steal the medicine they can sell it for a huge amount at the gold fields.

While Britt's gang is waiting to ambush the wagons, one of the gang returns and tells Britt that Lacey is in the camp helping the sick. Britt tells Joe to lead the ambush while he goes to rescue Lacey. Joe says he's a fool and Britt knocks him down. Joe shoots Britt in the back, then the wagons appear, and the gang takes off for the ambush. Britt who is badly wounded manages to climb on his horse and follows. The wagons make a run for it and take cover in a draw. After several men on both sides are killed, Tom says he wants to talk and Joe agrees. Tom tells Joe the gang will need the medicine because they all have the fever. Joe tells his men to rush the wagons, then Britt appears and shoots him. Tom takes the medicine and Britt to the camp.

Britt admits to poisoning Tom's elixir, then dies. Back in Sacramento, Tom and Lacey are together.

== Cast ==
- John Wayne as Tom Craig
- Binnie Barnes as Lacey Miller
- Albert Dekker as Britt Dawson
- Helen Parrish as Ellen Sanford
- Patsy Kelly as Helga
- Edgar Kennedy as Kegs McKeever
- Dick Purcell as Joe Dawson
- Harry Shannon as Mr. Carlin
- Charles Halton as Mr. Hayes
- Emmett Lynn as Whitey
- Robert McKenzie as Mr. Bates (as Bob McKenzie)
- Milton Kibbee as Ezra Tompkins (as Milt Kibbee)
- Paul Sutton as Chick – Dawson's stooge
- Anne O'Neal as Mrs. Tompkins

== See also ==
- John Wayne filmography
