= This Marriage Business =

1938 American film directed by Christy Cabanne

- Directed by: Christy Cabanne; Eddie Donahue
- Screenplay by: Gladys Atwater; J. Robert Bren
- Story by: Mel Riddle; Alex Rubin
- Produced by: Cliff Reid
- Starring: Allan Lane; Jack Carson; Victor Moore; Vicki Lester
- Cinematography: Joseph H. August
- Edited by: Harry Marker
- Production company: RKO Radio Pictures
- Release date: April 8, 1938 (US)
- Running time: 71 minutes
- Country: United States
- Language: English

This Marriage Business is a 1938 American comedy film directed by Christy Cabanne from a screenplay by Gladys Atwater and J. Robert Bren, based on a story by Mel Riddle and Alex Rubin. The film stars Allan Lane, Jack Carson, Victor Moore, and Vicki Lester. Produced by RKO Radio Pictures, which also distributed the film, it was released on April 8, 1938.

== Cast ==
- Victor Moore as Jud Parker
- Allan Lane as Bill Bennett
- Vickie Lester as Nancy Parker (as Vicki Lester)
- Cecil Kellaway as Police Chief Hardy
- Jack Carson as 'Candid' Perry
- Richard Lane as Joe Selby
- Kay Sutton as Bella Lawson
- Paul Guilfoyle as Frankie Spencer
- Vinton Hayworth as Attorney Lloyd Wilson (as Jack Arnold)
- Frank M. Thomas as Mayor Frisbee
- Leona Roberts as Mrs. Platt
- George Irving as Madden
