= Alice B. Curtis =

American writer, teacher, activist (1874–1956)

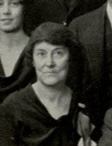
Alice B. Curtis c. 1935

Alice Bertha Curtis (January 1, 1874 – April 19, 1956) was an American suffragist active with the National American Woman's Suffrage Association, a college professor, author of two fictionalized childhood memoirs, Children of the Prairie (1938) and Winter on the Prairie (1945), and the writer of the short story "Wings of Mercy" that was adapted for the 1937 RKO movie The Man Who Found Himself.

== Life and work ==
Educated at Iowa State Normal School, University of Iowa, and University of Chicago, Curtis taught at small Midwestern colleges in the early 1900s and was associate professor of English at Colorado A. & M. College from 1922 to 1942.

Curtis was involved in political action for women's suffrage in four states: Iowa, Oklahoma, West Virginia, and Wisconsin. She worked as private secretary to Carrie Chapman Catt during the Iowa campaign, as a salaried suffrage worker in Wisconsin, and on a petition signature drive in Oklahoma.

Curtis was the author of magazine articles and short stories, verse, and two novels dealing with pioneer life in Iowa. She is featured on the Literary Map of Iowa produced in 1952 by the Iowa Association of Teachers of English. Her story "Wings of Mercy" was the source material for the 1937 RKO Radio movie starring Joan Fontaine.

The pioneer novels for children are set in Iowa and were likely based on her childhood in that state. Winter on the Prairie is in the public domain; the copyright for Children of the Prairie was renewed in the 1960s by Curtis' literary executors. Alice Dalgliesh writing in Parents magazine called Children "real and friendly." Children of the Prairie was recommended for purchase by Indiana school libraries and was suggested reading for a fifth-grade unit study on "pioneers of the west." Child Life magazine called Winter on the Prairie an "excellent story" and excerpt from Winter called "The Blizzard" was included in a Canadian elementary-school reader. Winter on the Prairie was illustrated by Grace Paull.

Curtis lived in Fort Collins, Colorado until her death in 1956.
