= Cortland Fitzsimmons =

American novelist and screenwriter

- Born: June 19, 1893; Richmond Hill, Queens
- Died: July 25, 1949 (aged 56); Los Angeles, California
- Occupation: Writer (novelist)
- Spouse: Menie Muriel Simpson (m. 1927)
- Writing career
- Period: 20th century
- Genres: screenwriter, crime fiction

Cortland Fitzsimmons (June 19, 1893 – July 25, 1949) was an American writer and screenwriter, and author of crime fiction.

== Biography ==
Fitzsimmons was born on June 19, 1893, in Richmond Hills, Long Island, located in the New York City borough of Queens. He was the only child of Martha Emma Gritman and Simon Michael Fitzsimmons. His father died in 1910 and he and his mother moved to Brooklyn. He went to school at Miner's Business Academy, New York University and City College. After school he worked as an export manager for McKesson and Robins, was a salesman for Baker and Taylor Publishing and was sales manager for Viking Press. From 1918 to 1919 he was owner of a bookshop.

In 1928, he published his first novel, Better Bridge, followed in 1930 by The Manville Murders, which "shows great originality and is "considered one of the jewels of the L'Empreinte collection." This novel tells of the violent and inexorable end of the last members of a degenerate family.

In 1936, his second novel translated into French, L'Écouteur invisible (The Whispering Window) is a plot "pure product of the 'If I had known' school fashioned by Mary Roberts Rinehart". Nevertheless, "even if this novel can be interpreted as a skilful pastiche of the works of Rinehart and Mignon G. Eberhart, it is far from the bloody anarchy of the first title."

From 1936 to 1942, he wrote several scripts for the cinema. Some of his notable movies include, The Mandarin Mystery, Racing Lady and Earl Carroll Vanities.

He died in Los Angeles in 1949. His papers can be found at the special collections library at UCLA.

== Works ==
=== Books ===
- Better Bridge, (1928)
- The Manville Murders, (1930)
- 70,000 Witnesses: A Football Mystery, (1931)
- The Bainbridge Murder, (1932)
- No Witness, (1932)
- Red Rhapsody, (1933)
- Death On The Diamond: A Baseball Mystery, (1934)
- Crimson Ice: A Hockey Mystery, (1935)
- The Whispering Window, (1936)
- The Longest Night, (1936)
- The Moving Finger, (1937)
- Mystery At Hidden Harbor, (1938)
- Sudden Silence: The Case Of The Murdered Bandleader, (1938)
- The Girl In The Cage, (1939) [with John MULHOLLAND]
- One Man's Poison, (1940)
- The Evil Men Do, (1941)
- This Is Murder, (1941) [with Gerald ADAMS]
- Death Rings A Bell, (1942)
- Tied For Murder, (1943)
- You Can Cook If You Can Read, (1946) [with Muriel Fitzsimmons]

=== Screenplays ===
- The Mandarin Mystery (1936)
- Jim Hanvey, Detective (1936) [Story adaptation]
- Racing Lady (1937)
- Earl of Puddlestone (1940)
- All-American Co-Ed (1941)
- Fiesta (1941)
- The Devil with Hitler (1942)
- Earl Carroll Vanities (1945)
