= Annabel Takes a Tour =

1938 film

- Directed by: Lew Landers
- Written by: Joe Bigelow (story); Olive Cooper (writer)
- Produced by: Lou Lusty
- Starring: Jack Oakie; Lucille Ball; Ruth Donnelly
- Cinematography: Russell Metty
- Edited by: Harry Marker
- Music by: Robert Russell Bennett (uncredited)
- Production company: RKO Radio Pictures
- Distributed by: RKO Radio Pictures
- Release date: November 11, 1938 (United States)
- Running time: 67 minutes
- Country: United States
- Language: English

Annabel Takes a Tour is a 1938 American comedy film directed by Lew Landers and starring Lucille Ball, Jack Oakie and Ruth Donnelly. Annabel (Lucille Ball) is on a promotional tour and, as a publicity stunt, leaks a story that she is having a romantic fling with a famous romance novelist. The film is a sequel to The Affairs of Annabel.

== Plot ==
Frustrated at being upstaged in the press by a colleague who's making headlines with her aristocratic fiancé, movie star Annabel Allison insists that studio chief Howard Webb rehire dangerously resourceful publicist Lanny Morgan. Allison, Morgan, Josephine, and Poochy depart by train for Chicago on a public-appearance tour in conjunction with the premiere of Allison's latest film. Morgan accidentally sends Allison through a trap door as she addresses the Chicago audience, and he attempts unsuccessfully to capitalize on the mishap for PR purposes by exaggerating Allison's injuries. While recuperating in her hotel, Allison learns that author Ronald River-Clyde is staying down the hall, and she realizes his aristocratic title could solve her publicity problems. She and Morgan work independently to manipulate River-Clyde into a high-profile date with Annabel; but when Annabel gets so carried away with her fantasies of accommodating the viscount's presumed loftiness that she decides to shun publicity, she finds herself at cross purposes with her press agent. While Annabel pursues a quiet relationship with River-Clyde, Lanny keeps trying to push them into the spotlight. Meanwhile, an initially baffled River-Clyde has been persuaded by his publisher to use Annabel for his own publicity, so he does not resist Annabel's romantic pursuit of him. When Annabel goes so far as to give up her career, Morgan tries to break up the romance, for which purpose he engages a hotel manicurist with Hollywood ambitions to confront River-Clyde onstage at Annabel's rescheduled premiere, claiming to be an abandoned wife. The manicurist is a dolt and the stunt does not come off; but, immediately thereafter, River-Clyde is confronted by his real wife and children, who have traveled from England to intervene, with legal assistance. Annabel and her entourage escape the process server by boarding a train. When Morgan discovers that River-Clyde and his family are also on the train, he disconnects the caboose so that Annabel and her party drift free.

== Cast ==
- Jack Oakie as Lanny Morgan
- Lucille Ball as Annabel Allison
- Ruth Donnelly as Josephine 'Jo'
- Bradley Page as Howard Webb, Chief of Wonder Pictures
- Ralph Forbes as Viscount Ronald River-Clyde
- Frances Mercer as Natalie Preston
- Donald MacBride as Thompson, RR Conductor
- Alice White as Marcella, Hotel Manicurist
- Chester Clute as Pitcarin, Rodney-Marlborough Hotel Manager
- Jean Rouverol as Laura Hampton
- Clare Verdera as Viscountess River-Clyde
- Edward Gargan as Longshoreman at dance
- Pepito Pérez as Poochy the Accordion Player
- Cecil Kellaway as Strothers (uncredited)
