= Gladys Atwater =

American screenwriter

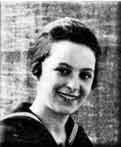
- Born: Gladys Elizabeth Valerga; August 12, 1899; Oakland, California, USA
- Died: March 25, 1988 (aged 88); Los Angeles, California, USA
- Occupation: Screenwriter
- Spouses: Curtis Atwater (divorced): J. Robert Bren

Gladys Atwater (born Gladys Valerga, 1899–1988) was an American screenwriter active from the 1930s through the 1950s. She was sometimes credited as G.V. Atwater.

== Biography ==
Gladys was one of five daughters born to Thomas Valerga and Hannah Surphlis in Oakland, California. Valerga attended Oakland High School, and graduated from the school in June 1917. In Oakland, she married Curtiss Atwater in 1922.

By 1940, Gladys had obtained a divorce and moved to Beverly Hills, where she began working for film studios. Her first known contribution while under contract at RKO was to the 1937 screenplay for Criminal Lawyer, which she co-wrote with Tom Lennon.

Through the 1960s, she continued working, often collaborating with writer-producer (and second husband) J. Robert Bren. Together, they had a company called Bremex and worked on more than 60 scripts and stories together.

== Selected filmography ==
- The Treasure of Pancho Villa (1955)
- Overland Pacific (1954)
- The Great Sioux Uprising (1953)
- El Paso (1949)
- First Yank into Tokyo (1945)
- American Empire (1942)
- Underground Agent (1942)
- In Old California (1942)
- Argentine Nights (1940)
- Parents on Trial (1939)
- Five Little Peppers and How They Grew (1939)
- Crime Ring (1938)
- This Marriage Business (1938)
- Crashing Hollywood (1938)
- Criminal Lawyer (1937) (as G.V. Atwater)
- The Man Who Found Himself (1937) (as G.V. Atwater)
