= Alice Turner Curtis =

American novelist

- Born: Alice L. Turner; September 6, 1860; Sullivan, Hancock, Maine, United States
- Died: July 10, 1958 (aged 97)
- Resting place: Southside Cemetery, Skowhegan, Maine
- Other names: Mrs. Irving Curtis
- Occupation: Author

Alice Turner Curtis (September 6, 1860 – July 10, 1958) was an American writer of juvenile historical fiction. She was probably best remembered by young readers of her day for The Little Maid's Historical Series (which comprises twenty-four books, starting with A Little Maid of Province Town). She has written at least sixty published books (most of them were originally published by The Penn Publishing Company).

== Family ==
Alice Turner was born in Sullivan, Maine, the youngest known child of John Vinal Turner (June 6, 1802 – December 31, 1886) and Susan Ann Spear (4 January 1824 – 26/27 May 1901). Her father and another relative (George D. Turner) were sailmakers. Reverend Charles R. Tenney married Alice to Irving Curtis (January 18, 1837 – November 18, 1910) on May 20, 1895, in Boston, Massachusetts, where they both resided at the time. She was listed in Daughters of the American Revolution, much as her father's father, Fobes Turner (October 26, 1766 – 1846) was listed in Sons of the American Revolution. She had at least three siblings (John V., Anna or Annie S., and Ella F., who were also born in Sullivan, Maine). She dedicated Marjorie in the Sunny South to her sister, Anna (see the front matter of the book itself).

== Life and education ==
She went to public schools in Maine and Massachusetts, but was also tutored privately. She was a Republican in 1936, and a supporter of women's suffrage. She was a member of D.A.R. (Tea Party Chapter, Boston), and the New England Women's Club, Boston. She was also a salaried contributor to Youth's Companion. She enjoyed reading, walking, and housekeeping for recreation. Although her earliest-known book (Marjorie's Way) was published in 1904, she had been in the literary profession by 1895 according to her marriage record.

== Works ==
=== The Little Maids historical series ===
- A Little Maid of Province Town (AKA Anne Nelson, Little Maid of Provincetown), 1910, 1913, 1916, 1922, 1925, 1954, 1997
- A Little Maid of Massachusetts Colony, 1914, 1915, 1916, 1924, 1951, 1996
- A Little Maid of Narragansett Bay, 1915, 1920, 1925, 1928, 1954, 1998
- A Little Maid of Bunker Hill, 1916, 1920, 1927, 1929, 1952
- A Little Maid of Ticonderoga, 1917, 1924, 1927, 1954, 1996
- A Little Maid of Old Connecticut, 1918, 1920, 1953, 1996
- A Little Maid of Old Philadelphia, 1919, 1921, 1955, 1996
- A Little Maid of Old Maine, 1920, 1926, 1953, 1999
- A Little Maid of Old New York, 1921, 1924, 1951, 1996
- A Little Maid of Virginia, 1922, 1925, 1951, 1953, 1998
- A Little Maid of Maryland, 1923, 1926, 1952, 1997
- A Little Maid of Mohawk Valley, 1924, 1928, 1944, 1952, 1999
- A Little Maid of Monmouth, 1925, 1953
- A Little Maid of Nantucket, 1926, 1929, 1950
- A Little Maid of Vermont, 1927, 1948, 1952
- A Little Maid of New Hampshire, 1928, 1954
- A Little Maid of South Carolina, 1929, 1952
- A Little Maid of New Orleans, 1930, 1949
- A Little Maid of Fort Pitt, 1931, 1953
- A Little Maid of Lexington, 1932, 1955
- A Little Maid of Boston, 1933, 1954
- A Little Maid of Newport, 1935, 1955
- A Little Maid of Quebec, 1936, 1954, 1955
- A Little Maid of Valley Forge, 1937, 1951

=== The Yankee Girl Civil War Stories series ===
- A Yankee Girl at Fort Sumter, 1920
- A Yankee Girl at Bull Run, 1921
- A Yankee Girl at Shiloh, 1922, 2002
- A Yankee Girl at Antieam, 1923
- A Yankee Girl at Gettysburg (AKA Kathleen), 1925
- A Yankee Girl at Vicksburg, 1926
- A Yankee Girl at Hampton Roads, 1927
- A Yankee Girl at Lookout Mountain, 1928
- A Yankee Girl at the Battle of the Wilderness, 1929
- A Yankee Girl at Richmond, 1930

=== Frontier Girl series ===
- A Frontier Girl of Virginia, 1929
- A Frontier Girl of Massachusetts, 1930
- A Frontier Girl of New York, 1931
- A Frontier Girl of Chesapeake Bay, 1934
- A Frontier Girl of Pennsylvania, 1937

=== Grandpa's Little Girls series ===
- Grandpa's Little Girls, 1907
- Grandpa's Little Girls at School, 1908
- Grandpa's Little Girls and Their Friends, 1909
- Grandpa's Little Girls House-boat Party, 1909, 1910
- Grandpa's Little Girls and Miss Abitha, 1911
- Grandpa's Little Girls Grown Up, 1912, 1920

=== The Little Heroine series ===
- A Little Heroine of Illinois, 1908
- The Little Heroine at School, 1909

=== The Little Runnaways series ===
- The Little Runnaways, 1905, 1906
- The Little Runnaways and Mother, 1913
- The Little Runnaways at Orchard House, 1914, 1920
- The Little Runnaways at Home, 1916

=== The Marjorie series ===
- Marjorie's Way, 1904, 1905
- Marjorie's Schooldays, 1911, 1914, 1926
- Marjorie in the Sunny South, 1912
- Marjorie on Beacon Hill, 1913, 1926

=== Unknown series title ===
Although only one book in this series is known to be written by Alice Turner Curtis, she did write the first of them (The Story of Cotton). These are novels, much as most of her other works.

- The Story of Cotton, 1911, by Alice Turner Curtis
- The Story of Gold and Silver, 1920, by Elizabeth Ida Samuel
- The Story of Lumber, 1920, by Sara Ware Bassett
- The Story of Wool, 1913, 1917, by Sara Ware Bassett
- The Story of Iron, 1920, by Elizabeth Ida Samuel
- The Story of Leather, 1915, 1917, by Sara Ware Bassett
- The Story of Glass, 1916, by Sara Ware Bassett
- The Story of Sugar, by 1920, 1926, by Sara Ware Bassett
- The Story of Silk, 1920, by Sara Ware Bassett
- The Story of Porcelain, 1919, by Sara Ware Bassett
- The Story of Wheat (unknown author and publication date)
- The Story of Linen (unknown author and publication date)

=== Other ===
- The Outdoor Chums, 1913
- Miss Ann and Jimmy, 1916
- Ted Gilman, 1916
- A Challenge to Adventure, 1919
- Stories of the Civil War (mentioned at the beginning of A Little Maid of Virginia, 1922)

She also wrote short stories in Century Magazine, by 1915
