= Nathanael West bibliography =

List of Writing Works by American Writer Nathanael West

This is a bibliography of works by Nathanael West

== Novels ==
The Dream Life of Balso Snell, 1931

Title	Publisher	Included in
The Dream Life of Balso Snell	Contact Editions, 1931	The Complete works of Nathanael West,1957. Novels and other Writings, 1997
Miss Lonelyhearts	Liveright, 1933	The Complete works of Nathanael West,1957. Novels and other Writings, 1997
A Cool Million	Covici Friede, 1934	The Complete works of Nathanael West,1957. Novels and other Writings, 1997
The Day of the Locust	Random House, 1939	The Complete works of Nathanael West,1957. Novels and other Writings, 1997

== Short stories and novel excerpts ==
Title	First Published in	Notes
"A Barefaced Lie"	Overland Monthly, 1929
"Miss Lonelyhearts and the Lamb"	Contact, February 1932	Excerpt from Miss Lonelyhearts
"Miss Lonelyhearts and the Dead Pan"	Contact, May 1932	Excerpt from Miss Lonelyhearts
"Miss Lonelyhearts and the Clean Old Man"	Contact, May 1932	Excerpt from Miss Lonelyhearts
"Miss Lonelyhearts in the Dismal Swamp"	Contempo, July 1932	Excerpt from Miss Lonelyhearts
"Miss Lonelyhearts on a Field Trip"	Contact, October 1932	Excerpt from Miss Lonelyhearts
"The Dear Public"	Americana, August 1933	Excerpt from The Dream Life of Balso Snell
Unnamed excerpt	Americana, September 1933	Excerpt from The Dream Life of Balso Snell
"Business Deal"	Americana, October 1933	Collected in Novels and other Writings, 1997
"Bird and Bottle"	Pacific Weekly, November 1936	Early section of The Day of the Locust; collected in Nathanael West: A Collection of Critical Essays
"The Imposter"	The New Yorker, June 2, 1997	Originally titled "The Fake", then retitled "L'Affaire Beano"; collected in Novels and other Writings, 1997
"Western Union Boy"	–	Collected in Novels and other Writings, 1997
"Mr. Potts of Pottstown"	–	Incomplete; collected in Novels and other Writings, 1997
"The Adventurer"	–	Incomplete; collected in Novels and other Writings, 1997
"Three Eskimos"	–	Used in The Day of the Locust; collected in Novels and other Writings, 1997
"Tibetan Night"	–	Collected in Novels and other Writings, 1997
"The Sun, the Lady, and the Gas Station"	–

== Plays ==
Title	Year	in Collaboration with	First performance	Published in
Even Stephen	1934	S. J. Perelman	never performed	never published
Good Hunting	1938	Joseph Schrank	November 21, 1938, New York	Novels and other Writings, 1997

== Poetry ==
Title	First published in	Notes
"Rondeau"	The Brown Jug, 2, December 1922
"Death"	Casements, May 1924	Signed N. von Wallenstein-Weinstein
Christmass Poem	Contempo, February 1933	Early version of "Burn the Cities"
"Burn the Cities"	–	Included in Novels and other Writings, 1997

== Essays and reviews ==
Title	Publication details	Included in:
Euripides—A Playwright	Casements, July 1923	Novels and other Writings
Book Marks for Today	World Telegram, October 1931	–
Through the Hole in the Mundane Millstone	A leaflet by Contact Editions printed in 1931 to promote The Dream Life of Balso Snell	Novels and other Writings; Nathanael West: A Collection of Critical Essays
Some Notes on Violence	Contact, October 1932	Novels and other Writings; Nathanael West: A Collection of Critical Essays
Some Notes on Miss L.	Contempo, May 1933	Novels and other Writings; Nathanael West: A Collection of Critical Essays
Soft Soap for the Barber	The New Republic, November 1934	Novels and other Writings

== Film writing ==
(in collaboration with others, unless noted otherwise)

Title	year	Studio	Format	Notes
Beauty Parlor	Written 1933	Columbia	Screenplay	Never produced
Return to the Soil	Written 1933	Columbia	Screenplay	Never produced
Osceola	Written 1935	–	Treatment	Never produced
Ticket to Paradise	1936	Republic Productions	Treatment and screenplay
Follow Your Heart	1936	Republic Productions	Screenplay
The President's Mystery	1936	Republic Productions	Screenplay
Rhythm in the Clouds	1937	Republic Productions	Screenplay
It Could Happen to You	1937	Republic Productions	Screenplay
Jim Hanvey – Detective	1937	Republic Productions	Screenplay	Uncredited
Born to Be Wild	1938	Republic Productions	Screenplay
Gangs of New York	1938	Republic Productions	Screenplay	Uncredited
Ladies in Distress	1938	Republic Productions	Screenplay	Uncredited
Bachelor Girl	written 1937	Republic Productions	Screenplay	Never produced
Orphans of the Street	1938	Republic Productions	Treatment and screenplay	Uncredited
Stormy Weather	Written 1937-8	Republic Productions	Treatment and partial screenplay	Never Produced
The Squealer	1938	Columbia	Screenplay	Unfinished
Flight South	Written 1938	MGM	Treatment	Never produced
The Spirit of Culver	1939	Universal Studios	Screenplay
Five Came Back	1939	RKO Pictures	Screenplay
I Stole a Million	1939	Universal Studios	Screenplay	Solo screenwriting credit
The Victoria Docks at Eight	Written 1939	Universal Studios	Screenplay	Never filmed
Stranger on the Third Floor	1940	RKO Pictures	Screenplay	Uncredited
Men Against the Sky	1940	RKO Pictures	Screenplay	Solo screenwriting credit
Let's Make Music	1941	RKO Pictures	Screenplay	Solo screenwriting credit
Before the Fact	Written 1939	RKO Pictures	Screenplay	Never filmed
A Cool Million	Written 1940	Columbia	Screen story	Never produced
Bird in Hand	Written 1940	RKO Pictures	Treatment
Amateur Angel	Written 1940	Columbia	Screenplay	worked on until his death

== Collections ==
Title	Year	Publisher	Notes
The Complete Works of Nathanael West	1957	Farrar Straus and Company	Reprinted in 1963, 1975; includes the four novels
A Cool Million & The Dream Life of Balso Snell	1961	Farrar Straus and Company
Miss Lonelyhearts & The Day of the Locust	1969	New Directions
Nathanael West: A Collection of Critical Essays	1971	Prentice Hall (20th century Views series)	Includes three essays and one story by West in addition to critical writings about him.
Novels and other Writings	1997	Library of America	Includes novels, short stories, essays, and a selection of letters

== Books about Nathanael West ==
Title	Writer	Year	Genre
Nathanael West	Stanley Edgar Hyman	1962	Critical Study
Nathanael West, the Ironic Prophet	Victor Comerchero	1964	Critical Study
The Fiction of Nathanael West, No Redeemer, No Promised land	Randall Reid	1967	Critical Study
Nathanael West: The Art of His Life	Jay Martin	1971	Biography
Nathanael West: An Interpretative Study	James F. Light	1971	Critical Study
Nathanael West	Robert Emmet Long	1985	Critical Study
Lonelyhearts: The Screwball World of Nathanael West and Eileen McKenney	Marion Meade	2010	Biography of West and his wife

== Adaptations of Nathanael West's work ==
Title	Adaptation of	Year	Format
Advice to the Lovelorn	Miss Lonelyhearts	1933	Feature Film
I'll Tell the World	Miss Lonelyhearts	1945	Feature Film
Miss Lonelyhearts	Miss Lonelyhearts	1957	Play
Lonelyhearts	Miss Lonelyhearts	1958	Feature Film
Miss Lonelyhearts	Miss Lonelyhearts	1983	TV film
The Day of the Locust	The Day of the Locust	1975	Feature Film
Miss Lonelyhearts	Miss Lonelyhearts	2006	Opera
