= Good Hunting =

Good Hunting may refer to:

- Good Hunting, a play written by Nathanael West, in collaboration with Joseph Schrank
- Earlier title of short story "Red Dog" by Rudyard Kipling (also frequently used phrase in Kipling's The Jungle Book and The Second Jungle Book)
