= Stanley Rose =

Stanley Rose (December 5, 1899 – October 17, 1954) was an American bookseller, literary agent, and raconteur, whose eponymous Hollywood bookshop, located (from 1935 until its closure in 1939) adjacent to the famous Musso & Frank Grill restaurant, was a gathering place for writers working or living in and around Hollywood. Rose's most notable literary associates were William Saroyan, to whom he was variously a friend, a drinking and hunting companion, and a literary representative; and Nathanael West, whose 1939 novel The Day of the Locust owed much of its “local color” to its author's acquaintance with Rose.

== Background and early career ==
Stanley Rose was born in Matador, Texas. He served in the United States Army during World War I, and was said to have received an injury to his throat that necessitated treatment at a veterans’ hospital in Palo Alto, California, near Stanford University—from which, according to historian Kevin Starr, Rose “absorbed the atmosphere of books as if by osmosis.” By the mid-1920s, he had moved to Los Angeles and entered the book trade, most successfully as an itinerant supplier of books to writers and executives at the Hollywood studios; according to at least one account, he also operated as a bootlegger, smuggling his liquor deliveries into the studios in the false bottoms of the suitcases he used to make his book deliveries. (Many accounts also claim that he sold erotic or pornographic literature as well.) By the late 1920s, he had become a partner in the Satyr Book Shop, which had opened in 1926 on Hudson Street and subsequently moved to a prime location on Vine Street near the Hollywood Brown Derby restaurant. The Satyr partnership dissolved after Rose took the rap for his partners by pleading guilty to a violation of the Copyright Act related to their publication of a pirated edition of a popular risqué humor book of the day, The Specialist by Charles "Chic" Sale. After serving a short jail sentence, Rose opened his own bookshop on the opposite side of Vine Street from the Satyr.

== Stanley Rose Book Shop ==
Rose operated his bookshop on Vine Street and at one other location (on Selma Avenue) for about four years prior to moving, in January 1935, to what would become its final and most memorable site, at 6661½ Hollywood Boulevard, a few doors east of the Musso & Frank Grill restaurant. Even before this time, the shop had begun to attract many screenwriters and novelists, who came seeking not just books, but also the congenial company of their fellows and of Rose himself, but the move to the Hollywood Boulevard location helped to solidify its status as a kind of unofficial “clubhouse” for writers. California historian Kevin Starr has written: “The bookshop and the bar [at Musso & Frank] operated together with superb synergy, creating a welcomed sense of community for screenwriters suffering from an understandable sense of displacement.” Less often mentioned but also important was that the Screen Writers' Guild was located directly across the boulevard.

Among the writers known to have been regular patrons of the Rose shop were William Saroyan, William Faulkner, Nathanael West, Jim Tully, Gene Fowler, James M. Cain, Frank Fenton, Horace McCoy, Erskine Caldwell, John Fante, Louis Adamic, A. I. Bezzerides, and Budd Schulberg. Many others have had their names linked with the shop by various historians and biographers, despite having probably been no more than occasional customers; in this group are Raymond Chandler, Dashiell Hammett, John O'Hara, Dorothy Parker, Aldous Huxley, Ben Hecht, and F. Scott Fitzgerald. Rose also cultivated a well-heeled clientele from other segments of the Hollywood community; the actors and other prominent celebrities who frequented the shop included Charlie Chaplin, John Barrymore, Edward G. Robinson, W. C. Fields, Marion Davies, Jean Harlow, and Marlene Dietrich.

=== Back room ===
The “back room” of Rose's shop is a central element of the legend surrounding the shop. This small area served variously as an art gallery, informal discussion room, and unlicensed bar (where Rose would serve orange wine to his friends); in Budd Schulberg's memorable phrase, it was “the nearest thing we had to a salon (and also a saloon).” Because Musso & Frank's restaurant had its own semiprivate rear dining area/bar, which also catered to writers, the two “back rooms” are referred to almost interchangeably in many historical accounts and memoirs of the period. These writer-friendly environments inspired the title of Edmund Wilson's 1941 monograph, The Boys in the Back Room: Notes on California Novelists, in which the work of Cain, O’Hara, Saroyan, West, and Schulberg, among others, is discussed. The art gallery, for its part, was regarded as one of the more receptive venues in Los Angeles for avant garde or modernist works, and presented some of the earliest exhibits by American artists such as Herman Cherry, Philip Guston, Lorser Feitelson, Helen Lundeberg, and Knud Merrild; on occasion, the work of significant European and Mexican artists was featured, as well.

== Association with Hollywood ==
=== As a character ===
Many accounts of Stanley Rose's personality were published, perhaps the most vivid of which is that provided by his longtime friend and associate, Carey McWilliams:

Stanley was a superb storyteller and a very funny man whose generosity was proverbial. In the late afternoons, as he began to warm up for the evening with a few drinks, he would hold court in the store, entertaining whoever happened to drop in, and the performance would invariably continue into the early morning hours in the back room at Musso’s. ... Uneducated but of great native charm, he was forever being lured on expensive hunting and fishing trips by wealthy actors, writers, and directors on their promises to buy large libraries of books, which of course they never did; they merely wanted him along as court jester. Stanley dressed like a Hollywood swell, spoke like the Texas farm boy he never ceased to be, and carried on as Hollywood’s unrivaled entertainer and easiest touch until his death in 1954.

Although a convivial companion, Rose, by the accounts of McWilliams and many others, was not an especially savvy businessman. Budd Schulberg reported that Rose once told an inquisitive writer that he only ran a bookstore "cause I like to keep a joint where my pals c’n hang out." He was prone to letting his many friends have books “on account”, and was extremely lax in the collection of monies owed him. Actor William Bakewell remembered that Rose's "generosity and easygoing approach to merchandising stimulated a kind of mañana attitude on the part of many of his customers, resulting in a host of long-overdue accounts, which finally put him out of business."

=== In literature ===
Rose and his bookshop make cameo appearances in several prominent literary works in the "Hollywood novel" genre, including What Makes Sammy Run? by Budd Schulberg (1941) and The Day of the Locust by Nathanael West (1939). The protagonist of John O'Hara's 1938 novel Hope of Heaven has an affair with a bookstore clerk; although the fictionalized shop is located in Beverly Hills, the character of the clerk is a thinly disguised portrait of Betty Anderson, a Rose employee with whom O’Hara had been briefly infatuated. Some critics of Raymond Chandler's work have identified the Rose shop as the model (or at least the inspiration) for the bookstore "Geiger's" in Chandler's The Big Sleep, published in 1939. William Saroyan, generally regarded as Rose's best friend among the writers, wrote various short pieces about Rose and the bookshop, and anecdotes about "Stanley the bookseller" pop up in many of his published works. The bookshop and its proprietor also figure in numerous writers’ memoirs, including those by John Bright, Lester Cole, John Sanford, Budd Schulberg, and others.

== Later life and death ==
Rose's haphazard approach to business led to the closure of the shop in mid-1939—a month after the publication of Nathanael West's acerbic novel about the underbelly of Hollywood life, The Day of the Locust, much of the atmosphere for which had been gathered by West through his acquaintance with Rose. Following the failure of his shop, Rose set up shop as a literary agent, although his only really notable (and successful) client was his friend William Saroyan. Rose claimed to have negotiated a contract between Saroyan and MGM for the filming of Saroyan's The Human Comedy, although Saroyan himself claimed that it had essentially been an act of charity on his part to employ Rose as an agent, and that he played only a minor role in the transaction. In any event, Rose enjoyed only intermittent success as a writers’ representative, and eventually his heavy drinking took a toll on his health. According to Hollywood journalist Bob Thomas, he spent the last several years of his life in and out of various veterans’ hospitals, and was virtually penniless at the time of his death in 1954. In a brief tribute written at the time, Thomas observed that “Stanley was never rich in terms of material wealth. But his life was rich in legend and few men had more friends. ... As far as I can judge, he had only one enemy and that was John Barleycorn.” Saroyan was more direct, telling his cousin that Rose “died of drink, boredom and loneliness.” The same year his bookshop closed, 1939, Stanley had married Maude Nicol, although they were living apart at the time of his death; he was survived by her and their son, Bruce.

== See also ==
- Larry Edmunds Bookshop
- Pickwick Book Shop
- Satyr Book Shop
