= Musso & Frank Grill =

Hollywood restaurant open since 1919

Coordinates: 34.10171°N 118.33540°W

- Interactive map of Musso & Frank Grill

Restaurant information
- Established: 1919
- Food type: Steakhouse, American
- Location: 6667-9 Hollywood Boulevard, Los Angeles, Los Angeles, California, United States
- Reservations: Yes
- Other locations: No
- Website: mussoandfrank.com

Musso & Frank Grill is a restaurant located at 6667-9 Hollywood Boulevard in the Hollywood neighborhood of Los Angeles. The restaurant opened in 1919 and is named for original owners Joseph Musso and Frank Toulet. It is the oldest restaurant in Hollywood and has been called "the genesis of Hollywood".

== History ==
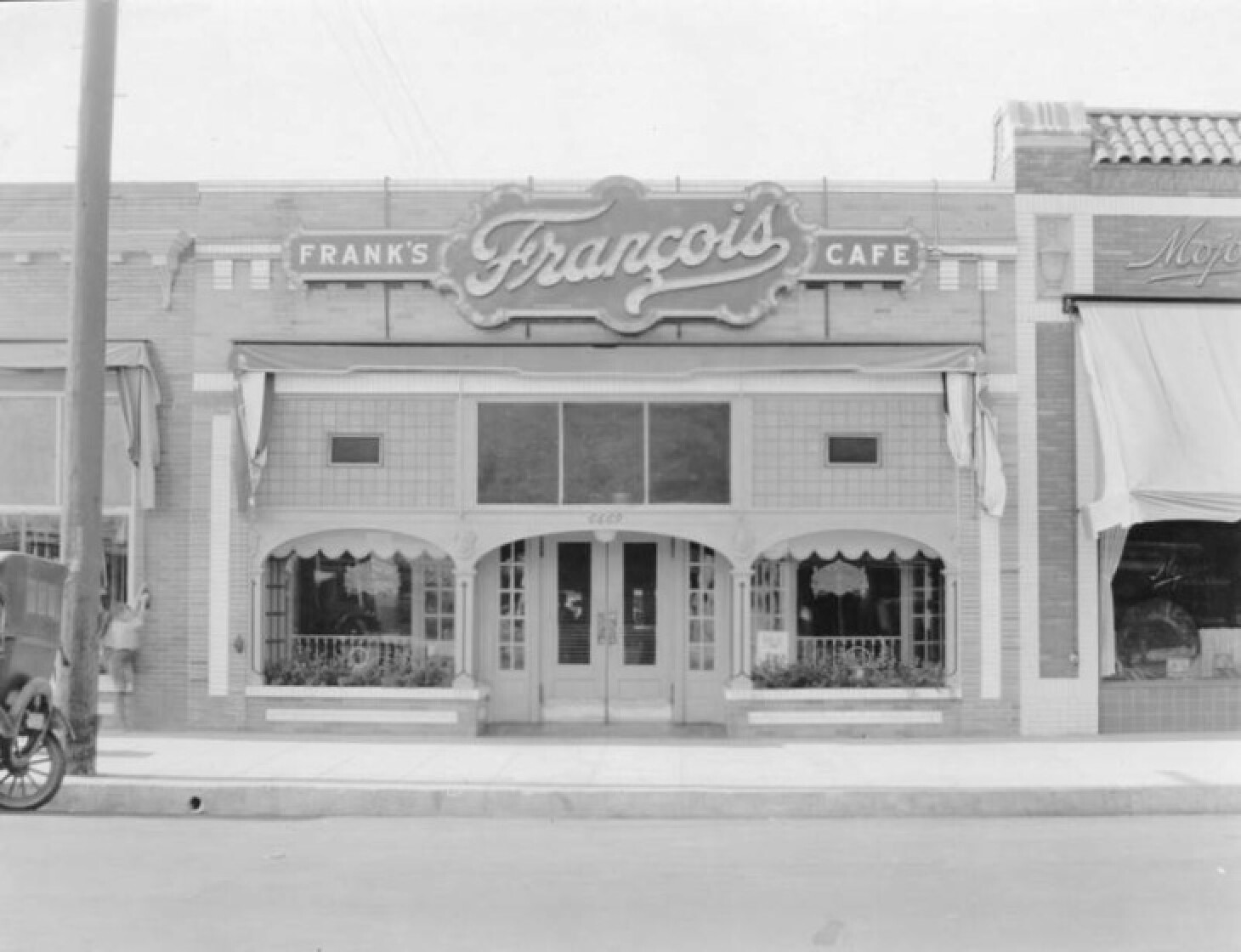
Frank's François Café, predecessor to Musso & Frank, in 1920

The restaurant was founded by French immigrant Firmin "Frank" Toulet as Frank's François Café at 6669 Hollywood Boulevard. In 1923, the name was changed to Musso & Frank to reflect Toulet's new partnership with Joseph Musso.

In 1927, the restaurant was sold to Joseph Carissimi and John Mosso (no relation to Musso). In 1936, Mosso expanded the restaurant to include 6667 Hollywood Blvd. The big room on the east side of the restaurant, opened in 1955, is still called "the new room". The Carissimi family eventually sold their interest in the restaurant to the Mosso family and the restaurant is still owned by the descendants of John Mosso and is managed by his great-grandson Mark Echeverria. The restaurant has kept its original character, which includes high ceilings, dark wood paneling, and red booths. Its waiters and bartenders dress in the same red coats that they have worn for decades. Musso & Frank is now considered a classic "New York-style bar and restaurant".

In 2008, GQ declared Musso & Frank as the best place to have a martini in America, and 2018, the restaurant served 55,272 of them.

In 2019, Musso & Frank celebrated its 100th anniversary and also became the first restaurant to be given a star on the Hollywood Walk of Fame. In 2021, the restaurant expanded its seating capacity for the first time in 66 years with the addition of two private dining rooms.

== Menu ==
In 1927, Musso & Frank became the first restaurant in the United States to serve fettuccine Alfredo. The recipe had been obtained by Mary Pickford and Douglas Fairbanks on their honeymoon in Italy, and upon their return, they passed the recipe onto the Musso & Frank chef, requesting the dish be made for them. Years later, the dish was added to the menu.

Musso & Frank has maintained its classic decor and its classic steakhouse-style menu, which includes such dishes as Welsh rarebit, lobster Thermidor, and chicken pot pie, available only on Thursdays.

== Cultural role ==
When Musso and Frank opened in 1919, the political and financial life of Los Angeles was centered in Downtown Los Angeles, which was a difficult journey at that time. This made it possible for the restaurant to attract the more bohemian and intellectual clientele who were starting to spend time in Hollywood.

=== Literature, theatre and politics ===
By the 1930s, Musso and Frank was firmly established at the center of Hollywood's cultural life. The Screen Writers Guild was located across the street, and Stanley Rose's essential bookstore was right next door to the restaurant. Many writers of the hard-boiled fiction that Rose preferred, who hung out in the back room of the bookstore, spent endless hours in the bar of Musso and Frank, including James M. Cain, John Fante (who frequented the restaurant with famed journalist and historian Carey McWilliams), Raymond Chandler, and Nathanael West. Other literary regulars include Ernest Hemingway, William Saroyan, Dashiell Hammett, Erskine Caldwell, Dorothy Parker, William Faulkner, F. Scott Fitzgerald, Elliot Paul, Gore Vidal, and Donald Ogden Stewart. The restaurant appears in Paul Cain's 1933 hardboiled novel Fast One, as well as Nathanael West's 1939 novel The Day of the Locust. By the 1940s the restaurant was so firmly identified with the Los Angeles literary scene that aspiring writers, e.g. Charles Bukowski, would drink there in a conscious effort to imitate their role models. Eminent California historian Kevin Starr has said that a list of writers who frequented Musso and Frank resembles "the list of required reading for a sophomore survey of the mid-twentieth-century American novel".

Important Los Angeles progressives and communists were identified with Musso and Frank (and Rose's bookstore as well). Future California congresswoman Helen Gahagan Douglas, famous for being defeated by Richard Nixon in a notably dirty 1950 Senate election, ate dinner at Musso and Frank on her first night after moving to Los Angeles with her husband, actor Melvyn Douglas. Noted actor and CPUSA member Will Geer met regularly at Musso and Frank in the late 1930s and 1940s with a group of young radical writers and actors.

=== The film industry ===
From its founding, Musso and Frank has been part of the social life of the Los Angeles film industry. The restaurant kept a separate back room for its film industry clientele, which included not only screenwriters, many of whom are listed above, but actors, producers and directors as well, including Tom Mix, Charlie Chaplin, Harry Warner and his brother Jack, Greta Garbo, Humphrey Bogart, Frank Sinatra, Marlon Brando, Marilyn Monroe, William Frawley, Douglas Fairbanks, Mary Pickford, Orson Welles, Rudolph Valentino, and Budd Schulberg. The restaurant's popularity with industry clientele continues to the present, with modern stars, e.g. Johnny Depp, George Clooney, Brad Pitt, Keith Richards, and Harrison Ford patronizing the restaurant.

== Building ==
- Musso & Frank's
- U.S. Historic district – Contributing property
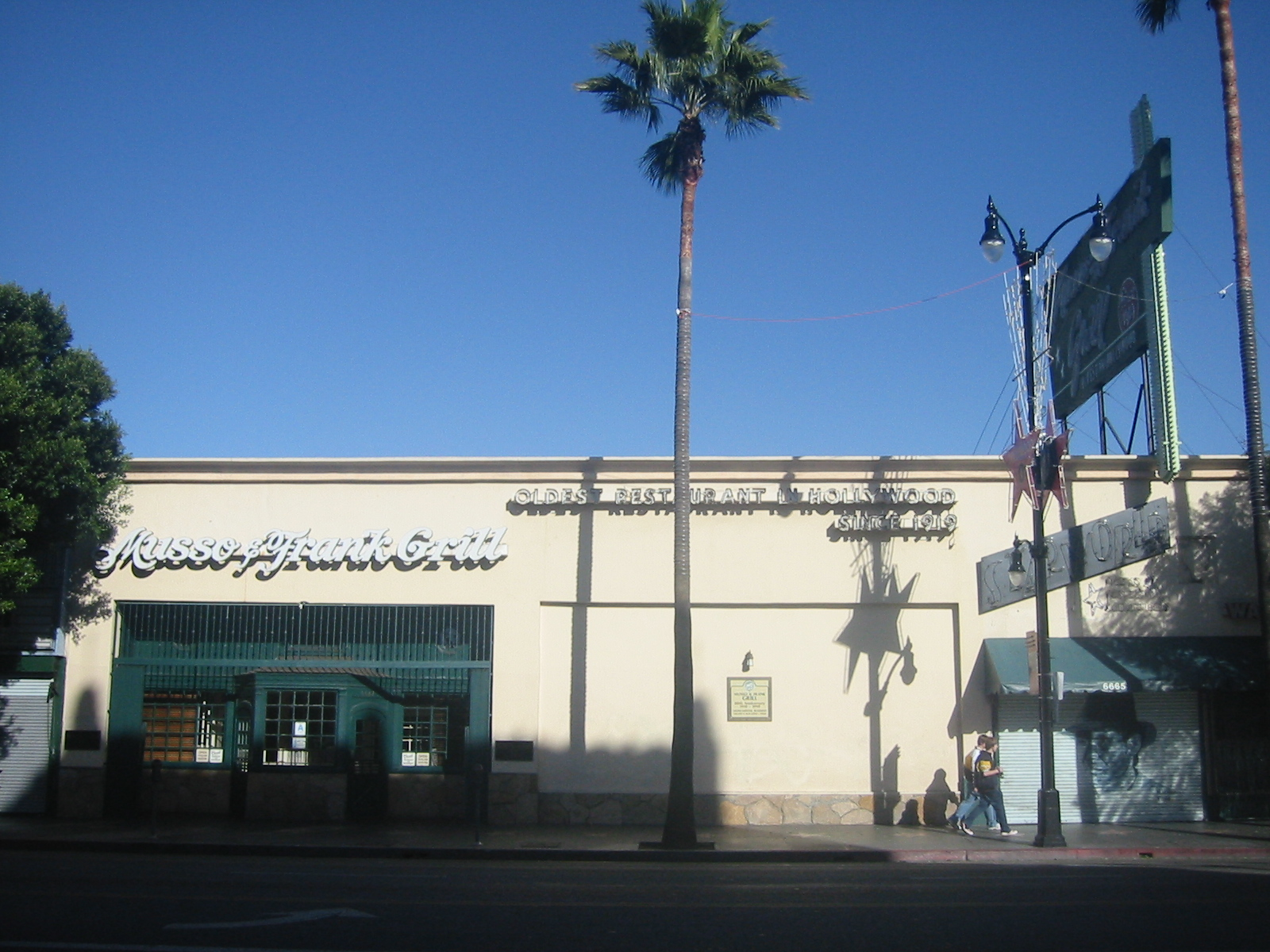
- The building in 2006
- Built: 1917
- Architect: L. A. Smith
- Architectural style: Commercial vernacular
- Part of: Hollywood Boulevard Commercial and Entertainment District (ID85000704)
- Designated CP: April 4, 1985

In 1985, the Hollywood Boulevard Commercial and Entertainment District was added to the National Register of Historic Places, with the Musso & Frank building listed as a contributing property in the district. Aspects of the building cited in the register include its glass brick windows, flagstone wall, recessed entrance, neon sign, and intact interior. The building was designed by L. A. Smith in the commercial vernacular style and built in 1917.

== In popular culture ==
Because of its status as an iconic Los Angeles restaurant, Musso and Frank has been featured in multiple films and television series including Ed Wood (1994), Ocean's Eleven (2001), Greenberg (2010), the Coen brothers' The Man Who Wasn't There (2001), Family Guy (1999–present), Mad Men (2007-2015), The Kominsky Method (2018–2021), Quentin Tarantino's Once Upon a Time in Hollywood (2019), the Amazon Prime Series Bosch (2020), Blonde (2022), and the FX series Better Things. The restaurant is featured in Visiting...with Huell Howser Episode 307.

The restaurant is mentioned in the novels The Day of the Locust (1939), Paul Cain's Fast One (1933), What Makes Sammy Run? (1941), The Seven Husbands of Evelyn Hugo (2017), and The Law of Innocence by Michael Connelly, and by Taylor Swift in her 2025 song "Elizabeth Taylor".

Musso & Frank is listed as one of the "1,000 Places to See Before You Die" in the travel book of the same name by Patricia Schultz.
