= Even Stevens (disambiguation) =

Even Stevens is an American comedy television series.

Even Stevens or variants may also refer to:

- Even Stevens (album), an album by Ray Stevens
- Even Stevens (horse), a Thoroughbred racehorse
- Even Stevens (songwriter), American songwriter
- The Even Stevens Movie, a film based on the TV series
- Even Stephen, a 1934 play
- "Even Steven" (song), a song by Tom Robinson on the 1982 album Cabaret '79

== See also ==
- Evan Stephens, Latter-day Saint composer and hymn writer
- Even Stevphen, a recurring segment on The Daily Show featuring Steve Carell and Stephen Colbert
