= Advice to the Lovelorn =

1933 film directed by Alfred L. Werker

- Directed by: Alfred L. Werker
- Written by: Leonard Praskins
- Based on: Miss Lonelyhearts by Nathanael West
- Produced by: Darryl F. Zanuck
- Starring: Lee Tracy; Sally Blane; Paul Harvey; Sterling Holloway; C. Henry Gordon; Isabel Jewell
- Cinematography: James Van Trees
- Edited by: Allen McNeil
- Music by: Alfred Newman
- Production company: Twentieth Century Pictures
- Distributed by: United Artists
- Release date: December 1, 1933
- Running time: 62 minutes
- Country: United States
- Language: English

Advice to the Lovelorn is a 1933 American pre-Code comedy-drama film directed by Alfred L. Werker and starring Lee Tracy, Sally Blane, Paul Harvey and Sterling Holloway. The film was released on December 1, 1933, by United Artists. It is based on the novel Miss Lonelyhearts by Nathanael West with a number of changes made.

== Plot ==
After Los Angeles reporter Toby Prentiss angers his editor by missing a major story due to being in a drunken stupor, he is assigned as punishment to take over the role of the retiring "Miss Lonelyhearts" advice column. Enraged but contractually-bound, Prentiss tries to get himself deliberately fired by writing a string of replies that offend conventional morality. Instead he proves to be a major success and becomes a syndicated national columnist. This causes considerable difficulties with his girlfriend Louise.

== Cast ==
- Lee Tracy as Toby Prentiss
- Sally Blane as Louise
- Paul Harvey as Gaskell
- Sterling Holloway as Benny
- C. Henry Gordon as Kane
- Isabel Jewell as Rose
- Jean Adair as Mrs. Prentiss
- Clay Clement as Joseph C. Douglas, District Attorney
- May Boley as Miss Lonelyhearts
- Matt Briggs as Richards
- Judith Wood as Cora
- Jimmy Conlin as California Booster
- Adalyn Doyle as Miss Curtis
- Ruth Fallows as Miss Howell
- Wade Boteler as Federal Detective
- Thomas E. Jackson as Federal Detective
- Charles Lane as Circulation Manager
- George Dobbs as Reporter
- Tom Herbert as Reporter
- Franklyn Ardell as Reporter
- Wilfred Lucas as Reporter
- Wilbur Mack as Reporter
- William H. Turner as Reporter
- John Vosper as Reporter
- Billy Wayne as Reporter
- Bonnie Bannon as Girl
