= Western Union Boy =

- Short story by Nathanael West
- Country: United States
- Language: English
- Genre(s): Short story

Publication
- Published in: Nathanael West: Novels & Other Writings
- Publication type: Collection
- Publisher: Library of America
- Media type: Print
- Publication date: 1997 (written in early 1930s)

"Western Union Boy" is a short story written by Nathanael West in the early 1930s; it was not published in West's lifetime and appears only in the Library of America edition of his collected work: Novels & Other Writings.

== Plot summary ==
The story deals with a certain type of people, not defined by occupation but by an added burden they carry:

All Western Union boys do not deliver messages. Some of them are lawyers, writers and so forth. But all of them are busy doing something under their regular occupations, and it is this something that makes them "Western Union boys." What they are doing is failing, mechanically, yet desperately and seriously, they are failing. The mechanical part of it is very important.

Other characteristics of this specific group of people include eagerness, a desire to please and an awareness of their own failure, which at times leads them to laugh at themselves. The central incident of this story concerns F. Winslow, a middle-aged "Western Union boy" who feels that he has failed in life. The story ends with his drunken recollection of an early boyhood failure – a failure that haunts him still, in the form of recurring nightmares. As a boy he fumbled an easy fly ball at a crucial point in a baseball game, and as a result was chased off the field by his cousin with a baseball bat in his hands.

== Interpretation and links to West's life and other works ==
Like many of West's protagonists, "Western Union boys" have everything working against them. In baseball games they are always in right field, which West writes, is another fitting definition for them: "A right fielder always has the sun in his eyes; he always gets a bad bounce; it is the short field and he is always running into the fence". The position of "Western Union Boy" could be seen as West's particular version of the Jewish experience in America, a definition imposed on him by heredity and society, a definition which he could not deny, or alter. John Sanford, West's friend, commented: "more than anyone I ever knew [West] writhed under the accidental curse of his religion… he stands at the head of the list when it comes to suffering under the load".

In the story F. Winslow tries and fails to join Phi Beta Kappa while in real life Nathanael West wanted desperately to join a fraternity at Brown University but could not because he was Jewish. West, like F. Winslow, always played right field and consistently failed to measure up to his athletically superior cousins. The specific baseball game described in the story is fictional, but later in life West would frequently recall a similar incident from his time at Brown University, where the bat-yielding relative is replaced by a throng of angry spectators. Wells Root, a close friend of West, remembers hearing this tale half a dozen times, recalling that everyone had placed bets on the game, which had come down to the final inning with the score tied and the enemy at bat with two outs. At that point the batter hit a long fly towards West:

He put his hands up to catch it and for some inexplicable reason didn't hold them close together. The ball tore through, hit him in the forehead, and bounced into some brush. There was a roar from the crowd and [West] took one look and turned tail. To a man, the crowd had risen, gathered bats, sticks, stones, and anything they could lay hands on and were in hot pursuit. He vanished into some woods and didn't emerge until nightfall. In telling the story he was convinced that if they had caught him they would have killed him.

There is no proof that this event actually transpired but the fact that West has chosen to tell it so many times is in itself significant. Firstly, there is the idea of failure at baseball, the national pastime, which would indicate failure as an American. Secondly, the specific image of the persecuted human fleeing from his tormentors is an all too familiar archetype of pogroms and persecutions. This image would later figure as a key symbol in West's final novel The Day of the Locust. The general notion of a society looking for a scapegoat, and finding one in the form of a hapless fool, would echo in both Miss Lonelyhearts and A Cool Million.

In "Western Union Boy", as in his novels, West keeps an ironic distance from his protagonists. The baseball game is distanced from West and his narrator in its representation as a drunken recollection of a recurring dream. Unlike the anecdote where West is the one being chased, in the transition into fiction he thrusts the event upon a pathetic character and joins his American audience in mockery. Within the framework of this story the mockery seems to be based on the comic events that transpired, rather than strictly at the expanse of the protagonist, who receives the narrator's full sympathy.
