= The Imposter (short story) =

- Short story by Nathanael West
- Country: United States
- Language: English
- Genre(s): Short story

Publication
- Published in: The New Yorker, June 2, 1997; Nathanael West: Novels & Other Writings
- Publication type: Magazine; Collection
- Publisher: Library of America
- Media type: Print
- Publication date: 1997 (written in early 1930s)

"The Imposter" is a short story written by Nathanael West in the early 1930s; it was not published in West's lifetime and first appeared in The New Yorker on June 2, 1997, and in the Library of America edition of West's collected work: Novels & Other Writings. The story, told by a struggling writer and set among the expatriate community in 1920s Paris, deals with a failed sculptor named Beano Walsh, who claims he cannot create his art since the anatomy books are all wrong.

== Plot summary ==
The narrator, a struggling writer, knows that to be accepted among American expatriates in Paris in the 1920s, he has to exhibit a certain madness. Since all the obvious forms of craziness have become passé, he decides to exaggerate normality:

In this land of soft shirts, worn open to the navel, and corduroy trousers, I would wear hard collars and carefully pressed suits of formal, stylish cut, and carry clean gloves and a tightly rolled umbrella. I would have precise, elaborate manners and exhibit pronounced horror at the slightest, public breach of the conventions.

He is an instant hit and gets invited to all the parties. At one event he meets Beano Walsh, who worked on a coal barge in the East River before he got a scholarship from Oscar Hahn to study sculpture in Paris. Since the narrator is broke, Beano invites him to live in his studio, which he shares with a Belgian prostitute who the previous tenant left.

Beano constantly fails at drawing, which sends him into a rage, until he decides to work straight from marble. He fails at that too, smashing a whole truckload in frustration. He studies many anatomy books, but cannot replicate the images, so he destroys them binges. An impending visit by one of Hahn's scouts to check on Beano's progress troubles him and he resolves to present an explanation for his inability to create: he argues all the anatomy books are wrong because they all used models that were five foot ten or less, while the ideal modern man is six feet tall. Beano's solution is to create a new book, and he begins frequenting the morgue in search of a perfect model.

One night, as the narrator and three friends sit among the Americans at the Dome, Beano pulls up in a cab and excitedly tells them he has found his perfect specimen, the corpse of a sailor, which he has brought with him, wrapped in brown paper. The group goes up to the cab to look and are repulsed while Beano boasts loudly, causing a crowd to gather, and tears at the paper until the body is naked. A woman trying to get into the cab sees the corpse and screams, causing policemen to come over. Beano knocks one of the policemen into the gutter and is taken away with the corpse, with the narrator and their friends in tow. At the station Beano is brought before a magistrate and claims he was defending his property, refusing to be separated from the corpse and claiming that to do so would impede the progress of art. The magistrate is amused and says that he, like all the French, loves art and would not stand in its way, and sends Beano to his cell with the corpse. He also instructs the narrator to inform Hahn's agent, and send drawing paper. The narrator calls the agent who promises to bring a French lawyer to the trial.

A crowd gathers for the trial, and the narrator accompanies the turnkey and a few others to fetch Beano. At first they don't see anyone in the cell, and the turnkey sounds the alarm. They find the corpse torn and broken, with one arm skinned, lying on a bench and the floor covered with Beano's crude drawings of the arm. They finally find Beano huddled under the bench with his face to the wall. He won't move or speak and the turnkey and cops have to drag him out. The narrator thinks Beano winks at him, but isn't sure.

Beano isn't arraigned and sent to a hospital in the country by Hahn's agent. The narrator visits him a week later, but can't get him to speak, and goes to the doctor in charge to tell him that Beano is only pretending to be crazy to fool the police. The doctor says that he thought so at first too, but later decided that Beano is truly insane, but since he knew it all along he was able to control what he showed the outside world, until he finally went too far. On the train back to Paris, the narrator suspects that the doctor himself might be crazy, but later decides he must have been right since Beano is still in an asylum.

== Early versions ==
The story was discovered among West's papers after his death in two typescript versions. The first is 22 pages long and was originally titled "The Fake," then retitled "L'Affaire Beano"; the second, an incomplete revision of the first version, is 14 pages long and was titled "L'Affaire Beano" before being retitled "The Imposter." The published version is made up of the revised second typescript, with the conclusion from the original typescript.

== Links to West's life and other works ==
Though West spent a few weeks in Paris in 1926 and met various artists and writers including Max Ernst and Henry Miller, he would later claim that he had in fact lived in poverty there for several years, much like the narrator of this story. The specific "madness" the narrator tries to feign by exaggerating normality is also similar to West's perceived persona while he was a student at Brown University, where he often wore Brooks Brothers suits and was considered a "dandy" by his schoolmates.

The theme of failure, which appears in all of West's novels and seems to infect all of his protagonists, occurs here as well. All of West's characters, including Beano Walsh, fail consistently and regularly, as in the short story "Western Union Boy", where the title implies a certain class of people who cannot help but fail: "What they are doing is failing, mechanically, yet desperately and seriously, they are failing. The mechanical part of it is very important."

The twin themes of art and the deception which may lay at its core link this story to The Dream Life of Balso Snell, where the title character comes across countless artists and writers, who try to present themselves a certain way but may all be charlatans.
