= James Light =

- James Light may refer to:
- James Light (cricketer) (b. 1803), English cricketer
- James Light (director) (1895-1964), American theatre director and actor
- James F. Light (1921-2002), American literary scholar, university vice president, and provost
