= Satyr Book Shop =

Former independent Bookstore in Los Angeles, California

- Industry: Specialty retail
- Founded: 1926
- Founder: William “Milton” Goodhand; Hazel Baker
- Successor: Gilbert's Books
- Headquarters: Los Angeles, United States
- Number of locations: Two
- Area served: Southern California
- Key people: William “Milton” Goodhand; Hazel Baker; Stanley Rose; Edward Gilbert

Satyr Book Shop was an independent bookstore located at 1622 Vine Street, next to the Hollywood Brown Derby, in Hollywood, California. It was notable for its location and its association with Stanley Rose.

== History ==
Satyr Book Shop was opened in 1926 by William “Milton” Goodhand and Hazel Baker. Originally located on Hudson Street, the business moved to its prime location next to the Hollywood Brown Derby at 1622 Vine Street, Hollywood, California soon after opening.

In the late 1920s, Stanley Rose became a partner, although the partnership dissolved when Rose took the rap for his partners and pled guilty to violating a copyright by publishing a pirated edition of Charles "Chic" Sale's The Specialist. After a short jail sentence, Rose opened his own bookstore elsewhere in Hollywood.

Milton and Hazel eventually sold their Hollywood bookshop to Edward Gilbert, who renamed it Gilbert Books and relocated it to 6264 Hollywood Boulevard.

== Locations ==
- Hollywood Brown Derby
- U.S. Historic district – Contributing property
- The building in 1928
- Location: 1628 N. Vine St., Hollywood, California
- Built: 1928
- Architect: Carl Jules Weyl
- Architectural style: Spanish Colonial Revival
- Demolished: 1994
- Part of: Hollywood Boulevard Commercial and Entertainment District (ID85000704)
- Designated CP: April 4, 1985

Originally located on Hudson Street, Satyr Book Shop moved next to the Hollywood Brown Derby at 1628 Vine Street, Hollywood, California, soon after opening. The two businesses shared the same building, a building known for its Spanish Colonial Revival design, which included Churrigueresque detailing, arched entrances, wrought iron decorations, a red tile roof, and an overall "extraordinary attention to detail." It was built by Carl Jules Weyl in 1928.

- Gilberts Books
- U.S. Historic district – Contributing property
- Location: 6264 W. Hollywood Blvd., Hollywood, California
- Built: 1932
- Architect: H. Knauer
- Architectural style: Chateauesque
- Demolished: as of 2020
- Part of: Hollywood Boulevard Commercial and Entertainment District (ID85000704)
- Designated CP: April 4, 1985

After Edward Gilbert purchased the bookshop, he moved it to a Chateauesque commercial structure at 6264 Hollywood Boulevard, one that "exemplified one of the more colorful architectural styles popular in the 1930s." This building, designed by H.J. Knauer and built in 1932, featured a steep pitched roof and asymmetrical massing with a wide bay on the west and a pyramidal tower on the east, the sides of which were decorated with quoins. The building also featured narrow pedimented dormers that rose to a broken swan's neck pediment with an urn.

In 1985, the Hollywood Boulevard Commercial and Entertainment District was added to the National Register of Historic Places, with both the Satyr Book Shop building and Gilberts Books building listed as contributing properties in the district. The Satyr Book Shop building was demolished in 1994 and Gilbert Books was demolished as of 2020.

Satyr Book Shop also had a second location at 3929 Wilshire Boulevard.

== See also ==
- Larry Edmunds Bookshop
- Pickwick Book Shop
- Stanley Rose Book Shop
