= Pickwick Book Shop =

Former independent Bookstore in Los Angeles, California

- Industry: Specialty retail
- Founded: 1938
- Founder: Louis Epstein
- Defunct: 1979
- Fate: bought by Dayton Hudson
- Successor: B. Dalton
- Headquarters: Los Angeles, United States
- Number of locations: 16 at its peak
- Area served: Southern California
- Key people: Louis Epstein, Dayton Hudson

Pickwick Book Shop was an independent bookstore located at 6741-6745 W. Hollywood Boulevard in Hollywood, California. The store was popular with many film and literary figures, and was known as the "supermarket of books."

== History ==
Louis Epstein purchased his first bookstore, a tiny bookshop attached to a gunsmith shop in Long Beach, California, in 1925. He soon moved his business to downtown Los Angeles, renaming it Epstein's Used Books. The store focused on literature and poetry.

In the early 1930s, a movie studio inquired with Epstein about renting 5000 books to be used as props, to which they agreed to a price of $0.05 ($1.06 in 2025) per book per day for thirty days. The books were returned about a year later, and when the studio attempted to pay for only the original thirty days, Epstein phoned his lawyer who extracted the full amount. Epstein's lawyer then refused to give Epstein the money, fearing Epstein would "spend it foolishly buying more books and having a good time." Instead, he told Epstein to find a building to buy and he would release the money into escrow for it. In 1938, Epstein used this account to open Pickwick Book Shop, which he named after the 1836 Charles Dickens' book The Pickwick Papers.

Pickwick Book Shop was a three-story bookshop located at 6743 W. Hollywood Boulevard in Hollywood, California, and was immensely popular with film and literary insiders, as well as the general public. During its heyday, notable figures such as F Scott Fitzgerald, Raymond Chandler, William Faulkner, Humphrey Bogart, and Marlene Dietrich frequented the shop, and Orson Welles, Peter Finch, Marlon Brando, and Ray Bradbury were known to visit as well.

Pickwick Book Shop eventually expanded into the building west of it, and fifteen additional locations also opened around southern California.

In 1968, Dayton Hudson retail corporation, founder of B. Dalton bookstores, bought the Pickwick chain, and in 1979 consolidated all Pickwick stores under the B. Dalton name.

== Building ==
- Pickwick Books
- U.S. Historic district – Contributing property
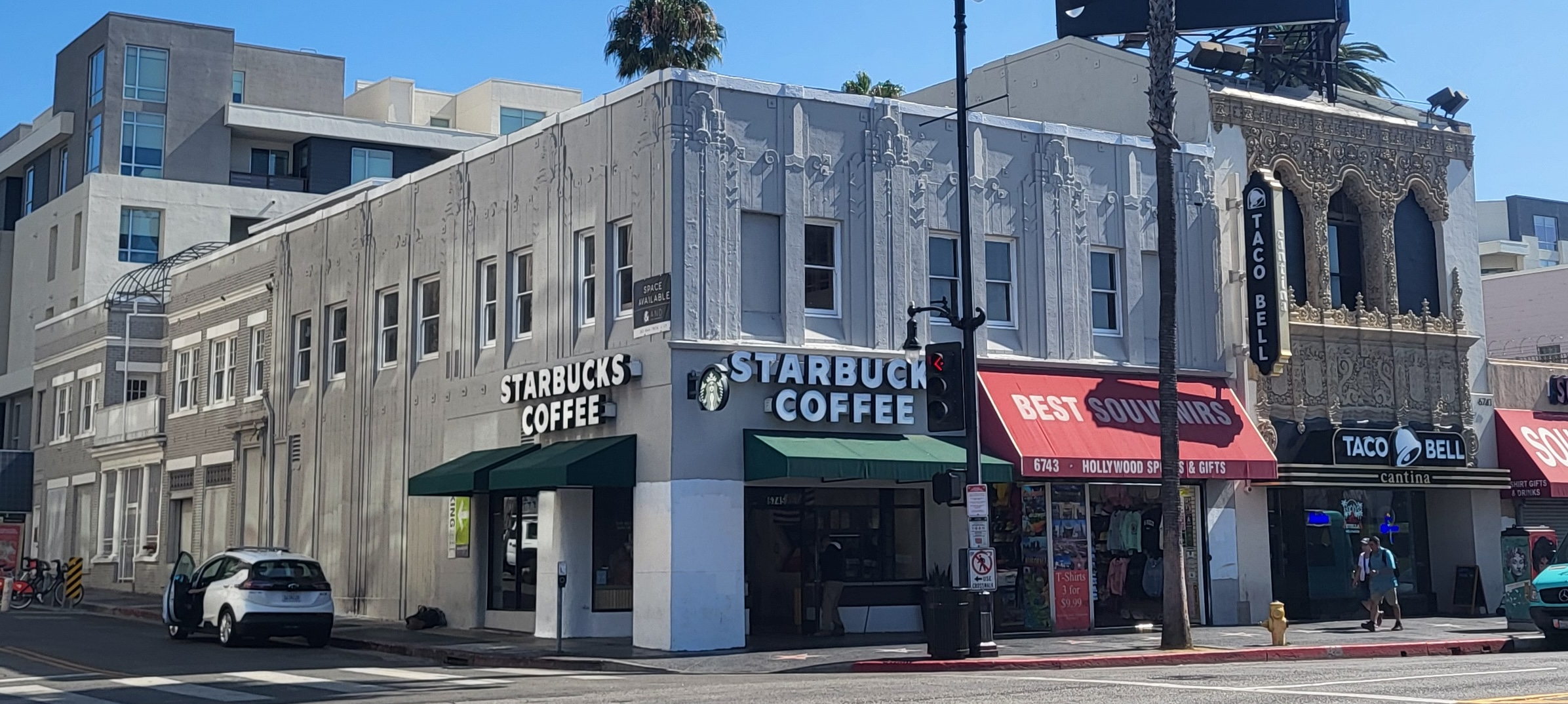
- The building in 2024
- Location: 1708 N McCadden Place and 6741-6745 Hollywood Boulevard, Hollywood, California
- Built: 1917, 1925, 1936
- Architect: Morgan, Walls & Clements (1925)
- Architectural style: Vernacular/Spanish Colonial Revival/Art Deco
- Part of: Hollywood Boulevard Commercial and Entertainment District (ID85000704)
- Designated CP: April 4, 1985

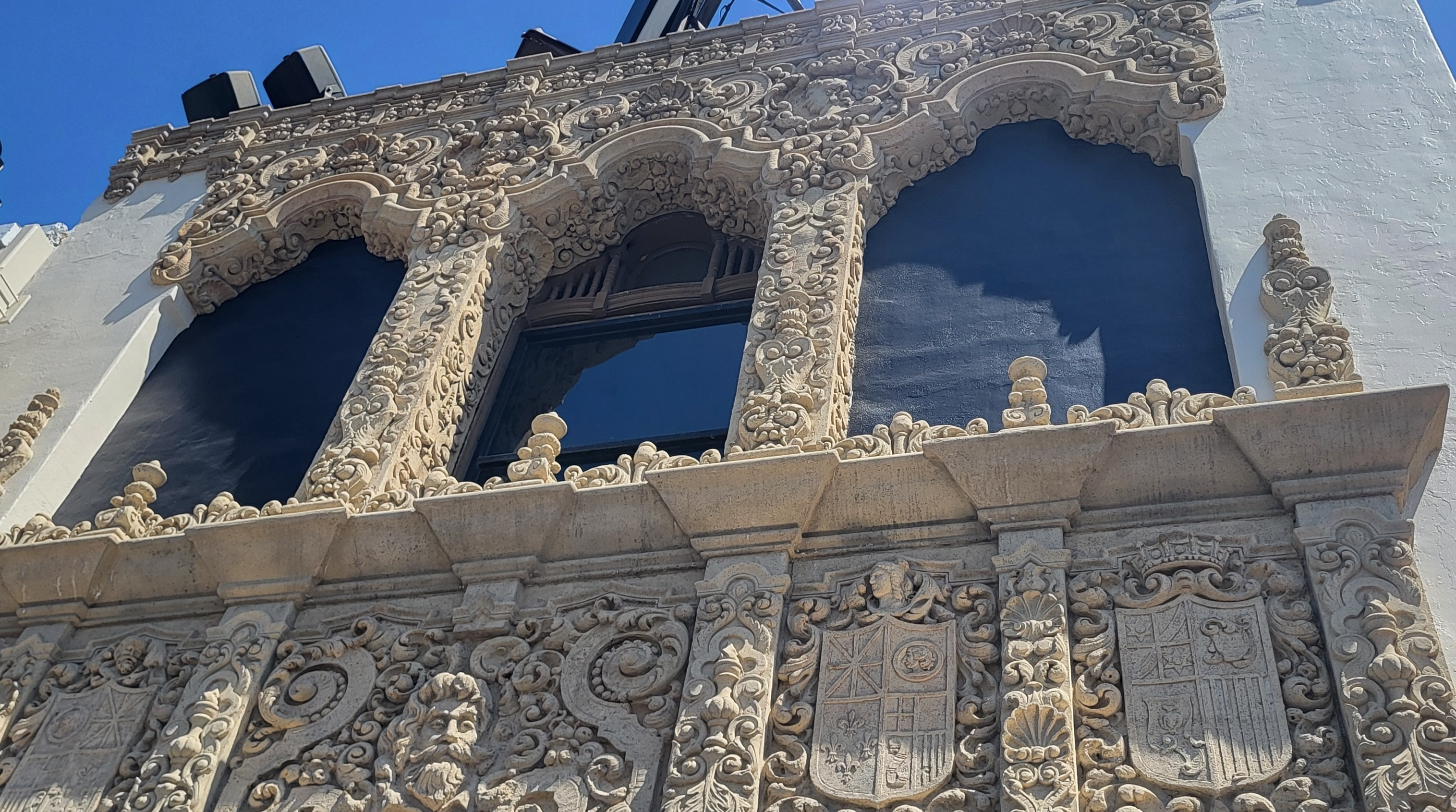
Churrigueresque detailing

At its greatest expanse, Pickwick Book Shop occupied two neighboring buildings in Hollywood, at 1708 N McCadden Place and 6741-6745 Hollywood Boulevard. The buildings, built in 1917, 1925, and 1936, feature three distinct architecture styles, each one associated with Hollywood in its heyday. The McCadden facade features commercial brick vernacular, the McCadden Pl./Hollywood Blvd. corner features an Art Deco facade with stylized concrete designs, and the Hollywood facade features Churrigueresque detailing. Morgan, Walls & Clements designed the portion of the building built in 1925.

In 1985, the Hollywood Boulevard Commercial and Entertainment District was added to the National Register of Historic Places, with the two buildings and three architectural styles detailed above, collectively named "Pickwick Books", listed as a contributing property in the district.

The building was home to a Starbucks, souvenir shop, and Taco Bell Cantina as of 2024.

== See also ==
- Larry Edmunds Bookshop
- Satyr Book Shop
- Stanley Rose Book Shop
