= Blessed Event =

1932 film

- Directed by: Roy Del Ruth
- Written by: Howard J. Green
- Based on: Blessed Event; 1932 play by Manuel Seff and Forrest Wilson
- Starring: Lee Tracy; Mary Brian
- Cinematography: Sol Polito
- Edited by: James Gibbon
- Music by: Frank Marsales
- Distributed by: Warner Bros. Pictures, Inc.
- Release date: September 10, 1932
- Running time: 80 minutes
- Country: United States
- Language: English

Blessed Event is a 1932 American pre-Code comedy-drama film directed by Roy Del Ruth and starring Lee Tracy as a newspaper gossip columnist who becomes entangled with a gangster. The Tracy character (Alvin Roberts) was reportedly patterned after Walter Winchell, famous gossip columnist of the era. The film marked Dick Powell's film debut.

== Plot ==
Alvin Roberts feuds with singer Bunny Harmon. Roberts reports on society people who are expecting a "blessed event", i.e. going to have a child. One such report antagonizes a gangster in a delicate situation, who sends over a henchman to threaten him. Roberts manages to turn the tables on the gangster.

The character of Bunny Harmon is a parody of Rudy Vallee, as both of them sing and play saxophone, and Vallee's band was called the Connecticut Yankees, while Harmon's is the Green Mountain Boys, a reference to another New England state, Vermont. The feud between Roberts and Harmon is a parody of the real-life (contrived) feud between Walter Winchell and bandleader Ben Bernie.

== Cast ==
- Lee Tracy as Alvin Roberts
- Mary Brian as Gladys Price
- Dick Powell as Bunny Harmon
- Allen Jenkins as Frankie Wells
- Ruth Donnelly as Miss Stevens
- Emma Dunn as Mrs. Roberts
- Edwin Maxwell as Sam Goebel
- Ned Sparks as George Moxley
- Walter Walker as Mr. Miller
- Frank McHugh as Reilly
- Herman Bing as Emil
- George Chandler as Hanson (uncredited)
- Isabel Jewell as Dorothy Lane (uncredited)
