= The Best Man (1964 film) =

1964 U.S. political drama film

- Theatrical poster
- Directed by: Franklin J. Schaffner
- Screenplay by: Gore Vidal
- Based on: The Best Man; 1960 play by Gore Vidal
- Produced by: Stuart Millar; Lawrence Turman
- Starring: Henry Fonda; Cliff Robertson; Edie Adams; Margaret Leighton; Shelley Berman; Lee Tracy; Ann Sothern
- Cinematography: Haskell Wexler A.S.C.
- Edited by: Robert Swink
- Music by: Mort Lindsey
- Distributed by: United Artists
- Release date: April 5, 1964 (US)
- Running time: 102 minutes
- Country: United States
- Language: English

The Best Man is a 1964 American political drama film directed by Franklin J. Schaffner with a screenplay by Gore Vidal based on his 1960 play of the same title. Starring Henry Fonda, Cliff Robertson and Lee Tracy, the film details the seamy political maneuverings behind the nomination of a presidential candidate at their party's national convention. The supporting cast features Edie Adams, Margaret Leighton, Ann Sothern, Shelley Berman, Gene Raymond and Kevin McCarthy. Lee Tracy was nominated for an Academy Award for Best Supporting Actor for his performance and it was his final theatrically released film.

== Plot ==
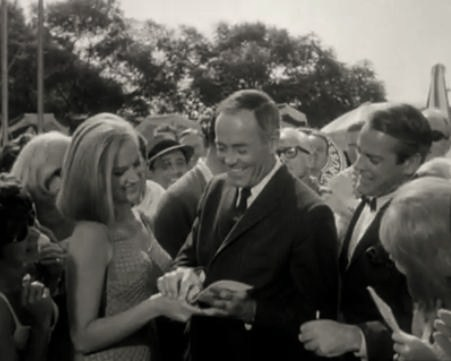
Henry Fonda (center) and Kevin McCarthy in The Best Man

In May 1964, former Secretary of State William Russell and Senator Joe Cantwell are the two leading candidates for the presidential nomination of their unnamed political party. Both have potentially fatal vulnerabilities. Russell is a principled intellectual, but his sexual indiscretions and lack of attention to his wife Alice have alienated her. He has a past nervous breakdown to live down. Cantwell portrays himself as a populist "man of the people" and patriotic anti-communist campaigning to end "the missile gap". He is a ruthless opportunist, willing to go to any lengths to get the nomination. Neither man can stand the other; neither believes his rival qualified to be president. At the nominating convention in Los Angeles, they lobby for the crucial support of dying former President Art Hockstader. The pragmatic Hockstader prefers Russell, but worries about his indecision and principles; he despises Cantwell for his recklessness but appreciates his toughness and willingness to do whatever it takes.

Hockstader decides to support Cantwell until the candidate blunders badly. When the two speak privately, Cantwell attacks Russell using illegally obtained psychological reports obtained by Don Cantwell, his brother and campaign manager. Cantwell mistakenly assumed that Hockstader was going to endorse Russell. The former President tells Cantwell that he does not mind a "bastard" but objects to a stupid one. He endorses neither man. The candidates try to sway undecided delegates, Russell appealing to their principles and Cantwell using blackmail. Russell finds out to his chagrin that Hockstader has offered the vice-presidential spot on his ticket to all three of the minor candidates, Senator Oscar Anderson, Governor John Merwin and Governor T. T. Claypoole. One of Russell's aides finds Sheldon Bascomb, who served in the military with Cantwell and is willing to link him to homosexual activity he engaged in while stationed in Alaska during World War II. Hockstader and Russell's closest advisors press Russell to seize the opportunity but he refuses to do so.

After the first ballot, Russell arranges to meet Cantwell privately but when Bascomb is confronted face-to-face by Cantwell, Cantwell angrily counters the charges. Russell threatens to use the allegation anyway but Cantwell knows Russell does not have the stomach for such smear tactics. As the rounds of balloting continue, neither man has enough votes to win though Cantwell holds a narrow lead. Cantwell offers Russell the second spot on his ticket but Russell shocks him by instead releasing his delegates and recommending they throw their support behind Merwin, who secures the nomination.

== Cast ==
- Henry Fonda as William Russell, a former secretary of state whom Vidal based on Adlai Stevenson
- Cliff Robertson as Joe Cantwell, a sitting U.S. senator based on Richard Nixon and Joe McCarthy
- Edie Adams as Mabel Cantwell
- Margaret Leighton as Alice Russell
- Shelley Berman as Sheldon Bascomb, a former Army comrade of Cantwell
- Lee Tracy as Art Hockstader, the former president of the United States, based on Harry S. Truman
- Ann Sothern as Sue Ellen Gamadge, the party's vice chair
- Gene Raymond as Don Cantwell, Joe's brother and campaign manager
- Kevin McCarthy as Dick Jensen, Russell's campaign manager

- Mahalia Jackson as herself
- Howard K. Smith as himself
- John Henry Faulk as Governor T. T. Claypoole, another candidate
- Richard Arlen as Senator Oscar Anderson, a candidate
- Penny Singleton [credited but does not appear]
- George Kirgo as Speechwriter
- George Furth as Tom
- Anne Newman as Janet
- Mary Lawrence as Mrs. Merwin
- H. E. West as Senator Lazarus
- Michael MacDonald as Zealot
- William R. Ebersol as Governor John Merwin, a candidate
- Natalie Masters as Mrs. Anderson
- Blossom Rock as Cleaning woman
- Bill Stout as himself
- Tyler McVey as Chairman
- Sherwood Keith as Doctor

Uncredited (in order of appearance)

- Shep Houghton as Reporter
- Fred Aldrich as Delegate
- Gene Roth as Delegate from Pennsylvania
- William Henry as Reporter
- Rupert Crosse as Reporter
- Byron Morrow as Banquet Master of Ceremonies
- Colin Kenny as man at pool
- John Indrisano as Mobster
- Billy Beck as Guest at party
- Gore Vidal as Senator at convention

Character names are not indicated in the screen credits. The closing credits feature film clips depicting the faces and names of cast members Henry Fonda, Cliff Robertson, Edie Adams, Margaret Leighton, Shelley Berman, Lee Tracy, Ann Sothern, Gene Raymond, Kevin McCarthy and John Henry Faulk.

Tracy received an Academy Award for Best Supporting Actor nomination for repeating the role of Hockstader that he had originated on stage. Faulk was a Texas-based radio personality who was blacklisted during the 1950s and won a lawsuit that helped restore his reputation. Kevin McCarthy was a cousin of Eugene McCarthy, who became a presidential contender in 1968.

== Production ==
The Best Man was hotel executive William R. Ebersol's only film and he does not speak. It was the first American film to feature the word homosexual.

== Reception ==
Bosley Crowther's review of the film in The New York Times cited William R. Ebersol in the role of Governor John Merwin as one of those who "stand out in a cast that is notable for its authenticity". The film holds a 100% "Fresh" rating on Rotten Tomatoes based on 6 reviews, with an average critical rating of 9.0/10. Ben Cosgrove of Time said, "Considering how ruthless the film is in dissecting the amoral machinations employed in virtually any national political endeavor, The Best Man is remarkable not for its scorn or its misanthropy, but for the even-handedness of its vision." Critic John Simon described The Best Man as "impure hokum".
