= Larry Edmunds Bookshop =

Independent Bookstore in Los Angeles, California

- Industry: Specialty retail
- Founded: 1938
- Founder: Larry Edmunds
- Number of locations: 1 store
- Area served: Los Angeles metropolitan area
- Key people: Larry Edmunds, Milton Luboviski, Git Luboviski, Jeffrey Mantor
- Products: Motion picture and theater related books, magazines, posters, scripts, stills, photographs
- Owner: Jeffrey Mantor
- Website: larryedmunds.com

Larry Edmunds Bookshop is an independent bookstore located at 6644 W. Hollywood Boulevard in Hollywood, California that specializes in film, television, and theater. Containing more than 20,000 books, 6,000 original posters, and 500,000 photographs, it is the last of many bookstores that once lined Hollywood Boulevard and was declared by film critic and historian Leonard Maltin to be "the best movie bookstore in the world."

== History ==
Larry Edmunds Bookshop opened in 1938, after founder Larry Edmunds bought an existing bookshop on Cahuenga Boulevard. In the beginning, the store focused on literature and obscure works requested by Hollywood executives, screenwriters, and directors, with patrons that included William Faulkner and Henry Miller, the latter of whom the bookstore paid $1 per page to write the softcore novella Opus Pistorium, which sold three copies.

In the 1950s, the store expanded to entertainment-related books, which would eventually become its focus, and in the 1960s the store expanded again, this time adding scripts, magazines, posters, film stills, and other movie-related material. In 1952, the store released its first catalog, written by co-owner Git Luboviski and by the mid-1960s, the catalog had grown to more than 200 pages. By this point, the bookshop was considered "the go-to source for anything related to motion pictures."

In 1955, the store moved into the Cherokee Building at 6658 W. Hollywood Boulevard, and in 1990 it moved to its current location, 6644 W. Hollywood Boulevard. Celebrities and other members of the industry were common at these locations, including Ursula Andress, Debbie Reynolds, Anthony Perkins, Michael Powell, King Vidor, David Lean, Orson Welles, Jim Jarmusch, Peter Bogdanovich, Spike Lee, Michael Jackson, Ru Paul, John Cleese, Shirley Jones, Chelsea Handler, Quentin Tarantino, J.J. Abrams, John Landis, Joe Dante, and more. Ray Bradbury and John Waters also frequented the bookshop, and their Hollywood Walk of Fame stars are located out front.

In 2020, the store opened a GoFundMe to help weather the effects of the COVID-19 lockdowns. The campaign raised more than $50,000, about half its goal.

== In popular culture ==
Larry Edmunds Bookshop has been featured in many movies and television shows, including Alex in Wonderland, Fade to Black, Melrose Place, Beverly Hills 90210, The District, and Once Upon a Time in Hollywood.

== See also ==
- Pickwick Book Shop
- Satyr Book Shop
- Stanley Rose Book Shop
