= Randall Reid =

Randall C. (Randy) Reid (1931–1992) was a literary critic and fiction writer who served as a director and dean of Deep Springs College, and taught at The University of Chicago, University of Nevada, Reno, and San Diego State College. He is the author of The Fiction of Nathanael West: No Redeemer, No Promised Land (first ed. 1967), the novel Lost and Found, and several short stories, including Detritus, selected for the O'Henry Prize Stories 1973. He was born in Paso Robles, California, attended Deep Springs College and San Francisco State University, and received his M.A. and Ph.D. from Stanford University.
