= The Dream Life of Balso Snell =

1931 novel by Nathanael West

- 1931 first edition cover
- Author: Nathanael West
- Language: English
- Genre: Novel
- Publisher: Contact Editions
- Publication date: 1931
- Publication place: United States
- Media type: Print (Paperback)
- Pages: 95 pp

The Dream Life of Balso Snell is a 1931 novel by American author Nathanael West. West's first novel, it presents a young man's immature and cynical search for meaning in a series of dreamlike encounters inside the entrails of the Trojan Horse.

== Plot summary ==
Balso, the protagonist, comes across the Trojan Horse in the tall grass around Troy and promptly seeks a way to get in: “the mouth was beyond his reach, the navel provided a cul-de-sac, and so, forgetting his dignity, he approached the last. O Anus Mirabilis!” The literary critic Leslie Fiedler reads much into this and sees the whole novel as "a fractured and dissolving parable of the very process by which the emancipated Jew enters into the world of Western Culture." Inside the Trojan Horse, Balso encounters an array of odd characters who, he realizes, are all "writers in search of an audience". These characters also represent various religious and artistic ideals. Balso hears their stories systematically, only to discard them one by one, in a strictly nihilist fashion.

== Literary significance and criticism ==
The novel's lack of a coherent plot structure, along with its juvenile humor and abundant scatological details, are all intended to aggravate, perplex and annoy readers. The desired result, according to West, is a book that is “a protest against writing books”. The juvenility and incoherence of the novel have prompted critics to disregard it as “a sneer in the bathroom mirror at Art” (Alan Ross), “squalid and dreadful” (Harold Bloom) and “a hysterical, obscure, disgusted shriek against the intellect” (James F. Light). Nonetheless, by its complete and disgusted rejection of all religious, political and artistic ideals The Dream Life of Balso Snell foreshadows the nihilism of West’s subsequent novels.

== Publication history ==
West began developing material for The Dream Life of Balso Snell as early as 1924; he worked on the novel during his stay in Paris in 1926 and finished a complete draft in New York City between 1927 and 1929, under the title The Journal of Balso Snell. The manuscript was rejected twice before finally getting accepted, largely due to a favorable appraisal by William Carlos Williams. The book was published in New York City by the Paris-based Contact Editions in August 1931 in an edition of 500 copies. There were no other printings during West’s lifetime. After West became famous (years after his death) for Miss Lonelyhearts and The Day of the Locust, Balso Snell was reprinted in a single volume edition of his complete novels, as well as in the Library of America edition of West's collected works.
