= The Day of the Locust (film) =

1975 film by John Schlesinger

- Theatrical release poster by David Edward Byrd
- Directed by: John Schlesinger
- Screenplay by: Waldo Salt
- Based on: The Day of the Locust by Nathanael West
- Produced by: Jerome Hellman
- Starring: Donald Sutherland; Karen Black; William Atherton; Burgess Meredith; Geraldine Page
- Cinematography: Conrad L. Hall
- Edited by: Jim Clark
- Music by: John Barry
- Production company: Long Road Productions
- Distributed by: Paramount Pictures
- Release date: May 7, 1975
- Running time: 144 minutes
- Country: United States
- Language: English
- Budget: $4 million

The Day of the Locust is a 1975 American psychological historical drama film directed by John Schlesinger, and starring Donald Sutherland, Karen Black, William Atherton, Burgess Meredith, and Geraldine Page. Adapted for the screen by Waldo Salt from the 1939 novel of the same title by Nathanael West, the film conveys the alienation and desperation of a disparate group of people in 1938 Hollywood whose dreams of success do not come true. Richard Dysart, John Hillerman, Bo Hopkins, Lelia Goldoni, and Jackie Earle Haley appear in supporting roles.

Released in May 1975 by Paramount Pictures, The Day of the Locust was regarded as a box-office flop, though it did receive some critical accolades, including multiple Academy Award, BAFTA Award, and Golden Globe Award nominations.

Contemporarily, the film has garnered scholarly attention for its nightmarish depiction and acerbic commentary on the Hollywood film industry, (Note: Attributed to multiple sources.) and critical attention for its visually implicit horror elements.

== Plot ==
Aspiring artist and recent Yale graduate Tod Hackett arrives in 1938 Hollywood to work as an art department production illustrator at a major film studio. He rents an apartment in the San Bernardino Arms, a rundown bungalow court whose occupants include many on the fringes of the industry. Among them are Faye Greener, a tawdry aspiring actress; her father Harry, an ex-vaudevillian; Abe Kusich, a dwarf who carries on a tempestuous relationship with his girlfriend, Mary; and Adore Loomis, a young boy whose mother hopes to turn him into a child star. Faye later meets Homer Simpson, a repressed accountant from a nearby up-scale neighborhood who lusts after her. Tod fills a crack in the wall of his unit with a red flower. Tod befriends Faye, and attends a screening of a film in which she has a bit part, accompanied by Earle Shoop, a cowboy she is dating. Faye is disappointed her appearance has been severely truncated. Faye declines Tod's attempts at romance, telling him she'll only marry a rich man.

Tod attends a party at the Hollywood Hills mansion where partygoers watch stag films. Despite her hesitations, Faye continues to spend time with Tod. At a campfire in a canyon in the hills, a drunken Tod becomes enraged when Faye dances with Earle's friend Miguel. He assaults her but she fends him off. When Faye and Homer take Harry to a Pentecostal church gathering, a female preacher known as Big Sister performs a public "healing" to cure his heart ailment, but he subsequently dies. To pay for Harry's funeral costs, Faye begins prostituting herself.

The shy, obsessive Homer cares for Faye after her father's death and the two move in together. Faye can only find work as an extra. While filming a Waterloo-themed period drama, Faye survives a collapse of the set, witnessed by Tod. Faye and Homer attend a dinner theater with Tod which features a drag show as entertainment. Faye confesses to Tod her relationship with Homer is sexless, but loving and secure. Faye and Homer host a party attended by Tod, Abe, Earle, Miguel, and Claude Estee, a successful art director. Faye attempts to impress Claude and the other men and Homer watches them drunkenly fawning over her. Faye accuses Homer of being a peeping tom. Homer later walks in on Faye having sex with Miguel. Tod ignores the ensuring commotion, but Earle begins fighting with Miguel.

Faye attends the gala premiere of The Buccaneer at Grauman's Chinese Theatre. Tod, stuck in traffic, sees Homer and tries to talk to him. Homer ignores him and sits on a bench near the theater. Adore, attending the premiere with his mother, taunts Homer and sings "Jeepers Creepers", a song Faye would often sing. An enraged Homer chases Adore through the crowd, and stomps him to death in a parking lot. Adore's dying screams draw a crowd that catches Homer, and beats him viciously as a full-blown riot erupts. An announcer at the premiere mistakes the riot as enthusiasm for the film. Faye is assaulted in the melee, Tod suffers a compound fracture to his leg, and a car is flipped over, igniting a fire that quickly spreads. Tod witnesses the apparitions of numerous faceless, Goyaesque figures from his paintings descending on the scene.

Later, Faye enters Tod's abandoned apartment and sees everything is gone except for the flower in the wall crack. Her eyes well with tears.

== Cast ==
- William Atherton as Tod Hacket
- Karen Black as Faye Greener
- Donald Sutherland as Homer Simpson
- Burgess Meredith as Harry Greener
- Geraldine Page as Big Sister
- Richard Dysart as Claude Estee
- Bo Hopkins as Earle Shoop
- Pepe Serna as Miguel
- Lelia Goldoni as Mary Dove
- Billy Barty as Abe Kusich
- Jackie Haley as Adore Loomis
- Gloria LeRoy as Mrs. Loomis
- Jane Hoffman as Mrs. Odlesh
- Norman Leavitt as Mr. Odlesh
- Madge Kennedy as Mrs. Johnson
- Natalie Schafer as Audrey Jennings
- Gloria Stroock as Alice Estee
- Nita Talbot as Joan
- Paul Stewart as Helverston
- John Hillerman as Ned Grote
- William Castle as the Director
- Robert Pine as Apprentice
- Jerry Fogel as Apprentice
- Dennis Dugan as Apprentice
- David Ladd as Apprentice
- Paul Jabara as the Nightclub Entertainer
- Morgan Brittany as Vivien Leigh (uncredited)

== Themes ==
Critics and film scholars have generally interpreted The Day of the Locust as a commentary on desperation and greed in the Hollywood film industry. Film scholar M. Keith Booker views The Day of the Locust as "one of the nastiest film critiques ever produced of the film industry itself," that depicts Hollywood as a "nightmare realm dominated by images of commodified sex and violence." Booker notes that the film aims to depict Hollywood and greater Los Angeles as a "dumping ground upon which broken dreams can be discarded to make way for the ever newer dreams constantly being turned out by the American Culture Industry."

Lee Gambin of ComingSoon.net considers The Day of the Locust a "non-horror film that is secretly a horror film... a genuinely terrifying venture into the dark recesses of not only an industry that eats its product, vomits it back up and scoffs it down again, but a wonderful critique on human ugliness and desolation."

== Production ==
=== Development ===
John Schlesinger was announced as the director of the film in August 1973, and had wanted to make a feature film adaptation of the Nathanael West novel of the same name for "many years." Schlesinger first read the novel in 1967, and "fell in love" with the characters as he found their plight "completely comprehensible and immensely moving." Waldo Salt, who had written the screenplay for Schlesinger's previous film, Midnight Cowboy (1969), adapted West's novel for the screen. Producer Walter Shedlo optioned the novel to Warner Bros. in 1973, but the studio declined to produce the film due to Schlesinger's proposed budget of $4 million. Shedlo subsequently withdrew from the project, after which Jerome Hellman signed on as producer and secured a deal with Paramount Pictures, who agreed to fund the project.

Some film industry commentators and journalists worried that Schlesinger's adaptation may depict a "raunchy underbelly" of Hollywood, similar to Midnight Cowboy, which depicted seedier factions of New York City subculture. Schlesinger commented that his film version of West's novel would be "cynical, perhaps. But also funny and very human."

=== Casting ===
William Atherton and Karen Black on the set of the film

Donald Sutherland and Karen Black's casting in the film's lead roles was announced in the fall of 1973. According to Schlesinger, the casting of Black was an "immense problem" as the character in the source novel is seventeen years old; Black was thirty four-years-old at the time of filming. "There were a lot of raised eyebrows when we cast Karen," Schlesinger said. "But Faye [in our film] doesn't work as a teen-ager. She has to be funky and sexy. We saw her as quite a funny girl, too, and a younger actress couldn't have done it."

Geraldine Page, who appears as a charismatic evangelist in the film, was based on and fashioned like Pentecostal evangelist Aimee Semple McPherson.

=== Filming ===
Following two weeks of cast rehearsals, principal photography of The Day of the Locust began at Paramount Hollywood Studios and on location throughout Los Angeles on October 15, 1973, on a budget of $4 million. Approximately eighty percent of the film was shot on Paramount's studio lots, with the remaining twenty percent occurring on location. Film historian Gene D. Phillips characterized the film as "one of the most stunningly stylized motion pictures ever produced by a major studio," noting Schlesinger's meticulous attention to period detail and visual symbolism.

The apartment building featured in the film also used as a set for The Fortune. A funeral scene in the film was shot on location at Inglewood Park Cemetery in Inglewood, California, while the evangelist church gathering sequence was filmed in the ballroom of the Hollywood Palladium.

Due to logistical issues, the film's finale—set at the Grauman's Chinese Theatre—was unable to be shot on location. Instead, the theatre's facade and approximately three blocks of period-accurate Hollywood Boulevard were meticulously recreated on the Paramount Studios lot.

== Release ==
The film was shown at the 1975 Cannes Film Festival, but was not entered into the main competition. Paramount Pictures released it theatrically in the United States on May 7, 1975, premiering it in New York City.

=== Home media ===
The Day of the Locust was released on VHS and LaserDisc by Paramount Home Entertainment in 1983, and again on VHS 1990. Paramount issued a DVD edition on June 8, 2004. The Australian label Imprint Films released a limited edition Blu-ray on October 28, 2020. A newly-restored Blu-ray edition was released in North America and the United Kingdom by Arrow Video on December 5, 2023.

== Reception ==
=== Box office ===
Released in the spring of 1975, The Day of the Locust was considered a box-office flop upon its release.

=== Critical response ===
Newspaper advertisement in The Philadelphia Inquirer, August 22, 1975

Critical reaction to The Day of the Locust was characterized by divisive, "extreme reviews" that defined the film's public reception. Schlesinger conceded that the film disappointed audiences because "there was no one in the film that they could root for." In his review in The New York Times, Vincent Canby called it "less a conventional film than it is a gargantuan panorama, a spectacle that illustrates West's dispassionate prose with a fidelity to detail more often found in a gimcracky Biblical epic than in something that so relentlessly ridicules American civilization... The movie is far from subtle, but it doesn't matter. It seems that much more material was shot than could be easily fitted into the movie, even at 144 minutes... It is reality projected as fantasy. Its grossness — its bigger-than-life quality — is so much a part of its style (and what West was writing about) that one respects the extravagances, the almost lunatic scale on which Mr. Schlesinger has filmed its key sequences." Roger Ebert of the Chicago Sun-Times called it a "daring, epic film... a brilliant one at times, and with a wealth of sharp-edged performances," citing that of Donald Sutherland as "one of the movie's wonders," although he expressed some reservations, noting that "somewhere on the way to its final vast metaphors, The Day of the Locust misplaces its concern with its characters. We begin to sense that they're marching around in response to the requirements of the story, instead of leading lives of their own. And so we stop worrying about them, because they're doomed anyway and not always because of their own shortcoming." Rex Reed of the New York Daily News heralded it as an "authentic masterpiece," summarizing: "The majesty and greatness of this magnificent film lie not only in its moral, but in every aspect of Schlesinger's over the art of film itself."

Pauline Kael criticized the film for "having no emotional center" and leaving "little impression—only a chill," adding: "All the way through, the biggest crowd sequences are the least effective; Schlesinger’s direction generally seems to grow worse in direct ratio to the number of people on the screen." Jay Cocks of Time felt that Salt's adaptation of the novel was weak, writing: "The Day of the Locust looks puffy and overdrawn, sounds shrill because it is made with a combination of self-loathing and tenuous moral superiority. This is a movie turned out by the sort of mentality that West was mocking. Salt's adaptation... misses what is most crucial: West's tone of level rage and tilted compassion, his ability to make human even the most grotesque mockery." In the Chicago Reader, Jonathan Rosenbaum similarly described the film as "a painfully misconceived reduction and simplification... of the great Nathanael West novel about Hollywood... It misses crucial aspects of the book's surrealism and satire, though it has a fair number of compensations if you don't care about what's being ground underfoot — among them, Conrad Hall's cinematography and... one of Donald Sutherland's better performances."

=== Modern assessment ===
On the review aggregator website Rotten Tomatoes, 63% of 35 critics' reviews are positive. The consensus summarizes: "Although its source material's themes are sometimes beyond The Day of the Locust's grasp, this is a consistently watchable adaptation that gains its own emotional power."

Film critic and journalist Glenn Erickson heralded The Day of the Locust as "one of the best 'Hollywood on Hollywood' pictures ever, even if it soaks everything about The Golden Age of Tinseltown in an acid bath of cynicism. The perverse dystopia of dreams and vice is beautifully rendered in every respect." Greg Ferrara for Turner Classic Movies, wrote "...every bit as powerful as any movie on the movie industry out there and, in my opinion, conveys the themes and metaphors of the book in exactly the right tone. They didn’t get it wrong at all, they got it perfectly right by telling the story, cinematically, in a very different way than the book. It’s harsh, brutal, cruel and unrelenting. I’ve rarely beheld a more pessimistic movie but it’s [sic] point, about all this fraud and hopelessness around us is both well-presented and well-taken."

Channel 4 deemed it "fascinating, if flawed" and "by turns gaudy, bitter and occasionally just plain weird," adding "great performances and magnificent design make this a spectacular and highly entertaining film."

=== Accolades ===
| Award/association | Year | Category | Recipient(s) and nominee(s) | Result | Ref. |
|---|---|---|---|---|---|
| Academy Awards | 1976 | Best Supporting Actor | Burgess Meredith | Nominated | |
| Academy Awards | 1976 | Best Cinematography | Conrad Hall | Nominated | |
| British Academy Film Awards | 1976 | Best Actor in a Supporting Role | Burgess Meredith | Nominated | |
| British Academy Film Awards | 1976 | Best Art Direction | Richard Macdonald | Nominated | |
| British Academy Film Awards | 1976 | Best Costume Design | Ann Roth | Won | |
| Golden Globe Awards | 1976 | Best Actress in a Motion Picture – Drama | Karen Black | Nominated | |
| Golden Globe Awards | 1976 | Best Supporting Actor – Motion Picture | Burgess Meredith | Nominated | |
| National Board of Review | 1975 | Top Ten Films | | 6th Place | |

== See also ==
- List of American films of 1975

== Sources ==
- Booker, M. Keith (2007). From Box Office to Ballot Box: The American Political Film. Westport, Connecticut: Greenwood Publishing Group. ISBN 978-0-275-99122-7.
- Brown, Julia Prewitt (2019). The Films of John Schlesinger. London, England: Anthem Press. ISBN 978-1-783-08979-6.
- Phillips, Gene D. (1981). John Schlesinger. Boston, Massachusetts: Twayne Publishers. ISBN 978-0-805-79280-5.
