= James F. Light =

American literary scholar

James F. Light

James F. Light (1921 – 2002) was an American literary scholar, professor, and academic administrator. During his academic career, he helped revive the works of satirist Nathanael West, with the first book length critical study of West's work, Nathanael West: An Interpretive Study (1961). He was also the leading authority on John William De Forest, the early American realist whose work he critiqued in John William De Forest (1965), and he wrote extensively on J. D. Salinger, Robert Penn Warren and others. His essay, "The Religion of Death in A Farewell to Arms" was collected by Hemingway scholar Carlos Baker in Baker's Ernest Hemingway: A Critique of Four Major Novels.

== Early life and career ==
Light was born in Memphis, Tennessee, on November 5, 1921, to Lois Billings and Luther Light. Soon after moving to Chicago during the Depression, his parents divorced. Although his mother later remarried, he remained an only child. He was a good student admitted on scholarship to the University of Chicago, where he completed a master's degree in 1946.

In Chicago, Light was part of the literary circle around Nelson Algren and Jack Conroy, and published an influential story, Christmas Furlough, about a black WWII soldier's inability to get a bus seat home during his brief furlough. In 1948 he married the former Rowena Neal while a professor at the University of Kentucky in Lexington. After receiving a Ph.D. from Syracuse University in 1951, he taught at Radford College, then at Indiana State University for several years, culminating in a Fulbright Scholarship to Keele University in Britain in 1963–1964.

In 1965, Light moved to Connecticut with his second wife, formerly Amy Wolf (after Rowena's death), to become chairman of the English department at the University of Bridgeport. In 1972 he became dean and provost of Lehman College, part of the City University of New York, at a time when students, faculty, and college administrators were often at odds. A long-time champion of educational opportunity, Light also respected academic standards, and sought ways of balancing these goals through the college's open admissions policy. When budget cuts hit as part of New York City's fiscal crisis, his planning helped Lehman, alone among the CUNY campuses, avoid layoffs of tenured faculty.

Light completed his career as vice president of the College of Arts and Sciences at Southern Illinois University. After another Fulbright Scholarship, this time to New Zealand, he retired to Nashua, New Hampshire where he died on April 15, 2002 at the age of 80.

== Books ==
- Nathanael West: An Interpretive Study(Northwestern Univ. Press, 1961)
- John William De Forest (Twayne Pub., 1965)
