= Ticket to Paradise (1936 film) =

1936 film by Aubrey Scotto

- DVD cover for the film
- Directed by: Aubrey Scotto
- Screenplay by: Jack Natteford; Nathanael West
- Story by: David Silverstein
- Produced by: Nat Levine
- Starring: Roger Pryor; Wendy Barrie; Claude Gillingwater; Andrew Tombes; Luis Alberni; E. E. Clive
- Cinematography: Ernest Miller
- Edited by: Al Clark
- Production company: Republic Pictures
- Distributed by: Republic Pictures
- Release date: June 25, 1936
- Running time: 67 minutes
- Country: United States
- Language: English

Ticket to Paradise is a 1936 American drama film directed by Aubrey Scotto, written by Jack Natteford and Nathanael West, and starring Roger Pryor, Wendy Barrie, Claude Gillingwater, Andrew Tombes, Luis Alberni and E. E. Clive. It was released on June 25, 1936, by Republic Pictures.

== Plot ==
While hurrying to the airport to catch a plane, a man is involved in a car accident and loses his memory.

== Cast ==
- Roger Pryor as Terry Dodd aka Jack Doe
- Wendy Barrie as Jane Forbes
- Claude Gillingwater as Robert Forbes
- Andrew Tombes as Nirney
- Luis Alberni as Dr. Munson aka Monte
- E. E. Clive as Barkins
- Stanley Fields as Dan Kelly
- Theodore von Eltz as George Small
- Russell Hicks as Colton
- Herbert Rawlinson as Fred Townsend
- John Sheehan as Taxi Driver
- Earle Hodgins as Cab Starter
- Grace Hayle as Minnie Dawson
- Harry Woods as John Dawson
- Gavin Gordon as Tony Bates
- Harry Harvey Sr. as Spotter
- Duke York as Milkman
- Eric Mayne as Dr. Eckstrom
- Bud Jamison as Taxi Dispatcher
- Wallace Gregory as Intern
- Fern Emmett as Nurse
- Eleanor Huntley as Nurse
- Harrison Greene as Merry-Go-Round Man
- Shirley O'Brien as Gracie
