= The Spirit of Culver =

- Directed by: Joseph Santley
- Written by: Tom Buckingham; George Green; Clarence Marks; Whitney Bolton; Nathanael West
- Produced by: Burt Kelly
- Starring: Jackie Cooper; Freddie Bartholomew; Andy Devine
- Cinematography: Elwood Bredell
- Edited by: Frank Gross
- Music by: Frank Skinner; Charles Henderson
- Production company: Universal Pictures
- Distributed by: Universal Pictures
- Release date: March 10, 1939
- Running time: 89 minutes
- Country: United States
- Language: English

The Spirit of Culver is a 1939 drama starring Jackie Cooper and Freddie Bartholomew. Directed by Joseph Santley and written by Whitney Bolton and Nathanael West, the film is a remake of 1932's Tom Brown of Culver.

== Plot ==
Tom Allen, the son of a decorated war hero who is feared to have died in battle, wins a scholarship to the Culver Military Academy. His arrogance and unwillingness to comply with the academy's strict rules soon gets him in trouble, but through the help of his roommate he gets by.

== Cast ==
- Jackie Cooper as Tom Allen
- Freddie Bartholomew as Bob Randolph
- Andy Devine as Tubby
- Henry Hull as Doctor Allen
- Jackie Moran as Perkins
- Tim Holt as Captain Wilson
- Gene Reynolds as Carruthers
- Kathryn Kane as June Macy
- Walter Tetley as Hank
- Pierre Watkin as Captain Wharton
- John Hamilton as Major White

== Production ==
Filming took place partly at Culver Military Academy. Tim Holt had been a student there.
