= Lee Tracy =

American actor (1898–1968)

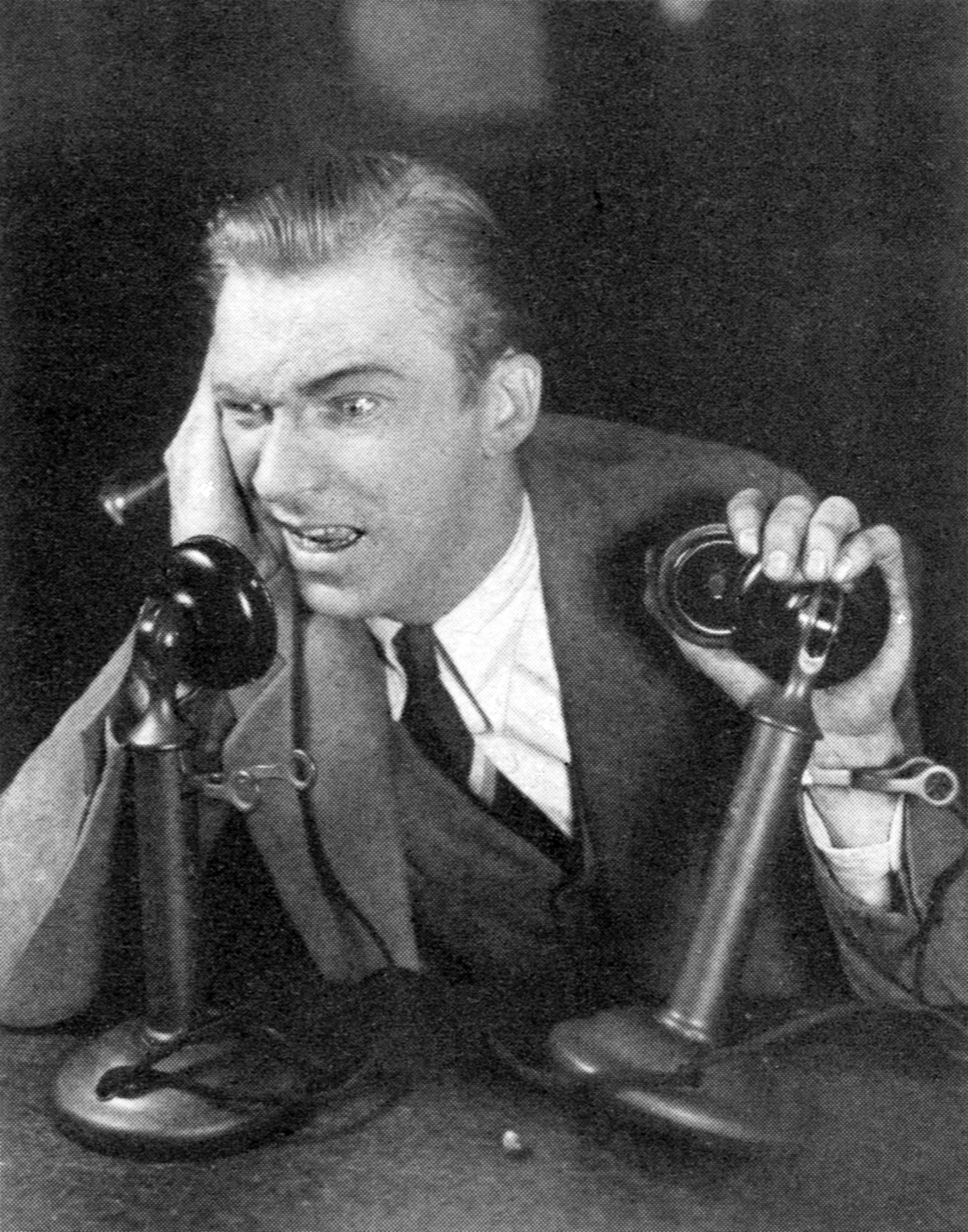
- Tracy in the 1928 Broadway production of The Front Page
- Born: William Lee Tracy; April 14, 1898; Atlanta, Georgia, U.S.
- Died: October 18, 1968 (aged 70); Santa Monica, California, U.S.
- Occupation: Actor
- Years active: 1920–1965
- Spouse(s): Helen Thomas Wyse (m.1938–1968; his death)

William Lee Tracy (April 14, 1898 – October 18, 1968) was an American stage, film, and television actor. He is known foremost for his portrayals between the late 1920s and 1940s of fast-talking, wisecracking news reporters, press agents, lawyers, and salesmen. From 1949 to 1954, he was also featured in the weekly radio and television versions of the series Martin Kane: Private Eye, as well as starring as the newspaper columnist Lee Cochran in the 1958–1959 British-American crime drama New York Confidential. In 1960 he was nominated for a Tony Award for Best Actor in a Play for his performance in the original theatrical version of The Best Man. Later, in 1964, he was nominated for an Academy Award for Best Supporting Actor and a Golden Globe for his supporting role in the film version of The Best Man.

== Early life and stage career ==
Born in 1898 in Atlanta, Georgia, Tracy was the only child of Ray (née Griffith) and William L. Tracy, a railroader. His father's profession often required the family to relocate, so young Tracy grew up in a variety of locations, including Atlanta, Louisville, Kansas City, St. Louis, and later Sayre, Pennsylvania, where his father was employed as superintendent of a locomotive shop. Lee during his teenage years studied at the Western Military Academy in Alton, Illinois and graduated from that preparatory school before briefly attending Union College in New York to pursue a degree in electrical engineering. His studies there were interrupted by his induction into the United States Army during the final weeks of World War I. Although he served in the army for only a short time, he quickly rose to the rank of second lieutenant, a promotion likely attributable to his prior education at Western Military Academy and to his knowledge in engineering.

Soon after his discharge from the army, Tracy decided to alter his career plans, abandoning engineering and turning instead to acting and to working in local stage productions. As early as 1920, in that year's federal census for Pennsylvania, he officially identifies his occupation as "actor, theatrical company". His rise in the ranks in theatre, as in his brief military service, proved to be rapid. After performing for two years in productions with traveling companies, Tracy began performing regularly in vaudeville in New York, earning a steady salary of $35 a week. By 1924 he made his Broadway debut in the original production of George Kelly's play The Show-Off. Two years later, he starred in the hit production of Broadway, for which he received the New York Drama Critics Award. Then, in 1928, his stage performance as the "hard-drinking, fast talking" news reporter Hildy Johnson in the original Broadway production of The Front Page received widespread popular and critical acclaim.

== Film career ==
In 1929, Tracy arrived in Hollywood, where he played a news reporter in several films, although he was not cast in that role for the 1931 screen version of The Front Page. Despite Tracy's success portraying the character Hildy Johnson in the Broadway production, the film's producers didn't think he had enough star power to attract large audiences to movie theaters. They instead cast Pat O'Brien in the part. Undeterred, Tracy continued to gain admirers of his work among studio executives and moviegoers. Rather than signing with a single studio, Tracy freelanced among various studios.

In 1932 Harry Cohn, president of then-minor-league Columbia Pictures, wanted to hire Lee Tracy but was concerned about Tracy's fondness for alcohol. Cohn's biographer Bob Thomas quotes from Cohn's discussion with Tracy:

"Will you give me your promise you'll never take a drink during a picture?" Cohn asked. "No, I won't promise," Tracy replied. "I'm telling you that I never drink when I'm doing a picture -- except on Saturday night, and then I might not know my own name."

"I want your promise," Cohn insisted. "I won't give it to you," Tracy declared. "Before she passed away, my own mother asked me to promise never to take a drink. I wouldn't do it. I didn't want to promise her something I couldn't keep. Now if I wouldn't promise my own mother, I'm certainly not going to promise you."

Cohn stared at Tracy for a moment. The injection of motherhood had a curious effect on him. "That's good enough for me," he said. Lee Tracy made three films for Columbia -- Washington Merry-Go-Round, The Night Mayor, and Carnival -- all without mishap.

In 1932 Tracy again received praise for his portrayal of Alvin Roberts, a Walter Winchell-type gossip columnist, in Blessed Event (1932). That same year, he played Lupe Vélez's frenetic manager in Gregory LaCava's The Half-Naked Truth. The year 1933 attracted further attention to Tracy as he starred as a columnist in Advice to the Lovelorn and portrayed John Barrymore's agent in the director George Cukor's highly successful production Dinner at Eight.

Lee Tracy's flourishing film career was temporarily disrupted on November 19, 1933, while he was on location in Mexico filming Viva Villa! with Wallace Beery. Tracy made an insulting gesture from a Mexico City balcony. There are two versions of what happened. The popular anecdote, as recounted by the actor and producer Desi Arnaz in his autobiography A Book (1976), has Tracy standing on the balcony and urinating down onto a passing military parade. Elsewhere in his autobiography, Arnaz claims that from then on, if one watched other crowds of spectators, they would visibly disperse any time an American stepped out onto a balcony. However, other crew members there at the time disputed this story, giving a sharply different account of events. In his autobiography, Charles G. Clarke, who photographed the picture, said that he was standing outside the hotel during the parade and the incident never happened. Tracy, he said, was standing on the balcony observing the parade when a Mexican in the street below made an obscene gesture at him. Tracy replied in kind; and the next day a local newspaper printed a story that, in effect, Tracy had insulted Mexico, Mexicans in general, and their national flag in particular. The story caused an uproar in Mexico, and MGM decided to remove Tracy from the production so authorities would allow the studio to continue filming there. Actor Stuart Erwin replaced Tracy. The film's original director, Howard Hawks, refused to testify against Tracy and was also fired from the project. Jack Conway replaced him.

After Tracy was released from MGM, he resumed freelancing with other studios until 1936, when he signed with RKO Radio Pictures. He remained there through 1940, making seven feature films.

In 1942 he announced plans to partner with Jack Schwarz and co-produce a series of feature films for PRC release, only to forsake the deal when he was accepted by the U. S. Army for military service. Just before he reported for duty as a first lieutenant in the Army Military Police Corps, Tracy did manage to make one quickie feature with Schwarz, The Payoff (1942). Motion Picture Herald called it "by far the best picture to come from Producers Releasing Corp. Lee Tracy, with all the fire of The Front Page, returns to the screen before reporting to the Army, and does exceptionally well with the part of the reporter."

== Radio and television ==
Tracy's career after the war focused increasingly on radio work and performing on the rapidly expanding medium of television. Between 1949 and 1954, he performed on both the radio and televised versions of the weekly series Martin Kane: Private Eye, in which he was one of four actors to play the title role. In 1958, he returned to the role of newspaper reporter in the syndicated series New York Confidential.

Tracy did continue to return periodically to the big screen. In 1964, he portrayed the former president of the United States "Art Hockstader", a fictitious character loosely based on Harry Truman, in both the stage and film adaptations of Gore Vidal's novel The Best Man. The movie version featured Henry Fonda and Cliff Robertson. Tracy received his only Academy Award nomination, as Best Supporting Actor, for his performance in the film.

== Personal life and death ==
In July 1938, he wed Helen Thomas Wyse (also cited as Wyze) in a small ceremony at the home of a Presbyterian minister in Yuma, Arizona. The couple remained together over 30 years, until Lee's death. They had no children.

Tracy's final acting performance was in the role of Father Maurice Britt in the Broadway production Minor Miracle in 1965. Three years later, after being diagnosed with advanced liver cancer, he underwent surgery at St. John's Hospital in Santa Monica, California to treat the disease. His condition following the operation steadily worsened over "several months", and on October 16, 1968, the 70-year-old actor had to re-enter the hospital, where he died two days later. He was buried beside his parents at Evergreen Cemetery in Shavertown, Pennsylvania.

== Filmography ==
- Salute (1929) as Radio Announcer (uncredited)
- Big Time (1929) as Eddie Burns
- Born Reckless (1930) as Bill O'Brien
- Liliom (1930) as The Buzzard
- She Got What She Wanted (1930) as Eddie
- The Strange Love of Molly Louvain (1932) as Scotty Cornell
- Love Is a Racket (1932) as Stanley Fiske
- Doctor X (1932) as Lee Taylor
- The Night Mayor (1932) as Mayor Bobby Kingston
- Blessed Event (1932) as Alvin Roberts
- Washington Merry-Go-Round (1932) as Button Gwinnett Brown
- The Half-Naked Truth (1932) as Jimmy Bates
- Clear All Wires! (1933) as Buckley Joyce Thomas
- Private Jones (1933) as Pvt. William "Bill" Jones
- The Nuisance (1933) as Joseph Phineas "Joe" Stevens
- Dinner at Eight (1933) as Max Kane
- Turn Back the Clock (1933) as Joe Gimlet
- Bombshell (1933) as Space Hanlon
- Advice to the Lovelorn (1933) as Toby Prentiss
- I'll Tell the World (1934) as Stanley Brown
- You Belong to Me (1934) as Bud Hannigan
- The Lemon Drop Kid (1934) as Wally Brooks
- Carnival (1935) as Chick Thompson
- Two-Fisted (1935) as Hap Hurley
- Pirate Party on Catalina Isle (1935, Short) as Pirate (uncredited)
- Sutter's Gold (1936) as Pete Perkin
- Wanted! Jane Turner (1936) as Tom Mallory
- Criminal Lawyer (1937) as Brandon
- Behind the Headlines (1937) as Eddie Haines
- Crashing Hollywood (1938) as Michael Winslow
- Fixer Dugan (1939) as Charlie "The Fixer" Dugan
- The Spellbinder (1939) as Jed Marlowe
- Millionaires in Prison (1940) as Nick Burton
- The Payoff (1942) as Brad McKay
- Power of the Press (1943) as Griff Thompson
- Betrayal from the East (1945) as Eddie Carter
- I'll Tell the World (1945) as Gabriel Patton
- High Tide (1947) as Hugh Fresney
- Come Out Fighting (1950, TV Movie) as Stick Keenan
- The Best Man (1964) as President Art Hockstader
- Steptoe and Son (1965, TV Movie) as Albert (final film role)

== Radio appearances ==
Year	Program	Episode/source
1945	Old Gold Comedy Theatre	Boy Meets Girl
