= Men Against the Sky =

- Theatrical film poster
- Directed by: Leslie Goodwins
- Screenplay by: Nathanael West
- Story by: John Twist
- Produced by: Howard Benedict
- Starring: Richard Dix; Kent Taylor; Edmund Lowe; Wendy Barrie
- Cinematography: Frank Redman
- Edited by: Desmond Marquette
- Music by: Frank Tours; Roy Webb
- Production company: RKO Radio Pictures
- Distributed by: RKO Radio Pictures
- Release date: September 6, 1940
- Running time: 75 minutes
- Country: United States
- Language: English

Men Against the Sky is a 1940 drama starring Richard Dix, Kent Taylor, Edmund Lowe and Wendy Barrie. Directed by Leslie Goodwins, it is based on a story by John Twist about the challenges of aircraft development and the dangers of test piloting in the period before World War II.

The screenplay is by novelist Nathanael West.

== Plot ==
Phil Mercedes (Richard Dix), once a record-setting pilot with a fame resembling Charles Lindbergh's, is now an aging alcoholic. Reduced to his carnival roots to an air show performer, he crashes his stunt aircraft into a barn while drunk and is grounded for a year. His sister Kay (Wendy Barrie), becomes his only means of support. She hopes to land a job in the drafting department of McLean Aircraft, working for chief engineer Martin Ames (Kent Taylor).

With war already underway in Europe and the U.S. rearming for its inevitable entry, McLean hopes to win a big contract with the Air Force. Although Kay is not very skilled, she shows Ames some drawings Phil made. The creative designs interest company owner Dan McLean (Edmund Lowe), who approves the construction of a high-speed fighter aircraft. Preliminary tests of the plane prove disastrous, with arrogant test pilot Dick Allerton (Donald Briggs) - unsuccessful in elbowing his way between Kay and a still disinterested Ames - contending that it is too dangerous to fly.

With the test craft grounded by a watchful civil air authority, Phil jumps in and attempts a successful flight test to save McLean from financial ruin - and keep everyone involved in the project going. Instead, a wing shears off and Phil is only able to save his life by parachuting. He is grounded for life for his reckless insubordination.

With a redesign of the wings, the Army Air Force is invited to test the airplane, bringing its own pilot. The plane passes every test, including the crucial high-speed dive, but the landing gear will not extend fully, leaving the test pilot vainly circling the airport. Once again death looms, as does a barely postponed McLean bankruptcy. Once again Phil comes to the rescue, heading off a pilot bail-out and consequent destruction of the only prototype aircraft by being taken aloft in a two-seat plane in an attempt to use his wing-walking skills to free the stuck landing gear. Ultimately he leaves the safety of the rescue airplane and clings to a wheel strut, trying to use his weight to jar it free. When that fails he releases his chute, hoping that the added drag will do the trick. The wheels won't budge...but his chute gets caught on the tailwheel, ripping it. Not realizing this - and having no choice anyway, nor a reserve chute to deploy - Phil lets go, rides a "streamer" down to the ground. Miraculously, the landing gear opens fully, the pilot makes a safe landing, and the potential giant contract with the government is saved.

But not Phil. Gravely wounded on impact, he is able to exchange felicitations with Kay and die in Ames' arms, thereby giving his blessing to their union.

== Cast ==
- Richard Dix as Phil Mercedes
- Kent Taylor as Martin Ames
- Edmund Lowe as Daniel M. "Dan" McLean
- Wendy Barrie as Kay Mercedes, aka Kay Green
- Granville Bates as Mr. Burdett
- Grant Withers as Mr. Grant
- Donald Briggs as Dick Allerton
- Charles Quigley as Flynn
- Selmer Jackson as Capt. Sanders
- Lee Bonnell as Capt. Wallen

== Production ==
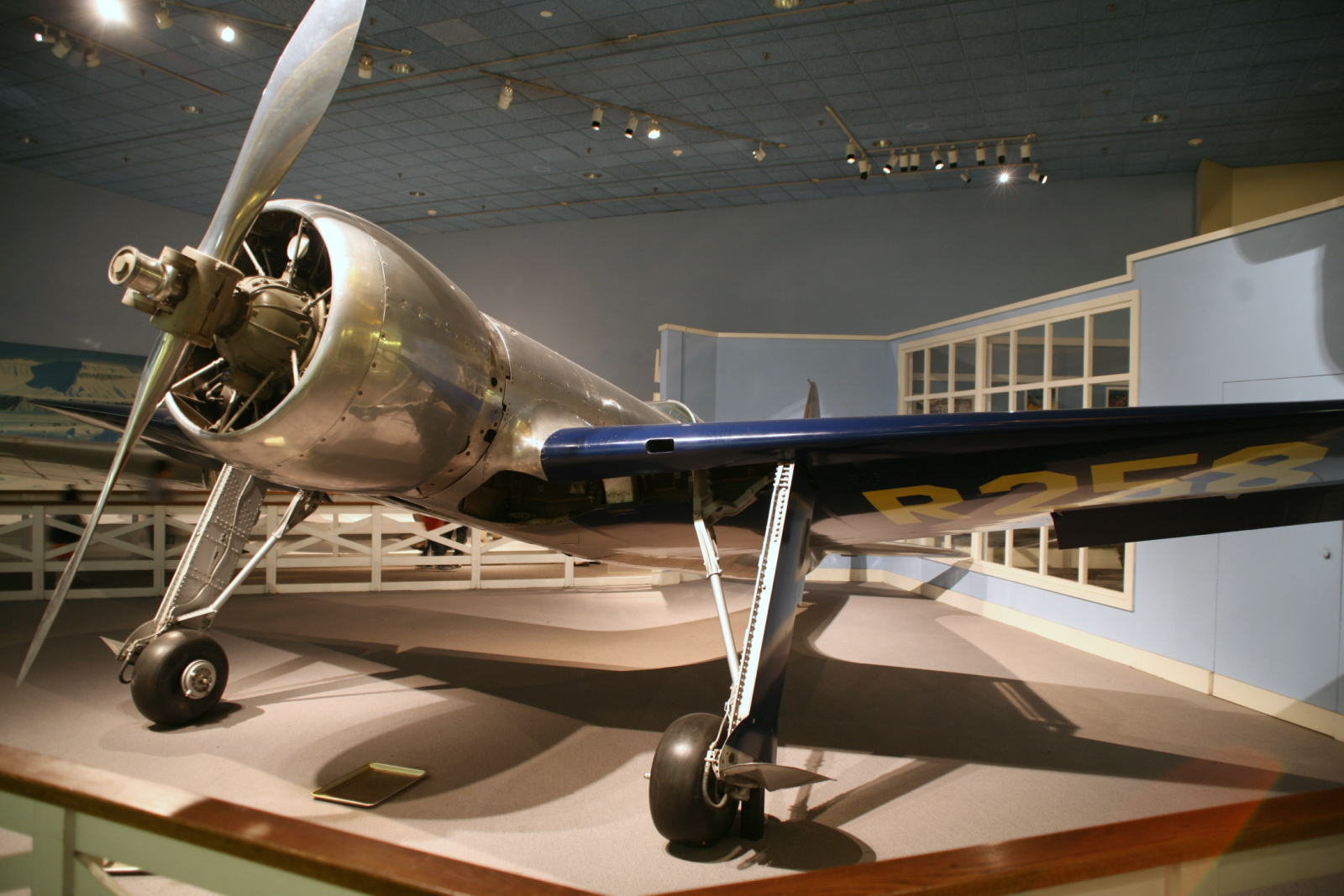
The Hughes H-1 Racer featured prominently in Men Against the Sky

Novelist Nathanael West was involved in a number of B films in this period, including Men Against the Sky, but recognition of his work was short-lived. Along with his wife Eileen, he was killed in a car crash on December 22, 1940, when West (a notoriously bad driver) ran a stop sign in Southern California. Principal photography for Men Against the Sky took place from late May to June 15, 1940.

According to The Hollywood Reporter, Lucille Ball, considered Hollywood's B movie queen, was to play the female lead before Wendy Barrie came on board. Paul Mantz, noted movie stunt pilot, was the aviation consultant. Models were used to simulate accidents, but takeoff and in-flight footage of the experimental Hughes H-1 Racer taken during its trials was used for realism as a substitute for the McLean test aircraft.

== Reception ==
Men Against the Sky was generally considered a popular entry in the aviation film genre, although not of the same caliber as Test Pilot (1938) or Men With Wings (1938), which explored the same subject. Bosley Crowther of The New York Times in a contemporary review, characterized Men Against the Sky as a "generally entertaining little action picture," although he criticized its "maudlin heroics," called the storyline "routine and obvious", and characterized the performances as "stock and pedestrian."
