= Even Stephen =

Even Stephen is a play written by Nathanael West and S. J. Perelman in 1934. The play is a three-act satire dealing with the adventures of Diana Breed Latimer, a best-selling novelist, who visits a women's college in New England to research her next book, an exposé of the romantic lives of young women on campus. The play has never been produced or published, and is currently collected with other Perelman and West papers at Brown University, which they both attended.

== Production attempts ==
West and Perelman finished the play in the summer of 1934 and hoped the play might be staged on Broadway that fall, but it was rejected by several producers, including Max Gordon. In 1936 West sent Perelman a letter repeating an earlier suggestion to try to find an agent for the play. He suggested that if Perelman thought it would damage their reputations, they could use a pseudonym, perhaps "Diana Breed Latimer", the play's protagonist. After West's death in 1940 Perelman revised the play, but no one was interested in producing it.
