= A Cool Million =

1934 novel by Nathanael West

- 1961 reprint cover
- Author: Nathanael West
- Language: English
- Genre: Parody, farce
- Published: 1934 (Covici-Friede)
- Publication place: United States
- Media type: Print (hardback & paperback)
- Pages: 229 pp
- Preceded by: Miss Lonelyhearts

A Cool Million: The Dismantling of Lemuel Pitkin is Nathanael West's third novel, published in 1934. It is a brutal satire of Horatio Alger's novels and their eternal optimism.

== Plot summary ==
A Cool Million, as its subtitle suggests, presents "the dismantling of Lemuel Pitkin," piece by piece. As a satire of the Horatio Alger myth of success, the novel is evocative of Voltaire's Candide, which satirized the philosophical optimism of Gottfried Wilhelm Leibniz and Alexander Pope. Pitkin is a typical "schlemiel", stumbling from one situation to the next; he is robbed, cheated, unjustly arrested, frequently beaten and exploited. In a parallel plot, Betty Prail, Pitkin's love interest, is raped, abused, and sold into prostitution. Over the course of the novel, Pitkin loses an eye, his teeth, his thumb, his scalp and his leg, but nevertheless retains his optimism and gullibility to the inevitably bitter end.

Pitkin's troubles, however, do not end with his death. He is exploited as a martyr by the National Revolutionary Party, a political organization led by right-wing populist Shagpoke Whipple, a failed banker and manipulative former American president. Pitkin's birthday becomes a national holiday, and American youths march down the streets singing songs in his honor. Whipple speaks out against aliens and calls for a rejection of "sophistication, Marxism and International Capitalism." The novel ends with a series of roaring "hails" from the crowd.

== Literary significance and criticism ==
Pitkin's pathetic inability to conform to society's standards, or to the "American" way of life, is the main cause of his repeated failures. Nevertheless, there is something admirable in Pitkin's naïve persistence, as West wrote in a letter to S. J. Perelman:

Suppose he had the Horatio Alger slant and was a guy who was trying to get one foot on the ladder of success and they were always moving the ladder on him, but they couldn’t touch the dream.

West not only parodies Alger by mimicking his prose style, but he also lifted several passages directly from a number of different Alger novels.

In A Cool Million, West presents Italian slavers, Chinese pimps, brutal Irish cops, and greedy Jewish lawyers. Though most of the early criticism dismissed the novel as too direct a parody to have any real literary merit, it is seen by some as an early example of postmodernism.

Harold Bloom includes A Cool Million in his list of canonical works of the period he names the Chaotic Age (1900–present) in The Western Canon. Bloom also deems the rhetoric used by Shagpoke Whipple as prophetic of such presidents as Ronald Reagan.

== Publication history ==
West began writing A Cool Million in the fall of 1933. A handwritten first draft was completed in November. Though Harcourt, Brace rejected the novel, West continued to work on it until it was finally accepted by Covici-Friede in March 1934. The novel was published in New York City in an edition of 3,000 copies to mixed reviews and poor sales; it was not reprinted in West's lifetime. The novel later appeared in several reprints starting from 1940, following West's renewed fame, and was collected in a single volume edition of the complete novels, as well as in the Library of America edition of West's collected works.

== A Cool Million – a screen story ==
In September 1940, West wrote an original screen story in collaboration with Boris Ingster. They used A Cool Million as their title, though the story had nothing to do with the novel, hoping that a studio would pay more for a story allegedly based on a published book. West was certain that no one would actually read the book to check whether the screen story had any relation to the novel. On September 24, 1940, Columbia Pictures bought the story for $10,000 and assigned it to screenwriter Sidney Buchman. However, the studio soon abandoned the project, and A Cool Million was never filmed. The text of the screen story appears in the Library of America's edition of West's work.
