= Good Hunting (play) =

Good Hunting is a 1938 play written by Nathanael West, in collaboration with Joseph Schrank. The play, a satire about World War I, opened in New York City on November 21, 1938, and ran for two performances.

== Process of writing ==
West met Schrank in 1936 and suggested that they collaborate on a play. They discussed ideas for the play over several weeks, after which Schrank dictated a 40-page outline to a secretary. West used the outline to write a first draft, which he completed in May 1937. Schrank revised West's draft during the summer, and West produced a third version by October. In February 1938, Jerome Mayer, a Broadway producer, agreed to stage the play, then titled Gentlemen, the War!; over the summer West and Schrank made further revisions, finally retitling the play Good Hunting.
