= The Day of the Locust =

1939 novel by Nathanael West

- 1939 first edition cover
- Author: Nathanael West
- Language: English
- Publisher: Random House
- Publication date: May 16, 1939
- Publication place: United States
- Media type: Print (hardback & paperback)
- Pages: 238 pp
- ISBN: 978-0-451-52348-8
- OCLC: 22865781
- Preceded by: A Cool Million
- Text: The Day of the Locust online

The Day of the Locust is a 1939 novel by American author Nathanael West set in Hollywood, California. The novel follows a young artist from the Yale School of Fine Arts named Tod Hackett, who has been hired by a Hollywood studio to do scene design and painting. While he works, he plans an important painting to be called "The Burning of Los Angeles", a portrayal of the chaotic and fiery holocaust which will destroy the city. While the cast of characters Tod befriends are a conglomerate of Hollywood stereotypes, his greater discovery is a part of society whose "eyes filled with hatred", and "had come to California to die". This undercurrent of society captures the despair of Americans who worked and saved their entire lives only to realize, too late, that the American dream was a fraud. Their anger boils into rage, and the craze over the latest Hollywood premiere erupts violently into mob rule and absolute chaos.

In the introduction to The Day of the Locust, Richard Gehman writes that the novel was "more ambitious" than West's earlier novel Miss Lonelyhearts, and "showed marked progress in West's thinking and in his approach toward maturity as a writer." Gehman calls the novel "episodic in structure, but panoramic in form".

== Characters ==
=== Major characters ===
- Tod Hackett – an Ivy League-trained artist who comes to California to find inspiration for his painting and experiences a violent re-visioning of the painting in a nearly literal sink-or-swim moment that nearly claims his life during the mob scene outside Mr. Kahn's Pleasure Dome. Tod is hired by the movie studio to paint and decorate sets.
- Homer Simpson – a former accountant at a hotel in Iowa who comes to California at the recommendation of his doctor to restore his health. Soft-mannered, sexually repressed, and socially ill-at-ease, Homer's almost constant inner turmoil is expressed through his huge hands which have an uncontrollable and detached nature to them. He acts as a sponsor to Faye Greener.
- Faye Greener – an aspiring Hollywood actress who realizes that she has the face and body for Hollywood, but cannot admit that she lacks a significant talent and struggles to compete for even extra parts.

=== Secondary characters ===
- Abe Kusich – an adult dwarf bookie/hustler and friend of Faye and Harry Greener.
- Claude Estee – a successful but cynical screenwriter.
- Earle Shoop – a fake California cowboy who makes a scant salary working at a western wear and novelty shop. He camps out in the hills above Los Angeles with Miguel. Earle tries to date Faye.
- Miguel – a Mexican, Earle's sidekick. Miguel keeps roosters for cockfighting. Faye sleeps with Miguel.
- Mrs. Jenning – runs a prostitution service and pornographic film parlor.
- Harry Greener – Faye's father, a third-rate vaudevillian from the East who is chronically ill. When he cannot get a performing gig he peddles home-made silver polish, but it is more of an opportunity to work his clowning and schtick than to provide a meaningful income.
- Adore Loomis – a precocious child actor who teases Homer until he snaps. Homer's stomping Adore to death coincides with the eruption of mob violence outside the blockbuster film premiere.

West's characters are intentionally shallow, stereotyped stock characters, and "derive from all the B-grade genre films of the period". They are what James Light calls "grotesques". In the first chapter of the novel, the narrative voice announces: "Yes, despite his appearance, Tod was really a very complicated young man with a whole set of personalities, one inside the other like a nest of Chinese boxes."

== Plot summary ==
Tod Hackett is the novel's protagonist. He moves from the East coast to Hollywood, California in search of inspiration for his next painting. The novel is set in the 1930s during the Great Depression. Most of the characters exist at the fringes of the Hollywood film industry, but Hollywood is merely the backdrop for Tod Hackett's revelation. Tod is employed by a Hollywood studio "to learn set and costume designing." During his spare time, Tod sketches scenes he observes on large production sets and studio back lots. The novel details Tod's observation of the filming of the Battle of Waterloo. His goal is to find inspiration for the painting he is getting ready to begin, a work titled "The Burning of Los Angeles."

Tod falls in love with Faye Greener, an aspiring starlet who lives nearby but Faye only loves men who are good looking or wealthy. She is beautiful but lacks the acting talent to progress beyond roles as an extra. Tod is simply a "good-hearted man," the kind Faye likes. He imagines that loving her would compare to jumping from a skyscraper and screaming to the ground. Tod wants to "throw himself [at her], no matter what the cost." Throughout the novel, Tod fantasizes about having a sexual encounter with Faye as an act of rape. Every time he imagines raping her, reality interrupts his fantasy before he can complete the act. Scenes are interrupted prior to their climax frequently throughout the novel. A patron jokes that it is "the old teaser routine," when a pornographic film viewing at Mrs. Jenning's parlor ends unexpectedly due to technical difficulties.

Between his work at the studio and his introduction to Faye's friends, Tod interacts with numerous Hollywood hangers-on. Characters like Abe Kusich, the dwarf; Claude Estee, the successful screenwriter; and Earle Shoop, the fake California cowboy, all of whom have difficulty changing their personas from the characters they play to who they are. As a result, there is a clear sense of acting and fakery that spills beyond the confines of Hollywood studios and into the streets of Los Angeles.

Shortly after moving into a neighborhood in the valley, Tod befriends Homer Simpson, a simple-minded bookkeeper from Iowa who moved to California for health reasons. Homer Simpson's "unruly hands" operate independently from his body, and their movements are often mechanical. "They demanded special attention, had always demanded it." When Homer attempts to escape California he is distracted not only by the crowd but his inability to leave the street despite Tod's help and insistent encouragement. A neighbor's son, the child actor Adore Loomis, finds Homer and torments him until Homer violently lashes out against the boy. The novel's climactic riot ensues and the chaos surrounding the latest Hollywood premiere turns violent outside Mr. Khan's Pleasure Dome. Tod vividly revises "The Burning of Los Angeles" in his mind, while being pushed around in the human waves of the riot. The final scene plays out, uninterrupted. The conclusion of the novel can be read as a moment of epiphany and mental clarity for the artist, or a complete "mental breakdown" and Tod's "incorporation into the mechanized, modern world of Los Angeles."

== Themes ==
The characters are outcasts, who have come to Hollywood to fulfill a dream or wish: "The importance of the wish in West's work was first noted by W. H. Auden, who declared (in one of the interludes in The Dyer's Hand) that West's novels were essentially "parables about a Kingdom of Hell whose ruler is not so much a Father of Lies as a Father of Wishes". In this respect, James Light, in his book Violence, Dreams, and Dostoevsky: The Art of Nathanael West, suggests that The Day of the Locust falls in with a motif in West's fiction; the exposure of hopeful narratives in modern American culture as frauds.

As some critics point out, West's novel was a radical challenge to modernist literature. Some modernists set themselves up in opposition to mass culture; West depicts it and makes it an integral part of the novel. West's use of grotesque imagery and situations establishes the novel as a work of Juvenalian satire. His critique of Hollywood and the mentality of "the masses" depicts an America sick with vanity and the harbor of a malignant sense of perversity.

=== Biblical allusions ===
The original title of the novel was The Cheated. The title of West's work may be a biblical allusion to the Old Testament. Susan Sanderson writes:

The most famous literary or historical reference to locusts is in the Book of Exodus in the Bible, in which God sends a plague of locusts to the pharaoh of Egypt as retribution for refusing to free the enslaved Jews. Millions of locusts swarm over the lush fields of Egypt, destroying its food supplies. Destructive locusts also appear in the New Testament in the symbolic and apocalyptic book of Revelation. West's use of "locust" in his title evokes images of destruction and a land stripped bare of anything green and living. The novel is filled with images of destruction: Tod Hackett's painting entitled "The Burning of Los Angeles," his violent fantasies about Faye and the bloody result of the cockfight. A close examination of West's characters and his selective use of natural images, which include representations of violence and impotence — and which are therefore contrary to popular images linking nature and fertility — reveals that the locust in the title is Tod.

=== Symbols and metaphors ===
The novel opens with protagonist Tod Hackett sketching studio back lot scenes from a major Hollywood production. In the scene, a short fat man barks orders through a megaphone to actors playing the role of Napoleon's elite cavalry at the Battle of Waterloo. Waterloo marked the beginning of the end for Napoleon. The chaos of this scene foreshadows the beginning of the end for middle-class Americans in the novel, and the violence that ensues.

James F. Light suggests that West's use of mob violence in the novel is an expression of anxiety about the rise of fascism in Europe. Light compares anxiety in the novel to personal anxieties Jews, like Nathanael West, experienced as marginalized individuals living in America. The artist Tod Hackett's vision of art, a painting titled “The Burning of Los Angeles,” devolves into a nightmare of terror. It depicts angry citizens razing Los Angeles and spreading, uncontrollably, across the American landscape. In the 1930s, theorists, politicians, and military leaders feared large crowds or mass formations would produce unpredictable and dangerous results.

== Reception ==
Novelists of his era praised Nathanael West's writing, but notoriety and critical acclaim for his works lagged behind those for his peers in terms of readers and book sales. The Day of the Locust only sold about 1,480 copies following its first publishing. Critics began to situate The Day of the Locust within the literary canon in the 1950s, more than a decade after a fatal car crash claimed the author's life. In 1998, the Modern Library ranked The Day of the Locust seventy-third on its list of the 100 best English-language novels of the 20th century. Time magazine included the novel in its list of 100 best English-language novels from 1923 to 2005. Critic Harold Bloom included it in his list of canonical works in the book The Western Canon.

In 2015, BBC Radio 3 broadcast a 45-minute program dedicated to The Day of the Locust, heralding it as a major twentieth century classic. The show's host, historian Adam Smith, related the roots of the novel to the political situation of the time. He contrasted the message of the novel to the lives of Ronald Reagan, who would go on to become Governor of California, and Richard Nixon, who was "already shaping his skills at 'doing the people's hating for them'".

== Adaptations ==
The Day of the Locust was released by Paramount Pictures in 1975. The film was directed by John Schlesinger and starred William Atherton as Tod Hackett, Donald Sutherland as Homer Simpson, Burgess Meredith as Harry Greener, and Karen Black as Faye Greener.

The 1970s Pop Chronicles audio documentary includes an excerpt dramatically read by Thom Beck in Show 44, "Revolt of the Fat Angel: Some samples of the Los Angeles sound."

== In popular culture ==
- The 1982 song "Call of the West" by the Los Angeles new wave band Wall of Voodoo—which "follows some Middle American sad sack as he chases a vague and hopeless dream in California"—has been described as being "as close as pop music has gotten to capturing the bitter chaos of the final chapter of Nathanael West's The Day of the Locust".
- Matt Groening, the creator of The Simpsons, wrote a novel while he was in high school. One of the character's names in the novel is Homer Simpson. "I took that name from a minor character in the novel The Day of the Locust... Since Homer was my father's name, and I thought Simpson was a funny name in that it had the word “simp” in it, which is short for “simpleton”—I just went with it."
