= Miss Lonelyhearts =

1933 novella by Nathanael West

- 1949 first UK edition cover
- Author: Nathanael West
- Language: English
- Publisher: Liveright
- Publication date: April 8, 1933
- Publication place: United States
- Media type: Print (Hardcover, Paperback)
- Pages: 208
- Preceded by: The Dream Life of Balso Snell

Miss Lonelyhearts is a novella by Nathanael West. He began writing it early in 1930 and completed the manuscript in November 1932. Published in 1933, it is an Expressionist black comedy set in New York City during the Great Depression. It is about a male newspaper advice columnist who provides advice to lonesome people. He becomes so affected by their desperate letters that he spirals into depression, drinking, and ill-considered sexual affairs, which lead to his downfall.

== Synopsis ==
In the story, Miss Lonelyhearts is the pseudonym for an unnamed male newspaper columnist writing an advice column for the lovelorn and lonesome, a duty that the other newspaper staff consider to be a joke. As Miss Lonelyhearts reads letters from desperate New Yorkers, he feels terribly burdened and falls into a cycle of depression, accompanied by heavy drinking and occasional bar fights. He is also the victim of the pranks and cynical advice of Shrike, his feature editor at the newspaper.

Miss Lonelyhearts tries several approaches to escape the terribly painful letters he has to read: religion, trips to the countryside with his fiancée Betty, and sexual affairs with Shrike's wife and Mrs. Doyle, a reader of his column. However, Miss Lonelyhearts's efforts do not seem to ameliorate his situation. After his sexual encounter with Mrs. Doyle, he meets her husband, a poor crippled man. The Doyles invite Miss Lonelyhearts to have dinner with them. When he arrives, Mrs. Doyle tries to force herself on him, but he physically pushes her away. Mrs. Doyle tells her husband that Miss Lonelyhearts tried to rape her.

In the last scene, Mr. Doyle hides a gun inside a rolled newspaper and decides to take revenge on Miss Lonelyhearts. Lonelyhearts, who has just experienced a religious enlightenment after three days of sickness, runs toward Mr. Doyle to embrace him. The gun "explodes", and the two men roll down a flight of stairs together.

== Major themes ==
The general tone of the novel is one of extreme disillusionment with Depression-era American society, a consistent theme in West's novels. However, the novel is a black comedy, characterized by a dark sense of humor and irony. Justus Neiland, among others, has pointed out the use of laughter influenced by philosopher Henri Bergson, in which "the attitudes, gestures, and movements of the human body are laughable in exact proportion as that body reminds us of a machine."

Literature professors Diane Hoeveler and Rita Bernard analyzed the novel through a Marxist lens as a condemnation of Marx's theory of alienation and the colonization of social life by commodification, foreshadowing the stance of the Situationists and Guy Debord in particular. Miss Lonelyhearts is unable to fulfill his role as advice-giver in a world in which both people and advice (in the form of newspaper ads, for example) are mass-produced. People are machines for the sole purpose of laboring and producing value as far as the rest of society is concerned (thus Miss Lonelyhearts' name), and any advice for them is as mass-produced as an instruction manual for a machine. Lonelyhearts is unable to find a personal solution to his problems because they have systemic causes. West, who worked in the newspaper business before writing Miss Lonelyhearts, is also an advice giver of a sort as a novelist. Miss Lonelyhearts is similar to a Situationist détournement because it uses a form to critique the same form. The novel also condemns itself by condemning art, which is repeatedly derided by Shrike and compared to religion as an opiate of the masses.

Many of the problems described in Miss Lonelyhearts describe actual economic conditions in New York City during the Great Depression, although the novella carefully avoids questions of national politics. Moreover, Marian Crowe declared the novella is particularly important due to its existential import. The characters seem to be living in an amoral world. Hence, they resort to heavy drinking, sex, and parties. Miss Lonelyhearts has a "Christ complex", which stands for his belief in religion as a solution to a world devoid of values.

== Adaptations ==
=== 1933 film ===
In 1933, the novella was very loosely adapted as a movie, Advice to the Lovelorn, starring Lee Tracy, produced by Twentieth Century Pictures—before its merger with Fox Film Corporation—and released by United Artists. Greatly changed from the novel, it became a comedy/drama about a hard-boiled reporter who becomes popular when he adopts a female pseudonym and dispenses fatuous advice. He agrees (for a hefty payment) to use the column to recommend a line of medicines, but finds out they are actually harmful drugs when his mother dies. He then agrees to help the police track down the criminals. The movie ends with the main character happily married.

=== 1957 Broadway play ===
In 1957, the novella was adapted into a stage play entitled Miss Lonelyhearts by Howard Teichmann. It opened on Broadway at the Music Box Theatre on October 3, 1957, in a production directed by Alan Schneider and designed by Jo Mielziner and Patricia Zipprodt. It starred Pat O'Brien. It ran for only twelve performances.

=== 1958 film ===
In 1958 the plot was again filmed as Lonelyhearts, starring Montgomery Clift, Robert Ryan, and Myrna Loy, produced by Dore Schary and released by United Artists. Although following the plot of the book more closely than Advice to the Lovelorn, many changes were made. The movie greatly softens the cynical edge of the original book, and the story is once more given a happy ending—the woman's husband is talked out of shooting Miss Lonelyhearts, who finds happiness with his true love, and Shrike is considerably kinder at film's end.

=== 1983 film ===
The novella was adapted by Robert E. Bailey and Michael Dinner into a 1983 TV movie, Miss Lonelyhearts, starring Eric Roberts in the lead role. Eric Roberts would coincidentally play the lead role in the unrelated 1991 film Lonely Hearts.

=== 2006 opera ===
In 2006, composer Lowell Liebermann completed Miss Lonelyhearts, a two-act opera. The libretto was written by J. D. McClatchy. The opera, which received its premiere in 2006 at the Juilliard Opera Center, was commissioned by the Juilliard School for its centennial celebration.

The opera was co-produced by the Thornton School of Music Opera Program at University of Southern California, and received its West Coast premiere at the school in 2007. Both premieres were directed by Thornton faculty member Ken Cazan.

== In popular culture ==
- The character of Guru Brahmin in the 1948 satirical novel The Loved One by Evelyn Waugh was inspired by Miss Lonelyhearts, and the character also appears in the 1965 film adaptation.
- Miss Lonelyhearts is discussed by two of the characters of Philip K. Dick's 1962 novel The Man in the High Castle, Paul Kasoura and Robert Childan.
- "Miss Lonelyhearts' pen" is mentioned in the lyrics of the song "Lost Weekend" by Lloyd Cole and the Commotions.
- In 2013, the Cold War Kids released an album titled Dear Miss Lonelyhearts.
- In Back to the Future Part II, Biff Tannen calls his 2015 counterpart Miss Lonely-Hearts.
