= Nathanael West =

American novelist (1903–1940)

- Born: Nathan Weinstein; October 17, 1903; New York City, U.S.
- Died: December 22, 1940 (aged 37); El Centro, California, U.S.
- Resting place: Mount Zion Cemetery, New York City
- Education: Brown University
- Occupations: Novelist, screenwriter
- Spouse: Eileen McKenney
- Writing career
- Notable works: Miss Lonelyhearts (1933); The Day of the Locust (1939)

Nathanael West (born Nathan Weinstein; October 17, 1903 – December 22, 1940) was an American writer and screenwriter. He is remembered for two darkly satirical novels: Miss Lonelyhearts (1933) and The Day of the Locust (1939), set respectively in the newspaper and Hollywood film industries.

== Early life ==
Nathanael West was born Nathan Weinstein in New York City, the first child of prosperous Ashkenazi Jewish parents Max (Morduch) Weinstein (1878–1932), a construction contractor, and Anuta (Anna, née Wallenstein, 1878–1935), from Kovno, Russia (present-day Kaunas, Lithuania), who lived in a Jewish neighborhood on the Upper West Side. West displayed little ambition in academics, dropping out of high school and only gaining admission into Tufts College by forging his high school transcript.

After being expelled from Tufts, West got into Brown University by appropriating the transcript of a fellow Tufts student, his cousin, Nathan Weinstein. Although West did little schoolwork at Brown, he read extensively. He ignored the realist fiction of his American contemporaries in favor of French surrealists and British and Irish poets of the 1890s, in particular Oscar Wilde. West's interests emphasized unusual literary style as well as unusual content. He became interested in Christianity and mysticism as experienced or expressed through literature and art.

West's friends at Camp Paradox, a summer camp in Adirondack, New York, nicknamed him Pep in ironic reference to his somnolent disposition. West acknowledged and made fun of his lack of physical prowess in recounting the story of a baseball game where he cost his team the game. Wells Root, a close friend of West, remembers hearing this tale half a dozen times, recalling that everyone had placed bets on the game, which came down to the final inning with the score tied and the enemy at bat with two outs. At that point the batter hit a long fly towards West;

He put his hands up to catch it and for some inexplicable reason didn't hold them close together. The ball tore through, hit him in the forehead, and bounced into some brush. There was a roar from the crowd and [West] took one look and turned tail. To a man, the crowd had risen, gathered bats, sticks, stones, and anything they could lay hands on and were in hot pursuit. He vanished into some woods and didn't emerge until nightfall. In telling the story he was convinced that if they had caught him they would have killed him.

It is unclear whether this ever happened, but West later re-imagined this in his short story "Western Union Boy". As Jewish students were not allowed to join most fraternities, his main friend was his future brother-in-law S.J. Perelman. (Perelman married West's sister Laura.) West barely finished at Brown with a degree. He then went to Paris for three months, and it was at this time that he changed his name to Nathanael West. His family, who had supported him thus far, ran into financial difficulties during the late 1920s. West returned home and worked sporadically in construction for his father, eventually finding a job as the night manager of the Hotel Kenmore Hall on East 23rd Street in Manhattan. One of West's experiences at the hotel inspired the incident between Romola Martin and Homer Simpson that appeared in his novel The Day of the Locust (1939).

In 1933 he was employed as the manager of the Sutton Hotel in New York City, located at 330 E. 56th Street.

== Author ==
Although West had been working on his writing since college, it was not until his quiet night job at the hotel that he found the time to put his novel together. It was then that he wrote what became Miss Lonelyhearts (1933). Maxim Lieber served as his literary agent in 1933. In 1931, however, two years before he completed Miss Lonelyhearts, West published The Dream Life of Balso Snell, a novel that he started in college. By then, West was within a group of writers working in and around New York City that included William Carlos Williams and Dashiell Hammett.

In 1933, West bought a farm in eastern Pennsylvania, but he soon got a job as a contract scriptwriter for Columbia Pictures and moved to Hollywood. He published A Cool Million in 1934. None of West's three works sold well, earning him less than $800, so he spent the mid-1930s in financial difficulty, sporadically collaborating on screenplays. Many of the films he worked on were B movies, such as Five Came Back (1939). It was at this time that he wrote The Day of the Locust. He took many of the settings and minor characters of his novel directly from his experience living in a hotel on Hollywood Boulevard.

In November 1939, West was hired as a screenwriter by RKO Radio Pictures, where he collaborated with Boris Ingster on a film adaptation of the novel Before the Fact (1932) by Francis Iles. West and Ingster wrote the screenplay in seven weeks, with West focusing on characterization and dialogue and Ingster focusing on the narrative structure.

RKO assigned the film, eventually released as Suspicion (1941), to Alfred Hitchcock; but Hitchcock already had his own, substantially different, screenplay. Hitchcock's screenplay was written by Samson Raphaelson, Joan Harrison (Hitchcock's secretary), and Alma Reville (Hitchcock's wife). West and Ingster's screenplay was abandoned, but the text can be found in the Library of America's edition of West's collected works.

== Death ==
On December 22, 1940, West and his wife Eileen McKenney were returning to Los Angeles from a hunting trip in Mexico. West ran a stop sign in El Centro, California, resulting in a collision in which he and McKenney were killed. (Their deaths occurred the day after that of their friend F. Scott Fitzgerald.) McKenney had been the inspiration for the title character in the Broadway play My Sister Eileen, and she and West had been scheduled to fly to New York City for the Broadway opening on December 26.

West was buried in Mount Zion Cemetery in Queens, New York, with his wife's ashes placed in his coffin.

== His work ==
Although West was not widely known during his life, his reputation grew after his death, especially with the publication of his collected novels by New Directions in 1957. Miss Lonelyhearts is widely regarded as West's masterpiece. Day of the Locust was made into a film that came out in 1975. Miss Lonelyhearts (1933) was filmed in 1933, 1958 and 1983, produced for the stage in 1957 and opera in 2006. The character "Miss Lonelyhearts" in Hitchcock's film Rear Window has parallels to West's work.

The obscene, garish landscapes of The Day of the Locust gained force in light of the fact that the remainder of the country was living in drab poverty at the time. Though West attended socialist rallies in New York City's Union Square, his novels have no affinity to the novels of his contemporary activist writers such as John Steinbeck and John Dos Passos. West's writing style does not allow the portrayal of positive political causes, as he admitted in a letter to Malcolm Cowley regarding The Day of the Locust: "I tried to describe a meeting of the anti-Nazi league, but it didn't fit and I had to substitute a whorehouse and a dirty film".

West saw the American dream as having been betrayed, both spiritually and materially, and in his writing he presented "a sweeping rejection of political causes, religion, artistic redemption and romantic love". This idea of the corrupt American dream endured long after his death, in the form of the term "West's disease", coined by the poet W.H. Auden to refer to poverty that exists in both a spiritual and economic sense. Jay Martin wrote an extensive biography of West in 1970. Another biography, Lonelyhearts: The Screwball World of Nathanael West and Eileen McKenney, by Marion Meade was published in 2010.

== Published works ==
=== Novels ===
- The Dream Life of Balso Snell (1931)
- Miss Lonelyhearts (1933)
- A Cool Million (1934)
- The Day of the Locust (1939)

=== Plays ===
- Even Stephen (1934, with S.J. Perelman)
- Good Hunting (1938, with Joseph Schrank)

=== Short stories ===
- "Western Union Boy"
- "The Imposter"

=== Posthumous collections ===
- Bercovitch, Sacvan, ed. Nathanael West, Novels and Other Writings (Library of America, 1997) ISBN 978-1-883011-28-4

== Screenplays ==
- Ticket to Paradise (1936)
- Follow Your Heart (1936)
- The President's Mystery (1936)
- Rhythm in the Clouds (1937)
- It Could Happen to You (1937)
- Born to Be Wild (1938)
- Five Came Back (1939)
- I Stole a Million (1939)
- Stranger on the Third Floor (1940)
- The Spirit of Culver (1940)
- Men Against the Sky (1940)
- Let's Make Music (1940)
- Before the Fact (1940, not produced)
