= List of comedy mystery films =

Comedy mystery is a film genre combining elements of comedy and mystery fiction. Though the genre arguably peaked in the 1930s and 1940s, comedy mystery films have been continually produced since.

Below is a chronological list of comedy mystery films.

== 1930s ==
1930

- Ghost Parade
- The Limejuice Mystery or Who Spat in Grandfather's Porridge?
- Raffles

1932

- The Crooked Circle
- Jewel Robbery
- The Penguin Pool Murder
- Strangers of the Evening

1933

- Whistling in the Dark

1934

- Bulldog Drummond Strikes Back
- Death on the Diamond
- Murder on the Blackboard
- The Thin Man

1935

- Murder on a Honeymoon
- One Frightened Night
- Star of Midnight
- Streamline Express
- The Casino Murder Case

1936

- The Ex-Mrs. Bradford
- The Mandarin Mystery
- The Princess Comes Across
- Murder on a Bridle Path
- After the Thin Man
- Satan Met a Lady

1937

- Smart Blonde
- Fly-Away Baby
- The Adventurous Blonde

1938

- Blondes at Work
- Fast Company
- Nancy Drew... Detective
- The Lady Vanishes
- The Mad Miss Manton
- There's Always a Woman
- Tom Sawyer, Detective
- Torchy Blane in Panama
- Torchy Gets Her Man

1939

- The Cat and the Canary
- It's a Wonderful World
- Nancy Drew... Reporter
- Nancy Drew... Trouble Shooter
- Nancy Drew and the Hidden Staircase
- Torchy Blane in Chinatown
- Torchy Runs for Mayor
- Torchy Blane... Playing with Dynamite
- Another Thin Man

== 1940s ==
1940

- His Girl Friday
- Up in the Air

1941

- Footsteps in the Dark
- Murder by Invitation
- Whistling in the Dark - better-known remake, starring Red Skelton
- Shadow of the Thin Man

1942

- A Night to Remember
- One Thrilling Night
- Whistling in Dixie
- Who Done It?

1943

- Whistling in Brooklyn

1944

- Arsenic and Old Lace
- The Case of the Screaming Bishop
- One Body Too Many
- The Thin Man Goes Home

1945

- Lady on a Train
- Scared Stiff

1946

- Dangerous Money

1947

- The Chinese Ring
- Song of the Thin Man

1948

- Docks of New Orleans
- The Golden Eye
- Shanghai Chest

1949

- Abbott and Costello Meet the Killer, Boris Karloff
- Two Knights from Brooklyn

== 1950s ==
1953

- Scared Stiff

1954

- The Runaway Bus

1955

- The Trouble With Harry

== 1960s ==
1960

- Crimen
- Inspector Palmu's Mistake

1963

- Charade
- The Pink Panther

1964

- A Shot in the Dark

1965

- That Darn Cat!

1967

- Catalina Caper

== 1970s ==
1971

- Do Not Fold, Spindle or Mutilate

1973

- The Adventure of Sherlock Holmes' Smarter Brother

1974

- Return of the Pink Panther

1975

- The Black Bird
- One of Our Dinosaurs Is Missing

1976

- Murder By Death
- Peeper
- The Pink Panther Strikes Again
- Silver Streak

1977

- High Anxiety
- The Late Show

1978

- The Big Fix
- The Cheap Detective
- Foul Play
- Revenge of the Pink Panther
- Who Is Killing the Great Chefs of Europe?

== 1980s ==
1980

- The Private Eyes

1982

- Dead Men Don't Wear Plaid
- Deathtrap
- Trail of the Pink Panther

1983

- Curse of the Pink Panther

1984

- Bianca

1985

- Clue
- Desperately Seeking Susan
- Fletch

1986

- The Great Mouse Detective

1987

- Forever, Lulu
- Outrageous Fortune

1988

- Sunset
- Who Framed Roger Rabbit

1989

- The 'Burbs
- Fletch Lives
- Who’s Harry Crumb

== 1990s ==
1990

- Off and Running

1992

- Once Upon a Crime

1993

- Manhattan Murder Mystery
- So I Married an Axe Murderer

1994

- Ace Ventura: Pet Detective
- Radioland Murders

1995

- Ace Ventura: When Nature Calls

1996

- Harriet the Spy

1997

- Zero Effect

1998

- Where's Marlowe?

1999

- Safe House

== 2000s ==
2000

- Phantom of the Megaplex
- Trixie
- Scary Movie

2001

- Head over Heels
- Recess: School's Out

2002

- Get a Clue
- Scooby-Doo

2003

- Looney Tunes: Back in Action

2004

- Scooby-Doo 2: Monsters Unleashed

2005

- Hoodwinked
- Kiss Kiss Bang Bang

2006

- The Pink Panther

2007

- Nancy Drew

2009

- Mystery Team
- The Pink Panther 2
- Scooby-Doo! The Mystery Begins
- Sherlock Holmes

== 2010s ==
2010

- One Hundred Years of Evil
- Tom and Jerry Meet Sherlock Holmes

2011

- A Ghost of a Chance
- Seniors
- Sherlock Holmes: A Game of Shadows

2012

- Ace Attorney

2014

- Agatha Raisin and the Quiche of Death

2015

- Hero

2016

- The Nice Guys
- Zootopia

2018

- Sherlock Gnomes
- A Simple Favor

2019

- Murder Mystery
- Knives Out

== See also ==
- Lists of films
- Buffoon
- Slapstick comedy
