= Jimmy Conlin =

American actor (1884–1962)

- Conlin in the early 1920s
- Born: James Patrick Conlin; October 14, 1884; Camden, New Jersey, U.S.
- Died: May 7, 1962 (aged 77); Encino, California, U.S.
- Occupation: Actor
- Years active: 1928–1959
- Spouses: Myrtle Glass (m. 1918; died 1945) Dorothy Ryan (m. 1948)

James Patrick Conlin (October 14, 1884 – May 7, 1962) was an American character actor who appeared in almost 150 films in his 32-year career.

== Career ==
Conlin was born in Camden, New Jersey in 1884, and his acting career started in vaudeville. He and singer Myrtle Glass worked up a musical vaudeville act in 1918; they were married later that year. Conlin & Glass played the Keith-Albee-Orpheum circuits in big-city theaters. They also starred together in two short films, Sharps and Flats (1928) and Zip! Boom! Bang! (1929) for Vitaphone.

Conlin made another comedy short without Glass in 1930 (A Tight Squeeze), but his film career started in earnest in 1933, and for the next 27 years, every year saw the release of at least one film in which Conlin appeared. Recognizable by his small size and odd appearance, Conlin played all sorts of small roles and bit parts, many times not receiving an onscreen credit. He typically wore horn-rimmed spectacles, and arranged his hair with shaggy blond bangs that hung over his face. Today's audiences may remember him as the assistant bartender to W. C. Fields in My Little Chickadee, the collections agent in the Fred Astaire musical Second Chorus, the beggar posing as a blind man in Dick Tracy's Dilemma, and the elderly horse trainer in Rolling Home.

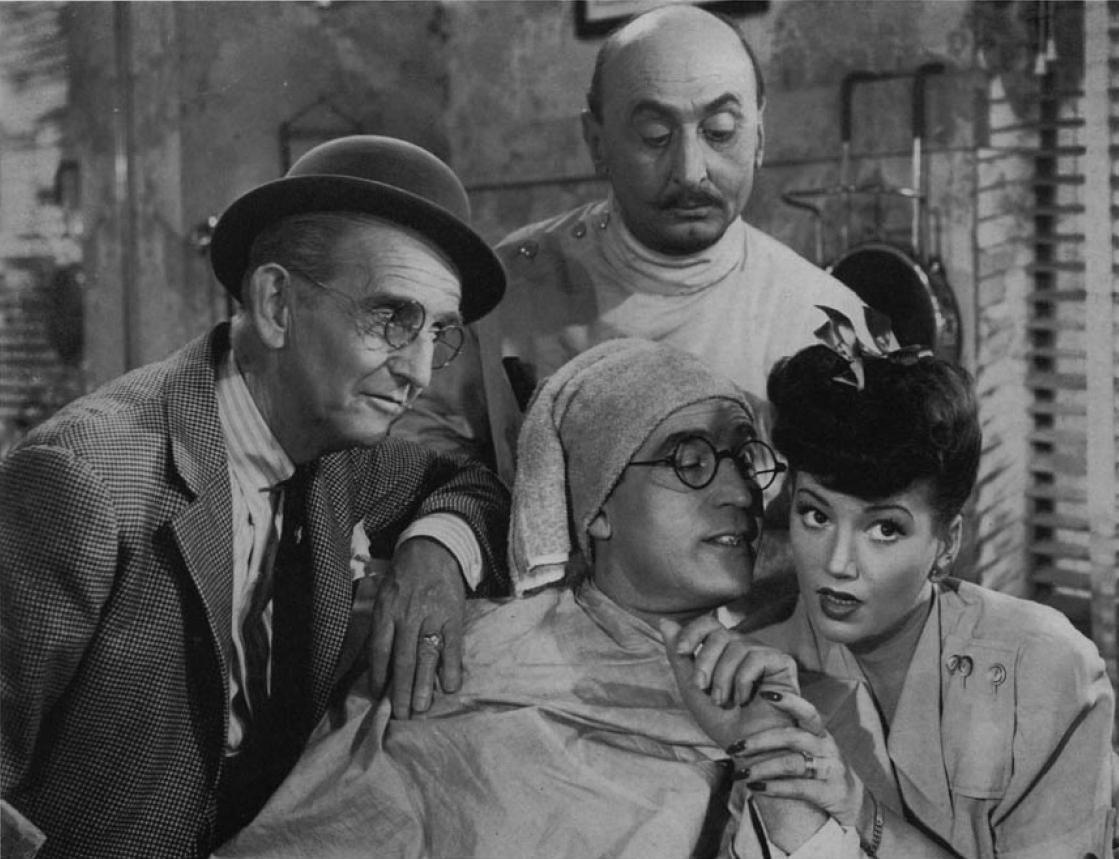
L. to R. : Jimmy Conlin, Harold Lloyd, Torben Meyer, and Arline Judge in The Sin of Harold Diddlebock (1947)

In the 1940s, Conlin was part of Preston Sturges' unofficial "stock company" of character actors, appearing in nine films written and directed by Sturges. His roles in Sturges' films were often sizable and often came with good billing. One of his best performances came in Sturges' The Sin of Harold Diddlebock in 1946, when he played "Wormy", the racetrack tout who persuades Harold Lloyd to have his first drink, setting off the events of the film. The loyalty between Sturges and Conlin ran both ways, and when the former golden boy of Hollywood fell on hard times, Conlin remained a friend, stayed in contact, and helped out in any way he could.

Conlin worked steadily in Hollywood, appearing in 10 to 13 films annually through 1945. He withdrew from films briefly, after his wife of 27 years died in 1945, but he resumed his career in 1946 and was as busy as ever in 1947.

With many major studios cutting back on new productions and discontinuing low-budget "B" pictures, Conlin had fewer opportunities from 1948 forward, but continued to appear in occasional movies into the 1950s. His personal life took a turn for the better; he married the former Dorothy Ryan in 1948.

Conlin did not make many television appearances, but he did have a regular role as a bartender on Duffy's Tavern, a syndicated series from 1954. His last two films were released in 1959: Anatomy of a Murder and The 30 Foot Bride of Candy Rock.

Conlin died at his home in Encino, California on May 7, 1962, at the age of 77. He was survived by his second wife, Dorothy.

== Selected filmography ==
- Sharps and Flats (1928, Short) - Himself
- Grand Slam (1933) - Oscar Smelt (uncredited)
- College Humor (1933) - Dr. Mandel
- The Last Trail (1933) - Jimmy, Train Passenger (uncredited)
- Footlight Parade (1933) - in the
  "Honeymoon Hotel" number (uncredited)
- The Bowery (1933) - Enlistee (uncredited)
- Myrt and Marge (1933) - Comedian in Show (uncredited)
- Advice to the Lovelorn (1933) - California Booster (uncredited)
- Cross Country Cruise (1934) - Sid
- City Limits (1934) - Nap
- She Learned About Sailors (1934) - Irate Neighbor (uncredited)
- 365 Nights in Hollywood (1934) - Heeber, Student Actor (uncredited)
- The Bride Comes Home (1935) - Len Noble
- Rose Marie (1936) - Joe - Piano Player (uncredited)
- And Sudden Death (1936) - Mr. Tweets
- Rose Bowl (1936) - Browning Hills
- The Accusing Finger (1936) - Bill Poster (uncredited)
- Arizona Mahoney (1936) - Man in Hay Bill Gag (uncredited)
- Find the Witness (1937) - Swifty Mullins (uncredited)
- The Man Who Found Himself (1937) - Nosey Watson
- Captains Courageous (1937) - Martin (uncredited)
- Mountain Music (1937) - Medicine Show Shill (uncredited)
- Living on Love (1937) - Man with Monkey (uncredited)
- The Adventurous Blonde (1937) - Dr. Bolger
- Mannequin (1937) - Elevator Operator (uncredited)
- Crashing Hollywood (1938) - Crisby
- Blondes at Work (1938) - Coroner (uncredited)
- The Big Broadcast of 1938 (1938) - 1st Reporter (uncredited)
- He Couldn't Say No (1938) - Ambulance Driver (uncredited)
- Over the Wall (1938) - Davis' Handler (uncredited)
- Torchy Blane in Panama (1938) - Botkin
- Cocoanut Grove (1938) - Motel Proprietor (uncredited)
- Prison Farm (1938) - Dave, the Grocer (uncredited)
- Smashing the Rackets (1938) - Witness (uncredited)
- Broadway Musketeers (1938) - Mr. Hobart Skinner
- Hard to Get (1938) - Dour Diner (uncredited)
- The Shining Hour (1938) - Man Shaving on Plane (uncredited)
- Comet Over Broadway (1938) - Burlesque Comic (uncredited)
- Sweethearts (1938) - Properties Man (uncredited)
- Idiot's Delight (1939) - Stagehand (uncredited)
- Nancy Drew... Reporter (1939) - Newspaper Morgue-Keeper (uncredited)
- Torchy Runs for Mayor (1939) - Coroner (uncredited)
- No Place to Go (1939) - Rivers
- $1000 a Touchdown (1939) - Sheriff (uncredited)
- The Amazing Mr. Williams (1939) - Master of Ceremonies (uncredited)
- Calling Philo Vance (1940) - Dr. Doremus - Coroner
- My Little Chickadee (1940) - Squawk Mulligan - Bartender (uncredited)
- Honeymoon Deferred (1940) - Detective (uncredited)
- Three Cheers for the Irish (1940) - Riley - Party Guest (uncredited)
- King of the Lumberjacks (1940) - Jimmy, the Piano Player (uncredited)
- Two Girls on Broadway (1940) - Poem Vendor (uncredited)
- Edison, the Man (1940) - Waiter (uncredited)
- The Way of All Flesh (1940) - Second Hobo (uncredited)
- Florian (1940) - Stock Guard (uncredited)
- Wagons Westward (1940) - Jake - Storekeeper (uncredited)
- The Great McGinty (1940) - The Lookout - At Felgman's
- Charlie Chan at the Wax Museum (1940) - Barker (uncredited)
- Angels Over Broadway (1940) - Pawn Shop Proprietor (uncredited)
- So You Won't Talk (1940) - Stagehand (uncredited)
- Christmas in July (1940) - Arbuster (uncredited)
- Friendly Neighbors (1940) - Storekeeper (uncredited)
- Second Chorus (1940) - Mr. Dunn
- Let's Make Music (1941) - Jim, the Pianist (uncredited)
- Ridin' on a Rainbow (1941) - Joe
- The Lady Eve (1941) - Second Ship's Waiter (uncredited)
- Footlight Fever (1941) - First Furniture Mover (uncredited)
- A Shot in the Dark (1941) - Hotel Desk Clerk (uncredited)
- Hurry, Charlie, Hurry (1941) - Murphy, the Handyman (uncredited)
- Out of the Fog (1941) - Card Game Kibitzer (uncredited)
- Unexpected Uncle (1941) - Muriel's Husband (uncredited)
- Man at Large (1941) - Stuttering Tenant (uncredited)
- The Gay Falcon (1941) - Bartender at Party (uncredited)
- New York Town (1941) - Burt the Newsman (uncredited)
- Look Who's Laughing (1941) - Brush Salesman (uncredited)
- Sullivan's Travels (1941) - Trustee
- Call Out the Marines (1942) - Little Man (uncredited)
- Obliging Young Lady (1942) - Mr. McIntyre - Linda's Neighbor (uncredited)
- Woman of the Year (1942) - Reporter at Bar (uncredited)
- The Lady Is Willing (1942) - Bum (uncredited)
- The Remarkable Andrew (1942) - Private Henry Bartholomew Smith
- Broadway (1942) - Newsman (uncredited)
- Private Buckaroo (1942) - Uncle (uncredited)
- Are Husbands Necessary? (1942) - Mover (uncredited)
- The Palm Beach Story (1942) - Mr. Asweld
- The Man in the Trunk (1942) - Debt Collector (uncredited)
- The Forest Rangers (1942) - Otto Hanson
- Madame Spy (1942) - Winston
- Ice-Capades Revue (1942) - Biddle (uncredited)
- Calaboose (1943) - Charlie the Drunk (uncredited)
- Slightly Dangerous (1943) - Bartender at Opera (uncredited)
- Taxi, Mister (1943) - Cassidy, Disgruntled ex-Ballplayer
- Jitterbugs (1943) - Barker for Bearded Lady (uncredited)
- Hitler's Madman (1943) - Dvorak - the Shopkeeper
- Dixie (1943) - Publisher (uncredited)
- Petticoat Larceny (1943) - Jitters
- This is the Army (1943) - Stage Doorman (uncredited)
- Swing Shift Maisie (1943) - Man at Meeting (uncredited)
- Old Acquaintance (1943) - Frank - Photographer (uncredited)
- The Miracle of Morgan's Creek (1943) - Mayor (uncredited)
- Ali Baba and the Forty Thieves (1944) - Little Thief
- It Happened Tomorrow (1944) - Man at Boardinghouse (uncredited)
- And the Angels Sing (1944) - Messenger (uncredited)
- Gambler's Choice (1944) - Nicky (uncredited)
- Man from Frisco (1944) - Mayor's Secretary (uncredited)
- Hail the Conquering Hero (1944) - Judge Dennis
- Summer Storm (1944) - Man Mailing Letter (uncredited)
- The Great Moment (1944) - Mr. Burnett, Pharmacist (uncredited)
- Lost in a Harem (1944) - Arab Follower (uncredited)
- Army Wives (1944) - Stan
- The Town Went Wild (1944) - Lemuel Jones, Justice of the Peace
- Bring on the Girls (1945) - Justice of the Peace (uncredited)
- The Picture of Dorian Gray (1945) - Pub Pianist (uncredited)
- It's a Pleasure (1945) - Messenger (uncredited)
- G.I. Honeymoon (1945) - Telegram Messenger (uncredited)
- Honeymoon Ahead (1945) - Grant (uncredited)
- Don Juan Quilligan (1945) - Marriage Bureau Clerk (uncredited)
- Penthouse Rhythm (1945) - Justice of the Peace (uncredited)
- Fallen Angel (1945) - Walton Hotel Clerk (uncredited)
- An Angel Comes to Brooklyn (1945) - Cornelius Terwilliger
- Whistle Stop (1946) - Al - the Barber
- Two Sisters from Boston (1946) - Grandpa Chandler (uncredited)
- Blue Skies (1946) - Jeffrey - Valet (uncredited)
- Rolling Home (1946) - Grandpa Crawford
- Cross My Heart (1946) - Jury Foreman (uncredited)
- It's a Joke, Son! (1947) - Senator Alexander P. Leeds
- The Sin of Harold Diddlebock (1947) - Wormy
- Dick Tracy's Dilemma (1947) - Sightless
- Seven Keys to Baldpate (1947) - Pete the Hermit
- The Trouble with Women (1947) - Mr. Pooler (uncredited)
- The Hucksters (1947) - Blake - Blue Penguin Inn Proprietor
- Mourning Becomes Electra (1947) - Abner Small
- Smart Woman (1948) - Miller (uncredited)
- Hazard (1948) - Mr. Tilson
- Knock on Any Door (1949) - Kid Fingers (uncredited)
- Tulsa (1949) - Homer Triplette
- Prejudice (1949) - Young Joe
- The Inspector General (1949) - Turnkey (uncredited)
- The Great Rupert (1950) - Joe Mahoney
- Operation Haylift (1950) - Ed North
- Sideshow (1950) - Johnny
- On Dangerous Ground (1951) - Doc Hyman (uncredited)
- The Jazz Singer (1952) - Mr. Demming, Photographer (uncredited)
- It Happens Every Thursday (1953) - Matthew
- The Seven Little Foys (1954) - Stage Doorman in 1898 Chicago (uncredited)
- Anatomy of a Murder (1959) - Clarence Madigan
- The 30 Foot Bride of Candy Rock (1959) - Magruder
