= Frank Shannon =

Irish–American actor (1874–1959)

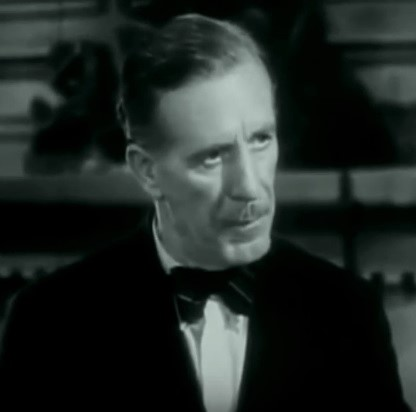
- Shannon in Black Gold (1936)
- Born: Frank Connolly Shannon; 27 July 1874; Ireland
- Died: 1 February 1959 (aged 84); Hollywood, Los Angeles, California, U.S.
- Resting place: Holy Cross Cemetery, Culver City, California
- Other name: Francis Shannon
- Occupations: Actor; writer
- Years active: 1912–1949

Francis Connolly Shannon (27 July 1874 – 1 February 1959) was an Irish actor and writer.

== Career ==
A stage actor and silent film pioneer, Shannon made his screen debut in 1913's The Artist's Joke. He later appeared in dozens of films through the mid-1920s, including The Prisoner of Zenda (1913) and Monsieur Beaucaire (1924). Shannon then returned to the stage until beckoned back to Hollywood in 1931 and played a few substantial supporting parts, including Captain McTavish in Warner Bros.' Torchy Blaine series from 1937 to 1939, but he is most fondly remembered as the brilliant scientist Dr. Alexis Zarkov in the three Flash Gordon serials starring Buster Crabbe between 1936 and 1940. He worked afterwards as a writer for the TV-series Tales of the Texas Rangers between 1955 and 1958.

== Death ==
Shannon died in Hollywood, Los Angeles, California, at the age of 84. He is interred at Holy Cross Cemetery, Culver City, California.

== Partial filmography ==
- The Prisoner of Zenda (1913)
- Perjury (1921) - Phil Rourke
- Boomerang Bill (1922) - Terrence O'Malley
- The Bride's Play (1922) - Sir John Mansfield
- Icebound (1924) - Judge Bradford
- Monsieur Beaucaire (1924) - Badger
- Rasputin and the Empress (1932) - Staff General (uncredited)
- Woman in the Dark (1934) - Prison Warden
- G Men (1935) - Police Chief at Lodge (uncredited)
- Men Without Names (1935) - Leahy
- The Eagle's Brood (1935) - Henchman Mike
- The Pace That Kills (1935) - Mr. Farley
- The Murder of Dr. Harrigan (1936) - Police Sergeant (uncredited)
- Black Gold (1936) - Dan O'Reilly
- The Prisoner of Shark Island (1936) - Judge Advocate General Joseph Holt
- Road Gang (1936) - Chaplain (uncredited)
- Flash Gordon (1936, Serial) - Dr. Alexis Zarkov
- Anthony Adverse (1936) - Major Domo (uncredited)
- The Texas Rangers (1936) - Captain Stafford
- End of the Trail (1936) - Sheriff Anderson
- Nancy Steele Is Missing! (1937) - 1917 Warden (uncredited)
- Affairs of Cappy Ricks (1937) - Captain Braddock
- This Is My Affair (1937) - Root (uncredited)
- Ever Since Eve (1937) - Desk Sergeant (uncredited)
- High, Wide and Handsome (1937) - Peter's Man (uncredited)
- Sophie Lang Goes West (1937) - Detective
- Roll Along, Cowboy (1937) - Fred Morgan (uncredited)
- The Adventurous Blonde (1937) - Cap. McTavish
- Outlaws of the Prairie (1937) - Dart Collins Sr. (uncredited)
- Mannequin (1937) - Police Sergeant at Jail (uncredited)
- Blondes at Work (1938) - Cap. McTavish
- Flash Gordon's Trip to Mars (1938, Serial) - Dr. Alexis Zarkov
- Over the Wall (1938) - Duke Slattery - Policeman with Warrant (uncredited)
- Accidents Will Happen (1938) - Man on Crutches (uncredited)
- Torchy Blane in Panama (1938) - Cap. McTavish
- Holiday (1938) - Farmer (scenes deleted)
- You Can't Take It with You (1938) - Mac (uncredited)
- Torchy Gets Her Man (1938) - Cap. McTavish (uncredited)
- Next Time I Marry (1938) - Police Lieutenant (uncredited)
- Torchy Blane in Chinatown (1939) - Cap. McTavish
- Union Pacific (1939) - Old Man (uncredited)
- Torchy Runs for Mayor (1939) - Cap. McTavish
- Torchy Blane... Playing with Dynamite (1939) - Inspector McTavish
- Rulers of the Sea (1939) - Kelsey (uncredited)
- The Night of Nights (1939) - Frank, the Bartender (uncredited)
- Emergency Squad (1940) - Construction Supervisor at Elevator (uncredited)
- Flash Gordon Conquers the Universe (1940, Serial) - Dr. Alexis Zarkov
- The Return of Frank James (1940) - Sheriff
- Wildcat Bus (1940) - Sweeney
- Brigham Young (1940) - Second Man with California Gold News (uncredited)
- A Dispatch from Reuters (1940) - Mr. O'Malley - Captain of the Nova Scotian (uncredited)
- Dancing on a Dime (1940) - Policeman (uncredited)
- Rage in Heaven (1941) - Workers' Delegate (uncredited)
- Federal Fugitives (1941) - Col. Hammond
- Rawhide Rangers (1941) - Ranger Captain McDowell
- Unfinished Business (1941) - Groom's Father (uncredited)
- Reap the Wild Wind (1942) - Captain in Café (uncredited)
- Ten Gentlemen from West Point (1942) - Senator (uncredited)
- The Secret Code (1942, Serial) - Police Commissioner [Ch.1]
- Batman (1943, Serial) - Dr. Hayden (uncredited)
- The Iron Major (1943) - Pa Cavanaugh (uncredited)
- The Phantom (1943, Serial) - Prof. Davidson (uncredited)
- The Desert Hawk (1944, Serial) - (uncredited)
- Man Alive (1945) - Show Boat Character (uncredited)
- Crack-Up (1946) - Train Station Gateman (uncredited)
- A Dangerous Profession (1949) - Barman (uncredited) (final film role)
