= Torchy Blane =

Female reporter in 1937–39 film series

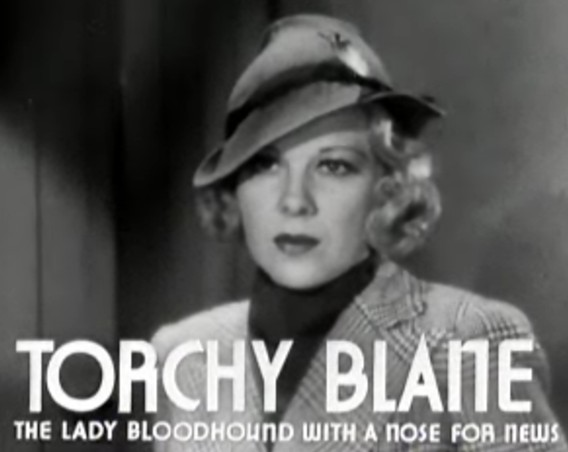
Glenda Farrell as Torchy Blane in Smart Blonde (1937)

Torchy Blane is a fictional female reporter, the main character of nine films produced by Warner Bros. Pictures between 1937 and 1939. The Torchy Blane series, which blend mystery, action, adventure and comedy, were popular second features.

== Character ==
During the pre-World War II period, the role of newspaper reporter was one of the few in American cinema that portrayed women as intelligent, competent, self-reliant, and career-oriented—virtually equal to men. Among these screen characters, Torchy Blane, a wisecracking female reporter with an instinct for a scoop, was perhaps the best known. The movies were lighthearted cops-and-robbers films. A typical plot had the daring, fast-talking Torchy unraveling a mystery by staying several steps ahead of her boyfriend, gruff police detective Steve McBride. Torchy's given name is Theresa, used only twice over the course of nine movies, once when boarding an airplane in Fly-Away Baby and again when being given a parking ticket in Blondes at Work. Curiously, In Torchy Blane.. Playing with Dynamite, her name is given as Helen.

== Production ==
Glenda Farrell and Barton MacLane as Torchy Blane and Steve McBride

In 1936, Warner Bros. Pictures began to develop an adaptation of the MacBride and Kennedy stories by detective novelist Frederick Nebel. These stories featured a no-nonsense cop named MacBride and his friend known as Kennedy, a hard-drinking newspaperman. For the film version, Kennedy was changed to a woman named Theresa "Torchy" Blane and became the love interest of the cop, whose name was now spelled "McBride". Torchy's lifestyle was more compatible with the Hays Code than a faithful on-screen adaptation of Kennedy would have been.

The first film was based on Nebel's MacBride and Kennedy story "No Hard Feelings". (The story was later adapted again as the 1941 film A Shot in the Dark, which was not a Torchy Blane film.) Director Frank MacDonald immediately knew whom he wanted for the role of Torchy Blane. Glenda Farrell had already played hard-boiled reporters in earlier Warner Bros. films, Mystery of the Wax Museum (1933) and Hi, Nellie! (1934), she was quickly cast in the first Torchy Blane movie, Smart Blonde, with Barton MacLane playing detective Steve McBride. Farrell and MacLane would co-star in seven of the nine Torchy Blane films by Warner Bros. Smart Blonde was released on January 2, 1937, the film was a surprise hit, and Warner Bros. made eight more movies from 1937 to 1939.

In the fifth film, Torchy Blane in Panama (1938), Warner Bros. replaced Farrell and MacLane with Lola Lane and Paul Kelly. Negative fan reaction led Warner Bros. to recast Farrell and MacLane in the lead roles. They starred in three more Torchy Blane films.

The Torchy Blane unit was unusually close-knit, with many of the actors in recurring roles. Tom Kennedy appeared in all nine Torchy Blane features as Gahagan, McBride's slow-witted cop sidekick given to bursts of poetry. Character actor George Guhl made notable appearances in all but the last entry in the series as forgetful desk sergeant Graves. Joe Cunningham appeared in seven installments as Maxie, Torchy's beleaguered city editor; in the other two films, Raymond Hatton was Maxie. Frank Shannon also appeared in seven as Capt. McTavish, McBride's superior officer. Character players Harry Seymour (who doubled as dialogue coach) and Jack Wise were in seven films each. Character comedian Jimmy Conlin appeared three times as the police coroner. Composer Howard Jackson was credited with scoring all nine films.

In 1939, Glenda Farrell left Warner Bros., and the studio recast the leading roles with Jane Wyman (who had played hatcheck girl Dixie in the first Torchy film) and Allen Jenkins for the series' final entry, Torchy Blane... Playing with Dynamite (1939). In a review headlined "Failing Material Stymies Whole Cast", the Hollywood Reporter graded the film as routine, and noted, "It is impossible to believe that a pretty and smart young girl like Jane Wyman could possibly be in love with a broken down detective who looks like Jenkins." Warners had already announced that this would be the final Torchy Blane picture; a leftover Torchy Blane script was adapted into the 1939 film Private Detective, also starring Jane Wyman, but not as the Torchy character.

== Portrayals ==
In seven of the nine films featuring the character, Torchy Blane was played by Glenda Farrell. In her role as Torchy, Farrell was promoted as being able to speak 400 words in 40 seconds. On her portrayal of the character, Farrell said in her 1969 Time interview: "So before I undertook to do the first Torchy, I determined to create a real human being—and not an exaggerated comedy type. I met those [newswomen] who visited Hollywood and watched them work on visits to New York City. They were generally young, intelligent, refined and attractive. By making Torchy true to life, I tried to create a character practically unique in movies."

== Influence ==
Comic book writer and Superman co-creator Jerry Siegel credited Glenda Farrell's portrayal of Torchy Blane as the inspiration for the DC Comics reporter Lois Lane and the name of actress Lola Lane for Lois' name. Joanne Siegel, the wife of Jerry Siegel and the original model for Lois Lane, also cited Farrell's portrayal of Torchy as Siegel's inspiration for Lois.

== Films and cast ==
Released	Film title	Run time
1937	Smart Blonde	59 min
1937	Fly-Away Baby	60 min
1937	The Adventurous Blonde	61 min
1938	Blondes at Work	63 min
1938	Torchy Blane in Panama	59 min
1938	Torchy Gets Her Man	63 min
1939	Torchy Blane in Chinatown	58 min
1939	Torchy Runs for Mayor	60 min
1939	Torchy Blane... Playing with Dynamite	59 min

Character	Title								
Character	Smart Blonde	Fly-Away Baby	The Adventurous Blonde	Blondes at Work	Torchy Blane in Panama	Torchy Gets Her Man	Torchy Blane in Chinatown	Torchy Runs for Mayor	Torchy Blane Playing With Dynamite
Torchy Blane	Glenda Farrell	Glenda Farrell	Glenda Farrell	Glenda Farrell	Lola Lane	Glenda Farrell	Glenda Farrell	Glenda Farrell	Jane Wyman
Steve McBride	Barton MacLane	Barton MacLane	Barton MacLane	Barton MacLane	Paul Kelly	Barton MacLane	Barton MacLane	Barton MacLane	Allen Jenkins
Gahagan	Tom Kennedy	Tom Kennedy	Tom Kennedy	Tom Kennedy	Tom Kennedy	Tom Kennedy	Tom Kennedy	Tom Kennedy	Tom Kennedy
Sgt. Graves/O'Toole	George Guhl	George Guhl	George Guhl	George Guhl	George Guhl	George Guhl	George Guhl	George Guhl	John Sheehan
Maxie	Joe Cunningham	Raymond Hatton	Raymond Hatton	Joe Cunningham	Joe Cunningham	Joe Cunningham	Joe Cunningham	Joe Cunningham	Joe Cunningham
Captain McTavish			Frank Shannon	Frank Shannon	Frank Shannon	Frank Shannon	Frank Shannon	Frank Shannon	Frank Shannon
Dr. Bolger, the coroner			Jimmy Conlin	Jimmy Conlin				Jimmy Conlin	

== Home media ==
Warner Archive released a boxed set DVD collection featuring all nine Torchy Blane films on March 29, 2010.
