= Tom Kennedy (actor) =

American actor (1885–1965)

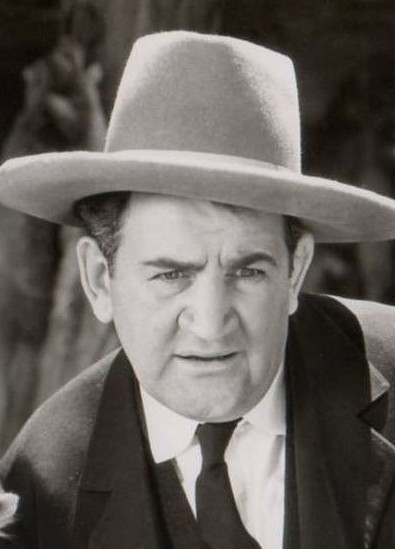
- Kennedy in Henry Hathaway's Man of the Forest (1933)
- Born: Thomas Aloyisus Kennedy; July 15, 1885; New York City, U.S.
- Died: October 6, 1965 (aged 80); Los Angeles, California, U.S.
- Resting place: Hollywood Forever Cemetery
- Other name: Tommy Kennedy
- Occupation: Actor
- Years active: 1915–1965
- Spouse: Frances Katherine Marshall (m. 1922)
- Children: 4; including Don Kennedy

Thomas Aloyisus Kennedy (July 15, 1885 – October 6, 1965) was an American actor known for his roles in Hollywood comedies from the silent days, with such producers as Mack Sennett and Hal Roach, mainly supporting lead comedians such as the Marx Brothers, W. C. Fields, Mabel Normand, Shemp Howard, El Brendel, Laurel and Hardy, and the Three Stooges. Kennedy also played dramatic roles as a supporting actor. Today's viewers may know him from Warner Bros.' nine Torchy Blane features as Gahagan, the poetry-spouting cop whose running line was, "What a day! What a day!"

== Career ==
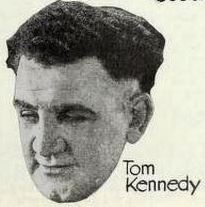
Kennedy in an ad for The Flirt (1922)

For over 50 years, from 1915 to 1965, he appeared in over 320 films and television series, often uncredited. His first film was a short comedy western called The Lamb. He continued making films right up until his death, his last film being a western titled The Bounty Killer (1965).

Tom Kennedy has been erroneously listed in several film sources as the brother of slow-burning comedian Edgar Kennedy. Though the two men were not related, they were apparently good friends, with Tom appearing in many of Edgar's domestic two-reel comedy shorts.

Tom Kennedy was a favorite of Columbia Pictures short-subject producer Jules White. White teamed Kennedy with another one of White's favorites, Monte Collins, for a starring series that ran from 1935 to 1938. Kennedy was always the big oaf, the dumb but good-natured hulk trying to be helpful. After the Collins & Kennedy series ran its course, White teamed Tom Kennedy with Columbia comics Johnny Arthur, Andy Clyde, El Brendel, and Shemp Howard. Kennedy was still working in Columbia shorts as late as 1953, taking slapstick punishment and pies in the face at the age of 68.

His television appearances included episodes of Perry Mason, Maverick, My Favorite Martian and Gunsmoke.

== Personal life ==
Kennedy married Frances Katherine Marshall in 1922. They had four children.

== Death ==
Kennedy died of bone cancer on October 6, 1965. He was buried at the Hollywood Forever Cemetery in Hollywood, California.

== Selected filmography ==
- The Lamb (1915) as White Hopeless (uncredited)
- Double Trouble (1915) as Judge Blodgett
- His Bitter Pill (1916) as A Henchman
- Are Waitresses Safe? (1917)
- Mickey (1918) as Tom Rawlings
- Yankee Doodle in Berlin (1919) as American General (uncredited)
- The Island of Intrigue (1919) as Jackson - The Butler
- The Poor Simp (1920) as Jim Donnelly
- Kismet (1920) as Kutayt
- Skirts (1921)
- Serenade (1921) as Zambrano
- Kindred of the Dust (1922) as Big tough (uncredited)
- Our Leading Citizen (1922) as Boots
- If You Believe It, It's So (1922) as Bartender
- Afraid to Fight (1922) as Battling Grogan
- The Flaming Hour (1922) as Ben
- The Flirt (1922) as Sam Fenton
- With Naked Fists (1923)
- Scaramouche (1923) as A Dragoon (uncredited)
- Madonna of the Streets (1924)
- As Man Desires (1925) as Gorilla Bagsley
- The Fearless Lover (1925) as Tom Dugan
- High and Handsome (1925) as Bat Kennedy
- The Best Bad Man (1925) as Dan Ellis
- The Yankee Señor (1926) as Luke Martin
- Behind the Front (1926) as Sergeant
- Sir Lumberjack (1926) as Bill Blake
- Born to the West (1926) as Dinkey Hooley
- Mantrap (1926) as Curly Evans
- The Better 'Ole (1926) as The Blacksmith (uncredited)
- We're in the Navy Now (1926) as Sailor Percival Scruggs
- Man of the Forest (1926) as Sheriff
- The Mysterious Rider (1927) as Lem Spooner
- Señorita (1927) as Oliveros Gaucho (uncredited)
- Alias the Deacon (1927) as 'Bull' Moran
- Fireman, Save My Child (1927) as Capt. Kennedy
- One-Round Hogan (1927) (uncredited)
- Silver Valley (1927) as 'Hayfever' Hawkins
- Ham and Eggs at the Front (1927) as Lazarus
- Wife Savers (1928) as General Lavoris
- Tillie's Punctured Romance (1928) as Property Man
- Hold 'Em Yale (1928) as Detective
- None but the Brave (1928) as Noah
- The Cop (1928) as Sergeant Coughlin
- Marked Money (1928) as Bill Clemons
- Love Over Night (1928) as Detective
- The Cohens and Kellys in Atlantic City (1929) as Crook
- Glad Rag Doll (1929) as Manager
- Big News (1929) as Officer Ryan
- Happy Days (1929) as Doorman (uncredited)
- The Shannons of Broadway (1929) as Burt
- The Big House (1930) as Uncle Jed (scenes deleted)
- The Fall Guy (1930) as Detective Burke
- See America Thirst (1930) as 'Shivering' Smith
- The Gang Buster (1931) as 'Gopher' Brant
- Sit Tight (1931) as Mr. Mack (uncredited)
- It Pays to Advertise (1931) as Perkins
- Iron Man (1931) as Bartender (uncredited)
- El Tenorio del harem (1931) as El sargento
- Young as You Feel (1931) as Colorado Detective (uncredited)
- Caught (1931) as Jard Harmon
- Monkey Business (1931) as Gibson
- New Adventures of Get Rich Quick Wallingford (1931) as Truck Driver (uncredited)
- Flying High (1931) as Jokester with Firecrackers (uncredited)
- Charlie Chan's Chance (1932) as Hawkins, Man in Police Line-Up (uncredited)
- Huddle (1932) as Moving Man (uncredited)
- Lady and Gent (1932) as Small Arena Fighter Spider Webb
- Skyscraper Souls (1932) as Masseur (uncredited)
- Pack Up Your Troubles (1932) as Recruiting Sergeant
- The Crooked Circle (1932) as Mike, the policeman
- Night After Night (1932) as Tom (the bartender)
- Madison Square Garden (1932) as Judge (uncredited)
- If I Had a Million (1932) as Joe - Carnival Bouncer (uncredited)
- Uptown New York (1932) as Wrestling Trainer (uncredited)
- The Devil Is Driving (1932) as Fritz (uncredited)
- Lawyer Man (1932) as Jake - the Ice Man (uncredited)
- She Done Him Wrong (1933) as Big Bill - Bartender (uncredited)
- 42nd Street (1933) as Slim Murphy (uncredited)
- Blondie Johnson (1933) as Hype (uncredited)
- Song of the Eagle (1933) as Officer McGinty (uncredited)
- Cross Fire (1933) as French Bouncer (uncredited)
- Man of the Forest (1933) as Sheriff Blake
- Penthouse (1933) as Joe - Gazotti's Man (uncredited)
- Bombshell (1933) as Minor Role (scenes deleted)
- Day of Reckoning (1933) as Phil - First Piano Mover (uncredited)
- Strictly Dynamite (1934) as Junior
- Hollywood Party (1934) as Beavers (uncredited)
- Down to Their Last Yacht (1934) as Joe 'Uncle Ed' Schultz (uncredited)
- Bright Lights (1935) as Traffic Cop at Theatre (uncredited)
- Old Man Rhythm (1935) as Campus Guard (uncredited)
- She Couldn't Take It (1935) as Slugs (uncredited)
- The Bride Comes Home (1935) as Husky Thug at Party (uncredited)
- The Country Doctor (1936) as Logger (uncredited)
- Poppy (1936) as Hot Dog Stand Proprietor (uncredited)
- The Return of Sophie Lang (1936) as Cop on Switchboard (uncredited)
- Ticket to Paradise (1936) as Cop (uncredited)
- Hollywood Boulevard (1936) as Bouncer at Pago Pago
- Bulldog Edition (1936) as Irate Husband of Contest Loser (uncredited)
- Wives Never Know (1936) as Bartender (uncredited)
- The Big Game (1936) as Fan in Stands (uncredited)
- Smart Blonde (1937) as Gahagan
- Woman-Wise (1937) as Bouncer (uncredited)
- When's Your Birthday? (1937) as Fight Manager (uncredited)
- Behind the Headlines (1937) as Tiny
- There Goes My Girl (1937) (scenes deleted)
- Armored Car (1937) as Tiny
- The Case of the Stuttering Bishop (1937) as Jim Magooney
- Slave Ship (1937) as Bartender (uncredited)
- Married Before Breakfast (1937) as Mr. Baglipp
- Fly-Away Baby (1937) as Gahagan
- She Had to Eat (1937) as Pete
- Marry the Girl (1937) as Jasper
- The Big Shot (1937) as Bugs
- Forty Naughty Girls (1937) as Detective Casey
- Varsity Show (1937) as Policeman (uncredited)
- Living on Love (1937) as Pete Ryan
- The Adventurous Blonde (1937) as Gahagan
- Wise Girl (1937) as Detective
- Crashing Hollywood (1938) as Al
- Swing It, Sailor! (1938) as Policeman
- Blondes at Work (1938) as Gahagan
- Making the Headlines (1938) as Police Sergeant Handley
- He Couldn't Say No (1938) as Dimples, a Gangster
- Torchy Blane in Panama (1938) as Gahagan
- Go Chase Yourself (1938) as Icebox
- Danger on the Air (1938) as Hotel Doorman (uncredited)
- Crime Ring (1938) as Dummy (uncredited)
- Torchy Gets Her Man (1938) as Gahagan
- Long Shot (1939) as Mike Claurens
- Torchy Blane in Chinatown (1939) as Gahagan
- Pardon Our Nerve (1939) as Bodyguard
- Society Lawyer (1939) as Alf
- Torchy Runs for Mayor (1939) as Gahagan
- Grand Jury Secrets (1939) as Clancy (uncredited)
- Torchy Blane... Playing with Dynamite (1939) as Gahagan
- These Glamour Girls (1939) as Joy Lane Manager (uncredited)
- The Day the Bookies Wept (1939) as Pinky Brophy
- The Covered Trailer (1939) as Otto
- Remember the Night (1940) as 'Fat' Mike
- Millionaire Playboy (1940) as Tom Murphy
- Curtain Call (1940) as Massage Attendant
- An Angel from Texas (1940) as Chopper
- Pop Always Pays (1940) as Murphy
- Sporting Blood (1940) as Grantly
- Flowing Gold (1940) as Petunia
- Mexican Spitfire Out West (1940) as Taxi Driver
- Footlight Fever (1941) as Pinky (uncredited)
- The Great Swindle (1941) as Capper Smith
- Thieves Fall Out (1941) as Cab Driver (uncredited)
- Angels with Broken Wings (1941) as Gus
- Sailors on Leave (1941) as Dugan
- The Officer and the Lady (1941) as Bumps O'Neil
- The Mexican Spitfire's Baby (1941) as Sheriff Judson (uncredited)
- Pardon My Stripes (1942) as Casino
- Butch Minds the Baby (1942) as Philly the Weeper
- Broadway (1942) as Kerry (uncredited)
- Blondie's Blessed Event (1942) as Motorcycle Cop Who Names The Baby 'Cookie' (uncredited)
- Wildcat (1942) as Fred (uncredited)
- Mexican Spitfire's Elephant (1942) as Joe the Villa Luigi Bartender (uncredited)
- Dixie Dugan (1943) as Sergeant (uncredited)
- Ladies' Day (1943) as Dugan, the House Detective
- Hit Parade of 1943 (1943) as Westinghouse
- Taxi, Mister (1943) as Detective (uncredited)
- Dixie (1943) as Barkeeper (uncredited)
- Stage Door Canteen (1943) as himself
- Petticoat Larceny (1943) as Pinky
- The Adventures of a Rookie (1943) as Ship Lader (uncredited)
- So's Your Uncle (1943) as Cop
- Is Everybody Happy? (1943) as Desk Sergeant (uncredited)
- Riding High (1943) as Wilson (uncredited)
- Here Comes Elmer (1943) as Johnson
- Campus Rhythm (1943) as Police Sergeant (uncredited)
- True to Life (1943) as Customer (uncredited)
- O, My Darling Clementine (1943) as Bill Collector
- Rosie the Riveter (1944) as Piano Mover
- The Girl in the Case (1944) as Watchman (uncredited)
- And the Angels Sing (1944) as Potatoes
- Once Upon a Time (1944) as Truckman (uncredited)
- Take It Big (1944) as Moving Man (uncredited)
- Moonlight and Cactus (1944) as Lucky
- The Princess and the Pirate (1944) as Alonzo
- The Town Went Wild (1944) as Policeman in Courtroom (uncredited)
- Practically Yours (1944) as Burly Citizen at Newsreel Theatre (uncredited)
- The Man Who Walked Alone (1945) as Officer #1
- Rough, Tough and Ready (1945) as Dan Cowan (uncredited)
- Boston Blackie's Rendezvous (1945) as Doorman (uncredited)
- Voice of the Whistler (1945) as Ferdinand / Hammerlock
- The Spanish Main (1945) as Pirate Captain at Inn in Tortuga (uncredited)
- Man Alive (1945) as Bartender (uncredited)
- A Letter for Evie (1946) as Driver (uncredited)
- The Kid from Brooklyn (1946) as Referee #1 (uncredited)
- Blonde Alibi (1946) as Policeman Clancy (uncredited)
- Bringing Up Father (1946) as Murphy
- The Mighty McGurk (1947) as Bruiser (uncredited)
- The Pretender (1947) as Fingers Murdock
- The Burning Cross (1947) as Police Sergeant
- Magic Town (1947) as Moving Man (uncredited)
- Dangerous Years (1947) as Adamson
- The Judge Steps Out (1948) as Jack, the Court Receptionist (uncredited)
- Devil's Cargo (1948) as Naga
- Jinx Money (1948) as Officer Rooney
- They Live by Night (1948) as Cop (uncredited)
- Joe Palooka in Winner Take All (1948) as Lefty
- Thunder in the Pines (1948) as Josh - Station Master
- Jiggs and Maggie in Court (1948) as Card Player (uncredited)
- The Paleface (1948) as Bartender
- Trouble Preferred (1948) as Night Watchman (uncredited)
- Fighting Fools (1949) as Rosemeyer, Arena Doorman (uncredited)
- The Mutineers (1949) as Butch
- Mighty Joe Young (1949) as Policeman (uncredited)
- Jiggs and Maggie in Jackpot Jitters (1949) as Murphy (uncredited)
- Square Dance Jubilee (1949) as Bartender Tom
- Blonde Dynamite (1950) as Tom, a Policeman (uncredited)
- Riding High (1950) as Racetrack Mug (uncredited)
- Jiggs and Maggie Out West (1950) as Murphy (uncredited)
- Triple Trouble (1950) as Convict (uncredited)
- Border Rangers (1950) as Station Agent
- M (1951) as Hood (uncredited)
- The Scarf (1951) as Asylum Inmate (uncredited)
- Let's Go Navy! (1951) as Officer Donovan
- Havana Rose (1951) as Hotel Detective
- Hold That Line (1952) as Officer Murphy (uncredited)
- Road Agent (1952) as Bartender Johnny (uncredited)
- Gold Fever (1952) as Big Tom
- Invasion U.S.A. (1952) as Tim, Bartender
- Abbott and Costello Meet the Keystone Kops (1955)
- Public Pigeon No. 1 (1957) as Prison Guard (uncredited)
- The Kettles on Old MacDonald's Farm (1957) as Contest Spectator (uncredited)
- Man of a Thousand Faces (1957) as Audience at Eulogy (uncredited)
- Slaughter on Tenth Avenue (1957) as Dock Guard (uncredited)
- Once Upon a Horse... (1958) as Townsman (uncredited)
- Revolt in the Big House (1958) as Convict (uncredited)
- Some Like It Hot (1959) as Bouncer (uncredited)
- Say One for Me (1959) as Wardrobe Delivery Man (uncredited)
- Walk Like a Dragon (1960) as Jethro the Bartender
- It's a Mad, Mad, Mad, Mad World (1963) as Santa Rosita Police Department traffic cop (uncredited)
- The Bounty Killer (1965) as Joe - Waiter
