= Fly-Away Baby =

1937 film by Frank McDonald

- Film poster
- Directed by: Frank McDonald
- Written by: Don Ryan (screenplay); Kenneth Gamet(screenplay) Dorothy Kilgallen (concept, screenplay)
- Screenplay by: Kenneth Gamet; Don Ryan
- Based on: Girl Around the World; 1936 book by Dorothy Kilgallen
- Produced by: Bryan Foy
- Starring: Glenda Farrell; Barton MacLane
- Cinematography: Warren Lynch
- Edited by: Doug Gould
- Music by: Howard Jackson
- Production company: Warner Bros. Pictures, Inc.
- Distributed by: Warner Bros. Pictures, Inc.
- Release date: June 19, 1937
- Running time: 60 minutes
- Country: United States
- Language: English

Fly-Away Baby (a.k.a. Fly Away Baby) is a 1937 American crime-mystery film starring Glenda Farrell as reporter Torchy Blane, along with her detective boyfriend, Steve McBride (Barton MacLane) solving a murder and smuggling case during around-the-world flight. (Note: The screen titles use the slight spelling variation of Fly Away Baby.)

After the success of the first film Smart Blonde (1937), Warner Bros. Pictures quickly produced a second film based on the Torchy Blane / Steve McBride crime-fighting duo, where Torchy once again beat the police and solved the crime all on her own. Released on June 19, 1937, the film is followed by The Adventurous Blonde (1937).

== Plot ==
When jeweler Milton Devereux is murdered and his collection of diamonds is stolen, crime reporter Torchy Blane is assigned to the case. Her police detective boyfriend Steve McBride is investigating the case, but Torchy tags along as he hunts for the murder weapon. She finds a gun hidden in a drainpipe in the alley behind the store. Torchy also learns that Milton had a confrontation with Sonny Croy. Croy is a reporter for the rival Star-Telegram, and the son of the newspaper's owner, constantly in trouble over gambling debts and an outstanding loan.

Sonny becomes a prime suspect, but he has an alibi from the victim's business partner Guy Allister that they were having lunch at the time of the murder. Torchy and Steve question the waiter in the restaurant and find a clue on a menu. They trace Sonny to the apartment of nightclub dancer Ila Sayre who insists that Sonny was on the phone with her at the time of the murder.

Sonny explains the notes on the menu, saying that he is taking an aircraft and Zeppelin flight around the world as a publicity stunt. Torchy decides to follow him and talks her newspaper into sending her around the world in a race with Sonny and another reporter for the Daily Journal, Hughie Sprague.

The journey ahead takes Torchy and her rivals across the Pacific, Asia, and Europe with stops at Honolulu, San Francisco, Hong Kong, and Stuttgart, Germany. When the airship lands in Hawaii, Torchy searches Sonny's room and finds a message indicating that some items will be exchanged in Stuttgart. Sonny discovers her investigation after finding a lipstick Torchy accidentally dropped in his room.

Later, Ila admits that she did not talk to Sonny on the phone. Steve, who has joined Torchy on board the airship, decides to arrest Sonny after Torchy points out that the restaurant's back door is opposite to the back door of the jewelry store. Sonny, however, is found dead himself and it is discovered that the diamonds hidden in the false bottom of his suitcase are not real.

Torchy puts the various clues together and determines that Guy Allister was the real murderer, and Sonny was working for him to pay off his debt. After further investigation, they learn that Allister boarded the airship using a false name. When he tries to parachute out of the airship, he falls to his death when his parachute fails to open.

== Cast ==
- Glenda Farrell as "Torchy" Blane
- Barton MacLane as Steve McBride
- Gordon Oliver as Lucien "Sonny" Croy
- Hugh O'Connell as Hughie Sprague
- Marcia Ralston as Ila Sayre
- Tom Kennedy as Gahagan
- Joe King as Mr. Guy Allister

== Production ==
According to contemporary sources, Dorothy Kilgallen's idea for Fly-Away Baby was based on her own real-life participation in a race around the world by air with two male reporters. The race was featured in her book, Girl Around the World.

Fly-Away Baby was shot in part at the Grand Central Air Terminal, Glendale, California with the participation of American Airlines. The aircraft seen in the film include the America Airlines Douglas DST-144 and Douglas DC-2 and Pan Am Martin 130 "China Clipper".

Although mainly seen in stock footage from newsreels, the German passenger airship LZ 129 Hindenburg departs its hangar in Friedrichshafen, and is later seen in the sky over New York City. Other scenes of an airship are actually the American dirigible USS Akron or Macon above the orchards of California. Interior sets depicting staterooms, lounge and corridors of the Hindenburg were accurate studio mockups,

== Reception ==
The Film Daily described the film as a "light little trifle … made for the summer season and not to be taken seriously", although it could be "good ... as the second on a dual bill, and won't cause any excitement anywhere." It concluded that "It is all very loosely written and acted, for that matter."

Aviation film historian James M. Farmer in Celluloid Wings: The Impact of Movies on Aviation (1984), noted that despite a meager budget for Fly-Away Baby, the film (featured) "Modest production values."

== Home media ==
Warner Archive released a boxed set DVD collection featuring all nine Torchy Blane films on March 29, 2011.
