= Man of the Forest (1933 film) =

1933 film by Henry Hathaway

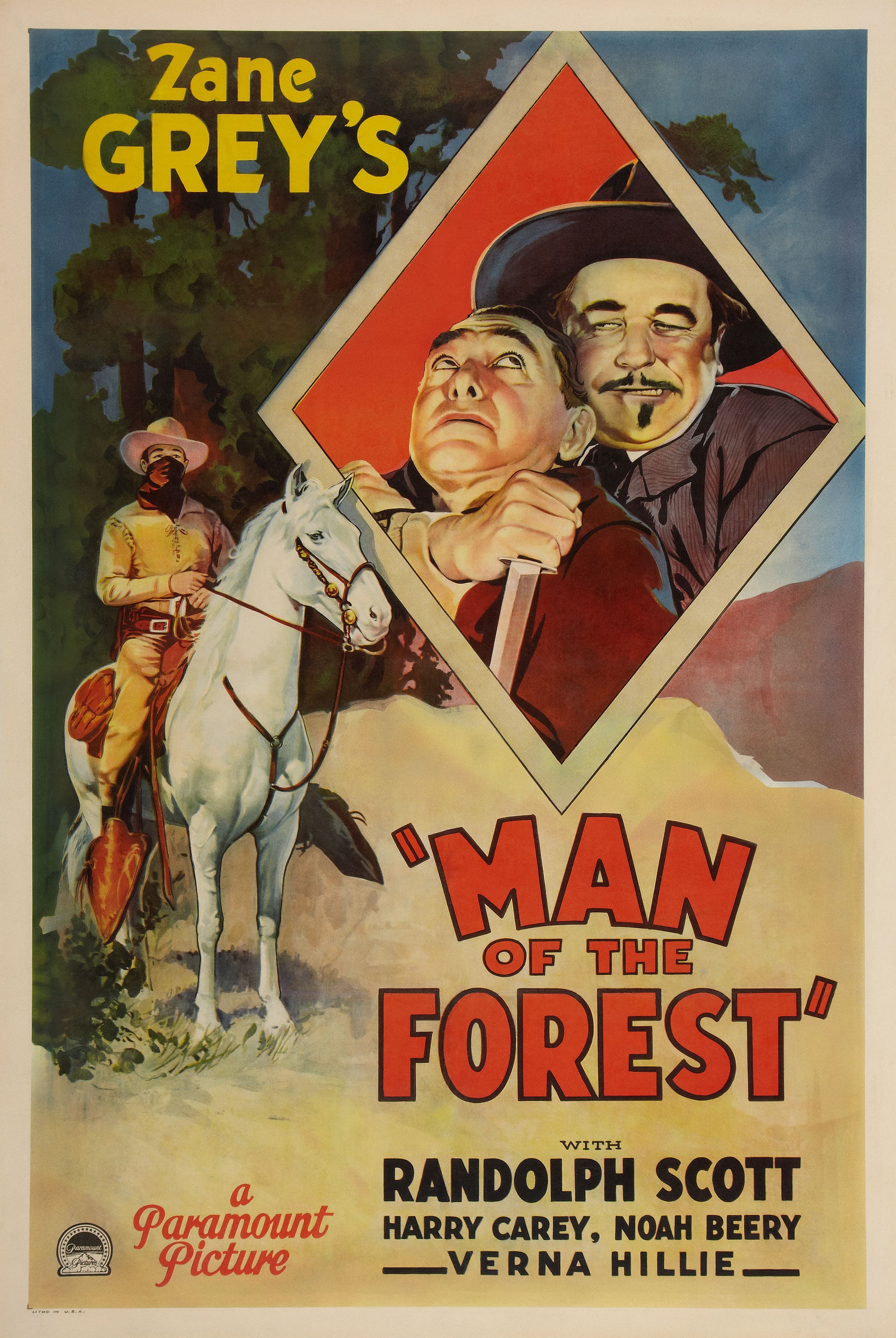
- Theatrical poster with Carey and Beery
- Directed by: Henry Hathaway
- Written by: Jack Cunningham (writer); Zane Grey (novel); Harold Shumate (writer)
- Produced by: Harold Hurley (producer)
- Starring: Randolph Scott; Verna Hillie; Harry Carey; Noah Beery Sr. Buster Crabbe
- Cinematography: Ben F. Reynolds
- Edited by: Jack Dung
- Distributed by: Paramount Pictures
- Release date: August 25, 1933
- Running time: 62 minutes
- Country: United States
- Language: English

Man of the Forest is a 1933 American pre-Code Western film directed by Henry Hathaway, based upon a novel by Zane Grey, released by Paramount Pictures, and starring Randolph Scott and Verna Hillie. The supporting cast features Harry Carey, Noah Beery Sr., Barton MacLane, Buster Crabbe and Guinn "Big Boy" Williams. The film is also known as Challenge of the Frontier (American reissue title).

Hathaway directed much of the same cast (Scott, Beery, Carey and Crabbe) that same year in another Zane Grey story, The Thundering Herd, and also Scott, Beery and Crabbe in To the Last Man, yet another Zane Grey story that year.

== Plot ==
A young lady is captured by a band of outlaws led by Clint Beasley. Brett Dale figures out their plan and rescues her.

== Cast ==
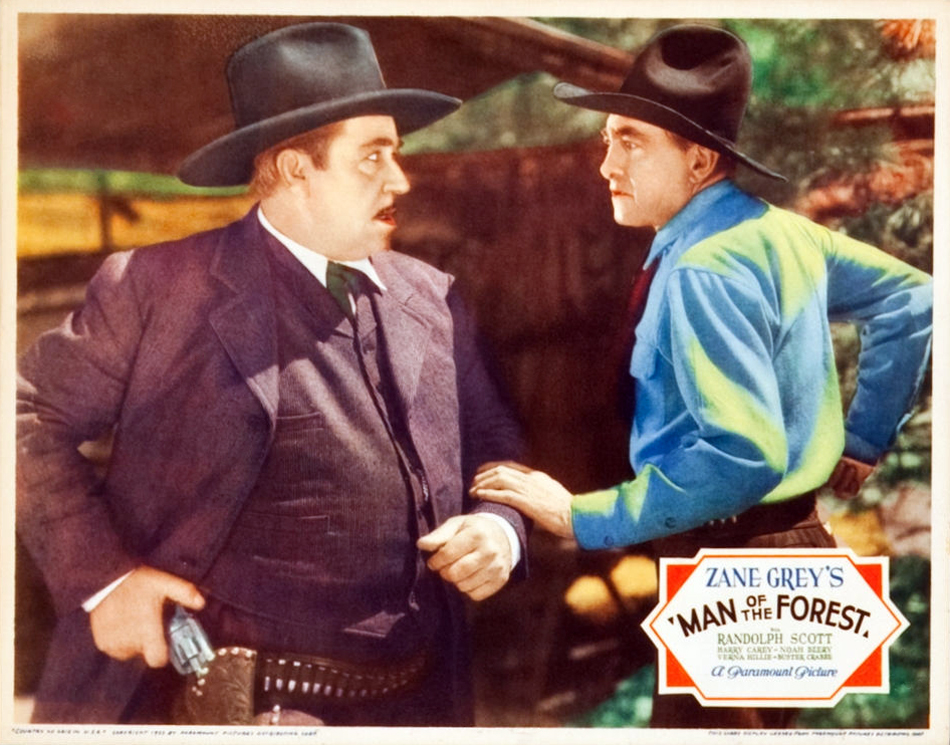
Noah Beery Sr. battles Harry Carey in Man of the Forest

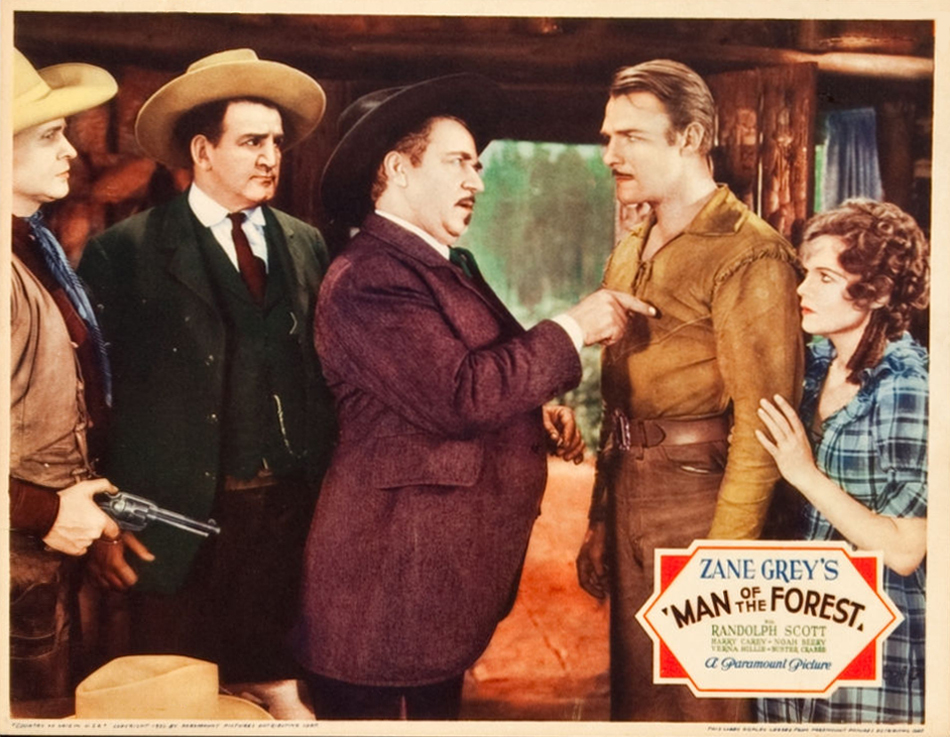
Barton MacLane, Tom Kennedy, Noah Beery Sr., Randolph Scott and Verna Hillie in Henry Hathaway's Man of the Forest (1933)

- Randolph Scott as Brett Dale
- Verna Hillie as Alice Gaynor
- Harry Carey as Jim Gaynor
- Noah Beery Sr. as Clint Beasley
- Barton MacLane as Mulvey
- Buster Crabbe as Yegg
- Guinn "Big Boy" Williams as Big Casino
- Vince Barnett as Little Casino
- Blanche Friderici as Mrs. Peg Forney
- Tempe Pigott as Madame
- Tom Kennedy as Sheriff Blake

== Restoration ==
A 35mm print of the film exists and was exhibited at the Museum of Modern Art in New York City in 2015.

== 1926 version ==
This film is a remake of a 1926 version of the same name starring Jack Holt in the role subsequently portrayed by Randolph Scott. Scott's hair was darkened and he wore a moustache in order to more closely match stock footage of Holt playing the part. Warner Oland played Noah Beery's role of Clint Beasley in the earlier film.
