= Thomas Jackson (actor) =

American actor (1886–1967)

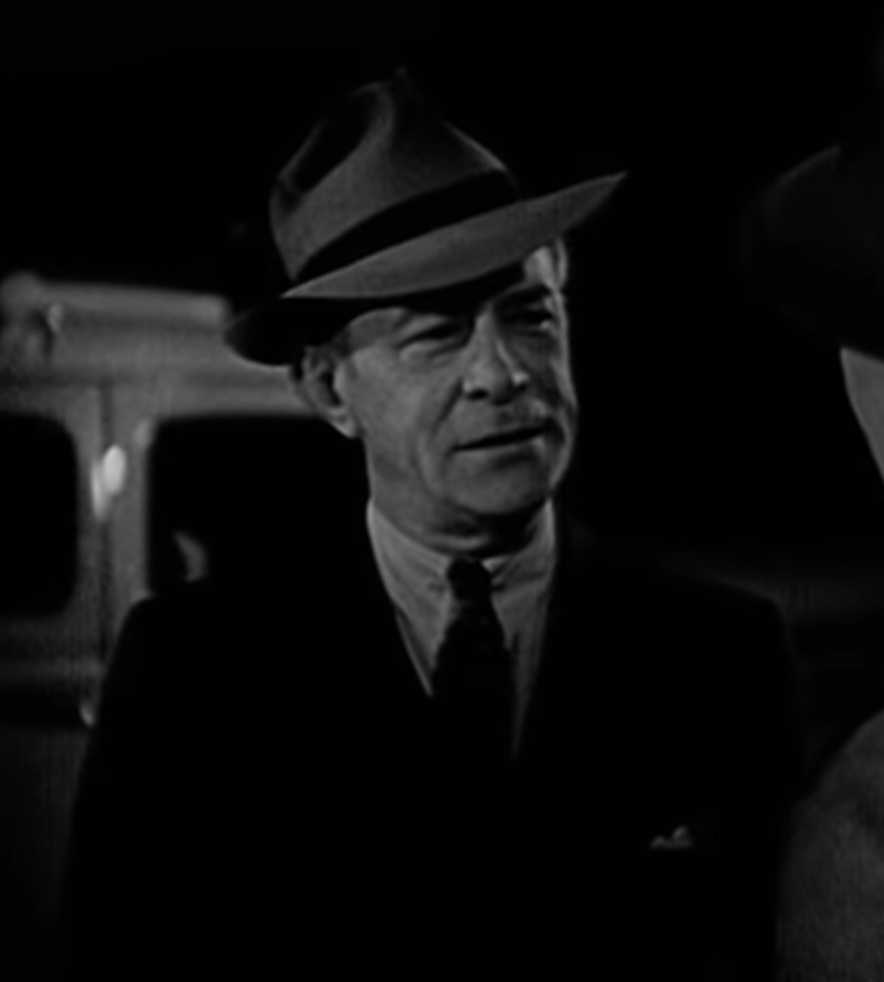
- Jackson in International Crime (1938)
- Born: July 4, 1886; New York City, New York, U.S.
- Died: September 7, 1967 (aged 81); Hollywood, California, U.S.
- Occupation: Actor
- Years active: 1899–1966

Thomas E. Jackson (July 4, 1886 – September 7, 1967) was an American stage and screen actor. His 67-year career spanned eight decades and two centuries, during which time he appeared in over a dozen Broadway plays, produced two others, acted in over a 130 films, as well as numerous television shows. He was most frequently credited as Thomas Jackson and occasionally as Tom Jackson or Tommy Jackson.

== Life and career ==
A native of New York City, Jackson began his career as a child actor in Broadway productions at the age of twelve, in the production The Ragged Earl, which had a short run at the Academy of Music in 1899. He appeared in several more productions as a youth over the next four years, before taking a ten-year absence from the stage. He returned to the theater in 1913, where he remained until the end of the 1920s, appearing in or producing a dozen plays.

His last stage performance was in the hit play Broadway, directed by George Abbott and Philip Dunning, which ran from 1926–28 at the Broadhurst Theatre. Jackson's portrayal of the sarcastic detective Dan McCorn earned him an invitation to reprise the role the following year in the film version of the play. Although he had appeared in minor roles in two 1910s films which had been produced in New Jersey (where the film industry was largely located prior to its move west), this was his first featured role. He returned only once more to Broadway, in the role of producer, for the successful 1928 play Gentlemen of the Press. The success of his performance reprising his role of Detective McCorn in Universal's 1929 film Broadway started Jackson's lengthy 38-year career in film and television. He followed up this initial success with several performances in 1930, and in 1931 with a notable performance in Little Caesar, starring Edward G. Robinson, again in the role of the sarcastic police officer.

One of his more noticeable roles was playing Richard Snow in the hit drama Manhattan Melodrama. Most of the roles throughout his career were smaller character roles, with occasional featured roles, as in 1935's The Call of the Wild, thrown in. Notable films in which he appeared included The Thin Man (1934); Angels With Dirty Faces (1938); Beau Geste (1939), Yankee Doodle Dandy (1942), Union Station (1950); and Stars and Stripes Forever (1952). He also appeared in the original 1945 version of the classic film noir The Big Sleep (1946), but his on-screen time was cut out when changes were made to it before its ultimate release in 1946. His part (along with the part played by actor James Flavin in the same scene) was eventually seen by the general audience when the original version was released in the 1990s. His final film role, a year before his death, was an uncredited bit as a minister in 1966's A Big Hand for the Little Lady.

Jackson began appearing in episodic television in 1954. He appeared in guest spots on dozens of television shows, such as Dragnet, Adventures of Superman, Have Gun – Will Travel, and 77 Sunset Strip. His last appearance was also in 1966, playing the Governor in an episode of the NBC sitcom, Camp Runamuck.

Jackson died of a heart attack in Hollywood at the age of 81.

== Selected filmography ==
- The Man of the Hour (1914)
- Broadway (1929)
- Double Cross Roads (1930)
- The Fall Guy (1930)
- For the Defense (1930)
- Little Caesar (1931)
- The Lawless Woman (1931)
- The Devil Plays (1931)
- Women Go on Forever (1931)
- Reckless Living (1931)
- The Reckoning (1932)
- Behind the Mask (1932)
- Escapade (1932)
- The Strange Love of Molly Louvain (1932)
- Strange Justice (1932)
- Afraid to Talk (1932)
- Big City Blues (1932) as Detective Quelkin
- Parachute Jumper (1933)
- Advice to the Lovelorn (1933)
- Strictly Personal (1933)
- Terror Aboard (1933)
- The Avenger (1933)
- Myrt and Marge (1933)
- No More Women (1934)
- George White's Scandals (1934)
- Melody in Spring (1934)
- Manhattan Melodrama (1934) as Asst. Dist. Atty. Richard Snow
- Name the Woman (1934)
- The Personality Kid (1934)
- Carnival (1935)
- The Irish in Us (1935)
- The Call of the Wild (1935)
- Little Miss Nobody (1936)
- Below the Deadline (1936)
- Grand Jury (1936)
- A Son Comes Home (1936)
- I'd Give My Life (1936)
- Hollywood Boulevard (1936)
- Wanted! Jane Turner (1936)
- Beware of Ladies (1936)
- A Man Betrayed (1936)
- Fugitive in the Sky (1936)
- Dangerous Holiday (1937)
- She's No Lady (1937)
- Blondes at Work (1938)
- International Crime (1938)
- I Stand Accused (1938)
- Torchy Gets Her Man (1938)
- Mystery of the White Room (1939)
- Nancy Drew... Reporter (1939)
- Free, Blonde and 21 (1940)
- Girl from God's Country (1940)
- Law of the Tropics (1941)
- Yankee Doodle Dandy (1942) as Stage Manager (uncredited)
- No Place for a Lady (1943)
- The Crime Doctor's Strangest Case (1943)
- The Woman in the Window (1944)
- Why Girls Leave Home (1945)
- The Face of Marble (1946)
- The Devil's Mask (1946)
- Valley of the Zombies (1946)
- The Mysterious Mr. Valentine (1946)
- Big Town (1947)
- Blazing Across the Pecos (1948)
- It Conquered the World (1956)
