= Torchy Blane... Playing with Dynamite =

1939 film by Noel M. Smith

- Movie poster
- Directed by: Noel M. Smith
- Screenplay by: Earle Snell; Charles Belden
- Story by: Scott Littleton
- Produced by: Bryan Foy
- Starring: Jane Wyman; Allen Jenkins; Tom Kennedy
- Cinematography: Arthur L. Todd
- Edited by: Harold McLernon
- Music by: Howard Jackson
- Production company: Warner Bros. Pictures
- Distributed by: Warner Bros. Pictures
- Release date: August 12, 1939
- Running time: 59 minutes
- Country: United States
- Language: English

Torchy Blane... Playing with Dynamite is a 1939 American mystery film directed by Noel M. Smith, written by Earle Snell and Charles Belden, and starring Jane Wyman, Allen Jenkins, and Tom Kennedy. It was released on August 12, 1939.

It is the final film in a series of nine Torchy Blane movies by Warner Bros. Pictures. The first film, Smart Blonde, was released in 1937.

== Plot ==
Torchy Blane is covering a bank robbery, one of a series committed by Denver Eddie. Returning to her newspaper, Torchy is stopped by a policeman for speeding. Because she doesn't have her driver's license with her, he takes her to court. While in court, Torchy encounters Jackie Mcguire, who is the girlfriend of notorious bank robber Denver Eddie and is sentenced to jail for shoplifting. After Torchy's boyfriend, Lt. Steve McBride, identifies her, Torchy is released. However, Torchy asks Steve to put her back in jail after realizing that Jackie is Denver Eddie's girlfriend.

Torchy gets herself thrown into jail so that she can befriend Jackie and use her to get a lead on Eddie. Torchy has no luck with her plan until she helps subdue another prisoner who tries to stab Jackie. Jackie suggests that she and Torchy escape from jail. Steve agrees to cooperate with Torchy's plan when she explains that the reward money for Eddie's capture will enable them to get married. With the help and collusion of Steve and the police, she escapes with Jackie to San Francisco, where Jackie is meeting her boyfriend. The two escapees are followed by Steve and his assistant, Gahagan. Steve hopes to capture Denver Eddie to collect the $5,000 reward as a down payment for a house for him and Torchy. He decides not to notify the local police of Eddie's expected arrival, but his actions are so suspicious that the police think he and Gahagan are criminals. Jim Simmons, a San Francisco policeman, follows them, but Steve succeeds in convincing him that Gahagan is a wrestler and that he is his manager.

Meanwhile, Torchy has arranged to signal Steve when Eddie arrives by hanging her stockings on the fire escape. Gahagan sees Jackie hang her stockings out to dry and they burst into the room, only to find that Eddie has not arrived yet. Torchy quickly makes up a story to explain their presence. When Eddie finally arrives, one of his men recognizes Steve as a policeman but pretends that Steve is another criminal. Steve, not knowing that they recognize him, invites Eddie to join him in robbing the wrestling stadium. Eddie agrees to the plan but arranges for his men to kidnap Steve on the way there. At the wrestling arena, another reporter recognizes Torchy and reveals her identity. After getting rid of Eddie's men, Steve rushes to the arena where Gahagan, posing as a wrestler named Harry the Horse, gets thrown out of the ring just in time to land on Eddie, who is trying to escape. Steve and Gahagan are credited with the arrest, and Torchy and Steve now have the money to marry.

== Cast ==
- Jane Wyman as Torchy Blane
- Allen Jenkins as Lt. Steve McBride
- Tom Kennedy as Gahagan
- Sheila Bromley as Jackie McGuire
- Joe Cunningham as Maxie
- Eddie Marr as Denver Eddie
- Edgar Dearing as Jim Simmons
- Aldrich Bowker as Judge Hershey

== Production ==
Torchy Blane... Playing with Dynamite is one of two films in the series starring actors other than Glenda Farrell as Torchy and Barton MacLane as Steve. The fifth Torchy Blane movie, Torchy Blane in Panama (1938), features Lola Lane and Paul Kelly in the leading roles. A leftover Torchy Blane script was adapted into the film Private Detective (1939), also starring Jane Wyman.

== Home media ==
Warner Archive released a boxed set DVD collection featuring all nine Torchy Blane films on March 29, 2011.
