= Torchy Blane in Panama =

1938 film by William Clemens

- Film poster
- Directed by: William Clemens
- Screenplay by: George Bricker
- Story by: Anthony Coldeway
- Produced by: Hal B. Wallis; Jack L. Warner
- Starring: Lola Lane; Paul Kelly; Tom Kennedy
- Cinematography: Tony Gaudio
- Edited by: Thomas Pratt
- Music by: Howard Jackson
- Production company: Warner Bros. Pictures
- Release date: May 7, 1938
- Running time: 59 minutes
- Country: United States
- Language: English

Torchy Blane in Panama is a 1938 American mystery film directed by William Clemens and starring Lola Lane, Paul Kelly, and Tom Kennedy. Released on May 7, 1938, the fifth film in a series of Torchy Blane movies by Warner Bros. Pictures. It is followed by Torchy Gets Her Man (1938).

Torchy, Steve, and Gahagan are on the trail of a bank robber aboard an ocean liner traveling from New York to Los Angeles via the Panama Canal.

== Plot ==
When policeman Gahagan witnesses a bank robbery during a parade of the Loyal Order of Leopards, he rushes off to call his boss, Steve McBride. Moments after Steve arrives at the bank, reporter Torchy Blane, Steve's girlfriend, arrives and does her own investigating. She is miffed to find another reporter there ahead of her. When Steve ignores her after she finds a lodge button wedged in a teller's cage, Torchy writes the story in her newspaper.

Determined to scoop the other newspapers, Torchy convinces Steve that the perpetrator of the recent bank robbery will travel with the Los Angeles delegation of Leopards through the Panama Canal and exchange the stolen money outside the country. After Steve leaves on an ocean liner without Torchy, she decides to parachute into the ocean, forcing the ocean liner to rescue her. On board, she ignores Steve and talks to all the Leopards, trying to identify the thief. Her attention focuses on Stan Crafton after Gahagan tells her that he did not know the secret Leopard handshake.

A search of his room comes up empty. When Stan sees Torchy leaving his room with Steve, he decides to sneak off the boat in Panama with the money, which he has hidden in a stuffed leopard mascot. Torchy sees him leave and follows him after leaving a note for Steve explaining the situation. As soon as the ship docks at the other end of the Canal, Steve flies back to look for Torchy. In the meantime, Stan has caught Torchy spying on him and plans to kill her. Steve spots her wet clothes drying on Stan's balcony and breaks in, shooting him. Gahagan helps Torchy with her newspaper story and Steve proposes again.

== Cast ==
- Lola Lane as Torchy Blane
- Paul Kelly as Steve McBride
- Tom Kennedy as Gahagan
- Anthony Averill as Stan Crafton
- Larry Williams as Bill Canby
- Betty Compson as Kitty
- Hugh O'Connell as Skinner
- James Conlon as Botkin
- Joe Cunningham as Maxie
- Frank Shannon as Captain McTavish
- Eric Stanley as Captain McDonald
- John Ridgeley as Reynolds
- George Guhl as Desk Sergeant Graves
- George Regas as Gomez
- James Nolan as Ship's Officer
- Jack Mower as Ship's Officer Nelson
- John Harron as Aviator

== Production ==
Torchy Blane in Panama is the first of two Torchy Blane films to star an actress other than Glenda Farrell as Torchy and Barton MacLane as Steve. Farrell and MacLane returned to the series for three additional films, with the last film in the series, Torchy Blane... Playing with Dynamite (1939), featuring Jane Wyman and Allen Jenkins.

== Home media ==
Warner Archive released a boxed set DVD collection featuring all nine Torchy Blane films on March 29, 2011.
