= The Fall Guy (1930 film) =

1930 film

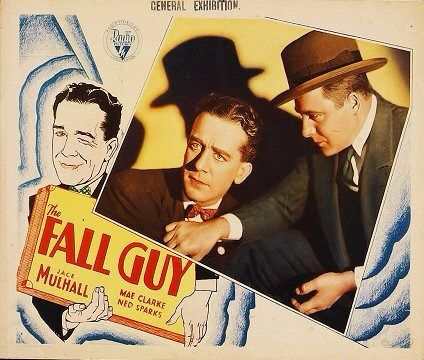
- Lobby poster
- Directed by: Leslie Pearce
- Screenplay by: Tim Whelan
- Based on: The play, The Fall Guy, a Comedy in Three Acts by George Abbott and James Gleason
- Produced by: William LeBaron; William Sistrom (assoc.)
- Starring: Jack Mulhall; Pat O'Malley; Mae Clarke
- Cinematography: Leo Tover
- Edited by: Archie Marshek
- Production company: RKO Radio Pictures
- Release date: June 15, 1930 (US)
- Running time: 66 minutes
- Country: United States
- Language: English

The Fall Guy is a 1930 American pre-Code crime drama film directed by Leslie Pearce and adapted for the screen by Tim Whelan. Based on the 1925 Broadway hit The Fall Guy, a Comedy in Three Acts, which was written by George Abbott and James Gleason, the RKO production stars Jack Mulhall, Pat O'Malley, and Mae Clarke. The year after this film's release, Clarke would become famous as a result of her minor role in another crime drama, The Public Enemy, in which James Cagney shoves a grapefruit into her face.

== Plot ==
When Johnny Quinlan loses his job in a drug store, he is afraid to tell his wife, Bertha, and therefore keeps up the pretense of leaving each morning for a non-existent job, as he begins the search for a new job. As the days pass and he is unable to find employment, their household, which includes his sister, Lottie, and Bertha's brother, Dan Walsh, goes through what little savings they have.

As he gets more desperate, he agrees to do small jobs for "Nifty" Herman, a small-time gangster. Nifty had loaned Johnny $15, as part of a plan to entice him to work for him. After Johnny gets insulted by a common laborer job offer from a neighbor, Nifty lies to him and says that he has a friend who will get him a managerial position at a liquor store. All Johnny has to do is hold onto a case of high-priced alcohol for a few days. Dubious, Johnny reluctantly agrees and takes the suitcase back to his apartment. However, when Bertha finds out who he got the suitcase from, she demands that he return it, threatening to leave him if he doesn't.

Taking the case back to Nifty, he finds the office locked, and so returns home. When he arrives, his sister's suitor, Charles Newton, is visiting. Newton is a government agent. Even though Johnny tries to hide the case, his efforts are futile, and Newton spies it and becomes suspicious, seeing a resemblance to a case he and his men have been attempting to track down. Opening it, he discovers it contains a cache of drugs. When he interrogates Johnny, he gets the whole story, and is about to arrest Johnny, when Nifty arrives to retrieve the suitcase. Johnny tricks Nifty into confessing, and then subdues him, when he is resisting the efforts of Newton and his deputies to arrest him. The film ends with Johnny being rewarded for the way he handled himself by becoming Newton's assistant.

== Cast ==
- Jack Mulhall as Johnny Quinlan
- Mae Clarke as Bertha Quinlan
- Ned Sparks as Dan Walsh
- Wynne Gibson as Lottie Quinlan
- Pat O'Malley as Charles Newton
- Thomas E. Jackson as Frederick "Nifty" Herman
- Tom Kennedy as Detective Burke
- Alan Roscoe as Detective Keefe

(cast list as per AFI database)

== Production ==
From March through June 1925 the play The Fall Guy, a Comedy in Three Acts, was performed at the Eltinge 42nd Street Theatre. The play starred Ernest Truex, and was written by playwright/producer George Abbott and the well-known character actor James Gleason. In February 1930, RKO purchased the rights to the play. The next month the entertainment trade paper Variety reported that Jack Mulhall would have the film's starring role, and another paper, The Film Daily, reported that RKO had designated William Sistrom as the supervising producer. Less than two weeks later RKO added Mae Clarke to the cast to costar with Mulhall. At around the same time, the film's producers also announced that Pat O'Malley had been signed to the project. Wynne Gibson was then added to the cast, and it was announced that Francis McDonald was also being assigned a role, although he did not appear in the finished film. The picture's filming was scheduled to start the first week in April, when it was revealed that Wynne Gibson and Tom Jackson had joined the cast as well. In late March it was reported that Leslie Pearce would direct the film and that Alan Roscoe had joined the cast.

== Reception ==
In his review in 1930, The New York Times' critic Mordaunt Hall gives the film a mostly favorable assessment, noting that the film is "a little crude in spots" but that "it at least succeeds in holding the attention, the action being fairly good combination of comedy and drama." Variety at the time describes the picture as "mildly entertaining" with situations that contain a "few laughs", although the trade paper adds that the film improves about midway through the story, and by its last two reels becomes "exciting". Variety in its review, however, is even less complimentary about the performances of the cast, which the paper judges to be below their capabilities, singling out Mae Clarke's effort in particular as disappointing.
