= The Devil Plays =

1931 film

- Directed by: Richard Thorpe
- Written by: Arthur Hoerl
- Produced by: George R. Batcheller
- Starring: Jameson Thomas; Florence Britton; Thomas E. Jackson
- Cinematography: M.A. Anderson
- Edited by: Richard Thorpe
- Production company: Chesterfield Pictures
- Distributed by: Chesterfield Pictures
- Release date: December 15, 1931
- Running time: 63 minutes
- Country: United States
- Language: English

The Devil Plays is a 1931 American pre-Code mystery film directed by Richard Thorpe and starring Jameson Thomas, Florence Britton and Thomas E. Jackson. It was given a British release under the alternative title of The Murdock Affair.

== Plot ==
Jerry Murdock enters a New York mansion on a dark night by a mysterious butler and bellhop, named Duncan. Upon entering the parlor, he finds himself in the middle of an interrogation being conducted by murder mystery writer Harry Forrest of the other guests, regarding who perpetrated the murder of a body lying on the parlor room floor. Each are being questioned regarding their movements prior to the murder. Forrest is holding a large knife that was found nearby on a table. When Jerry enters, he questions why they have not called the police which prompts everyone to laugh and reveal it was just a Murder Game. Even the dead person, played by Dick Quincy, arises. The group decides it is getting late and they are scheduled to sail out on a yacht to Cape Cod and Bar Harbor early in the morning at 7:00am so all should turn in for the night.

As the guests retreat to their rooms, the clock strikes midnight, but several guests remain awake. A mysterious woman wearing a mask enters the front door and sneaks into a room. It appears to be Rita Kane. Duncan is seen watching in the hallway. The Butler makes his rounds and seems amused that the front door is unlocked. The Quincys are in their room, when Dolores Quincy suddenly becomes dizzy and passes out in her bed. Dick Quincy then also says that he is dizzy too, and collapses into his bed. They realize that there must have been something in the water since they both drank it. Forrest is seen drinking water in his room. Forrest and Diana Amberson embrace and talk on Forrest's balcony about how they missed each other while she was abroad and their plans for the sailing trip tomorrow.

The Stiles are together in their room, but Grace tells her husband that she is worried about her sister Diana and then lies to him about going to see her sister and goes into Jerry's room instead.

Diana was secretly watching Grace go into Jerry's room from her doorway. Jerry and Grace discuss a bargain between them as Jerry tries to force himself on her. The intimation is that Jerry has something over on Grace. Diana enters Jerry's room and discovers her sister, Grace present with Jerry. Diana asks her to leave and let her handle Jerry. Grace leaves Diana alone with Jerry. But when Jerry now makes advances toward Diana, at first she rejects him, then it is intimated that she gives in to his demands.

Forrest is smoking alone on his terrace and sees Gordon Stiles attempting to leave his room through the balcony, but he does not and goes back inside his room. Grace Stiles knocks on her husband Gordon's door and asks if he is in bed. He obviously lies to her and says that he is in bed when he is still fully dressed and awake. Then, Gordon does leave his room through the balcony door. Duncan is seen sneaking in the hallway and tries to enter Jerry's room, but stops and hides and watches someone leave Jerry's room. It is not clear who; only a shadow is seen. Suddenly, Jerry's body is seen on his bedroom floor.

The police have appeared and begin interrogating the guests in the parlor regarding Jerry's murder. He has been stabbed to death with a large knife. They investigate the guests in the rooms next to Jerry's. The Quincys are found asleep and it is determined that they were poisoned with sleeping powder in their water container. Forrest had drunk water from his pitcher too, but was not poisoned so the police believe that his pitcher was poisoned afterwards. The police accuse Diana of the murder when they learn that she was in his room around the time of his death. To protect his lover Diane, Forrest tells them that he actually committed the murder, but the police do not believe him. They know he is a murder mystery writer and is a crime solver so Captain Brown lets him help with the investigation. Diane however is being arrested for murder and is going to be taken to the police station for questioning.

Forrest and the police question the Quincys because Jerry was the financial backer for the shady Tea Room that they run. They claim it's a lie, but they are overheard by the police admitting it's true.

Forrest and the police go to question Rita Kane, whom the newspaper reports is claiming to be Jerry's wife and has put in a claim for his estate. Just before they leave, police Sgt. Snyder discovers that he has misplaced the large knife that they found near Jerry's body.

While questioning Rita, her brother Duncan appears and tells the police that Rita met Jerry through him and that they were at Jerry's home the night before the murder. Duncan tells the police that Jerry had his allowance cut off by his family and he was afraid of being totally disinherited if his family found out that he was married to a "Showgirl" like Rita. Rita says that they got married because he could not "make the great, if you know what I mean, any other way" and that she knew that he was playing around. Duncan says that Rita threatened Jerry to go public with their marriage, but he convinced her to leave instead because she would be disinherited too if she went public.

The next day Forrest and the police go to Delores' Tea Room. The basement restaurant and bar is very busy with lots of customers. They all notice Gordon Stiles sitting alone nearby at a table eating. After Delores does not appear, they look behind the cashier's desk and discover Delores Quincy lying on the floor stabbed to death. The same long knife that killed Gerry is found near her body. Captain Brown tells Sgt. Snyder to call the medical examiner and Delores' husband, Dick. Captain Brown immediately becomes suspicious as to Gordon Stiles' presence. He appears shocked and upset when he's told that Delores has been murdered. Mr. Stiles says that he was called there by Delores so she could tell him something important, but that he had not yet spoken to her and he has no idea what it could be about. He agrees to go to the police station with Captain Brown. Mr. Quincy arrives at the restaurant and immediately creates a scene when he rushes to his wife's body still on the floor.

Since the real murderer is still on the loose, Forrest has Captain Brown release Diana from custody immediately. He, Diana and her sister Grace Stiles are back at the mansion and are awaiting Mr. Stiles' release from the police. Instead, Sgt. Snyder appears and tells Mrs. Stiles that Captain Brown wants her to come to the police station. Before they leave for the station, Diana gets a mysterious phone call from someone with a disguised voice. She is threatened that if she does not get Harry Forrest off the case she will be killed too.

The scene changes to Captain Browns office where Mr. Stiles is seen hanging up a phone. He tells the Captain that he was unable to get ahold of his lawyer. Back at the mansion, Forrest says he thinks he knows who made the call. Forrest, Grace Stiles and Sgt. Snyder all leave for the police station.

At Captain Brown's office, the police question Grace. She denies being close to Jerry Murdock and that she did not invite him to her weekend party, but that he insisted on attending. She tells them that before her marriage to Gordon she thought that she was in love with Murdock and that she was foolish enough to write him lots of letters. Jerry told her on the night of his murder that she had to go into his room if she wanted her letters back. That's when Diana entered the room. She insisted that Grace leave. The next morning all that Diana would tell her was that Jerry refused to give her the letters.

Gordon says that he knew about the letters and that had he bought them from Murdock. He pulls out a bound stack of letters and hands them to Grace. She says that there were many more than those. Captain Brown says no letters were found on Murdock's body and neither was the $10,000 that Mr. Stiles said he paid Jerry for the letters. No money was found on Delores's body either. Forrest says that's all they need from the Stiles' and that the captain should release them.

Forrest says that he believes that he knows who the killer is, but he does not have enough to make an arrest. Captain Brown wants to order all of the suspects to come to the station the next morning. Forrest asks him to hold off on that order until tonight because he thinks that might prompt the killer to flee. Captain Brown agrees and orders all the suspects to be watched. Forrest hand writes a note.

At Rita's apartment, she tells Duncan that a note arrived the previous night at 10:00pm. It says: "The police know who killed Jerry Murdock and Dolores Quincy," signed "A friend." Duncan says that he got one just like it. They also both got a phone call from the police ordering them to appear at the police station that morning. Duncan decides that they should flee. Officers arrest them as they are getting into their car and a struggle occurs with Rita.

All of the suspects are seated in the Captain Brown's office. Diane, Dick Quincy, Grace and Gordon Stiles, Duncan and Rita Kane. Sgt. Snider says that he followed Quincy to Grand Central Station where he bought a ticket to Canada. Forrest suggests to Captain Brown that all the evidence he needs is the $10,000 and that he should search everyone.

First, Gordon Stiles agrees to be searched and no money is found. Then Duncan tries to escape. After a struggle, he's searched and the money is found in his wallet. Duncan claims that he got the money from Dick Quincy. He says that he made him give it to him because he saw Quincy leaving Jerry's room and that he did not kill Murdock, Quincy did. Quincy says he's crazy and that he's never seen the money before. Then Forrest searches Quincy and finds the rest of the missing letters. Quincy tries to pulls his weapon, a cane that's really a gun, but an officer overpowers him and the gun goes off into the air. Dick Quincy is arrested for Jerry's murder and the murder of his wife. Forrest says Delores was killed because she knew too much and was going to tell Gordon Stiles before she was killed.

Forrest says that only one of their water glasses showed any sediment. And the next morning he noticed that only Delores' eyes showed the effects of the drug and that Mr. Quincy's did not, so he was not actually poisoned the night of Jerry's murder. Forrest says that he is going to put Captain Brown in his next book. Brown says he phoned Diana that she did not have to appear, but Diana said she was interested. Forrest and Diana leave the captain's office together holding hands.

== Cast ==
- Jameson Thomas as Harry Forrest
- Florence Britton as Diana Amberson
- Thomas E. Jackson as Inspector Brown
- Dorothy Christy as Dolores Quincy
- Richard Tucker as Gerald Murdock
- Lillian Rich as Grace Stiles
- Robert Ellis as Stiles
- Lew Kelly as Snyder
- Carmelita Geraghty as Rita Kane
- Edmund Burns as Dick Quincy
- Murdock MacQuarrie as Butler
- Jack Trent as Duncan

== Bibliography ==
- Monaco, James. The Encyclopedia of Film. Perigee Books, 1991.
