= Blondes at Work =

1938 film by Frank McDonald

- Theatrical release poster
- Directed by: Frank McDonald
- Screenplay by: Albert DeMond
- Produced by: Bryan Foy
- Starring: Glenda Farrell; Barton MacLane
- Cinematography: Warren Lynch
- Edited by: Everett Dodd
- Music by: Howard Jackson
- Production company: Warner Bros. Pictures
- Distributed by: Warner Bros. Pictures
- Release date: February 6, 1938
- Running time: 63 minutes
- Country: United States
- Language: English

Blondes at Work is a 1938 American comedy mystery film directed by Frank McDonald and written by Albert DeMond. The film stars Glenda Farrell and Barton MacLane. It is the fourth film in a series of Torchy Blane movies by Warner Bros. Pictures. Released on February 6, 1938, it is followed by Torchy Blane in Panama (1938).

The film focuses on the actions undertaken by Torchy to evade the efforts of Lieutenant Steve McBride to keep her from using inside information to "scoop" rival newspapers on the progress of police investigations.

== Plot ==
Lieutenant Steve McBride is in trouble with his boss, Captain McTavish, who suspects him of leaking police information to his girlfriend reporter Torchy Blane, which has resulted in complaints to the police department from rival newspapers. Torchy and Steve have an argument about this, and they agree that they will not exchange information about any police cases in the future. And Torchy is told by her boyfriend to lay off the latest murder case that he's handling; the killing of Marvin Spencer, the heir to the Bon Ton department store. Marvin was seen by Torchy being escorted into a cab by his friend Maitland Greer shortly before he was found dead in his room at the Park Plaza Hotel.

With Torchy's latest story of Marvin's murder hitting the front page of the newspaper, McBride's boss Capt. McTavish orders him to keep information away from Torchy. Capt. McTavish isn't really concerned about Torchy getting her hands on top-secret police information, he is secretly working for Torchy's rival newspaper, The Daily Express, which wants Torchy's access to top-secret police investigations cut off. Maitland is arrested for Marvin's murder. Torchy finds a clue which leads her to Louisa Revelle, the woman who was with Marvin the night he was stabbed. She admits to Torchy that Maitland was present that night and is upset with his arrest for murder, but will not reveal any more information. Torchy decides to eavesdrop on the trial's jury from a nearby supply closet. She overhears the jury's decision to declare Maitland guilty, and out-maneuvers both Capt. McTavish and the Daily Express into thinking that the jury's verdict is going to be “Not Guilty”. To their surprise, Maitland is found guilty, leaving the newspaper's editor red-faced.

At the same time, Torchy breaks the story in an extra edition in her own newspaper, before the verdict is announced in court. However, the judge sentences her to jail for contempt. Steve visits Torchy a few days later and has her released from jail. He informs her that after the verdict was announced, Louisa confessed to the crime; she stabbed Marvin when he threatened to shoot Maitland, who had become her new lover. Steve says that it looks like self-defense and speculates that both Louisa and Maitland will be cleared. Torchy is disappointed because she didn't have time to write the story and have it make the front page. Steve tells her that he filed the story for her, before the other newspapers and once again Torchy scoops them all.

== Cast ==
- Glenda Farrell as Torchy Blane
- Barton MacLane as Lieutenant Steve McBride
- Tom Kennedy as Detective Gahagan
- Rosella Towne as Louisa Revelle
- Donald Briggs as Maitland Greer
- John Ridgely as Officer Regan
- Betty Compson as Blanche Revelle
- Thomas E. Jackson as Detective Parker
- Frank Shannon as Capt. McTavish
- Jean Benedict as Salesgirl
- Carole Landis as Carol
- Suzanne Kaaren as Olive
- Theodor von Eltz as District Attorney
- Charles Richman as Judge Wilson
- Robert Middlemas as Boylan
- Kenneth Harlan as Marvin Spencer
- George Guhl as Desk Sergeant

== Home media ==
Warner Archive released a boxed set DVD collection featuring all nine Torchy Blane films on March 29, 2010.
