= Torchy Gets Her Man =

1938 film by William Beaudine

- Theatrical release poster
- Directed by: William Beaudine
- Screenplay by: Albert DeMond
- Produced by: Bryan Foy (uncredited)
- Starring: Glenda Farrell; Barton MacLane
- Cinematography: Warren Lynch; Arthur L. Todd
- Edited by: Harold McLernon
- Music by: Howard Jackson
- Production company: Warner Bros. Pictures
- Release date: November 12, 1938
- Running time: 63 minutes
- Country: United States
- Language: English

Torchy Gets Her Man is a 1938 American comedy-mystery film directed by William Beaudine, starring Glenda Farrell as Torchy Blane and Barton MacLane as Detective Steve McBride. It was released on November 12, 1938.

It is the sixth film in a series of Torchy Blane films by Warner Bros. Pictures. The film is followed by Torchy Blane in Chinatown (1939).

== Plot ==
Star reporter Torchy Blane is in the police station when secret service agent Charles Gilbert asks the police for help in catching "Hundred-Dollar Bill Bailey", a notorious swindler who has eluded police capture for 15 years and is passing expertly forged $100 bills. Gilbert tells detective Steve McBride that he suspects Bailey will pass the counterfeit money at the racetrack. He recruits the police in a sting operation at the local racetrack to catch Bailey, with Gilbert himself stationed at the $100 betting window.

Unknown to the police, Charles Gilbert is actually Bailey. He intends to use his position at the racetrack to pass off and exchange his phony bills for the real thing, together with a number of his accomplices posing as horse bettors. Captain McTavish forbids Steve to tell Torchy about the investigation. Meanwhile, Sergeant Gahagan is at the racetrack with a foolproof system that always wins big payouts, despite his terrible mathematics.

Torchy, determined to get her story, follows Gilbert from the racetrack and marks his automobile tire with creosote. Gahagan rents a German shepherd named Blitzen from a local pet store to track the scent. Gahagan and Torchy discover Gilbert's hideout, but they are spotted by Gilbert's men and held captive by the counterfeit ring as hostages. Torchy and Gahagan are tied up and a nitroglycerin bomb is set to go off after the criminals leave the house. Torchy sends the dog to get help. Meanwhile, Steve senses a false note in Gilbert's conversation and insists on accompanying Gilbert.

Blitzen shows up at the police station and leads Steve, a squad of police, and Gilbert to the gang's hiding place. Gilbert, anxious to leave the house where the bomb is about to go off, is exposed as Bailey and forced to reveal where the bomb and the captives are. Torchy and Gahagan are rescued by Steve, and Bailey is arrested.

== Cast ==
- Glenda Farrell as Torchy Blane
- Barton MacLane as Steve McBride
- Tom Kennedy as Gahagan
- Willard Robertson as Charles Gilbert
- Thomas E. Jackson (billed as Tommy Jackson) as Gloomy
- George Guhl as Desk Sergeant Graves
- Joe Cunningham as Maxie
- Frank Shannon as Captain McTavish
- Herbert Rawlinson as Tom Brennan
- Frank Reicher as The Professor
- Nat Carr as Schmidt, Blitzen's owner
- John Ridgely as Bugs

== Production ==
Glenda Farrell and Barton MacLane had been established as the stars of the Torchy Blane series until 1938, when the studio replaced them with Lola Lane and Paul Kelly. Exhibitors and fans complained, and Farrell and MacLane returned later that year for Torchy Gets Her Man. Their new director was William Beaudine, a resourceful comedy specialist just returned from directorial assignments in England. The producer, who did not receive screen credit, was Warner executive Bryan Foy.

The racetrack sequences were filmed on location at the newly opened Hollywood Park Racetrack. Studio head Jack L. Warner was a major stockholder.

== Reception ==
Canadian reviewer "Jay L." Smith reported: "Exhibitors will be glad to know that Glenda Farrell and Barton MacLane are back in the top spots in the Torchy Blane series, after a rather disastrous absence with Lola Lane and Paul Kelly attempting to fill their too-large shoes. The current Torchy picture is probably the best of the series, chiefly due to the story which makes for swell entertainment." Trade reviewer Pete Harrison agreed: "Of the pictures so far produced in this series, this one is the most exciting. The story is developed in a logical way, the action is fast and at times thrilling, and the tension is relieved by good comedy bits." Gus McCarthy of Motion Picture Herald caught the Hollywood preview: "There is a lot of entertainment in Torchy Gets Her Man. Tricky situations plus the glib dialogue lines of the leading and featured support players cause the film to move swiftly. The Saturday night preview audience seemed to derive considerable enjoyment from the show. While appreciative of the players' work, the crowd appeared to be of the opinion that the animal came close to stealing the show."

== Home media ==
Warner Archive released a boxed set DVD collection featuring all nine Torchy Blane films on March 29, 2011.
