= The Crooked Circle (1932 film) =

1932 film

- Film poster
- Directed by: H. Bruce Humberstone
- Written by: Ralph Spence (original screenplay); Tim Whelan (additional dialogue)
- Produced by: William Sistrom
- Cinematography: Robert Kurrle
- Edited by: Doane Harrison
- Distributed by: Sono Art-World Wide Pictures (1932 release); Astor Pictures (re-release)
- Release date: September 25, 1932
- Running time: 70 minutes
- Country: United States
- Language: English

The Crooked Circle is a 1932 American pre-Code film, a comedy-mystery directed by H. Bruce Humberstone.

In 1933, The Crooked Circle was the first feature film shown on television. In Los Angeles, the Don Lee Broadcasting System showed the film on March 10, 1933, over their experimental station W6XAO, transmitting an 80-line resolution mechanical television picture to a half-dozen or fewer receiving sets in the greater Los Angeles area. The film was shown again on June 18, 1940 on the NBC Television experimental station WX2BS, now WNBC-TV in New York City.

== Plot ==
Amateur detectives in the Sphinx Club are rivals of an evil gang known as The Crooked Circle. When a Sphinx tip leads to an arrest of a Crooked Circle member, they swear revenge on Sphinx member Colonel Theodore Walters. Nora Rafferty complains to Old Dan about life in creepy Melody Manor.

Brand Osborne intends to resign from the Sphinx Club, and his replacement is the Indian Yoganda, who proclaims, "Evil is on the way." When Rafferty sees Yoganda's turban, she says, "I'm sorry you got a headache, sir. Shall I get you a Bromo-Seltzer?" Policeman Arthur Crimmer attempts to straighten out the confusion.

== Cast ==
- ZaSu Pitts as Nora Rafferty
- James Gleason as Arthur Crimmer
- Ben Lyon as Brand Osborne
- Irene Purcell as Thelma Parker
- C. Henry Gordon as Yoganda
- Raymond Hatton as Harmon (The Hermit)
- Roscoe Karns as Harry Carter
- Berton Churchill as Col. Walters
- Spencer Charters as Kinny
- Robert Frazer as The Stranger
- Ethel Clayton as Yvonne
- Frank Reicher as Rankin
- Christian Rub as Old Dan
- Tom Kennedy as Mike, the policeman
