= He Couldn't Say No =

1938 film by Lewis Seiler

- Directed by: Lewis Seiler
- Written by: Norman Matson (short story); Robertson White; Joseph Schrank; Ben Grauman Kohn
- Based on: Larger than Life; 1936 play by Joseph Schrank
- Produced by: Bryan Foy (uncredited)
- Starring: Frank McHugh; Jane Wyman
- Cinematography: Arthur L. Todd
- Edited by: Frank Dewar
- Music by: Howard Jackson
- Production company: Warner Bros. Pictures
- Distributed by: Warner Bros. Pictures
- Release date: March 18, 1938
- Running time: 57 or 61 minutes
- Country: United States
- Language: English

He Couldn't Say No is a Warner Bros. romantic comedy film released on March 18, 1938. It stars Frank McHugh as a timid advertising man who is dominated by everyone, including his girlfriend, played by Jane Wyman. It is based on the play Larger than Life by Joseph Schrank and the short story of the same name by Norman H. Matson.

== Plot ==
Lambert T. Hunkins (Frank McHugh) works at a linoleum company. When his boss, Oxnard O. Parsons (Ferris Taylor), gives him a raise from $30 a month to $40, his girlfriend Violet's (Jane Wyman) mother, Mrs. Coney (Cora Witherspoon), decides that it is time for the two to get married. Lambert is too meek to object.

They go to an auction to buy some furniture, but when he sees a statue that resembles socialite Iris Mabby (Diana Lewis), the woman he adores from afar, he buys it, over the Coneys' objections. As Lambert is leaving, Iris's father, Senator Mabby (Berton Churchill), tries to buy the statue from him, but Lambert refuses to sell at any price. Their bargaining attracts the attention of a street reporter (John Ridgely), and the story of the humble office worker turning down a large sum of money gets into the media. The senator rushes off before he can be recognized. It turns out that Senator Mabby is mounting a public campaign against nudity, and the artwork (for which his daughter posed) would be terribly embarrassing to him. Iris does not care.

Iris visits Lambert, curious about the buyer. She finds he is like no other man she has ever met, and encourages him to stand firm against her father. Julia Becker, the sculptor, also pays a visit. Despite his weak protests, she insists she will send him two companion statues (also based on Iris).

Meanwhile, crook Hymie Atlas (Raymond Hatton) decides the statue must be worth a lot of money. He and his two thugs, Slug (William Haade) and Dimples (Tom Kennedy), barge into Lambert's apartment to steal it. When Senator Mabby and Iris show up to make another offer, the three gangsters hide in the next room. With a gun secretly pointed at him, Lambert is forced to insist on a price of $150,000. The senator refuses, and Iris is disillusioned.

After the Mabbys leave, Hymie assigns Dimples to keep an eye on Lambert. The next day, Lambert receives a telegram, bearing an Iowa museum's bid of $5000. Lambert manages to knock Dimples out and steal a linoleum truck to transport the artwork to the museum's representatives. However, Hymie and Slug return before he can load it. They tie him up and drive to the buyers, unaware that Lambert has outsmarted them (what they think is the covered statue is actually an unconscious Dimples). When Parsons brings the police, looking for his truck, Lambert leads them to the thieves. The crooks are captured, and an impressed Parsons gives Lambert his job back. When Violet and her mother also show up, an emboldened Lambert tells them he is not going to marry Violet. With the $5000 check in hand, he proposes to Iris instead; she cannot say no.

== Cast ==
- Frank McHugh as Lambert T. Hunkins
- Jane Wyman as Violet Coney
- Cora Witherspoon as Mrs. Coney
- Diana Lewis as Iris Mabby
- Berton Churchill as Senator Mabby
- Ferris Taylor as Oxnard O. Parsons
- William Haade as Slug
- Tom Kennedy as Dimples
- Raymond Hatton as Hymie Atlas
- John Ridgely as Ed, the reporter
- Chester Clute as Musgrave
- Cliff Clark as Auctioneer
- Rita Gould as Julia Becker
