= The Limejuice Mystery or Who Spat in Grandfather's Porridge? =

1930 short film

- Opening titles
- Directed by: Jack Harrison
- Produced by: Joseph Seiden
- Music by: Philip Braham
- Release date: 1930
- Running time: 9 minutes
- Country: United Kingdom
- Language: English

The Limejuice Mystery or Who Spat in Grandfather's Porridge? is a 1930 British marionette short film directed by Jack Harrison.

== Plot summary ==
The film begins in a Chinese opium den, where a woman is forced to dance. The customers begin to dance along and play musical instruments. In their inebriation, they begin a fight, and one of them pulls out a gun, proceeding to kill almost everyone. The police are called in. Herlock Sholmes (a parody of Sherlock Holmes) is called to solve a murder mystery at a bar.

== Soundtrack ==
- "For He's a Jolly Good Fellow"

== Reception ==
Thomas Leitch wrote: "In The Limejuice Mystery, or Who Spat in Grandfather's Porridge? (1930) Herlock Sholmes, though like the rest of the cast only a puppet, is again easily identified by his violin playing, his drug use, his outrageous disguises, his deerstalker and cape, his magnifying glass, and his triumph over a row of police officers in puppet lockstep."

== Home media ==
The film is included on the DVD Sherlock Holmes: The Archive Collection (2010).
