= Torchy Runs for Mayor =

1939 film by Ray McCarey

- Theatrical release poster
- Directed by: Ray McCarey
- Screenplay by: Earle Snell
- Produced by: Bryan Foy
- Starring: Glenda Farrell; Barton MacLane
- Cinematography: Warren Lynch
- Edited by: Everett Dodd
- Music by: Howard Jackson
- Production company: Warner Bros. Pictures
- Release date: May 13, 1939
- Running time: 60 minutes
- Country: United States
- Language: English

Torchy Runs for Mayor is a 1939 American drama-comedy film directed by Ray McCarey. It is the eighth film in the Torchy Blane film series by Warner Bros. Pictures, and the last film starring Glenda Farrell and Barton MacLane as Torchy Blane and Steve McBride. It was released on May 13, 1939. The film is followed by Torchy Blane... Playing with Dynamite (1939).

== Plot ==
Torchy Blane writes a series of articles criticizing the mayor John Saunders, accusing him of colluding with local crime boss Dr. Jerry Dolan and Dolan's illegal activities. Torchy is getting all her information straight from the mayor's office, using a listening device. Torchy's boyfriend, detective Steve McBride is concerned about the articles, believing that they are placing her in danger. Dolan asks his allies to withdraw advertising from Torchy's newspaper and pressure her editor into canceling her articles. Torchy is determined to prove that her articles are correct. She overhears Dolan telling the mayor about his "little red book" with all of his transactions and illegal payoffs and finds the book after breaking into Dolan's house. Dolan reports the burglary to police and demands the return of his book.

Torchy writes more articles exposing Dolan, but her story is rejected by her newspaper editor, fearing more syndicates will pull advertising from the paper. She goes to all other newspapers, who all refused to print the story, then she encounters Hubert Ward the publisher of a small and relatively unknown newspaper. Ward decides to print the story and Blane distributes the publication around the city with the help of Gahagan. After Torchy revealed the mayor's corruption, the resultant publicity forces a recall election with the citizens choosing Hubert Ward as the new candidate running against the corrupt mayor.

However, during the election, Ward is murdered by Dolan with a fatal injection. Steve, who is annoyed at Torchy's interference, writes her name as the new candidate as a joke. To his dismay, Torchy decides to run for mayor seriously and is winning voters. Dolan's man kidnaps Torchy and drugs her. Steve threatens Dolan to no avail but found an address where he believes Dolan is keeping Torchy. Steve and Gahagan track down the house and fight Dolan and his men and save Torchy. A half dozen policeman arrived at the house arresting them. Dolan manages to escape in Gahagan's police car but is killed when the car explodes. Torchy wins the election but decides, when presented with a baby to hold for a photograph, that she doesn't want to be the mayor and wants to marry McBride instead.

== Cast ==
- Glenda Farrell as Torchy Blane
- Barton MacLane as Steve McBride
- Tom Kennedy as Gahagan
- John Miljan as Dr. Dolan
- Frank Shannon as Captain McTavish
- Joe Cunningham as Maxie
- George Guhl as Desk Sergeant Graves
- Joe Downing as Spuds O'Brien
- Irving Bacon as Hubert Ward

== Home media ==
Warner Archive released a boxed set DVD collection featuring all nine Torchy Blane films on March 29, 2011.
