= Barton MacLane =

Actor, playwright, screenwriter (1902–1969)

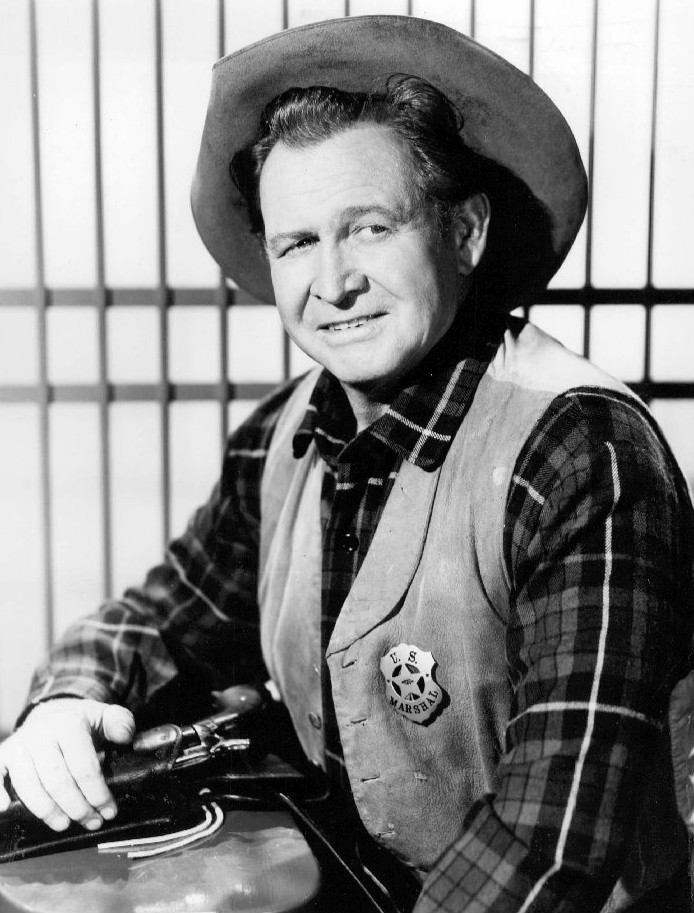
- MacLane in 1961
- Born: December 25, 1902; Columbia, South Carolina, U.S.
- Died: January 1, 1969 (aged 66); Santa Monica, California, U.S.
- Resting place: Valhalla Memorial Park Cemetery in North Hollywood
- Education: Wesleyan University; American Academy of Dramatic Arts
- Occupations: Actor; playwright; screenwriter
- Years active: 1926–1969
- Spouse: Charlotte Wynters MacLane (m. 1939)
- Children: 1

Barton MacLane (December 25, 1902 – January 1, 1969) was an American actor, playwright, and screenwriter. He appeared in many classic films from the 1930s through the 1960s, including his role as General Martin Peterson on the 1960s NBC television comedy series I Dream of Jeannie, with Barbara Eden and Larry Hagman.

== Early life ==
Barton MacLane was born in Columbia, South Carolina, on Christmas Day, 1902. He attended Wesleyan University in Middletown, Connecticut, where he excelled at American football. His first movie role, in The Quarterback (1926), was a result of his athletic ability. He then attended the American Academy of Dramatic Arts.

== Career ==
He made his Broadway debut in 1927, playing the assistant district attorney in Bayard Veiller's The Trial of Mary Dugan. He then performed in the 1928 Broadway production of Gods of the Lightning and was part of the original cast of Subway Express as Officer Mulvaney in 1929. He appeared in the Marx Brothers' 1929 film debut The Cocoanuts. MacLane made his first credited film appearance in the 1931 romantic drama His Woman. The following year, he wrote the play Rendezvous, which he sold to Arthur Hopkins. The play was performed on Broadway, with MacLane in a featured role.

=== Film work: 1930s–1950s ===
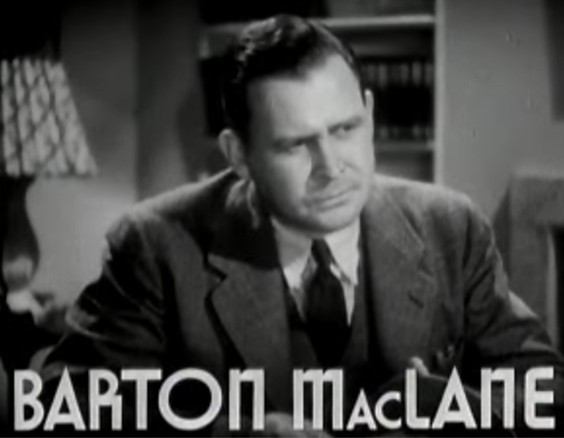
MacLane in Smart Blonde (1937)

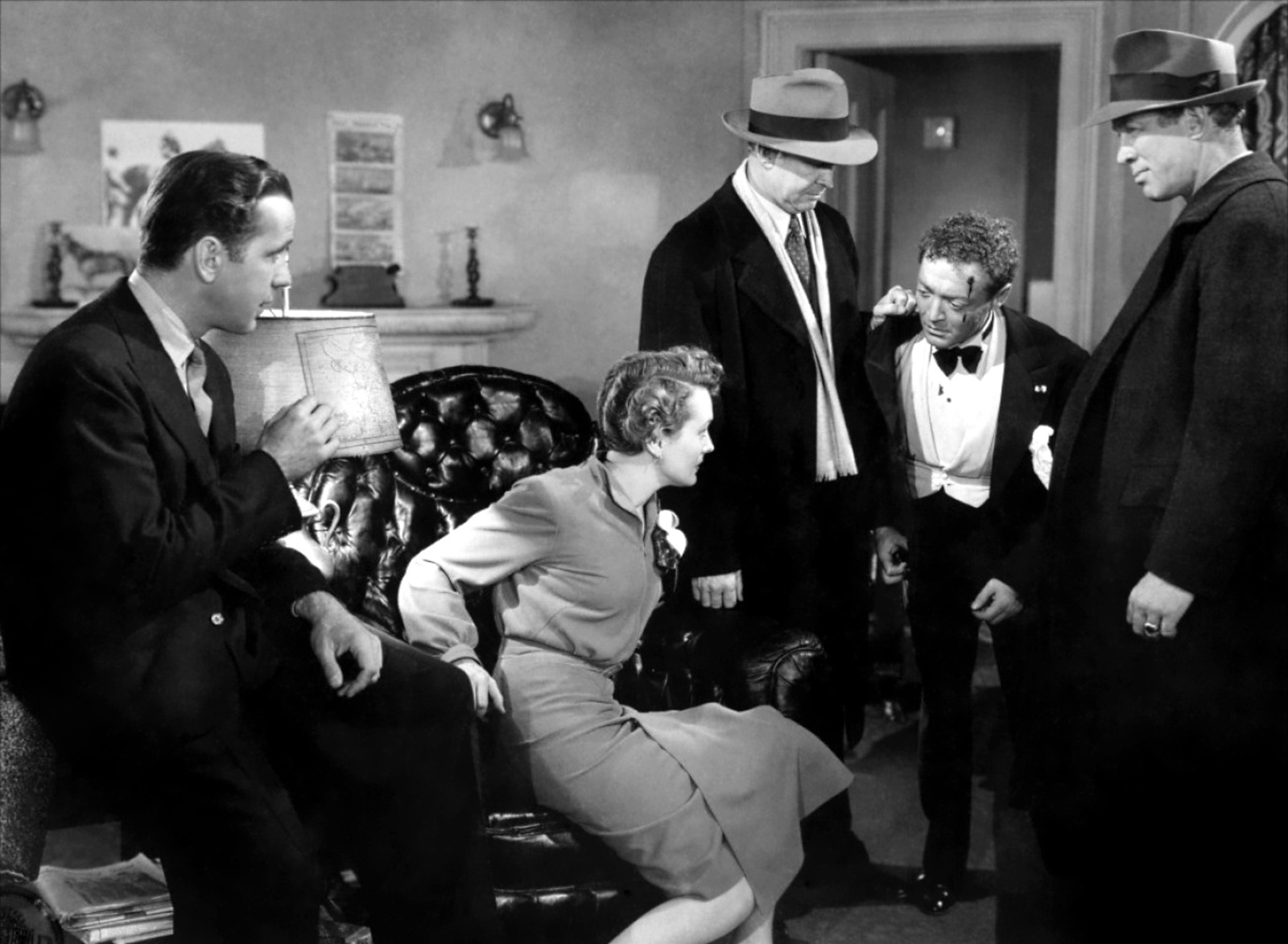
Humphrey Bogart, Mary Astor, MacLane, Peter Lorre and Ward Bond in The Maltese Falcon (1941)

The success of Rendezvous landed MacLane a contract with Warner Bros. and brought him to the attention of several renowned film directors, including Fritz Lang, Michael Curtiz, and William Keighley. As a result, throughout the remainder of the 1930s, MacLane was highly active in film, with major supporting roles in such productions as The Case of the Curious Bride, G Men, The Prince and the Pauper, and Lang's You Only Live Once and You and Me. He also played the role of detective Steve McBride, opposite Glenda Farrell in seven of the nine films featuring the fictional newspaper reporter Torchy Blane.

During the 1930s and 1940s, MacLane worked alongside Humphrey Bogart in several films. He played Lieutenant Dundy, who interacted with Bogart's Sam Spade in The Maltese Falcon, writer/director John Huston's acclaimed film noir based upon Dashiell Hammett's novel. MacLane again collaborated with both Bogart and Huston on the Academy Award-winning 1948 adventure film The Treasure of the Sierra Madre.

MacLane's many other film credits during the 1940s include The Big Street, Victor Fleming's Dr. Jekyll and Mr Hyde, Fritz Lang's Western Union, Reginald LeBorg's The Mummy's Ghost, and Frank Borzage's The Spanish Main. He also played villains in two Tarzan films starring Johnny Weissmuller – Tarzan and the Amazons and Tarzan and the Huntress. Some of MacLane's films during the 1950s include Kiss Tomorrow Goodbye, The Glenn Miller Story, and Three Violent People. In 1955 MacLane appeared as Jim Mablett in the movie Foxfire co-starring Jane Russell.

=== Television and final films ===
In the 1950s, MacLane began to appear regularly on television. Between 1953 and 1967, he guest starred on such programs as Conflict, Lux Video Theatre, Westinghouse Desilu Playhouse, Laramie, The Monkees, and Gunsmoke. In 1958 he played Sen. Harriman Baylor in the Perry Mason episode, "The Case of the Foot-Loose Doll". In 1960 he played Eugene Norris, Perry's friend and small-town sheriff, in "The Case of the Violent Village". In 1964 he played Archer Osmond in "The Case of the Ruinous Road".

During the 1960–1961 television season, MacLane was a series regular on twenty-seven episodes of NBC's western, Outlaws, in which he played Marshal Frank Caine. His last feature film was Buckskin (1968).

In 1965, MacLane, who had played real-life Air Force General "Hap" Arnold in The Glenn Miller Story, was cast in the recurring role of fictional Air Force General Martin Peterson on I Dream of Jeannie. He appeared in 35 episodes of the TV series between 1965 and 1969. Three of MacLane's episodes were aired after his death in January 1969. His character was replaced on later episodes of the series by General Winfield Schaeffer, portrayed by Vinton Hayworth, until Hayworth's death in 1970. Hayworth also died before all episodes featuring his character were broadcast.

== Personal life ==
MacLane played several musical instruments, including the violin, piano, and guitar. In 1939, MacLane married actress Charlotte Wynters. From the 1940s until his death, he maintained a cattle ranch in eastern Madera County, California, where he made his home when he was not acting. He adopted a daughter.

== Death ==
MacLane died of double pneumonia on New Year's Day 1969 at Saint John's Health Center in Santa Monica, California, a week after his 66th birthday. He had been admitted two weeks prior to his death.

MacLane was buried in Valhalla Memorial Park Cemetery.

== Recognition ==
For his contribution to the television industry, MacLane has a star on the Hollywood Walk of Fame at 6719 Hollywood Boulevard.

== Selected filmography ==
- The Quarterback (1926) as Football Player (uncredited)
- The Cocoanuts (1929) as Bather or Muscle Man at Beach (uncredited)
- His Woman (1931) as Crewman (uncredited)
- State's Attorney (1932) as Court Reporter (uncredited)
- The Thundering Herd (1933) as Pruitt
- Man of the Forest (1933) as Henchman Mulvey
- To the Last Man (1933) as Neil Stanley
- Tillie and Gus (1933) as Commissioner McLennan
- Big Executive (1933) as Harry the Guide
- Lone Cowboy (1933) as Policeman Baxter
- Hell and High Water (1933) as Dance Hall Manager
- All of Me (1934) as First Cop (uncredited)
- The Last Round-Up (1934) as Charley Benson
- Black Fury (1935) as McGee
- The Case of the Curious Bride (1935) as Detective Lucas
- G Men (1935) as Collins
- Go Into Your Dance (1935) as Duke Hutchinson
- Stranded (1935) as Sharkey
- Page Miss Glory (1935) as Blackie
- The Case of the Lucky Legs (1935) as Police Chief Bisonette
- Dr. Socrates (1935) as Red Bastian
- I Found Stella Parish (1935) as Clifton Jeffords
- Frisco Kid (1935) as Spider Burke
- Man of Iron (1935) as Chris Bennett
- Ceiling Zero (1936) as Al Stone
- The Walking Dead (1936) as Loder
- Times Square Playboy (1936) as Casey, Vic's Butler / Trainer
- Bullets or Ballots (1936) as Al Kruger
- Bengal Tiger (1936) as Cliff Ballenger
- Jailbreak (1936) as Detective Captain Rourke
- Smart Blonde (1937) as Steve McBride
- God's Country and the Woman (1937) as Bullhead
- You Only Live Once (1937) as Stephen Whitney
- The Prince and the Pauper (1937) as John Canty
- Draegerman Courage (1937) as Andrew Beaupre
- San Quentin (1937) as Lt. Druggin
- Fly-Away Baby (1937) as Steve McBride
- Ever Since Eve (1937) as Al McCoy
- Born Reckless (1937) as Jim Barnes
- Wine, Women and Horses (1937) as Jim Turner
- The Adventurous Blonde (1937) as Steve MacBride
- Blondes at Work (1938) as Lieutenant Steve McBride
- The Kid Comes Back (1938) as 'Gunner' Malone
- Gold Is Where You Find It (1938) as Slag Martin
- You and Me (1938) as Mickey Bain
- Prison Break (1938) as Joaquin Shannon
- The Storm (1938) as Capt. Cogswell
- Torchy Gets Her Man (1938) as Steve McBride
- Stand Up and Fight (1939) as Crowder
- Torchy Blane in Chinatown (1939) as Police Lieutenant Steve McBride
- I Was a Convict (1939) as Ace King
- Big Town Czar (1939) as Phil Daley
- Torchy Runs for Mayor (1939) as Steve McBride
- Mutiny in the Big House (1939) as Red Manson
- Gangs of Chicago (1940) as Jim Ramsey
- Men Without Souls (1940) as Blackie Drew
- The Secret Seven (1940) as Sam O'Donnell
- Melody Ranch (1940) as Mark Wildhack
- High Sierra (1941) as Jake Kranmer
- Come Live with Me (1941) as Barney Grogan
- Western Union (1941) as Jack Slade
- Barnacle Bill (1941) as John Kelly
- Hit the Road (1941) as James J. Ryan
- Manpower (1941) as Smiley Quinn
- Dr. Jekyll and Mr. Hyde (1941) as Sam Higgins
- Wild Geese Calling (1941) as Pirate Kelly
- The Maltese Falcon (1941) as Lieutenant Dundy
- All Through the Night (1942) as Marty Callahan
- The Big Street (1942) as Case Ables
- Highways by Night (1942) as Leo Bronson
- Man of Courage (1943) as John Wallace
- A Gentle Gangster (1943) as Mike Hallit
- Bombardier (1943) as Sgt. Archie Dixon
- Song of Texas (1943) as Jim Calvert
- The Underdog (1943) as John Tate
- The Crime Doctor's Strangest Case (1943) as Detective Rief
- Nabonga (1944) as Carl Hurst
- Marine Raiders (1944) as Sgt. Maguire
- The Mummy's Ghost (1944) as Inspector Walgreen
- Secret Command (1944) as Red Kelly
- Cry of the Werewolf (1944) as Lt. Barry Lane
- Gentle Annie (1944) as Sheriff Tatum
- Tarzan and the Amazons (1945) as Ballister
- Scared Stiff (1945) as George 'Deacon' Markham
- The Spanish Main (1945) as Capt. Benjamin Black
- Mysterious Intruder (1946) as Detective Taggart
- Santa Fe Uprising (1946) as Crawford
- San Quentin (1946) as Nick Taylor
- Tarzan and the Huntress (1947) as Paul Weir
- Jungle Flight (1947) as Case Hagin
- Cheyenne (1947) as Webb Yancey
- The Treasure of the Sierra Madre (1948) as Pat McCormick
- Relentless (1948) as Tex Brandow
- Silver River (1948) as 'Banjo' Sweeney
- The Dude Goes West (1948) as Texas Jack Barton
- The Walls of Jericho (1948) as Gotch McCurdy
- Angel in Exile (1948) as Max Giorgio
- Unknown Island (1948) as Capt. Tarnowski
- Red Light (1949) as Strecker
- Kiss Tomorrow Goodbye (1950) as Police Lt. John Reece
- Rookie Fireman (1950) as Captain Jess Henshaw
- Let's Dance (1950) as Larry Channock
- The Bandit Queen (1950) as Jim Harden
- Best of the Badmen (1951) as Joad
- Drums in the Deep South (1951) as Sgt. Mac McCardle
- Bugles in the Afternoon (1952) as Capt. Myles Moylan
- The Half-Breed (1952) as Marshal Cassidy
- Thunderbirds (1952) as Sgt. Durkee
- Kansas Pacific (1953) as Cal Bruce
- Cow Country (1953) as Marvin Parker
- Captain Scarface (1953) as Captain Scarface
- Sea of Lost Ships (1953) as Capt. Jack Matthews
- Jack Slade (1953) as Jules Reni
- The Glenn Miller Story (1954) as General Arnold
- Jubilee Trail (1954) as Deacon Bartlett
- Rails Into Laramie (1954) as Lee Graham
- Hell's Outpost (1954) as Sheriff Olson
- Treasure of Ruby Hills (1955) as 'Chalk' Reynolds
- The Silver Star (1955) as Henry 'Tiny' Longtree
- Foxfire (1955) as Jim Mablett
- Jail Busters (1955) as Captain Jenkins, Head Guard
- Last of the Desperados (1955) as Mosby, Gang Leader
- Jaguar (1956) as Steve Bailey
- Backlash (1956) as Sgt. George Lake
- Wetbacks (1956) as Karl Shanks
- The Man is Armed (1956) as Det. Lt. Dan Coster
- Naked Gun (1956) as Joe Barnum
- Three Violent People (1956) as Yates
- Hell's Crossroads (1957) as Pinkerton Agent Clyde O'Connell
- Sierra Stranger (1957) as Lem Gotch
- Naked in the Sun (1957) as Wilson
- Girl in the Woods (1958) as Big Jim
- Girl on the Run (1958) as Francis J. Brannigan
- Frontier Gun (1958) as Simon Crayle
- The Geisha Boy (1958) as Maj. Ridgley
- Gunfighters of Abilene (1960) as Seth Hainline
- Noose for a Gunman (1960) as Carl Avery
- Pocketful of Miracles (1961) as Police Commissioner
- Law of the Lawless (1964) as Big Tom Stone
- The Rounders (1965) as Tanner
- Town Tamer (1965) as James Fenimore Fell
- Arizona Bushwhackers (1968) as Sheriff Grover
- Buckskin (1968) as Dr. H. 'Doc' Raymond

== Television credits ==
Year	Series	Role	Notes
1955	The Pepsi-Cola Playhouse	Captain Hansen	"The Man Nobody Wanted"
1955	Schlitz Playhouse of Stars	Chief Brooks	"Two-Bit Gangster"
1956	Crossroads		"The Strange Bequest"
1956	Cheyenne	Martin Storm	"The Storm Riders"
1956	The Kaiser Aluminum Hour	Dan Royal	"Man on the White Horse"
1957	Tales of Wells Fargo	Clanton	"The Target", with Kelo Henderson cast as Ike Clanton
1957	Telephone Time	Pete Devlin	"Plot to Save a Boy"
1957	Circus Boy	Pinkerton Detective Nolan	1 episode, "The Tumbling Clown"
1958	Kraft Television Theatre	Potter	"Code of the Corner"
1958	77 Sunset Strip	Brannigan	"Girl on the Run"
1959	Black Saddle	General Orester Fowler	"Client: Braun"
1959	Walt Disney Presents	Bob Scanlon	2 episodes: "The Robber Stallion" and "Wild Horse Revenge"
1959–1964	Perry Mason	Senator Harriman Baylor / Sheriff Eugene Norris / Harold Minter / Archer Osmond	4 episodes
1960	Walt Disney Presents	Rawls Kettrick	The Nine Lives of Elfego Baca miniseries, episode "Friendly Enemies at Law"
1960	Laramie	Cameron Gault	"Street of Hate"
1960	Overland Trail	Big Jed Braddock	"Lawyer in Petticoats"
1960	Tightrope!	Vince Baron	"Gangster's Daughter"
1960–1961	Outlaws	Marshal Frank Caine	27 episodes
1962	Laramie	Mel Bishop	"The High Country"
1963	Laramie	Ed Bishop	"The Wedding Party"
1963	Laramie	Owen Richards	"Trapped"
1965–1969	I Dream of Jeannie	General Peterson	35 episodes, (final appearance)
1966	The Munsters	Big Roy	"Herman Picks a Winner"
1966	Gunsmoke	Herkimer Crawford	"Honor Before Justice"
1967	Gunsmoke	Willard Kerner	"Noose of Gold"
1967	Hondo	Markham	"Hondo and the Gladiators"
1967	The Monkees	Black Bart / Ben Cartwheel	S2:E13, "Monkees in Texas"
