= Smart Blonde =

1937 film by Frank McDonald

- Theatre trailer
- Directed by: Frank McDonald
- Screenplay by: Kenneth Gamet; Don Ryan
- Based on: No Hard Feelings; 1938 story in Black Mask by Frederick Nebel
- Produced by: Jack L. Warner; Hal B. Wallis
- Starring: Glenda Farrell; Barton MacLane; Winifred Shaw
- Cinematography: Warren Lynch
- Edited by: Frank Magee
- Music by: Heinz Roemheld
- Production company: Warner Bros. Pictures
- Distributed by: Warner Bros. Pictures
- Release date: January 2, 1937
- Running time: 59 minutes
- Country: United States
- Language: English

Smart Blonde is a 1937 American mystery film directed by Frank McDonald. Starring Glenda Farrell as Torchy Blane, a fast-talking wisecracking female reporter, teaming up with her boyfriend detective Steve McBride, to solve the killing of an investor who just bought a popular local nightclub.

The first of nine Torchy Blane films by Warner Bros. Pictures, it was released on January 2, 1937. The film is followed by Fly-Away Baby (1937).

== Plot ==
Torchy Blane a reporter for the Morning Herald interviews Tiny Torgenson on the train. He is purchasing the Million Club and various gambling and sporting enterprises from his friend Fitz Mularkey. Fitz has decided to quit the business due to his upcoming marriage to Marcia Friel. When Torchy and Tiny arrive at the train station, as they leave Union Station, Tiny is shot and killed. His murder is witnessed by Torchy and she calls her newspaper with the story.

Torchy goes with her boyfriend, detective Steve McBride, who is in charge of investigating the murder case, to the Million Club and tells Fitz Mularkey about Tiny's murder. Fitz, being very good friends with Tiny, wants to catch the murderer himself before the police can, but Steve advises him to do otherwise. While Steve investigates, Torchy learns from the club's hat check girl Dixie that the club singer Dolly Ireland was in love with Fitz and that Fitz's right-hand man and bodyguard, Chuck Cannon, was angry about losing his job. Steve suspects the other bidders for the business for Tiny's murder, but Torchy suspects Chuck. She persuades Steve to look for Chuck, and while they are at Chuck's apartment, Fitz shows up and demands to know about the police investigation on the case. Steve later learns that Chuck and Dolly were seen at Union Station just before Tiny was killed.

Meanwhile, Torchy has afternoon tea with Fitz's fiancée Marcia, who asks Torchy to convince Fitz to sell his business to anyone who wants to buy it. Chuck is later found dead in his hotel room. Steve immediately suspects Fitz, as the evidence points to him being the killer. Fitz is confronted by Steve, but escapes. Steve doesn't believe Fitz is the killer and is covering for someone else. When the forensics report reveals that Chuck's gun did not kill Tiny, Steve questions Marcia, who tells him that because Chuck had threatened her, she is afraid that Fitz killed him to protect her. Torchy becomes suspicious when Marcia and her brother Lewis Friel tell conflicting stories about their parents. Torchy, Steve, and Gahagan go to Marcia's apartment to find Fitz. Torchy exposes Marcia and Lewis as phonies (and not siblings): they are con artists out to steal Fitz's money. Lewis is revealed as the killer of both Tiny and Chuck. He killed Tiny because he would have been able to recognize Marcia as an imposter, and Chuck because he was close to exposing them. Lewis pulls a gun but is shot by Fitz, and Marcia is arrested. Later, Fitz decides to keep the business and realizes his future is with Dolly, and Steve proposes to Torchy.

== Cast ==
Glenda Farrell and Barton MacLane in Smart Blonde (1937)

- Glenda Farrell as Torchy Blane
- Barton MacLane as Steve McBride
- Wini Shaw as Dolly Ireland
- Max Wagner as Chuck Cannon
- Addison Richards as Fitz Mularkey
- Robert Paige as Lewis Friel
- Craig Reynolds as Tom Carney
- Charlotte Wynters as Marcia Friel
- Jane Wyman as Dixie
- Joseph Crehan as Tiny Torgenson
- Tom Kennedy as Gahagan
- Frank Faylen as Ted Parks

== Production ==
In 1936, Warner Bros. began to develop an adaptation of the MacBride and Kennedy stories by detective novelist Frederick Nebel. For the film version, Kennedy was changed to a woman named "Torchy" Blane and became the love interest of the cop. Torchy was also more compatible with the Hays Code than a faithful on-screen adaptation of Kennedy would have been.

Director Frank MacDonald immediately knew who he wanted for the role of Torchy Blane. Glenda Farrell had already played newspaper reporters in earlier Warner Bros. films Mystery of the Wax Museum (1933) and Hi, Nellie! (1934); she was quickly cast in the title role, with Barton MacLane as Steve McBride. Farrell and MacLane would star in seven of the nine Torchy Blane movies.

The film was based on Nebel's short story "No Hard Feelings" published in the Black Mask magazine. The story was later adapted again as the 1941 film A Shot in the Dark. The movie's working title during filming was No Hard Feelings. The music and lyrics for the song "Why Do I Have to Sing a Torch Song" was written by M. K. Jerome and Jack Scholl.

== Home media ==
Warner Archive released a boxed set DVD collection featuring all nine Torchy Blane films on March 29, 2011.

== Reception ==
Frank S. Nugent of The New York Times writes: "In Smart Blonde, in which Glenda Farrell imitates a reporter and Barton MacLane libels the homicide squad, we have a murder mystery solved by an endless succession of door-openings and shuttings, taxi-hailings, jumping in and out of automobiles, and riding up and down in elevators. Ms. Shaw's pet antipathies are present, too, as well as one shot of Miss Farrell swinging aboard a moving train. For all this activity the film is a static and listless little piece which never made us at all curious about the killer of Tiny Torgensen, night club operator, and Chuck Cannon, who had been Suspect No. 1 until he also died of lead poisoning. I seem to remember having seen the story in pictures before; strange that the same mistake should have been made again."
