= Torchy Blane in Chinatown =

1939 film by William Beaudine

- Theatrical release poster
- Directed by: William Beaudine
- Written by: Frederick Nebel; Murray Leinster
- Screenplay by: George Bricker
- Based on: The Purple Hieroglyph; 1920 novel by Murray Leinster
- Produced by: Hal B. Wallis; Jack L. Warner
- Starring: Glenda Farrell; Barton MacLane; Patric Knowles
- Cinematography: Warren Lynch
- Edited by: Frederick Richards
- Music by: Howard Jackson
- Production company: Warner Bros. Pictures
- Distributed by: Warner Bros.
- Release date: February 4, 1939
- Running time: 58 minutes
- Country: United States
- Language: English

Torchy Blane in Chinatown is a 1939 American mystery film directed by William Beaudine and starring Glenda Farrell and Barton MacLane. Released on February 4, 1939, it is the seventh film in the Torchy Blane film series by Warner Bros. Pictures and is followed by Torchy Runs for Mayor (1939).

The rivalry between newspaper reporter Torchy Blane and her boyfriend, Lieutenant Steve McBride, escalates as the two investigate a death threat involving priceless jade tablets.

== Plot ==
On behalf of Senator Baldwin, the owner of the world's largest Chinese jade collection, detective Steve McBride investigate a death threat involving the priceless jade tablets that were brought to the United States by three adventurers, who are now on the hit list of an oriental gang. A note written in Chinese warns the impending doom at midnight unless a ransom is paid for the valuable jades, which have been stolen. Steve is put on the case to protect the people who were involved in smuggling the jades into the country.

That night, Torchy Blane joins Steve at the Adventurers Club where he and his assistant Gahagan are guarding the threatened victims, Fitzhugh, Mr. Mansfield and Captain Condon. Once midnight has passed, they leave, but Fitzhugh is machine-gunned in his car and killed. A note found in the car warns that Mansfield will be the next to die. He is later found dead after smoking a poisoned cigarette, and his body vanishes mysteriously before the coroner arrives at the crime scene.

Senator Baldwin's daughter Janet Baldwin and her fiancé Dick Staunton, are ordered by the mysterious killer to deliver $250,000 ransom to the last buoy in the New York city harbor. Torchy discovered that Fitzhugh's fingerprints and those of the body in the morgue do not match. She joins Steve in a US Navy submarine as Dick rides out to pay the ransom. At the appointed place, Torchy and Steve surface in the submarine, just in time to save Dick and prove that the murders were all part of an elaborate plot by Fitzhugh, Mansfield, and Condon to extort money from Senator Baldwin.

== Cast ==
- Glenda Farrell as Torchy Blane
- Barton MacLane as Lieutenant Steve McBride
- Tom Kennedy as Gahagan
- Henry O'Neill as Senator Baldwin
- Patric Knowles as Captain Condon
- James Stephenson as Mr. Mansfield
- Janet Shaw as Janet Baldwin

== Reception ==
Asked to name his favorite movies, Stephen Sondheim included Torchy Blane in Chinatown "on a list with Citizen Kane, Smiles of a Summer Night, Pygmalion, and other classics. The film's star was [Sondheim's mother,] Foxy's close friend Glenda Farrell, who had made sure to have the screenwriters include in the film a party scene [42 minutes in] in which her character says to a departing guest, 'Goodnight, Mrs. Sondheim.'"

== Home media ==
Warner Archive released a boxed set DVD collection featuring all nine Torchy Blane films on March 29, 2011.
