= Private Detective (film) =

1939 film by Noel M. Smith

- Theatrical release poster
- Directed by: Noel M. Smith
- Screenplay by: Earle Snell; Raymond L. Schrock
- Based on: Invitation to Murder; 1937 novel in Pocket Detective Magazine by Kay Krausse
- Produced by: Bryan Foy
- Starring: Jane Wyman; Dick Foran
- Cinematography: Ted D. McCord
- Edited by: Harold McLernon
- Music by: Rex Dunn
- Production company: Warner Bros. Pictures
- Release date: December 9, 1939
- Running time: 55 minutes
- Country: United States

Private Detective is a 1939 American drama film directed by Noel M. Smith and written by Earle Snell and Raymond L. Schrock. The film stars Jane Wyman and Dick Foran and is based on the short story "Invitation to Murder" by Kay Krausse in the Pocket Detective Magazine. It was released by Warner Bros. Pictures on December 9, 1939.

== Plot ==
Millard Lannon sues his ex-wife Mona Lannon for the custody of their son. The owner of the Nation-Wide Detective Agency, where Myrna Winslow works, asks her to testify against Mona. Myrna refuses because Millard only wants the custody of his son to have access to the child's trust fund. When her boss insist that she testify, Myrna decides to quit her job and marry her boyfriend, police lieutenant Jim Rickey. Jim is thrilled when Myrna arrives at the police station and wishes to be married that night.

However, Myrna is distracted when she overhears an incoming call from Millard, demanding police protection because Mona has threatened his life. This was a scheme concocted by his lawyer, Nat Flavin, who kills Millard in his home later that night. Mona is seen leaving his house just as the gunshot is heard by a neighbor. Myrna tags along as Jim and his assistant Brody investigate the crime. She finds Mona hiding in a hotel and tells her that the police suspect her fiancé, Donald Norton. Mona lies and says she is the killer. Myrna believes Mona is innocent and helps her escape. Meanwhile, Nat is trying to persuade Donald to turn Mona in and also hire him as her defense lawyer. Jim and Brody arrive at Donald's home. They have a confrontation with Donald and he escapes.

Myrna decides to help both Mona and Donald. She questions Nat the next morning and learns that he has appointed himself the legal guardian of Mona's son. Jim is not happy with Myrna's interference in the case. Myrna later finds evidence confirming Nat's guilt in his office. She writes a report saying that Nat killed Millard and framed Mona in order to get her son's trust fund. As she is telling Jim on the telephone to meet her at the office, Nat arrives and knocks Myrna unconscious and takes her to his beach house. He is met by his partner Millard's chauffeur, Chick Jerome. While the unconscious Myrna is placed in a car in the garage, Mona and Donald arrive to give Nat a retainer to defend them. Jim and Brady burst in, just when Chick is about to give Mona and Donald poisoned drinks. They had found Myrna's report about Nat in his office, and rescue Myrna before she becomes asphyxiated in the car. After a struggle, they successfully capture Nat and Chick.

== Cast ==
- Jane Wyman as Myrna Winslow
- Dick Foran as Jim Rickey
- Gloria Dickson as Mona Lannon
- Maxie Rosenbloom as Brody
- John Ridgely as Donald Norton
- Morgan Conway as Nat Flavin
- John Eldredge as Millard Lannon
- Henry Blair as Bobby Lannon
- Leo Gorcey as newsboy (uncredited)
