= The Adventurous Blonde =

1937 film by Frank McDonald

- Theatrical release poster
- Directed by: Frank McDonald
- Screenplay by: Robertson White; David Diamond
- Produced by: Hal B. Wallis; Jack L. Warner
- Starring: Glenda Farrell; Barton MacLane; Anne Nagel
- Cinematography: Arthur L. Todd
- Edited by: Frank Magee
- Music by: Howard Jackson
- Production company: Warner Bros. Pictures
- Distributed by: Warner Bros. Pictures
- Release date: November 13, 1937
- Running time: 61 minutes
- Country: United States
- Language: English

The Adventurous Blonde is a 1937 American comedy mystery film directed by Frank McDonald and starring Glenda Farrell, Barton MacLane and Anne Nagel. It was written by Robertson White and David Diamond. The film is the third in the Torchy Blane series and was released on November 13, 1937, by Warner Bros. Pictures.

== Plot ==
Torchy Blane is handed a telegram, which she reads before realizing that it was intended for Theresa Gray, the woman sitting next to her on the train. Torchy's own telegram is from her boyfriend detective Steve McBride announcing that he will have a minister waiting to marry them when she arrives at the station.

Rival reporters Mat, Dud, Mugsy and Pete, who are jealous of Torchy's success and fear that her marriage to Steve will prevent them from acquiring news tips from the police department, play a practical joke on her. The reporters hire an actor to play dead and they phone Steve with the news. They hope that Torchy will report the death and that a second paper owned by publisher Mortimer Gray will embarrass her by printing the truth. A fake broadcast comes to Steve and Torchy while driving to the minister in Steve's police car. They hurry to the scene of the crime and Torchy phones the story into her newspaper. An extra edition headlining the murder is quickly on the streets, and the opposition newspapers print a denial of Torchy's story.

However, the hoax victim Harvey Hammond has actually been murdered and Torchy once again has beat other reporters to the story. Suspects in Harvey's death including actress Grace Brown, Grace's boyfriend Hugo Brand and Theresa Gray, Hammond's former lover. Torchy frames Theresa for the murder in order to force a confession from Theresa's husband Mortimer. It was Mortimer, who knew about the proposed joke and was jealous of his wife's relationship with Hammond, who seized the opportunity to kill him. He confessed to the crime before taking a dose of poison. Cleared of any suspicion, Hugo and Grace are married by Torchy's waiting magistrate, and Torchy and Steve postpone their wedding once again.

== Cast ==
- Glenda Farrell as Torchy Blane
- Barton MacLane as Steve MacBride
- Anne Nagel as Grace Brown
- Tom Kennedy as Gahagan
- George E. Stone as Pete
- Natalie Moorhead as Theresa Gray
- William Hopper as Matt
- Charley Foy as Dud
- Anderson Lawler as Hugo Brand
- Bobby Watson as Mugsy
- Charles C. Wilson as Mortimer Gray

== Home media ==
Warner Archive released a DVD box-set collection featuring all nine Torchy Blane films on March 29, 2011.
