= Eddy Chandler =

American actor (1894–1948)

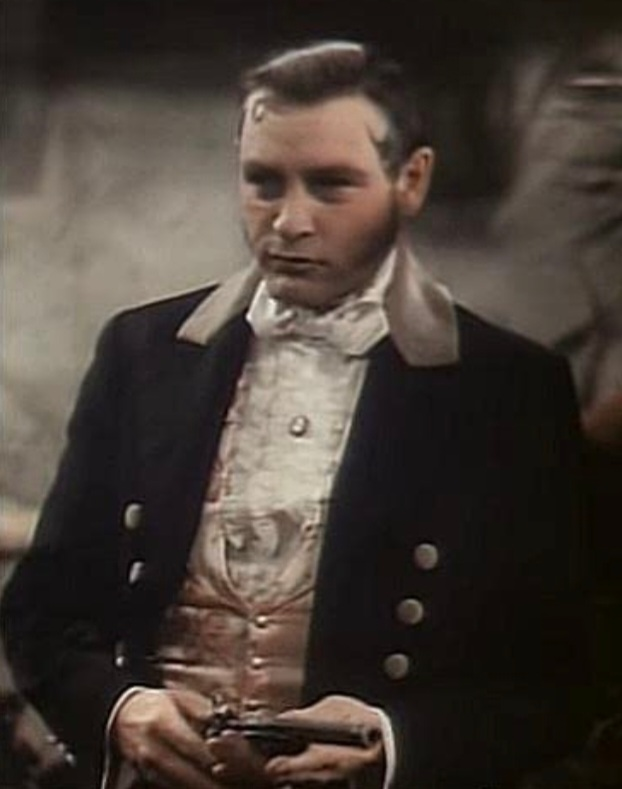
- Chandler in Dixiana (1930)
- Born: March 12, 1894; Wilton Junction, Iowa, U.S.
- Died: March 23, 1948 (aged 54); Los Angeles, California, U.S.
- Occupation: Actor
- Years active: 1916–1947

Eddy Chandler (March 12, 1894 – March 23, 1948) was an American actor who appeared, mostly uncredited, in more than 300 films. Three of these films won the Academy Award for Best Picture: It Happened One Night (1934), You Can't Take It with You (1938), and Gone with the Wind (1939). Chandler was born in the small Iowa city of Wilton Junction and died in Los Angeles. He served in World War I. He died on March 23, 1948 unexpectedly from complications of a coronary occlusion.

== Filmography ==
- Marriage in Transit (1925) - Conspirator
- Flaming Fury (1926) - Bethune
- Flashing Fangs (1926) - Red' Saunders
- Through Thick and Thin (1927) - Bull
- Flying Luck (1927) - The Corporal
- Young Whirlwind (1928) - Johnson
- No More Children (1929) - Mike
- She Goes to War (1929) - Top Sergeant
- Flight (1929) - Marine Sergeant - Panama's Buddy (uncredited)
- Hurricane (1929) - Bull
- Welcome Danger (1929) - Cop (uncredited)
- Alias French Gertie (1930) - Motorcycle Cop (uncredited)
- The Runaway Bride (1930) - Mechanic (uncredited)
- Sunny Skies (1930) - Coach
- Dixiana (1930) - Blondell - Montague's Henchman (uncredited)
- Borrowed Wives (1930) - Police Sergeant
- Up the River (1930) - Guard (uncredited)
- Men on Call (1930) - Railroad Crewman (uncredited)
- The Last Parade (1931) - Recruit / Veteran (uncredited)
- Kept Husbands (1931) - Steelworker (uncredited)
- Beyond Victory (1931) - Lieutenant (uncredited)
- Born to Love (1931) - Captain Peters (uncredited)
- Shipmates (1931) - Sailor (uncredited)
- The Good Bad Girl (1931) - Taxicab Driver (uncredited)
- Young as You Feel (1931) - Death of a Faun Picket (uncredited)
- The Big Gamble (1931) - Red - Gangster Driver (uncredited)
- Platinum Blonde (1931) - Hank - a Reporter (uncredited)
- Bad Company (1931) - Leading Detective (uncredited)
- Th Deadline (1931) - Cattlemen's Association Detective (uncredited)
- The Beast of the City (1932) - Joel - Policeman Outside Car 47 (uncredited)
- Hell Fire Austin (1932) - Soldier (uncredited)
- Play Girl (1932) - Delivery Man (uncredited)
- Carnival Boat (1932) - Jordon
- Disorderly Conduct (1932) - Policeman (uncredited)
- High Speed (1932) - Steve Macey
- Night Court (1932) - Thug Beating Up Mike (uncredited)
- Lady and Gent (1932) - Ironton Fight Announcer (uncredited)
- American Madness (1932) - Kelly (uncredited)
- Strange Justice (1932) - Prison Guard (uncredited)
- Vanity Street (1932) - Taxi Driver (uncredited)
- I Am a Fugitive from a Chain Gang (1932) - Job Foreman (uncredited)
- You Said a Mouthful (1932) - Harbor Steward (uncredited)
- A Strange Adventure (1932) - Police Sgt. Kelly
- The Death Kiss (1932) - Studio Garage Attendant (uncredited)
- Frisco Jenny (1932) - Man Posting Earthquake Deaths (uncredited)
- Air Hostess (1933) - Mechanic (uncredited)
- Goldie Gets Along (1933) - Arresting Officer (uncredited)
- Terror Trail (1933) - Bartender (uncredited)
- State Trooper (1933) - Morgan
- What! No Beer? (1933) - Cop (uncredited)
- The Circus Queen Murder (1933) - Roustabout (uncredited)
- Supernatural (1933) - Taxi Driver (uncredited)
- Heroes for Sale (1933) - Henderson - Soldier (uncredited)
- Bed of Roses (1933) - River Boat Steward (uncredited)
- The Woman I Stole (1933) - Oil Worker (uncredited)
- Wild Boys of the Road (1933) - Brakeman Throwing Stones (uncredited)
- Fury of the Jungle (1933) - Molango Villager (uncredited)
- Hold the Press (1933) - Sereno's Tail (uncredited)
- East of Fifth Avenue (1933) - Tenement Resident (uncredited)
- Cross Country Cruise (1934) - Last Bus Driver (uncredited)
- Massacre (1934) - Deputy (uncredited)
- Madame Spy (1934) - Austrian Officer
- It Happened One Night (1934) - Bus Driver #2 (uncredited)
- House of Mystery (1934) - Detective Sawyer (uncredited)
- Voice in the Night (1934) - Henchman (uncredited)
- City Limits (1934) - Oliver's Thug (uncredited)
- Twentieth Century (1934) - Cameraman (uncredited)
- The Hell Cat (1934) - Scotty (uncredited)
- Midnight Alibi (1934) - Hummingbird Club Doorman (uncredited)
- Here Comes the Navy (1934) - Supply Sergeant (uncredited)
- Name the Woman (1934) - Chuck
- Beyond the Law (1934) - Express Guard
- Dames (1934) - Guard (uncredited)
- Girl in Danger (1934) - Police Sgt. Brady (uncredited)
- 6 Day Bike Rider (1934) - Second Officer (uncredited)
- Gentlemen Are Born (1934) - Police Officer (uncredited)
- Broadway Bill (1934) - Racetrack Onlooker (uncredited)
- The Silver Streak (1934) - Trainman (uncredited)
- Murder in the Clouds (1934) - Mechanic (uncredited)
- The Secret Bride (1934) - Bailiff (uncredited)
- The Best Man Wins (1935) - Eddie (uncredited)
- Maybe It's Love (1935) - Motor Cop Driver (uncredited)
- Square Shooter (1935) - Himself (uncredited)
- Red Hot Tires (1935) - Police Captain (uncredited)
- The Whole Town's Talking (1935) - Guard / Driver (uncredited)
- Car 99 (1935) - Trooper Haynes
- Living on Velvet (1935) - Policeman at Amusement Park (uncredited)
- Circumstantial Evidence (1935) - Prison Guard Henderson (uncredited)
- Black Fury (1935) - Security Policeman Stopping Anna (uncredited)
- Star of Midnight (1935) - Kinland Henchman (uncredited)
- The Desert Trail (1935) - Kansas Charlie posing as Rev. Harry Smith
- Mary Jane's Pa (1935) - Watkins - Turnkey (uncredited)
- Alias Mary Dow (1935) - Dance Hall Bouncer (uncredited)
- The Informer (1935) - House Patron (uncredited)
- Let 'Em Have It (1935) - Traffic Cop (uncredited)
- Alibi Ike (1935) - Detective (uncredited)
- Unknown Woman (1935) - Hank
- Spring Tonic (1935) - Policeman (uncredited)
- Front Page Woman (1935) - Policeman (uncredited)
- Man on the Flying Trapeze (1935) - Motorcycle Policeman (uncredited)
- Diamond Jim (1935) - Engineer (uncredited)
- Red Salute (1935) - Jailer (uncredited)
- Special Agent (1935) - Policeman (uncredited)
- The Goose and the Gander (1935) - Policeman at Jail (uncredited)
- His Night Out (1935) - Detective (uncredited)
- It's a Great Life (1935) - Assistant Leader (uncredited)
- The Case of the Lucky Legs (1935) - Policeman in Hotel (uncredited)
- The Case of the Missing Man (1935) - Steve's First Henchman (uncredited)
- Thanks a Million (1935) - Trooper (uncredited)
- Super-Speed (1935) - Joe (uncredited)
- Miss Pacific Fleet (1935) - Chief Petty Officer (uncredited)
- Too Tough to Kill (1935) - Joe (uncredited)
- Hitch Hike Lady (1935) - Chesty (uncredited)
- Magnificent Obsessio (1935) - Hugh - Mechanic (uncredited)
- The Lone Wolf Returns (1935) - Raid Detective (uncredited)
- The Bohemian Girl (1936) - Gypsy Vagabond (uncredited)
- Road Gang (1936) - Ed - Guard #1 (uncredited)
- Sutter's Gold (1936) - Rider / Messenger (uncredited)
- Boulder Dam (1936) - Bud - the Bouncer (uncredited)
- Show Boat (1936) - Gambler (uncredited)
- The Law in Her Hands (1936) - Detective at Fourth Trial (uncredited)
- Bullets or Ballots (1936) - Policeman (uncredited)
- And Sudden Death (1936) - Policeman Adams (uncredited)
- The Big Noise (1936) - Kerrigan, Policeman Investigating Bombing (uncredited)
- Public Enemy's Wife (1936) - G-Man (uncredited)
- Stage Struck (1936) - Heney
- The Luckiest Girl in the World (1936) - Policeman
- Two in a Crowd (1936) - Policeman (uncredited)
- Here Comes Carter (1936) - Detective Jim Henderson
- Polo Joe (1936) - Detective (uncredited)
- Wild Brian Kent (1936) - Jed - Henchman
- Stowaway (1936) - Seaman (uncredited)
- Great Guy (1936) - Meat Clerk (uncredited)
- We Who Are About to Die (1937) - Prison Guard Sergeant (uncredited)
- Smart Blonde (1937) - Det. Marsotto (uncredited)
- God's Country and the Woman (1937) - Logger (uncredited)
- Black Legion (1937) - Motorcycle Cop (uncredited)
- Green Light (1937) - Policeman (scenes deleted)
- Sea Devils (1937) - Seaman Announcing Emergency (uncredited)
- Love Is News (1937) - Cop (uncredited)
- Midnight Court (1937) - Eddie - the Detective (uncredited)
- The Man Who Found Himself (1937) - Train Switchman (uncredited)
- That Man's Here Again (1937) - Park Policeman (uncredited)
- Woman Chases Man (1937) - Policeman (uncredited)
- Draegerman Courage (1937) - Driller (uncredited)
- There Goes My Girl (1937) - Moran - Whelan's Strong Arm Man (uncredited)
- The Go Getter (1937) - First Man on Employment Line (uncredited)
- San Quentin (1937) - Guard (uncredited)
- Kid Galahad (1937) - Title Fight Announcer (uncredited)
- The Case of the Stuttering Bishop (1937) - Detective James Fleet (uncredited)
- The Singing Marine (1937) - Second Marine Sergeant
- Public Wedding (1937) - Detective (uncredited)
- Topper (1937) - Policeman (uncredited)
- Back in Circulation (1937) - Chief Officer at Train Wreck (uncredited)
- The Lady Fights Back (1937) - Workman (uncredited)
- Over the Goal (1937) - Police Sergeant Peters
- The Perfect Specimen (1937) - State Police Captain (uncredited)
- She Loved a Fireman (1937) - Tim Callahan
- Night Spot (1938) - Detective (uncredited)
- Penrod and His Twin Brother (1938) - Officer McCarthy (uncredited)
- Prison Nurse (1938) - Guard (uncredited)
- Over the Wall (1938) - Prison Keeper
- This Marriage Business (1938) - Policeman with Fingerprint Report (uncredited)
- Professor Beware (1938) - Construction Camp Boss (uncredited)
- Young Fugitives (1938) - Alfred (uncredited)
- Cowboy from Brooklyn (1938) - Brakeman (uncredited)
- The Shopworn Angel (1938) - Corporal (uncredited)
- Racket Busters (1938) - Truck Driver (uncredited)
- Four's a Crowd (1938) - Joe (uncredited)
- You Can't Take It with You (1938) - Plainclothes Policeman (uncredited)
- Valley of the Giants (1938) - Man Telling Andy About Foreigners (uncredited)
- Broadway Musketeers (1938) - First Detective at Murder Scene (uncredited)
- The Mad Miss Manton (1938) - Detective with Machine Gun (uncredited)
- There Goes My Heart (1938) - Diner Extra (uncredited)
- Strange Faces (1938) - Bartender (uncredited)
- Secrets of a Nurse (1938) - Detective Payne (uncredited)
- Peck's Bad Boy with the Circus (1938) - Jim - Circus Cop (uncredited)
- Going Places (1938) - Second Policeman (uncredited)
- They Made Me a Criminal (1939) - Detective #2 (uncredited)
- Blackwell's Island (1939) - Headkeeper Jameson (uncredited)
- Pirates of the Skies (1939) - Henchman Slug (uncredited)
- Torchy Blane in Chinatown (1939) - Captain McDonald
- You Can't Cheat an Honest Man (1939) - Highway Patrol Officer (uncredited)
- King of the Turf (1939) - Second Trainer
- Secret Service of the Air (1939) - Capt. King - Highway Patrol (uncredited)
- You Can't Get Away with Murder (1939) - Attacked Keeper (uncredited)
- Let Us Live (1939) - Detective with First Cab Driver (uncredited)
- The Man Who Dared (1939) - Police Sergeant (uncredited)
- Buck Rogers (1939, Serial) - Braeden - Captain of Dirigible [Ch. 1] (uncredited)
- The Kid from Texas (1939) - Yacht Captain Babcock (uncredited)
- Code of the Streets (1939) - Second Guard
- For Love or Money (1939) - John
- Rose of Washington Square (1939) - Cop (uncredited)
- The Kid from Kokomo (1939) - Policeman in Court (uncredited)
- They All Come Out (1939) - Chris (uncredited)
- Indianapolis Speedway (1939) - Racetrack Official (uncredited)
- Waterfront (1939) - Dance Official (uncredited)
- I Stole a Million (1939) - Baggage Car Guard (uncredited)
- The Angels Wash Their Faces (1939) - Policeman at Fire (uncredited)
- Blackmail (1939) - Boss Brown - Prisoner (uncredited)
- Dust Be My Destiny (1939) - Second Detective (uncredited)
- Rio (1939) - Convict (uncredited)
- Mr. Smith Goes to Washington (1939) - Reporter (uncredited)
- The Roaring Twenties (1939) - Second Detective
- One Hour to Live (1939) - Petrie
- Nick Carter, Master Detective (1939) - Joe - Blueprint Security Officer (uncredited)
- Gone with the Wind (1939) - Sergeant at hospital (uncredited)
- Slightly Honorable (1939) - O'Leary, the Cop
- Invisible Stripes (1939) - Police Driver (uncredited)
- Brother Rat and a Baby (1940) - Bus Driver (uncredited)
- Danger on Wheels (1940) - Police Officer (uncredited)
- Young Tom Edison (1940) - Mr. Briggs (uncredited)
- Castle on the Hudson (1940) - Intake Guard (uncredited)
- Framed (1940) - Cop (uncredited)
- Double Alibi (1940) - Patrolman Harrigan
- It All Came True (1940) - Danny - Detective (uncredited)
- Buck Benny Rides Again (1940) - Cowhand #1 (uncredited)
- I Can't Give You Anything But Love, Baby (1940) - Hogan (uncredited)
- Girl in 313 (1940) - Cop
- Love, Honor and Oh-Baby! (1940) - Motor Cop
- A Fugitive from Justice (1940) - Gray
- Black Diamonds (1940) - Ed, Mine Guard (uncredited)
- They Drive by Night (1940) - Driver (uncredited)
- Money and the Woman (1940) - Detective (uncredited)
- Flowing Gold (1940) - Truck Driver (uncredited)
- Knute Rockne All American (1940) - Worker (scenes deleted)
- East River (1940) - Railroad Detective (uncredited)
- Murder Over New York (1940) - Lefty - the Cop (uncredited)
- Santa Fe Trail (1940) - Armory Guard (uncredited)
- Behind the News (1940) - Thug (uncredited)
- Four Mothers (1941) - Mover (uncredited)
- High Sierra (1941) - Policeman at Auto Accident (uncredited)
- Flight from Destiny (1941) - Eddy - Head Keeper (uncredited)
- The Strawberry Blonde (1941) - Streetcleaner (uncredited)
- Topper Returns (1941) - Jim - Police Sergeant (uncredited)
- Horror Island (1941) - Police Officer (uncredited)
- Knockout (1941) - Fiske Fight Ring Announcer (uncredited)
- Strange Alibi (1941) - Quist - Prison Guard (uncredited)
- Adventure in Washington (1941) - Policeman (uncredited)
- The Get-Away (1941) - Bus Driver (uncredited)
- The Big Store (1941) - Policeman (uncredited)
- Two in a Taxi (1941) - Motorcycle Policeman (uncredited)
- The Bride Came C.O.D. (1941) - Policeman - Driver of Car #64 (uncredited)
- Hurricane Smith (1941) - Guard on Train (uncredited)
- Ringside Maisie (1941) - Policeman on Bridge (uncredited)
- Manpower (1941) - Detective in Raid (uncredited)
- Of Pups and Puzzles (1941, Short) - Foreman (uncredited)
- Nine Lives Are Not Enough (1941) - Policeman at Charles' Apartment (uncredited)
- Mob Town (1941) - Cop (uncredited)
- The Body Disappears (1941) - Police Desk Sergeant (uncredited)
- Among the Living (1941) - Motorcycle Cop (uncredited)
- Mr. District Attorney in the Carter Case (1941) - Police Sergeant (uncredited)
- You're in the Army Now (1941) - Older Officer (uncredited)
- Design for Scandal (1941) - Second Arresting Detective (uncredited)
- Ball of Fire (1941) - Cop on Garbage Truck (uncredited)
- The Man Who Came to Dinner (1942) - Guard (uncredited)
- All Through the Night (1942) - Police Sergeant (uncredited)
- Blondie Goes to College (1942) - First Motorcycle Policeman (uncredited)
- A Yank on the Burma Road (1942) - Police Desk Sergeant Mulvaney (uncredited)
- Frisco Lil (1942) - Officer Jones (uncredited)
- Born to Sing (1942) - Motor Cop (uncredited)
- Sleepytime Gal (1942) - Doorman (uncredited)
- The Strange Case of Doctor Rx (1942) - Cop Outside Church's Apartment (uncredited)
- I Was Framed (1942) - Arresting Policeman at Accident (uncredited)
- Kid Glove Killer (1942) - Rosson - Detective Grilling Eddie (uncredited)
- Fingers at the Window (1942) - Bill - Mounted Policeman (uncredited)
- Larceny, Inc. (1942) - Prison Tower Guard (uncredited)
- You're Telling Me (1942) - Policeman (uncredited)
- In This Our Life (1942) - Policeman Fallon (uncredited)
- This Gun for Hire (1942) - Demolition Foreman (uncredited)
- Tarzan's New York Adventure (1942) - Bailiff (uncredited)
- Ten Gentlemen from West Point (1942) - Bombardier (uncredited)
- The Big Shot (1942) - Leo, Policeman with Tim (uncredited)
- Lady in a Jam (1942) - Waiter (uncredited)
- Sweater Girl (1942) - Plainclothesman (uncredited)
- The Pride of the Yankees (1942) - Motorcycle Cop #2 (uncredited)
- The Falcon's Brother (1942) - Ship's Captain (uncredited)
- Eyes of the Underworld (1942) - Kelly - Policeman (uncredited)
- I Married a Witch (1942) - Motorcycle Cop (uncredited)
- Secrets of the Underground (1942) - Dan the Detective (uncredited)
- The Hard Way (1943) - Police Officer on Dock (uncredited)
- The Powers Girl (1943) - Police Officer (uncredited)
- Reveille with Beverly (1943) - Top Sergeant (uncredited)
- After Midnight with Boston Blackie (1943) - Police Captain (uncredited)
- Taxi, Mister (1943) - Policeman (uncredited)
- She Has What It Takes (1943) - Cop (uncredited)
- The Ghost and the Guest (1943) - Policeman Herbie
- A Stranger in Town (1943) - Policeman at Hearing (uncredited)
- Action in the North Atlantic (1943) - Seaman (uncredited)
- False Faces (1943) - Stake-Out Detective at Apartment Building (uncredited)
- Pilot No. 5 (1943) - Head Deputy at Pritchards' Farm (uncredited)
- Good Luck, Mr. Yates (1943) - Joe - Riveter (uncredited)
- Hers to Hold (1943) - Reporter (uncredited)
- Destroyer (1943) - Chief Gunner's Mate (uncredited)
- Sleepy Lagoon (1943) - Ticket Seller
- Swing Shift Maisie (1943) - Security Officer (uncredited)
- The Chance of a Lifetime (1943) - Policeman Frank (uncredited)
- In Old Oklahoma (1943) - McCann - Gardner's Oil Man (uncredited)
- True to Life (1943) - Subway Guard (uncredited)
- Charlie Chan in the Secret Service (1944) - Lewis
- It Happened Tomorrow (1944) - Policeman at Bridge (uncredited)
- Henry Aldrich's Little Secret (1944) - Policeman (uncredited)
- Sensations of 1945 (1944) - Cop (uncredited)
- Louisiana Hayride (1944) - Plainclothesman (uncredited)
- Return of the Ape Man (1944) - Sergeant
- Call of the Jungle (1944) - Boggs
- The Last Ride (1944) - Police Desk Sgt. (uncredited)
- The Woman in the Window (1944) - Police Driver (uncredited)
- Belle of the Yukon (1944) - Messenger (uncredited)
- Youth on Trial (1945) - Policeman (uncredited)
- The Clock (1945) - Subway Guard (uncredited)
- A Medal for Benny (1945) - Bank Guard (uncredited)
- Pillow to Post (1945) - Oil Well Foreman (uncredited)
- Captain Eddie (1945) - Policeman (uncredited)
- Captain Tugboat Annie (1945) - Motor Cop
- The Beautiful Cheat (1945) - Policeman (uncredited)
- That Night with You (1945) - Doorman (uncredited)
- Captain Tugboat Annie (1945) - Motor Cop
- The Notorious Lone Wolf (1946) - House Detective (uncredited)
- Deadline at Dawn (1946) - Policeman (uncredited)
- Night Editor (1946) - Dickstein (uncredited)
- Mysterious Intruder (1946) - Cop in Squad Car (uncredited)
- Her Kind of Man (1946) - Police Announcer (uncredited)
- Black Angel (1946) - Police Sergeant (uncredited)
- Love Laughs at Andy Hardy (1946) - Expressman (uncredited)
- The Mighty McGurk (1947) - Singer (uncredited)
- California (1947) - (uncredited)
- My Brother Talks to Horses (1947) - Police Officer Johnson (uncredited)
- Easy Come, Easy Go (1947) - Plainclothesman (uncredited)
- Nora Prentiss (1947) - Detective (uncredited)
- Sport of Kings (1947) - Announcer (uncredited)
- Brute Force (1947) - Chappie - Guard in Auto Shop (uncredited)
- Something in the Wind (1947) - Radio Station Policeman (uncredited)
- The Secret Life of Walter Mitty (1947) - P.O. Cowboy (uncredited)
- Where There's Life (1947) - New York Police Officer at Consulate (uncredited)
