= Henry Otho =

American actor (1888–1940)

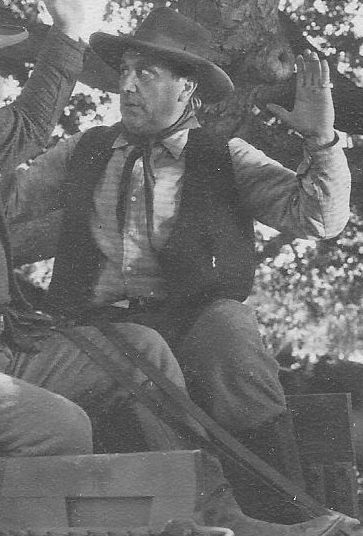
- Henry Otho in Trailin' West (1936)
- Born: February 6, 1888; New York City
- Died: June 6, 1940 (aged 52); San Bernardino, California
- Occupation: Actor

Henry Otho (February 6, 1888 – June 6, 1940) was an American actor. He has worked in The Big Stampede (1932), Mary Stevens (1933), Hard to Handle (1933), The Mayor of Hell (1933), Baby Face (1933), Mandalay (1934), Wonder Bar (1934), Stranded (1935), My Bill (1938), The Fighting Devil Dogs (1938), Overland Stage Raiders (1938), Each Dawn I Die (1939).

== Selected filmography ==
- Her Majesty, Love (1931) as Train Conductor (uncredited)
- Manhattan Parade (1931) as Deputy with Sheriff (uncredited)
- The Beast of the City (1932) as Detective (uncredited)
- Fireman, Save My Child (1932) as Lem (uncredited)
- Miss Pinkerton (1932) as Car 48 Officer (uncredited)
- The Dark Horse (1932) as Delegate Spreading the Word (uncredited)
- Love Is a Racket (1932) as Police Sergeant in Eddie's Apartment (uncredited)
- The Purchase Price (1932) as Extra in Beer Hall and at Shivaree (uncredited)
- Big City Blues (1932) as Subway Guide (uncredited)
- Tiger Shark (1932) as Crewman (uncredited)
- The Big Stampede (1932) as Crew's Henchman (uncredited)
- The Conquerors (1932) as Slade – Outlaw Shooting Roger (uncredited)
- Lawyer Man (1932) as Hoodlum with Gilmurry (uncredited)
- Frisco Jenny (1932) as Charley in Bar / Man Pinched on Bridge (uncredited)
- Hard to Handle (1933) as Dance Worker Owed Three Weeks' Wages (uncredited)
- Heroes for Sale (1933) as Policeman Phoning for Riot Squad (uncredited)
- The Mayor of Hell (1933) as Guard in School Armory (uncredited)
- Baby Face (1933) as Laborer (uncredited)
- Mary Stevens, M.D. (1933) as Fireman (uncredited)
- The Devil's Mate (1933) as Witness (uncredited)
- Penthouse (1933) as Crelliman's Henchman (uncredited)
- Ever in My Heart (1933) as Soldier (uncredited)
- Female (1933) as Shooting Gallery Onlooker (uncredited)
- Lady Killer (1933) as Movie Guard Decked by Dan (uncredited)
- Mandalay (1934) as Second Sergeant (uncredited)
- Wonder Bar (1934) as Second Bartender (uncredited)
- Gambling Lady (1934) as Lang's Associate at Racetrack (uncredited)
- House of Mystery (1934) as Mr. Gage (uncredited)
- Harold Teen (1934) as Stagehand (uncredited)
- Upper World (1934) as Cop (scenes deleted)
- Smarty (1934) as Bartender (uncredited)
- The Thin Man (1934) as Detective Waiter (uncredited)
- Fog Over Frisco (1934) as Man in Mayard's Office (uncredited)
- Here Comes the Navy (1934) as Man at Dance (uncredited)
- Friends of Mr. Sweeney (1934) as Fireman (uncredited)
- The Man with Two Faces (1934) as Policeman in Martha's House (uncredited)
- The Dragon Murder Case (1934) as Detective in Diving Suit (uncredited)
- Kansas City Princess (1934) as Policeman (uncredited)
- The Case of the Howling Dog (1934) as Bailiff (uncredited)
- Happiness Ahead (1934) as Window Washer (uncredited)
- 6 Day Bike Rider (1934) as Harry's Trainer (uncredited)
- I Sell Anything (1934) as Spectator Bidding $4.50 (uncredited)
- Murder in the Clouds (1934) as Secret Service Escort (uncredited)
- Buried Loot (1935, Short) as Cell Guard (uncredited)
- Devil Dogs of the Air (1935) as Ground Crewman (uncredited)
- While the Patient Slept (1935) as Frank – Detective (uncredited)
- Times Square Lady (1935) as Hockey Trainer (uncredited)
- Black Fury (1935) as Locked-Out Miner (uncredited)
- Dinky (1935) as Joe- Policeman (uncredited)
- Stranded (1935) as Bridge Worker (uncredited)
- Front Page Woman (1935) as Policeman (uncredited)
- Broadway Gondolier (1935) as Pete (uncredited)
- Diamond Jim (1935) as Mug (uncredited)
- Red Salute (1935) as Border Patrolman (uncredited)
- Keystone Hotel (1935, Short) as Tough Mug (uncredited)
- Dr. Socrates (1935) as Gangster (uncredited)
- Captain Blood (1935) as David Sampson – Pirate (uncredited)
- The Murder of Dr. Harrigan (1936) as Martin's Detective Escort (uncredited)
- Road Gang (1936) as Guard in Blackfoot Mine (uncredited)
- Treachery Rides the Range (1936) as Burley Barton
- Sons o' Guns (1936) as Apache Dancer (uncredited)
- Murder by an Aristocrat (1936) as Sheriff Frank Whiting
- Earthworm Tractors (1936) as Road Worker (uncredited)
- Jailbreak (1936) as Guard Murray (uncredited)
- Love Begins at Twenty (1936) as Lumpy – Bank Robber
- Trailin' West (1936) as Hawk – Henchman
- Two in a Crowd (1936) as Policeman (uncredited)
- Banjo on My Knee (1936) as Policeman (uncredited)
- Smart Blonde (1937) as Cop Guarding Room (uncredited)
- Guns of the Pecos (1937) as Hank Brady – Blake's Henchman
- God's Country and the Woman (1937) as Logger (uncredited)
- The Holy Terror (1937) as Master at Arms (uncredited)
- Nancy Steele Is Missing! (1937) as Guard (uncredited)
- Midnight Court (1937) as Mechanic (uncredited)
- Land Beyond the Law (1937) as Kirby
- It Happened Out West (1937) as Hank – Henchman
- Draegerman Courage (1937) as Gene – Rescue Worker (uncredited)
- Blazing Sixes (1937) as Chuck – Hess Henchman
- Slim (1937) as Mitch
- Ever Since Eve (1937) as Bandit (uncredited)
- Born Reckless (1937) as Detective (uncredited)
- The Singing Marine (1937) as Marine (uncredited)
- Empty Holsters (1937) as Charlie – Ace's Henchman
- SOS Coast Guard (1937) as S.S.'Carfax Mate (uncredited)
- Prairie Thunder (1937) as Chris
- Charlie Chan on Broadway (1937) as Detective (uncredited)
- Back in Circulation (1937) as Eddie Nelson – Door Repairman (uncredited)
- Alcatraz Island (1937) as Metal Detector Guard (uncredited)
- The Adventurous Blonde (1937) as Reilly (uncredited)
- Clipped Wings (1937) as Sgt. Phalen
- Sh! The Octopus (1937) as Sinister Plotter (uncredited)
- Sergeant Murphy (1938) as Cavalryman (uncredited)
- The Invisible Menace (1938) as Boat Loading Announcer (uncredited)
- The Kid Comes Back (1938) as Handler in Conway's Corner (uncredited)
- Over the Wall (1938) as Bruiser in Pinball Room (uncredited)
- Island in the Sky (1938) as Prison Guard (uncredited)
- The Fighting Devil Dogs (1938) as Sam Hedges, the Gardener
- My Bill (1938) as Jake – Piano Mover (uncredited)
- Pride of the West (1938) as Henchman Saunders' Short Partner (uncredited)
- Gateway (1938) as Guard (uncredited)
- Dick Tracy Returns (1938) as Mid City Garage Mechanic (uncredited)
- Valley of the Giants (1938) as Man Telling Fats About Ship (uncredited)
- Overland Stage Raiders (1938) as Sheriff Mason
- Devil's Island (1939) as Guard Handcuffing Pierre (uncredited)
- Blackwell's Island (1939) as Guard (uncredited)
- The Lone Ranger Rides Again (1939, Serial) as Pa Daniels
- Secret Service of the Air (1939) as The Turnkey (uncredited)
- Mexicali Rose (1939) as The Alcade
- Dodge City (1939) as Conductor (uncredited)
- Each Dawn I Die (1939) as Guard in Warden's Office (uncredited) (final film role)

== Bibliography ==
- Da Silva, George Batista (June 4, 2010). Os Filmes De John Wayne. Clube de Autores. p. 150.
- Kear, Lynn; Rossman, John (March 30, 2016). The Complete Kay Francis Career Record: All Film, Stage, Radio and Television Appearances. McFarland Publishing. p. 295. ISBN 9781476602875.
- Neibaur, James L. (October 3, 2014). James Cagney Films of the 1930s. Rowman & Littlefield. p. 228. ISBN 9781442242203.
