= Red Hot Tires (1935 film) =

1935 film by D. Ross Lederman

- Directed by: D. Ross Lederman
- Written by: Dore Schary (additional dialogue)
- Screenplay by: Tristram Tupper
- Story by: Tristram Tupper
- Produced by: Sam Bischoff
- Starring: Lyle Talbot; Mary Astor
- Cinematography: Arthur L. Todd; Warren Lynch
- Edited by: Frank Magee
- Music by: Leo F. Forbstein
- Production company: Warner Bros. Pictures
- Distributed by: Warner Bros. Pictures
- Release date: February 2, 1935
- Running time: 61 minutes
- Country: United States
- Language: English

Red Hot Tires is a 1935 American crime drama film produced and distributed by Warner Bros. Pictures, directed by D. Ross Lederman, and starring Lyle Talbot and Mary Astor. The plot involves a racing driver (Talbot) falsely accused of murdering a rival driver during a race and his friends' attempts to prove his innocence.

== Plot ==
Auto racing teammates Wally and Robert compete for the romantic attentions of a sponsor's daughter. Their intense rivalry turns tragic when their in-race wheel lock-up result in Robert's death and nets Wally a homicide conviction.

== Cast ==
- Lyle Talbot as Wallace Storm
- Mary Astor as Patricia Sanford
- Roscoe Karns as Bud Keene
- Frankie Darro as Johnny
- Gavin Gordon as Robert Griffin
- Mary Treen as Maggie
- Henry Kolker as Martin Sanford
- Bradley Page as Curley Taylor
- Arthur Aylesworth as Race Judge Hanson
- Howard C. Hickman as Judge Alcott
- Clarence Muse as Bud's truck partner

== Preservation status ==
A print of the film is preserved at the Library of Congress.

== External list ==
- Red Hot Tires at IMDb
- Red Hot Tires at the TCM Movie Database (archived)
- Red Hot Tires at the AFI Catalog of Feature Films
- pressbook cover(archived)
