= Mary Maguire =

Australian-born actress (1919–1974)

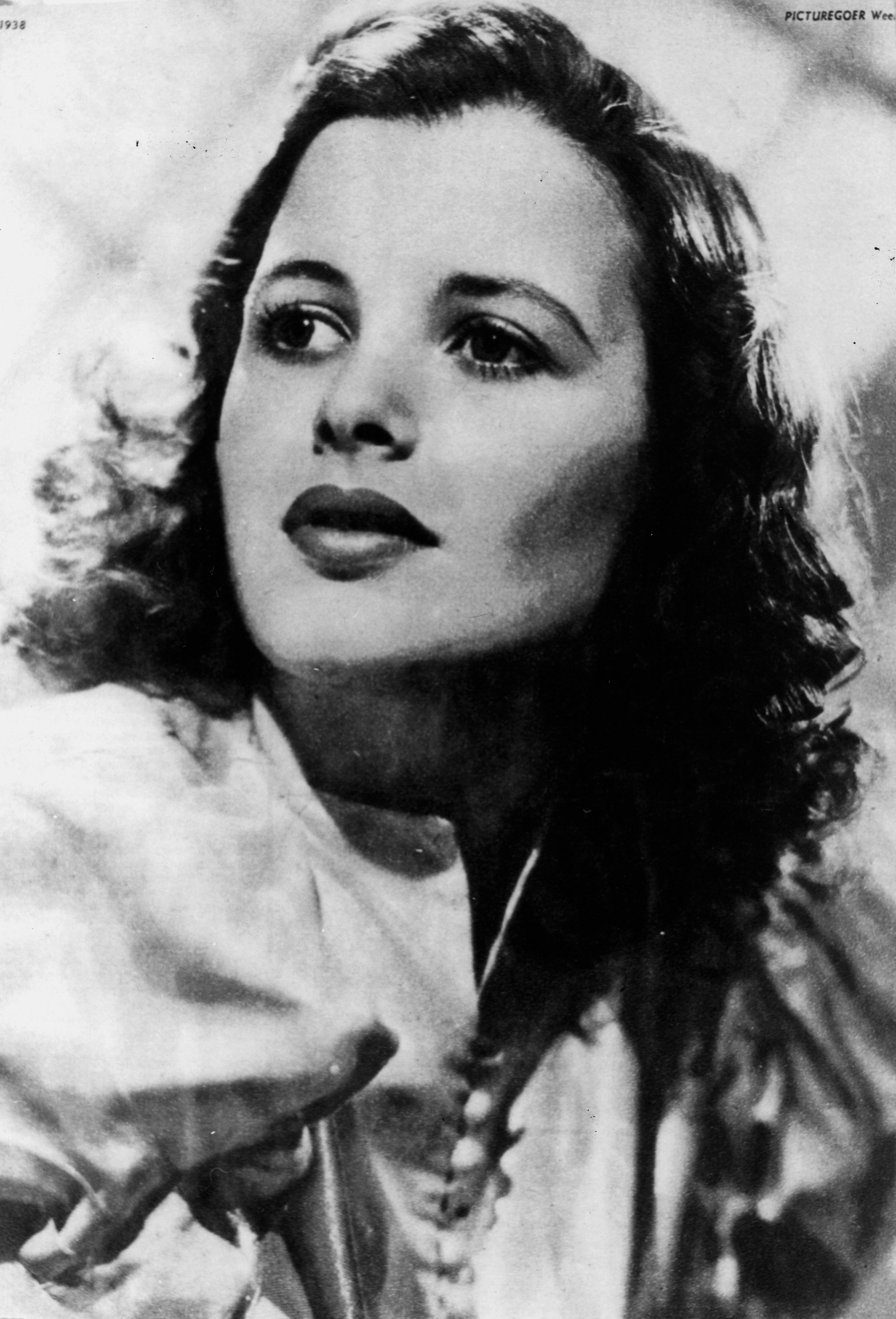
- Mary Maguire, c. 1937
- Born: Ellen Theresa Maguire; 22 February 1919; Melbourne, Australia
- Died: 18 May 1974 (aged 55); Long Beach, California, U.S.
- Occupation: Actress
- Years active: 1935–1942
- Spouses: Robert Gordon-Canning (m. 1940; div. 1944) Philip Henry Legarra (m. 1945; died 1971)
- Children: 1
- Father: Michael Maguire

Ellen Theresa Maguire (22 February 1919 – 18 May 1974), known by her stage name Mary Maguire, was an Australian-born actress who briefly became a Hollywood and British film star in the late 1930s.

== Early life ==
Maguire was born in Melbourne, Australia, to Michael "Mickey" Maguire, footballer, racehorse owner, hotel proprietor, and former welterweight boxer and Mary Jane Maguire (née Carroll). Nicknamed "Peggy" by the family, she was the second of five sisters. She grew up in Melbourne and Brisbane, her father managing the famous "Bull and Mouth Hotel" in Bourke Street, Melbourne, and later the iconic Bellevue Hotel, Brisbane. In Melbourne she attended the Academy of Mary Immaculate in Fitzroy.

== Career ==
Maguire began acting when she was cast in the film Heritage by director Charles Chauvel at the age of 16. Elsa Chauvel wrote in her 1973 memoirs: "This lovely child was brought to our notice by a Brisbane publicity man... fresh from a Queensland convent." Changing her name to Mary, Maguire then starred in The Flying Doctor, an Australian British co-production that was filmed in Australia by director Miles Mander and also starred American actor Charles Farrell.

=== Hollywood 1936–1938 ===
With encouragement from Miles Mander, Maguire and her family moved to Hollywood in September 1936. Mander gave her an introduction to fellow Australian expat John Farrow, who arranged for an interview with a casting director that led to a contract with Warner Bros.

Maguire made her U.S. debut in the B movie That Man's Here Again with comedian Hugh Herbert, followed by Confession with Kay Francis and Ian Hunter, Alcatraz Island with Ann Sheridan and John Litel, and Sergeant Murphy with Ronald Reagan.

In February 1938, she left Warners for 20th Century Fox. Reports said she was seen in the company of 20th Century Fox executive Joe Schenck, who "believed in her career."

=== Britain ===
In 1938, after appearing in Mysterious Mr. Moto, she moved to Great Britain, where she appeared in a number of films, including Keep Smiling, a Gracie Fields comedy. As one of only a handful of Australian actors working internationally in film at the time, her career attracted considerable attention from Australian newspapers between 1936 and 1946.

Maguire's reasons for leaving Hollywood in 1938 are unclear. There is some evidence that she had originally intended to travel to Britain in 1936. On the other hand, in November 1937 a newspaper reported she had "mutinied" and been temporarily removed from Warner Brothers' payroll because she wanted dramatic roles rather than ingénue roles. Subsequently, she starred in British dramas such as The Outsider opposite George Sanders, Black Eyes, opposite Otto Kruger, An Englishman's Home with Edmund Gwenn and This Was Paris with Ann Dvorak.

== Personal life ==
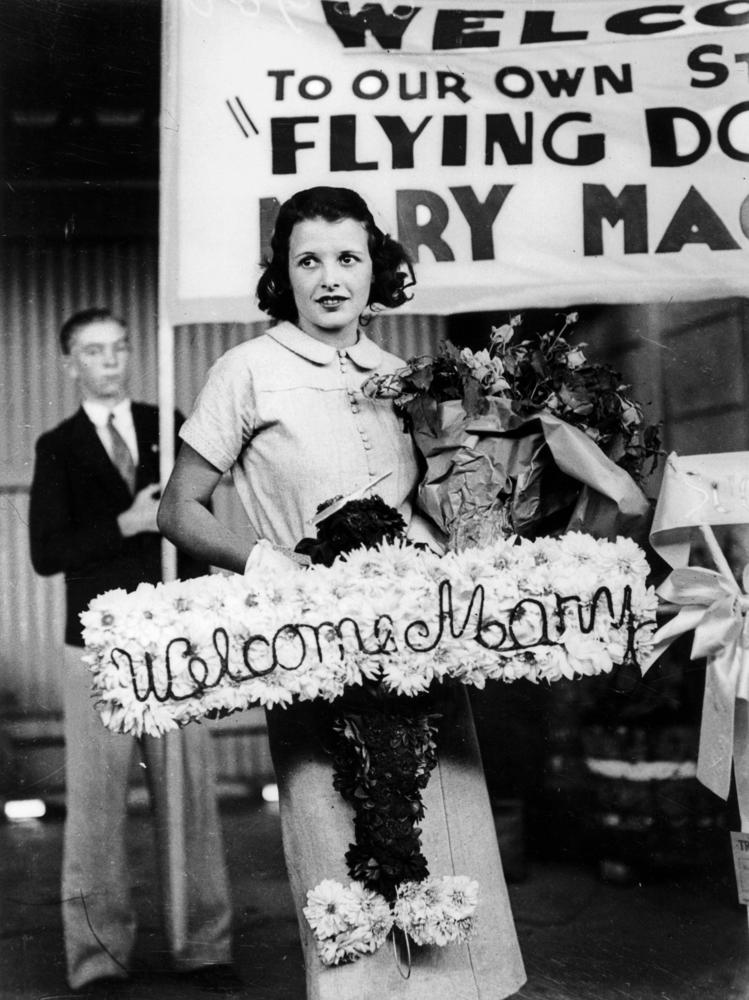
Maguire being welcomed home at Brisbane, 1936

In mid 1939, she announced her engagement to Robert Gordon-Canning MC, a First World War veteran thirty years her senior. He had been active in far-right British politics, including the British Union of Fascists and The Link. When their engagement was announced, Maguire felt the need to publicly disassociate herself from Gordon-Canning's political views and anti-Semitism. In July 1939, she told a journalist from The Australian Women's Weekly: "I have no Fascist sympathies... and do not intend to take part in my fiancé's political life... I was given my big chance in Hollywood where there are many Jews. It would be both ungrateful and unkind of me to ally myself because of marriage with the Fascist Party." They married in August 1939, attracting great publicity, partly because she was carried to the wedding in an invalid chair, supposedly with a broken ankle. Several years later, she revealed that she had been suffering tuberculosis at the time of the wedding. Her sickness, which she characterized as "a wonky lung", was attributed to "exposure to inclement weather in Hollywood".

Ironically, amongst his previous fascist publications, Gordon-Canning had written disparagingly of the influence and tone of Hollywood films. Although he was interned in July 1940, and she was still ill, a son, Michael Robert, was born in February 1941; he died in early 1942. Maguire's last film was This Was Paris, made in 1942 in England, a story of the activities of fifth columnists in Paris before its fall. She and Gordon-Canning divorced in 1944, and Maguire described the marriage as a "closed chapter" in her life. She attempted to restart her Hollywood career, but although still aged only 26, her efforts were to no avail.

Her second marriage was to Philip Henry Legarra, a U.S. engineer, who had been sent to Britain to promote the Mustang fighter plane.

She died at Long Beach, California, in 1974 of acute alcoholism.

In 2019, Michael Adams published a biography of Maguire, Australia's Sweetheart: The Amazing Story of Forgotten Hollywood Star Mary Maguire.

== The marrying Maguires ==
Elsa Chauvel claimed the Maguire sisters were known as "The Marrying Maguires" because they took "London by storm" when they arrived there, making "spectacular marriages". The oldest Maguire girl, Patricia, married Peter Rudyard Aitken, the son of Lord Beaverbrook, and was the mother of the current 6th Baronet Green of Wakefield. The third Maguire daughter, Joan, acted on stage in London under the name Joan Shannon. Carmel Maguire married John Wodehouse, 4th Earl of Kimberley, and was the mother of the current Earl. The youngest of the girls, "Lupe" (actually christened Mary), married British hire car "king" Godfrey Davis, also having appeared in a minor part in The Man in Grey (1943).

== Filmography ==
Year	Title	Role	Notes
1933	Diggers in Blighty	Minor Role	
1935	Heritage	Biddy O'Shea / Biddy Parry	
1936	The Flying Doctor	Jenny Rutherford	
1937	That Man's Here Again	Nancy Lee	
1937	Confession	Hildegard	
1937	Alcatraz Island	Annabel Sloane aka Ann Brady	
1938	Sergeant Murphy	Mary Lou Carruthers	
1938	Mysterious Mr. Moto	Ann Richman	
1938	Keep Smiling	Avis Maguire	
1939	The Outsider	Lalage Sturdee	
1939	Black Eyes	Tanya Petroff	
1940	An Englishman's Home	Betty Brown	
1942	This Was Paris	Blossom Leroy – Butch's Girlfriend	(final film role)
