= Carlyle Moore Jr. =

American actor (1909–1977)

Carlyle Moore Jr. (January 5, 1909 – March 3, 1977) was an American actor who appeared in films and, like his father, wrote plays.

== Early life ==
Carlyle Moore Jr. was born in New York City in 1909. His father, Carlyle Moore Sr., was a playwright whose work included the play that provided the basis for the 1915 film Stop Thief!. Moore became a licensed private pilot at age 17.

== Career ==
He was the office boy in the 1927 show Ink. He received positive notice for his role in the 1936 film Road Gang.

In addition to acting, he also wrote plays.

In 1937, Moore married actress Jane Fenmore Barnes. He died in 1977.

== Partial filmography ==
- What a Man (1930)
- Tomorrow's Children (1934)
- Together We Live (1935)
- Murder in the Fleet (1935)
- Give Me Liberty (1936)
- Road Gang (1936)
- Bengal Tiger (1936)
- Melody for Two (1937)
- Arizona Legion (1939)
- Secret Service of the Air (1939) as Radio operator
- Flight Angels (1940) as Radio operator
- Murder in the Air (1940) as Sunnyvale radio operator
- Brother Rat and a Baby (1940) as Lieutenant
- A Child is Born (1940) as Intern
- Knute Rockne - All American (1940), as player
