= Your Uncle Dudley =

1935 film by James Tinling, Eugene Forde

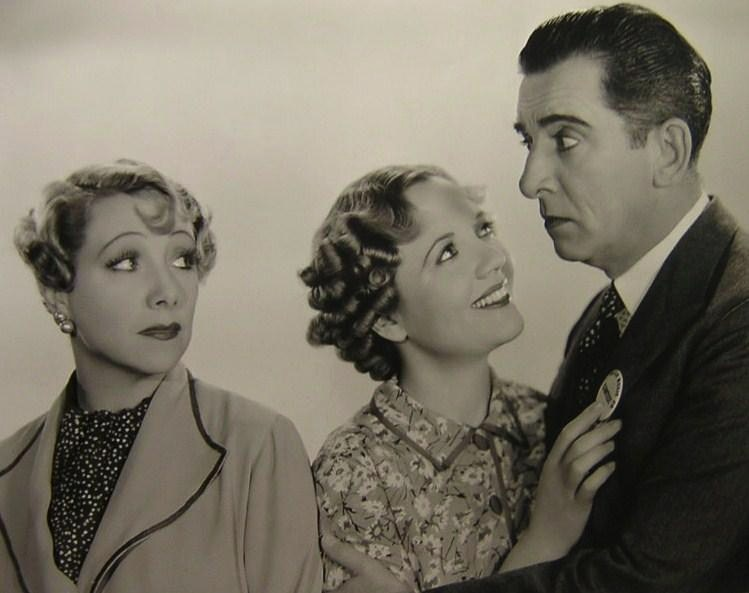
- Marjorie Gateson, Lois Wilson, and Edward Everett Horton in Your Uncle Dudley
- Directed by: Eugene Forde
- Screenplay by: Allen Birkin; Joseph Hoffman; Dore Schary
- Story by: Howard Lindsay; Bertrand Robinson
- Produced by: Edward T. Lowe, Jr.
- Starring: Edward Everett Horton; Lois Wilson; John McGuire; Rosina Lawrence; Alan Dinehart; Marjorie Gateson
- Cinematography: Harry Jackson
- Edited by: Louis R. Loeffler
- Production company: 20th Century-Fox
- Distributed by: 20th Century-Fox
- Release date: December 13, 1935
- Running time: 70 minutes
- Country: United States
- Language: English

Your Uncle Dudley is a 1935 American comedy film directed by Eugene Forde and written by Allen Birkin, Joseph Hoffman and Dore Schary. The film stars Edward Everett Horton, Lois Wilson, John McGuire, Rosina Lawrence, Alan Dinehart and Marjorie Gateson. It was released on December 13, 1935, by 20th Century-Fox.

== Cast ==
- Edward Everett Horton as Dudley Dixon
- Lois Wilson as Christine Saunders
- John McGuire as Robert Kirby
- Rosina Lawrence as Ethel Church
- Alan Dinehart as Charlie Post
- Marjorie Gateson as Mabel Dixon
- William "Billy" Benedict as Cyril Church
- Florence Roberts as Janet Dixon
- Jane Barnes as Marjorie Baxter
