= Declaration of Independence (film) =

1938 film by Crane Wilbur

- Directed by: Crane Wilbur
- Written by: Thomas Jefferson
- Screenplay by: Charles L. Tedford
- Produced by: John Nesbitt
- Starring: John Litel; Ted Osborne; Rosella Towne
- Narrated by: Charles Frederick Lindsley
- Cinematography: W. Howard Greene
- Edited by: Everett Dodd
- Music by: Howard Jackson
- Production company: The Vitaphone Corporation
- Distributed by: Warner Bros. Pictures
- Release date: November 26, 1938
- Running time: 17 minutes
- Country: United States
- Language: English

Declaration of Independence is a 1938 American short drama film directed by Crane Wilbur. The film, which depicts the 1776 adoption by the Second Continental Congress of the Lee Resolution and the United States Declaration of Independence, won an Academy Award at the 11th Academy Awards in 1939 for Best Short Subject (Two-Reel), and has been credited as being one of the few films relating to the American Revolution to win this award.

Declaration of Independence was part of Warner Bros. Pictures' Old Glory series, which consisted of several short films that covered American history.

== Plot ==
In 1776, John Hancock, president of the Second Continental Congress, summons delegates from the Thirteen Colonies to arrive in Philadelphia. On June 7, Thomas Jefferson, a delegate from Virginia, reads a letter from General George Washington that he supports independence from the British Empire. Richard Henry Lee, another delegate from Virginia, proposes to adopt a resolution to declare the colonies as "free and independent States". Lee's resolution is opposed by a few delegates, including John Dickinson, while other delegates, including Benjamin Franklin, vote in favor.

Jefferson is assigned to write the Declaration of Independence, while Franklin and John Adams advise. While Franklin praises an early draft, Adams insists on removing the anti-slavery clause Jefferson has written to improve the chances for a unanimous adoption. Franklin agrees, and Jefferson removes the clause.

Elsewhere, Caesar Rodney, a delegate from Delaware, leaves the Continental Congress to investigate Loyalist activity back home. He also arrives at the mansion of Matthew Kramer, a local leader of the Loyalists and father of Rodney's fiancé Betsy Kramer. Opposing American independence, Kramer forbids Rodney to marry Betsy.

Rodney is notified he is needed back in Philadelphia to break a tie in Delaware's delegation in favor of independence. Kramer and his Loyalist allies become determine to stop Rodney from returning. With help from a local neighbor, Rodney rides on horseback to Philadelphia and breaks the tie. On July 4, the Declaration of Independence is adopted and signed.

== Cast ==
- John Litel as Thomas Jefferson
- Ted Osborne as Caesar Rodney
- Rosella Towne as Betsy Kramer
- Richard Bond as Thomas Lynch Jr.
- Owen King as Edward Rutledge
- Henry Hall as John Hancock
- Walter Walker as Benjamin Franklin
- Ferris Taylor as John Adams
- Tom Chatterton as Richard Henry Lee (uncredited)

== See also ==
- List of films about the American Revolution
- Committee of Five
