= Land Beyond the Law =

1937 film by B. Reeves Eason

- Theatrical release poster
- Directed by: B. Reeves Eason
- Screenplay by: Luci Ward; Joseph K. Watson
- Produced by: Bryan Foy
- Starring: Dick Foran; Linda Perry; Wayne Morris; Harry Woods; Irene Franklin; Frank Orth
- Cinematography: Ted D. McCord
- Edited by: Frederick Richards
- Music by: Howard Jackson
- Production company: Warner Bros. Pictures
- Distributed by: Warner Bros. Pictures
- Release date: March 13, 1937
- Running time: 54 minutes
- Country: United States
- Language: English

Land Beyond the Law is a 1937 American Western film directed by B. Reeves Eason and written by Luci Ward and Joseph K. Watson. The film stars Dick Foran, Linda Perry, Wayne Morris, Harry Woods, Irene Franklin and Frank Orth. It was released by Warner Bros. on March 13, 1937.

== Plot ==
In the Old West, Charles "Chip" Douglas becomes the Sheriff of Bitter Creek after his father is killed by cattle rustlers who terrorize the ranchers in an ongoing range war. Chip makes it clear he will protect the ranchers and bring justice to the town. Louise Turner, daughter of saloon owner, Cattle Kate Turner, is attracted to Chip.

The rustlers continue their reign of terror. Chip is ambushed and taken hostage by the rustlers, led by Tascosa. Deciding to quit Tascosa's gang, Dave Massey and Bandy Malarkey free Chip, who tells them to return to Bitter Creek and raise a posse.

Meanwhile, Chip locates Tascosa and Slade Henaberry as the two make a deal for Henaberry to buy the stolen cattle. A fight ensues during which Henaberry is killed, but Tascosa escapes. Chip pursues Tascosa, but is slowed down by Tascosa's gang who shoot at him. The posse arrives and a gunfight ensues, during which Tascosa rides away. Chip catches Tascosa and arrests him. Tascosa admits the stolen cattle are located in Hidden Valley. The cattle are returned and Chip and Louise ride off on Chip's horse as he sings "The Prairie Is My Home."

== Cast ==
- Dick Foran as Charles Chip Douglas
- Linda Perry as Louise Turner
- Wayne Morris as Dave Massey
- Harry Woods as Tascosa
- Irene Franklin as Cattle Kate Turner
- Frank Orth as Deputy Shorty Long
- Gordon Hart as Major Daniel Adair
- Cy Kendall as Slade Henaberry
- Glenn Strange as 'Bandy' Malarkey
- Milton Kibbee as Sheriff Spence
- Edmund Cobb as Mason
- Henry Otho as Kirby
- Tom Brower as John Douglas
- Paul Panzer as Jim Blake
- Joe King (uncredited) as Governor Lew Wallace

== Critical reception ==
Variety stated that the film would please Dick Foran fans and "has punch, guts and speed, with a lot of action sprayed around the fringes." It noted that Wayne Morris, currently rising in popularity due to his success in Kid Galahad, played a role that was incidental, but that his presence may appeal to some female movie-goers "who would normally pass a western by."

== Previous Versions ==
This was the third iteration of this story. The first was a 1927 silent of the same title, starring Ken Maynard. The second was 1932's The Big Stampede, with John Wayne and Noah Beery, one of six Warner B-westerns that were all remakes of Maynard silents, using stock footage of the big action scenes (with Wayne wearing the same costume for matching purposes). This version has no footage from the previous two.
