= Prairie Thunder =

1937 film by B. Reeves Eason

- Theatrical release poster
- Directed by: B. Reeves Eason
- Screenplay by: Ed Earl Repp
- Produced by: Bryan Foy
- Starring: Dick Foran; Janet Shaw; Frank Orth; Wilfred Lucas; Albert J. Smith; Yakima Canutt
- Cinematography: Ted D. McCord
- Edited by: Harold McLernon
- Music by: Howard Jackson
- Production company: Warner Bros. Pictures
- Distributed by: Warner Bros. Pictures
- Release date: September 11, 1937
- Running time: 55 minutes
- Country: United States
- Language: English

Prairie Thunder is a 1937 American Western film directed by B. Reeves Eason and written by Ed Earl Repp. The film stars Dick Foran, Janet Shaw, Frank Orth, Wilfred Lucas, Albert J. Smith and Yakima Canutt. The film was released by Warner Bros. Pictures on September 11, 1937. It was the last of 12 B-westerns Foran made for Warners as a singing cowboy (as he was often billed) from 1935 to 1937.

== Plot ==
In the Old West, a telegraph line is coming to Buffalo Creek, where general store owner Nate Temple lives with his daughter Joan. Joan is courting Rod Farrell, a scout for the Union Army. Rod is ordered to investigate a break in the telegraph line, along with sidekick, Wichita, a Union soldier. Rod finds the break in the line in Indian territory and repairs it. Rod suspects a white man assisted the local Indian tribe in sabotaging the line. Rod and Wichita ride up on an Indian camp. The Indian chief, High Wolf, tells Rod the Indians intend to make war because the railroad and the telegraph coming to the region have depleted the buffalo population. High Wolf confirms a white man, who he will not name, is the only friend to his tribe. Rod and Wichita discover a man named Lynch and his gang are supplying the Indians with weapons and ammunition in exchange for the Indians hijacking supply trains. Rod and Wichita breach the gang's hideout, take Lynch and his gang into custody, hold them at Temple's store, and telegraph the cavalry for help. Rod rides off with Joan while Wichita guards the gang. Matson, one of Lynch's men who was not arrested, tells High Wolf of the gang's arrest, and a slew of Indian braves invade Buffalo Creek terrorizing the town with gunfire. Rod and Joan, hearing the gunfire, head toward town. Matson and High Wolf free the gang and Lynch orders the Indians to burn the town. Lynch intercepts Rod and Joan. Rod is taken to the Indian camp, and Joan is taken to Lynch's hideout. Wichita overhears Lynch and sneaks into the Indian camp where Rod is tied to a stake to be burned. Lynch also arrives at the camp telling High Wolf to strike the railroad workers camp. Wichita, dressed as an Indian, frees Rod and the pair head for Lynch's hideout where they rescue Joan, then head to the railroad construction camp with the Indians in pursuit. The citizens of Buffalo Creek, now displaced after the town was burned, fortify their wagons on the outskirts of town and a gunfight ensues as the Indians arrive. Rod, Wichita and Joan join in the fight. The cavalry arrives and the Indians retreat. High Wolf is shot and Rod subdues Lynch. Rod is awarded a congressional medal and promoted to colonel. Rod and Joan ride off as Rod sings "The Prairie Is My Home."

== Cast ==
- Dick Foran as Rod Farrell
- Janet Shaw as Joan Temple
- Frank Orth as Wichita
- Wilfred Lucas as Nate Temple
- Albert J. Smith as Lynch
- Yakima Canutt as High Wolf
- George Chesebro as Matson
- Slim Whitaker as Indian Fighter
- J. P. McGowan as Colonel Stanton
- John Harron as Lieutenant Adams
- Jack Mower as Portland
- Henry Otho as Chris
- Paul Panzer as Jed
