= Treachery Rides the Range =

1936 film by Frank McDonald

- Theatrical release poster
- Directed by: Frank McDonald
- Screenplay by: William Jacobs
- Story by: William Jacobs
- Produced by: Bryan Foy
- Starring: Dick Foran; Paula Stone; Craig Reynolds; Monte Blue; Carlyle Moore Jr. Henry Otho
- Cinematography: L. William O'Connell
- Edited by: Frank Magee
- Music by: Howard Jackson
- Production company: Warner Bros. Pictures
- Distributed by: Warner Bros. Pictures
- Release date: May 2, 1936
- Running time: 56 minutes
- Country: United States
- Language: English

Treachery Rides the Range is a 1936 American Western film directed by Frank McDonald, written by William Jacobs, and starring Dick Foran, Paula Stone, Craig Reynolds, Monte Blue, Carlyle Moore Jr. and Henry Otho. It was released by Warner Bros. Pictures on May 2, 1936.

== Cast ==
- Dick Foran as Capt. Red Taylor
- Paula Stone as Ruth Drummond
- Craig Reynolds as Wade Carter
- Monte Blue as Col. Drummond
- Carlyle Moore Jr. as Little Big Wolf
- Henry Otho as Burley Barton
- Jim Thorpe as Chief Red Smoke
- Monte Montague as Henchman Nebraska
- Don Barclay as Corporal Bunce
- Frank Bruno as Little Fox
- Milton Kibbee as Man at Relay Station
- Tom Wilson as Denver
- Bud Osborne as Henchman Pawnee
- Nick Copeland as Neal

== Reception ==
T.M.P. of The New York Times said, "Set against a picturesque background of rolling hills, Treachery Rides the Range moves smoothly from beginning to end and is nicely acted by Mr. Foran and Paula Stone, who provide the romantic interest; by Monte Blue as the colonel and Jim Thorpe as the Indian chief."
