= Melody Trail =

1935 film by Joseph Kane

- Lobby card
- Directed by: Joseph Kane
- Screenplay by: Sherman L. Lowe
- Story by: Sherman L. Lowe; Betty Burbridge
- Produced by: Nat Levine
- Starring: Gene Autry; Ann Rutherford; Smiley Burnette
- Cinematography: Ernest Miller
- Edited by: Lester Orlebeck
- Music by: Lee Zahler
- Production company: Republic Pictures
- Distributed by: Republic Pictures
- Release date: October 21, 1935 (U.S.)
- Running time: 61 minutes
- Country: United States
- Language: English
- Budget: $15,075

Melody Trail is a 1935 American Western film directed by Joseph Kane and starring Gene Autry, Ann Rutherford, and Smiley Burnette. Written by Sherman L. Lowe and Betty Burbridge, the film is about a singing cowboy who goes after the men who kidnapped the baby he should have been babysitting. The film features the songs "On the Melody Trail", "A Lone Cowboy on the Lone Prairie", and "Western Lullaby".

== Plot ==
A radio and music star, Gene Autry (Gene Autry), and his friend, comedian Frog Millhouse (Smiley Burnette), attend a rodeo where Gene falls in love with one of the spectators, Millicent Thomas (Ann Rutherford). Millicent, who is being harassed by her father's former ranch hand, Matt Kirby (Al Bridge), is delighted when Gene sings for the crowd, then later beats Matt in a bucking bronco competition.

That night, while Gene dreams about Millicent, his $1,000 in rodeo winnings are stolen by a gypsy named Frantz (Willy Castello), the husband of a fortune-teller named Perdita (Marie Quillan). The next day, while Millicent goes into town with her father, rancher Timothy Thomas (Wade Boteler) with Millicent's dog, Souvenir (a compulsive thief), takes a detour into the gypsy camp. Souvenir steals a basket containing Frantz and Perdita's baby daughter Rica. Millicent later discovers the infant and takes her in, not knowing who her parents are. Frog and Gene, who end up working as cooks on the Thomas ranch, assume the baby is hers.

Going by the name of "Arizona", Gene captures two wild stallions to impress Millicent and the cowgirls she has hired to replace Matt and his men, who have defected. After Souvenir steals Gene's cookbook, his efforts in the kitchen are far less successful, and the meal that he and Frog prepare for the cowgirls makes them all sick. Meanwhile, Matt plots to rustle the Thomas' cattle. While the cowgirls bathe in a pond, Matt steals their clothes in order to prevent them from protecting the herd.

While searching for Baby Rica, Frantz recovers her from Millicent. Believing him to be a kidnapper, Gene pursues and captures the gypsy, who returns the money he stole from Gene after explaining that Rica is his daughter. Later, Gene sees Matt and his men stealing the cattle and apprehends all eight of them, including Matt, single-handedly. After Gene saves the ranch, he and Millicent, and Frog and Cuddles (one of the cowgirls), are married in a large, musical ceremony along with the other cowboys and girls. The wedding is interrupted, however, when everyone realizes that Souvenir has stolen all their wedding rings.

== Cast ==
- Gene Autry as Gene Autry
- Ann Rutherford as Millicent Thomas
- Smiley Burnette as Frog Millhouse
- Wade Boteler as Timothy T. Thomas
- Willy Castello as Gypsy Frantz
- Al Bridge as Matt Kirby
- Fern Emmett as Nell, the Cowgirl Foreman
- Marie Quillan as Gypsy Perdita
- Gertrude Messinger as Cowgirl Cuddles
- Tracy Layne as Henchman Slim
- Abe Lefton as World Famous Rodeo Announcer
- Ione Reed as Mamie
- Jane Barnes as Helen
- Buck as Souvenir, Millicent's Dog
- Champion as Champion, Gene's Horse

== Production ==
=== Casting ===
Melody Trail was the first of four film appearances by Ann Rutherford as Gene Autry's leading lady. Therese Ann Rutherford was born in Vancouver, British Columbia, on November 2, 1917. After her parents divorced, her mother, a silent film actress, moved to Hollywood with Ann and her sister. While still in middle school, Rutherford began acting in a serial drama at radio station KFAC. In 1935, she made her first film appearance in Waterfront Lady for Mascot Pictures. Following her leading lady role in Melody Trail, Rutherford would go on to appear in three more Gene Autry films: The Singing Vagabond (1935), Comin' Round the Mountain (1936), and Public Cowboy No. 1 (1937). In 1937, Rutherford left Republic Pictures and signed with Metro-Goldwyn-Mayer, where she made several films, including Pride and Prejudice (1940). In 1939, she played the role of Carreen O'Hara, the sister of Scarlet O'Hara, in the film Gone with the Wind. From 1937 to 1942, Rutherford portrayed Polly Benedict in the MGM Andy Hardy youth comedy film series with actor Mickey Rooney. She retired from films in 1950. Rutherford died on June 11, 2012, at her home in Beverly Hills, California.

=== Filming and budget ===
Melody Trail was filmed August 21–27, 1935. The film had an operating budget of $15,075 (equal to $354,006 today), and a negative cost of $18,386 (equal to $431,759 today).

=== Filming locations ===
- Pendleton, Oregon (rodeo scenes)
- Jack Garner Ranch, State Highway 74, San Bernardino National Forest, California, US

=== Stuntwork ===
- Ken Cooper (Gene Autry's stunt double)
- George DeNormand
- Cliff Lyons
- Joe Yrigoyen

=== Soundtrack ===
- "Hold On Little Dogies Hold On" (Gene Autry) by Gene Autry
- "On the Melody Trail" (Smiley Burnette) by Gene Autry
- "Polka in F" by the gypsies (instrumental)
- "Way Down on Bottom" (Gene Autry, Smiley Burnette) by Smiley Burnette (a cappella)
- "A Lone Cowboy on the Lone Prairie" (Gene Autry) by Gene Autry and the cowgirls
- "Western Lullaby" (Gene Autry) by Smiley Burnette, Gene Autry, and the cowgirls
- "My Neighbor Hates Music" (Gene Autry, Smiley Burnette) by Smiley Burnette (vocals, accordion, harmonica, and tambourine)
- "Where Will the Wedding Supper Be?" (Gene Autry, Smiley Burnette) by Gene Autry, the brides, grooms, and minister
