= Robert Gordon-Canning =

British fascist (1888–1967)

Robert Gordon-Canning MC
- Born: 24 June 1888; Hartpury, Gloucestershire, England
- Died: 4 January 1967 (aged 78); Hartpury, Gloucestershire, England
- Occupations: Soldier; journalist; farmer
- Political party: British Union of Fascists
- Spouse: Mary Maguire (m. 1939; div. 1944)
- Military career
- Allegiance: United Kingdom
- Branch: British Army
- Service years: 1906–1925
- Rank: Captain
- Units: Royal Gloucestershire Hussars; 10th (Prince of Wales's Own Royal) Hussars
- Conflicts: World War I
- Awards: Military Cross

Robert Cecil Gordon-Canning MC (24 June 1888 – 4 January 1967) was a notable British fascist, anti-Semite and supporter of Arab nationalist causes. He was briefly married to Australian actress Mary Maguire.

== Background and military career ==
Gordon-Canning was born in Hartpury, Gloucestershire, the only son of William James Gordon-Canning, and his wife Clara, a daughter of Crawshay Bailey. His father was the fourth son of Captain Patrick Robert Gordon, of the 78th Highlanders, son of William Gordon of Milrig, Ayrshire and descended from a branch of Clan Gordon. In 1848 Captain Gordon married Maria Canning of Hartpury, and added her surname to his own. Gordon-Canning claimed, and it is sometimes stated as fact, that the poet Lord Byron, was his great-grandfather.

He was educated at Eton, was commissioned as a second lieutenant in the Royal Gloucestershire Hussars on 15 November 1906, and was promoted to lieutenant in the 10th (Prince of Wales's Own Royal) Hussars on 14 March 1912. He was appointed a temporary captain on 18 November 1914, soon after the start of World War I, and this was confirmed on 15 May 1915. In June 1917, Gordon-Canning was awarded the Military Cross, "for conspicuous gallantry and devotion to duty." He was transferred to the General Reserve of Officers on 29 March 1919, and eventually resigned his commission on 19 August 1925.

== Early political activities ==
After the war, Gordon-Canning became a supporter of Arab nationalist causes. He was involved in advocating for Moroccan independence during the Rif War and visited Morocco at least twice in the mid-1920s, the first time for the Red Cross and later to present independence views to the French government. He wrote several books of poetry at this time, including "Flashlights from Afar" (1920), "A Pagan Shrine" (1922) and "The Death of Akbar" (1923). Australian diplomat R. G. Casey reported meeting Gordon-Canning in January 1926. He described him as "having come into the limelight lately owing to his having been the vehicle and mouthpiece for Abd el-Krim's 'peace' terms to the French. He has a shifty eye and is, I think, not altogether a disinterested peacemaker." Casey went on to describe "a very heated exchange of words about Morocco between [Gordon-]Canning and Sir Malcolm Robertson." Casey felt Gordon-Canning's approach combined "journalism with gentlemanly adventure."

In 1929 Gordon-Canning visited Palestine and met with leaders of the Palestinian National Movement. He was a critic of British policy in Palestine. From March to May 1930 the British police kept Margaret Milne Farquharson of the National Political League and Canning under observation to monitor their interactions with a delegation sent to London by the executive committee of the Palestine Arab Congress (ECPAC).

== British Union of Fascists ==
In 1934 Gordon-Canning joined the British Union of Fascists (BUF). In October 1936 he was best man at the wedding of Sir Oswald Mosley and Diana Mitford in Germany, becoming the movement's expert on foreign affairs and given the role of 'Director of Overseas Policy'. He wrote regularly for fascist publications and developed the BUF slogan "Mind Britain's Business", which was also the title of one of his pamphlets. After a personal disagreement with Mosley, he left from the BUF in 1939, joining other fascist groups, including the British People's Party, The Link, and Archibald Ramsay's anti-Semitic group, the Right Club. Historian Brian Simpson notes Gordon-Canning prominent amongst those trying to fuse Britain's far–right groups at the outbreak of war. He hosted the first of a series of meetings of like minded personalities at his London flat on 19 September 1939.

== Marriage and internment ==
Gordon-Canning met Australian-born Hollywood actress Mary Maguire in June 1939. Despite the 30-year age difference, they married in August 1939. Ironically, Gordon-Canning had previously written disparagingly of the influence and tone of Hollywood films. In July 1940, Gordon-Canning was interned under Defence Regulation 18B and was not released until 1943. A child, Michael Gordon-Canning, was born of the union in February 1941, but died in infancy. Gordon-Canning and Maguire were divorced in November 1944, and Maguire remarried, moving back to the US in an effort to restart her acting career. Gordon-Canning remarried Patricia Koring a muse for artist Albert Daniel Rutherston in 1952, and by this marriage had a daughter, Louise Gordon-Canning who subsequently had a son William Gordon-Canning in 1978.

== Post war ==
At a sale of former German embassy property in 1945, Gordon-Canning attracted significant publicity when he purchased a large marble bust of Hitler for £500 (equivalent to £19,000 today). Apparently by way of justification, he told reporters "Jesus, 2000 years ago was mocked, scorned and crucified. Today, He is a living force in the hearts and minds of millions of people." These comments, associating Hitler with Jesus, suggest he was associated with a small group called the League of Christian Reformers, who deified Hitler. Journalist John Roy Carlson—a pseudonym of Avedis "Arthur" Boghos Derounian—claims Gordon-Canning wrote him a letter explaining his reasons for purchasing the bust: "To challenge the Jews. To prevent purchase by them. To return [it] to Germany at a suitable time"

Carlson also exposed Gordon-Canning's ongoing anti-Semitism in his 1951 book on subversive politics, Cairo to Damascus. Living after the war between his apartment in London and his farm in Sandwich, Kent, the book indicates Gordon-Canning was still in touch with other former internees and fascist sympathisers. Posing as an anti-Semite himself, Carlson records Gordon-Canning as saying, "I used to see Hitler in Munich and Berlin, and once had supper with Goebbels. Hitler was a fine man, a charming man. If three Hitlers had been allowed to rule the world – in Germany, Italy and England – we wouldn't be in the fix we are now." Carlson also writes of dining twice at Gordon-Canning's apartment in Cadogan Square in London with Barry Domvile and Archibald Ramsay. He states Gordon-Canning allowed his apartment to be used as a meeting place for Arab nationalists and claimed to be a close friend of Abdul Rahman Hassan Azzam. "I am one of the few Englishmen the Arabs trust completely", he is alleged to have said.

Gordon-Canning's last political initiative was a failed attempt in 1949 to persuade Abdul Rahman Hassan Azzam, the Secretary General of the Arab League, to invite J. F. C. Fuller to give lectures on military strategy to inspire new Arab campaigns against Israel. On his visit to Cairo, he also met with Hussam ad-Din Jarallah, the Grand Mufti of Jerusalem.

Gordon-Canning remarried in 1952. He died on 4 January 1967.

In November 2002 the Security Service (MI5) files on Gordon-Canning (KV 2/877-878) were released into the public domain.

== Sources ==
- Griffiths, Richard (2017), What Did You Do During the War? The Last Throes of the British Pro-Nazi Right, 1940–45, London: Routledge, ISBN 9781138888968
