= Arizona Legion =

1939 film

- Theatrical poster
- Directed by: David Howard
- Screenplay by: Oliver Drake
- Story by: Bernard McConville
- Produced by: Bert Gilroy
- Starring: George O'Brien; Laraine Day
- Cinematography: Harry Wild
- Edited by: Frederic Knudtson
- Music by: Roy Webb
- Production company: RKO Radio Pictures
- Release date: January 20, 1939 (US)
- Running time: 61 minutes
- Country: United States
- Language: English

Arizona Legion is a 1939 American Western film directed by David Howard from a screenplay by Oliver Drake, based on Bernard McConville's story. Produced and distributed by RKO Radio Pictures, it was released on January 20, 1939, and stars George O'Brien and Laraine Day (billed under her earlier stage name of Laraine Johnson).

== Plot ==
Boone Yeager has sold his ranch and cattle, and now spends his days drinking, gambling, and hanging around a gang of very disreputable individuals. His fiancée, Letty Meade, is distraught over his sudden change in behavior and breaks off their engagement. In addition, his longtime friend Bob Ives, a lieutenant in the local army troop, also severs his relationship with Yeager in response to Yeager's recent activities. However, it is revealed that Letty's father, Judge Meade, has empowered Yeager to infiltrate the local gang and hunt down its leader, while at the same time organizing the Arizona Rangers.

Yeager gets in good with the gang, but cannot get them to reveal who their leader is. Finally, he participates in a stagecoach hold-up with the gang, along with his friend, Whopper Hatch. However, during the hold-up Yeager, Hatch, and two of the gang members are captured and thrown in jail. While behind bars, Yeager finally learns the true identity of the gang leader, who happens to be the local commissioner, Teagle. Yeager gets a meeting with his old friend, Ives, who he tries to tell the truth to, but Ives refuses to believe his story. Even worse, after leaving the meeting, Ives blows Yeager's cover to Teagle.

Yeager and Hatch manage to escape, and they round up the Arizona Rangers and go after the gang. When the local cavalry arrive, the gang is routed, and all are arrested, as well as recovering all the money the gang had stolen. Letty and Boone are reunited, and she once again accepts his engagement ring.

== Cast ==
- George O'Brien as Boone Yeager
- Laraine Day as Letty Meade (credited as Laraine Johnson)
- Carlyle Moore Jr. as Lieutenant Bob Ives
- Chill Wills as Whopper Hatch
- Tom Chatterton as Commissioner Teagle
- Edward Le Saint as Judge Clayton L. Meade
- William Royle as Dutton
- Harry Cording as Whiskey Joe
- Glenn Strange as Kirby
- Monte Montague as Dawson
- Robert Burns as Tucson Jones
- Joe Rickson as Dakota

== Production ==
In the beginning of November 1938 it was revealed that the name of the picture would be Arizona Legion, and would star George O'Brien. It was O'Brien's tenth film in two years for RKO, and it was his nineteenth pairing with director David Howard. Shortly after, it was revealed that Laraine Day (as Laraine Johnson) was cast as the female lead. Slated to begin earlier, production on the film was delayed, but finally took place from November 8–23. Although both Motion Picture Daily and Motion Picture Herald give the date of the close of filming as November 25. Some of the exterior sequences were shot at Santa Susana, California. Editing on the picture had begun by December 3, and continued through the end of December. The rest of the cast of the film was revealed by the end of December, including Chill Wills, Carlyle Moore, Edward Le Saint, Harry Cording, Tom Chatterton, William Royle, Glenn Strange, Monty Montague, Joe Rickson, and Robert Burns. By mid-January, the release date was scheduled for January 20. The film was released on January 20, 1939. The National Legion of Decency gave the film a Class A-1 designation, meaning it was unobjectionable to general audiences.

== Reception ==
Harrison's Reports gave the film a favorable review, calling it "George O'Brien's best western to date." While they felt the script was weak, they felt the direction, photography, and acting more than made up for the script's deficiency, stating: "Romance and comedy are interpolated without interfering with the action." Motion Picture Daily also gave the film a positive review saying, "Here's a western sure to thrill the outdoor action adventure fans." And "not very often has spectacular action been made so much an integral part of a picture." They enjoyed the script better than Harrison's Reports, calling it "believable," and also complimented Howard's direction. They enjoyed Day's performance, and highlighted the work of the supporting cast: Chatterton, Cording, and Strange as the bad guys, and Le Saint as O'Brien's friend. They particularly highlighted Wills' work, calling him "the source of the story's comedy content and in every appearance he should provoke laughter." Motion Picture Herald was most enthusiastic about the film, also calling it the "...best picture George O'Brien ever made." They felt Day's romance with O'Brien was better than those in other westerns, and gave high marks to Chill Wills' performance. Overall they stated: "It has everything that a soundly constructed outdoor motion picture is supposed to have – romance, melodrama, comedy, musical and tall story telling interludes and thrills ... The natural outdoor settings are objects of pictorial beauty. The caliber of acting throughout is high grade."
