= Over the Goal =

1937 film by Noel M. Smith

- Theatrical release poster
- Directed by: Noel M. Smith
- Screenplay by: William Jacobs; Anthony Coldeway
- Story by: William Jacobs
- Produced by: Bryan Foy
- Starring: June Travis; William Hopper; Johnnie Davis; Gordon Oliver; William Harrigan; Willard Parker
- Cinematography: Warren Lynch
- Edited by: Everett Dodd
- Music by: Heinz Roemheld
- Production company: Warner Bros. Pictures
- Distributed by: Warner Bros. Pictures
- Release date: October 16, 1937
- Running time: 63 minutes
- Country: United States
- Language: English

Over the Goal is a 1937 American comedy film directed by Noel M. Smith and written by William Jacobs and Anthony Coldeway. The film stars June Travis, William Hopper, Johnnie Davis, Gordon Oliver, William Harrigan and Willard Parker. The film was released by Warner Bros. Pictures on October 16, 1937.

== Plot ==
A wealthy alumnus of Carlton College promises to leave his fortune to the school, but only if it can defeat football rival State three consecutive years. After two victories in a row, the alumnus dies. His descendants want his money for themselves, and therefore desperately want Carlton to lose the big game.

Ken Thomas is the star player for Carlton, but he is injured and a doctor has cautioned him that he risks permanent damage to his health if he plays. Ken has given his word to girlfriend Lucille that he won't play, but after she releases him from that promise, the rich benefactor's relatives scheme to have Ken accused of stealing a car and placed under arrest.

Campus friends come to his rescue just in time for Ken to suit up for Carlton and save the day.

== Cast ==
- June Travis as Lucille Martin
- William Hopper as Ken Thomas
- Johnnie Davis as Tiny Waldron
- Gordon Oliver as Benton
- William Harrigan as Jim Shelly
- Willard Parker as Duke Davis
- Eric Stanley as Dr. Martin
- Raymond Hatton as Deputy Abner
- Herbert Rawlinson as Stanley Short
- Douglas Wood as Dr. Marshall
- Eddie "Rochester" Anderson as William
- Hattie McDaniel as Hannah
- Fred MacKaye as Clay
- Eddy Chandler as Police Sergeant Peters
- George Offerman Jr. as Teddy
- Jack Chapin as Bill 'Pinky'
- Robert Hoover as Larkin
- John Craven as King

== Reception ==
Frank Nugent of The New York Times said, "Over the Goal is just another of those football films, leading circuitously to the inevitable moment when Carlton's white hope breaks away from his jailers to change the score from 0—13 to 14—13 in the last two minutes of play. The only difference between it and its cinematic uncles, aunts, cousins and grandfathers is the cast. It has several new faces, the best among them being the comic one of Johnnie Davis, formerly of Fred Waring's orchestra. We still feel two indifferent pictures do not compensate for the absence of one good one."

== See also ==
- List of American football films
