= Keep Smiling (1938 film) =

1938 film by Monty Banks

- Directed by: Monty Banks
- Written by: Rodney Ackland; William M. Conselman; Val Valentine
- Produced by: Robert Kane
- Starring: Gracie Fields; Mary Maguire; Roger Livesey; Peter Coke; Jack Donohue
- Cinematography: Mutz Greenbaum
- Edited by: James B. Clark
- Music by: Bretton Byrd
- Production company: 20th Century Productions
- Distributed by: 20th Century-Fox
- Release date: 12 August 1938
- Running time: 83 minutes
- Country: United Kingdom
- Language: English
- Budget: £254,629

Keep Smiling (also known as Smiling Along) is a 1938 British comedy film directed by Monty Banks and starring Gracie Fields, Roger Livesey and Mary Maguire. It was written by Rodney Ackland, William M. Conselman and Val Valentine.

The film follows a group of performers who club together to buy a bus and travel around the country doing shows after they are cheated out of money by an ex-manager.

== Plot ==
After being swindled by their manager, Gracie Fields' concert party, the Keep Smiling Troupe, is in financial difficulty. They are rescued after a chance meeting, via his dog, with renowned pianist Rene Sidani, whose appearance attracts the crowds to their show at a seaside pavilion.

== Cast ==
- Gracie Fields as Gracie Gray
- Roger Livesey as Bert Wattle
- Mary Maguire as Avis Maguire
- Peter Coke as Rene Sigani
- Jack Donohue as Denis Wilson
- Hay Petrie as Jack
- Mike Johnson as Charlie
- Eddie Gray as Silvo
- Tommy Fields, Gladys Dehl and Nino Rossini as The Three Bolas
- Edward Rigby as Silas Gray
- Joe Mott as Bill Sneed
- Philip Leaver as De Courcy
- Gus McNaughton as Eddie Perkins
- Paula Raymond as Bettina Bowman (credited as Paula Rae Wright)
- Carol Adams as Dancer
- Joss Ambler as Max
- Monty Banks as auditioner
- Hal Gordon
- Wilfrid Hyde-White as assistant hotel clerk
- Eliot Makeham as printer
- Julian Vedey as hotel clerk

== Production ==
It was the second film made by Fields under her contract with 20th Century-Fox, and was made at Pinewood Studios with sets designed by the art director Oscar Friedrich Werndorff. It was retitled Smiling Along to avoid confusion with another film with the same name, released by Fox in America the same year, and starring Jane Withers.

Fields' salary was £50,000 making her the best paid British based film star of the 1930s.

== Reception ==
The Monthly Film Bulletin wrote: "Whether she is dancing in a sinking houseboat, knocking people over the head in a fun fair or singing – with an unexpected beauty and dignity – the anthem in a little country church she is always "Our Gracie", the darling of the North. To support her the film contains humour, reasonably catchy tunes and moments of sentiment here and there as seasoning. The photography is excellent and there is a wholesome freshness about the whole picture which is very pleasant."

Kine Weekly wrote: "The picture is ... nothing more nor less than Gracie Fields. There are no supporting artistes of particular note and nothing particularly outstanding in treatment or presentation. All it's got the star gives. The obvious and only summing up is, therefore, cast-iron light entertainment for Gracie Fields' fans."

Picturegoer wrote: "You can get a smile now and then, but it is rarely that it develops into a hearty laugh. Gracie Fields' personality and singing are the film's main assets, but it is a pity that her talent should not have a wider scope."

Picture Show wrote: "Gracie Fields returns to comedy and gives a typical performance. The film gives the star plenty of opportunity to display her comedy talent and to sing everything from broad comedy numbers to "The Holy City." She has a good supporting cast headed by Roger Livesey."

== Bibliography ==
- Wood, Linda. British Films, 1927-1939. British Film Institute, 1986.
