= Rosella Towne =

American actress (1918–2014)

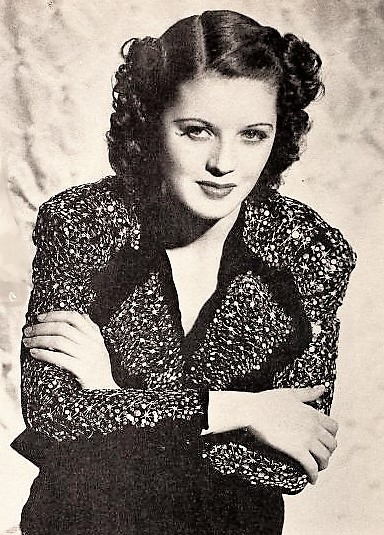
- Born: Rosella Townsend; January 20, 1918; Youngstown, Ohio, United States
- Died: August 29, 2014 (aged 96); Hamden, Connecticut, United States
- Occupation: Film actress
- Years active: 1937–1943
- Children: Anthony T. Kronman

Rosella Towne (January 20, 1918 – August 29, 2014) was an American film actress. She was born in Youngstown, Ohio. Her film career began in 1937, after making a screen test for Warner Bros. and signing a contract for the studio. At first she made minor appearances in motion pictures such as Varsity Show, It's Love I'm After and Submarine D-1. She studied with Neely Dickson at the Hollywood Community Theater. In 1939, she got her first leading role when she was chosen to play the part of comic-strip character Jane Arden in a film adaption. While touted by critics as a future star, Towne retired from showbusiness after marrying Harry Kronman, a Hollywood producer, in 1942. She died on August 29, 2014, aged 96. Towne was cremated.

== Filmography ==
- Varsity Show (1937) as passerby
- It's Love I'm After (1937) as autograph seeker
- Submarine D-1 (1937) as Mary
- Expensive Husbands (1937) as Brenner's receptionist
- Hollywood Hotel (1937) as secretary
- Sergeant Murphy (1938) as Alice Valentine
- The Patient in Room 18 (1938) as Maida Day
- Blondes at Work (1938) as Louisa Revelle
- Fools for Scandal (1938) as Diana
- Gold Diggers in Paris (1938) as golddigger
- Men Are Such Fools (1938) as Linda's secretary
- Cowboy from Brooklyn (1938) as Panthea Landis
- Sons of the Plains (short) (1938)
- Boy Meets Girl (1938) as hospital nurse
- Secrets of an Actress (1938) as seated party guest
- Campus Cinderella (short) (1938) as co-ed
- The Sisters (1938) as telephone operator
- Hard to Get (1938) Miss Gray
- Declaration of Independence (1938) as Betsy Kramer
- Going Places (1938) as young lady at party
- Yes, My Darling Daughter (1939) as Edith Colby
- Secret Service of the Air (1939) as Zelma Warren
- The Adventures of Jane Arden (1939) as Jane Arden
- Women in the Wind (1939) as Phyllis
- Dark Victory (1939) as girl in box
- Code of the Secret Service (1939) as Elaine
- The Private Lives of Elizabeth and Essex (1939) as lady of the court
- Flight Angels (1940) as student
- Rocky Mountain Rangers (1940) as Doris Manners
- No, No, Nanette (1940) as stewardess
- The Hard-Boiled Canary (1941) as girl
- A Gentle Gangster (1943) as Helen Barton
