= The Flying Doctor =

- Theatrical film poster
- Directed by: Miles Mander
- Written by: J. O. C. Orton; Miles Mander
- Based on: novel by Robert Waldron
- Starring: Charles Farrell; Mary Maguire
- Cinematography: Derick Williams
- Edited by: J.O.C. Orton; R. Maslyn Williams; Edna Turner
- Music by: Willy Redsone; Alf. J. Lawrence
- Production companies: National Productions; Gaumont-British Pictures
- Distributed by: 20th Century-Fox (Aust)
- Release dates: 23 September 1936 (Aust); September 1937 (UK)
- Running time: 92 min. (Aust); 67 min. (UK)
- Country: Australia
- Language: English
- Budget: £45,000 or $175,000

The Flying Doctor is a 1936 Australian-British drama film directed by Miles Mander and starring Charles Farrell, Mary Maguire and James Raglan. The melodrama concerns the adventures of Sandy Nelson in the Australian Outback and includes a subplot of the Royal Flying Doctor Service of Australia. Australian cricketer Don Bradman appears as himself in a cameo during the film. It has been described as a "fiasco".

== Plot ==
On his wedding night, Sandy Nelson decides to abandon his young bride, Jenny to go work in Sydney as a painter on the Harbour Bridge. He befriends a doctor, John Vaughan, who is in love with a married woman. Vaughan decides to acquire his flying license in order to accept a job as flying doctor in the outback.

Sandy gets in a brawl at a cricket match, serves time in prison, then heads for the outback and discovers gold. He is shot in a barroom fight and loses his eyesight. He then discovers Vaughan has fallen in love with Jenny, his former bride. When he realises Jenny loves Vaughan, Sandy decides to kill himself, leaving his fortune to the Flying Doctors.

== Cast ==
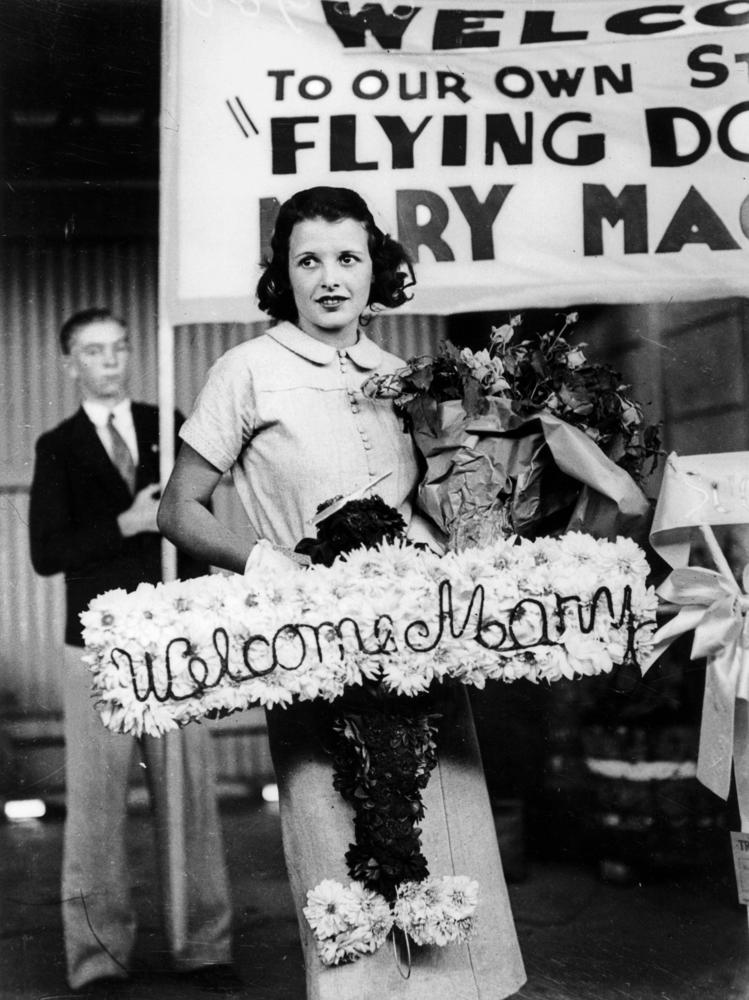
Mary Maguire returning to Brisbane after filming The Flying Doctor (1936)

- Charles Farrell as Sandy Nelson
- Mary Maguire as Jenny Rutherford
- James Raglan as Doctor John Vaughan
- Joe Valli as Dodger Green
- Margaret Vyner as Betty Webb
- Eric Colman as Geoffrey Webb
- Tom Lurich as Blotch Burns
- Maudie Edwards as Phyllis
- Katie Towers as Mrs. O'Toole
- Phillip Lytton as Doctor Gordon Rutherford
- Andrew Beresford as John Rutherford
- Jack Clarke as Pop Schnitzel
- Phil Smith as Barman Joe
- Donald Bradman as Himself
- William Hartnell as Abe McKeller

== Original Novel ==
The film was based on a novel by Robert Waldron which was published in 1934. It was Waldron's first book.

The novel was adapted for radio in 1934. The movie included elements of the novel but is not a faithful adaptation.

=== Premise ===
Dr John Vaughan is rejected by his fiancée. He goes to work in Cloncurry for the Flying Doctors with his childhood friend Ann as a nurse. His fiancée re enters his life.

== Production ==
=== National Productions ===
The Flying Doctor was the first and only production from National Productions, a new Australian film production company which was formed in the 1930s under the management of Frederick Daniell, a promoter involved with radio and newspaper companies in Sydney. Amongst its directors were Sir Hugh Denison, Sir Samuel Walder and Sir James Murdoch.

The company was closely associated with National Studios Ltd, which built a large studio complex in Pagewood, Sydney. It was incorporated in September 1935 with capital of £50,000.

=== Pre-production ===
National Productions had links to the British company, Gaumont British, which had been interested in making a film in Australia for a long time, with Robert Flaherty intending to shoot one. Gaumont provided technical and financial support for the company.

Gaumont British provided several personnel for the film, including the director, writer, cinematographer, unit manager and sound recordist. National Productions also hired Englishman Errol Hinds to be head of the camera department for two years.

The British unit arrived in November 1935. In December, American star Charles Farrell was signed to play the lead. He did not arrive until late January 1936. According to Filmink "There was a trend at the time to import third-tier Hollywood names to appear in Australian films; this would generate considerable publicity at home and possibly help overseas sales."

=== Shooting ===
Shooting began in 1936 with bad weather helping the budget increase. The film was shot at National Studio's Pagewood facility. Director Miles Mander left for Hollywood in March 1936, leaving J.O.C. Orton to finish the film.

== Reception ==
Mary Maguire lived in Brisbane, so it was decided to hold the film's international premiere there. 20th Century-Fox agreed to distribute the film free of charge.

A review by Variety observed that the film "might have amounted to something big had Orton set his story to cover the epic work that is being done... by the Flying Medical Association. As it stands now the...[film] just rambles from point to point without very much meaning, and the real interest does not begin until... [it] reaches its final climax. Mander's direction is jumpy and leaves much to be desired."

Box office receipts were poor but the release of the film led to a flood of donations to the Flying Doctors. Reviews were patchy.

Aviation film historian Stephen Pendo in Aviation in the Cinema (1985), described The Flying Doctor as "lackluster."

Gaumont British decided not to distribute the film in the UK and it was done by General Film Distributors.The Flying Doctor was never released in the USA.

Prior to shooting, National Productions had announced an intention to make three more films, but none of these were made.

Stephen Vagg of Filmink magazine later argued:

The movie is weird. So weird. It feels like a story made up as it goes along, with "stuff" shoved in desperately – 'Waltzing Matilda', sheep, cockatoos, the Harbour Bridge, wrestling, cricket, Don Bradman, prison, gold mines, married women, long lost brides, brawls in bars, blindness, nightclubs, planes. Indeed, there's so much Australiana combined with narrative slackness that at times you're wondering if the filmmakers are taking the piss. We can't understand why Gaumont didn't make a movie about, you know, a Flying Doctor.

== Preservation status ==
The Flying Doctor was thought to have been lost until workmen clearing a building site in the Wollongong suburb of Fig Tree uncovered a film vault. They cut through the steel door using an oxy torch – somehow avoiding igniting the highly flammable nitrate film inside – and loaded a truck with the contents to take away for disposal. An office worker saw the truck drive by, loaded with film cans, gave chase in his car, and rescued the film, which included the first eight of nine reels of The Flying Doctor. Two years later, the BFI National Film Archive in London found a copy of the shortened, re-edited British release of the film, also eight reels long, in the possession of a large film company. Despite this print having been "totally rearranged", the last reel was found to take up exactly where the Australian one left off.
