= Man of the People (film) =

1937 film by Edwin L. Marin

- Theatrical release poster
- Directed by: Edwin L. Marin
- Screenplay by: Frank Dolan
- Story by: Frank Dolan
- Produced by: Lucien Hubbard
- Starring: Joseph Calleia; Florence Rice; Thomas Mitchell; Ted Healy; Catherine Doucet
- Cinematography: Charles G. Clarke
- Edited by: William S. Gray
- Music by: Edward Ward
- Production company: Metro-Goldwyn-Mayer
- Distributed by: Loew's Inc.
- Release date: January 29, 1937
- Running time: 80 minutes
- Country: United States
- Language: English

Man of the People is a 1937 American drama film directed by Edwin L. Marin and written by Frank Dolan. The film stars Joseph Calleia, Florence Rice, Thomas Mitchell, Ted Healy and Catherine Doucet. The film was released on January 29, 1937, by Metro-Goldwyn-Mayer.

== Plot ==
All that attorney Jack Moreno wants to do is help his friends and the people from his neighbourhood, but in order to make a living he has to do business with the mob.

== Cast ==
- Joseph Calleia as Jack Moreno
- Florence Rice as Abbey
- Thomas Mitchell as Grady
- Ted Healy as Joe 'The Glut'
- Catherine Doucet as Mrs. Reid
- Paul Stanton as Stringer
- Jonathan Hale as Carter Spetner
- Robert Emmett Keane as Murphy
- Jane Barnes as Marie Rossetti
- William Ricciardi as 'Pop' Rossetti
- Noel Madison as 'Dopey' Benny
- Soledad Jiménez as Mrs. Rossetti
- Edward Nugent as Edward Spetner
- Donald Briggs as Baldwin

== Gallery ==
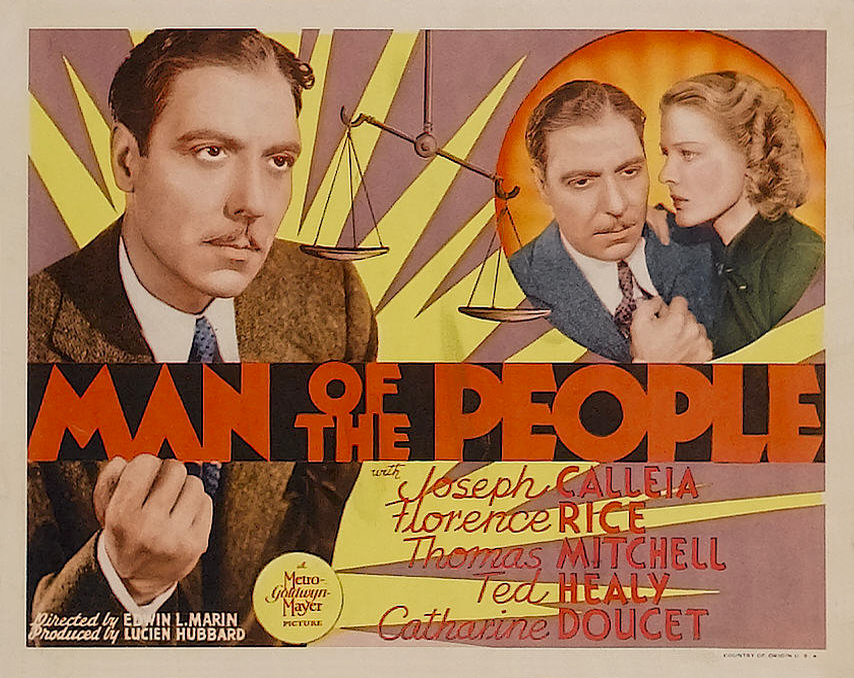
Title lobby card

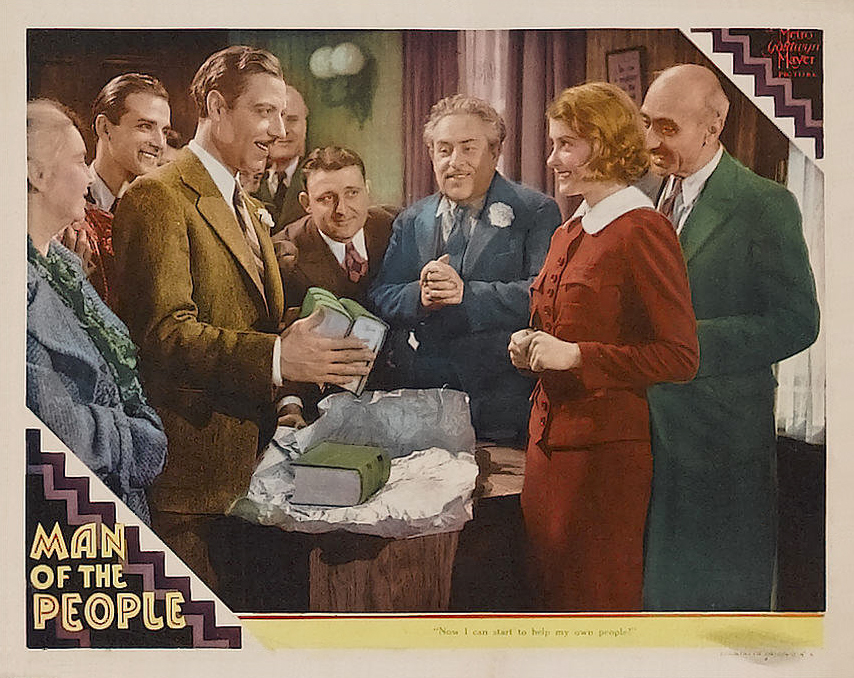
"Now I can start to help my own people"

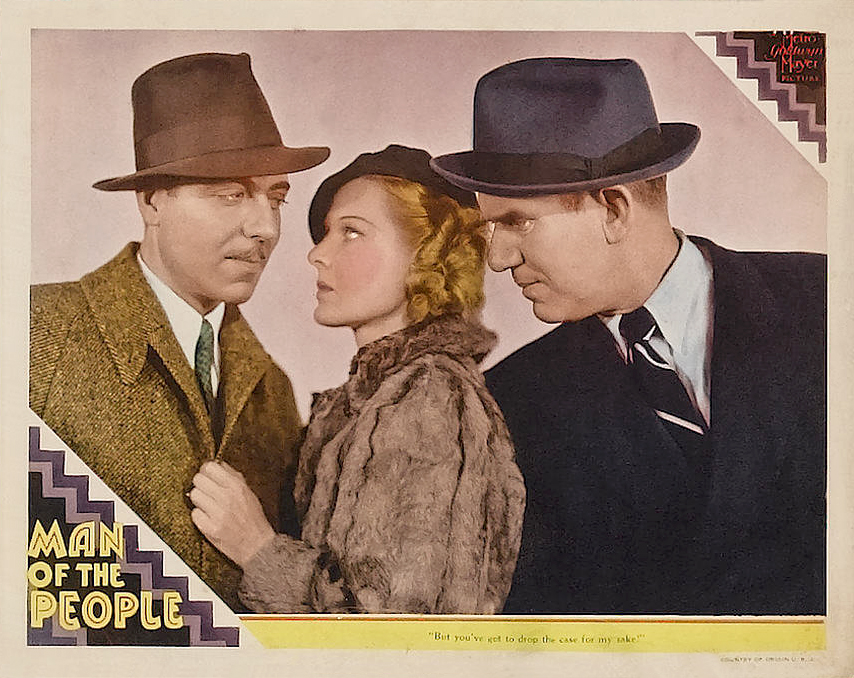
"But you've got to drop the case for my sake"

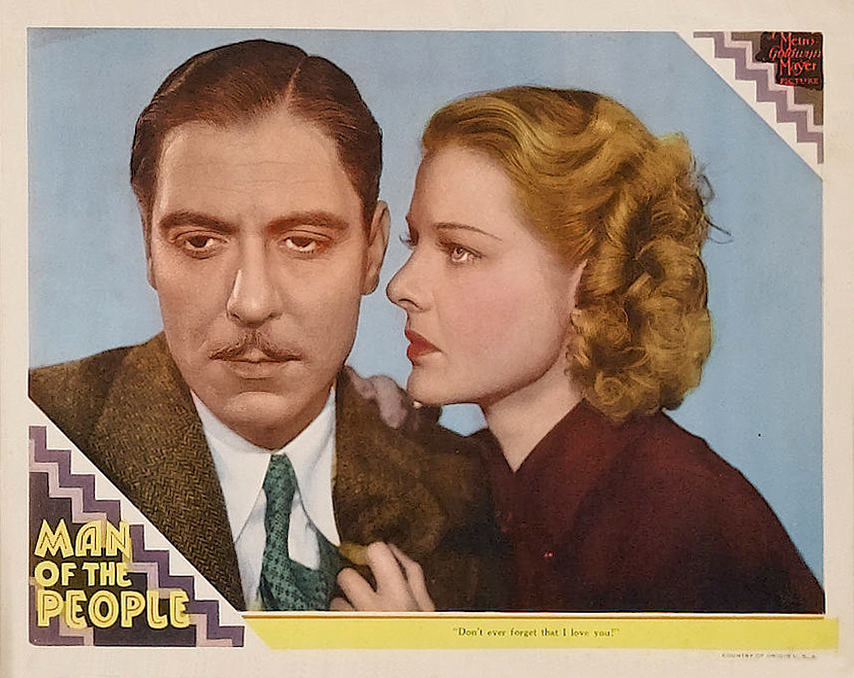
"Don't ever forget that I love you"
