= Code of the Secret Service =

1939 film by Noel M. Smith

- Poster of Code of the Secret Service
- Directed by: Noel M. Smith
- Screenplay by: William H. Moran; Lee Katz; Dean Riesner
- Produced by: Bryan Foy; Hal B. Wallis; Jack L. Warner
- Starring: Ronald Reagan; Rosella Towne; Eddie Foy, Jr. Moroni Olsen; Edgar Edwards; Jack Mower
- Cinematography: Ted D. McCord
- Edited by: Frederick Richards
- Music by: Bernhard Kaun; Max Steiner
- Production company: Warner Bros. Pictures
- Release date: May 27, 1939
- Running time: 58 minutes
- Country: United States
- Language: English

External videos
- Original Trailer for Code of the Secret Service

Code of the Secret Service is a 1939 film directed by Noel M. Smith and starring Ronald Reagan. It is the second of four films in the U.S. Secret Service Agent Brass Bancroft series, having been preceded by Secret Service of the Air (1939) and followed by Smashing the Money Ring (1939) and Murder in the Air (1940).

The series was part of a late 1930s effort by Warner Bros. Pictures to produce films depicting law enforcement in a positive light under pressure from Homer Stille Cummings (Franklin D. Roosevelt's Attorney General) and Will H. Hays (creator of the Motion Picture Production Code, the film industry's censorship guidelines), due to the studio's part in producing early 1930s films glamorizing gangsters.

The series also enabled Warner Bros. to create Reagan's screen persona, with Reagan even showing up to the set of Code of the Secret Service and asking director Noel M. Smith, "When do I fight and whom?"

== Plot ==
United States Secret Service Lieutenant Brass Bancroft (Ronald Reagan) and his partner, Gabby Watters (Eddie Foy, Jr., producer Bryan Foy's brother), seek engraving plates stolen from the U.S. Treasury Department by a counterfeiting ring in Mexico. Fellow Secret Service agent Dan Crockett informs Bancroft that the leader of the gang is a peg-legged man named Parker, but he is killed and Bancroft is falsely blamed for the death.

He boards a train to Santa Margarita with two members of the counterfeiting gang, who tip off authorities and bring the police to the train. After Bancroft escapes the train, Parker arrives in disguise as a friar and captures him at an abandoned mission church. After Bancroft flees, the police capture him. Gabby helps him break out of prison by distracting the guards with a game of strip poker. Brass kidnaps a woman named Elaine and forces her to take him to a telegraph station to contact the U.S. State Department. They are captured by the counterfeiters but escape and destroy the engraving plates. The mission explodes and Parker flees with the remaining plates but dies in an automobile crash after a car chase. Brass wins Elaine's heart and returns to Washington, D.C., with the plates.

== Cast ==
The cast included:

- Ronald Reagan as Lieutenant Brass Bancroft
- Rosella Towne as Elaine
- Eddie Foy, Jr. as Gabby Watters
- Moroni Olsen as Parker
- Edgar Edwards as Ross
- Jack Mower as Decker
- John Gallaudet as Dan Crockett
- Joseph King as Tom "Jim" Saxby
- Steve Darrell as Butch, a henchman
- Sol Gorss as Dutch, a henchman
- George Regas as Mexican police officer

== Production ==
The film was shot on location in Mexico using extras and sets from the film Juarez. Ronald Reagan insisted on doing all of his own stunts.

== Reception ==
Reagan called Code of the Secret Service "the worst picture I ever made" and commented on it, "never has an egg of such dimensions been laid." Producer Bryan Foy attempted to shelve the film. Warner Bros. Pictures refused to do so, but did agree to not release it in Los Angeles. Commenting on the film, a ticket taker at a movie theater in another city reportedly told Reagan, "You should be ashamed."

In a 1939 review, the Calgary Herald called the movie "quite far-fetched in places and not very interesting as a whole."

== Ronald Reagan assassination attempt ==
After seeing the movie repeatedly as a child, Jerry Parr was inspired to join the Secret Service. Parr would go on to save the life of the President of the United States in a 1981 assassination attempt. The President was none other than Ronald Reagan, the star of Code of the Secret Service.
