= Black Eyes (1939 film) =

1939 British film by Herbert Brenon

- Directed by: Herbert Brenon
- Written by: Dudley Leslie
- Produced by: Walter C. Mycroft
- Starring: Otto Kruger; Mary Maguire; Walter Rilla
- Cinematography: Günther Krampf
- Edited by: Lionel Tomlinson
- Music by: Walford Hyden
- Production company: Associated British Picture Corporation
- Distributed by: Associated British Picture Corporation
- Release date: 8 April 1939
- Running time: 80 minutes
- Country: United Kingdom
- Language: English
- Budget: £33,074

Black Eyes is a 1939 British drama film directed by Herbert Brenon and starring Otto Kruger, Mary Maguire and Walter Rilla. It is a remake of the 1935 French film Dark Eyes.

== Cast ==
- Otto Kruger as Ivan Ivanovich Petroff
- Mary Maguire as Tanya Petroff
- Walter Rilla as Roudine
- John Wood as Karlo Karpoff
- Marie Wright as Miss Brown
- Jenny Laird as Lucy
- O. B. Clarence as Waiter
- Ralph Truman as Diner
- Ballard Berkeley as Diner
- Ernest Butcher as Diner
- Michael Wilding as Officer

== See also ==
- Dark Eyes (1935)
