= Janet Shaw (actress) =

American actress

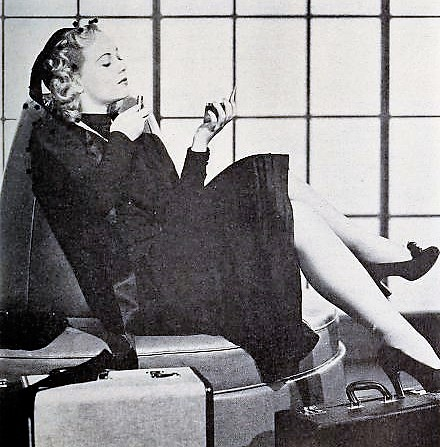
- Born: Ellen Martha Clancy; January 23, 1919; Beatrice, Nebraska, U.S.
- Died: October 15, 2001 (aged 82); Beatrice, Nebraska, U.S.
- Resting place: Evergreen Home Cemetery, Beatrice, Nebraska, U.S.
- Occupation: Actress
- Years active: 1935–1955
- Spouse(s): Willard Garcia Ilefeldt (1944–1945) (divorced); David Ashford Stuart (1946-1984, his death)

Ellen Martha Clancy (January 23, 1919 – October 15, 2001), was an American actress. In her 1930s films she was billed as Ellen Clancy; then she adopted the professional name Janet Shaw.

== Early years ==
Born on January 23, 1919, in Beatrice, Nebraska, Ellen Clancy was picked as the finest baby in Nebraska when she was 18 months old. She was the daughter of Philip Windsor Clancy. After attending elementary schools in Nebraska, she attended high schools in Santa Monica and Beverly Hills, graduating from the latter. Actress Olive May was her aunt.

== Career ==
Ellen Clancy acted on stage with Harold Lloyd's Beverly Hills Little Theatre for Professionals, the Gateway Little Theater, and the Pasadena Community Players.

In 1935 she signed with Warner Bros. As Ellen Clancy. she worked regularly in the Warner stock company, appearing in major features (Jezebel, The Adventures of Robin Hood, Gold Diggers in Paris), minor features (Sergeant Murphy, Torchy Blane in Chinatown, Accidents Will Happen), westerns (as Dick Foran's leading lady), and short subjects. She left Warners in 1939 and began freelancing under a new screen name, Janet Shaw. She retired from the screen in 1950, and made a single television appearance in 1955.

== Personal life ==
On April 19, 1944, in Beverly Hills, Shaw married Willard Ilefeldt, a former actor who was serving in the Army Air Forces, but the union was a brief one. In 1946 she married David Stuart, and they remained married until his death in 1984.

She died of Alzheimer's disease on October 15, 2001, in Beatrice, Nebraska at age 82.

== Filmography ==
Year	Title	Role	Notes
1935	She Married Her Boss	Secretary	Uncredited
1937	Confession	Actress	Uncredited
1937	Prairie Thunder	Joan Temple	
1937	It's Love I'm After	Autograph Seeker	Uncredited
1937	Alcatraz Island	Sally Carruthers	
1937	Expensive Husbands	Telephone Operator	Uncredited
1937	She Loved a Fireman	Girl at Dance	Uncredited
1937	Hollywood Hotel	Girl at Premiere	Uncredited
1938	Sergeant Murphy	Joan Furse	
1938	Jezebel	Molly Allen	
1938	Accidents Will Happen	Mary Tarlton - Gregg's Secretary	
1938	The Adventures of Robin Hood	Humility's Daughter	Uncredited
1938	Gold Diggers in Paris	Golddigger	
1938	Secrets of an Actress	Switchboard Operator	Uncredited
1938	Broadway Musketeers	Hospital Nurse	Uncredited
1938	The Sisters	Stella Johnson	
1938	Girls on Probation	Prison Inmate	
1938	Comet Over Broadway	Janet's Dining Companion	Uncredited
1938	Going Places	Young Lady at Party	Uncredited
1939	King of the Underworld	Blonde Nurse	Uncredited
1939	They Made Me a Criminal	Girl Entering Locker Room	Uncredited
1939	Torchy Blane in Chinatown	Janet Baldwin	
1939	The Rookie Cop	Gerry Lane	
1939	The Old Maid	Dee	
1940	Blondie on a Budget	Anniversary Cake Usherette	Uncredited
1940	Alias the Deacon	Mildred Gregory	
1940	Waterloo Bridge	Maureen	
1940	Flight Angels	Mrs. Perry	
1940	Hired Wife	Lucy - the Bride	Uncredited
1940	Escape	Greta - a Student	Uncredited
1941	Lucky Devils	Gwendy Wimple	
1941	You're Out of Luck	Joyce Dayton	
1941	Blossoms in the Dust	Tess	Uncredited
1941	Gambling Daughters	Katherine Thompson	
1941	Hold That Ghost	Alderman's Girl	Uncredited
1941	Johnny Eager	Alice	Uncredited
1941	Honolulu Lu	Debutante	Uncredited
1942	Night Monster	Milly Carson	
1942	The Mummy's Tomb	Girl in Car	Uncredited
1943	Shadow of a Doubt	Louise Finch	
1943	How's About It	Judy	Uncredited
1943	Hi'ya, Chum	Chorine	Uncredited
1943	Bad Men of Thunder Gap	Martha Stewart	
1943	Hangmen Also Die!	Katerina Honiga	Uncredited
1943	Keep 'Em Slugging	Young Girl	Uncredited
1943	False Faces	Diana Harding	
1943	Hers to Hold	Girl at Factory	Uncredited
1943	Let's Face It	Girl in Boat	Uncredited
1943	Arizona Trail	Martha Brooks	
1944	Ladies Courageous	Bee Jay	
1944	Hi, Good Lookin'!	Information Girl	Uncredited
1944	It Happened Tomorrow	Waitress	Uncredited
1944	Follow the Boys	Phone Operator	Uncredited
1944	Johnny Doesn't Live Here Any More	Gladys	
1945	The Scarlet Clue	Gloria Bayne	
1945	I'll Tell the World	Switchboard Operator	
1945	Jungle Raiders	Ann Reed	Serial
1945	Sensation Hunters	Katie Rogers	
1946	Because of Him	Reporter	Uncredited
1946	The Scarlet Horseman	Elise Halliday	
1946	House of Horrors	Cab Driver	Uncredited
1946	Dark Alibi	Miss Petrie	
1946	Inside Job	Blonde Girl	Uncredited
1946	Nocturne	Grace Andrews	Uncredited
1947	Time Out of Mind	Penny	
1947	They Won't Believe Me	Susan Haines - Verna's Roommate	Uncredited
1950	Prehistoric Women	Minor Role	Uncredited
