= Jane Barnes (actress) =

American actress (1910–1998)

- Barnes c. 1937
- Born: Jane Fenmore Barnes; August 17, 1910; Mansfield, Massachusetts, US
- Died: March 20, 1998 (aged 87); Victorville, California, US
- Other name: Jane Barnes Moore
- Occupation: Actress
- Years active: 1934–1937
- Spouse: Carlyle Moore Jr.
- Parent: Clarence A. Barnes

Jane Fenmore Barnes (August 17, 1910 – March 20, 1998) was an American film and theatre actress during the 1930s. She studied to become a concert pianist before deciding to become an actress. She spent several years on the theatre circuit and did radio dramas and modeling before becoming a film star for Fox Studios.

Cast in multiple major and minor film roles from 1934 through 1937, she then returned to theatre work to hone her acting skills before marrying actor Carlyle Moore Jr. in August 1937. When her theatre plans in New York on Broadway did not work out, she became a columnist for multiple papers, moving several times back to Massachusetts and then Hollywood. In her later years, she settled in Victorville, California, and became a part of her local library group to support her love of books.

== Career ==
Barnes was born as Jane Fenmore Barnes in Mansfield, Massachusetts, to Clarence A. Barnes, the Massachusetts Attorney General and Helen (née Long), a fashion magazine artist. She attended the Wykeham Rise School for Girls and studied to become a concert pianist. Ultimately, however, she changed her mind on her career choices and instead signed a contract with Fox Studios to become an actress. Before signing, she had worked as a secretary for her father's Representative office before obtaining acting experience by appearing for two years in the Phidelah Rice Players theatre group in Martha's Vineyard. At the same time, she also performed in radio dramas and was featured as a model on magazine covers.

While on a chartered ship, the SS Virginia, from New York to Los Angeles in 1933, Barnes' voyage encountered a hurricane in the Caribbean Sea, though she was uninjured. She eventually arrived at Movietone City to begin film work. Not long after arriving, she also began taking flying lessons in secret, so that she could pilot her own plane back home. In a 1936 contest to find the "Perfect Extra" that had 8,000 women competing, Barnes was chosen as the winner by a group of directors from Central Casting and given a film contract. This also led to her being cast as one of the main female roles in 1937's Man of the People. In the summer of 1937, Barnes returned to her home state to learn new techniques for acting. Joining the Mary Young Company in Centerville, Massachusetts, she aimed to appear in several theatre performances to obtain, as Marjory Adams for The Boston Globe stated, that "extra bit of polish which a girl needs nowadays to compete".

After her training, she moved to New York to attempt to break into Broadway before she planned to return to Hollywood films as a more high-profile star. Living in Gramercy Park, she wrote from scratch her audition roll to try and get a theatre contract, naming it "Miss Milquetoast in New York". Her theatre plans did not work out, however, and she later moved back to Massachusetts and became a column writer for the Mansfield News and Foxboro Times. Her column was titled "Barnes Storming in Hollywood". Soon after, she returned to Hollywood and became switchboard receptionist for the American Federation of Radio Artists. She also wrote a chat column in the organization's bulletin.

Years later, Barnes moved to Victorville, California, and spent her time as secretary for the Friends of the Victorville Library group, helping them fundraise and support local children's programs. She continued writing, publishing a column in the local Daily Press titled "Ex Libris" to showcase her love for books.

== Filmography ==
- Such Women Are Dangerous (1934) as Nancy Ryan
- Too Many Women (1934), a short
- Gold Rush of 1934 (1934) (Wild Gold)?
- The Gay Deception (1935)
- Your Uncle Dudley (1935) as Marjorie Baxter
- Naughty Marietta (1935)
- Melody Trail (1935) as Helen
- Frontier Justice (1935) as Ethel Gordon
- Hollywood – The Second Step (Short, 1936)
- Man of the People (1937) as Marie Rossetti
- Stan (1937) a film produced by the Standard Oil Company of Indiana

== Personal life ==
First meeting in the summer of 1937 on the stage for the play Stop Light, Barnes married actor Carlyle Moore Jr. on August 28, 1937. They had three children together. She died on March 20, 1998, due to heart failure, aged 87.
