= Sergeant Murphy =

1938 film by B. Reeves Eason

- Theatrical release poster
- Directed by: B. Reeves Eason
- Written by: Sy Bartlett; William Jacobs
- Produced by: Bryan Foy
- Starring: Ronald Reagan; Mary Maguire; Donald Crisp; Ben Hendricks Jr. William B. Davidson
- Cinematography: Ted D. McCord
- Edited by: James Gibbon
- Music by: Howard Jackson
- Production company: Warner Bros. Pictures
- Distributed by: Warner Bros. Pictures
- Release date: January 1, 1938
- Running time: 57 minutes
- Country: United States
- Language: English

Sergeant Murphy is a 1938 American comedy film directed by B. Reeves Eason and written by Sy Bartlett and William Jacobs. The film stars Ronald Reagan, Mary Maguire, Donald Crisp, Ben Hendricks Jr. and William B. Davidson. The film was released by Warner Bros. Pictures on January 1, 1938.

== Cast ==
- Ronald Reagan as Pvt. Dennis Reilley
- Mary Maguire as Miss Mary Lou Carruthers
- Donald Crisp as Col. Todd Carruthers
- Ben Hendricks Jr. as Cpl. Kane
- William B. Davidson as Maj. Gruff
- Max Hoffman Jr. as Sgt. Buck Connors
- Robert Paige as Lt. Duncan
- Emmett Vogan as Maj. Smythe
- Tracy Layne as Texas
- Edmund Cobb as Gruff's Adjutant
- Janet Shaw as Joan Furse
- Rosella Towne as Alice Valentine
- Joan Valerie as Bess Merrill
- Sam McDaniel as Henry H. Henry
- Sergeant Murphy as Sergeant Murphy
