= Midnight Court (film) =

1937 film by Frank McDonald

- Theatrical release poster
- Directed by: Frank McDonald
- Written by: Don Ryan (original and screen play); Kenneth Gamet (original and screen play)
- Produced by: Bryan Foy
- Starring: Ann Dvorak; John Litel
- Cinematography: Warren Lynch
- Edited by: Frank Magee
- Production company: Warner Bros. Pictures
- Distributed by: Warner Bros. Pictures
- Release date: March 6, 1937
- Running time: 63 minutes
- Country: United States
- Language: English

Midnight Court is a 1937 American crime drama film released by Warner Bros. Pictures. The film stars Ann Dvorak and John Litel, and was directed by Frank McDonald.

== Plot ==
Victor Shanley (Litel) is a washed-up former district attorney who is arrested during a police raid on skid row. While being arraigned in night court, he encounters his estranged ex-wife, Carol O'Neil (Dvorak), who is working as a court reporter. After giving a deranged speech about the corrupt criminal justice system, Shanley passes out. Carol then takes him home and cleans him up, where he declares that since being on the right side of the law never did him any good, he plans to work as a defense lawyer for criminal boss Al Kruger and his ring of auto thieves.

Despite his ongoing success defending Kruger and his gang, Shanley still feels compelled to do good deeds, mostly influenced by Carol's kind nature. In an effort to help Bob Terrill, a young man caught up in Kruger's auto-theft gang, Shanley offers to pay for his school tuition so he can study aeronautical engineering and end his life of crime. Against Shanley's warnings, Bob decides to tell Kruger that he's leaving, who then arranges to have him killed. When Carol learns of Bob's death, she becomes hysterical and convinces Shanley that he is responsible. He then decides to "go straight" again and becomes special prosecutor for the state against Kruger and his gang, and by doing so, earns the love and respect of Carol.

== Cast ==
- Ann Dvorak as Carol O'Neil
- John Litel as Victor Shanley
- Carlyle Moore Jr. as Bob Terrill
- Joseph Crehan as Judge Thompson
- William B. Davidson as Al Kruger
- Stanley Fields as Slim Jacobs
- Walter Miller as Lieutenant Jerry Burke
- John Sheehan as Clouter Hoag
- Wild Bill Elliott as City attorney Seabrook (as Gordon Elliott)

== Background ==
1937's Midnight Court (originally titled, Justice After Dark) was the first film Ann Dvorak appeared in for Warner Bros. Pictures after being dismissed by the studio in 1935 for purportedly being too ill to work. Dvorak's role in her return film was not unlike roles she had portrayed in previous Warner Bros. productions, but Midnight Court marked the first time she received top billing in the credits.

To prepare for the role of court reporter, Dvorak reportedly spent some time in actual Los Angeles night courts.
