= That Man's Here Again =

1937 film by Louis King

- Directed by: Louis King
- Screenplay by: Lillie Hayward
- Produced by: Hal B. Wallis
- Starring: Hugh Herbert; Mary Maguire; Tom Brown; Joe King; Teddy Hart
- Cinematography: Warren Lynch
- Edited by: Harold McLernon
- Music by: Howard Jackson
- Production company: Warner Bros. Pictures
- Distributed by: Warner Bros. Pictures
- Release date: April 17, 1937
- Running time: 58 minutes
- Country: United States
- Language: English

That Man's Here Again is a 1937 American comedy film directed by Louis King, written by Lillie Hayward, and starring Hugh Herbert, Mary Maguire, Tom Brown, Joe King and Teddy Hart. It was released by Warner Bros. Pictures on April 17, 1937.

== Plot ==
Jimmy (Tom Brown) is an elevator operator in a fancy apartment building. One night, Nancy (Mary Maguire), wet from the rain and having nowhere else to go, breaks into the basement of the building. Jimmy befriends her, and gets her a job working as a maid in the building. Jimmy and Mary begin seeing each other. Mary has a child, but she is hesitant to tell Jimmy, who as expressed a negative attitude toward children. Mary breaks a vase in Mr. Jesse's apartment, and, believing it to be very valuable, and that she will likely be arrested, scrams, leaving a note for Jimmy but not indicating where she will go. Jimmy looks for her unsuccessfully. A letter arrives addressed to Mary which leads Jimmy to the home where Mary's child is being taken care of, but the workers there say they have not seen Mary in weeks. Jimmy is very taken with the baby, and feels great sympathy for Mary's plight. Finally, using the police's missing persons division, Jimmy learns that Mary is in the hospital with pneumonia. Jimmy visits here there as she recovers. They return to the apartment building, where, with Mr. Jesse's help, things work out well for them.

== Cast ==
- Hugh Herbert as Thomas J. Jesse
- Mary Maguire as Nancy Lee
- Tom Brown as Jimmy Whalen
- Joe King as Mr. Ned Murdock
- Teddy Hart as Bud
