= Alcatraz Island (film) =

1937 film by William C. McGann

- Theatrical release poster
- Directed by: William C. McGann
- Screenplay by: Crane Wilbur
- Produced by: Bryan Foy
- Starring: John Litel; Ann Sheridan; Mary Maguire; Gordon Oliver; Dick Purcell; Ben Welden
- Cinematography: L. William O'Connell
- Edited by: Frank DeWar
- Music by: Heinz Roemheld
- Production company: Cosmopolitan Productions
- Distributed by: Warner Bros. Pictures
- Release date: November 6, 1937
- Running time: 63 minutes
- Country: United States
- Language: English

Alcatraz Island is a 1937 American drama film directed by William C. McGann and written by Crane Wilbur. The film stars John Litel, Ann Sheridan, Mary Maguire, Gordon Oliver, Dick Purcell and Ben Welden. The film was released by Warner Bros. Pictures on November 6, 1937.

== Plot ==
Rackateer Gat Brady is on trial for cheating the government. He makes a deal with the prosecutor who will recommend a six-month sentence in jail in exchange for a guilty plea. The judge tosses out the plea agreement and gives Gat five years in prison. His girlfriend Flo Allen promises to wait for him and to look after Gat's daughter. Gangster Red Carroll snatches the girl for ransom. He is caught and then sentenced to serve in the same prison as Gat Brady. In prison, they brawl and Brady is blamed. Later on they are both transferred to another prison where Red is stabbed and killed with a work knife. Brady is put on trial for the murder. His defense attorney works at the New York District Attorney's office and is in love with Gat's daughter. A friend of Gat's from prison talks another convict into taking credit for the crime and Gat is later acquitted. Just as the guilty verdict is about to be read it is revealed that Gat's convict friend is actually an FBI agent who has a recording of the killer's confession made just before he hanged himself.

== Cast ==
- John Litel as 'Gat' Brady
- Ann Sheridan as Flo Allen
- Mary Maguire as Ann
- Gordon Oliver as George Drake
- Dick Purcell as 'Harp' Santell
- Ben Welden as 'Red' Carroll
- Addison Richards as Fred MacLane
- George E. Stone as 'Tough Tony' Burke
- Vladimir Sokoloff as The Flying Dutchman
- Peggy Bates as Miss Tolliver
- Doris Lloyd as Miss Marquand
- Charles Trowbridge as Warden Jackson
- Janet Shaw as Sally Carruthers
- Matty Fain as Butch

== Reception ==
Frank Nugent of The New York Times said, "This rough-and-ready outline may not convey it, but the film has a compact plot, smooth performances by John Litel and the little-known others, and a good bit of interesting material on the present residence of Al Capone. Whether the Alcatraz scenes are accurate or not is beside the point; they do make good watching. And so, for all its Class B-ishness, does the picture."
