= Warren Lynch =

- Born: November 12, 1896; Washington, Indiana, United States
- Died: August 31, 1970 (aged 73); Los Angeles, California, United States
- Occupation: Cinematographer

Warren Lynch (1896–1970) was an American cinematographer and stills photographer.

== Selected filmography ==
- Greed (1924)
- Murder in the Clouds (1934)
- The Widow from Monte Carlo (1935)
- Smart Blonde (1937)
- Midnight Court (1937)
- Over the Goal (1937)
- Dance Charlie Dance (1937)
- That Man's Here Again (1937)
- Blondes at Work (1938)
- Torchy Gets Her Man (1938)
- Torchy Blane in Chinatown (1939)
- Torchy Runs for Mayor (1939)
- The Tanks Are Coming (1951)
- Retreat, Hell! (1952)

== Bibliography ==
- Finler, Joel (2008). Hollywood Movie Stills: Art and Technique in the Golden Age of the Studios. Reynolds & Hearn.
