= False Faces (1943 film) =

1943 film by George Sherman

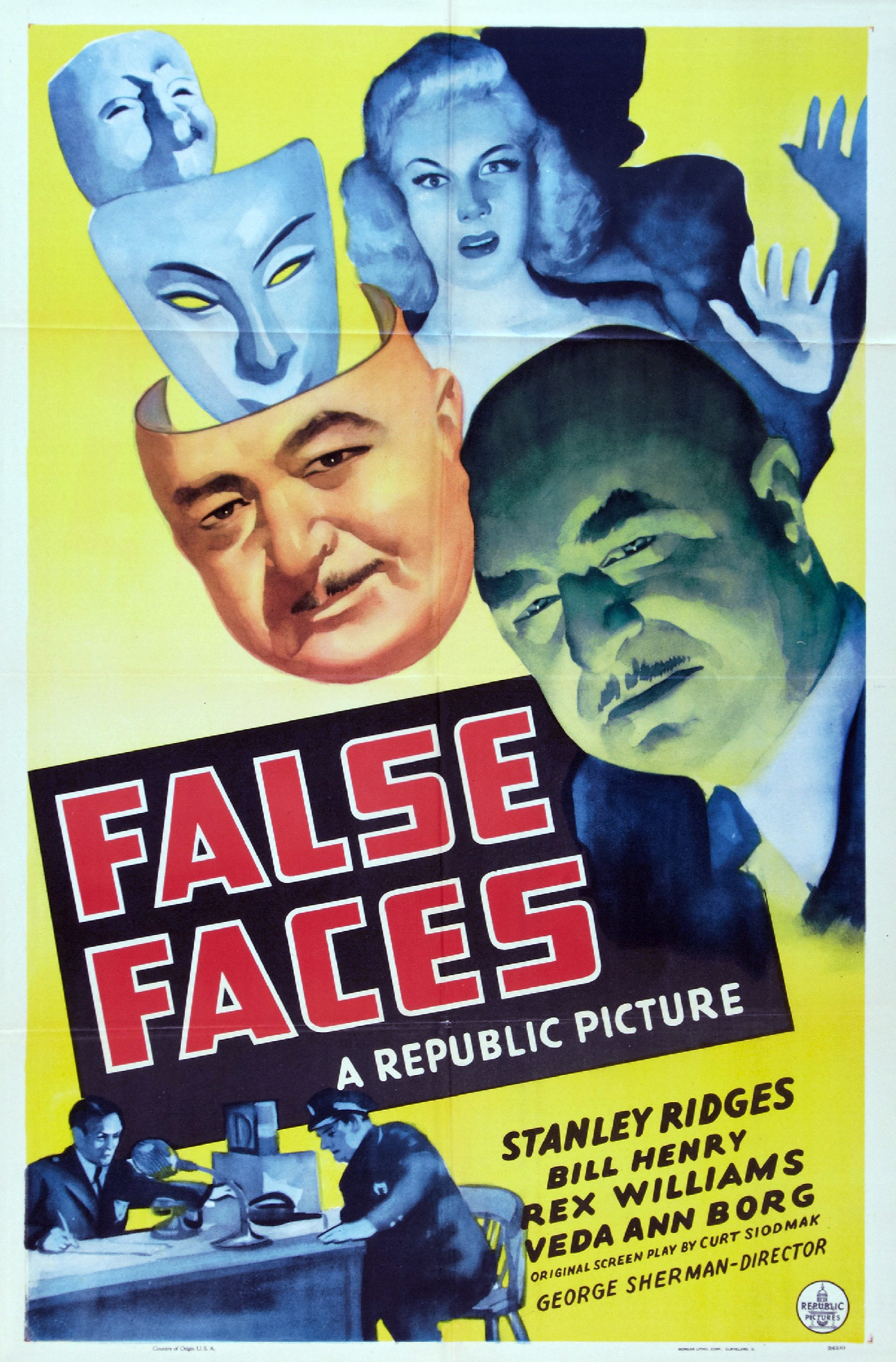
- Theatrical release poster
- Directed by: George Sherman
- Screenplay by: Curt Siodmak
- Produced by: George Sherman
- Starring: Stanley Ridges; Veda Ann Borg; William "Bill" Henry; Janet Shaw; Rex Williams; John Maxwell
- Cinematography: William Bradford
- Edited by: Arthur Roberts
- Music by: Mort Glickman
- Production company: Republic Pictures
- Distributed by: Republic Pictures
- Release date: May 28, 1943
- Running time: 58 minutes
- Country: United States
- Language: English

False Faces is a 1943 American mystery film directed by George Sherman and written by Curt Siodmak. The film stars Stanley Ridges, Veda Ann Borg, William "Bill" Henry, Janet Shaw, Rex Williams and John Maxwell. The film was released on May 28, 1943, by Republic Pictures.

== Cast ==
- Stanley Ridges as District Attorney Stanley Harding
- Veda Ann Borg as Joyce Ford
- William "Bill" Henry as Don Westcott
- Janet Shaw as Diana Harding
- Rex Williams as Craig Harding
- John Maxwell as Assistant District Attorney Stewart
- Joseph Crehan as Police Capt. Alan O'Brien
- Dick Wessel as Detective Mallory
- Chester Clute as Apartment Manager
- Etta McDaniel as Magnolia
- Nick Stewart as Mack
- Claire Whitney as Agnes Harding
- Billy Nelson as Jimmy
- Dick Elliott as Desk Sergeant
- John Dilson as Coroner Burnett
