= Road Gang =

1936 film by Louis King

- Theatrical release poster
- Directed by: Louis King
- Written by: Dalton Trumbo; Harold Buckley (story); Abern Finkel
- Produced by: Bryan Foy (uncredited)
- Starring: Donald Woods; Kay Linaker
- Cinematography: L. William O'Connell
- Edited by: Jack Killifer
- Music by: Heinz Roemheld (uncredited)
- Production company: First National Pictures
- Distributed by: Warner Bros. Pictures
- Release date: March 28, 1936
- Running time: 61 minutes
- Country: United States
- Language: English

Road Gang is a 1936 American drama film directed by Louis King, written by Dalton Trumbo, produced by Bryan Foy, and starring Donald Woods and Kay Linaker. The film shows economic and social injustice due to political corruption.

== Plot ==
The managing editor of a Chicago newspaper crusades for inmates in a Southern prison camp.

== Cast ==
- Donald Woods as James "Jim" Larrabie
- Kay Linaker as Barbara Winston
- Carlyle Moore Jr. as Robert "Bob" Gordon
- Joseph Crehan as Harry Shields
- Henry O'Neill as George Winston
- Joe King as J.W. Moett
- Addison Richards as Warden Parmenter
- Charles Middleton as Mine Warden Grayson
- Olin Howland as Doctor
- William B. Davidson as Atty. Gen. Marsden
- Harry Cording as Sam Dawson
- Mark Lawrence as Pete
- Eddie Shubert as Buck Draper
- Edward Van Sloan as Mr. Dudley
- Ben Hendricks Jr. as Jake
- George Lloyd as Hymie Seeball (the Gorilla)
