= Murder in the Clouds =

1934 film by D. Ross Lederman

- Theatrical poster
- Directed by: D. Ross Lederman
- Written by: Roy Chanslor (story and screenplay); Dore Schary (story and screenplay) (Note: Studio writer Roy Chanslor was teamed with Schary in recycling a typical Warners script.)
- Produced by: Samuel Bischoff
- Starring: Lyle Talbot; Ann Dvorak
- Cinematography: Warren Lynch; Elmer Dyer (aerial scenes)
- Edited by: Thomas Pratt
- Music by: Leo F. Forbstein, conductor: Vitaphone Orchestra; Ray Heindorf, composer: music cues (uncredited); Bernhard Kaun, composer: main and end title music (uncredited)
- Production company: First National Pictures
- Distributed by: Warner Bros. Pictures
- Release date: December 15, 1934
- Running time: 61 minutes
- Country: United States
- Language: English
- Budget: $84,000
- Box office: $351,000

Murder in the Clouds is a 1934 American action film dealing with aviation. The film stars Lyle Talbot and Ann Dvorak, and is directed by D. Ross Lederman. Although standard formula "B" film fare, it was notable as the screenplay and original story was written by Dore Schary as a freelance writer, during one of his periods when he was fired from a more prestigious film job. Schary was a director, writer, producer and playwright who later became head of production at Metro-Goldwyn-Mayer, and eventually president of the studio. Equally important on Murder in the Clouds was the work of Elmer Dyer who had become a preeminent aviation cinematographer.

== Plot ==
Trans-America Air Lines pilot "Three Star" Bob Halsey is in love with stewardess Judy Wagner, but she wants him to stop his daredevil ways. So does his boss, Lackey. Confident in his abilities and knowing that he is the airline's best pilot, he pays neither any mind.

Federal agent Brownell urgently requests Lackey's cooperation: Clement Williams must be flown from Los Angeles to Washington, D.C., with a cylinder full of a revolutionary new explosive he has invented. However, Lackey's assistant Jason is eavesdropping on him for Taggart, a spy.

He eavesdrops again when Lackey chooses Bob as pilot and Judy's brother Tom as co-pilot. Taggart sends three men to provoke Bob into a fistfight. While Bob is knocked out, another pilot, George Wexley, chats casually with Tom, "learns" that Bob is late for the special trip, and offers to protect Bob's job by taking over.

Over the lower Sierras, the Ford Trimotor airliner explodes.

Bob and Lackey fly to the crash site and talk to Brownell. Tom's cap is there. Back in Los Angeles, they report that there are no survivors.

Frantic for news of her brother, Judy drives to the site before they return, evading the police roadblock. She is recognized by Jason, who is traveling with the spies to a nearby house they are using. Improvising a plan, they pose as federal agents and stop her.

At the house she is surprised to see Wexley, who tells her the saboteur ordered him and Tom to parachute out, then set a bomb and himself parachuted out with the cylinder—all nearly true, except that Wexley was the saboteur and Tom is dead. They want to hide the cylinder in Judy's car and trick her into driving to Mexico, so Wexley says that Tom has gone to Tijuana to identify a suspect. She agrees to leave in the morning. But then the radio reports the recovery of Tom's body. Realizing her predicament, Judy pretends not to have heard. That night, finding some paint, she paints Bob's three-star personal logo on the porch roof of the house.

Next day, back at Los Angeles, Bob learns Jason has left the office—with the three men who knocked him out. He and Lackey then discover Jason's eavesdropping device. Bob flies back to the crash area. As his co-pilot he takes Wings, who works as the airline's mechanic because when he got his pilot's license he learned he was afraid to fly. They see the three stars and land.

Bob tells Wings that if there is any sign of trouble he must fly away and alert the Air Patrol. When shots are fired, Wings does just that—not seeing Bob and Judy running for the plane. The spies capture them both.

Wexley and Taggart depart in Wexley's armed biplane, taking Judy and the cylinder. Wings then arrives with the Air Patrol, who capture the rest of the gang after a brief gunfight.

In a dogfight between biplanes, Taggart is killed but the Air Patrol plane is shot down. Now rescued, Bob takes off with Wings. He finds Wexley's plane and executes risky maneuvers to force him to land. Wexley tries to run away and Wings throws a rock at him. Both Judy and the cylinder are recovered.

Although the government is grateful, all that Judy and Bob want to do is get married.

== Cast ==
As appearing in Murder in the Clouds, (main roles and screen credits identified):

- Lyle Talbot as "Three Star" Bob Halsey
- Ann Dvorak as Judy [Wagner]
- Gordon Westcott as George [Wexley]
- Robert Light as Tom [Wagner]
- George Cooper as "Wings" [Mahoney]
- Charles C. Wilson as [William] Lackey
- Henry O'Neill as [John] Brownell
- Russell Hicks as Taggart
- Arthur Pierson as Jason
- Edward McWade as Clement Williams
- Clay Clement as Flight Commander
- Eddie Shubert as Eddie, accomplice
- Wheeler Oakman as Joe, accomplice
- Nick Copeland as Accomplice
- Gordon Elliott as Lieutenant Saunders (uncredited) (Note: Using the screen name, Gordon Elliott, Wild Bill Elliott who later gained fame as a western hero in a score of films and on television, during the 1930s, appeared in hundreds of B films.)
- Walter Brennan (uncredited)

== Production ==
Spirited flying was interspersed with studio backscreen images to produce visually exciting aerial sequences.

Principal photography took place primarily at the Glendale Grand Central Air Terminal and airport, in the Warner Bros. studio, and at Big Bear Lake, California, from August 27 to September 15, 1934. The aircraft used included a Ford Trimotor and Travel Air Speedwings. Much of Dyer's aerial photography in Murder in the Clouds would be reused in future Warners programmers such as Fly-Away Baby and Fugitive in the Sky.

The two leads, Dvorak and Talbot were considered difficult by mainline studios; Talbot was actively involved in the Screen Actors Guild while Dvorak was known to advocate for equitable pay for actors.

=== Soundtrack ===
- "I'll String Along with You" (Music by Harry Warren)
- "Without That Certain Thing" (Written by Max Nesbitt and Harry Nesbitt)

== Reception ==
Murder in the Clouds was both handicapped and praised for its brevity and breeziness. As a "B" film, it was one of a score of aviation-themed films that appeared in quick succession, and had many similarities. By 1934, the film industry became more safety-conscious, with screen air crashes largely being abandoned as more civil aviation topics replaced the usual World War I air battles. A more contemporary review notes "a predictable and formulaic film. Clouds also – and this is also not rare in these knock-offs – suffers from plot holes you could fly an airplane through. In other words, the script is a lot of hooey"

=== Box Office ===
According to Warner Bros records the film earned $244,00 domestically and $107,000 internationally.
