= Secret Service of the Air =

1939 film

- Theatrical poster
- Directed by: Noel M. Smith
- Written by: Raymond L. Schrock; W. H. Moran
- Produced by: Jack L. Warner; Hal B. Wallis
- Starring: Ronald Reagan; John Litel; Ila Rhodes
- Cinematography: Ted D. McCord; Arthur Edeson
- Edited by: Doug Gould
- Music by: Bernhard Kaun; Max Steiner
- Distributed by: Warner Bros. Pictures
- Release date: March 4, 1939
- Running time: 61 minutes
- Country: United States
- Language: English

Secret Service of the Air (also known as Murder Plane) is a 1939 American adventure film directed by Noel M. Smith and starring Ronald Reagan. This film was the first in Warner Bros.' Secret Service series. The series consisted of four films, all starring Ronald Reagan as Lieutenant "Brass" Bancroft of the U.S. Secret Service and Eddie Foy, Jr. as his sidekick "Gabby." It was followed up by Code of the Secret Service, Smashing the Money Ring (both 1939), and Murder in the Air (1940), the last film in the series. Reagan was just starting out his film career and commented later that during that period, he was a B movie "Errol Flynn".

== Plot ==
An undercover Secret Service agent stumbles upon a smuggling ring illegally transporting Mexicans into the United States by air. When he pulls a gun on the pilot on one such trip, the pilot sends the aircraft into a sudden climb, causing the agent to tumble back into the cabin; the pilot then pulls a lever which opens the cabin floor, sending the agent and six illegal aliens plummeting to their deaths.

The agent's boss, Tom Saxby (John Litel), needs a pilot to infiltrate the smuggling ring. He turns to commercial airline and former military pilot "Brass" Bancroft (Ronald Reagan), who has applied to join the Secret Service.

Arrested on a trumped-up charge of counterfeiting, Brass is locked in a cell with gang member "Ace" Hamrick (Bernard Nedell). Brass learns that the smugglers use the Los Angeles Air Taxi Company, where he lands a job (after Saxby has the regular pilot arrested). With his friend and radio operator, "Gabby" Watters (Eddie Foy Jr.), Brass convinces the ringleader, Jim Cameron (James Stephenson), to let him take over the smuggling flights. He tricks Cameron into entering the United States to be captured by the Border Patrol. After an air battle, Brass turns the smugglers over to the authorities, and is greeted by his fiancée, Pamela Schuyler (Ila Rhodes).

== Cast ==
- Ronald Reagan as Lt. "Brass" Bancroft
- John Litel as Tom Saxby
- Ila Rhodes as Pamela Schuyler
- James Stephenson as Jim Cameron
- Eddie Foy Jr. as "Gabby" Watters
- Rosella Towne as Zelma Warren
- Larry Williams as Dick Wayne
- John Ridgely as Joe LeRoy
- Anthony Averill as Hafer
- Bernard Nedell as Earl "Ace" Hemrich
- Frank M. Thomas as Doc
- Joe Cunningham as Agent Dawson
- Morgan Conway as Edward V. Powell
- John Harron as Agent Cliff Durell
- Herbert Rawlinson as Admiral A.C. Schuyler

== Production ==
Scenes for Secret Service of the Air were filmed at the Glendale Airport. The Glendale Airport was at the time the major airfield serving Los Angeles, but after World War II with larger aircraft and jet airliners it could not accommodate, it closed in the mid-1950s.

== Reception ==
With Secret Service of the Air becoming a minor "B" hit, it spawned a series with three more films rushed into completion over the next 15 months. (Note: During this period, Reagan was dating his co-star, Ila Rhodes (Rhodes was a pseudonym; née Ila Rae Curnett; 1918–1982).) Frank S. Nugent of The New York Times dismissed the film as "... considerable melodramatic ado about nothing, since the new film is an uninspired reworking of the old story about smuggling aliens ..."
