= List of fictional nurses =

This is a list of fictional nurses, consisting of nurses having significant roles in fictional works.

== Fictional nurses ==
=== A ===
- Alex from the 2024- American television mockumentary sitcom St. Denis Medical
- Haleh Adams from the American television series ER
- Terri Alden from the American sitcom Three's Company
- Rida Amaan from the British television series Casualty
- Mikuru Asahina from the 2006-2009 Japanese television series The Melancholy of Haruhi Suzumiya
- Attractive Nurse from the 1959 British comedy film Carry On Nurse
- Nurse Georgie Axwell from the 1959 British comedy film Carry On Nurse
- Carmen Almonte from the 2015-2019 Spanish television series Allí abajo

=== B ===
- Julia Baker from the 1968-1971 American television series Julia
- Nurse Susan Ball from the 1972 British comedy film Carry On Matron
- Sue Barton the title character from the 1936-1952 American Little, Brown and Company series of nurse-career-novels for teenage girls, by Helen Dore Boylston
- Nisha Batra from the British television soap opera Brookside
- Hillary Bauer from the 1952-2009 American soap opera Guiding Light
- Dee Bliss from the Australian television soap opera Neighbours
- Julie Bradford, staff nurse from the 1999-2022 British television series Holby City
- Jana Brandner from the 1995-2015 German soap opera Verbotene Liebe
- Nurse Margaret Brody from the American 1936 film The Murder of Dr. Harrigan
- Kim Butterfield from the 1995- British television soap opera Hollyoaks
- Lindsey Butterfield from the British television soap opera Hollyoaks
- Caroline Buxton from the 1992- New Zealand soap opera Shortland Street

=== C ===
- Eva Cassidy the title character from the 2019 Canadian book The Lieutenant's nurse
- Edith Cavell a fictionalised interpretation of the First World War nurse, in the 1939 American film Nurse Edith Cavell
- Christine Chapel from the 1966-1969 American science fiction television series Star Trek
- Malma Chaudury from the British television soap opera EastEnders
- Nurse Clarke from the 1967 British comedy film Carry On Doctor
- Kirsty Clements from the British television series Casualty
- Nurse Conner Comes Home title character from the 1964 American Ace Books nurse-romance by Arlene Hale - writing as Arlene Hale, Gail Everett, Louise Christopher, and Lynn Williams, she wrote over 48 nurse-romances between 1960-1980
- Scarlett Conway from the British television series Casualty
- Nurse Cramer from the 1961 American novel by Joseph Heller Catch-22
- 'Nurse Betsy Crane' title character from the 1961-1964 American Charlton Comics romance book series of [at least 27] books.
- Nadine Crowell from the 1963- American soap opera General Hospital
- Ellen Crozier from the New Zealand soap opera Shortland Street

=== D ===
- Shirley Daniels from the 1982-1988 American television series St. Elsewhere
- Hospital RN Jill Danko from the 1970s American police series The Rookies.
- Student Nurse Stella Dawson from the 1959 British comedy film Carry On Nurse
- Staff Nurse Dorothy Denton from the 1959 British comedy film Carry On Nurse
- Nurse Duckett from Joseph Heller's novel Catch-22
- Lisa "Duffy" Duffin from the British television series Casualty
- Madiha Durrani from the British television series Casualty
- Annie Dutton from the soap opera Guiding Light

=== E ===
- Eliza, the lost love of Faust VIII in the manga and anime of Shaman King
- Carla Espinosa from the 2001-2010 American sitcom Scrubs

=== F ===
- Charlie Fairhead from the British television series Casualty
- Fanny from the fighting video game Guilty Gear Petit
- Mary Fanshawe from the 1934 American film Once to Every Woman
- Adrian "Fletch" Fletcher from the British television series Holby City
- Floria from the 2025 Swiss film Late Shift
- Gaylord "Greg" Focker from the films Meet the Parents and Meet the Fockers
- Mary Forbes student nurse from the 1939 American comedy film Four Girls in White
- Kitty Forman from the sitcom That '70s Show
- Sonia Fowler from the British soap opera EastEnders
- Nurse Freda title character from a 1966 Canadian nurse-romance book by W. E. D. Ross who wrote some 60 nurse romance novels under a variety of mostly female pseudonyms.

=== G ===
- Lisa Garland from survival horror Silent Hill series of video games
- Sarah Gamp from the Charles Dickens British novel Martin Chuzzlewit - and in various adaptations including Martin Chuzzlewit (1964 TV series), Martin Chuzzlewit (1994 TV series)
- Pam Green main character of Rehabilitation Nurse, one of three American nurse-romance books by Patti Carr published by Signet Books 1965-1969

=== H ===
- Audrey March Hardy from the soap opera General Hospital
- Haruhara Haruko, in a brief instance in the first episode of the anime series FLCL
- Nurse Rose Harper from the 1959 British comedy film Carry On Nurse
- Ruby Haswell from the British soap opera Emmerdale
- Carol Hathaway from the television series ER
- Hello Nurse from the animated television series Animaniacs
- Dolores Hicks from the 1925 American silent film Oh Doctor!
- David Hide from the British television series Casualty
- Sister Hoggett from the 1967 British comedy film Carry On Doctor
- Jasmine Hopkins, staff nurse, from the British television series Holby City
- Marie Horton from the soap opera Days of Our Lives
- Margaret "Hot Lips" Houlihan from M*A*S*H

=== J ===
- Donna Jackson from the British television series Holby City
- Nurse Frances James from the 1959 British comedy film Carry On Nurse
- Lily Jarvik from the television series ER
- Maia Jeffries from the New Zealand soap opera Shortland Street
- Tania Jeffries from the New Zealand soap opera Shortland Street
- Epiphany Johnson from the soap opera General Hospital
- Nurse Joy from Japanese franchise Pokémon
- Nurse Judy from the 1938 American film Prison Nurse based on the 1934 novel by the same name
- 'Nurse Julie of Ward Three' title character of the 1964 Canadian Harlequin romance novel by Joan Callendar
- Naomi Julien from the British soap opera EastEnders
- Meena Jutla from the British soap opera Emmerdale

=== K ===
- Asuna Karino from Japanese television series Kamen Rider Ex-Aid
- Sarah Keate the nurse-protagonist in many of Mignon G. Eberhart's American mystery crime novels, including The Patient in Room 18 (1929), While the Patient Slept (1930) and Wolf in Man's Clothing (1942). Subsequently in filmed versions: While the Patient Slept (1935), Murder by an Aristocrat (1936), The Great Hospital Mystery (1937), The Patient in Room 18 (1938), Mystery House (1938), and The Dark Stairway (1938).
- Doris Kendall from the 1931 American film Born to Love (film)
- Maria Kendall from the British television series Holby City
- Clive King, staff nurse from the British television series Casualty
- Doris King from the 1937 American film The Man Who Found Himself
- Katya Kinski from the Australian soap opera Neighbours
- Marty Kirkby from the British television series Casualty
- Vinnie Kruse from the New Zealand soap opera Shortland Street

=== L ===
- Mary Lamont from the 1940 American film Dr. Kildare's Strange Case
- Ayesha Lee from the British soap opera Doctors
- 'Nurse Lingwood's patient', title character from the British nurse-romance novel by Quenna Tilbury; she wrote at least 17 nurse-romances c.1989-c.2019 published by Linford Romance
- Nurse Liz, title character from the 2015 British BBC Paul Whitehouse radio and television comedy series Nurse
- Staff Nurse Helen Lloyd from the 1959 British comedy film Carry On Nurse
- Abby Lockhart from the American television series ER
- Peri Lomax from the British soap opera Hollyoaks
- Tegan Lomax from the British soap opera Hollyoaks
- Jade Lovall from the British television series Casualty

=== M ===
- Katherine MacDonald from the 1938 American film Secrets of a Nurse
- Kylie Maddon from the British television series Holby City
- Chuny Marquez from the American television series ER
- Jacob Masters from the British television series Casualty
- 'New Matron' from the 1969 British comedy film Carry On Again Doctor
- Matt from the 2024- American television mockumentary sitcom St.Denis Medical
- Nurse Sandra May from the 1967 British comedy film Carry On Doctor
- Nurse Dixie McCall from the TV series Emergency!
- Lieutenant Jane "Snapshot" McCall from the 1948 American film Homecoming
- Gina McConnell from the 1965 British Hammer film Hysteria
- Lieutenant Ruth McCara from the 1953 American film Battle Circus
- Malik McGrath from the American television series ER
- Marilyn McGrath from the 1988 American television series HeartBeat; McGrath was the first portrayal of a lesbian as a main character in a prime time television show, it was also the first to portray a lesbian couple
- Misty Quigley from Yellowjackets
- Luca McIntyre from the British soap Doctors
- Siobhan McKenzie from the British television series Casualty
- Celine McQueen from the British soap opera Hollyoaks
- Cleo McQueen from the British soap Hollyoaks
- Cameron Mickelthwaite from the British television series Casualty
- Robyn Miller from the British television series Casualty
- Steve Mills from the New Zealand soap opera Shortland Street
- Marilyn Morgan from the four 1969-1971 American nurse-romance novels by Rubie Saunders, which featured a black nurse as the central character
- Dottie Morrison from the 1942 American film Parachute Nurse
- Faye Morton from the British television series Holby City
- Nurse Murchison recurring character in the twelve 1957–1999 American science fiction novels Sector General

=== N ===
- Charge Nurse Naydrad recurring character in the twelve 1957–1999 American science fiction novels Sector General
- Nurse Nelson from the 1970 American film Quarantined
- Audrey Nelson from the 1954 American science fiction comedy film The Atomic Kid
- Karen Newburn, ward sister from the British television series Holby City
- Student Nurse Nightingale from the 1959 British comedy film Carry On Nurse
- 'Night sister' from the 1969 British comedy film Carry On Again Doctor
- Bryan Nolan from the British soap opera EastEnders
- Lynsey Nolan from the British soap opera Hollyoaks
- 'Myra North, Special Nurse' title character from the 1936-1941 American NEA syndicate comic strip
- 'Nurse' from the 1967 British comedy film Carry On Doctor
- 'Nurse' from the 1972 British comedy film Carry On Matron
- 'Nurse in bath' from the British comedy films Carry On Doctor (1967) and Carry On Matron (1972)
- 'Nurses Home nurse' from the 1967 British comedy film Carry On Doctor

=== O ===
- Alyssa Ogawa from the American television series 1987-1994 Star Trek: The Next Generation and the 1996 film Star Trek: First Contact
- Ngozi Okoye from the British television series Casualty
- Joan Olson from the 1963 American film Police Nurse
- 'Out-Patients Sister' from the 1969 British comedy film Carry On Again Doctor

=== P ===
- Norma Page student nurse from the 1939 American comedy film Four Girls in White
- Pat Page student nurse in 1939 American comedy film Four Girls in White
- Alison Palmer, title nurse from the 1979 British nurse-romance novel Sister in Opposition, one of a number of books by Linda Shand, mainly published by Mills & Boon
- Lucy Papandrao from the 1982-1988 American television series St. Elsewhere
- Tom Paris from the American 1995-2001 television series Star Trek: Voyager
- Nurse Parkin from the 1967 British comedy film Carry On Doctor
- Ann Perkins from the 2009-2015 American television series Parks and Recreation
- Peter Petrelli from the American 2006-2010 television series Heroes
- Nurse Phyllida title nurse from the 1961 nurse-romance novel Nurse at Sea, one of a number of books by Juliet Shore, mainly published by Harlequin between 1958-1983
- Nina Pickering from the British 2008-2013 supernatural television series Being Human
- Pinoko from the Japanese 1970s manga, 2001-2002 animation and 1996 films Black Jack
- Poppy Pomfrey from the British 1997-2007 books, films and television series Harry Potter
- Tiffany Pratt from the New Zealand soap opera Shortland Street
- Miss Preen from the American 1939 play and 1941 film The Man Who Came to Dinner

=== R ===
- Nurse Ratched from the American 1962 novel by Ken Kesey's One Flew Over the Cuckoo's Nestl
- Mildred Ratched from the American 2020 television series Ratched
- Megan Roach from the British television series Casualty
- Robbinsc student nurse from the 1939 American comedy film Four Girls in White
- Laverne Roberts from the 2001-2010 American sitcom Scrubs
- Selina Roberts from the Australian 1984- soap opera Home and Away

=== S ===
- Tina Seabrook from the British television series Casualty
- Ann Sebastian from the 1950 American film The Sleeping City
- Serena from the 2024- American television mockumentary sitcom St. Denis Medical
- Ellie Sharpe, theatre sister, from the British television series Holby City
- Peggy Shotwell from the 1982-1988 American television series St. Elsewhere
- 'Shapely Nurse' from the 1972 British comedy film Carry On Matron
- Lucky Simpson from the British television series Holby City
- 'Sister' from the 1959 British comedy film Carry On Nurse
- 'Sister' from the 1972 British comedy film Carry On Matron
- Zac Smith from the New Zealand soap opera Shortland Street
- Miss Soaper, Matron from the British comedy films Carry On Nurse (1959), Carry On Doctor (1967), Carry On Again Doctor (1969), and Carry On Matron (1972)
- Deborah Solomon from the 1984 American film Purple Hearts
- Bobbie Spencer from the soap opera General Hospital
- Rita Stapleton Bauer from the soap opera Guiding Light
- Miss Stephens from the 1937 American film Wife, Doctor and Nurse
- Ray Sykes, senior staff nurse, from the British television series Holby City

=== T ===
- Samantha Taggart from the American television series ER
- Claire Temple from the 2015-2018 American television series Daredevil
- Mildred Thornton, from 'The Red Cross Girls', a series of ten American historical novels aimed at girls by Margaret Vandercook. In which she is the main character, of four American girls who volunteer with the American Red Cross in the First World War.
- Mikan Tsumiki from the Japanese 2010- visual novel and video game Danganronpa 2: Goodbye Despair

=== W ===
- Toni Warner from the New Zealand soap opera Shortland Street
- Elizabeth Webber from the soap opera General Hospital
- Glenda White from the 1942 American film Parachute Nurse
- Jodie Whyte from the British television series Casualty
- Chrissie Williams from the British television series Holby City
- Rory Williams from the British 1963- television series Doctor Who
- Nurse Willing from the 1969 British comedy film Carry On Again Doctor
- Tanya Woods from the 1997-2005 British soap opera Family Affairs
- 'Women's ward nurse' from the 1967 British comedy film Carry On Doctor
- Jennifer Worth a real nurse and midwife fictionalised in the 2012- British television period drama Call the Midwife
- Lydia Wright from the American television series ER

=== Y ===
- Mary Alice Young from the 2004-2012 American television series Desperate Housewives
- Young Nurse from the 1959 British comedy film Carry On Nurse

== See also ==
- Category:Fictional nurses - Wikipedia
- List of fictional doctors
