= Five Passengers from Lisbon =

Romantic suspense novel

First edition

Five Passengers from Lisbon is a romantic-suspense murder mystery written by Mignon G. Eberhart. The plot is a closed community mystery set aboard a hospital ship. The novel was published in the United States by Random House in 1946. The story was originally published in January 1946 as the serial "Murder Haunts the Ship" in Collier's magazine.

== Plot ==
Set in 1945 just after World War II, a group of Americans who had been stuck in Europe during the war are trying to get back to the U.S. They are traveling on board a Portuguese steamer ship, called Lerida, headed from Lisbon to South America. West of the Azores islands, their ship sinks in a storm. Five passengers and three crewmen escape by taking a lifeboat, and are later rescued by a U.S. Army hospital ship, the Magnolia, which was headed back home with a load of wounded soldiers. One of the Lerida's survivors had been murdered while still in the ship's lifeboat, and once aboard the hospital ship, several other survivors meet a violent end as well. The plot takes advantage of the idea at that time of Portugal "being a haven for espionage with undertones of Nazi and Resistance alliances." In finding the source of the deaths, Nazi sympathizers and Gestapo colluders are revealed and punished.

Biographer Rick Cypert notes that four of Eberhart's novels published, between 1943 and 1946, involve a number of questionable characters who are discovered to be Nazis or Nazi sympathizers. These are the books Wolf in Man's Clothing, The Man Next Door, Wings of Fear and Five Passengers from Lisbon.

== Reception ==
When in came out in 1946, Kirkus Reviews declared it "the master touch for murders with superior entertainment value."
