= Dark Garden =

Dark Garden may refer to:

- Dark Garden, a park in Narva, Estonia
- "The Dark Garden", a novel by Mignon G. Eberhart
