= While the Patient Slept =

While the Patient Slept may refer to:

- While the Patient Slept (novel), a 1930 mystery novel by Mignon G. Eberhart
- While the Patient Slept (film), a 1935 comedy murder mystery film, adapted from the novel
