= H. Lawrence Hoffman =

Book jacket designer, illustrator, and painter

H. Lawrence Hoffman (23 October 1911 – 20 January 1977) was a commercial book jacket designer, illustrator, calligrapher and painter who worked in New York City. He illustrated book covers for over 25 publishing companies, including Alfred A Knopf, Pocket Books, Popular Library, Macmillan, Simon & Schuster, The Viking Press, and Random House. Over the course of his career, he illustrated over 600 book jacket covers.

Hoffman graduated from the Rhode Island School of Design (RISD) in 1934 and then completed two years of post graduate study in Commercial Art from RISD. He moved to New York City with the $200 he was awarded for winning a competition to design a coin for the 1936 300 year Rhode Island Tercentennial. He began his career as an Art Director at the A.M. Sneider Advertising Company (1938–1941) and at Immerman Art Studios (1941–?). After leaving Immerman, he worked as a free-lance artist and book illustrator for the remainder of his career. He also taught illustration and lettering at The Cooper Union (1960-1967) and was a Professor of Art at C.W. Post University (1967–1976).

Hoffman began his career doing drawings for the pulp magazine, Thrilling Mystery Magazine, A Ned Pines publication, and book cover illustrations for the emerging mass market paperback industry that included Pocket Books, Bantam Books, and Green Dragon. Beginning around 1943, Hoffman illustrated almost all of the first 100 paperback covers for Popular Library. Hoffman repeated the cover illustration as a smaller line drawing on the title page.

In 1947, he won a prestigious commission to design the cover, frontispieces and 21 full or half page illustrations for The Canterbury Tales of Geoffrey Chaucer: A New Modern English Prose Translation by R.M.Lumiansky published in 1948 by Simon & Schuster. The book was selected as one of the 50 best books of the year by the American Institute of Graphic Arts.

Father to David Hoffman, filmmaker.

== Illustrated ==
- The Canterbury Tales of Geoffrey Chaucer Translation by R.M. Lumiansky, Simon and Schuster, New York, 1948
- Beyond the Barriers of Space and Time by Judith Merril, hard cover, Random House; 1st edition (November 1, 1954)
- Father Marquette and the Great Rivers by August Derleth, Vision Books, 1955
- Cross in the West by Mark Boesch, Vision Books 1956
- Fighting Father Duffy by Jim Bishop and Virginia Lee Bishop, Vision Books, New York, 1956
- Governor All Smith by James A. Farley and James C. G. Conniff, Vision Book, Farrar, Straus & Cudahy, New York, 1959
- More Champions in Sports and Spirit by Ed Fitzgerald (1919-2001)(sports writer, editor Sport magazine), Farrar, Straus and Cudahy, 1959
- The Canterbury Tales of Geoffrey Chaucer : a New Modern English Prose Translation, translated by R.M. Lumiansky, Hoffman, Washington Square Press, 1960, 1967
- Alien Art, by Gordon R. Dickson, hardcover, E. P. Dutton (1973)
- The Building Book: About Houses the World Over by Evelyn E. Smith, Howell Soskin publishers, New York, 1972

== Cover art ==
Some of the numerous book covers that H. Lawrence Hoffman illustrated:

- 13 White Tulips, by Frances Crane, Random House, 1953
- Lady Killer, by William Hardy, A Red Badge Mystery, Dodd, Mead & Co, 1957
- New York City Folklore, by B.A. Botkin, Random House, 1956
- African Poison Murders, by Elspeth Huxley, Popular Library, #100, 1946
- Mother Finds a Body, by Gypsy Rose Lee, Popular Library #37, 1944
- Congo Song, by Stuart Cloete, Popular Library #110, 1945
- Dead of the Night, by John Rhode, Popular Library #56, 1945
- Petro's War, by Alki Zei, E.P Dutton & co, 1972
- The Angry Hills, by Leon Uris, Random House, 1955
- The Pocket Book of Dog Stories, by Harold Berman (editor); MacKinley Kantor (introduction), Pocket Books, Inc., 1942
- The Criminal C.O.D., by Phoebe Atwood Taylor aka Alice Tilton, Popular Library 14, 1943
- Murder in Shinbone Alley, by Helen Reilly, Popular Library # 20 1st Printing, 1943
- Mutiny on the Bounty, by Charles Nordhoff and James Norman Hall, Pocket Books # 216, 1943
- McKee of Centre Street, by Helen Reilly, Popular Library paperback, 1944
- The House on the Roof, by Mignon G. Eberhart, Popular Library #17, 1944
- Mr. Pinkerton Has the Clue, by David Frome, Popular Library paperback, 1944
- The Happy Highwayman, by Leslie Charteris, Pocket Books paperback (No. 272), January 1945
- Challenge for Three, by David Garth, Popular Library # 84, 1945
- Sing a Song of Homicide, by James R. Langham, Popular Library paperback, 1945
- Murder in the Willett Family, by Rufus King, Popular Library paperback, 1945
- Sound of Revelry, by Octavus Roy Cohen, Popular Library, 1945
- The Smiler with the Knife, by Nicholas Blake, Popular Library paperback, 1945
- The Power and the Glory, by Graham Greene, Viking Press, New York, 1946
- It Ain't Hay, by David Dodge, Simon & Schuster, 1946
- Timbal Gulch Trail, by Max Brand, Popular Library paperback, 1946
- Bucky Follows a Cold Trail, by William MacLeod Raine, Popular Library paperback, 1946
- Hasty Wedding, by Mignon G. Eberhart, Popular Library paperback, 1946
- Murder in Season, by Octavus Roy Cohen, Popular Library paperback, 1946
- Rebecca, by Daphne du Maurier, Pocket Books Inc. paperback, 1946
- Drink to Yesterday, by Manning Coles, Bantam Books # 76, 1947
- Murder '97, by Frank Gruber, New York: Rinehart & Company / Murray Hill Mystery 1st Edition 1948
- Lummox, by Fannie Hurst, Popular Library #101, 1946
- City Boy: The Adventures of Herbie Bookbinder, by Herman Wouk, Simon & Schuster, 1948
- We Took to the Woods by Louise Dickinson Rich, Pocket Books, 1948
- Earth Abides, by George R. Stewart, Random House, 1949
- A Little Night Music, by Mary Jane Ward, Random House, 1951
- The Autobiography of Benjamin Franklin, Pocket Books, 1952
- The Bridges at Toko-Ri, by James A. Michener, 1953
- Bring 'em Back, by Lillian Brown, Dodd, Mead & Co, N . Y., 1956
- Kill My Love, by Kyle Hunt, Simon & Schuster; [Book club ed.] edition (1958)
- RIPLEY'S BELIEVE IT OR NOT - 6th series, by Robert L. Ripley, Pocket Books, 1959
- Widow's Mite, by Elisabeth Sanxay Holding, Simon & Schuster, An Inner Sanctum Mystery,1953
- Now We Are Enemies: The Story of Bunker Hill, by Thomas J. Fleming, St. Martin's Press, New York, 1960
- The News From Karachi, by William Wood, Macmillan, New York, 1962
- Palace Under the Sea, by Elizabeth P. Heppner, Macmillan (1963)
- The Portable Russian Reader: A collection Newly Translated from Classical and Present-day Authors, by Bernard Guilbert Guerney, The Viking Press., New York, 1964
- Modes of Thought, by Alfred North Whitehead, New York: Free Press, 1968
- Operation Manhunt, by Christopher Nicole, Holt Rinehart and Winston 1970
- Flight of Exiles, by Ben Bova, E. P. Dutton & Co., New York, NY, 1972
