= Reticker =

Reticker is a surname. Notable people with the surname include:

- Gini Reticker, American filmmaker and producer
- Hugh Reticker (1884–1969), American art director
