= The White Cockatoo (novel) =

1933 mystery novel by Mignon G. Eberhart

First edition

The White Cockatoo is a murder mystery novel written by Mignon G. Eberhart. It was published by Doubleday, Doran & Co. in 1933. It was later released in December, 1993, by Thorndike Press. The novel served as the basis of the 1935 film of the same name directed by Alan Crosland.

== Plot summary ==
Americans Sue Talley and Jim Sundean find themselves at the same large, off-season hotel in the south of France. Amidst a constant spooky, atmospheric wind, a series of murders occur; Sue begins to suspect that the deaths are connected to her arrival.

== Composition ==
Eberhart drew on her experiences traveling in the Maritime Alps and staying in just such a hotel in the winter of 1931–32. The name of the town in the book is left intentionally obscure by Eberhart, with the implication that it may be Avignon.

== Reception ==
The White Cockatoo received mixed-to-positive reviews. It was called "a thoroughly excellent thriller" by the Aberdeen Times, and similarly described as above "the ordinary blood and thunder class" by The Sunday Times.

The New York Times described The White Cockatoo as overly convoluted. The reviewer lamented the fact that Sarah Keate, the primary character of Eberhart's previous few books, did not make an appearance: "It might have been better if she had."

Among Eberhart's literary contemporaries, the novel was well received. In a private letter to Fanny Butcher, author Gertrude Stein reported that she was reading The White Cockatoo and was impressed by Eberhart's "xtraordinary" writing skill. Crime novelist Dorothy L. Sayers publicly praised the novel. A 1937 UK edition, published by The Bodley Head, carried a positive quote from Jefferson Farjeon, praising The White Cockatoo for its "most intriguing" cast of characters and its "genuinely thrilling atmosphere."
