= Hunt with the Hounds =

1950 mystery novel by Mignon G. Eberhart

First edition

Hunt With the Hounds is a mystery novel by Mignon G. Eberhart. It is one of her stand-alone mysteries. It was published as A Witness for my Love in the June & July 1950 issues of Woman's Home Companion, then published by Random House in 1950 as part of its "Detective Book Club" series. It was reprinted as a mass market paperback in 1963 by Popular Library, and in 2011 by Symonds Press (ISBN 978-1447412625).

== Plot outline ==
The action takes place in Bedford, Virginia, a fox-hunting region. The story starts out with the acquittal of Jed Bailey for the murder of his wife Ernestine. The blame is then leveled upon Sue Poore, the "other woman" in the case.
