= While the Patient Slept (film) =

1935 film by Ray Enright

- Directed by: Ray Enright
- Written by: Robert N. Lee; Eugene Solow; Brown Holmes (add. dialogue)
- Based on: the novel While the Patient Slept; 1930 novel by Mignon G. Eberhart
- Produced by: Harry Joe Brown (uncredited)
- Starring: Aline MacMahon; Guy Kibbee
- Cinematography: Arthur Edeson
- Edited by: Owen Marks
- Music by: Bernhard Kaun (uncredited)
- Distributed by: First National Pictures
- Release date: March 2, 1935
- Running time: 65-67 minutes
- Country: United States
- Language: English

While the Patient Slept is a 1935 comedy murder mystery film directed by Ray Enright starring Aline MacMahon as a nurse/crime sleuth and Guy Kibbee as her boyfriend and police detective. It is based on the novel of the same name written by Mignon G. Eberhart.

== Plot ==
A comedic murder mystery involving a nurse who is assigned to the at-home care of a man who recently had a stroke. While he is unconscious, on a dark and stormy night, a murder takes place in his bedroom. With family members and potential heirs confined to the house for several days, additional murders occur while the nurse and a police detective work on solving the case.

== Cast ==
- Aline MacMahon as Nurse Sarah Keate
- Guy Kibbee as Detective Lt. Lance O'Leary
- Lyle Talbot as Ross Lonergan
- Patricia Ellis as March Federie
- Allen Jenkins as Police Sgt. Jim Jackson
- Robert Barrat as Adolphe Federie
- Hobart Cavanaugh as Eustace Federie
- Dorothy Tree as Mittie Federie
- Henry O'Neill as Elihu Dimuck
- Russell Hicks as Dr. Jay
- Helen Flint as Isobel Federie
- Brandon Hurst as Grondal
- Eddie Shubert as Detective Muldoon
- Walter Walker as Richard Federie
- George Chandler as Evening Bulletin Reporter

== Series ==
Warner Bros. Pictures marketed 12 mystery films as components of the "Clue Club", movies tied to Black Mask, a pulp magazine, aimed at increasing audiences attending WB mystery movies. There were twelve titles bearing the Warner Bros. Pictures "Clue Club" label released from 1935 to 1938.

Clue Club #1: The White Cockatoo (1935)

Clue Club #2: While the Patient Slept (1935)

Clue Club #3: The Florentine Dagger (1935)

Clue Club #4: The Case of the Curious Bride (1935)

Clue Club #5: The Case of the Lucky Legs (1935)

Clue Club #6: The Murder of Dr. Harrigan (1936)

Clue Club #7: Murder by an Aristocrat (1936)

Clue Club #8: The Case of the Velvet Claws (1936)

Clue Club #9: The Case of the Black Cat (1936)

Clue Club #10: The Case of the Stuttering Bishop (1937)

Clue Club #11: The Patient in Room 18 (1938)

Clue Club #12: Mystery House (1938)

== Reception ==
The New York Times reviewer was unimpressed: "Mr. Kibbie and Miss MacMahon finally break the case ... but the solution is not altogether satisfactory. Neither, for that matter, is the picture. Come right down to it, it's quite unsatisfactory". Later critics also had reservations about the film, as being a lesser version of the prize-winning book: "Unfortunately, the film producers, modeling the Eberhart mystery film versions on others of the day, sought to extend humorous quips between characters and eliminate significant elements of the plot that involved clues, no doubt in hopes of attracting a broader audience".
