= South of Panama =

South of Panama may refer to:

- South of Panama (1928 film), an American silent drama film
- South of Panama (1941 film), an American action film
