= Sports film =

Film genre

A sports film is a film genre in which any particular sport plays a prominent role in the film's plot or acts as its central theme. It is a production in which a sport or a sports-related topic is prominently featured or is a focus of the plot. Despite this, sport is ultimately rarely the central concern of such films and sport performs primarily an allegorical role. Furthermore, sports fans are not necessarily the target demographic in such movies, but sports fans tend to maintain a high following and esteem for such movies.

== Early history ==
Sources disagree on the first sports film. Short reels depicting unscripted matches were publicly shown as early as 1894, while scripted shorts depicting sports were shown by the end of the decade. The first feature-length sports films would not come until later. Many of the earliest sports films are considered lost.

The first known sports film was an 1894 reel depicting a boxing match between Michael Leonard and Jack Cushing, released just four months after the first movie house opened. Several other films depicting boxing matches were released in 1894.

Some sources report The Ball Game, directed by William Heise and produced and distributed by Thomas Edison's Edison Manufacturing Company, as the first sports film. The film, a short documentary, is a recording of an 1898 game between the Reading Coal Heavers and the Newark Bears. Edison produced a short film based on the poem "Casey at the Bat" the following year.

Sources differ as to the first feature-length sports film. 1913's The Lipton Cup is a feature-length drama centered on sailing. 1915's Little Sunset was the first feature-length film depicting baseball. The first feature-length biographical film depicting a sport was Right Off the Bat, released several months after Little Sunset (some sources claim that Right Off the Bat was the first feature-length sports film). The film, directed by Hugh Reticker, depicts the life of player Mike Donlin. Donlin appears as himself in the film.

Despite their early popularity, sports films earned a reputation for frequent box-office bombs and struggled to earn the support of large production companies after their popularity in the 1930s.

== Subgenres ==
Several sub-categories of sports films can be identified, although the delineations between these subgenres, much as in live action, are somewhat fluid.

The most common sports subgenres depicted in movies are sports drama and sports comedy. Both categories typically employ playground settings, match, game creatures and other elements commonly associated with biological stories.

Sports films tend to feature a more richly developed sport world, and may also be more player-oriented or thematically complex. Often, they feature a hero of adventure origins and a clear distinction between loss and victory set against each other in a play time struggle.

Thematically, the story is often one of "our team" versus "their team"; their team will always try to win, and our team will show the world that they deserve recognition or redemption; the story does not always have to involve a team. The story could also be about an individual athlete or the story could focus on an individual playing on a team.

=== Sports comedy ===
Sports comedy combines the sports film genre with comedy film elements. Traditionally, these films heavily rely on slapstick humor and very physical comedy, such as someone getting hurt in a comical way. A typical storyline may revolve around someone losing sight of the sport they are playing and trying to get back into it. Examples and staples of the genre include The Waterboy, The Longest Yard, Talladega Nights: The Ballad of Ricky Bobby, Blades of Glory, and Goat.

=== Sports drama ===
Sports drama combines the sports film genre with drama film elements. These films rely on conflict, usually revolving around an athlete or a team. These dramas can further be broken up into categories, some movies focusing on race such as 42 (2013), or focusing on a specific moment in history like I, Tonya (2018). Examples of this overall genre/type include: Body and Soul (1947), The Hustler (1961), Rocky (1976), Hoosiers (1986), Remember the Titans (2000), Lagaan (2001), Moneyball (2011), Ford v Ferrari (2019), Ferrari (2023) and the Goal! trilogy.

== Award-winning films ==
There have been numerous sports films that have become award winning phenomena. Several films have been nominated for and won the highest award of Best Picture at the Academy Awards, including Chariots of Fire (1981), Rocky (1976), and Million Dollar Baby (2004). Other films that received awards of a high caliber are Jerry Maguire (Best Supporting Actor, 1996), Bull Durham (Best Original Screenplay, 1988), and The Karate Kid (Best Supporting Actor, 1984).

== Sources ==
- Friedman, Lester D. (2020) Sports Movies Rutgers University Press ISBN 9780813599885
- (fr) Julien Camy and Gérard Camy, ed. Du Bailli de Suffren (2016) Sport&Cinéma (1200 films, 60 sports, 80 interviews)
- Edgington, Erskine, Welsh (2010) Encyclopedia of Sports Films Scarecrow Press ISBN 9780810876538
- Allen & Hershenson (1996) Sports Movie Posters ISBN 9781887893152
