= The Unknown Quantity =

The Unknown Quantity may refer to:

- The Unknown Quantity (novel), a 1953 mystery novel by Mignon G. Eberhart
- The Unknown Quantity, a short story by O. Henry
- The Unknown Quantity (film), a lost 1919 American silent film based on the short story
