= The Man Next Door (novel) =

1943 novel by Mignon G. Eberhart

First edition

The Man Next Door is a murder mystery and espionage novel by Mignon G. Eberhart. It was published by Random House in May, 1943, and reprinted in 1976 by Popular Library and in 2004 by Chivers Press (ISBN 978-0754086543).

== Synopsis ==
Pretty Maida Lovell, secretary to war department executive Steve Blake, stops by Christine Blake's house (his widowed sister-in-law) where he is living and has his home office. She is to pick up some notes for his radio speech later that evening. She is in love with him, and jealous that Blake has been spending time with Christine's elegant penthouse-lifestyle sister, Angela Favor. She encounters - and rebuffs - prissy Walsh Rantoul in the house, who is mixing drinks and coming on to her. She goes upstairs to retrieve the notes, and Blake stops in at the same time. After Blake departs for his meeting, Maida goes downstairs to find Blake gone and Rantoul dead in the kitchen. It looks like Blake has murdered him, since they had words earlier.

A stranger who calls himself "Smith" enters. In order to protect Blake from discovery, he offers to dispose of Rantoul's body and the evidence, if Maida will find information about airplane movements for him. The information he asks for is to be public knowledge anyway, so she complies. Now she is trapped. Smith is obviously an enemy spy and he has a hold on Maida to find out more and more intelligence on wartime materiel and personnel movements.

== Reception ==
The character of Walsh Rantoul is singled out by Rick Cypert, an Eberhart biographer, as an example of the sort of queer-coded character that was favored by Eberhart. Cypert also notes that The Man Next Door is one of four Eberhart novels published, between 1943 and 1946, that involve a number of questionable characters who are discovered to be Nazis or Nazi sympathizers; the other three are Wolf in Man's Clothing, Wings of Fear, and Five Passengers from Lisbon.
