= With This Ring =

With This Ring may refer to:

- With This Ring (1925 film), an American silent film directed by Fred Windemere
- With This Ring (1978 film)
- With This Ring (2015 film)
- With This Ring (TV series), 1951
- "With This Ring" (The Platters song)
- With This Ring (novel), a 1941 mystery novel by Mignon G. Eberhart
