= The Patient in Room 18 (film) =

1938 film by Bobby Connolly

- Directed by: Bobby Connolly; Crane Wilbur
- Written by: Eugene Solow; Robertson White; Joseph Santley (uncredited)
- Produced by: Bryan Foy
- Starring: Patric Knowles; Ann Sheridan
- Cinematography: James Van Trees
- Edited by: Louis Hesse
- Music by: Bernhard Kaun
- Distributed by: Warner Bros. Pictures
- Release date: January 8, 1938
- Running time: 59 minutes
- Country: United States
- Language: English

The Patient in Room 18 is a 1938 American mystery romantic comedy film directed by Bobby Connolly and Crane Wilbur. It stars Patric Knowles and Ann Sheridan. The screenplay written by Eugene Solow and Robertson White was based on a 1929 novel of the same name by author Mignon G. Eberhart.

In the film, a private detective is hospitalized after suffering a nervous breakdown. In the hospital, a wealthy patient and the head doctor are both murdered, and valuable medicinal radium is stolen. The detective has to solve the murder mystery.

== Plot ==
Private investigator Lance O'Leary suffers a nervous breakdown from being unable to solve a case and his doctor has him hospitalized for rest. It just happens to be the same place where his lady friend, Sara Keate, is the head nurse.

The first night there a murder takes place as wealthy Mr. Warren is killed in his room and $100,000 worth of medicinal radium on his chest is stolen. Also, head doctor Dr. Lethany is murdered as well. Everyone on the staff seems to have a motive and O'Leary must work with combative Inspector Foley to solve the crime.

== Cast ==
- Patric Knowles as Lance O'Leary
- Ann Sheridan as Nurse Sara Keate
- Eric Stanley as Seymour Bentley (O'Leary's valet)
- John Ridgely as James 'Jim' Warren
- Rosella Towne as Nurse Maida Day
- Jean Benedict as Mrs. Carol Lethany
- Charles Trowbridge as Dr. Bahman
- Cliff Clark as Inspector Foley
- Harland Tucker as Dr. Arthur Lethany
- Edward Raquello as Dr. Fred 'Freddie' Harker
- Vickie Lester as Nurse Taylor
- Edward McWade as Frank Warren
- Ralph Sanford as Det. Donahue
- Frank Orth as Joe Higgins

== Release ==
The film was released theatrically by Warner Bros. Pictures in January 1938. It was never officially released on any home video format until issued by the Warner Archive Collection in October 2010 as part of the six-film DVD-R collection Warner Bros. Horror/Mystery Double Features.

The film was followed by the sequel Mystery House in May 1938.
