= The Glass Slipper (novel) =

1938 mystery novel by Mignon G. Eberhart

First edition (US)

The Glass Slipper is a 1938 American mystery novel by Mignon G. Eberhart. Like many of her novels, it features a nurse protagonist and elements of romance. The book was first sold in hardcover in New York by Doubleday, and in London through the Collins Crime Club.

== Plot summary ==
Rue, a nurse, marries a wealthy Chicago doctor whose wife she had once been attending. Later, a letter is sent to the police suggesting that the first wife was murdered. Then two more murders occur within the household of Dr. Brule Hatterick and his new wife. The first wife's brother and best friend and some of the doctor's partners are suspects. The new wife wonders if she is in danger.

== Reception ==
At the time of its publication the novel was positively reviewed in a number of newspapers, including the New York Times, whose reviewer noted: “Those who remember the Nurse Keete stories will agree that when Mrs. Eberhart writes of doctors and nurse she is at her best... Not even the Nurse Keete stories are any better than this one.”
