= Easy Money (1936 film) =

1936 film by Phil Rosen

- Directed by: Phil Rosen
- Written by: Arthur T. Horman; Paul Perez; Ewart Adamson
- Produced by: Maury M. Cohen
- Starring: Onslow Stevens; Kay Linaker; Noel Madison
- Cinematography: M.A. Anderson
- Edited by: Roland D. Reed
- Production company: Invincible Pictures
- Distributed by: Chesterfield Pictures
- Release date: June 14, 1936
- Running time: 70 minutes
- Country: United States
- Language: English

Easy Money is a 1936 American crime film directed by Phil Rosen and starring Onslow Stevens, Kay Linaker and Noel Madison.

== Cast ==
- Onslow Stevens as Dan Adams
- Kay Linaker as Carol Carter
- Noel Madison as 'Duke' Trotti
- Allen Vincent as Eddie Adams
- Barbara Barondess as Tonia
- Wallis Clark as Mr. Curtis
- Selmer Jackson as Mr. Harrison
- Robert Homans as Sam Belden
- Robert Graves as Sillsby
- Robert Frazer as Lab Man
- Broderick O'Farrell as Judge
- Barbara Bedford as Mrs. Turner
- Dickie Walters as Little Johnny
- Betty Mack as Telephone Operator
- Henry Hebert as Elmer Johnson
- John Kelly as Carney
- Monte Vandergrift as Moxey
- Allen Wood as Chick
- John Dilson as Rusick

== Bibliography ==
- Michael R. Pitts. Poverty Row Studios, 1929–1940: An Illustrated History of 55 Independent Film Companies, with a Filmography for Each. McFarland & Company, 2005.
