= Danger Money (novel) =

1974 mystery novel by Mignon G. Eberhart

- Author: Mignon G. Eberhart
- Publisher: Random House
- Publication date: 1974

Danger Money is a murder mystery novel by Mignon G. Eberhart published by Random House in 1974. It was reprinted in 1987 by Warner Books (ISBN 978-0446343930).

== Plot ==
Gilbert Manders, known to all as G.M., is a wealthy, charming, and influential financier. Yet behind his glittering success lies a truth: he owes all his success to his wife Rose, whose fortune enabled him to climb the social ladder. Today Rose is a faded woman, marred by alcohol, having gained weight, and aged poorly. To avoid embarrassing situations, G.M. has purchased a secluded country house, far from prying eyes, which he uses to meet very important people in secret.

Out of a lingering sense of duty, G.M. has placed many of Rose's relatives, the Clanser family, in positions within the household. Most of them are unreliable, heavy drinkers whose presence only adds to the atmosphere of decay.

Susan Beach, G.M.'s efficient and loyal secretary, is sent to the country house on a work errand—only to discover Rose's lifeless body inside. In the chaos that follows, Susan glimpses a man she doesn't recognize fleeing across the lawn. Soon after, Snell Clanser, the household's helicopter pilot, is found dead, likely silenced because he witnessed the escape. Susan herself, as a possible witness, becomes the next target.

As she navigates this dangerous web, Susan finds herself drawn to Greg Cameron, complicating matters of loyalty, suspicion, and unexpected romance. Meanwhile, G.M. himself declares his love for Susan, leaving her both flattered and torn.

Suspicion soon falls on Bert Prowde, the fiancé of Dora Clanser — one of Rose's heirs. But the investigation, led by Greg and Sergeant Lattrice, uncovers a more sinister truth. The fleeing figure Susan saw was John Nelson, cashier of G.M.'s company, who had been embezzling funds. Nelson's treachery was concealed by Ligon Clanser, Dora's embittered ex-husband and another of G.M.'s employees — who hoped to exploit his knowledge to gain influence and fortune.

Yet the final revelation is darker still: there had been two men fleeing the scene. One was Nelson, the embezzler. The other was Ligon himself, whose ambitions drove him to treachery.

The story closes with an unexpected twist of fate: G.M. turns to Dora, who had always longed for him, and asks her to be his wife.

== Reception ==
Publishers Weekly gave the novel a favorable notice, praising it as another strong entry in Eberhart's body of work: "Veteran suspense artist Mignon Eberhart offers her usual carefully constructed and entertaining mixture and the result is a winner." Newgate Callendar offered a more mixed assessment in The New York Times, writing: "Everything is here to delight Eberhart admirers: the rich man whose wife is murdered; a mischievous woman; a nice secretary (the heroine); romance; expert and traditional plotting. Calm and soothing, and also — dare one say it? — a bit somniferous, like an overdose of Valium."
