= Hidden Enemy =

- Directed by: Howard Bretherton
- Written by: Charles Williams; Marion Orth
- Produced by: Fred Scheld; T.R. Williams
- Starring: Warren Hull; Kay Linaker; Wilhelm von Brincken
- Cinematography: Harry Neumann
- Edited by: Robert Golden; Russell F. Schoengarth
- Music by: Edward J. Kay
- Production company: Monogram Pictures
- Distributed by: Monogram Pictures
- Release date: January 20, 1940
- Running time: 63 minutes
- Country: United States
- Language: English

Hidden Enemy is a 1940 American thriller film directed by Howard Bretherton and starring Warren Hull, Kay Linaker and Wilhelm von Brincken.

== Plot ==
A newspaper reporter encounters a gang of German spies attempting to steal industrial secrets.

== Cast ==
- Warren Hull as Bill MacGregor
- Kay Linaker as Sonia Manning
- Wilhelm von Brincken as Professor Werner
- George Cleveland as John MacGregor
- Fern Emmett as Aunt Mary
- Edward Keane as Newspaper Editor
- Willy Castello as Eric Bowman
- John Sheehan as Marden
- Herbert Corthell as Pete
- Vince Rush as Gruen
- Tristram Coffin as Newspaper Reporter
- I. Stanford Jolley as German Agent
- Paul Newlan as German Agent
- Hans Wollenberger as Mueller

== Bibliography ==
- McCarty, Clifford. Film Composers in America: A Filmography, 1911-1970. Oxford University Press, 2000.
