= Danger in the Dark =

1937 novel by Mignon G. Eberhart

First edition

Danger in the Dark is an American mystery novel by Mignon G. Eberhart. It was published by Doubleday Doran in 1937. Collins Crime Club released the book in the US with the new title Hand in Glove. A mass market paperback edition was released by MacFaden in December, 1966.

== Plot ==
On the eve of her wedding to Ben Brewer, Daphne Haviland secretly meets her true love Dennis Haviland in a springhouse on the family estate. When they arrive, they discover Ben has been murdered. Daphne and Dennis, already suspected due to their secret affair, attempt to make the killing look like a robbery gone wrong — but the cover-up is botched. As the police close in, the two must work together to unmask the real killer before they themselves are charged with murder.

== Reception ==
Kirkus Reviews covered the novel upon its original publication, noting its characteristic blending of romance and suspense. The book is considered representative of Eberhart's hallmark style — a capable female heroine navigating murder and romance in a suspenseful contemporary setting, which led critics to compare her to Agatha Christie and earned her the nickname "America's Agatha Christie."

== Sources ==
- Proquest
