= Escape the Night (novel) =

1944 mystery novel by Mignon G. Eberhart

First edition (publ. Random House)

Escape the Night is an American romantic mystery novel by Mignon G. Eberhart. It was published by Random House in 1944, and first reprinted in paperback in August 1946, by Bantam Books.

== Plot ==
After four years away in New York, Serena March rekindles a romance and uncovers foul play at her sister's historic, possibly cursed, home.

== Reception ==
The New York Times stated tepidly that "Eberhart has contrived to maintain the suspense to the very end and to provide a solution which is not too illogical."
