= Kay Linaker =

American actress and screenwriter (1913–2008)

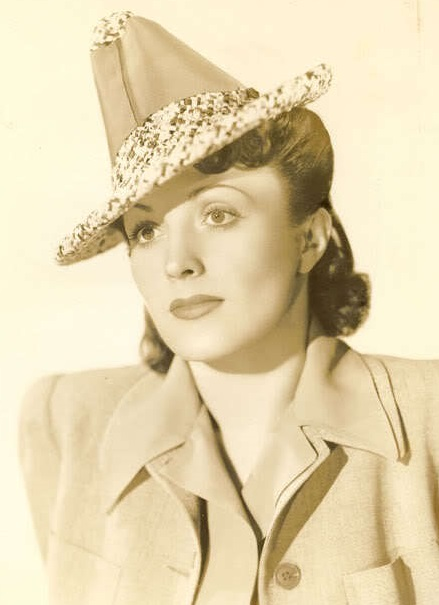
- Linaker in the 1930s
- Born: Mary Katherine Linaker; July 19, 1913; Pine Bluff, Arkansas, U.S.
- Died: April 18, 2008 (aged 94); Keene, New Hampshire, U.S.
- Other names: Kate Phillips; Kay Linaker-Phillips
- Occupations: Actress screenwriter
- Years active: 1936–1945
- Spouse: Howard Phillips (m. 1945; died 1985)
- Children: 2

Mary Katherine Linaker (July 19, 1913 – April 18, 2008) was an American actress and screenwriter who appeared in many B movies during the 1930s and 1940s, most notably Kitty Foyle (1940). Linaker used her married name, Kate Phillips, as a screenwriter, notably for the cult film The Blob (1958). She is credited with coining the name "The Blob" for the movie, which was originally titled The Molten Meteor.

== Biography ==
Linaker was born in Pine Bluff, Arkansas and graduated from a private school in Connecticut and from New York University. She went on to attend the American Academy of Dramatic Arts.

Linaker acted in supporting roles on Broadway before signing a film contract with Warner Bros. She was signed by the studio after a talent scout saw her in Jackson White at the Providencetown Theater. Her Broadway credits included Every Man for Himself (1940), and Yesterday's Orchids (1934).

In 1935, she briefly changed her name to Lynn Acker "for screen purposes", but she soon dropped that name. Most of her film work had her in limited roles, with one of her notable leading parts coming in The Girl from Mandalay (1936). Her screen debut was in The Murder of Dr. Harrigan (1936).

Linaker wrote for the Voice of America during World War II in addition to working for the Red Cross.

She later taught in the film studies department at Keene State College in New Hampshire from 1980 to 2006.

From the 1960s to her death, Linaker dedicated much of her time to education. She went on to teach acting and screenwriting at Hampshire Country School in Rindge, New Hampshire.

== Personal life ==
Linaker – on June 9, 1953, in Bedford, New York – married Howard Baron Phillips (1909–1985), who initially was a baritone and writer but later worked as an executive with NBC television. In December 1936, for about a year, Phillips sang with Ray Noble under the pseudonym Howard Barrie.

See "I've Got My Love to Keep Me Warm"

== Death ==
On April 18, 2008, Linaker died in Keene, New Hampshire.

== Partial filmography ==
- The Murder of Dr. Harrigan (1936) - Sally Keating
- Road Gang (1936) - Barbara Winston
- The Girl from Mandalay (1936) - Jeanie Barton
- Easy Money (1936) - Carol Carter
- Crack-Up (1936) - Mrs. Fleming
- The Outer Gate (1937) - Lois Borden
- Black Aces (1937) - Sandy McKenzie
- Charlie Chan at Monte Carlo (1937) - Joan Karnoff
- Personal Secretary (1938) - Flo Sampson
- The Last Warning (1938) - Carla Rodriguez
- I Am a Criminal (1938) - Linda La Rue
- Trade Winds (1938) - Grace (uncredited)
- Young Mr. Lincoln (1939) - Mrs. Edwards (uncredited)
- Charlie Chan in Reno (1939) - Mrs. Russell
- Man About Town (1939) - Receptionist (uncredited)
- Hotel for Women (1939) - Jane (uncredited)
- Girl from Rio (1939) - Vicki
- Charlie Chan at Treasure Island (1939) - Egyptian Princess Ectoplasm (uncredited)
- Drums Along the Mohawk (1939) - Mrs. Demooth
- Heaven with a Barbed Wire Fence (1939) - Nurse
- Hidden Enemy (1940) - Sonia Manning
- Green Hell (1940) - Woman in Cafe (uncredited)
- Free, Blonde and 21 (1940) - Mrs. John Crane
- Buck Benny Rides Again (1940) - Brenda Tracy
- Charlie Chan's Murder Cruise (1940) - Mrs. Pendleton
- Sandy Is a Lady (1940) - Mrs. Porter, Writer's Wife
- Mystery Sea Raider (1940) - Flossie La Mare
- Kitty Foyle (1940) - Veronica Strafford
- The Invisible Woman (1940) - Showroom Buyer (uncredited)
- They Dare Not Love (1941) - Barbara Murdock
- Blood and Sand (1941) - Guest of Doña Sol (uncredited)
- Charlie Chan in Rio (1941) - Helen Ashby
- Private Nurse (1941) - Helene
- Married Bachelor (1941) - Minor Role (uncredited)
- Moon Over Her Shoulder (1941) - Radio Hostess (uncredited)
- Cadet Girl (1941) - Minor Role (scenes deleted)
- Glamour Boy (1941) - Mrs. Emily Colder
- Remember the Day (1941) - Society Reporter (uncredited)
- A Close Call for Ellery Queen (1942) - Margo Rogers
- The Night Before the Divorce (1942) - Hedda Smythe
- Men of Texas (1942) - Mrs. Sarah Olsen
- Orchestra Wives (1942) - Margie (uncredited)
- War Dogs (1942) - Joan Allen
- Pittsburgh (1942) - Secretary (uncredited)
- Happy Go Lucky (1943) - Suzanne (uncredited)
- Cinderella Swings It (1943) - Madame Dolores
- Two Weeks to Live (1943) - Mrs. Madge Carmen
- The More the Merrier (1943) - Miss Allen (uncredited)
- Let's Face It (1943) - Canteen Hostess (uncredited)
- Wintertime (1943) - Wife (uncredited)
- Lady in the Dark (1944) - Liza's Mother
- Men on Her Mind (1944) - Eloise Palmer
- It Happened Tomorrow (1944) - Anniversary Party Attendee (uncredited)
- Laura (1944) - Woman (uncredited)
- Here Come the Waves (1944) - Pretty Woman (uncredited)
- Bring On the Girls (1945) - Commander's Wife (uncredited) (final film role)
