= Speak No Evil (Eberhart novel) =

1941 mystery novel by Mignon G. Eberhart

- First edition (US)
- Author: Mignon G. Eberhart
- Language: English
- Genre: Mystery
- Publisher: Random House
- Publication date: 1941
- Publication place: United States

Speak No Evil is an American mystery novel by Mignon G. Eberhart. It was published by Random House in 1941, and was issued in the UK by Collins Crime Club. It was reissued in hardcover by Amereon House in 1995.

== Background ==
This was the first of two novels by Eberhart to be set in Jamaica, the other being Enemy in the House. This work was completed in late 1939, shortly before the author and her husband traveled to Jamaica in November of that year; this trip was used for research, so that Eberhart could appropriately capture the location's atmosphere.

== Plot summary ==
When wealthy Richard Dakin is murdered while on vacation in Jamaica. Suspicion immediately falls upon Elizabeth, his new and much younger bride. To complicated matters, Elizabeth used to be romantically involved with Richard's nephew, Dyke Sanders, and appears to still carry a torch for him. Richard's ex-wife, Charmain, and his assistant, Ruth Reddington, soon get mixed up in the case as well.

== Reception ==
Kirkus Review called Speak No Evil a "velvet smooth concoction that doesn't deviate far from previous successful patterns." The New York Times, praised Speak No Evil as "a well-told and interesting mystery story, with a situation of excellent intricacy and with real subtlety of character drawings. Hearty applause!" The Times closed its review by calling the novel "one of the best of the author's tales."

In a twenty-first century queer reading of the text, Rick Cypert points to the character of Dyke Sanders (the female protagonist's effete former boyfriend) as a typical example of Eberhart's use of queer-coded characters.
