= Edward Raquello =

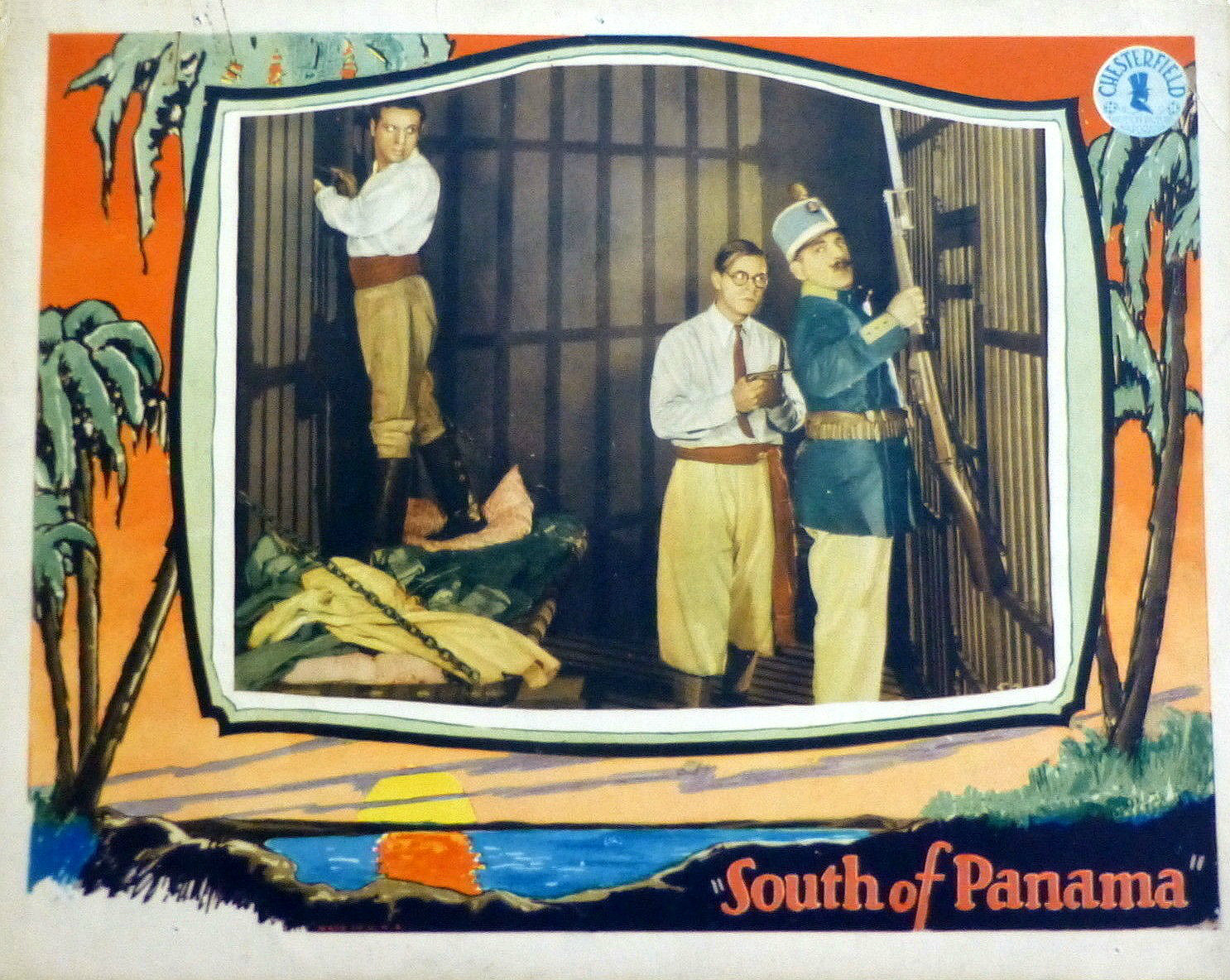
- Lobby card from South of Panama (1928) with Edward Raquello at left
- Born: Edward Zylberberg Kucharski; 14 May 1900; Warsaw, Congress Poland
- Died: 24 August 1976 (aged 76); New York City
- Citizenship: Poland, United States
- Occupation: Actor
- Years active: 1927–1940 (film); 1951 (television)

Edward Raquello (born Edward Zylberberg Kucharski; 14 May 1900 – 24 August 1976) was a Polish-American actor of stage and screen.

Raquello immigrated to the United States in March 1926. Although from Eastern Europe, he specialized in playing Latin Lover roles in Hollywood. He also performed frequently on the stage. For instance, in 1931, he was in the cast of Wonder Bar, headlined by Al Jolson. In 1932, he was in New York to Cherbourg at the Forrest Theatre, New York City. In 1933, he appeared with Rose Hobart and Humphrey Bogart at the Booth Theatre in the comedy, Our Wife. In June 1934, he co-starred with Betty Bronson in Genius in Love at the Elverhoj Theatre in Kingston, New York. In January 1935, he starred as Al Pomo, Public Enemy Number One, in Nowhere Bound, a melodrama about undesirable aliens on board a deportation train; written by Leo Birinski, it was presented at the Imperial Theatre in New York City. In 1936 and 1937, he was in the original production of Idiot's Delight with Alfred Lunt and Lynn Fontanne. In 1941, he was in the touring company of There Shall Be No Night, in a cast headed by Alfred Lunt and Lynn Fontanne. Following the end of the Second World War and through the 1960s, he was a program director and executive producer at the Voice of America radio for the United States Information Agency.

== Filmography ==
| Year | Title | Role | Notes |
|---|---|---|---|
| 1927 | The Girl from Rio | Raoul the dancer | |
| 1928 | South of Panama | Emilio Cervantes | |
| 1937 | Charlie Chan at Monte Carlo | Paul Savarin | |
| 1938 | The Patient in Room 18 | Dr. Fred Harker | |
| 1938 | The Last Express | Paul Zarinka | |
| 1938 | Torchy Gets Her Man | Henchman Gonzales | Uncredited |
| 1938 | Western Jamboree | Don Carlos | |
| 1939 | Idiot's Delight | Chiari | Uncredited |
| 1939 | Missing Daughters | Lucky Rogers | |
| 1939 | The Girl from Mexico | Tony Romano | |
| 1939 | The Girl and the Gambler | Rodolfo Ramos | |
| 1940 | Calling Philo Vance | Eduardo Grassi | |

== Bibliography ==
- Hanke, Ken. Charlie Chan at the Movies: History, Filmography, and Criticism. McFarland, 1990.
