= The Hangman's Whip =

1940 novel by Mignon G. Eberhart

First edition

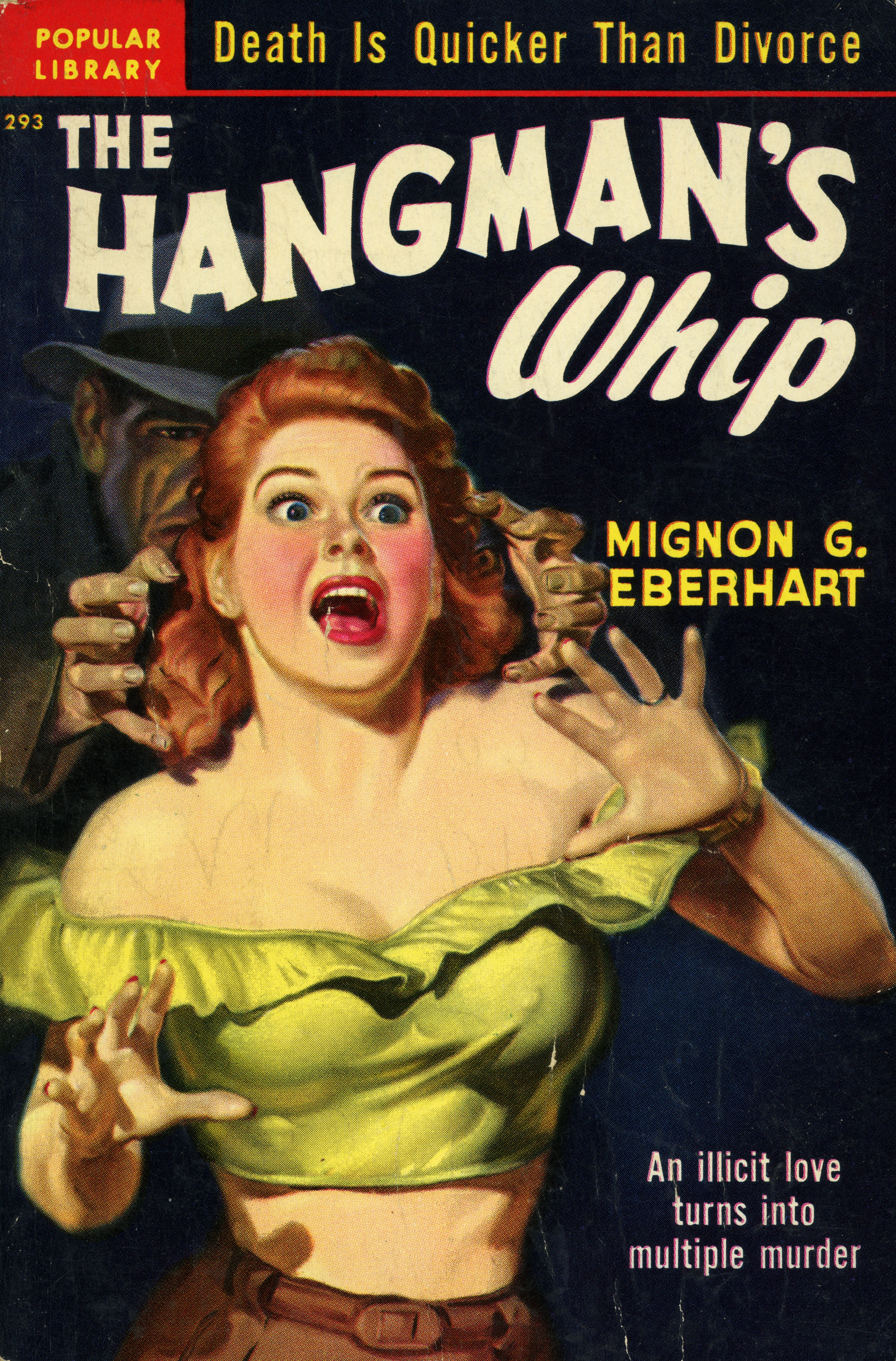
Popular Library 293 - The Hangman's Whip (Mignon G. Eberhart)

The Hangman's Whip is an American mystery novel by Mignon G. Eberhart. It was published by Doubleday, Doran in 1940 and would be the last of Eberhart's novels with the company before moving to Random House.

== Plot ==
A young Chicago socialite named Search Abbott still carries a torch for Richard Bohan, an old flame who has since married. Declining the marriage proposal of another man, Search is reunited with Richard, who promises that his marriage is over. When Richard's covetous wife Eve turns up dead, however, everyone but Search naturally assumed that Richard is to blame.

== Reception ==
The book received mostly positive reviews. Isaac Anderson's New York Times review said of The Hangman's Whip: "The suspense in this story mounts steadily from the beginning to the dramatic climax. Mignon Eberhart, who has written many excellent mystery stories, has seldom, if ever, produced one better than The Hangman's Whip."

Eberhart herself was extremely critical of the first edition dust jacket, describing it as "hideous" in her private correspondence.
