= Little Italy (1921 film) =

1921 film

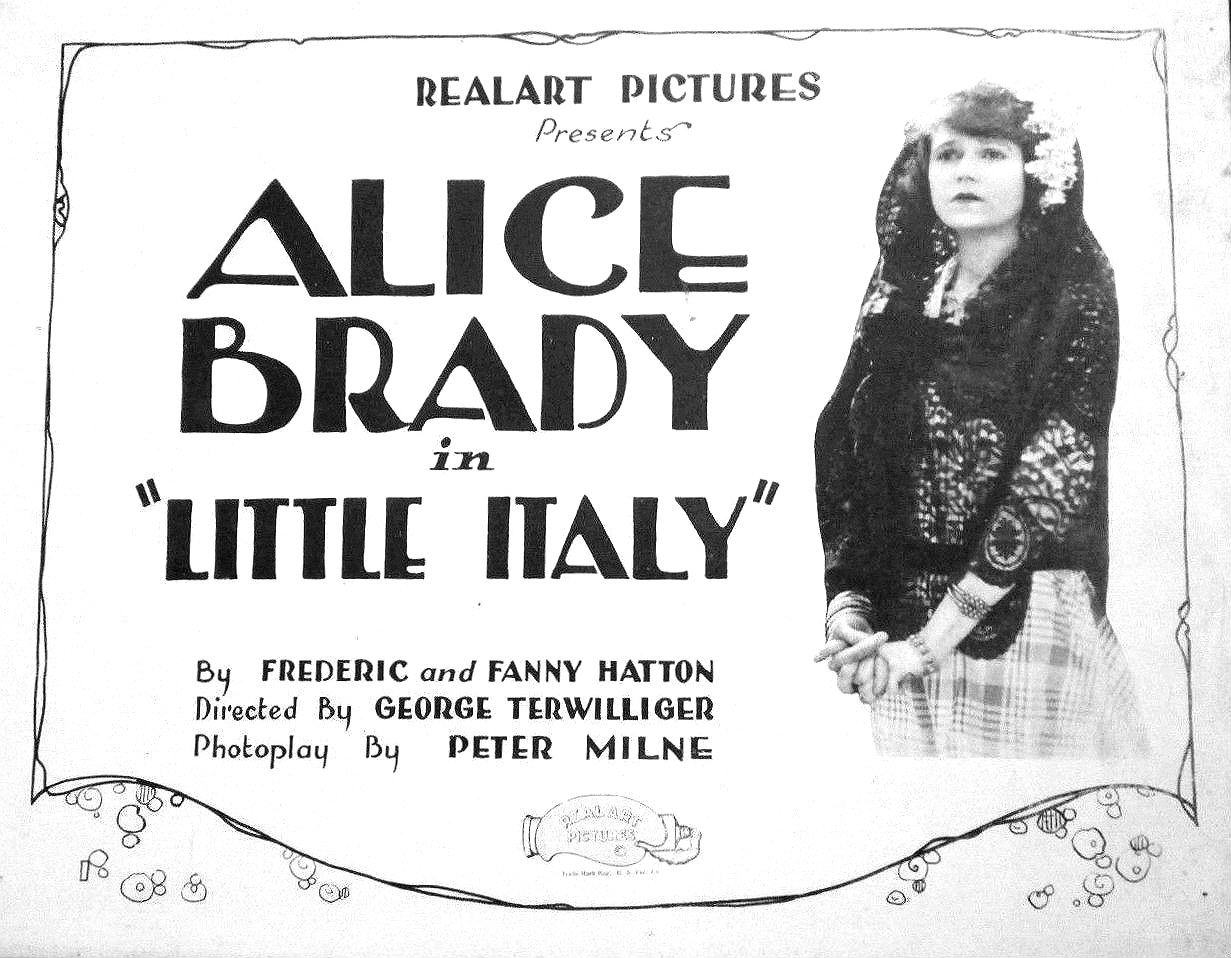
- Lobby card
- Directed by: George Terwilliger
- Screenplay by: Tom McNamara; Peter Milne
- Story by: Frederic Hatton; Fanny Hatton
- Starring: Alice Brady; Norman Kerry; George Fawcett; Jack Ridgeway; Gertrude Norman; Luis Alberni
- Cinematography: Gilbert Warrenton
- Production company: Realart Pictures Corporation
- Distributed by: Realart Pictures Corporation
- Release date: July 1921
- Running time: 50 minutes
- Country: United States
- Language: Silent (English intertitles)

Little Italy is a 1921 American comedy film directed by George Terwilliger and written by Tom McNamara and Peter Milne. The film stars Alice Brady, Norman Kerry, George Fawcett, Jack Ridgeway, Gertrude Norman, and Luis Alberni. The film was released in July 1921 by Realart Pictures Corporation.

== Cast ==
- Alice Brady as Rosa Mascani
- Norman Kerry as Antonio Tumullo
- George Fawcett as Marco Mascani
- Jack Ridgeway as Father Kelly
- Gertrude Norman as Anna
- Luis Alberni as Ricci
- Marguerite Forrest as Bianca
