= Larry Ashmead =

American book editor

Ashmead during 2004.

Lawrence Peel "Larry" Ashmead (July 4, 1932 – September 3, 2010) was an American book editor who helped create many books featuring such authors as Isaac Asimov, Quentin Crisp, Tony Hillerman, Susan Isaacs, Michael Korda, and Helen Van Slyke, for a series of publishers including Doubleday, Simon & Schuster, Lippincott, Harper & Row and its successor HarperCollins.

Ashmead was born on July 4, 1932, in Rochester, New York. He later recalled having been a model for a Kodak photograph and then seeing an enlargement of his picture blown up to billboard size when visiting Grand Central Terminal and assumed that they did that for all visitors. When he was nine years old he heard a writer speak at a local library and was less fascinated by the author's writing than by the fact that he worked amid the skyscrapers of Manhattan editing books. He attended the University of Rochester and quit after two years to serve in the United States Army. After completing his military service, he studied for a doctorate in geology from Yale University as part of a program where the cost of his education was covered by an oil company. He did not complete his Ph.D, and though he was expected to work for the company after completing his education, he decided to abandon the topic, making what he called the "only bold decision of my life".

He began work as an assistant for Doubleday, where his scientific education resulted in him being given an assignment to work on a book written by Isaac Asimov in which Ashmead identified many apparent errors that he discussed with the author. Though Asimov was able to show in almost all cases that his writing was correct, he was impressed that anyone would devote so much attention to a manuscript and asked that Ashmead be assigned to edit his books. Asimov dedicated both the Old and New Testament volumes of his book Asimov's Guide to the Bible to Ashmead.

Ashmead would place advertisements in newspapers in towns where he was going to visit and would listen to proposals for books. He was receptive to book ideas generated by co-workers, and published several books for Kate Morgenroth, a fellow employee at Harper. He met business executive Helen Van Slyke at a dinner party and later published several of her books, which sold in the millions. While visiting London, Ashmead saw a proposal for a book about the Oxford English Dictionary that was going to be rejected by the publisher. Ashmead said "I can make this a bestseller" and worked with the author, Simon Winchester, to create the bestselling book The Professor and the Madman.

Susan Isaacs credited him with the success of her books, saying in addition to "finding what was wrong", Ashmead "also knew what wasn't there". Michael Korda, a novelist who was editor-in-Chief of Simon & Schuster and whose books were edited by Ashmead, said he had "possibly the most clear and precise idea of what should be a book and how to get at it that I've ever known in an editor" and credited Ashmead with publishing 100 books a year, when many could only produce 20 each year.

After retiring from editing, he composed the 2007 book Bertha Venation: And Hundreds of Other Funny Names of Real People, published by HarperCollins, featuring such people as Hedda Lettuce and Stan Dupp, as well as a dentist named Dr. Fang and Cardinal Jaime Sin of the Philippines.

A resident of Stuyvesant, New York, Ashmead died at age 78 on September 3, 2010, in Columbia County, New York due to pneumonia. His partner, Walter Mathews, had died during 2004.

During 2010, The Ashmead Award was created to nurture the career of a promising young editor, as an effort to recognize and continue the tradition of Ashmead’s long history of mentoring young editors and helping them develop their careers in publishing. Winners of the award are given a scholarship to attend the Yale Publishing course.
