= Enemy in the House =

1962 mystery novel by Mignon G. Eberhart

First edition

Enemy in the House is a murder mystery novel by Mignon G. Eberhart published by Random House in 1962. It was reprinted in 1976 by I. Henry (ISBN 978-0860250883).

== Plot ==
The action takes place in South Carolina and Jamaica during the time of the American Revolution. Amity Mallam, the daughter of a plantation-owning family, enters a secret marriage in order to protect her inheritance. Her journey is set in motion when two of the ceremony's attendees, the priest and a lawyer, are murdered. Once in Jamaica, Amity, along with her father and her brother, are aided by a beautiful Obeah slave woman named Selene.

== Background ==
Eberhart is thought to have used her experience traveling through Jamaica in the 1940s to develop this novel. This same trip was used by the author to flesh out the atmosphere of Speak No Evil.

== Reception ==
The novel receive positive reviews from sources like the Bangor Daily News, for which Marion F. French wrote "No one can touch Eberhart for color and persuasiveness in this genre." Athenley Jones gave it a less favorable review, stating that "the story does not quite come off."

In his essay on queer coding in Eberhart's novels, Rick Cypert points to the character of Neville as a character who is typical of her depictions of subtextually-gay male characters. Cypert and co-author James McManaway single out the character of Selene for notability as one of only two non-white characters in Eberhart's later work who perform any sort of detective work; the only other Eberhart novel to boast such a character is El Rancho Rio (1970).
