= Three's a Crowd (1945 film) =

1945 film by Lesley Selander

- Theatrical release poster
- Directed by: Lesley Selander
- Screenplay by: Dane Lussier
- Produced by: Walter H. Goetz
- Starring: Pamela Blake; Charles Gordon; Gertrude Michael; Pierre Watkin; Virginia Brissac; Ted Hecht
- Cinematography: William Bradford
- Edited by: Tony Martinelli
- Production company: Republic Pictures
- Distributed by: Republic Pictures
- Release date: May 23, 1945
- Running time: 58 minutes
- Country: United States
- Language: English

Three's a Crowd is a 1945 American mystery film directed by Lesley Selander, written by Dane Lussier, and starring Pamela Blake, Charles Gordon, Gertrude Michael, Pierre Watkin, Virginia Brissac and Ted Hecht. It was released on May 23, 1945, by Republic Pictures. The film was based on the novel Hasty Wedding by Mignon G. Eberhart.

== Plot ==
A woman is accused of killing her former fiancé. She then marries a man who is also a suspect in that murder. The former fiancé turns out to have already been married, then his wife is murdered, as is the family lawyer. Who is setting up whom?

== Cast ==
- Pamela Blake as Diane Whipple
- Charles Gordon as Jeffrey Locke
- Gertrude Michael as Sophie Whipple
- Pierre Watkin as Marcus Pett
- Virginia Brissac as Cary Whipple
- Ted Hecht as Jacob Walte
- Grady Sutton as Willy Davaney
- Tom London as Grayson
- Roland Varno as Ronald Drew
- Frank O'Connor as Policeman
- Anne O'Neal as Mamie
- Bud Geary as Detective
- Eva Novak as Matron
- Nanette Vallon as Mme. Francine
