= Popular Library =

- Parent company: Perfect Film and Chemical (1968–1970); Fawcett Publications (1970–1977); CBS (1977–1982); Warner Books (1982–1996); Time Warner Book Group (1996–2006); Hachette Book Group USA (2006–)
- Status: Dormant
- Founded: 1942
- Founder: Leo Margulies; Ned Pines
- Fiction genres: Mystery
- Imprints: Questar

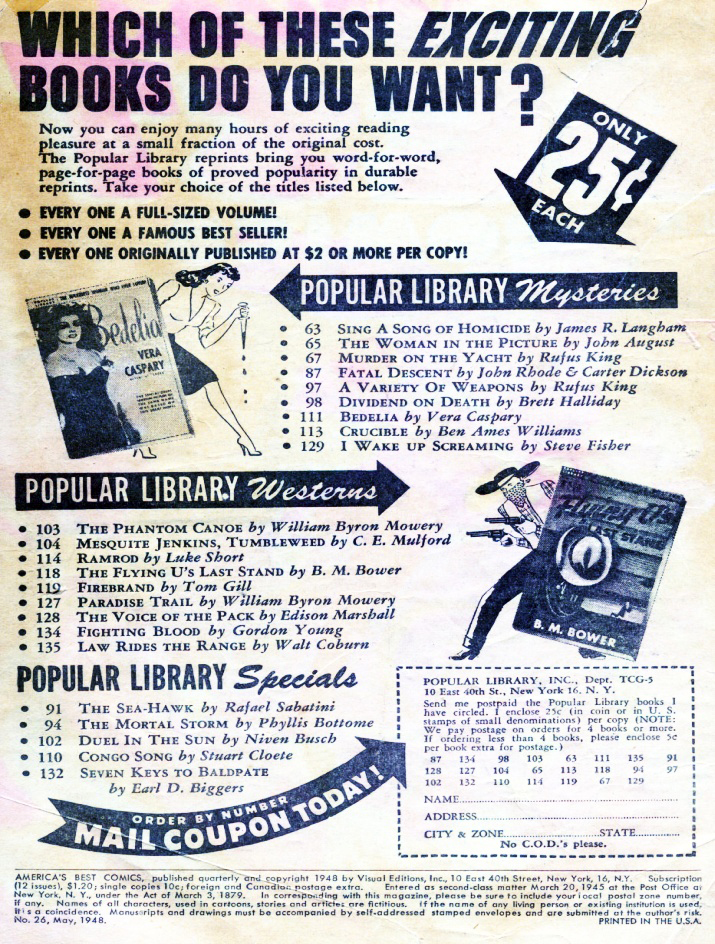
1948 advertisement

This early Popular Library book (#147) is now a favorite among collectors.

Popular Library is a New York paperback book company established in 1942 by Leo Margulies and Ned Pines, who at the time were major pulp magazine and newspaper publishers. The company's logo of a pine tree was a tribute to Pines, and another Popular Library signature visual was a reduced black-and-white copy of the front cover on the title page.

A native of Malden, Massachusetts, Pines became the president of Pines Publications in 1928 and continued to lead the company until 1961. He was the president of Popular Library from 1942 to 1966 and its chairman from 1966 to 1968. Retiring in 1971, he continued to work as a consultant.

== History ==
Popular Library was founded in 1942 as a detective-story reprint paperback book company. Popular expanded to publish most genres. In February 1962, the company announced it was issuing a public offering of 127,500 common shares at $8 a share, through Sutro Bros. & Company. Ned Pines was retaining 318,000 shares representing 68.3 percent of the 466,000 shares outstanding. Perfect Film and Chemical Corporation purchased Popular Library in 1968. The company, which also had the Curtis Books imprint, was sold in 1970 to Fawcett Publications. Popular won the Carey Thomas Award in 1976 for distinguished fiction in mass-market publishing under editorial director Patrick O'Connor. In 1977, CBS Publications purchased Popular Library and Fawcett Books. CBS then renewed the copyright of the Standard/Better/Nedor/Popular 1950s pulps library and the various Captain Marvel titles.

In 1982, CBS Publications sold off Popular Library to Warner Communications. In April 1985, Warner Books relaunched Popular Library starting out with five other books plus the reprint of Question of Upbringing continuing each month with the follow volumes from A Dance to the Music of Time series by Anthony Powell. In addition, two books would be issued per month from Popular's new imprint, Questar, for science fiction.

== Writers and illustrators ==
Although Popular Library embraced all genres, it was notable for publishing a wide variety of mystery authors. The line-up of Popular Library novelists included Mary Roberts Rinehart, John Dickson Carr, Anthony Powell, P. D. James, Harper Lee, Helen Van Slyke, Margaret Atwood, Margaret Drabble, Jean Rhys, Ann Beattie, Taylor Caldwell, Anne Tyler, Craig Rice, Cornell Woolrich, Sam Cherry, Octavus Roy Cohen, Mignon G. Eberhart, Ernest Haycox, Rufus King, Arthur Miller and John Steinbeck. Popular Library’s first 100 covers were all by the same artists, H. Lawrence Hoffman and Sol Immerman. The cover art became more eye-catching and vivid with the addition of illustrators Rudolph Belarski, Earle K. Bergey and Rafael DeSoto. John Erskine's The Private Life of Helen of Troy is an early Popular Library title with conspicuous cover art and blurb ("Her lust caused the Trojan War") which made it eagerly sought by collectors.

== See also ==
- Standard Comics - Pine's comic book company
- Thrilling Publications - Pine's pulp magazine company
