= Mystery House (film) =

1938 film by Noel M. Smith

- Directed by: Noel M. Smith
- Screenplay by: Sherman L. Lowe; Robertson White
- Based on: Mystery of Hunting's End; 1930 novel by Mignon G. Eberhart
- Produced by: Jack L. Warner; Hal B. Wallis
- Starring: Dick Purcell; Ann Sheridan; Anne Nagel
- Cinematography: L. William O'Connell
- Edited by: Frank Magee
- Music by: Howard Jackson
- Distributed by: Warner Brothers-First National Productions
- Release date: May 21, 1938
- Running time: 56 minutes
- Country: United States
- Language: English

Mystery House is a 1938 American mystery crime film directed by Noel M. Smith and starring Dick Purcell and Ann Sheridan as nurse Sarah Keate, and is based on the 1930 novel The Mystery of Hunting's End by Mignon G. Eberhart. Sheridan also played the same character in The Patient in Room 18, released in January 1938, while Aline MacMahon played her in While the Patient Slept in 1935.

In the film, a banker announces that he has discovered an embezzlement scheme. He is murdered shortly after his announcement. His daughter assigns a private detective to investigate the case. But a series of murders begins, with the suspects being targeted.

== Plot ==
At a hunting lodge retreat, banker Hubert Kingery announces to five fellow officers that one of them has forged documents and embezzled $500,000. Before the evening is over, Kingery is shot dead and the police officially rule it a suicide. Kingery's daughter Gwen does not agree and asks for help from her aunt's nurse, Sarah Keate who suggests her detective boyfriend, Lance O'Leary, for the case. O'Leary has all of the suspects return to the lodge and begins his investigation. Stuck in the snowbound shelter, the suspects and victims begin to pile up.

Gwen invites everyone who was present the evening of her father's death to spend a weekend in the country. Shortly after the guests leave for an afternoon of hunting, Helen Page dies in what seems to be another suicide. Helen's husband, Joe, had recently asked for a divorce to marry another woman. Lance investigates and learns that Helen was strangled and was shot after her death to make it look like suicide. Gwen visits Gerald Frawley in his room. After she leaves, Gerald removes his toupee and is shot just as Kingery was. Sarah finds a letter Gerald wrote to Gwen, stating that the "key" is in his toupee.

Lance believes Lucy Kingery, who uses a wheelchair, can actually walk. He tricks her into revealing this and learns that she stole Gerald's toupee, which has the combination of his safe written inside it. As soon as Lance and Lucy leave the room, Bruker, the family chauffeur, rushes in and copies the combination. After ruling out the chauffeur, Lance catches him in the act of opening the safe. Bruker confesses that six years earlier he had stolen some money from Kingery's office. Kingery had him sign a confession to ensure that he would stay straight, and he wanted to remove it before anyone saw it. Lance discovers that a gun on the wall, hung as a decoration, has been rigged to fire if the office door is bolted.

Lance brings the eight suspects into the office and tells them that one of them committed all three murders. He asks Barre to bolt the door, then bolts it himself. Barre recoils before the gun fires. When Lance starts to arrest him, Barre socks him and holding a gun on the roomful of people, flees. He gets into a fight with the Bruker, and the dog attacks him when he runs to the gun rack. While Lance and Barre are rolling around on the floor, Lucy gets out of her wheelchair, grabs a vase—and hits Lance by mistake. The other men apprehend Barre.

Sarah tends to Lance's head wound. She asks for an explanation. Lance found a paper in Kingery's safe accusing Barre of forging some securities so he could lavish the proceeds on Helen. Gerald told Helen about the crime, and they both became Barre's victims. Lance and Sarah are about to kiss when Lucy calls for her medicine. Lance points out that now she can walk, the exercise will be good for her. She rolls away in a huff and Lance and Sarah resume the kiss.

== Cast ==
- Dick Purcell as Lance O'Leary
- Ann Sheridan as Nurse Sarah Keate
- Anne Nagel as Gwen Kingery
- William Hopper as Lal Killian
- Anthony Averill as Julian Barre
- Dennie Moore as Annette the Maid
- Hugh O'Connell as Newell Morse
- Ben Welden as Gerald Frawley
- Sheila Bromley as Terice Von Elm
- Elspeth Dudgeon as Aunt Lucy Kingery
- Anderson Lawler as Joe Page
- Jean Benedict as Helen Page
- Trevor Bardette as Bruker the Chauffeur
- Eric Stanley as Hubert Kingery

== Release ==
The film was released theatrically by Warner Brothers in May 1938 as part of the Clue Club mystery series. It was never officially released on any home video format until issued by the Warner Archive Collection in October 2010 as part of the six-film DVD-R collection Warner Bros. Horror/Mystery Double Features.

== Reception ==
Frank S. Nugent gave the film a short-but-not-sweet review in The New York Times on June 29, 1938: “Picking our way gingerly past the three corpses cluttering up the Palace's "Mystery House," we come to that scene in which the chief lurker-about ransacks the detective's luggage, takes his gun and with its butt-end knocks the sleuth cold as he opens the door. After a charitable interval, the detective regains consciousness, seizes his assailant—who is still clutching the tell-tale weapon—and demands an explanation. "I didn't want to be unarmed in a house full of murderers," the suspect says. "Do you believe his story?" asks the heroine. "It's weak in spots," the detective replies. So is "Mystery House" and the spots are pretty big.”
