= The House on the Roof =

1935 mystery novel by Mignon G. Eberhart

- First edition cover
- Author: Mignon G. Eberhart
- Publisher: Doubleday, Doran & Co.
- Publication date: 1935

The House on the Roof is a murder mystery novel written by Mignon G. Eberhart. It was published in the United States by Doubleday, Doran & Co. in 1935. As with many of Eberhart's novels, it was most recently in print through the University of Nebraska Press.

== Plot ==
Mary Monroe, an opera singer, is shot dead one evening in her penthouse apartment. Another tenant of the building, Deborah Cavert, was present at the time of the murder, and must now prove her own innocence.

== Reception ==
Kirkus Reviews lauded The House on the Roof as an "A-1 mystery" with "a successfully sustained atmosphere of horror" throughout. Isaac Anderson of the New York Times described is as "a Class A mystery, which is what we have learned to expect from Mrs. Eberhart."

In his essay on LGBT coding in Eberhart's work, Rick Cypert argues that the character of Francis Maly is the most overtly sinister example of the effeminate characters favored by the author.
