= Helen Van Slyke =

American fashion executive and romance novelist

- Born: Helen Lenore Vogt; July 9, 1919; Washington, D.C.
- Died: July 3, 1979 (aged 59); New York City
- Spouse: William Woodward Van Slyke (m. 1946; divorced in 1952)
- Writing career
- Genre: Romance novel

Helen Lenore Van Slyke (née Vogt; 1919 – 1979) was an American writer.

Van Slyke was born on July 9, 1919, in Washington, D.C. She began her career working at the Washington Daily News where she sold advertising. She went on to become the fashion editor for the Washington Evening Star, working there from 1938 to 1943.

Van Slyke worked for Glamour magazine from 1945 to 1960, followed by positions at Henri Bendel department store, Norman, Craig & Kummel advertising agency, and Genesco's House of Fragrance.

Van Slyke was encouraged to write romantic novels by Lawrence P. Ashmead, an editor at Doubleday. Her first novel The Rich and the Righteous was published in 1971.

Her novels appeared on the New York Times Best Seller list, including her 1979 novel, A Necessary Woman and the 1980 novel, No Love Lost which appeared posthumously.

Van Slyke died on July 3, 1979, in New York City.
