= Murder by an Aristocrat (novel) =

1932 novel

- First edition (US)
- Author: Mignon G. Eberhart
- Language: English
- Genre: Thriller
- Publisher: Doubleday Doran
- Publication date: 1932
- Publication place: United States
- Media type: Print

Murder by an Aristocrat is a 1932 mystery thriller novel by the American writer Mignon G. Eberhart.

== Plot ==
On a summer night, nurse Sarah Keate is called to the Thatcher house at the request of Dr. Daniel Bouligny to care for a member of the family who has injured his shoulder with a gun. The patient is Bayard, a cousin of the owners and a temporary guest. When Sarah begins her duties, however, Bayard instructs her to take certain precautions, saying he feels threatened. He hints that he did not wound himself but refuses to name the person responsible. That night, Sarah cannot sleep; she thinks she sees someone on the balcony of the room.

The next morning, the patient makes a strange request: he tells Sarah to go down to breakfast but to lock him in, so that no one can enter his room. Sarah knows everyone in the household except Dave, who has gone to the cemetery.

In the afternoon, invited to rest in the garden, she sits on a bench facing the front door and watches as all the family members and guests leave the house at intervals of a few minutes. The house remains empty except for Bayard, the housekeeper Emmeline, and the gardener Higby. After four o'clock, people begin returning one by one, until Emmeline lets out a terrible scream — she has found Bayard shot dead in the library. It is assumed to be the work of a thief, since the family jewels are missing, but Sarah has seen no one, nor have Emmeline or Higby. The doctor and sheriff both conclude it was a robbery committed by an unknown intruder — though they are relatives of the Thatchers and would never embarrass them publicly.

In the following hours, the maid Florrie suffers from a terrible headache and asks Sarah for an aspirin. Shortly afterward, Sarah realizes Florrie is near death; her quick action saves the girl's life, since the doctor would not have arrived in time. Strangely, the aspirin tablets had been replaced with Veronal, and Florrie, unaware, had taken too much. Sarah wants to leave, but they beg her to stay and continue nursing Florrie.

By now, Sarah has noticed many clues. She intercepts a letter and realizes she is being watched — and the box of pills has disappeared. Dave has apparently vanished as well, and the family suspects him of killing Bayard: he had old grudges against him, though no more than his brother Hilary did. Yet Dave is soon found dead in his study (which is soundproofed), the cause being an overdose of Veronal.

The family, though protected by the authorities, must now face the question of who — and what — caused these two deaths. Adela, the unquestioned matriarch, leads an internal investigation in Sarah’s presence, determined to secure her silence. It emerges that Bayard had been blackmailing Hilary; that Janice (Dave's wife) was in love — and loved in return — by Allen, brother of her sister-in-law Evelyn; that Dave was addicted to Veronal, allowing Bayard to keep him under control; and that the drug was hidden in the tomb of an ancestor at the cemetery. Florrie was poisoned by accident, while Dave, in despair, swallowed all the remaining tablets — though not with a deliberate intent to die.

In the end, Sarah, seeing that everyone has suffered greatly and been punished by their own circumstances, agrees to let the matter rest. Her discretion is rewarded by a letter from Adela, in which the woman confesses that she herself killed Bayard, who, though raised alongside Hilary and Dave, had behaved like a cuckoo, destroying the nest that had sheltered him.

== Film adaptation ==
In 1936 the book was adapted into a film of the same title, produced by Hollywood studio Warner Brothers and directed by Frank McDonald. The cast featured Lyle Talbot, Marguerite Churchill and Claire Dodd.

== Bibliography ==
- Goble, Alan. The Complete Index to Literary Sources in Film. Walter de Gruyter, 1999.
