= Peter Milne (screenwriter) =

American screenwriter

Peter Milne (August 15, 1896 – March 29, 1968) was an American screenwriter, who wrote for more than 50 films. Prior to this, he wrote reviews for the Motion Picture News, and was the author of Motion Picture Directing: The Facts and Theories of the Newest Art (1922).

== Selected filmography ==
- Little Italy (1921)
- Queen of the Moulin Rouge (1922)
- What Fools Men Are (1922)
- When the Desert Calls (1922)
- Headlines (1925)
- The College Widow (1927)
- Home Struck (1927)
- The Michigan Kid (1928)
- Name the Woman (1928)
- The Head of the Family (1928)
- Modern Mothers (1928)
- Object: Alimony (1928)
- The Kennel Murder Case (1933)
- From Headquarters (1933)
- Registered Nurse (1934)
- Gold Diggers of 1935 (1935)
- The Woman in Red (1935)
- Mr. Moto in Danger Island (1939)
- The House of Fear (1939)
- They Meet Again (1941)
- Step Lively (1944)
- God Is My Co-Pilot (1945)
- The Verdict (1946)
- My Wild Irish Rose (1947)
- The Daughter of Rosie O'Grady (1950)
- Painting the Clouds with Sunshine (1951)
- She's Working Her Way Through College (1952)
