= Rubie Saunders =

American novelist

- Born: January 31, 1929; New York City, U.S.
- Died: December 20, 2001, aged 72
- Education: Hunter College
- Occupations: Writer editor

Rubie A. Saunders (January 31, 1929 – December 20, 2001) was an American editor and author. She served as editor for Calling All Girls magazine (later Young Miss) from 1963 to 1979. Saunders wrote several non-fiction books, as well as four romance novels featuring the character Marilyn Morgan, R.N.

== Biography ==
Rubie Saunders was born January 31, 1929, in New York City. She graduated from Hunter College with a BA in journalism in 1950. After graduation, she joined Parents' Magazine Enterprises as an editorial assistant, rising through the ranks until she became managing editor of Calling All Girls magazine. In 1963 she became editor of the magazine, which in 1966 became Young Miss. Saunders remained editor until 1979.

Saunders continued to write as a freelancer while serving as editor of Young Miss, producing books for teenagers on matters including grooming, childcare, and party planning.

In 1969 she published her first fictional work, Marilyn Morgan, R.N. for New American Library's Signet Nurse Romances line. While the book was similar in many ways to other nurse-doctor romances of the time, it was one of the first to be written by a Black author and feature Black characters. Eventually, Saunders published three more romances featuring Marilyn Morgan as the main character- Nurse Morgan's Triumph (1970), Marilyn Morgan, Cruise Nurse (1971), and Nurse Morgan Sees It Through (1971).

In the late 1980s, Saunders became a member of the New Rochelle, New York, School Board, eventually rising to the role of president. The New Rochelle Fund for Educational Excellence holds an annual Rubie Saunders Fall Literary Festival in her memory.

Saunders died on December 20, 2001.

== Bibliography ==
=== Non-fiction ===
- The Calling All Girls Party Book (1966)
- Baby-Sitting: A Concise Guide (1972)
- Good Grooming for Boys (1972)
- Smart Shopping and Consumerism (1973)
- Good Grooming for Girls (1976)
- Quick and Easy Housekeeping (1977)
- The Beauty Book (1983)

=== Fiction ===
- Marilyn Morgan, R.N. (1969)
- Nurse Morgan's Triumph (1970)
- Marilyn Morgan, Cruise Nurse (1971)
- Nurse Morgan Sees It Through (1971)
