= While the Patient Slept (novel) =

1930 novel by Mignon Good Eberhart

First edition (publ. Doubleday Doran)

While the Patient Slept is a 1930 mystery novel by Mignon G. Eberhart. It was both Eberhart's second novel, and the second of the author's seven novels revolving around the central character of Sarah Keate. The novel received positive reviews upon its release. A film adaptation of the same name was released by First National Pictures in 1935.

== Plot ==
The gothic, closed community, murder mystery involves a nurse who is assigned to the at-home care of a man who recently had a stroke. While he is unconscious, on a dark and stormy night, a murder takes place in his bedroom. With family members and potential heirs confined to the house for several days, additional murders occur while the nurse and a police detective, a friend of hers from a past case, work on solving the case.

== Themes ==
This novel was the second of the seven Eberhart books featuring nurse Sarah Keate as an amateur detective. Regarding other characters, historian Rick Cypert cites effete antagonist Eustace Federie as the first of thirty-six such instances of queer-coded villain characters in Eberhart's novels.

== Publication history ==
The novel was first published in the United States by Doubleday, Doran & Company and in England by William Heinemann. It was most recently available in paperback through the University of Nebraska Press in a 1995 edition that features an introduction by Jay Fultz.
