= The White Cockatoo =

1935 American mystery film directed by Alan Crosland

- Directed by: Alan Crosland
- Written by: Ben Markson; Lillie Hayward
- Based on: The White Cockatoo; 1933 novel by Mignon G. Eberhart
- Produced by: Henry Blanke
- Starring: Jean Muir; Ricardo Cortez; Ruth Donnelly
- Cinematography: Tony Gaudio
- Edited by: Clarence Kolster
- Music by: Bernhard Kaun
- Production company: Warner Bros. Pictures
- Distributed by: Warner Bros. Pictures
- Release date: January 12, 1935
- Running time: 73 minutes
- Country: United States
- Language: English

The White Cockatoo is a 1935 American mystery film directed by Alan Crosland and starring Jean Muir, Ricardo Cortez and Ruth Donnelly. It was based on the 1933 novel of the same name by Mignon G. Eberhart. A print is preserved in the Library of Congress collection.

== Plot ==
In a secluded French hotel, a large inheritance is the motivation for threats and kidnappings.

== Cast ==
- Jean Muir as Sue Talley
- Ricardo Cortez as Jim Sundean
- Ruth Donnelly as Mrs. Byng
- Minna Gombell as Grete Lovscheim
- Walter Kingsford as Marcus Lovscheim
- John Eldredge as Francis Talley
- Gordon Westcott as Dr. Roberts
- Addison Richards as David Lorn
- Pauline Garon as Marianne
- Arnaud de Bordes as Marcel
- Ben Hewlett as Michael Stravsky
- André Cheron as Commissaire of Police
- Georges Renavent as Pierre
- Noel Francis as Elise
- Paul Panzer as The Chef

== Bibliography ==
- Monaco, James. The Encyclopedia of Film. Perigee Books, 1991.
