= Sarah Keate =

- First appearance: The Patient in Room 18
- Last appearance: Man Missing
- Created by: Mignon G. Eberhart
- Portrayed by: Aline MacMahon; Marguerite Churchill; Jane Darwell; Ann Sheridan

In-universe information
- Gender: Female
- Occupation: Nurse
- Nationality: American

Sarah Keate is a fictional character, the protagonist in a series of medical mystery novels by American author Mignon G. Eberhart.

== Overview ==
Keate, a nurse with a talent for solving crimes, was introduced in Eberhart's debut novel, The Patient in Room 18 (1929), and later appeared in While the Patient Slept (1930); The Mystery of Hunting's End (1930); From This Dark Stairway (1931); Murder by an Aristocrat (1932) (also published in 1934 as Murder of my Patient); Wolf in Man's Clothing (1942); and Man Missing (1954), as well as in several short stories. Five of the seven novels and one of the stories were turned into movies in the 1930s.

Eberhart was one of the most popular American mystery writers, producing 59 books between 1929 and 1988. Sarah Keate was one of her most famous characters. In fact, Keate proved to be Eberhart's only series sleuth, as the prolific author switched in the mid-1930s to writing mostly standalone novels, with no recurring characters. After that, she brought back Keate only rarely. Eberhart, however, continued to use medical settings and characters in the medical profession in her fiction.

Sarah Keate is a single nurse, middle-aged or perhaps younger, who sometimes works in hospitals and sometimes in the homes of patients. In some of the stories, she works with detective Lance O'Leary. As an amateur sleuth, Keate gets involved in situations that are "closed community" mysteries, with a finite number of potential suspects. Author Ron Backer has observed that "wherever she is employed, murders seem to occur ... she is a shrewd observer of the suspects and the evidence".

== Reception of the books ==
In a review of Eberhart's first novel, The Patient in Room 18, Solomon Posen noted: "Eberhart's Sarah Keate RN spends a good deal of her time assisting detective O'Leary in solving a hospital murder mystery. However, in between discovering interesting objects, attending inquests and pursuing suspects, Miss Keate carries out the duties of a nursing supervisor efficiently and without complaints. She is totally free of the blemishes displayed by most fictional nurses". The second Nurse Keate novel won a $5000 Scotland Yard Prize, from the Crime Club booksellers association.

== List of novels ==
- The Patient in Room 18 (1929)
- While the Patient Slept (1930)
- The Mystery of Hunting's End (1930)
- From This Dark Stairway (1931)
- Murder by an Aristocrat (1932) aka Murder of My Patient
- Wolf in Man's Clothing (1942)
- Man Missing (1954)

== Film adaptations ==
Sarah Keate (with variations in her name) was portrayed in films by Aline MacMahon, Jane Darwell, Marguerite Churchill, and Ann Sheridan:

- While the Patient Slept, filmed in 1935
- Murder by an Aristocrat (based on Murder of My Patient), filmed in 1936
- The Great Hospital Mystery, filmed in 1937
- The Patient in Room 18, filmed in 1938
- Mystery House (based on The Mystery of Hunting's End), filmed in 1938
- The Dark Stairway (based on From What Dark Stairway), filmed in 1938

=== Reception ===
In discussing the shared characteristics of nurses as depicted in film, critic Julia Hallam noted that Sarah Keate was one of the "popular nurse sleuths who worked as private duty nurses for wealthy patients in their own homes and became embroiled in the mysterious goings-on of the mansions' other occupants. The nurses in these films display wit, mental acuity and courage; they are worldly wise, not easily taken in by outward appearances, yet are portrayed as sympathetic and kindly women ... By focusing on nurses as sleuths ... nurses are depicted as intelligent, rational women with logical powers of deduction". But the films were not as well received as the books, partly because they were considered sloppily written broad comedies rather than suspenseful mysteries. There was no consistency in these films even when it came to the character's name, which was presented in various productions as Sally Keating, Miss Keats, and Sara (without an h) Keate.
