= South of Panama (1928 film) =

1928 film by Charles Hunt

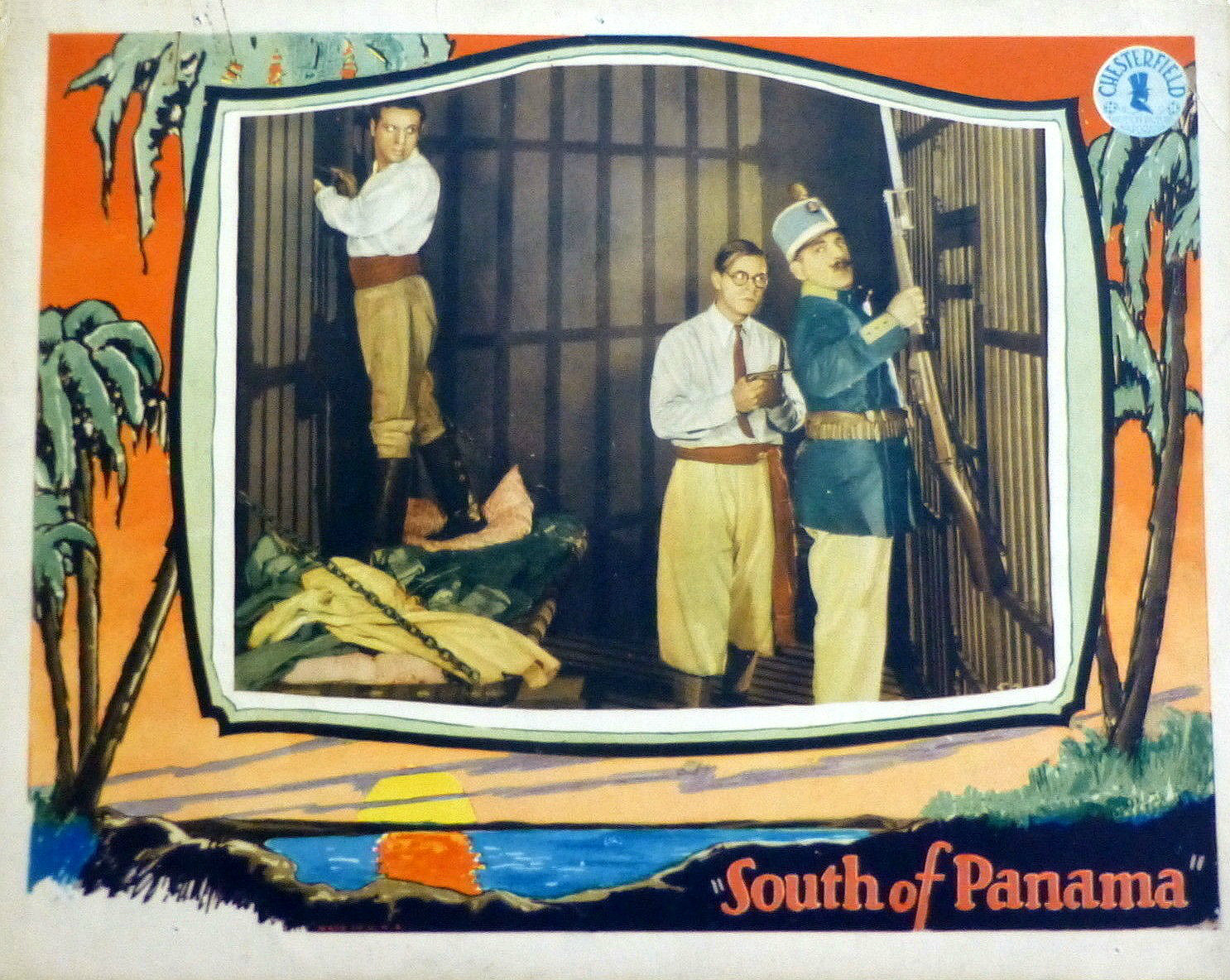
- Lobby card
- Directed by: Charles J. Hunt
- Written by: Arthur Hoerl; Charles J. Hunt; Lon Young
- Starring: Carmelita Geraghty; Edward Raquello; Lewis Sargent
- Cinematography: M.A. Anderson
- Edited by: Charles J. Hunt
- Music by: Alberto Colombo
- Production company: Chesterfield Pictures
- Distributed by: Chesterfield Pictures
- Release date: November 15, 1928
- Running time: 68 minutes
- Country: United States
- Language: Silent (English intertitles)

South of Panama (1928)

South of Panama is a 1928 American silent drama film directed by Charles J. Hunt and starring Carmelita Geraghty, Edward Raquello, and Lewis Sargent.

== Plot ==
A dim-witted American is caught up with arms dealers in South America.

== Cast ==
- Carmelita Geraghty as Carmelita Laredon
- Edward Raquello as Emilio Cervantes
- Lewis Sargent as Dick Lewis
- Philo McCullough as 'Ace' Carney
- Marie Messinger as Patsy
- Henry Arras as 'Red' Hearn
- Carlton S. King as Presidente Laredon
- Joseph Burke as Garcia
- Fred Walton as Captain of the Guard

== Bibliography ==
- Darby, William. Masters of Lens and Light: A Checklist of Major Cinematographers and Their Feature Films. Scarecrow Press, 1991
