= The Dark Garden =

1935 novel by Mignon G. Eberhart

First edition (publ. Doubleday Doran) Cover art by Walter Frame

The Dark Garden is a murder mystery novel written by Mignon G. Eberhart. It was published by Doubleday, Doran & Co. in 1935. It was rereleased as a mass market paperback at least twice, first in 1944 by Bestseller Mystery Books, and in 1966 by McFadden.

== Reception ==
The New York Times gave The Dark Garden a positive review: "Of all the excellent mystery stories that Mignon G. Eberhart has to her credit this one seems to us to be by far the best."

Rich Cypert's essay on queer coding in Eberhart's writings singles out the character of Clarence Siskinson as typical of the "harmless older gentlemen dandies" favored by the author.
