= The Murder of Dr. Harrigan =

1936 film by Frank McDonald

- Directed by: Frank McDonald
- Screenplay by: Peter Milne; Sy Bartlett
- Based on: From This Dark Stairway; 1931 novel by Mignon G. Eberhart
- Produced by: Bryan Foy
- Starring: Ricardo Cortez; Kay Linaker; John Eldredge; Mary Astor; Joseph Crehan; Frank Reicher
- Cinematography: Arthur L. Todd
- Edited by: William Clemens
- Music by: Bernhard Kaun
- Production company: First National Pictures
- Distributed by: Warner Bros. Pictures
- Release date: January 11, 1936
- Running time: 67 minutes
- Country: United States
- Language: English

The Murder of Dr. Harrigan is a 1936 American mystery film directed by Frank McDonald and written by Peter Milne and Sy Bartlett. The film stars Ricardo Cortez, Kay Linaker, John Eldredge, Mary Astor, Joseph Crehan and Frank Reicher. The film was released by Warner Bros. Pictures on January 11, 1936. A story by Mignon G. Eberhart was the basis for the film.

== Plot ==
The head of a drug company mysteriously disappeared after taking credit for a new anesthetic that actually resulted from the work of several doctors, and "the doctor who was to have operated on him is found mysteriously murdered by a surgical instrument."

== Cast ==
- Ricardo Cortez as George Lambert
- Kay Linaker as Sally Keating
- John Eldredge as Dr. Harrigan
- Mary Astor as Lillian Cooper
- Joseph Crehan as Lieut. Lamb
- Frank Reicher as Dr. Coate
- Anita Kerry as Agnes Melady
- Phillip Reed as Dr. Simon
- Robert Strange as Peter Melady
- Mary Treen as Nurse Margaret Brody
- Wild Bill Elliott as Kenneth Martin
- Don Barclay as Jackson
- Johnny Arthur as Mr. Wentworth
- Joan Blair as Ina Harrigan

== Critical reception ==
Frank S. Nugent of The New York Times gave a negative review. He commented that there was a lot of activity within the film that failed to contribute to the resolution of the case, and wrote, "It reached some sort of conclusion on the screen, but it is an unsolved mystery so far as we are concerned."

Variety described the film as "A murder mystery that’s too routine to inspire more than casual audience interest. It’s along formula lines from the threat of murder, down to the solution of the murder, plus another death. No names in the cast for marquee attention and doubtful if results will be any better than lukewarm." The reviewer was dismissive of the majority of the performances, with the exceptions of Kay Linaker who "gives a good performance", and Mary Astor who "proves an agreeable cast selection."
