= Aline MacMahon =

American actress (1899–1991)

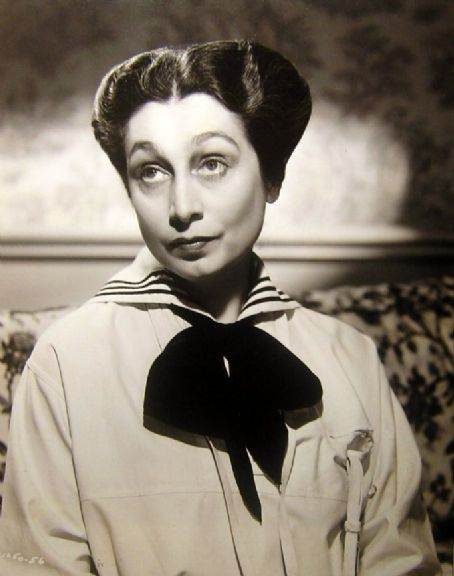
- MacMahon in the 1940s
- Born: Aline Laveen MacMahon; May 3, 1899; McKeesport, Pennsylvania, U.S.
- Died: October 12, 1991 (aged 92); New York City, U.S.
- Education: Barnard College
- Occupation: Actress
- Years active: 1920–1975
- Spouse: Clarence Stein (m. 1928; died 1975)

Aline Laveen MacMahon (May 3, 1899 – October 12, 1991) was an American actress. Her Broadway stage career began with a small role in Edgar Selwyn's The Mirage in 1920. She made her screen debut in 1931 and worked extensively in film, theater, and television until her retirement in 1975. She was nominated for an Academy Award for Best Supporting Actress for her performance in Dragon Seed (1944).

== Early life ==
MacMahon was born in McKeesport, Pennsylvania, the only child of William Marcus MacMahon and Jennie (née Simon) MacMahon. Her father was a telegraph operator, arbitrage broker, and writer/editor in the Munsey publishing company, including their flagship publication, Munsey's Magazine. Her father had Scottish and Irish ancestry, while her mother had Russian-Jewish ancestry.

Aline's parents had married on July 14, 1898, in Columbus, Ohio. Her father died on September 6, 1931. Her mother, an avid bell collector, died in 1984 at the age of 106.

MacMahon appeared on stage as early as 1905. That year the family moved to Brooklyn from McKeesport, and Aline's mother began training her in the art of elocution. Soon Aline was performing at local churches and festivals where she recited poems and played the violin. By 1908 she was well known enough to attract the attention of The Brooklyn Daily Eagle, which reported "a series of songs and dances by Aline MacMahon" to be performed at St. Jude's Church in Brooklyn.

Although she had been earning handsome wages for many years on New York's so-called Strawberry Circuit, MacMahon made her true professional debut in 1914 with a program of readings, recitations, and singing at New York's McAlpin Hotel.

== Education ==
MacMahon was raised first in the Pittsburgh suburb of McKeesport, then in Brooklyn, New York. She attended New York's public school 103 before entering Erasmus Hall High School (Brooklyn) in 1912. In 1916 the MacMahon family moved to the upper west side of Manhattan, and Aline enrolled in nearby Barnard College. It was there that MacMahon received a more serious education in acting, enrolling in "Wigs and Cues", the theater program run by the woman who became MacMahon's first great mentor, Minor Latham. By graduation she had appeared in nearly every program the school had mounted during those four years, and she found multiple suitors for her talents, including offers from the Provincetown Players, producer / actor Walter Hampden, and the Neighborhood Playhouse.

== Career ==
MacMahon made her (uncredited) Broadway debut in 1920 as a craps-playing debutante in Edgar Selwyn's drama, The Mirage. Her Broadway credits would eventually include over 30 shows, with many other off-Broadway and regional stage appearances during her career. Among her more memorable stage appearances were in Beyond the Horizon (1926), The Eve of Saint Mark (1942), The Confidential Clerk (1954), Pictures in the Hallway (1956), and All the Way Home (1960).

MacMahon traveled to Los Angeles to star in the road company of the Broadway smash Once in a Lifetime (1930). While there, she was noticed by Warner Bros. director Mervyn LeRoy and made her film debut in the Pre-Code drama Five Star Final (1931). After signing a long-term contract with Warner, she spent the rest of her career splitting time between Hollywood and New York in order to be with her husband, the Manhattan-based architect and city planner, Clarence Stein.

In the 1930s and 1940s, MacMahon was a film critic's darling (Walter Winchell called her "the very good actress"), often cast as the acerbic comedienne with a heart of gold or the long-suffering woman unlucky in love. Her biggest professional regret was not getting the starring role of O-Lan in The Good Earth (1937); the part went to Luise Rainer and won her an Academy Award. According to Screen World Presents the Encyclopedia of Hollywood Film Actors, MacMahon in her later film acting career "moved into character roles with ease as she became plumper and more motherly looking."

In 1950 she served as chairwoman of the Equity Library Theater. She organized productions for community theaters and was active in relief charities.

== Personal life ==
On March 28, 1928, MacMahon and Clarence Stein were married after a long courtship. The pair were devoted to each other, but commuting between coasts was a strain on their marriage. As Clarence's health failed in the late 1960s and early '70s, Aline confined herself to working in New York City theatrical productions close to their apartment.

== Method acting ==
In 1922, MacMahon was a member of the Neighborhood Playhouse company in Manhattan, just as Konstantin Stanislavski's Moscow Art Theatre visited New York for a legendary tour. Accolades poured in for the MAT's performances, and the executives of the Neighborhood Playhouse made arrangements to charter the first teaching class of the Method in America, which MacMahon attended with nine others. She took the tenets of the Method very seriously and was the only member of that inaugural class to achieve popular success, having debuted the technique on stage in the fall of 1923 and as the first practitioner of it on film in 1931. "I was the first," she said in 1959, "in the first group to be exposed to what has become the Method. Out of that summer [1923] has developed everything that the Method actors are doing." She was a pioneering Method actor in the Western world.

== Blacklisted ==
During the 1950s MacMahon was blacklisted as a Communist sympathizer. Her name appeared in the notorious Communist watchlist pamphlet Red Channels. For years, the FBI had been surveilling her and her husband, including the couple's frequent international travel (for example, they sailed around the world in 1935–1936). Red Channels targeted her for being a council member of Actors' Equity, the theatrical labor union. She had also supported the 1948 presidential campaign of Progressive Party candidate Henry Wallace, and she was honorary vice-president of the League of Women Shoppers, a consumer advocacy group described as "Communist-inspired and therefore Communist-dominated and controlled", with the intent "to create mass feminine support in labor disputes." Because MacMahon was never called before the House Un-American Activities Committee (HUAC), she was more on the "graylist" than blacklist. However, it still brought her film acting career to an end. From 1955 to 1960, she could only get jobs in B-movies, and by the time the blacklist eased in the 1960s, there was no movie work for her.

== Death ==
On October 12, 1991, Aline MacMahon died of pneumonia in New York City. She was 92.

== Legacy ==
The New York Public Library has a collection of MacMahon's papers that document various aspects of her life. They are housed in the library's Billy Rose Theatre Division.

The first full-length biography of her, Aline MacMahon: Hollywood, the Blacklist, and the Birth of Method Acting, was published in 2022 by University Press of Kentucky.

== Partial filmography ==
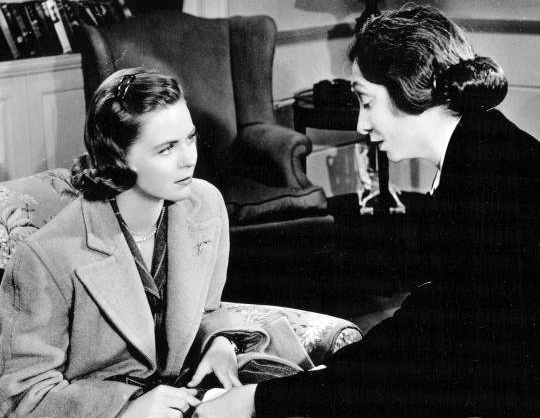
Dorothy McGuire (left) and Aline MacMahon in Reward Unlimited (1944)

- Five Star Final (1931) – Miss Taylor
- The Heart of New York (1932) – Bessie, the Neighbor
- The Mouthpiece (1932) – Miss Hickey, Day's Secretary
- Week-End Marriage (1932) – Agnes Davis
- Life Begins (1932) – Miss Bowers
- Once in a Lifetime (1932) – May Daniels
- One Way Passage (1932) – Betty
- Silver Dollar (1932) – Sarah Martin
- Gold Diggers of 1933 (1933) – Trixie Lorraine
- The Life of Jimmy Dolan (1933) – Mrs. Moore aka Auntie
- Heroes for Sale (1933) – Mary
- The World Changes (1933) – Anna Nordholm
- Heat Lightning (1934) – Olga (first leading role)
- The Merry Frinks (1934) – Hattie 'Mom' Frink
- Side Streets (1934) – Bertha Krasnoff
- Big Hearted Herbert (1934) – Elizabeth
- Babbitt (1934) – Myra Babbitt
- While the Patient Slept (1935) – Sarah Keate
- Mary Jane's Pa (1935) – Ellen Preston
- I Live My Life (1935) – Betty Collins
- Kind Lady (1935) – Mary Herries
- Ah, Wilderness! (1935) – Aunt Lily
- When You're in Love (1937) – Marianne Woods
- Back Door to Heaven (1939) – Miss Williams
- Out of the Fog (1941) – Florence Goodwin
- The Lady is Willing (1942) – Buddy
- Tish (1942) – Lizzie Wilkins
- Stage Door Canteen (1943) – Aline MacMahon
- Seeds of Freedom (1943) – Odessa Citizen
- Reward Unlimited (1944, short) – Mrs. Scott
- Dragon Seed (1944) – Ling Tan's Wife
- Guest in the House (1944) – Aunt Martha
- The Mighty McGurk (1947) – Mamie Steeple
- The Search (1948) – Mrs. Deborah R. Murray
- Roseanna McCoy (1949) – Sarie McCoy
- The Flame and the Arrow (1950) – Nonna Bartoli
- The Eddie Cantor Story (1953) – Grandma Esther
- The Man from Laramie (1955) – Kate Canaday
- Cimarron (1960) – Mrs. Mavis Pegler
- The Young Doctors (1961) – Dr. Lucy Grainger
- Diamond Head (1963) – Kapiolani Kahana
- I Could Go On Singing (1963) – Ida
- All the Way Home (1963) – Aunt Hannah
- For the Use of the Hall (1975, TV) - Bess

== Census and other data ==
- The 1910 United States Federal Census for Brooklyn, New York, April 16, 1910, Enumeration District 1409, Sheet 5.
- The 1920 United States Federal Census for Manhattan Assembly District 13, January 25, 1920, Enumeration District 943, Sheet 9A.
- U.S. Passport Applications 1795–1925, Roll 1533-6376-6749, March 19–21, 1921 (Ancestry.com)
