= With This Ring (novel) =

British Mystery Novel

First edition image

With This Ring is a mystery novel by Mignon G. Eberhart published by Random House in 1941 and issued in the UK by Collins Crime Club that same year.

== Reception ==
With This Ring was given a glowing review by Isaac Anderson in the New York Times. Anderson wrote: "One hesitates to say that this is the best of Mrs. Eberhart's books, for she has a long list of good mystery stories to her credit, but it is certainly not far from the best."
