= The Great Hospital Mystery =

1937 film by James Tinling

- Theatrical release poster
- Directed by: James Tinling
- Screenplay by: Bess Meredyth; William M. Conselman; Jerome Cady
- Story by: Mignon G. Eberhart
- Produced by: John Stone
- Starring: Jane Darwell; Sig Ruman; Sally Blane; Thomas Beck; Joan Davis; William Demarest
- Cinematography: Harry Jackson
- Edited by: Nick DeMaggio
- Production company: 20th Century Fox
- Distributed by: 20th Century Fox
- Release date: May 14, 1937
- Running time: 58 minutes
- Country: United States
- Language: English

The Great Hospital Mystery is a 1937 American crime film directed by James Tinling and written by Bess Meredyth, William M. Conselman and Jerome Cady. The film stars Jane Darwell, Sig Ruman, Sally Blane, Thomas Beck, Joan Davis and William Demarest. It was released on May 14, 1937, by 20th Century Fox.

This is one of six mystery movies based on Mignon G. Eberhart's stories about nurse-sleuth Sarah Keate, but the character's name was altered slightly in some of these films. In this one, she is called Sarah Keats.

== Cast ==
- Jane Darwell as Miss Sarah Keats
- Sig Ruman as Dr. Taggert
- Sally Blane as Ann Smith
- Thomas Beck as Dr. David McKerry
- Joan Davis as Flossie Duff
- William Demarest as Mr. Beatty
- George Walcott as Allen Tracy
- Wade Boteler as Det. Lt. Mattoon
- Howard Phillips as Tom Kirby
