= Dark Garden, Estonia =

Park in Narva, Estonia

Coordinates: 59°22′52″N 28°12′15″E

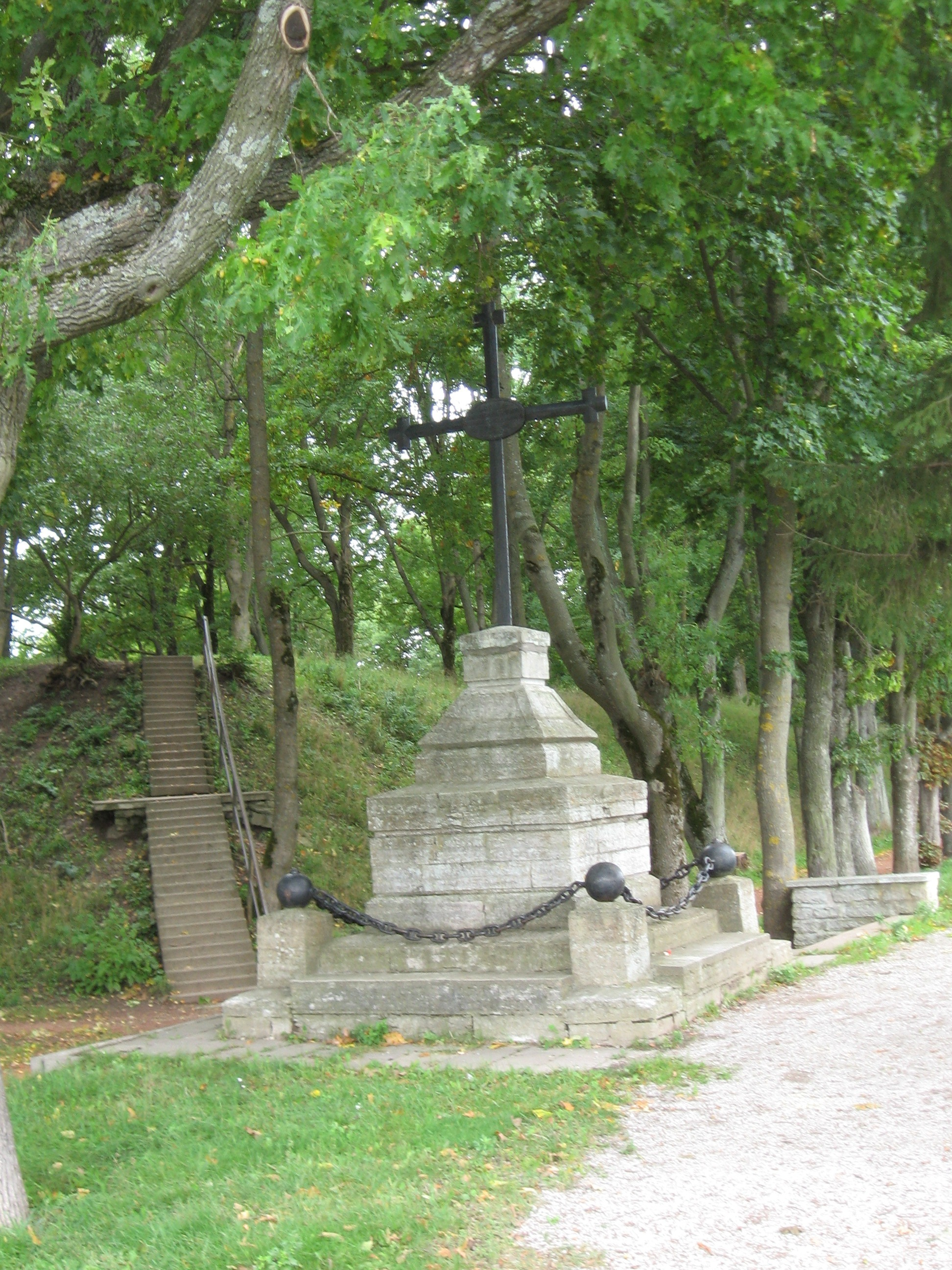
Iron cross for Russian soldiers

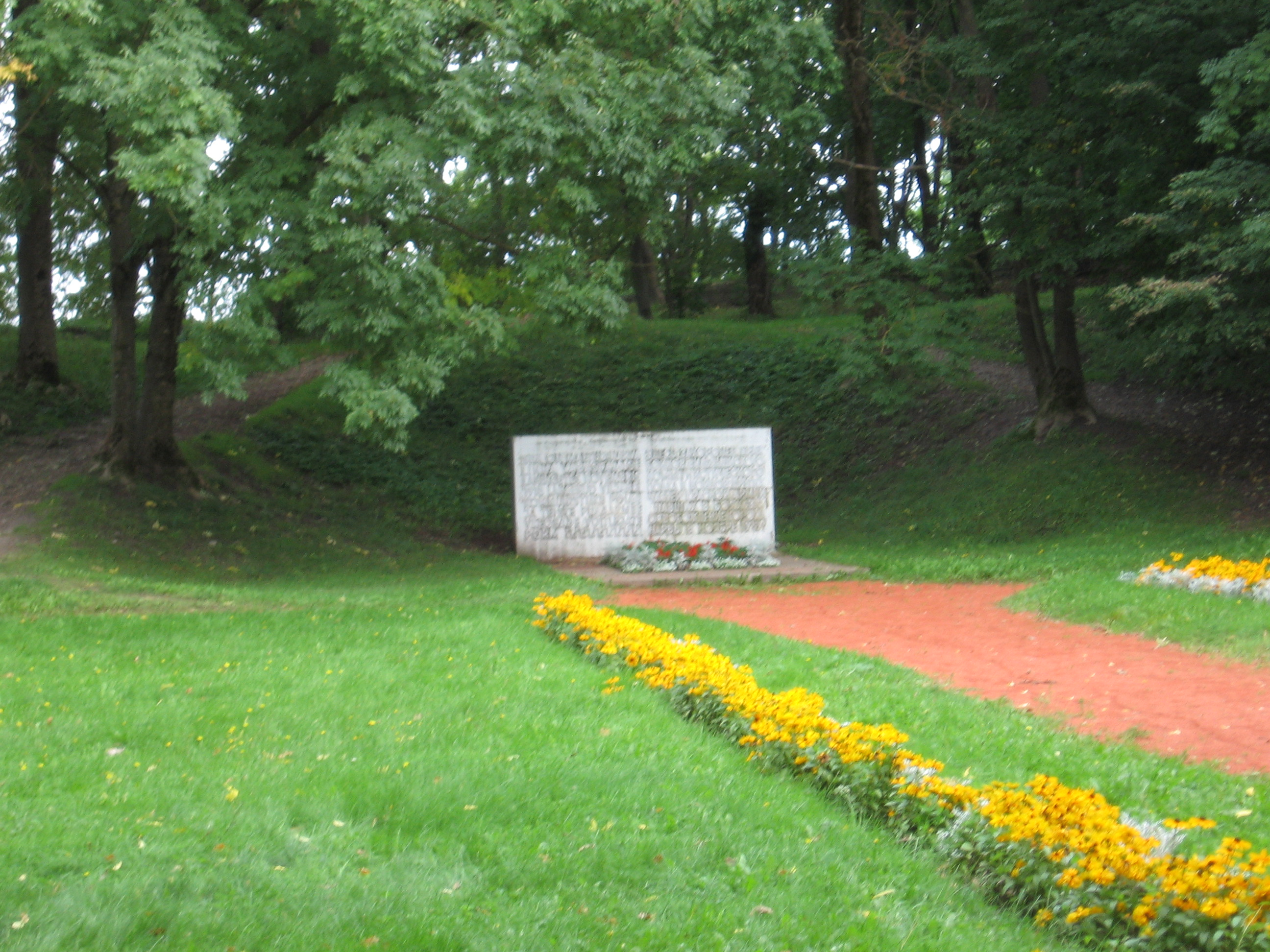
Monument for the victims who died in the Estonian War of Independence

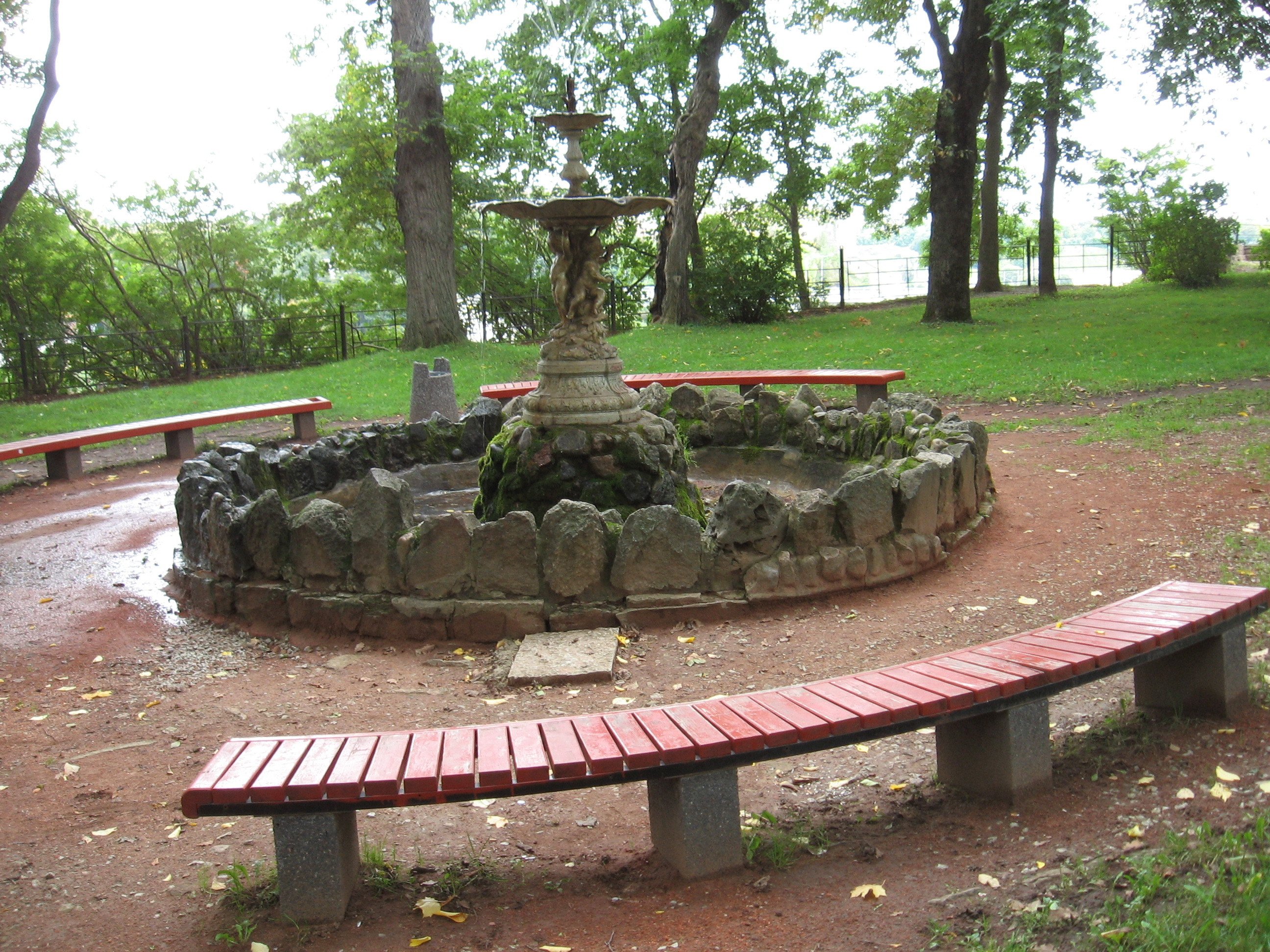
Fountain

Dark Garden (Estonian: Pimeaed) is a park in Narva, Estonia.

The park is Narva's oldest park. The park was found at the end of the 19th century.

In the park, there are two notable monuments: the iron cross for Russian soldiers who died during the Siege of Narva in the Great Northern War, and the second monument is for the victims who died in the Estonian War of Independence in November 1918.
