= The Unknown Quantity (novel) =

1953 mystery novel by Mignon G. Eberhart

First edition

The Unknown Quantity is a mystery novel by Mignon G. Eberhart published by Random House in 1953 and was issued in the UK by Collins Crime Club that same year. It was reprinted in 1990 by Warner Books.
