= Murder by an Aristocrat =

1936 film by Frank McDonald

- Lobby card
- Directed by: Frank McDonald
- Screenplay by: Luci Ward; Roy Chanslor
- Based on: Murder by an Aristocrat; 1932 novel by Mignon G. Eberhart
- Produced by: Bryan Foy; Hal B. Wallis
- Starring: Lyle Talbot; Marguerite Churchill; Claire Dodd
- Cinematography: Arthur L. Todd
- Edited by: Louis Hesse
- Production company: Warner Bros. Pictures
- Distributed by: Warner Bros. Pictures
- Release date: June 13, 1936
- Running time: 60 minutes
- Country: United States
- Language: English

Murder by an Aristocrat is a 1936 American mystery film directed by Frank McDonald and starring Lyle Talbot, Marguerite Churchill and Claire Dodd. The film was based on a 1932 novel of the same title by Mignon G. Eberhart, with sets designed by Hugh Reticker. It was the seventh of 12 B-mysteries released by Warner Bros. Pictures as part of their "Clue Club" series between 1935 and 1938.

== Plot ==
Bayard Thatcher, the black sheep of a storied family, has announced that he will leave for good provided the others pay him $25,000. However, they are not that liquid at the moment, due to lingering effects of the Great Depression. That night, Thatcher is shot in his bed but only wounded. As he recovers, his doctor and nurse try to discern his assailant's identity while also protecting him from any attempts to finish the job.

== Cast ==
- Lyle Talbot as Dr. Allen Carick
- Marguerite Churchill as Nurse Sally Keating
- Claire Dodd as Janice Thatcher
- John Eldredge as John Tweed
- Wild Bill Elliott as Dave Thatcher
- Virginia Brissac as Adela Thatcher
- William B. Davidson as Bayard Thatcher
- Joseph Crehan as Hilary Thatcher
- Florence Fair as Evelyn Thatcher
- Stuart Holmes as Higby - Butler
- Lottie Williams as Emeline
- Mary Treen as Florrie
- Milton Kibbee as Cab Driver

== Bibliography ==
- Backer, Ron. Mystery Movie Series of 1930s Hollywood. McFarland, 2012.
