= Hugh Reticker =

American art director (1884–1969)

- Born: November 19, 1884; Rock Island, Illinois, U.S.
- Died: December 3, 1969 (aged 85); Santa Barbara County, California, U.S.
- Occupation: Art director
- Years active: 1935–1950 (film)

Hugh Reticker (November 19, 1884 – December 3, 1969) was an American art director associated with the Hollywood studio Warner Brothers. He worked on more than seventy films during his career.

== Selected filmography ==
- The Widow from Monte Carlo (1935)
- Murder by an Aristocrat (1936)
- She Loved a Fireman (1937)
- Sergeant Murphy (1938)
- You Can't Get Away with Murder (1939)
- Gambling on the High Seas (1940)
- The Great Mr. Nobody (1941)
- Across the Pacific (1942)

== Bibliography ==
- McGrath, Patrick J. (January 1, 1993). John Garfield: The Illustrated Career in Films and on Stage. United Kingdom: McFarland. ISBN 9780899508672.
