= Mignon G. Eberhart =

American mystery writer (1899–1996)

Mignon Good Eberhart (July 6, 1899 – October 8, 1996) was an American author of mystery novels. She had one of the longest careers (from the 1920s to the 1980s) among major American mystery writers.

== Early life ==
Eberhart was born Mignonette Good on July 6, 1899, in Lincoln, Nebraska. As a teenager, Good often wrote short stories and novels to occupy herself. From 1917 to 1920, she attended Nebraska Wesleyan University but did not complete the coursework for a degree. In 1923, she married Alanson Clyde Eberhart, cousin of the poet Richard Eberhart, and began writing short stories to combat boredom. Within several years, she had begun writing novels. In 1929, she published her first novel, The Patient in Room 18, which introduced her series character Nurse Sarah Keate and her boyfriend Detective Lance O'Leary. A second novel, While the Patient Slept, also featuring Keate, received the $5000 Scotland Yard Prize in 1931. Four years later, Eberhart's alma mater presented her with an honorary doctorate.

== Career ==
By the end of the 1930s, Eberhart had become the leading female crime novelist in the United States and was one of the highest-paid female crime novelists in the world, next to Agatha Christie. She was one of the first of many writers called, by their publishers, "America's Agatha Christie," few of which had as little in common with 'Dame Agatha in matters of plotting, characterization, or even type of story.' She wrote a total of 59 novels, the last published in 1988, shortly before her 89th birthday. Eight of her novels were adapted as movies, beginning in 1935 with While the Patient Slept. The last adaptation, based on the book Hasty Wedding, was the movie Three's a Crowd, released in 1945. She also collaborated with Robert Wallsten to adapt her novel Fair Warning into the play, Eight O'Clock Tuesday, which played first at the Cleveland Playhouse in Ohio in 1939–40, and then on Broadway in 1941, starring Celeste Holm.

Sarah Keate, though popular as the protagonist of Eberhart's first five novels, proved to be the author's only series sleuth, making only a couple of appearances after the early 1930s. Instead, Eberhart wrote mostly "standalone" mysteries, something fairly unusual for a crime writer with such a large output.

Eberhart was one of the more prolific of the practitioners of the classic romantic suspense novel that had begun with some of the earliest work of Anna Katharine Green and was brought to its height by Mary Roberts Rinehart in the early 20th century. There had been many female sleuths featured in short stories previously, and Rinehart had introduced her own nurse-detective, Hilda Adams, aka "Miss Pinkerton," in the second decade of the 20th century. But in 1929, when Eberhart introduced Sarah Keate, it was still relatively rare to have a female lead in novel-length "straight detective stories". The year after Eberhart's first novel was published, Agatha Christie wrote the first novel featuring her female detective, Jane Marple, who had previously appeared in short stories collected as "The Tuesday Club Murders".

In 2007, a posthumous collection of her short stories, Dead Yesterday and Other Stories, was edited by Rick Cypert and Kirby McCauley and published by Crippen & Landru.

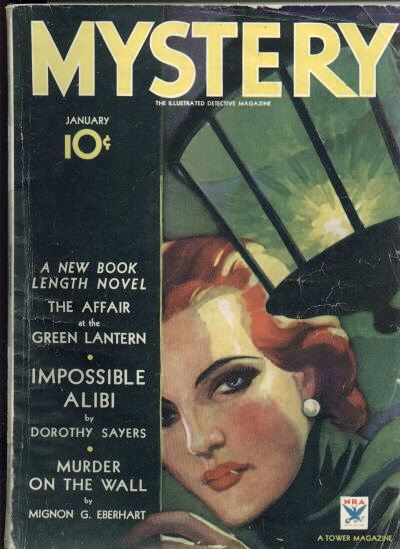
Cover of the pulp magazine Mystery (January 1934) This issue featured the story "Murder on the Wall" by Mignon G. Eberhart. [Public domain].

== Style and reception ==
Eberhart's works often featured female protagonists, and tended to include exotic locations, wealthy characters, and suspense and romance. Her characterization has been praised, her characters described as always having "genuine and believable motives for everything they do." Her "writing is spare but almost lyrical."

In 1971, she was awarded the Mystery Writers of America's Grand Master Award. Eberhart also served as president of the Mystery Writers of America. In 1994, she received the Agatha Award: Malice Domestic Award for Lifetime Achievement.

== Personal life ==
The normally prolific Eberhart wrote relatively few books in the 1940s, possibly due to upheaval in her personal life. After 20 years of marriage, she divorced Alanson Eberhart, and in 1946 married John Hazen Perry. But within two years, she had divorced Perry and remarried Eberhart. The Eberharts remained married until his death in 1974.

Eberhart died Greenwich, Connecticut in 1996. She is buried in Long Island National Cemetery, a Veterans Administration burial site, beside husband Alanson, who had served as a Navy lieutenant commander in World War II.

== Novels ==
=== Sarah Keate series ===
- The Patient in Room 18 (1929) filmed in 1938
- While the Patient Slept (1930) filmed in 1935
- The Mystery of Hunting's End (1930) filmed in 1938
- From This Dark Stairway (1931) filmed in 1938
- Murder by an Aristocrat (1932) aka Murder of My Patient filmed in 1936
- Wolf in Man's Clothing (1942)
- Man Missing (1954)

=== Standalone novels ===
- The White Cockatoo (1933) filmed in 1935
- The Dark Garden (1933) aka Death in the Fog
- The House on the Roof (1935)
- Fair Warning (1936)
- Danger in the Dark (1937) aka Hand in Glove
- The Pattern (1937)
- The Glass Slipper (1938)
- Hasty Wedding (1938)
- The Chiffon Scarf (1939)
- Brief Return (1939)
- The Hangman's Whip (1940)
- Speak No Evil (1941)
- With This Ring (1941)
- Fourth Mystery Book (1942)
- The Man Next Door (1943)
- Unidentified Woman (1943)
- Escape the Night (1944)
- Wings of Fear (1945)
- Five Passengers from Lisbon (1946)
- The White Dress (1946)
- Another Woman's House (1947)
- House of Storm (1949)
- Hunt With the Hounds (1950)
- Never Look Back (1951)
- Dead Men's Plans (1952)
- The Unknown Quantity (1953)
- Postmark Murder (1955)
- Another Man's Murder (1957)
- Melora (1959) aka The Promise of Murder (1961, 1966)
- Jury of One (1960)
- The Cup, the Blade or the Gun (1961) aka The Crime at Honotassa
- Enemy in the House (1962)
- Run Scared (1963)
- Call After Midnight (1964)
- R.S.V.P. Murder (1965)
- Witness at Large (1966)
- Woman on the Roof (1967)
- Message from Hong Kong (1969)
- El Rancho Rio (1970)
- Two Little Rich Girls (1971)
- Murder in Waiting (1973)
- Danger Money (1974)
- Nine O'Clock Tide (1975)
- Family Fortune (1976)
- Bayou Road (1979)
- Casa Madrone (1980)
- Family Affair (1981)
- Next of Kin (1982)
- The Patient in Cabin C (1983)
- Alpine Condo Crossfire (1984)
- A Fighting Chance (1986)
- Three Days for Emeralds (1988)

=== Short stories ===
- The Cases of Susan Dare (anthology, 1934)
- Deadly is the Diamond (anthology, 1958)
- Dead Yesterday and Other Stories (anthology, 2007)

== Film adaptations ==
Year	Title	Notes
1935	The White Cockatoo	book author
1935	While the Patient Slept	book author
1936	The Murder of Dr. Harrigan	short story author
1936	Murder by an Aristocrat	book author
1937	The Great Hospital Mystery	short story author
1938	The Dark Stairway	book author (from the novel From This Dark Stairway)
1938	The Patient in Room 18	book author
1938	Mystery House	book author (from the novel The Mystery of Hunting's End)
1945	Three's a Crowd	book author (from the novel Hasty Wedding)
