= Wolf in Man's Clothing =

1942 mystery novel by Mignon G. Eberhart

First edition

Wolf in Man's Clothing is a mystery novel by Mignon G. Eberhart. It was published by Random House in 1942 and issued in the UK by Collins Crime Club the following year. It was reissued by Bison Books in 1996.

This sixth novel featuring nurse Sarah Keate is the only one in which only Sarah appears, and not Lt. Lance O'Leary. It's also one of the few which also was not made into a film. The sales of the book, however, were so strong that her editor Harry Maule urged her to write one more Sarah Keate story.

== Plot summary ==
Set during World War II, nurse Sarah Keate and nurse Drue Cable investigate the suspicious shooting of Drue's millionaire ex-husband. While he is being treated and lying unconscious, someone in his family household, a gloomy mansion in the remote countryside is suspected of plotting to kill him.

== Reception ==
Isaac Anderson of the New York Times gave the novel a positive review, saying that "the story is so absorbing that one can easily forgive Mrs. Eberhart for her curiously involved manner of telling it, a manner which makes for slow reading". Despite a slow start, Anderson felt that the last act of the film moved rapidly and that the rapidly and that the romantic elements "served to increase and accentuate the suspense" rather than detracting from the plot.
