= The Patient in Room 18 =

1929 mystery novel by Mignon G. Eberhart

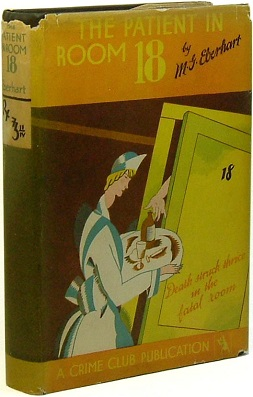
First edition (publ. Doubleday Doran). The door reads "Death struck thrice in the fatal room".

The Patient in Room 18 is a 1929 mystery novel written by Mignon G. Eberhart. Eberhart's first published novel, it follows the adventures of Nurse Sarah Keate, who would later appear in six more of Eberhart's works, and became one of the most popular mystery characters of the time. The novel later served as the basis for a 1938 motion picture released by Warner Brothers, with the same title, starring Patric Knowles and Ann Sheridan.
