= Beverly Roberts =

American actress (1914–2009)

- Beverly Roberts, at age 93
- Born: Beverly Louise Roberts; May 19, 1914; Brooklyn, New York, U.S.
- Died: July 13, 2009 (aged 95); Laguna Niguel, California, U.S.
- Occupations: Actress, singer, painter, executive
- Years active: 1936-1973
- Partner: Wynne Gibson (1898-1987, her death)

Beverly Louise Roberts (May 19, 1914 – July 13, 2009) was an American film and stage actress of the 1930s, as well as a singer and painter. She worked as a business executive in the entertainment industry through the 1970s.

== Career ==
Born in Brooklyn, New York, she was first spotted by a Warner Bros. talent scout while singing in a nightclub in 1935. Having performed as a stage actress prior to that, she was signed to a contract with Warner Brothers, starring in her first film in 1936, titled The Singing Kid, in which she appeared opposite Al Jolson. That same year she starred opposite Humphrey Bogart in Two Against the World. In 1937, she starred in God's Country and the Woman, Warners' first Technicolor film, in which she starred opposite George Brent. From 1937 to 1939, she starred in sixteen films. She and Errol Flynn signed with Warner Bros. on exactly the same day, but she reportedly quit films after losing key parts to other actresses including Bette Davis and Olivia de Havilland.

By 1940, she had returned to singing and stage acting. In the late 1940s and early 1950s, she was showcased in numerous radio and television appearances.

In 1954, Roberts returned to New York City and took up a new career as administrator of the "Theater Authority", whose members comprised the five entertainment unions. The organization exercised jurisdiction over performers appearing at charity functions and telethons. Roberts retired in 1977, and moved to Laguna Niguel, California, where she lived out the remainder of her life.

== Personal life ==
Actress Wynne Gibson, whom she had known since they worked together on the 1938 feature Flirting with Fate, followed her to New York; the two shared homes together on both coasts (West Babylon, Long Island, New York, and Laguna Niguel, California) until Gibson's death in 1987.

In 2000, Roberts was featured in the documentary I Used to Be in Pictures, which revisited Hollywood's early years and featured interviews with former actresses and actors of the day.

In 2002, Roberts was honored by the "Del Mar Theater" in Santa Cruz, California, and her 1936 film, China Clipper, was shown at its grand opening. That same year she was honored at the "Cinecon Film Festival" in Hollywood.

In one of her last public appearances, on October 18, 2006, she was a guest of honor at the 84th Anniversary of the opening of the Egyptian Theater in Hollywood with Sybil Jason, where she answered questions from the audience after a screening of her debut film from 1936, The Singing Kid, which starred Al Jolson.

== Death ==
Roberts died in her sleep on July 13, 2009, at age 95, in her home in Laguna Niguel from natural causes. Longtime companion of actress Wynne Gibson, Roberts never married or had children.

== Filmography ==
Year	Title	Role	Notes
1936	Two Against the World	Alma Ross	
1936	The Singing Kid	Ruth Haines	
1936	Sons o' Guns	Mary Harper	
1936	Hot Money	Grace Lane	
1936	China Clipper	Jean "Skippy" Logan	
1937	God's Country and the Woman	Jo Barton	
1937	Her Husband's Secretary	Diane Ware	
1937	The Perfect Specimen	Alicia Brackett	
1937	West of Shanghai	Jane Creed	
1937	Expensive Husbands	Laurine Lynne	
1938	Daredevil Drivers	Jerry Neeley	
1938	Making the Headlines	Jeane Sandford	
1938	Call of the Yukon	Jean Williams	
1938	Tenth Avenue Kid	Susan Holland	
1938	Flirting with Fate	Patricia Lane	
1938	The Strange Case of Dr. Meade	Bonnie	
1939	I Was a Convict	Judy Harrison	
1939	First Offenders	Susan Kent	
1939	Tropic Fury	Judith Adams	
1939	Main Street Lawyer	Flossie	
1939	Buried Alive	Joan Wright	
