= I Was a Convict =

1939 film by Aubrey Scotto

- Theatrical release poster
- Directed by: Aubrey Scotto
- Screenplay by: Robert Hardy Andrews; Ben Markson
- Story by: Robert Hardy Andrews
- Produced by: Herman Schlom
- Starring: Barton MacLane; Beverly Roberts; Clarence Kolb; Janet Beecher; Horace McMahon; Ben Welden
- Cinematography: Edward Snyder
- Edited by: Gene Milford
- Music by: Cy Feuer; William Lava; Joseph Nussbaum
- Production company: Republic Pictures
- Distributed by: Republic Pictures
- Release date: March 6, 1939
- Running time: 62 minutes
- Country: United States
- Language: English

I Was a Convict is a 1939 American crime film directed by Aubrey Scotto and written by Robert Hardy Andrews and Ben Markson. The film stars Barton MacLane, Beverly Roberts, Clarence Kolb, Janet Beecher, Horace McMahon and Ben Welden. The film was released on March 6, 1939, by Republic Pictures.

== Cast ==
- Barton MacLane as Ace King
- Beverly Roberts as Judy Harrison
- Clarence Kolb as John B. Harrison
- Janet Beecher as Mrs. Martha Harrison
- Horace McMahon as Missouri Smith
- Ben Welden as Rocks Henry
- Leon Ames as Jackson
- Clara Blandick as Aunt Sarah Scarlett
- Russell Hicks as District Attorney
- John Harmon as Matty
- Chester Clute as Evans
- Crauford Kent as Dr. Garson
- Edwin Stanley as Dr. Craile
- Harry Holman as Martin Harrison
