= Her Husband's Secretary =

1937 film by Frank McDonald

- Theatrical release poster
- Directed by: Frank McDonald
- Screenplay by: Lillie Hayward
- Story by: Crane Wilbur
- Produced by: Hal B. Wallis
- Starring: Jean Muir; Beverly Roberts; Warren Hull; Joseph Crehan; Clara Blandick; Addison Richards
- Cinematography: Arthur L. Todd
- Edited by: Clarence Kolster
- Music by: Howard Jackson
- Production company: Warner Bros. Pictures
- Distributed by: Warner Bros. Pictures
- Release date: February 26, 1937
- Running time: 61 minutes
- Country: United States
- Language: English

Her Husband's Secretary is a 1937 American drama film directed by Frank McDonald and written by Lillie Hayward. The film stars Jean Muir, Beverly Roberts, Warren Hull, Joseph Crehan, Clara Blandick and Addison Richards. The film was released by Warner Bros. Pictures on February 26, 1937.

== Plot ==
Despite being penniless, Carol Blane falls in love with Bart Kingdon, a handsome mechanic. Against the advice of her friend Diane, who suggests she pursue a relationship with her married boss, Carol marries the mechanic instead. On their wedding day, Bart is called to his dying father's bedside. His father, the wealthy Dan Kingdon, leaves his company to the newlyweds.

Bart sets to work hard, and when his father's secretary resigns because she's getting married, the young man—at Carol's suggestion—hires Diane. The new secretary is too beautiful to convince Aunt Agatha, who warns Carol of the dangers she faces. But Carol trusts in her husband's love. However, when he begins working too long hours at the office, she becomes convinced she's about to lose Bart.

== Cast ==
- Jean Muir as Carol Blane Kingdon
- Beverly Roberts as Diane Ware
- Warren Hull as Barton 'Bart' Kingdon
- Joseph Crehan as Stevenson
- Clara Blandick as Agatha 'Aunt Gussie' Kingdon
- Addison Richards as Steven Garron
- Harry Davenport as Dan Kingdon
- Gordon Hart as Mr. Blake
- Minerva Urecal as Miss Baldwin
