= Comet over Broadway =

1938 film by Busby Berkeley, John Farrow

- Directed by: Busby Berkeley; John Farrow (uncredited)
- Screenplay by: Mark Hellinger; Robert Buckner
- Based on: Comet over Broadway; 1937 story in Cosmopolitan by Faith Baldwin
- Produced by: Bryan Foy; Hal B. Wallis; Jack L. Warner
- Starring: Kay Francis; Ian Hunter; Donald Crisp
- Cinematography: James Wong Howe
- Edited by: James Gibbon
- Music by: Heinz Roemheld
- Production company: Warner Bros. Pictures
- Distributed by: Warner Bros. Pictures
- Release date: December 3, 1938
- Running time: 70 minutes
- Country: United States
- Language: English

Comet over Broadway is a 1938 American drama film starring Kay Francis, Ian Hunter and Donald Crisp. It was produced and released by Warner Bros. Pictures. John Farrow stepped in as director when Busby Berkeley became ill, but Farrow was uncredited on the film.

== Plot ==
Eve Appleton, wife of small-town garage owner Bill Appleton, has theatrical ambitions. Bill gets into an argument with a visiting actor over her, kills him accidentally, and is sent to prison. Eve, realizing her part in Bill's fate, vows to right matters, and taking her baby daughter, goes away to make her way in the theatre.

Later, Eve is forced to leave her baby girl with her friend Mrs. "Tim" Adams. Bert Ballin befriends her and they fall in love, but she moves abroad and becomes a star. Back in America, as the "Toast of Broadway", she is brought back to a realization of her former vows by Joe Grant, her hometown lawyer.

== Cast ==
- Kay Francis as Eve Appleton
- Ian Hunter as Bert Ballin
- John Litel as Bill Appleton
- Donald Crisp as Joe Grant
- Minna Gombell as "Tim" Adams
- Sybil Jason as Jackie Appleton
- Melville Cooper as Emerson
- Ian Keith as Wilton Banks
- Leona Maricle as Janet Eaton
- Ray Mayer as Brogan
- Vera Lewis as Mrs. Appleton
- Nat Carr as Haines
- Chester Clute as Willis
- Edward McWade as Harvey
- Clem Bevans as Benson

== Production ==
Warners originally announced the project in May 1937 as a vehicle for Kay Francis based on a story by Faith Baldwin.

In February 1938, the role was assigned to Bette Davis, who had just been in Jezebel. She was pulled off All Right's Reserved (which became Four's a Crowd) so she could take six weeks of a holiday. William Dieterle, originally slated to direct Four's a Crowd, was also moved to Comet over Broadway at the same time.

George Brent and Donald Crisp who had both been in Jezebel were assigned to the cast. Kay Francis went into My Bill (1938), directed by John Farrow.

Ian Keith, Walter Abel (borrowed from RKO), and Ronald Reagan were set to costar, and the film was meant to start shooting in early April 1938.

Davis was unhappy with the film. "This was the first nothing script I was given since my court battle in England", Davis later recalled, referring to the lawsuit in which she tried to win her freedom from Warner Bros. after being forced to appear in a series of mediocre films. "It was heartbreaking to me. After winning a second Academy Award...I was asked to appear again in junk."

Conferences were held to see if the script could be altered to her satisfaction. On March 30, with the film to start on Monday, Davis refused to make the movie claiming it was not up to the standard set by Jezebel.

Warners sent the script to Irene Dunne to see if she would do it. Warners pulled Davis out of her new project We Are Not Alone.

On April 1, Warners put Davis on suspension. She claimed she was ill but would have made the effort to appear in a film if it had been more than a "routine Cinderella yarn...Had it been The Life of Sarah Bernhardt or Maximillian and Carlotta, both of which have been scheduled for me, I would have attempted to go to the studio, but I did not feel justified in jeopardizing my health on behalf of such an atrocious script." Keighley was assigned to another movie.

Warners lodged a complaint against Davis with the Screen Actors Guild, which stated it needed time to investigate the matter.

Davis opted to go on suspension and remained on suspension when the studio offered her Garden of the Moon, a Busby Berkeley musical. "I was on suspension for a good part of the year following Jezebel. So much wasted time at a time when I felt my career could from then on become a truly successful one...It took a lot of courage to go on suspension. One received no salary...I couldn't afford it, nor could I afford, career-wise, to make films such as Comet over Broadway and Garden of the Moon!" The same week, Dick Powell was also suspended by Warners for refusing a part in Garden of the Moon. Margaret Lindsay and John Payne replaced them in their respective parts.

By the end of April, Davis and Hal Wallis, head of production at Warners, agreed on a truce, and Davis' next film for Warners was The Sisters (1938).

Miriam Hopkins was cast in the lead. A week later she withdrew to do another film, and the lead role was given to Kay Francis, the original star. Busby Berkeley was assigned to direct.

Filming started July 1938.

The film's title was changed during production to Curtain Call, then was changed back to Comet over Broadway.
