= Jane Wyman =

American actress (1917–2007)

Jane Wyman TOSD
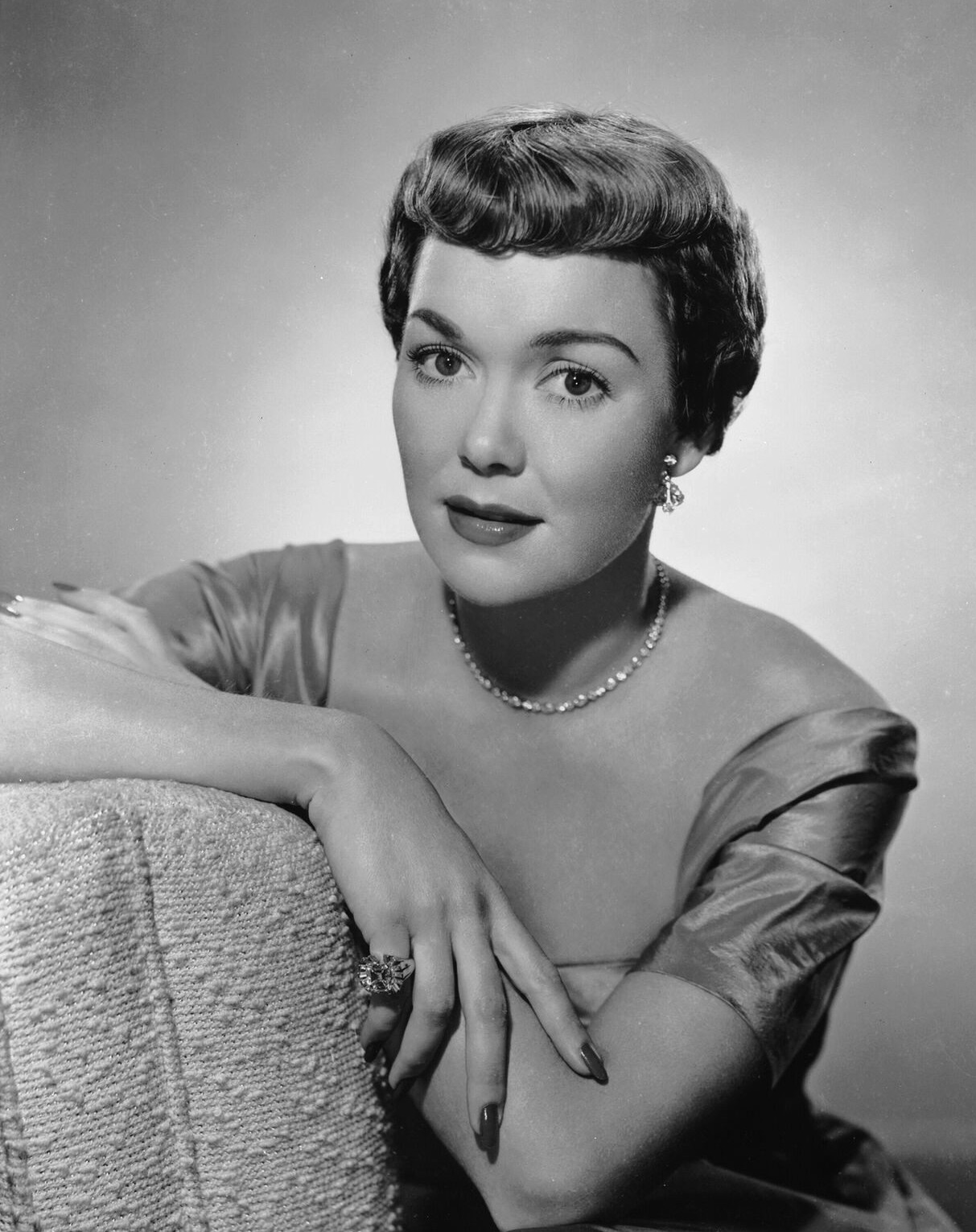
- Wyman in the 1950s
- Born: Sarah Jane Mayfield; January 5, 1917; St. Joseph, Missouri, U.S.
- Died: September 10, 2007 (aged 90); Rancho Mirage, California, U.S.
- Resting place: Forest Lawn Mortuary and Memorial Park, Cathedral City, California
- Other names: Jane Fulks, Jane Durrell
- Occupations: Actress; singer; dancer; television producer; philanthropist
- Years active: 1934–1993
- Political party: Republican
- Spouses: Ernest Wyman (m. 1933; div. 1935) Myron Futterman (m. 1937; div. 1938) Ronald Reagan (m. 1940; div. 1949) Frederick Karger (m. 1952; div. 1955) (m. 1961; div. 1965)
- Children: 3, including Maureen and Michael
- Relatives: Jennifer Howard (cousin); Descendants of Robert Coe

Jane Wyman, TOSD (/ˈwaɪmən/ WY-mən; born Sarah Jane Mayfield; January 5, 1917 – September 10, 2007) was an American actress. A star of both movies and television, she received an Academy Award for Best Actress, four Golden Globe Awards and nominations for two Primetime Emmy Awards. In 1960 she received stars on the Hollywood Walk of Fame for both motion pictures and television. She was the first wife of actor and future U.S. President Ronald Reagan.

Jane Wyman made her theatrical film debut in The Kid from Spain (1932) as an uncredited chorus girl. Wyman always maintained that she got her start in 1934 at 17 dancing in the chorus for LeRoy Prinz at Paramount Pictures. In 1936 Bryan Foy signed Wyman, at 19 years old, to her first studio contract with Warner Bros. During her tenure there, Wyman began appearing in bit roles but progressed into supporting roles, including My Love Came Back (1940), Footlight Serenade (1942), and Princess O'Rourke (1943).

By 1945, Wyman emerged as a prominent A-list actress with successful releases in The Lost Weekend (1945), The Yearling (1946), Johnny Belinda (1948), Stage Fright (1950), The Blue Veil (1951), So Big (1953), Magnificent Obsession (1954), and All That Heaven Allows (1955). She received four nominations for Academy Award for Best Actress between 1946 and 1954, winning one for Johnny Belinda (1948).

In 1955, Wyman transitioned into television, forming her own production company Lewman Productions Ltd. (co-owned with MCA Inc.). She was also made the producer, host, and frequent star of the last three seasons of NBC's Fireside Theatre, which was rebranded with Wyman's name. Her career declined shortly after, and she went into virtual retirement for several intervals of the 1960s and 1970s.

Wyman's career resurged when she appeared on the primetime soap opera Falcon Crest (1981–1990), portraying the villainous matriarch Angela Channing. She retired in 1993, after appearing in an episode of Dr. Quinn, Medicine Woman. Wyman died from natural causes in 2007, at the age of 90. She was a member of the Third Order of Saint Dominic.

== Early life ==
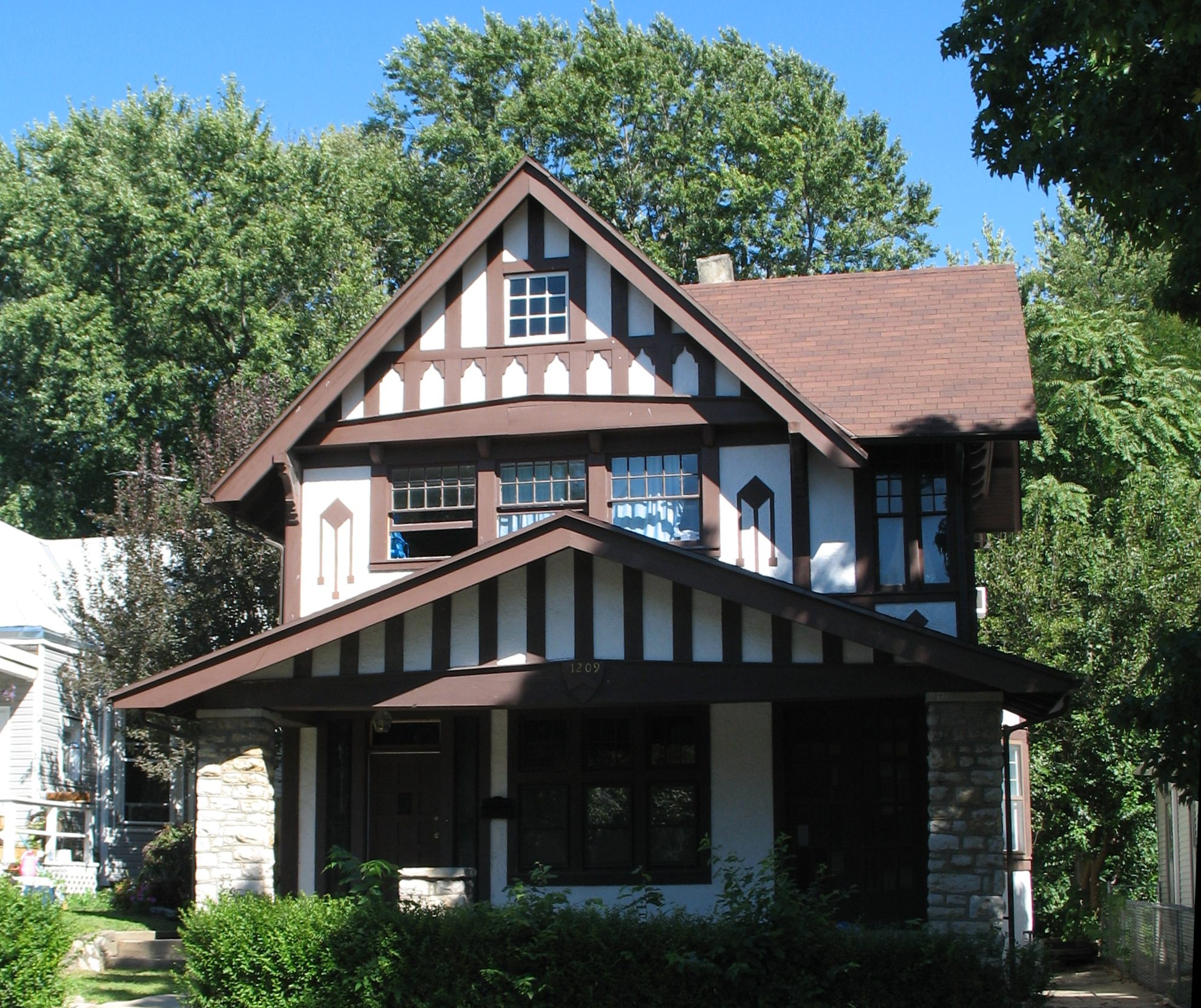
Wyman's birthplace in St. Joseph, Missouri

Sarah Jane Mayfield was born on January 5, 1917, in St. Joseph, Missouri, the only child of Gladys Hope née Christian and Manning Jeffries Mayfield. She was descended from the American colonial Robert Coe. Gladys was a doctor's stenographer and office assistant and Manning was a laborer for a meal company. She filed for divorce in October 1921 and relocated to Cleveland without Wyman and left her in the care of Emma (née Reiss ) and Richard D. Fulks, though she occasionally visited. Wyman's father died a few months later of pneumonia after taking a job in San Francisco with Southern Paciﬁc Westbound Conference, a shipping company. The obituary prepared by his family did not include Wyman. Fulks was the patrolman to the chief of detectives in St. Joseph and served a term as county collector. Wyman took their surname unofficially, using the name Jane Fulks, as they never formally adopted her. Wyman later said, "I was raised with such strict discipline that it was years before I could reason myself out of the bitterness I brought from my childhood."

Shortly after taking Wyman into her care, Emma took Wyman to Los Angeles (LA), where her two biological children, Elsie and Morie, were living, to see her father before he died. Morie was a doctor. They stayed for a few months before returning to St. Joseph, where Wyman took dance classes at Prinz's Dancing Academy. Richard died when Wyman was 11, in 1928. After his death, Emma and Wyman returned to LA to live with Elsie. There she entered Los Angeles High School, but soon after dropped out in 1932 to begin working at a Manning's coffee shop to pay for her dance classes. Wyman said she was fired for being too clumsy. She said that Emma wanted her to stay in school, but because she "goofed off in high school," she knew that she could not get into college and decided to pursue dance to help out financially. She sought out the son of her St. Joseph dance teacher, choreographer LeRoy Prinz, and, upon recommendation from his father, he coached her for chorus roles. In 1932, she landed her first role on the chorus of a film produced by Samuel Goldwyn, whose son later married her cousin, Jennifer Howard.

In 1933, Wyman returned briefly to St. Joseph where she again lived with her mother, attended Lafayette High School, (Note: In a biography relying on Wyman's word, she claimed she never returned to St. Joseph and was briefly enrolled in the University of Missouri in central Missouri. There is no record of her attendance there, while there are records of her in St. Joseph (western Missouri) in 1933.) and worked at a radio station there as a singer under the pseudonym Jane Durrell. Due to her local fame, she soon dropped out again, and returned to LA, taking on odd jobs as a manicurist and a switchboard operator. That same year, she married a salesman named Ernest Wyman, whom she divorced two years later. She lied about her age on her marriage certificate, alleging she was 19, when she was only 16 at the time.

== Career ==
=== 1932–1936: Early years in Hollywood ===
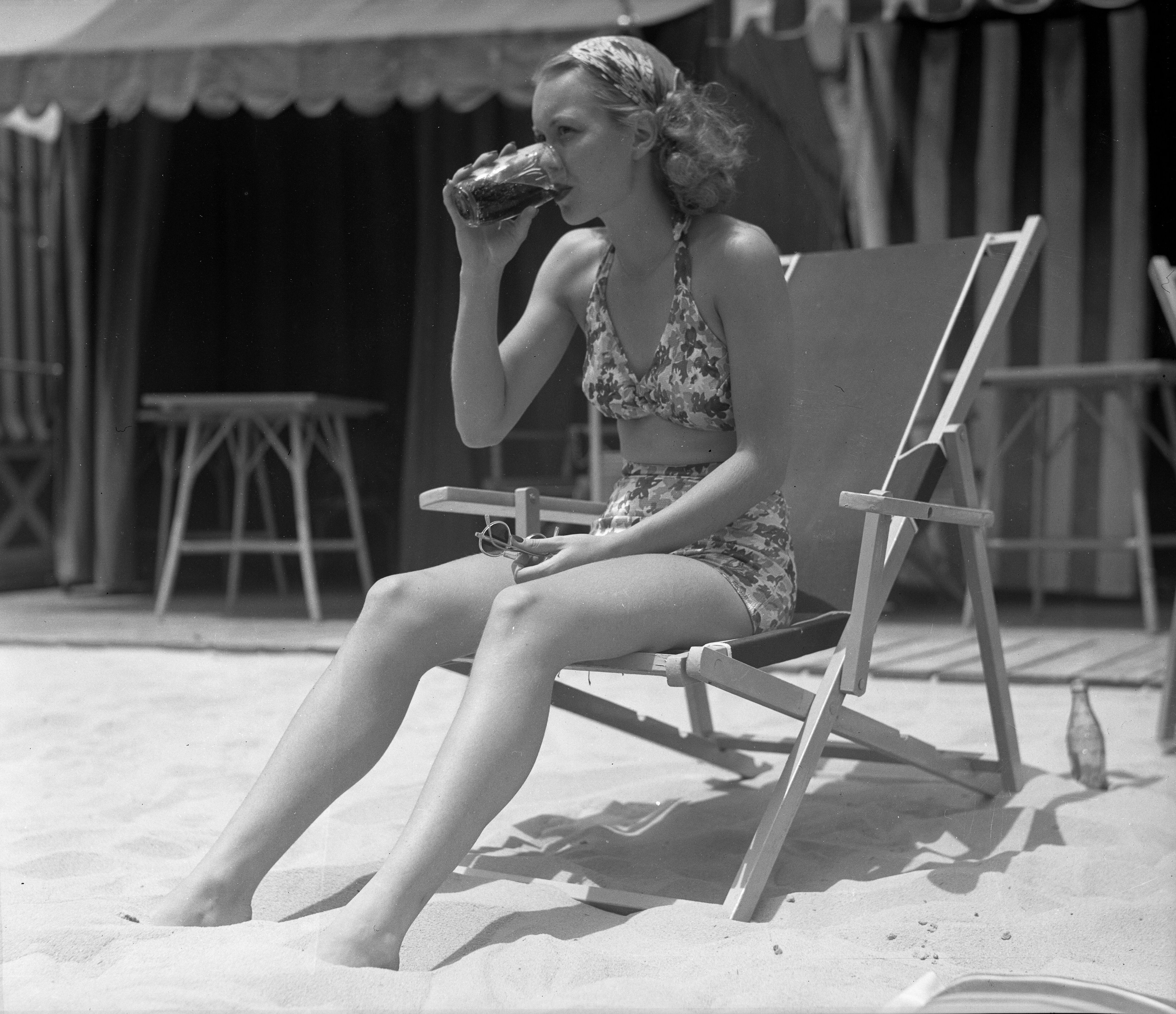
An 18-year-old Wyman on the beach in 1935

“I knew only one person who might give me a job. LeRoy Prinz, the famous Hollywood dance coach, Dad Prinz’s son”.

Jane Wyman, 1964

"This (Paramount Pictures ) is where it all started, honey…I came out here from Missouri and became one of the Leroy Prinz dancers." Jane Wyman, 1968

Jane Wyman began her 60-year show business career as an extra on The Kid from Spain (1932), Gold Diggers of 1933 (1933), Elmer, the Great (1933), and Harold Teen (1934). She had taken classes with Edward Albert Prinz (Dad Prinz) at Prinz’s Dancing Academy back in St. Joseph, Missouri. Dad Prinz’s son LeRoy Prinz was now a successful Dance Director at Paramount Pictures.

Prinz hired Wyman for the chorus of College Rhythm (1934), Rumba (1935), All the King's Horses (1935), Stolen Harmony (1935), Broadway Hostess (1935), and Anything Goes (1936). In between pictures at Paramount she did King of Burlesque (1936) and George White's 1935 Scandals (1935) at Fox.

She then went to Universal Studios for My Man Godfrey (1936).

=== 1936–1944: Career at Warner Bros. ===
Jane Wyman signed her first contract with Warner Bros. in 1936 and stayed for the next two decades. Miracle in the Rain (1956) would become the last film she completed under contract to the studio. It was released on April 7, 1956 almost exactly twenty years after she signed her inaugural contract.

“Bill (Demarest) shopped me to Bryan Foy, who ran the B movie unit at Warners, and he put me under contract-$65 a week with options for renewal every 6 months.”

Jane Wyman, 1974

At Warner Bros, Wyman was in Freshman Love (1936) and Bengal Tiger (1936), Stage Struck (1936), Cain and Mabel (1936), and Here Comes Carter (1936).

Wyman had her first big role, both singing and dancing in a Dick Foran Western The Sunday Round-Up (1936).

Wyman had small parts in Polo Joe (1936), and Gold Diggers of 1937 (1936) but a bigger one in Smart Blonde (1936), the first of the Torchy Blane series. She appeared in Ready, Willing and Able (1937), The King and the Chorus Girl (1937), and Slim (1937). She had the lead in Little Pioneer (1937), a short, and parts in The Singing Marine (1937).

By the time Wyman starred in Public Wedding (1937), a "B" picture, she was already divorced from first husband Ernest Wyman. She retained use of the surname for the remainder of her career.

She had a supporting part in Mr. Dodd Takes the Air (1937) and was the female lead in some "B" films, such as The Spy Ring (1938) (at Universal), He Couldn't Say No (1938) with Frank McHugh and Wide Open Faces (1938) with Joe E. Brown.

Wyman was borrowed by MGM to play a supporting part in The Crowd Roars (1938).

Back at Warner Brothers, Wyman was cast as one of the leads in Brother Rat (1938) for Hal B. Wallis. It co-starred Ronald Reagan, Priscilla Lane, Wayne Morris and Eddie Albert.

Wyman was borrowed by 20th Century Fox for a supporting role in Tail Spin (1939), followed by The Kid from Kokomo (1939) with Pat O'Brien and Morris. She played the title role in Torchy Blane..Playing with Dynamite (1939).

Now established, Wyman was cast in Kid Nightingale (1939) with John Payne, Private Detective (1939) with Foran, Brother Rat and a Baby (1940) with Reagan, An Angel from Texas (1940) with Albert, Flight Angels (1940), and Gambling on the High Seas (1940) with Wayne Morris.

Wyman had supporting roles in "A" films such as My Love Came Back (1940), starring Olivia de Havilland and Jeffrey Lynn. She and Reagan were in Tugboat Annie Sails Again (1940). Wyman was a supporting role to Ann Sheridan in Honeymoon for Three (1941) and was Dennis Morgan's leading lady in Bad Men of Missouri (1941).

Wyman made The Body Disappears (1941) with Jeffrey Lynn and You're in the Army Now (1941) with Jimmy Durante; in the latter she and Regis Toomey had the longest screen kiss in cinema history: 3 minutes and 5 seconds.

Wyman did Larceny, Inc. (1942) with Edward G. Robinson, and My Favorite Spy (1942) with Kay Kyser.

At Twentieth Century Fox, Wyman was a supporting actor to Betty Grable in Footlight Serenade (1942) then back at Warners supported Olivia de Havilland in Princess O'Rourke (1943).

Warners teamed Wyman with Jack Carson in Make Your Own Bed (1944) and The Doughgirls (1944), then she was top billed in Crime by Night (1944). She was one of many stars to cameo in Hollywood Canteen (1944).

=== 1945–1956: Leading roles and critical acclaim ===
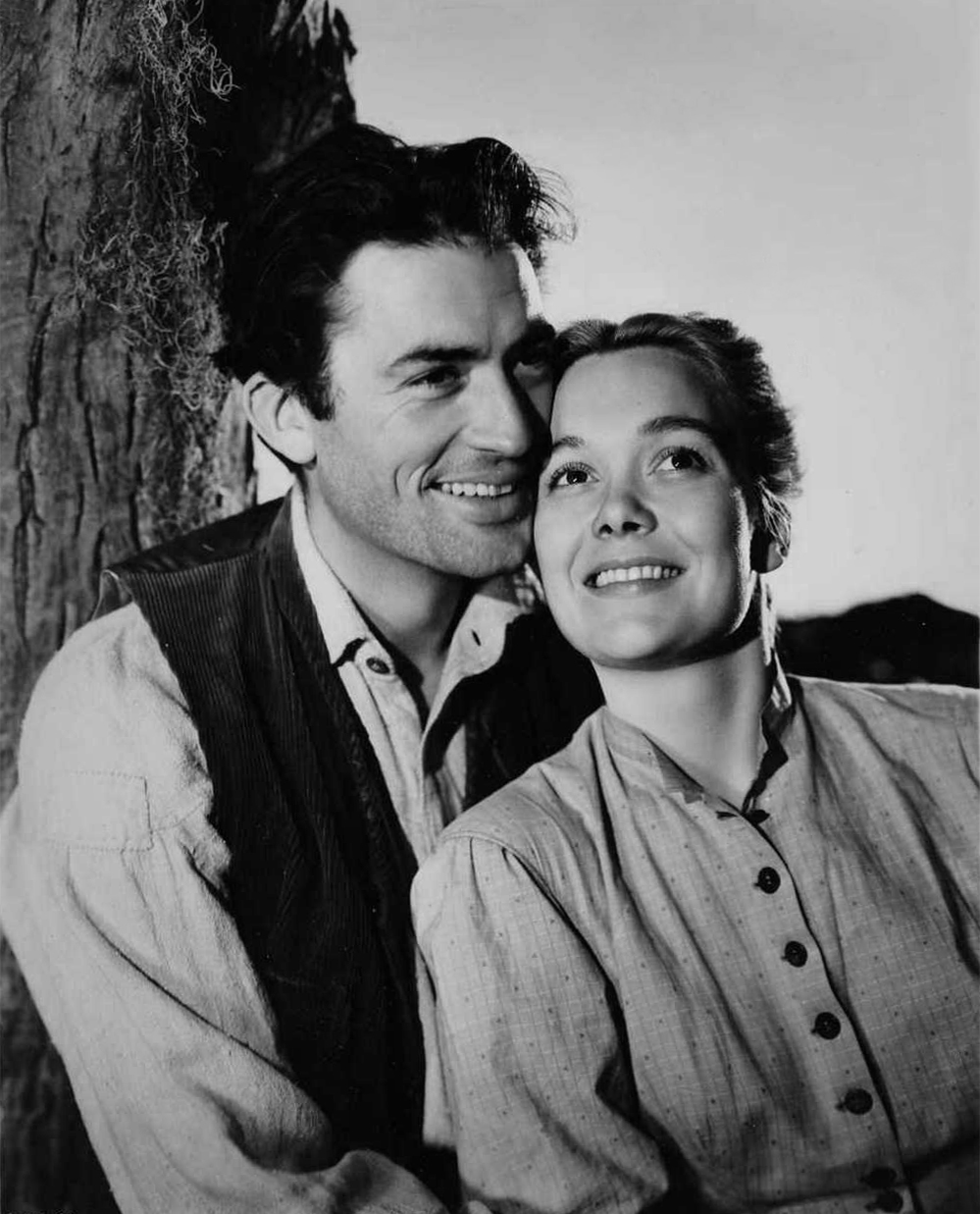
Wyman with Gregory Peck in The Yearling in 1946

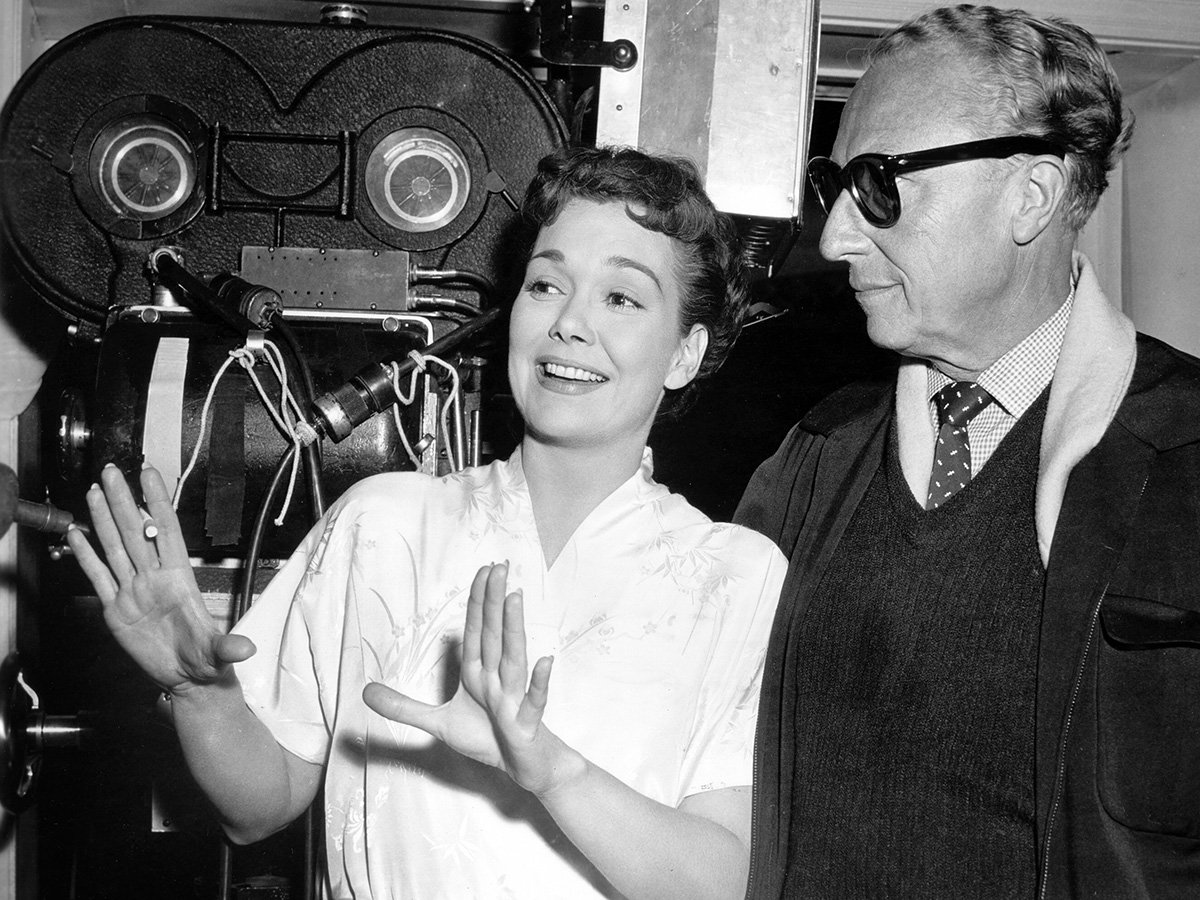
With director Douglas Sirk on set for All That Heaven Allows (1955), one of her last major roles

Wyman finally gained critical attention with The Lost Weekend (1945), made by the team of Billy Wilder and Charles Brackett. Wilder had wanted Katharine Hepburn or Barbara Stanwyck for the female lead but Brackett had been impressed by Wyman’s performance in Princess O'Rourke. Wyman called it "a small miracle".

Wyman remained a supporting actor in One More Tomorrow (1946), and Night and Day (1946). However Wyman was borrowed by MGM for the female lead in The Yearling (1946), and was nominated for the 1946 Academy Award for Best Actress.

She was leading lady for Dennis Morgan in Cheyenne (1947) and James Stewart in RKO's Magic Town (1947).

Her breakthrough role was playing a deaf-mute rape victim in Johnny Belinda (1948). Wyman spent over six months preparing for the film which was an enormous hit and won Wyman a Best Actress Oscar. She was the first person in the sound era to earn the award without speaking a line of dialogue. In an amusing acceptance speech, Wyman took her statue and said only, "I accept this, very gratefully, for keeping my mouth shut once. I think I'll do it again."

Wyman was now a top-billed star. She did two comedies, A Kiss in the Dark (1948) with David Niven and The Lady Takes a Sailor (1949) with Morgan, then made a thriller in England, Stage Fright (1950) for Alfred Hitchcock.

She played Laura in The Glass Menagerie (1950), and went to MGM for Three Guys Named Mike (1951), a popular comedy.

Frank Capra used her as Bing Crosby's leading lady in Here Comes the Groom (1951) at Paramount, then she had the lead role in RKO's The Blue Veil (1951), a melodrama that was a big box office hit and earned her an Oscar nomination.

Wyman was one of many stars in Warner Bros' Starlift (1951). She was the female lead in The Story of Will Rogers (1952) and Paramount reunited her and Crosby in Just for You (1952). Wyman expressed interest around this time of doing no more "weepy" roles.

Columbia cast her in a musical, Let's Do It Again (1953) with Ray Milland, then at Warners she was in So Big (1953), a melodrama.

Wyman had a huge success when producer Ross Hunter cast her alongside Rock Hudson in Magnificent Obsession (1954). It earned her another Oscar nomination.

Wyman and Hudson were promptly reteamed on All That Heaven Allows (1955). Pine-Thomas Productions put Wyman in Lucy Gallant (1955) with Charlton Heston. She did Miracle in the Rain (1956) with Van Johnson. Wyman was meant to follow this with Annabella but it appears to have not been made.

=== 1951–1953: Recording career ===
Jane Wyman's brief recording career with Decca Records extended between 1951 and 1953. She recorded a few solo tracks along with duets and novelty songs achieving three Billboard top 30 hits and appearing on one #1 album.

“Singing I love, and the way I sing isn’t any work at all… if the people don’t mind, why the heck should I?”

Jane Wyman, 1952

Decca Albums

- Selections from the Paramount Picture "Just for You" (1952): Bing Crosby, Jane Wyman, The Andrews Sisters, Jud Conlon's Rhythmaires and the Dave Barbour Orchestra
  - Studio cast recording of the music from the film Just for You (1952)
- Danny Kaye sings Hans Christian Andersen (1952): Danny Kaye with Jane Wyman, Gordon Jenkins and his Chorus and Orchestra
  - This studio cast recording of the music from the film Hans Christian Andersen (1952) spent 17 weeks at #1 on the Billboard “Best Selling Popular Albums Chart” in 1953. Wyman is featured most prominently duetting with Kaye on the track "No Two People" and is also credited with contributing vocals to other tracks.

Decca Singles

- "In the Cool, Cool, Cool of the Evening"/"Misto Cristofo Colombo" (1951): Bing Crosby and Jane Wyman with Matty Matlock's All Stars and the Four Hits and a Miss, from the film Here Comes the Groom (1951)
  - "In the Cool..." peaked at #11 on the Billboard charts. Hoagy Carmichael (music) and Johnny Mercer (lyrics) won the 1951 Academy Award for Best Original Song. Jane Wyman and Danny Kaye performed it at the 24th Academy Awards.
- "How d'ye Do and Shake Hands"/"Black Strap Molasses" (1951): Danny Kaye, Jimmy Durante, Jane Wyman and Groucho Marx with the Sonny Burke Orchestra
  - "Black Strap..." peaked at #29 on the Billboard charts.
- "Why Didn't I?"/"Blow Out the Candle" (1951)
- "I Love That Feelin'"/"It Was Nice While the Money Rolled In" (1951): with The Four Hits and the Dave Barbour Orchestra
- "Checkin' My Heart"/"He's Just Crazy For Me" (1952): with the Dave Barbour Orchestra, from the film Just for You (1952)
- "Zing a Little Zong"/"The Maiden of Guadalupe" (1952): Bing Crosby and Jane Wyman with Jud Conlon's Rhythmaires and the Nathan Van Cleave Orchestra, from the film Just for You (1952)
  - "Zing a..." peaked at #18 on the Billboard charts and #10 on the UK Singles charts. Harry Warren (music) and Leo Robin (lyrics) were nominated for the 1952 Academy Award for Best Original Song. Peggy Lee and Johnny Mercer performed it at the 25th Academy Awards on NBC.
- "I Never Heard You Say"/"Doodle Bug Rag" (1952): with Hoagy Carmichael
- "I'm Takin' a Slow Burn"/"It Was Great While It Lasted" (1953): with the Sonny Burke Orchestra, from the film Let's Do It Again (1953)

=== 1955–1967: Career in television ===
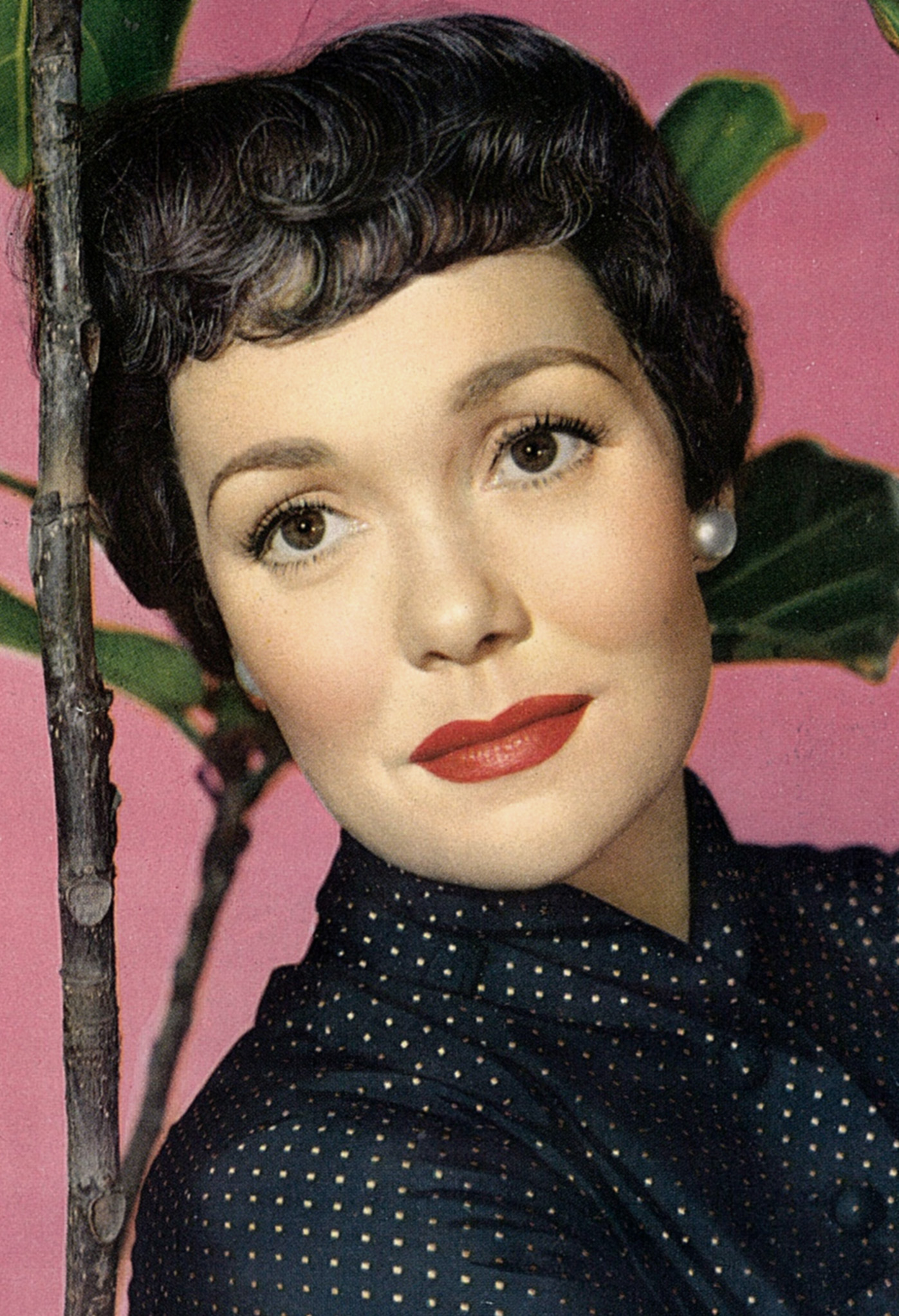
Wyman in 1953

"We thought TV was the end of the world and for some of us it was but it was very good for me."

Jane Wyman, 1981

Wyman's television acting debut was the 1955 episode "Amelia" of the anthology series General Electric Theater produced by MCA Inc.'s Revue Studios and hosted by her former husband Ronald Reagan.

On August 30, 1955 just a year after Magnificent Obsession became Wyman's biggest hit and her first #1 film at the weekly box office her eponymous weekly television anthology series made its debut on NBC.

Wyman announced her first TV series The Jane Wyman Show (1955–58) in 1955. In its first season it was known as Jane Wyman Presents the Fireside Theatre then the Jane Wyman Theatre and finally The Jane Wyman Show. Wyman hosted every episode, acted in half, and was a producer.

When The Jane Wyman Show ended Wyman was no longer a film star, but she remained in demand. She replaced the ailing Gene Tierney in Holiday for Lovers (1959) for Fox, and next appeared in Disney's Pollyanna (1960) and Bon Voyage! (1962).

Wyman continued to guest star on TV shows like Checkmate, Bob Hope Presents the Chrysler Theatre, The Investigators, Wagon Train, and Insight.

"Something happened in the sixties," she later said. "it seemed that the time didn't permit women to be part of it except in a sort of secondary sort of way which I resented. I kept telling myself 'I didn't want to play Whatever Happened to Baby Jane." So she went into semi-retirement around 1962.

=== 1968–1993: Brief retirement and career resurgence ===
Wyman focused on painting. She made the occasional acting appearance, mostly on television.

“I’m ready to work, but they just haven’t gotten around to me yet”

Jane Wyman, 1968

In 1966, Reginald Denham announced Wyman would appear in a play Wonderful Us based on the Parker–Hulme murder case but it was not produced.

She returned to films with How to Commit Marriage (1969).

Wyman continued to work in the 1970s, guest starring on My Three Sons; The Bold Ones: The New Doctors; The Sixth Sense; and Owen Marshall, Counselor at Law and her first film for television, The Failing of Raymond (1971). She starred in a pilot for a TV series Amanda Fallon but it was not picked up.

She was offered roles of "murderers, old ladies that were senile – they were awful. The weirdest kind of writing." After five years of retirement living in Carmel painting and focusing on her philanthropic work she took her first acting role since 1974. She accepted a featured role in the television movie, The Incredible Journey of Doctor Meg Laurel (1979). She then guest starred on Charlie's Angels and The Love Boat.

In the spring of 1981, Wyman's career enjoyed a resurgence when she was cast as the scheming Californian vintner and matriarch Angela Channing in The Vintage Years, which was retooled as the primetime soap opera Falcon Crest. Wyman said she wanted to make it as it was a change from "the four handkerchief bits" she was known for. "You just can't miss on a thing like this," she added.

Then relatively unknown Lorenzo Lamas appeared as Angela's irresponsible grandson, Lance Cumson. The on- and off-screen chemistry between Wyman and Lamas helped fuel the series' success.

For her role as Angela Channing, Wyman was nominated for a Soap Opera Digest Award five times (for Outstanding Actress in a Leading Role and for Outstanding Villainess: Prime Time Serial), and was also nominated for a Golden Globe award in 1983 and 1984. She won in 1984 for Best Performance By an Actress in a TV Series. Later in the show's run, Wyman suffered several health problems. In 1986 abdominal surgery caused her to miss two episodes. She was plagued with fatigue during the 1988–1989 season, and her health continued to deteriorate. Later in 1989 she collapsed on the set and was hospitalized due to problems with diabetes and a liver ailment. Her doctors told her that she should end her acting career. Wyman was absent for most of the ninth and final season of Falcon Crest in 1989–1990.

Against her doctor's advice, she returned for the final three episodes in 1990, even writing a soliloquy for the series finale. Wyman appeared in 208 of the show's 227 episodes.

After Falcon Crest, Wyman acted only once more, playing Jane Seymour's screen mother in a 1993 episode of Dr. Quinn, Medicine Woman. In all, Wyman had starred in 83 movies and two successful TV series, and was nominated for an Academy Award four times, winning once.

== Personal life ==
=== Marriages ===
Jane Wyman was married five times, to four men. Her last marriage to Fred Karger ended in 1965 and she never remarried.

==== Ernest Wyman ====
At age 16, Wyman married salesman Ernest Eugene Wyman in Los Angeles, California, on April 8, 1933. She recorded her name as 'Jane Fulks', foster parents Emma and Richard Fulks, and her age as 19 on the wedding certificate. Though the couple divorced after just two years, she retained the name Wyman professionally for the rest of her life.

==== Myron Futterman ====
Wyman was 20 when she married dress manufacturer Myron Martin Futterman in New Orleans on June 29, 1937. She wanted children but he did not, and they separated after only three months. They were divorced on December 5, 1938.

==== Ronald Reagan ====
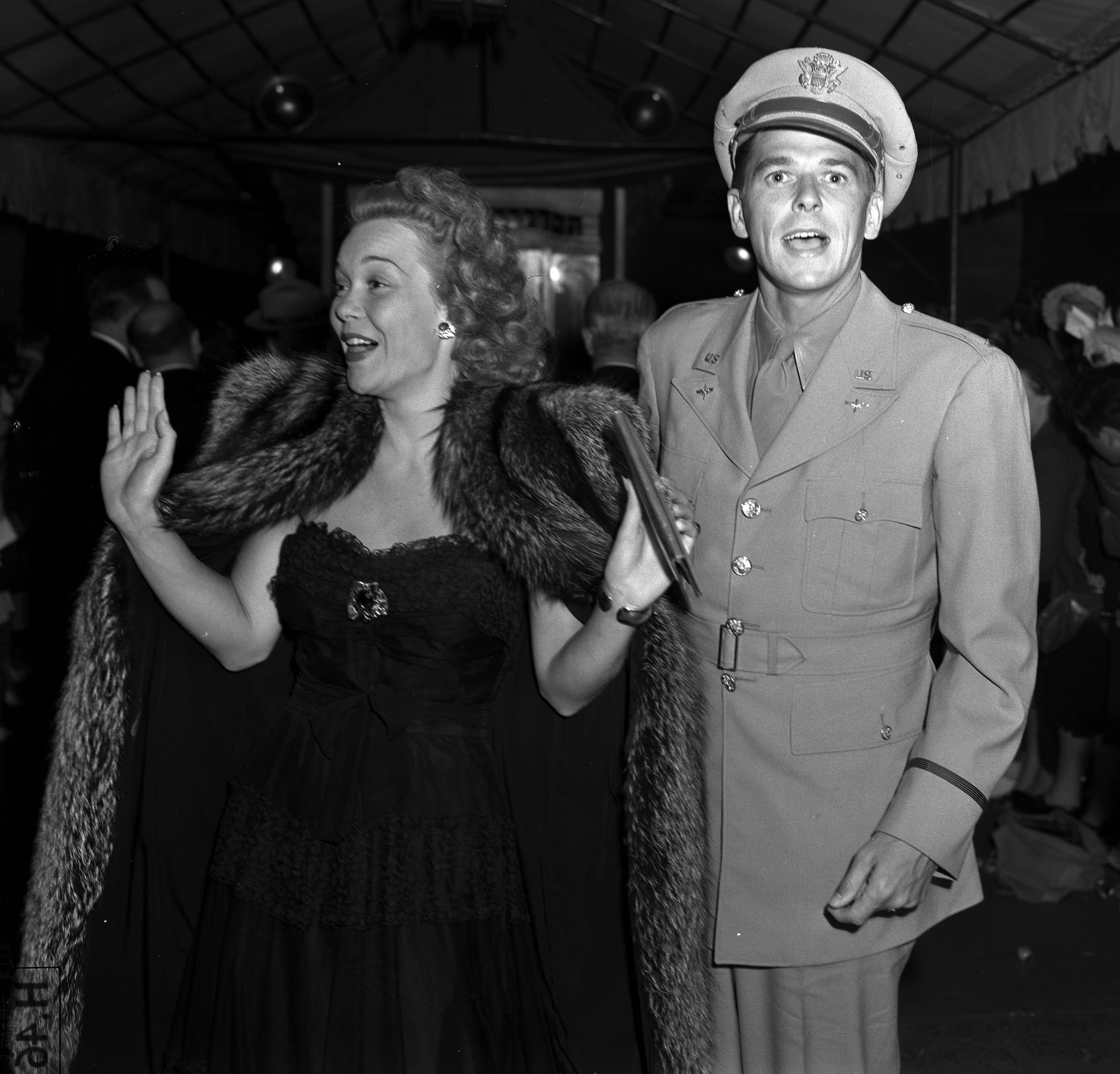
25-year-old Wyman with husband and fellow actor Ronald Reagan at the premiere of Tales of Manhattan in Los Angeles in August 1942

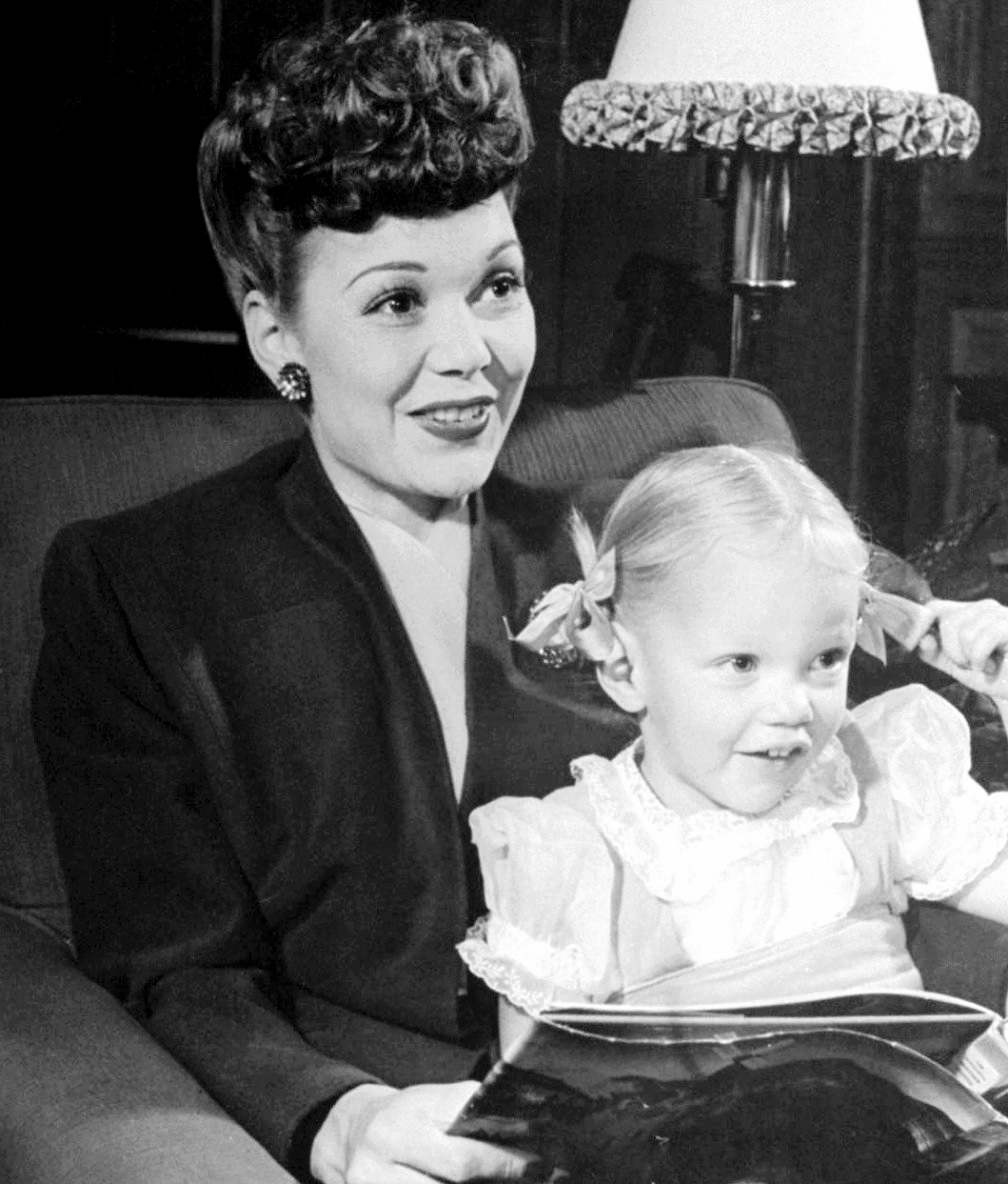
Wyman with three-year-old Maureen Reagan in 1944

In 1938, Wyman co-starred with Ronald Reagan in Brother Rat (1938). They were engaged at the Chicago Theatre, and married on January 26, 1940, at the Wee Kirk o' the Heather in Glendale, California. She and Reagan had two biological daughters, each born prematurely: Maureen in 1941, and Christine in 1947 (who died the following day). They adopted a son, Michael, in 1945.

In the aftermath of the premature birth and subsequent death of their infant daughter Christine on June 26, 1947, Wyman separated from Reagan. Wyman’s divorce from Reagan was granted on June 28, 1948 and finalized on July 18, 1949. Wyman leased a home in Palm Springs, California. Wyman, who was a registered Republican, said that their divorce was due to political differences; Ronald Reagan was still a Democrat at the time.

When Reagan was inaugurated as president on January 20, 1981, Wyman became the first ex-wife of a U.S. president in American history. Although she remained silent during Reagan's political career, she told a newspaper interviewer in 1968, after Reagan was elected governor of California in 1966, that her silence was not because she was bitter or because she did not agree with him politically:

I've always been a registered Republican. But it's bad taste to talk about former husbands and former wives, that's all. Also, I don't know a damn thing about politics.

When Reagan died in 2004, Wyman issued a statement, saying, "America has lost a great president. And a great, kind and gentle man."

==== Frederick Karger ====
On November 1, 1952, Wyman married German-American Hollywood music director and composer Frederick M. "Fred" Karger at El Montecito Presbyterian Church in Santa Barbara. They separated on November 7, 1954, and were granted an interlocutory divorce decree on December 7, 1954; the divorce was finalized on December 30, 1955.

They remarried on March 11, 1961, and Karger divorced her again on March 9, 1965. According to The New York Times' report of the divorce, the bandleader charged that the actress "had walked out on him." Wyman had a stepdaughter, Terry, from Karger's marriage to Patti Sacks.

Wyman, who had converted to Catholicism in 1953, never remarried. She was a member of the Church of the Good Shepherd and the Catholic Motion Picture Guild in Beverly Hills, California.

=== Later life ===
After Falcon Crest ended, Wyman made a guest appearance on the CBS series Dr. Quinn, Medicine Woman and then completely retired from acting; she spent her retirement painting and entertaining friends. Wyman was a recluse and made only a few public appearances in her last years in part due to suffering from arthritis. Wyman also suffered from Type 1 diabetes from a very young age. She attended the funeral of her long-time friend Loretta Young in 2000. She attended her daughter's funeral in 2001 after Maureen died of melanoma, and Ronald Reagan's funeral in 2004.

=== Death ===
On September 10, 2007, Wyman died in her sleep of natural causes at her home in Rancho Mirage, California, at age 90. Her son Michael Reagan released a statement saying:

I have lost a loving mother, my children Cameron and Ashley have lost a loving grandmother, my wife Colleen has lost a loving friend she called Mom and Hollywood has lost the classiest lady to ever grace the silver screen.

Wyman was a devout Catholic for nearly 55 years. She was lay tertiary of the Dominican Order of the Catholic Church. As a lay Dominican, the full Dominican habit is available at death, if desired. Therefore, Wyman chose to be buried in the full habit of the Dominican Order. She is interred at Forest Lawn Mortuary and Memorial Park in Cathedral City, California.

== Filmography ==
=== Film ===
Year	Title	Role	Notes
1932	The Kid from Spain	extra	Uncredited
1933	Elmer, the Great	extra	Uncredited
1933	Gold Diggers of 1933	extra	Uncredited
1934	All the King's Horses	Chorine	Uncredited, Paramount
1934	College Rhythm	Chorine	Uncredited, Paramount
1935	Broadway Hostess	Chorine	Uncredited
1935	Rumba	Chorine	Uncredited, Paramount
1935	George White's 1935 Scandals	Chorine	Uncredited, Fox
1935	Stolen Harmony	Chorine	Uncredited, Paramount
1936	King of Burlesque	Chorine	Uncredited, Fox
1936	Freshman Love	Co-Ed	Uncredited
1936	Anything Goes	Chorine	Uncredited, Paramount
1936	Bengal Tiger	Saloon Girl	Uncredited
1936	My Man Godfrey	Socialite	Uncredited, Universal
1936	Stage Struck	Bessie Funfnick	Uncredited, Warner Bros.
1936	Cain and Mabel	Chorus Girl	Uncredited, Warner Bros.
1936	Here Comes Carter	Nurse	Uncredited
1936	The Sunday Round-Up	Butte Soule	Short film
1936	Polo Joe	Girl at Polo Field	Uncredited, Warner Bros. B picture
1936	Gold Diggers of 1937	Chorus Girl	Uncredited
1937	Smart Blonde	Dixie the Hat Check Girl	
1937	Ready, Willing, and Able	Dot	
1937	The King and the Chorus Girl	Babette Latour	
1937	Slim	Stumpy's Girl	
1937	Little Pioneer	Katie Snee	Short film
1937	The Singing Marine	Joan	
1937	Public Wedding	Florence Lane Burke	
1937	Mr. Dodd Takes the Air	Marjorie Day	
1937	Over the Goal	Co-Ed	Uncredited
1938	The Spy Ring	Elaine Burdette	
1938	He Couldn't Say No	Violet Coney	
1938	Fools for Scandal	Party Guest	Uncredited
1938	Wide Open Faces	Betty Martin	
1938	The Crowd Roars	Vivian	
1938	Brother Rat	Claire Adams	
1939	Tail Spin	Alabama	
1939	The Kid from Kokomo	Marian Bronson	
1939	Torchy Blane... Playing with Dynamite	Torchy Blane	
1939	Kid Nightingale	Judy Craig	
1939	Private Detective	Myrna "Jinx" Winslow	Warner Bros., B picture
1940	Brother Rat and a Baby	Claire Terry	
1940	An Angel from Texas	Marge Allen	
1940	Flight Angels	Nan Hudson	
1940	Gambling on the High Seas	Laurie Ogden	
1940	My Love Came Back	Joy O'Keefe	
1940	Tugboat Annie Sails Again	Peggy Armstrong	
1941	Honeymoon for Three	Elizabeth Clochessy	
1941	Bad Men of Missouri	Mary Hathaway	
1941	The Body Disappears	Joan Shotesbury	
1941	You're in the Army Now	Bliss Dobson	
1942	Larceny, Inc.	Denny Costello	
1942	My Favorite Spy	Connie	
1942	Footlight Serenade	Flo La Verne	
1943	Princess O'Rourke	Jean Campbell	
1944	Make Your Own Bed	Susan Courtney	
1944	The Doughgirls	Vivian Marsden Halstead	
1944	Crime by Night	Robbie Vance	
1944	Hollywood Canteen	Jane Wyman	
1945	The Lost Weekend	Helen St. James	
1946	One More Tomorrow	Frankie Connors	
1946	Night and Day	Gracie Harris	
1946	The Yearling	Orry Baxter	Nominated – Academy Award for Best Actress
1947	Cheyenne	Ann Kincaid	
1947	Magic Town	Mary Peterman	
1948	Johnny Belinda	Belinda MacDonald	Academy Award for Best Actress; Golden Globe Award for Best Actress in a Leading Role; Photoplay Gold Medal Actress; Picturegoer Award - Best Actress
1949	A Kiss in the Dark	Polly Haines	
1949	It's a Great Feeling	Jane Wyman	
1949	The Lady Takes a Sailor	Jennifer Smith	
1950	Stage Fright	Eve Gill	
1950	The Glass Menagerie	Laura Wingfield	
1951	Three Guys Named Mike	Marcy Lewis	
1951	Here Comes the Groom	Emmadel Jones	
1951	The Blue Veil	Louise Mason	Golden Globe Award for Best Actress in a Motion Picture – Drama; Laurel Awards - Best Dramatic Performance; Picturegoer Award - Best Actress; Nominated – Academy Award for Best Actress
1952	The Story of Will Rogers	Betty Blake Rogers	
1952	Just for You	Carolina Hill	
1953	Three Lives	Commentator	Short film
1953	Let's Do It Again	Constance "Connie" Stuart	
1953	So Big	Selina DeJong	
1954	Magnificent Obsession	Helen Phillips	Picturegoer Award - Best Actress; Nominated – Academy Award for Best Actress
1955	All That Heaven Allows	Cary Scott	
1955	Lucy Gallant	Lucy Gallant	
1956	Miracle in the Rain	Ruth Wood	
1959	Holiday for Lovers	Mrs. Mary Dean	
1960	Pollyanna	Polly Harrington	
1962	Bon Voyage!	Katie Willard	
1969	How to Commit Marriage	Elaine Benson	

=== Box office ranking ===
For several years, film exhibitors voted Wyman as among the most popular stars in the country. Annual Top Ten Money Making Stars Poll rankings:

- 1949 – 25th (US), 6th (UK)
- 1952 – 15th (US)
- 1953 – 19th (US)
- 1954 – 9th (US)
- 1955 – 18th (US)
- 1956 – 23rd (US)

=== Top-Grossing Films ===
Between 1944 and 1962, Wyman was either a supporting or leading player in seven top-ten grossing films. Below are their rankings by year:

- 1944 - Hollywood Canteen - No. 8
- 1945 - The Lost Weekend - No. 8
- 1946 - The Yearling - No. 9
- 1946 - Night and Day - No. 7
- 1948 - Johnny Belinda - No. 4
- 1954 - Magnificent Obsession - No. 9
- 1962 - Bon Voyage! - No. 9

=== Television ===
Air Date	Title	Role	Notes
1955	General Electric Theater	Dr. Amelia Morrow	Episode: "Amelia"
1955–1958	The Jane Wyman Show	Various	Host, star and producer: Nominated – Primetime Emmy Award for Best Continuing Performance by an Actress (1957); Nominated – Primetime Emmy Award for Best Actress in a Leading Role in a Dramatic Series (1959)
1957	Summer Playhouse	Host	Episodes 01-07
1957	Tennessee Ernie Ford Show	Guest	Episode: Jane Wyman
1957	The Lux Show with Rosemary Clooney	Guest	Episode: 01-01
1958	The Perry Como Show	Guest	Episode: #10.36
1958	Wagon Train	Dr. Carol Ames Willoughby	Episode: "The Doctor Willoughby Story"
1958	Tennessee Ernie Ford Show	Guest	Episode: Jane Wyman(2)
1959	The Perry Como Show	Guest	Episode: #11.18
1959	Lux Video Theatre	Selena Shelby	Episode: "A Deadly Guest"
1960	Dr. Kate	Dr. Kate	Episode: "Spitfire”
1960	Startime	Host	Episode: "Academy Award Songs"
1960	Checkmate	Joan Talmadge	Episode: "Lady on the Brink"
1961	The Investigators	Elaine	Episode: "Death Leaves a Tip"
1962	Insight	Edith Stein	Episode: "The Cross in Crisis"
1962	Wagon Train	Hannah	Episode: "The Wagon Train Mutiny"
1963	The Andy Williams Show	Guest	Episode: #1.16
1963	The Andy Williams Show	Guest	Episode: #2.3
1964	The Bell Telephone Hour	Host	Episode: “The Younger Generation”
1964	Insight	Marie	Episode: "The Hermit"
1966	Bob Hope Presents the Chrysler Theatre	Addie Joslin	Episode: "When Hell Froze"
1967	Insight	Auschwitz Victim	Episode: "Why Does God Allow Men to Suffer?"
1968	The Red Skelton Show	Clara Crowley Appleby	Episode: "Clara and Me and Mama Makes Three"
1969	Insight	Catherine	Episode: "Prince in the Apple Town"
1969	The Jim Nabors Hour	Guest	Episode: #1.11
1970	My Three Sons	Sylvia Cannon	Episode: "Who Is Sylvia?"
1970	The Jim Nabors Hour	Guest	Episode: #2.15
1971	The Glen Campbell Goodtime Hour	Guest	Episode: The 42nd Annual Photoplay Awards
1971	The Failing of Raymond	Mary Bloomquist	Television film
1972	The Sixth Sense	Ruth Ames	Episode: "If I Should Die Before I Wake"
1972	The Bold Ones: The New Doctors	Dr. Amanda Fallon	Episode: "Discovery at Fourteen"
1973	The Bold Ones: The New Doctors	Dr. Amanda Fallon	Episode: "And Other Things I May Not See"
1974	Owen Marshall, Counselor at Law	Sophia Ryder	Episode: "The Desertion of Keith Ryder"
1979	The Incredible Journey of Doctor Meg Laurel	Granny Arrowroot	Television film
1980	The Love Boat	Sister Patricia	Episode: "Another Day, Another Time"
1980	Charlie's Angels	Eleanor Willard	Episode: "To See an Angel Die"
1981–1990	Falcon Crest	Angela Channing	Main cast: Golden Globe Award for Best Actress in a Television Series – Drama (1983); Nominated – Golden Globe Award for Best Actress in a Television Series – Drama (1982)
1993	Dr. Quinn, Medicine Woman	Elizabeth Quinn	Episode: "The Visitor"

== Radio appearances ==
Program	Episode	Date	Notes
Burns and Allen	Gracie's Christmas Party	December. 25, 1947	Wyman played Gracie Allen, due to the star's illness
Screen Guild Players	The Lost Weekend	January 7, 1946	
Screen Guild Players	Saturday's Children	June 2, 1947	
The Jack Benny Show	From San Francisco	March 30, 1947	
The Martin and Lewis Show	Jane Wyman	November 30, 1951	
Hollywood Star Playhouse	A Letter from Laura	February 24, 1952	
Hallmark Playhouse	Whistler's Mother	May 8, 1952	
Lux Radio Theatre	The Blue Veil	November 24, 1952	

== Awards and nominations ==
Year	Award	Category	Nominated work	Results	Ref.
1946	Academy Awards	Best Actress	The Yearling	Nominated	
1948	Academy Awards	Best Actress	Johnny Belinda	Won	
1951	Academy Awards	Best Actress	The Blue Veil	Nominated	
1954	Academy Awards	Best Actress	Magnificent Obsession	Nominated	
1948	Golden Globe Awards	Best Actress in a Leading Role	Johnny Belinda	Won	
1950	Golden Globe Awards	World Film Favorite Actress	—N/a	Won	
1951	Golden Globe Awards	Best Actress in a Motion Picture – Drama	The Blue Veil	Won	
1982	Golden Globe Awards	Best Actress in a Television Series – Drama	Falcon Crest	Nominated	
1983	Golden Globe Awards	Best Actress in a Television Series – Drama	Falcon Crest	Won	
1949	Photoplay Awards	Gold Medal - Most Popular Female Star	—N/a	Won	
1954	Photoplay Awards	Gold Medal - Favorite Film Star	—N/a	Won	
1951	Laurel Awards	Top Female Dramatic Performance	The Blue Veil	Won	
1954	Laurel Awards	Top Female Dramatic Performance	So Big	Nominated	
1954	Laurel Awards	Top Female Comedy Performance	Let's Do It Again	Nominated	
1957	Laurel Awards	Top Female Dramatic Performance	Miracle in the Rain	Nominated	
1949	Picturegoer Awards	Best Actress	Johnny Belinda	Won	
1952	Picturegoer Awards	Best Actress	The Blue Veil	Won	
1957	Primetime Emmy Awards	Best Continuing Performance by an Actress	The Jane Wyman Show	Nominated	
1959	Primetime Emmy Awards	Best Actress in a Leading Role (Continuing Character) in a Dramatic Series	The Jane Wyman Show	Nominated	

- Jane Wyman's imprints were set in concrete in front of Grauman's Chinese Theatre on September 17, 1952.
- Jane Wyman has two stars on the Hollywood Walk of Fame: one for motion pictures, at 6607 Hollywood Boulevard; and one for television, at 1620 Vine Street. Both from the inaugural placement of stars in 1960.
