= First Offenders =

1939 film by Frank McDonald

- Directed by: Frank McDonald
- Written by: J. Edward Slavin (story); Walter Wise (screenplay)
- Starring: Walter Abel; Beverly Roberts; Iris Meredith
- Cinematography: Henry Freulich
- Edited by: James Sweeney
- Production company: Columbia Pictures
- Distributed by: Columbia Pictures
- Release date: April 12, 1939
- Running time: 63 minutes
- Country: United States
- Language: English

First Offenders is a 1939 American crime film starring Walter Abel, Beverly Roberts and Iris Meredith.

== Plot ==
A District Attorney resigns from office to establish a farm that gives juvenile delinquents and first-offenders a chance to straighten out their lives before they reach the point of no return. He faces obstacles along the way from both citizens and law enforcement.
