= Jail House Blues (film) =

1942 film

- Theatrical release poster
- Directed by: Albert S. Rogell
- Screenplay by: Paul Gerard Smith; Harold Tarshis
- Story by: Paul Gerard Smith
- Produced by: Ken Goldsmith
- Starring: Nat Pendleton; Anne Gwynne; Robert Paige; Horace McMahon; Elisabeth Risdon; Warren Hymer; Samuel S. Hinds
- Cinematography: Elwood Bredell
- Edited by: Frank Gross
- Music by: Frank Skinner
- Production company: Universal Pictures
- Distributed by: Universal Pictures
- Release date: February 1, 1942
- Running time: 62 minutes
- Country: United States
- Language: English

Jail House Blues is a 1942 American comedy film directed by Albert S. Rogell and written by Paul Gerard Smith and Harold Tarshis. The film stars Nat Pendleton, Anne Gwynne, Robert Paige, Horace McMahon, Elisabeth Risdon, Warren Hymer, and Samuel S. Hinds. It was released on February 1, 1942, by Universal Pictures.

== Plot ==
Sonny McGann is a convict who takes his duty of organising the prison's upcoming convict show very seriously, however he his about to be paroled against his will. It doesn't take long until he finds his way back to jail, but now he takes some additions to the show's cast.

== Cast ==
- Nat Pendleton as Sonny McGann
- Anne Gwynne as Doris Daniels
- Robert Paige as Cliff Bailey
- Horace McMahon as Swifty
- Elisabeth Risdon as Mrs. Alyosius McGonigle McGann
- Warren Hymer as Big Foot Louie
- Samuel S. Hinds as Mr. Thomas Daniels
- Cliff Clark as Warden Boswell
- John Kelly as Snork
- Reed Hadley as Boston
- Paul Fix as Danny
- Dewey Robinson as Liverlip
