= Clara Blandick =

American actress (1876–1962)

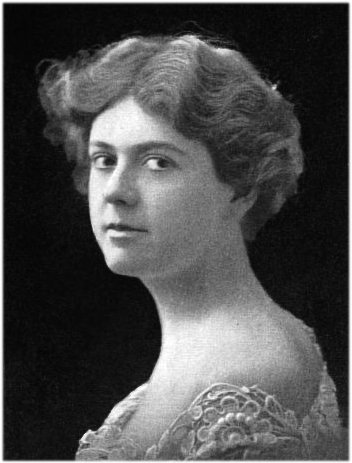
- Blandick, c. 1903
- Born: Clara Blanchard Dickey; June 4, 1876; British Hong Kong
- Died: April 15, 1962 (aged 85); Hollywood, California, U.S.
- Resting place: Forest Lawn Memorial Park, Glendale
- Occupation: Actress
- Years active: 1901–1950
- Spouse: Harry Stanton Elliott (m. 1905; div. 1912)

Clara Blandick (born Clara Blanchard Dickey; June 4, 1876 – April 15, 1962) was an American character actress of the film, stage and theater. Today's audiences may recognize her as Aunt Em in the Metro-Goldwyn-Mayer classic film adaptation of The Wizard of Oz (1939). As a character actress, she often played eccentric elderly matriarchs.

== Early life ==
Clara Blanchard Dickey was born on June 4, 1876, the daughter of Isaac B. Dickey and Harriet "Hattie" Dickey (née Mudgett), aboard the Willard Mudgett – an American ship captained by her father (named after one of her maternal relatives), and docked in Victoria Harbour, British Hong Kong. She was delivered by Captain William H. Blanchard, whose ship, Wealthy Pendleton, was anchored nearby. His wife, Clara Pendleton Blanchard, was also present. To thank the Blanchards, Captain and Mrs. Dickey named their daughter Clara Blanchard Dickey. When she became successful as an actress, she took the first syllable of "Blanchard" and the first syllable of "Dickey" to create her stage name, "Clara Blandick". While she often used 1880 as her year of birth for professional purposes, she was actually born in 1876. According to the newspaper Daily Alta California, both the Willard Mudgett and the Wealthy Pendleton were in Hong Kong Harbor in June 1876. By 1880, Captain Dickey was in command of a different ship (the William Hales), and the rest of the family was in Quincy, Massachusetts.

Her parents had settled in Quincy, Massachusetts, in 1879 or 1880. Sources vary on when the Dickeys settled there, and Clara may have been two or three years old when they made the move. In nearby Boston she met the Shakespearean actor E. H. Sothern, with whom she appeared in a production of Richard Lovelace. She moved from Boston to New York City by 1900, and began pursuing acting as a career.

== Career ==
=== Theatre ===
In 1897, Blandick was an understudy with The Walking Delegate company in Boston and her stage debut came in that production at the Tremont Theatre. In the theatre she bore a remarkable resemblance to Ethel Barrymore. In 1901, she portrayed Jehanneton in the play If I Were King, which ran for 56 performances at Garden Theatre (an early component of Madison Square Garden). She achieved acclaim for her role in The Christian.

In 1903, she played Gwendolyn in the Broadway premiere of E. W. Hornung's Raffles, The Amateur Cracksman opposite Kyrle Bellew. She started in pictures with the Kalem company in 1908 and made a number of appearances such as in The Maid's Double in 1911. Blandick finally broke onto Broadway in 1912, when she was cast as Dolores Pennington in Widow By Proxy which ran for 88 performances through early 1913 at George M. Cohan's Theatre on Broadway. During this same period she appeared on stages throughout the Northeastern United States as a member of Sylvester Poli's stock theater company, The Poli Players. She continued to achieve acclaim for her stage work, playing a number of starring roles, including the lead in Madame Butterfly. By 1914, she was back on the silver screen, as Emily Mason in the film Mrs. Black is Back.

During World War I, Blandick performed some overseas volunteer work for the American Expeditionary Force in France. She also continued to act on stage and occasionally in silent pictures. In 1924, she earned rave reviews for her supporting role in the Pulitzer Prize winning play Hell-Bent Fer Heaven, which ran for 122 performances at the Klaw Theatre in New York (later renamed CBS Radio Playhouse No. 2).

=== Move to Hollywood ===
In 1929, Blandick moved to Hollywood. By the 1930s, she was well known in theatrical and film circles as an established supporting actress. Though she landed roles like Aunt Polly in the 1930 film Tom Sawyer (a role she reprised in the 1931 film Huckleberry Finn), she spent much of the decade as a character actor, often going uncredited. In Pre-Code films she often played mothers, including those of characters played by Joan Crawford (Possessed) and Joan Blondell (Three on a Match). At a time when many actors were permanently attached to a single studio, she played a wide number of bit parts for almost every major Hollywood studio (though she would later be under contract with 20th Century Fox). In 1930, she acted in nine films. In 1931, she was in thirteen films. As is the case with some other busy character actors, it is difficult to make an exact tally of the films in which Blandick appeared, but a reasonable estimate would fall between 150 and 200.

=== The Wizard of Oz ===
In 1939, Blandick landed her most memorable minor role – Aunt Em in MGM's classic The Wizard of Oz. Though it was a small part (Blandick filmed all her scenes in a single week), the character was an important symbol of protagonist Dorothy's quest to return home to her beloved aunt and uncle. (Aunt Em and Uncle Henry are the only characters from the beginning of the movie, in black-and-white Kansas, not to have alter ego characters in the Land of Oz.) Blandick beat May Robson, Janet Beecher, and Sarah Padden for the role, and earned $750 per week. Some believed Aunt Em's alter ego was to be Glinda, the Good Witch of the North but the studio opted to use different actresses for each role. The reason was they wanted someone younger looking to contrast the good witch from the bad witches, although Billie Burke, who played Glinda, was only eight years younger. Blandick is only credited in the movie's closing credits.

=== Later years ===
After The Wizard of Oz, Blandick returned to her staple of character acting in supporting and bit roles. She would continue to act in a wide variety of roles in dozens of films. She played Mrs. Morton Pringle in 1940's Anne of Windy Poplars, a department store customer in the Marx Brothers film The Big Store and a nurse in It Started with Eve in 1941, a fashionable socialite in the 1944 musical Can't Help Singing, and a cold-blooded murderer in the 1947 mystery Philo Vance Returns. Her final two roles both came in 1950 – playing a housekeeper and a landlady in Key to the City and Love That Brute, respectively. She retired from acting at the age of 74 and went into seclusion at the Hollywood Roosevelt Hotel.

== Personal life and death ==
Blandick was married on December 7, 1905, in Manhattan, to mining engineer Harry Stanton Elliott. Prior to his mining career, he had been an actor, and they had starred together in The Christian. They separated by 1910, and are believed to have divorced in 1912. They had no children.

Throughout the 1950s, Blandick's health steadily began to deteriorate. Her eyesight began to fail and she was suffering from severe, painful arthritis. On April 15, 1962, aged 85, she returned to her Hollywood home from Palm Sunday services at her church. She began rearranging her room, placing her favorite photos and memorabilia in prominent places. She laid out her resume and a collection of press clippings from her lengthy career. She dressed immaculately in an elegant royal blue dressing gown, and with her hair properly styled, she took an overdose of sleeping pills. She lay down on a couch, covered herself with a gold blanket over her shoulders, and tied a plastic bag over her head. She left the following note: "I am now about to make the great adventure. I cannot endure this agonizing pain any longer. It is all over my body. Neither can I face the impending blindness. I pray the Lord my soul to take. Amen."

Blandick's landlady, Helen Mason, discovered her body later that day. Her ashes were interred at the Great Mausoleum, Columbarium of Security at Forest Lawn Memorial Park, Glendale along with those of her sister, Marcia D. Young, and Marcia's husband, George A. Young. Blandick's ashes lie just yards from those of Charley Grapewin, her on-screen husband in The Wizard of Oz.

== Stage credits ==
Note: The list below is limited to New York/Broadway theatrical productions.

Broadway credits of Clara Blandick
Date	Title	Role	Ref(s)
Oct 14, 1901 - Dec 1901	If I Were King	Jehanneton	
Oct 27, 1903 - Mar 1904	Raffles, the Amateur Cracksman	Gwendolyn Conron	
Dec 21, 1903 - Jan 1904	The Sacrament of Judas	Jeffick Gillou	
Mar 28, 1904 - May 1904	The Two Orphans	Marianne	
Apr 06, 1908 - May 1908	The Royal Mounted	Rosa Larabee	
Feb 24, 1913 - May 1913	Widow by Proxy	Dolores Pennington	
Apr 21, 1913 - May 1913	Mrs. Peckham's Carouse		
Aug 23, 1915 - Oct 1915	No. 13 Washington Square		
Feb 01, 1917 - May 1917	The Wanderer		
Mar 31, 1923 - May 1923	The Enchanted Cottage	Mrs. Minnett, First Witch	
Jan 04, 1924 - Apr 1924	Hell-Bent Fer Heaven	Meg Hunt	
Sep 28, 1925 - Dec 12, 1925	Applesauce	Mrs. Jennie Baldwin	
Oct 05, 1926 - Oct 1926	The Good Fellow	Mrs. Kent	
Apr 01, 1927 - Apr 1927	Fog-Bound	Mrs. Penny	
May 11, 1927 - Jun 1927	Kempy	"Ma" Bence	
Nov 01, 1927 - Nov 1927	Ink	Hester Trevelyan	
Feb 01, 1928 - Feb 1928	La Gringa	Sarah Bowditch	
Mar 14, 1928 - Mar 1928	The Buzzard	Mrs. Burns	
May 21, 1928 - Jul 1929	Skidding	Mrs. Hardy	
Jan 11, 1929 - Jan 1929	Skyrocket	Mrs. Ewing	

== Filmography ==
Film credits of Clara Blandick
Year	Title	Role	Studio/Distributor	Ref(s)
1911	The Maid's Double		Short	
1914	Mrs. Black Is Back	Emily Mason	Famous Players Film Company	
1916	The Stolen Triumph	Mrs. Rowley	Rolfe Photoplays	
1917	Peggy, the Will O' the Wisp	Mrs. Donnelly	Rolfe Photoplays	
1929	Wise Girls	Ma	MGM	
1929	One Hysterical Night	Masquerade Guest - Little Bo Peep (uncredited)	Universal	
1930	Romance	Abigail Armstrong	MGM	
1930	The Girl Said No	Mrs. Ward	MGM	
1930	Tom Sawyer	Aunt Polly	Paramount	
1930	The Sins of the Children	Martha Wagenkampf	MGM	
1930	Men Are Like That	Ma Fisher	Paramount Famous Players Film Company	
1930	Burning Up	Mrs. Minnie Winkle (uncredited)	Paramount	
1931	Daybreak	Frau Hoffman	MGM	
1931	New Adventures of Get Rich Quick Wallingford	Mrs. Layton	MGM	
1931	Once a Sinner	Mrs. Mason	Fox Film Corporation	
1931	Possessed	Marian's Mother	MGM	
1931	Bought!	Mrs. Sprigg	Warner Bros.	
1931	It's a Wise Child	Mrs. Stanton	MGM	
1931	The Easiest Way	Agnes	MGM	
1931	Huckleberry Finn	Aunt Polly	Paramount	
1931	I Take This Woman	Sue Barnes	Paramount Publix Corp.	
1931	Murder at Midnight	Aunt Julia Gray Kennedy	Tiffany Pictures	
1931	The Drums of Jeopardy	Abbie Krantz	Tiffany	
1931	Inspiration	Madeleine's Mother (uncredited)	MGM	
1931	Laughing Sinners	Salvation Army Woman (uncredited)	MGM	
1932	Two Against the World	Aunt Agatha	Warner Bros.	
1932	The Strange Case of Clara Deane	Mrs. Lyons	Paramount	
1932	Rockabye	Brida	RKO Pictures	
1932	Shopworn	Mrs. Livingston	Columbia Pictures	
1932	Life Begins	Mrs. West	Warner Bros.	
1932	The Wet Parade	Mrs. Tarleton	MGM	
1932	Three on a Match	Mrs. Keaton	Warner Bros.	
1933	Three Cornered Moon	Landlady (uncredited)	Paramount	
1933	Charlie Chan's Greatest Case	Minerva Winterslip	Fox	
1933	The Bitter Tea of General Yen	Mrs. Jackson	Columbia	
1933	The Mind Reader	Auntie	First National Pictures	
1933	Ever in My Heart	Anna	Warner Bros.	
1933	Turn Back the Clock	Joe's Mother	MGM	
1933	One Sunday Afternoon	Mrs. Bush	Paramount	
1933	Child of Manhattan	Aunt Sophie	Columbia	
1933	Going Hollywood	Miss Perkins	MGM	
1934	Beloved	Miss Murfee	Universal	
1934	Harold Teen	Ma Lovewell	Warner Bros.	
1934	Jealousy	Mrs. Douglas	Columbia	
1934	As the Earth Turns	Cora	Warner Bros.	
1934	The Girl from Missouri	Miss Newberry	MGM	
1934	The Show-Off	Ma Fisher	MGM	
1934	Sisters Under the Skin	Miss Gower	Columbia	
1934	Fugitive Lady	Aunt Margaret	Columbia	
1934	Broadway Bill	Mrs. Peterson	Columbia	
1935	The President Vanishes		Walter Wanger Productions	
1935	Transient Lady	Eva Branham	Universal	
1935	Princess O'Hara	Miss Van Cortland	Universal	
1935	Straight from the Heart	Mrs. Anderson	Universal	
1935	Party Wire	Mathilda Sherman	Columbia	
1935	The Winning Ticket	Aunt Maggie	MGM	
1936	Fury	Judge's wife	MGM	
1936	The Case of the Velvet Claws	Judge Mary F. O'Daugherty	First National	
1936	Hearts Divided	Aunt Ellen	First National	
1936	Make Way for a Lady	Mrs. Dell	RKO	
1936	In His Steps	Martha Adams	B. F. Zeidman Productions, Inc.	
1936	The Gorgeous Hussy	Louisa Abbott	MGM	
1936	The Trail of the Lonesome Pine	Landlady	Walter Wanger	
1936	Anthony Adverse	Mrs. Jorham	Warner Bros.	
1937	You Can't Have Everything	Townswoman	20th Century Fox	
1937	Wings Over Honolulu	Evie Curtis	Universal	
1937	Her Husband's Secretary	Agatha Kingdon	Warner Bros.	
1937	Small Town Boy	Mrs. Armstrong	Grand National Films Inc.	
1937	A Star is Born	Aunt Mattie	Selznick International Pictures	
1937	The Road Back	Willy's Mother	Universal	
1938	Swing, Sister, Swing	Ma Sisler	Universal	
1938	Crime Ring	Phoebe Sawyer	RKO	
1938	My Old Kentucky Home	Julia "Granny" Blair	Crescent Pictures Corp	
1938	Tom Sawyer, Detective	Aunt Polly	Paramount	
1938	Professor Beware	Mrs. Green - Landlady	Harold Lloyd Corp	
1939	The Adventures of Huckleberry Finn	Miss Watson	MGM	
1939	I Was a Convict (1939)	Aunt Sarah Scarlett	Republic Pictures	
1939	Swanee River	Mrs. Griffin	20th Century	
1939	Drums Along the Mohawk	Mrs. Borst	20th Century	
1939	The Wizard of Oz	Aunt Em	MGM	
1939	The Star Maker	Miss Esther Jones John Duke	Paramount	
1939	Main Street Lawyer	Uncredited	Republic	
1940	North West Mounted Police	Mrs. Burns	Cecil B. DeMille	
1940	Youth Will Be Served	Miss Bradshaw	20th Century	
1940	Dreaming Out Loud	Jessica Spence	Voco Productions	
1940	Tomboy	Aunt Martha	Monogram Pictures	
1940	Anne of Windy Poplars	Mrs. Morton Pringle	RKO	
1940	Alice in Movieland		Warner Bros.	
1941	The Big Store	Customer	MGM	
1941	Private Nurse	Miss Phillips	20th Century	
1941	The Wagons Roll at Night	Mrs. Williams	Warner Bros.	
1941	The Nurse's Secret	Miss Juliet Mitchell	Warner Bros.	
1941	It Started with Eve	Nurse	Universal	
1941	One Foot in Heaven	Sister Watkins	Warner Bros.	
1941	The Get-Away	Mrs. Higgins	MGM	
1942	Rings on Her Fingers	Mrs. Beasley	20th Century	
1942	Lady in a Jam	Tourist	Universal	
1942	Road to Morocco	Aunt Lucy in Photo (uncredited)	Paramount	
1942	Gentleman Jim	Woman on train (uncredited)	Warner Bros.	
1943	Dixie	Mrs. Mason	Paramount	
1943	Heaven Can Wait	Grandmother Van Cleve	20th Century	
1943	Du Barry Was a Lady	Old lady on subway	MGM	
1944	Can't Help Singing	Aunt Cissy	Universal	
1944	Shadow of Suspicion	Mother Randall	Monogram	
1945	Frontier Gal	Abigail	Universal	
1945	Pillow of Death	Belle Kincaid	Universal	
1946	She-Wolf of London	Mrs. McBroom	Universal	
1946	So Goes My Love	Mrs. Meade	Skirball-Manning Productions, Inc.	
1946	A Stolen Life	Martha	Warner Bros.	
1946	People Are Funny	Grandma Wilson	Pine-Thomas Productions	
1946	Claudia and David	Mrs. Barry	20th Century	
1947	Philo Vance Returns	Stella Blendon	Producers Releasing Corporation	
1947	Life with Father	Miss Wiggins	Warner Bros.	
1948	The Bride Goes Wild	as Aunt Pewtie	MGM	
1949	Mr. Soft Touch	Susan Balmuss	Columbia	
1949	Roots in the Soil		Wilding Picture Productions	
1950	Key to the City	Liza	MGM	
1950	Love That Brute	Landlady	20th Century	
