= Little Pioneer =

1937 film

- Directed by: Bobby Connolly
- Written by: Anthony Coldeway
- Produced by: Samuel Sax
- Starring: Sybil Jason; Jane Wyman
- Production company: Vitaphone
- Distributed by: Vitaphone
- Release date: July 3, 1937
- Running time: 19 minutes
- Country: United States
- Language: English

Little Pioneer, originally titled Zululand, was a 1937 Warner Brothers/Vitaphone short subject.

== Plot outline ==
In 1880 South Africa, young Betsy has an adventure involving Zulu tribesmen, Dutch settlers, the Voortrekkers, and her older brother's romance of Katie Snee.

== Cast ==
- Sybil Jason .... Betsy Manning
- Jane Wyman .... Katie Snee
- Frederick Vogeding
- Carlyle Moore Jr.
- Bodil Rosing
- Jess Lee Brooks .... Singing African prince (uncredited)
