= The Captain's Kid =

1936 film by Nick Grinde

- Directed by: Nick Grinde
- Screenplay by: Tom Reed
- Story by: Earl Felton
- Produced by: Bryan Foy
- Starring: May Robson; Sybil Jason; Guy Kibbee; Jane Bryan; Fred Lawrence; Dick Purcell
- Cinematography: Ernest Haller
- Edited by: Jack Saper
- Music by: Howard Jackson
- Production company: First National Pictures
- Distributed by: Warner Bros. Pictures
- Release date: November 14, 1936
- Running time: 72 minutes
- Country: United States
- Language: English

The Captain's Kid is a 1936 American comedy film directed by Nick Grinde and written by Tom Reed. The film stars May Robson, Sybil Jason, Guy Kibbee, Jane Bryan, Fred Lawrence and Dick Purcell. This was the last film produced by First National Pictures, after the decision to liquidate First National by the parent company, and it was theatrically released by Warner Bros. Pictures on November 14, 1936.

== Plot ==
Asa Plunkett is put in jail for ten days for drunkenness by Sheriff Pengast. Abigail Prentiss and her Aunt Marcia arrive from New York. Abigail's big sister, Betsy Ann, who is in love with Tom Squires, is home from school. Abigail visits Asa, but Marcia takes her away from him. Asa says Marcia didn't marry him because of his drinking. When Abigail finds an old treasure map in the attic, she sneaks out at night and gives it to Asa. Abigail helps Asa escape and he goes to the sheriff with Tom, asking to have some time off. Asa shows the map to Chester, who goes on a boat with Mabel, while Asa goes in Tom's boat. Tom sings "Drifting Along" with Abigail and Betsy as stowaways and Abigail sings "I am the Captain's Kid". On Bird Island, Asa has Abigail and Betsy and Tom take the oath of a pirate. Marcia Prentiss gets the sheriff to go after Asa for kidnapping. Asa and Tom dig and find a treasure chest. Chester gets a gun confiscated by Abigail, who gives it to Asa. While Mabel fights with Asa, he shoots Chester. No sooner have Aunt Marcia and Sheriff Pengast find that Chester is dead than Asa is arrested by Deputy Jake. Mr. Bridges plans to defend Asa until they learn that the treasure belongs to the town. Marcia is angry with Betsy and Abigail and warns Betsy Ann that she and Tom are never meant to be. Abigail is spanked by her aunt in court and the jury recommends a trial. Betsy blames Abigail for the trouble being caused, Abigail gets John to drive her to see Asa. She weeps sadly and kisses him goodbye. John is knocked out by Mabel since John knows her from prison. Abigail and John chase her car until it crashes and the police arrest Mabel. The sheriff tells Asa that he killed a murderer and Asa is free with a $10,000 reward and the treasure. Betsy and Abigail and Aunt Marcia make up and Betsy Ann is allowed to marry Tom. Marcia and Asa will marry too. but Asa and Abigail go fishing for mackerel in the end.

== Cast ==
- May Robson as Aunt Marcia Prentiss
- Sybil Jason as Abigail Prentiss
- Guy Kibbee as Asa Plunkett
- Jane Bryan as Betsy Ann Prentiss
- Fred Lawrence as Tom Squires
- Dick Purcell as George Chester
- Mary Treen as Libby
- Gus Shy as John 'Johnny' Shores
- Maude Allen as Mabel
- Granville Bates as Sheriff Pengast
- Victor Potel as Deputy Jake Hutchinson
- George E. Stone as Steve
- Gordon Hart as Mayor Bart Cabot
- Tom Wilson as Bill Brown
- Robert Emmett Keane as Mister Bridges
- Jack Wise as Weymouth
