= God's Country and the Woman =

1937 film by William Keighley

- Theatrical release poster
- Directed by: William Keighley
- Screenplay by: Norman Reilly Raine
- Story by: Peter Milne; Charles Belden
- Based on: God's Country and the Woman; 1915 novel by James Oliver Curwood
- Produced by: Louis F. Edelman
- Starring: George Brent; Beverly Roberts; Barton MacLane; Robert Barrat; Alan Hale, Sr. Joe King
- Cinematography: Tony Gaudio
- Edited by: Jack Killifer
- Music by: Max Steiner
- Color process: Technicolor
- Production company: Warner Bros. Pictures
- Distributed by: Warner Bros. Pictures
- Release date: January 10, 1937 (New York)
- Running time: 85 minutes
- Country: United States
- Language: English

God's Country and the Woman is a 1937 American Technicolor lumberjack drama film directed by William Keighley and written by Norman Reilly Raine. The film stars George Brent, Beverly Roberts, Barton MacLane, Robert Barrat, Alan Hale, Sr. and Joe King. The film is based on a 1915 novel by James Oliver Curwood entitled God's Country and the Woman. The film premiered in New York on January 10, 1937.

== Plot ==
The Russett Company and Barton Lumber Company compete for lumber in the American Northwest.

== Cast ==
- George Brent as Steve Russett
- Beverly Roberts as Jo Barton
- Barton MacLane as Bullhead
- Robert Barrat as Jefferson Russett
- Alan Hale, Sr. as Bjorn Skalka
- Joe King as Red Munro
- El Brendel as Ole Olson
- Addison Richards as Gaskett
- Roscoe Ates as Gander Hopkins
- Billy Bevan as Plug Hat
- Joseph Crehan as Jordan
- Bert Roach as Kewpie
- Victor Potel as Turpentine
- Mary Treen as Miss Flint
- Herbert Rawlinson as Doyle
- Harry Hayden as Barnes
- Pat Moriarity as Tim O'Toole
- Max Wagner as Gus
- Susan Fleming as Grace Moran

== Production ==
God's Country and the Woman is Warner Bros.' first feature-length film in three-strip Technicolor. It was filmed on location near Mount St. Helens in Washington and features extensive footage of logging operations, including a Willamette steam locomotive in operation.

Production began on July 6, 1936 and concluded by November.

== Reception ==
In a contemporary review for The New York Times, critic Frank S. Nugent wrote: "The picture—like most Curwood products—is a direct and hearty melodrama in which a punch on the jaw counts more than three pages of small talk and leaves, besides, a livid welt for the color cameras to record."

Writing for Night and Day in 1937, Graham Greene wrote that "it isn't a very good film" and: "An attempt at fast cutting and quick dissolves confirms our belief that colour will put the film back technically twelve years".

Variety wrote that the "hackneyed and incredible story" led to many of the actors giving melodramatic performances and that the director, William Keighley, "has tried to pound some action into it …. perhaps he figured that the yarn would be even tougher to take if played straight." The reviewer wrote favourably on the use of Technicolor: "Photography is good and the color job A1. But one wishes there was a bit better reason for it."

In their March, 1937 edition, Modern Screen gave the film a two-star review and wrote that "definite progress is being made with color photography, as proved by some scenic shots of breathtaking beauty" but that there was "room for improvement" in the photography of the actors, as the "harsh skin tones" were jarring. Supporting actors, Alan Hale, Barton MacLane and Victor Potel were complimented for their performances and "comedy is nicely handled" by El Brendel , Roscoe Ates and Billy Bevan.

== See also ==
- God's Country and the Law (1921)
- God's Country (1946)
