= The Singing Kid =

1936 film by William Keighley

- Theatrical release poster
- Directed by: William Keighley
- Screenplay by: Warren Duff; Pat C. Flick
- Story by: Robert Lord
- Produced by: Robert Lord
- Starring: Al Jolson; Sybil Jason; Beverly Roberts; Edward Everett Horton; Lyle Talbot; Allen Jenkins
- Cinematography: George Barnes
- Edited by: Thomas Richards
- Music by: Score: Ray Heindorf; Heinz Roemheld; Songs: Harold Arlen (music); Yip Harburg (lyrics)
- Production company: First National Pictures
- Distributed by: Warner Bros. Pictures
- Release date: April 11, 1936
- Running time: 85 minutes
- Country: United States
- Language: English

The Singing Kid is a 1936 American musical romance film directed by William Keighley and written by Warren Duff and Pat C. Flick. Starring Al Jolson, Sybil Jason, Beverly Roberts, Edward Everett Horton, Lyle Talbot and Allen Jenkins, it was released by Warner Bros. Pictures on April 11, 1936.

== Plot ==
Al Jackson has just moved into a magnificent penthouse apartment and would seem to have it all; fame, fortune, and a loyal retinue.

But his accountant has embezzled his fortune, and this brings on a nervous breakdown (as well as the loss of his voice). His doctor orders him to take a long vacation in the country and forget all about show business, which, for Jackson, is almost impossible.

But a meeting with pretty Ruth Haines and her 10-year-old niece proves therapeutic. Haines is an aspiring playwright, and Jackson decides to make his return to Broadway using her play. But he neglects to tell Haines of the "surprise", and she assumes he is trying to steal her play.

The lover's quarrel is patched up at opening night, and the play is a rousing success.

There are several elaborate musical numbers, the best remembered being "I Love To Sing-a" and "You're The Cure For What Ails Me".

== Cast ==
- Al Jolson as Al Jackson
- Sybil Jason as Sybil Haines
- Beverly Roberts as Ruth Haines
- Edward Everett Horton as Davenport Rogers
- Lyle Talbot as Robert 'Bob' Carey
- Allen Jenkins as Joe Eddy
- Claire Dodd as Dana Lawrence
- Frank Mitchell as Dope
- Wini Shaw as Blackface Singer
- Joe King as Dr. May
- William B. Davidson as Barney Hammond
- Cab Calloway as Cotton Club Band Leader
- Cab Calloway and His Cotton Club Orchestra as Cotton Club Orchestra
- Yacht Club Boys as Singing Quartette
