= Tenth Avenue Kid =

1938 film by Bernard Vorhaus

- Theatrical release poster
- Directed by: Bernard Vorhaus
- Screenplay by: Gordon Kahn
- Story by: Gordon Kahn; Adele Buffington
- Produced by: Harry Grey
- Starring: Bruce Cabot; Beverly Roberts; Ben Welden; Horace McMahon; John Wray; Jay Novello
- Cinematography: Ernest Miller
- Edited by: William Morgan
- Production company: Republic Pictures
- Distributed by: Republic Pictures
- Release date: August 22, 1938
- Running time: 66 minutes
- Country: United States
- Language: English

Tenth Avenue Kid is a 1938 American crime film directed by Bernard Vorhaus and written by Gordon Kahn and Adele Buffington. The film stars Bruce Cabot, Beverly Roberts, Ben Welden, Horace McMahon, John Wray and Jay Novello. The film was released on August 22, 1938, by Republic Pictures.

== Plot ==
Jim Loomis is a reporter after a big story about a heist, the kid Tommy Turner knows the identity of the gang, but Loomis has a hard time getting him to spill the beans.

== Cast ==
- Bruce Cabot as Jim 'Silk' Loomis
- Beverly Roberts as Susan Holland
- Ben Welden as Marty Dayton
- Horace McMahon as Max Hooker
- John Wray as Joe Turner
- Jay Novello as Hobart
- Charles C. Wilson as Commissioner
- Byron Foulger as Dr. Belknap
- Paul Bryar as Wheeler
- Walter Sande as Detective Faber
- Ralph Dunn as Detective Egan
- Julian Petruzzi as Jerry Simons
- Tommy Ryan as Tommy Turner
