= Miracle in the Rain (film) =

1956 film by Rudolph Maté

- Theatrical film poster
- Directed by: Rudolph Maté
- Written by: Ben Hecht
- Based on: Miracle in the Rain; 1943 novella by Ben Hecht
- Produced by: Frank P. Rosenberg
- Starring: Jane Wyman; Van Johnson
- Cinematography: Russell Metty
- Edited by: Thomas Reilly
- Music by: Franz Waxman
- Production company: Warner Bros.–First National Picture
- Distributed by: Warner Bros.
- Release date: March 31, 1956
- Running time: 108 minutes
- Country: United States
- Language: English
- Box office: $1.4 million (US/Canadian rentals)

Miracle in the Rain is a 1956 American romance film directed by Rudolph Maté based on the 1943 novella by Ben Hecht (who also wrote the adaptation screenplay). The film stars Jane Wyman and Van Johnson.

== Plot ==
In New York City, Ruth Wood works as a secretary for Excelsior Shoe Manufacturing Company, and lives with her elderly mother, Agnes. Ruth's co-workers are Grace Ullman and Millie Kranz, who is having an affair with her married boss, Stephen Jalonik. One evening after work, Arthur Hugenon, a G.I. stationed in the area, surprises Ruth by starting a conversation. On her bus ride back home, Arthur invites her to dinner but she declines, stating her mother is expecting her. Undeterred, Arthur buys food from a local delicatessen and accompanies Ruth home.

Agnes, who has distrusted men since her husband Harry left her ten years earlier, receives Arthur with little enthusiasm. After dinner, Arthur finds an unfinished melody Harry had composed, by a piano. He asks permission for he and Dixie, his war buddy, to write lyrics for it. Later, that weekend, Arthur accompanies Ruth and Grace for the evening. After passing by an auction, Ruth impulsively bids on an antique Roman coin, which she gives to Arthur for good luck. Afterwards, they attend a French restaurant, where Ruth is unaware that the piano player is her father, whom she has not seen since he left Agnes. However, Harry recognizes Ruth and confides to his bartender friend Andy that he is too ashamed to return to his family.

The next day, Arthur arrives late for their date, but brings the revised song entitled "I'll Always Believe in You", which he sings together with Ruth. As they walk around Central Park, Ruth voices fears about the war, but Arthur tells her she must have faith. They then encounter Sergeant Gil Parker, who asks Arthur to take pictures of him and his new singer bride, Arlene Witchy. Gil soon photographs Arthur and Ruth together. In private, Gil warns Arthur that his division are to be shipped overseas, but Arthur refuses to believe the rumor.

At the lagoon, where children are sailing toy boats, Arthur recognizes Commodore Ely B. Windgate, nicknamed "Windy", a former yachtsman. Hoping to be a reporter after the war, Arthur goes with Ruth to The New York Times Building and convinces the editor to let him write a human interest story, with Windgate as the subject. The story is published but instead of being paid, Arthur asks to be considered for a job after the war. Sometime later, Arthur informs Ruth he has been deployed overseas but vows to marry Ruth when he returns. He gives her a family heirloom ring to wear as a sign of his love and commitment to her while he is away at war. She puts it on and wears it. He soon leaves on a truck filled with other soldiers, and takes with him the Roman coin.

For three months, Ruth writes to Arthur but receives no letter in response. A mailman hands Ruth a letter informing her that Arthur had died in combat. Ruth falls into a depression, which causes Millie to leave Jalonik and the firm. Grace takes Ruth to St. Patrick's Cathedral, where Ruth continually returns to pray under the statue of Saint Andrew. There, she converses with the cathedral's young priest. Losing interest in life, Ruth's cold progresses into pneumonia. Mrs. Hamer, the upstairs neighbor who attends to Agnes, helps to nurse Ruth. One rainy night, Ruth leaves the apartment while Harry contemplates walking in to ask Agnes for forgiveness. Stunned at seeing him, Agnes also realizes that Ruth is missing, just as Grace telephones. After being told that Ruth has left, Grace realizes that she must be heading for the cathedral.

Standing on the cathedral steps, Ruth hears Arthur's voice calling her name. Delirious, she sees Arthur materialize and they embrace as he states their love will never die. He returns the Roman coin, and within a moment, the priest finds Ruth unconscious on the steps, just as Grace arrives. Grace recognizes the coin clasped in Ruth's hand, and realizes that Arthur had returned to Ruth, whose life remains clouded in uncertainty.

== Cast ==
- Jane Wyman as Ruth Wood
- Van Johnson as Arthur "Art" Hugenon
- Peggie Castle as Millie Kranz
- Fred Clark as Stephen Jalonik
- Eileen Heckart as Grace Ullman
- Josephine Hutchinson as Agnes Wood
- William Gargan as Harry Wood
- Marcel Dalio as Marcel
- George Givot as Maitre d' at Café Normandy
- Barbara Nichols as Arlene Witchy
- Halliwell Hobbes as Ely B. "Windy" Windgate
- Paul Picerni as Priest at St. Patrick's Cathedral
- Alan King as Sergeant Gilbert "Gil" Parker
- Irene Seidner as Mrs. Hamer
- Arte Johnson as Monty
- Grandon Rhodes as a city editor (uncredited)
- Paul Smith as Dixie Smith (uncredited)

== Marketing ==
Before the film's release, Warner Bros. held a contest, in which 32 female secretaries from each respective city were in the drawing for a three-day, all-expenses-paid competition titled "A Miracle Can Happen to You". On April 2, 1956, a U.S. soldier was selected to draw 25 winners from a drum. A week later, 25 secretaries were flown into Hollywood where they were greeted by Tab Hunter and Peggie Castle, the latter of whom acted in the film. They made a guest appearance on the CBS television program House Party, and were entertained at Frank Sennes' Moulin Rouge nightclub, where they viewed the musical revue Paris Toujours.

== Reception ==
A. H. Weiler of The New York Times wrote: "Although it has moments of insight, sensitivity and compassion, Miracle in the Rain falls short of its potential." He felt the film's subplots were not developed enough, but nevertheless credited "producer Frank P. Rosenberg and director Rudolph Maté for extracting several tender sequences from the principals and the supporting cast."

Harrison's Reports felt the film was "tender and moving in spots, but on the whole it is doubtful if the males, particularly the action fans, will find it to their liking, for it is a long drawn out conversation piece. Moreover, the story is filled with incidents and by-plots that have little or no bearing on the main theme, with the result that one's attention wanders from the screen. Jane Wyman and Van Johnson turn in sensitive performances in the leading roles".

William Brogdon of Variety was also critical of the script, writing it is "wordy and crammed with too much incident, permitting audience rapport with plot and principals to waver over the long course."
