= Horace McMahon =

American actor (1907–1971)

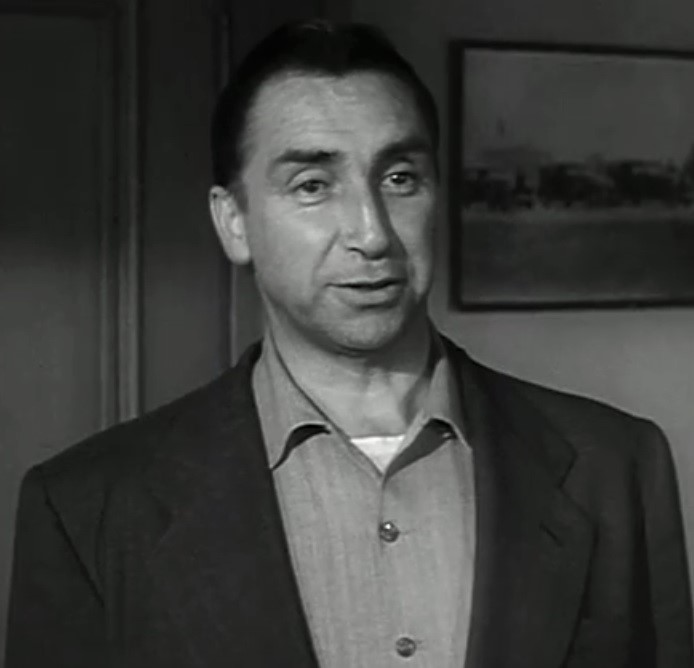
- McMahon in Detective Story (1951)
- Born: May 17, 1907; South Norwalk, Connecticut, U.S.
- Died: August 17, 1971 (aged 64); Norwalk, Connecticut, U.S.
- Education: Fordham University School of Law
- Occupation: Actor
- Years active: 1931–1969
- Spouse: Louise Campbell (m. 1937; died 1971)
- Children: 3

Horace McMahon (May 17, 1907 – August 17, 1971) was an American actor. He was one of Hollywood's favorite heavies.

McMahon began his acting career on Broadway, then appeared in many films and television series. In 1962, he received a Primetime Emmy Award nomination for his performance in the series Naked City (1958–1963).

== Early years ==
McMahon was born in South Norwalk, Connecticut. He became interested in acting when he was a student at Fordham University School of Law.

== Career ==
In his early career McMahon mostly played gangsters and criminals, but in 1949 he starred in his most acclaimed role as Lieutenant Monaghan in the drama Detective Story. In 1951 he reprised his character in Paramount Pictures' film version Detective Story with Kirk Douglas and Eleanor Parker.

McMahon also starred on television in the ABC police series Naked City as Lt. Mike Parker, a gruff but warmhearted police officer, interested only in justice and doing the job according to the proper rules of the game. He was nominated for an Emmy Award for this role.

In 1964, McMahon played Hank McClure, a police contact in the CBS drama series, Mr. Broadway.

On 5 October 1967, McMahon performed as "Glu Gluten" in Season 3, Episode 4's "The Sport of Penguins" on ABC's Batman television series.

In 1968, he played police Captain Tom Farrell in The Detective starring Frank Sinatra.

McMahon also did voice-overs for commercials, including those for Close-Up toothpaste and Armstrong tires.

== Legacy ==
In 1972, a 375-seat theater named in honor of McMahon was created in the McCrory Building on Washington Street in South Norwalk, Connecticut.

== Personal life ==
McMahon was married to actress Louise Campbell from 1938 until his death in 1971. Their daughter Martha McMahon also became an actress.

== Selected filmography ==
- Bulldog Edition (1936) – Horace Boyd (uncredited)
- Navy Blues (1937) – Gateleg
- They Gave Him a Gun (1937) – Prison Inmate (uncredited)
- Kid Galahad (1937) – Reporter at Press Conference (uncredited)
- Public Wedding (1937) – Reporter
- Exclusive (1937) – Beak McArdle
- Bad Guy (1937) – Malone the Informer (uncredited)
- The Wrong Road (1937) – Blackie Clayton
- A Girl with Ideas (1937) – Al
- The Last Gangster (1937) – Limpy (uncredited)
- Paid to Dance (1937) – LaRue
- When G-Men Step In (1938) – Jennings
- King of the Newsboys (1938) – Lockjaw
- Ladies in Distress (1938) – 2nd Thug
- Fast Company (1938) – Danny Scolado
- Marie Antoinette (1938) – Rabblerouser (uncredited)
- The Crowd Roars (1938) – Rocky Simpson (uncredited)
- Tenth Avenue Kid (1938) – Max Hooker
- I Am the Law (1938) – Prisoner (uncredited)
- Wanted by the Police (1938) – Russo's Chief Henchman
- Broadway Musketeers (1938) – Gurk, Vince's Henchman
- Secrets of a Nurse (1938) – Larry Carson
- Newsboys' Home (1938) – Bartsch
- Federal Man-Hunt (1938) – Snuffy Deegan
- Pride of the Navy (1939) – Gloomey Kelly
- Pirates of the Skies (1939) – Henchman Artie (uncredited)
- I Was a Convict (1939) – Missouri Smith
- Sergeant Madden (1939) – Philadelphia
- For Love or Money (1939) – Dead Eyes
- Calling Dr. Kildare (1939) – J. Harold 'Fog Horn' Murphy – Taxi Driver (uncredited)
- Big Town Czar (1939) – Punchy
- Rose of Washington Square (1939) – Irving
- The Gracie Allen Murder Case (1939) – Gus (uncredited)
- 6,000 Enemies (1939) – Prisoner Boxcar (uncredited)
- Bachelor Mother (1939) – Dance Floor Official (uncredited)
- She Married a Cop (1939) – Joe Nash
- Quick Millions (1939) – Floyd 'Bat' Douglas
- Sabotage (1939) – Art Kruger
- Another Thin Man (1939) – MacFay's Chauffeur (uncredited)
- That's Right—You're Wrong (1939) – Hood (uncredited)
- Laugh It Off (1939) – Phil Ferrranti
- Oh Johnny, How You Can Love (1940) – 'Lefty' Hodges – Bank Robber
- The Marines Fly High (1940) – Sgt. Monk O'Hara
- The Ghost Comes Home (1940) – Dave – the Nightclub Manager (uncredited)
- Dr. Kildare's Strange Case (1940) – J. Harold 'Fog Horn' Murphy
- My Favorite Wife (1940) – Truck Driver Giving Lift to Ellen (uncredited)
- Gangs of Chicago (1940) – Cry-Baby
- I Can't Give You Anything But Love, Baby (1940) – Bugs
- Millionaires in Prison (1940) – Sylvester Odgen 'SOS' Schofield
- We Who Are Young (1940) – Foreman
- The Golden Fleecing (1940) – Process Server (uncredited)
- Dr. Kildare Goes Home (1940) – J. Harold 'Fog Horn' Murphy (uncredited)
- The Leather Pushers (1940) – Slugger Mears
- The Bride Wore Crutches (1940) – Brains
- Margie (1940) – Detective
- Melody Ranch (1940) – Bud Wildhack
- Dr. Kildare's Crisis (1940) – J. Harold 'Fog Horn' Murphy
- Come Live with Me (1941) – Taxi Driver
- Rookies on Parade (1941) – Tiger Brannigan
- Lady Scarface (1941) – Mullen
- Dr. Kildare's Wedding Day (1941) – J. Harold 'Fog Horn' Murphy (uncredited)
- Buy Me That Town (1941) – Fingers Flint
- The Stork Pays Off (1941) – 'Ears-to-the-Ground' Hinkle
- Birth of the Blues (1941) – Wolf
- Jail House Blues (1942) – Swifty
- Stage Door Canteen (1943) – Himself
- Good Luck, Mr. Yates (1943) – Truck Driver (uncredited)
- Dangerous Blondes (1943) – Hoodlum (uncredited)
- Timber Queen (1944) – Rodney
- The Navy Way (1944) – Sailor Saxon (uncredited)
- Roger Touhy, Gangster (1944) – Maxie Sharkey (uncredited)
- 13 Rue Madeleine (1946) – Burglary Instructor (scenes deleted)
- Joe Palooka in Fighting Mad (1948) – Looie
- Smart Woman (1948) – Lefty (uncredited)
- Waterfront at Midnight (1948) – Hank Bremmer
- The Return of October (1948) – Big Louie (uncredited)
- Detective Story (1951) – Lt. Monaghan
- Abbott and Costello Go to Mars (1953) – Mugsy
- Man in the Dark (1953) – Arnie
- Fast Company (1953) – 'Two Pair' Buford
- Champ for a Day (1953) – Sam Benton
- Duffy of San Quentin (1954) – Pierson
- Susan Slept Here (1954) – Sergeant Monty Maizel
- Blackboard Jungle (1955) – Detective
- My Sister Eileen (1955) – Police Officer Lonigan
- Texas Lady (1955) – Stringer Winfield
- The Delicate Delinquent (1957) – Police Captain Riley
- Beau James (1957) – Prosecutor
- Never Steal Anything Small (1959) – O. K. Merritt
- The Swinger (1966) – Detective Sergeant Hooker
- The Detective (1968) – Farrell
