= Little Big Shot (1935 film) =

1935 film by Michael Curtiz

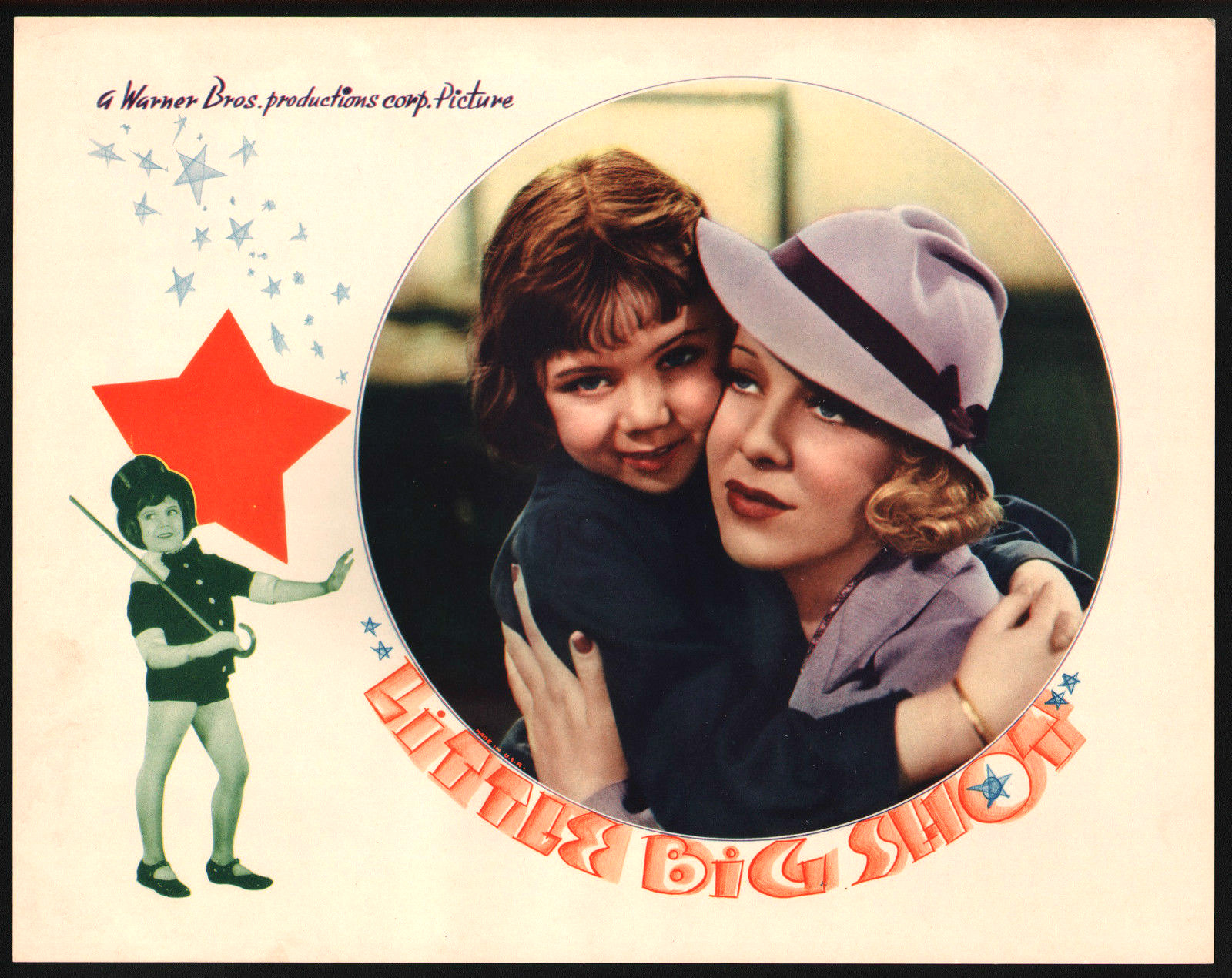
- Lobby card
- Directed by: Michael Curtiz
- Written by: Jerry Wald; Julius J. Epstein; Robert Hardy Andrews
- Produced by: Samuel Bischoff
- Starring: Sybil Jason; Glenda Farrell
- Cinematography: Tony Gaudio
- Edited by: Jack Killifer
- Music by: Heinz Roemheld; Frank Dixon; Allie Wrubel
- Distributed by: Warner Bros. Pictures
- Release date: September 7, 1935
- Running time: 78 minutes
- Country: United States
- Language: English

Little Big Shot is a 1935 American comedy film directed by Michael Curtiz, and starring Sybil Jason and Glenda Farrell. The film was released by Warner Bros. Pictures on September 7, 1935. The plot concerns a young girl who endears herself to her caretakers after her father is murdered by mobsters.

== Plot ==
Mortimer Thompson and Steve Craig are a pair of sidewalk confidence men working Broadway one step ahead of the police selling phony watches. Broke, they arrange to have dinner with Gibbs, an old friend, thinking that he will help them with some money. However, Gibbs is broke as well and thinks that Steve and Mortimer can help him. Gibbs and his young daughter Gloria are hiding from notorious gangster Kell Norton. After Steve, Mortimer, Gibbs and Gloria finish their dinner, Gibbs is shot and killed by Norton's men as the group leaves the restaurant. Steve and Mortimer flee, hastily leaving Gloria behind. Despite Mortimer's protestations, Steve convinces him to go back for the girl.

Gloria stays with Steve and Mortimer for a night and takes Mortimer's bed, forcing Mortimer to sleep in the bathroom. Steve tries to deposit Gloria in an orphanage but is overcome with guilt when she begins to cry. Steve and Mortimer try to care for Gloria with the help of Jean, a hat-check girl at their residential hotel. Steve and Mortimer discover that Gloria can sing and dance, so they have her perform on the street with them. Gloria also helps them sell their fake watches although Jean disapproves.

Jean places Gloria in an orphanage because Steve and Mortimer are not responsible enough to take care of her. Steve wins a craps game with small-time hoodlum Jack Doré to raise money, but Doré refuses to pay and Steve threatens revenge. Later, Norton kills Doré and passes Steve, who is arriving to demand Doré for his winnings so that he can adopt Gloria. Steve becomes the suspect for the crime. Norton realizes that Steve is a witness against him and tries to locate and silence him. To force Steve out of hiding, Norton kidnaps Gloria. Steve convinces the gangsters to release Gloria and take him instead. Just as Norton's gang is about to kill Steve, the police (informed by Mortimer and Jean) arrive at the hideout. His name cleared, Steve marries Jean and they adopt Gloria. Steve, Jean, Gloria and Mortimer move away from the city and open a roadside café.

== Cast ==
- Sybil Jason as Gloria "Countess" Gibbs
- Glenda Farrell as Jean
- Robert Armstrong as Steve Craig
- Edward Everett Horton as Mortimer Thompson
- Jack La Rue as Jack Doré
- Arthur Vinton as Kell "Nort" Norton
- J. Carrol Naish as Bert
- Edgar Kennedy as Onderdonk
- Addison Richards as Hank Gibbs

== Production ==
Warner Bros. hired five-year-old South African Sybil Jason to compete with Twentieth Century-Fox's Shirley Temple, and Little Big Shot marked Jason's American screen debut. In the film, Jason performs imitations of Greta Garbo, Mae West and Jimmy Durante.

Byron Haskins finished the photography on the film, but only Tony Gaudio received screen credit.

== Songs ==
The film's soundtrack includes songs written by Frank Dixon and Allie Wrubel:

- "I'm a Little Big Shot Now"
- "Rolling in the Money"
- "My Kid's a Crooner"

== Reception ==
In a contemporary review for The New York Times, critic Andre Sennwald wrote: "Convinced that Hollywood is suffering from a drought rather than a plague of baby Bernhardts, Warner Brothers have imported a new one, Miss Sybil Jason, from South Africa. She performs all the triple-threat functions in 'Little Big Shot', including a couple of impersonations and a song and dance. An engaging infant, she suffers just now from a studied quality that may be the result of overdirection. In some of her big emotional close-ups, the bewildered little girl seems to be making a valiant effort to take advice from half a dozen assistant directors all at once. Then, too, there is the additional difficulty that her British accent makes many of her lines unintelligible."

Variety commented that the film was "reminiscent" of Shirley Temple's Little Miss Marker and should pave the way for Sybil Jason's future in films. Describing Jason as "not as comely and cute" as Temple, they wrote that she can "act, emote, sing and dance" and "may prove of equally sturdy durability."

In their December, 1935 edition, Modern Screen gave the film a two-star review and described the plot as being outdated. The reviewer commented, "Dished up from a formula that’s almost as old as the Hollywood hills, this little number emerges as a combination tough-guy tear-jerker which really belongs back in the gangster cycle of several years ago, although it has its entertaining moments."
