= Sybil Jason =

American actress (1927–2011)

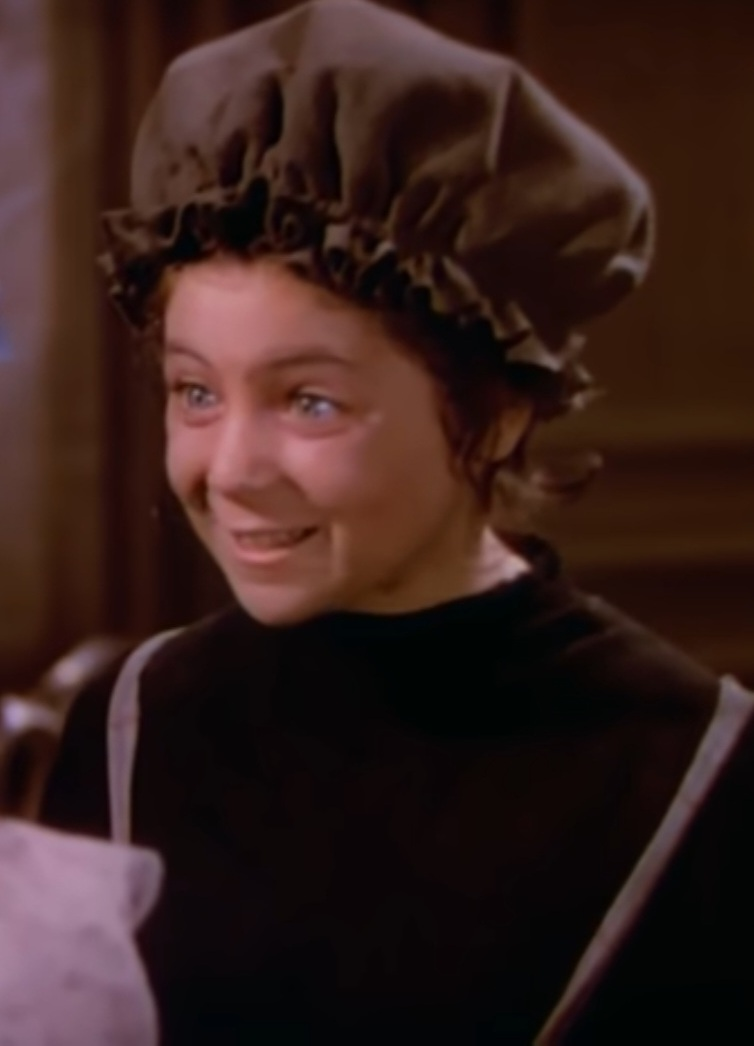
- Jason in The Little Princess (1939)
- Born: Sybil Jacobson; 23 November 1927; Cape Town, South Africa
- Died: 23 August 2011 (aged 83); Northridge, California, U.S.
- Resting place: Forest Lawn Memorial Park, Hollywood Hills
- Occupations: Actress, singer
- Years active: 1931–1940
- Spouse: Anthony Drake (m. 1947; died 2005)

Sybil Jason (born Sybil Jacobson; 23 November 1927 – 23 August 2011) was an American child film actress who, in the late 1930s, was presented as a rival to Shirley Temple.

== Career ==
Born in Cape Town, South Africa, on 23 November 1927, Sybil Jason began playing the piano at age two and, a year later, began making public appearances doing impersonations of Maurice Chevalier. She was introduced to the theatre-going public of London by way of her uncle, Harry Jacobson, a then-popular London orchestra leader and also pianist for Gracie Fields. The apex of her career came with a concert performance with Frances Day at London's Palace Theatre. Her theatre work led to appearances on radio and phonograph records as well as a supporting role in the film Barnacle Bill (1935).

Irving Asher, the head of Warner Bros.' London studio, saw Jason's performance in Barnacle Bill and arranged for her to make a screen test for the studio. The test was a success, resulting in Warner Bros. signing her to a contract. Her American film debut came as the lead in Little Big Shot (1935), directed by Michael Curtiz and co-starring Glenda Farrell, Robert Armstrong, and Edward Everett Horton.

Jason followed this with supporting roles opposite some of Warner Bros. most popular stars, including Kay Francis in I Found Stella Parish (1935), Al Jolson in The Singing Kid (1936), Pat O'Brien and Humphrey Bogart in The Great O'Malley (1937), and again with Kay Francis in Comet Over Broadway (1938). Warners also starred her in The Captain's Kid (1937), and four Vitaphone two-reelers filmed in Technicolor: Changing of the Guard, A Day at Santa Anita, Little Pioneer, and The Littlest Diplomat.

Jason never became the major rival to Shirley Temple that Warner Bros. had hoped, and her film career ended after playing two supporting roles at 20th-Century Fox. These films — The Little Princess (1939) and The Blue Bird (1940) — supported Temple, who became her lifelong friend.

== Personal life ==
Jason married Anthony Albert Fromlak (aka Anthony Drake) on 30 December 1950. He died in 2005. Their daughter, Toni Maryanna Rossi, is married to Phillip W. Rossi, producer of The New Price Is Right.

She became a naturalized United States citizen in 1952.

== Death ==
Sybil Jason died in 2011 and was buried at the Forest Lawn Memorial Park, Hollywood Hills.

== Legacy ==
- Sybil Jason was an active member in the International Al Jolson Society and made frequent appearances at celebrity shows throughout the United States.
- Her autobiography My Fifteen Minutes: An Autobiography of a Child Star of the Golden Era of Hollywood was published in 2004. She also wrote a stage musical, Garage Sale.

== Filmography ==
Year	Title	Role	Notes
1934	He Was Her Man	Little Girl	Uncredited
1935	Barnacle Bill	Jill as a child	
1935	Dance Band	Girl on train	
1935	Broadway Gondolier		(scenes deleted)
1935	Little Big Shot	Gloria "Countess" Gibbs	
1935	A Dream Comes True	Herself	Uncredited
1935	I Found Stella Parish	Gloria Parish	
1936	The Singing Kid	Sybil Haines	
1936	Changing of the Guard	Sybil	Short
1936	The Captain's Kid	Abigail Prentiss	
1937	The Great O'Malley	Barbara "Babs" Phillips	
1937	A Day at Santa Anita	Peaches Blackburn	Short
1937	Little Pioneer	Betsy Manning	Short
1937	The Littlest Diplomat	Sybil Hardwick	Short
1938	Comet Over Broadway	Jacqueline "Jackie" Appleton	
1939	Woman Doctor	Elsa Graeme	
1939	The Little Princess	Becky	
1940	The Blue Bird	Angela Berlingot	(final film role)

== Bibliography ==
- Jason, Sybil (2004). My Fifteen Minutes: An autobiography of a child star of the Golden Age of Hollywood. BearManor Media. ISBN 978-1-59393-023-3.
- Jason, Sybil (2007). 5 Minutes More. BearManor Media. ISBN 978-1-59393-115-5.
- Jason, Sybil (2013). What's It All About, Sybil?. BearManor Media. ISBN 978-1-59393-540-5.
