= List of American films of 1938 =

American films released in 1938

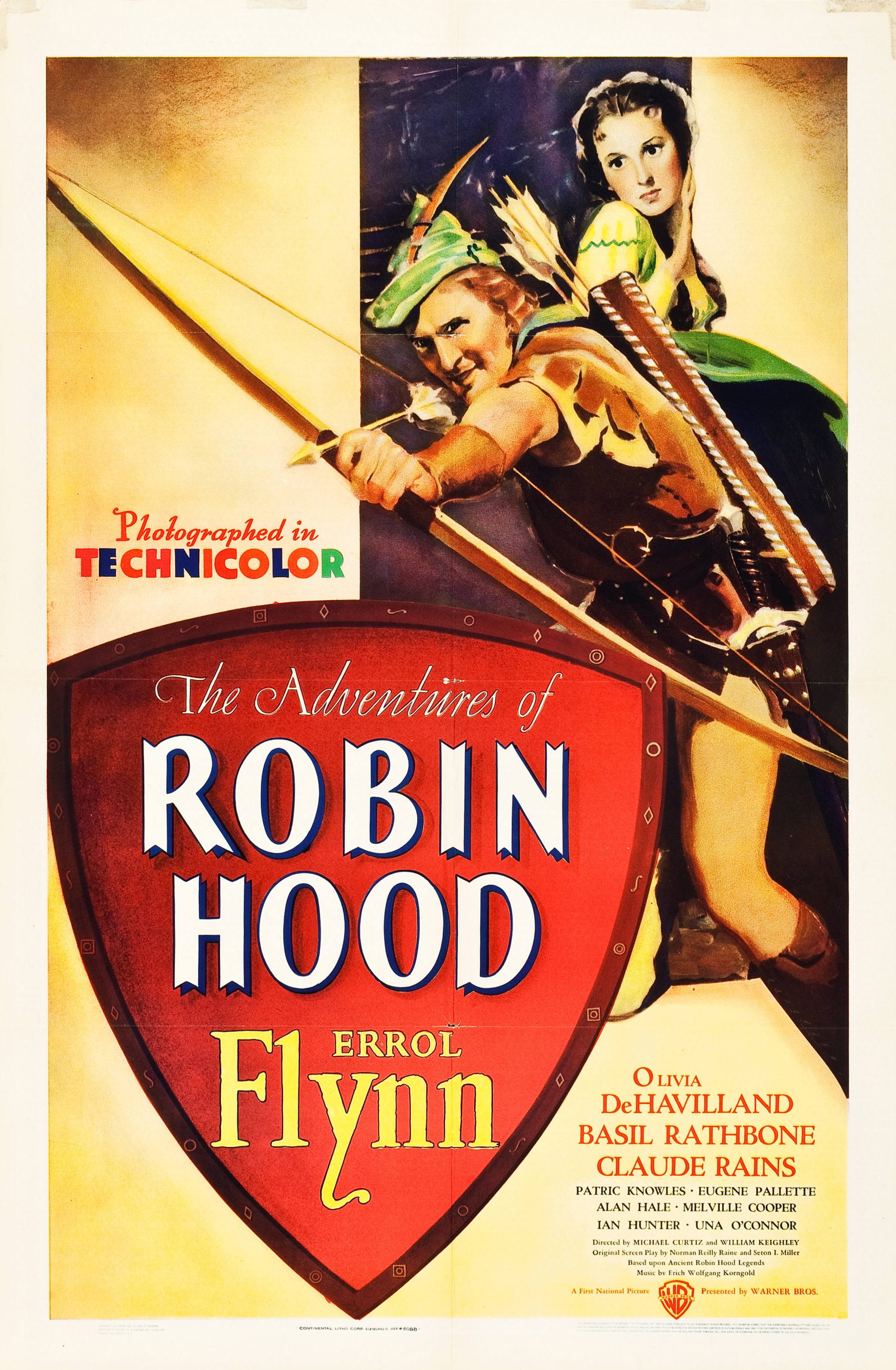
The Adventures of Robin Hood starring Erroll Flynn.

More than 455 American feature films were released in 1938.

The comedy You Can't Take It with You won the Academy Award for Best Picture.

== A–B ==
Title	Director	Cast	Genre	Notes
Accidents Will Happen	William Clemens	Ronald Reagan, Gloria Blondell, Dick Purcell	Drama	Warner Bros.
Adventure in Sahara	D. Ross Lederman	Paul Kelly, Lorna Gray, C. Henry Gordon	Adventure	Columbia
The Adventures of Marco Polo	Archie Mayo	Gary Cooper, Sigrid Gurie, Basil Rathbone	Historical	United Artists
The Adventures of Robin Hood	Michael Curtiz	Errol Flynn, Olivia de Havilland, Claude Rains	Adventure	Warner Bros.
The Adventures of Tom Sawyer	Norman Taurog	Tommy Kelly, Jackie Moran, Victor Jory	Adventure	United Artists
The Affairs of Annabel	Benjamin Stoloff	Lucille Ball, Jack Oakie, Bradley Page	Comedy	RKO
Air Devils	John Rawlins	Dick Purcell, Larry J. Blake, Beryl Wallace	Action	Universal
Alexander's Ragtime Band	Henry King	Don Ameche, Tyrone Power, Ethel Merman	Musical comedy	20th Century Fox
Algiers	John Cromwell	Hedy Lamarr, Charles Boyer, Joseph Calleia	Mystery	United Artists
Always Goodbye	Sidney Lanfield	Barbara Stanwyck, Herbert Marshall, Cesar Romero	Drama	20th Century Fox
Always in Trouble	Joseph Santley	Jane Withers, Nana Bryant, Eddie Collins	Comedy	20th Century Fox
The Amazing Dr. Clitterhouse	Anatole Litvak	Edward G. Robinson, Humphrey Bogart, Donald Crisp	Crime	Warner Bros.
Angels with Dirty Faces	Michael Curtiz	James Cagney, Pat O'Brien, Humphrey Bogart	Crime drama	Warner Bros.
Annabel Takes a Tour	Lew Landers	Lucille Ball, Jack Oakie, Ruth Donnelly	Comedy	RKO
The Arkansas Traveler	Alfred Santell	Bob Burns, Jean Parker, John Beal	Comedy	Paramount
Army Girl	George Nicholls Jr.	Preston Foster, Madge Evans, James Gleason	Comedy drama	Republic
Arrest Bulldog Drummond	James P. Hogan	John Howard, Heather Angel, Reginald Denny	Thriller	Paramount
Arsène Lupin Returns	George Fitzmaurice	Melvyn Douglas, Virginia Bruce, Warren William	Mystery	MGM
Arson Gang Busters	Joseph Kane	Robert Livingston, Jackie Moran, Rosalind Keith	Action	Republic
Artists and Models Abroad	Mitchell Leisen	Jack Benny, Joan Bennett, Mary Boland	Comedy, Musical	Paramount
Bar 20 Justice	Lesley Selander	William Boyd, Gabby Hayes, Russell Hayden	Western	Paramount
Barefoot Boy	Karl Brown	Jackie Moran, Ralph Morgan, Claire Windsor	Drama	Monogram
The Baroness and the Butler	Walter Lang	William Powell, Annabella, Henry Stephenson	Comedy	20th Century Fox
Battle of Broadway	George Marshall	Victor McLaglen, Brian Donlevy, Gypsy Rose Lee	Comedy	20th Century Fox
The Beloved Brat	Arthur Lubin	Bonita Granville, Donald Crisp, Dolores Costello	Comedy	Warner Bros.
The Big Broadcast of 1938	Mitchell Leisen	W. C. Fields, Bob Hope, Dorothy Lamour	Musical comedy	Paramount
Billy the Kid Returns	Joseph Kane	Roy Rogers, Lynne Roberts, Smiley Burnette	Western	Republic
Black Bandit	George Waggner	Bob Baker, Marjorie Reynolds, Jack Rockwell	Western	Universal
The Black Doll	Otis Garrett	C. Henry Gordon, Nan Grey, Donald Woods	Mystery	Universal
Blind Alibi	Lew Landers	Richard Dix, Whitney Bourne, Eduardo Ciannelli	Drama	RKO
Blockade	William Dieterle	Madeleine Carroll, Henry Fonda, Leo Carrillo	War drama	United Artists
Block-Heads	John G. Blystone	Stan Laurel, Oliver Hardy, Patricia Ellis	Comedy	MGM
Blond Cheat	Joseph Santley	Joan Fontaine, Derrick De Marney, Lilian Bond	Comedy	RKO
Blondes at Work	Frank McDonald	Glenda Farrell, Barton MacLane, Tom Kennedy	Mystery	Warner Bros.
Blondie	Frank R. Strayer	Arthur Lake, Penny Singleton, Jonathan Hale	Comedy	Columbia
Bluebeard's Eighth Wife	Ernst Lubitsch	Claudette Colbert, Gary Cooper, David Niven	Comedy	Paramount
Booloo	Clyde E. Elliott	Colin Tapley, Jayne Regan, Ratna Asmara	Adventure	Paramount
Border G-Man	David Howard	George O'Brien, Laraine Day, Rita La Roy	Adventure	RKO
Border Wolves	Joseph H. Lewis	Bob Baker, Constance Moore, Fuzzy Knight	Western	Universal
Born to be Wild	Joseph Kane	Ralph Byrd, Doris Weston, Ward Bond	Action	Republic
Boy Meets Girl	Lloyd Bacon	James Cagney, Pat O'Brien, Marie Wilson	Comedy	Warner Bros.
Boys Town	Norman Taurog	Spencer Tracy, Mickey Rooney, Henry Hull	Drama	MGM
Breaking the Ice	Edward F. Cline	Charles Ruggles, Dolores Costello, John King	Drama	RKO
Bringing Up Baby	Howard Hawks	Katharine Hepburn, Cary Grant, May Robson	Comedy	RKO
Broadway Musketeers	John Farrow	Margaret Lindsay, Ann Sheridan, Marie Wilson	Musical	Warner Bros.
Brother Rat	William Keighley	Wayne Morris, Ronald Reagan, Jane Wyman	Comedy	Warner Bros.
The Buccaneer	Cecil B. DeMille	Fredric March, Hugh Sothern, Margot Grahame	Adventure	Paramount
Bulldog Drummond in Africa	Louis King	John Howard, Heather Angel, H. B. Warner	Thriller	Paramount
Bulldog Drummond's Peril	James P. Hogan	John Howard, John Barrymore, Louise Campbell	Thriller	Paramount

== C–D ==
Title	Director	Cast	Genre	Notes
California Frontier	Elmer Clifton	Buck Jones, Milburn Stone, Stanley Blystone	Western	Columbia
Call of the Rockies	Alan James	Charles Starrett, Iris Meredith, Dick Curtis	Western	Columbia
Call of the Yukon	B. Reeves Eason	Richard Arlen, Beverly Roberts, Lyle Talbot	Adventure	Republic
Call the Mesquiteers	John English	Robert Livingston, Ray Corrigan, Lynne Roberts	Western	Republic
Campus Confessions	George Archainbaud	Betty Grable, Thurston Hall, William Henry	Comedy	Paramount
Carefree	Mark Sandrich	Fred Astaire, Ginger Rogers, Jack Carson	Musical comedy	RKO
Cassidy of Bar 20	Lesley Selander	William Boyd, Russell Hayden, Nora Lane	Western	Paramount
Cattle Raiders	Sam Nelson	Charles Starrett, Iris Meredith, Dick Curtis	Western	Universal
Change of Heart	James Tinling	Gloria Stuart, Michael Whalen, Lyle Talbot	Comedy	20th Century Fox
Charlie Chan in Honolulu	H. Bruce Humberstone	Sidney Toler, Phyllis Brooks, Victor Sen Yung	Mystery	20th Century Fox
The Chaser	Edwin L. Marin	Lewis Stone, Nat Pendleton, John Qualen	Drama	MGM
Child Bride	Harry Revier	Shirley Mills, Warner Richmond, Angelo Rossitto	Exploitation	Independent
A Christmas Carol	Edwin L. Marin	Reginald Owen, Gene Lockhart, Barry MacKay	Fantasy drama	MGM
Cipher Bureau	Charles Lamont	Leon Ames, Charlotte Wynters, Joan Woodbury	Action	Grand National
City Girl	Alfred L. Werker	Phyllis Brooks, Ricardo Cortez, Robert Wilcox	Crime	20th Century Fox
City Streets	Albert S. Rogell	Leo Carrillo, Edith Fellows, Tommy Bond	Drama	Columbia
Cocoanut Grove	Alfred Santell	Fred MacMurray, Eve Arden, Rufe Davis	Musical comedy	Paramount
Code of the Rangers	Sam Newfield	Tim McCoy, Rex Lease, Wheeler Oakman	Western	Monogram
College Swing	Raoul Walsh	George Burns, Gracie Allen, Bob Hope	Comedy	Paramount
The Colorado Trail	Sam Nelson	Charles Starrett, Iris Meredith, Edward LeSaint	Western	Columbia
Come On, Leathernecks!	James Cruze	Richard Cromwell, Marsha Hunt, Edward Brophy	Action	Republic
Come On, Rangers	Joseph Kane	Roy Rogers, Lynne Roberts, Raymond Hatton	Western	Republic
Comet over Broadway	Busby Berkeley	Kay Francis, Donald Crisp, Ian Hunter	Drama	Warner Bros.
Condemned Women	Lew Landers	Anne Shirley, Sally Eilers, Lee Patrick	Drama	RKO
Convicted	Leon Barsha	Charles Quigley, Rita Hayworth, Marc Lawrence	Action	Columbia
Convicts at Large	Scott R. Beal	Ralph Forbes, Paula Stone, John Kelly	Crime	Independent
The Cowboy and the Lady	H. C. Potter	Gary Cooper, Merle Oberon, Walter Brennan	Western comedy	United Artists
Cowboy from Brooklyn	Lloyd Bacon	Pat O'Brien, Dick Powell, Priscilla Lane	Musical comedy	Warner Bros.
Crashing Through Danger	Sam Newfield	Ray Walker, Sally Blane, Guinn "Big Boy" Williams	Drama	Independent
Crashing Hollywood	Lew Landers	Lee Tracy, Joan Woodbury, Lee Patrick	Comedy	RKO
The Crime of Doctor Hallet	S. Sylvan Simon	Ralph Bellamy, Josephine Hutchinson, Barbara Read	Drama	Universal
Crime Ring	Leslie Goodwins	Allan Lane, Clara Blandick, Bradley Page	Drama	RKO
Crime School	Lewis Seiler	Humphrey Bogart, Gale Page, Billy Halop	Drama	Warner Bros.
Crime Takes a Holiday	Lewis D. Collins	Jack Holt, Marcia Ralston, Russell Hopton	Crime	Columbia
The Crowd Roars	Richard Thorpe	Robert Taylor, Maureen O'Sullivan, Edward Arnold	Action	MGM
Danger on the Air	Otis Garrett	Donald Woods, Nan Grey, Jed Prouty	Mystery	Universal
Dangerous to Know	Robert Florey	Anna May Wong, Akim Tamiroff, Gail Patrick	Crime	Paramount
Daredevil Drivers	B. Reeves Eason	Beverly Roberts, Dick Purcell, Gloria Blondell	Crime	Warner Bros.
The Dawn Patrol	Edmund Goulding	Errol Flynn, Basil Rathbone, David Niven	War	Warner Bros.
Delinquent Parents	Nick Grinde	Doris Weston, Maurice Murphy, Helen MacKellar	Drama	Independent
Desert Patrol	Sam Newfield	Bob Steele, Rex Lease, Ted Adams	Western	Republic
A Desperate Adventure	John H. Auer	Ramon Novarro, Marian Marsh, Eric Blore	Comedy	Republic
The Devil's Party	Ray McCarey	Victor McLaglen, Beatrice Roberts, William Gargan	Crime	Universal
Doctor Rhythm	Frank Tuttle	Bing Crosby, Mary Carlisle, Andy Devine	Musical comedy	Paramount
Double Danger	Lew Landers	Preston Foster, Whitney Bourne, Donald Meek	Crime	RKO
Down in 'Arkansaw'	Nick Grinde	Ralph Byrd, June Storey, Berton Churchill	Comedy	Republic
Down on the Farm	Malcolm St. Clair	Jed Prouty, Spring Byington, Louise Fazenda	Comedy	20th Century Fox
Dramatic School	Robert B. Sinclair	Luise Rainer, Paulette Goddard, Lana Turner	Drama	MGM
The Duke of West Point	Alfred E. Green	Joan Fontaine, Tom Brown, Richard Carlson	Drama	United Artists
Durango Valley Raiders	Sam Newfield	Bob Steele, Louise Stanley, Karl Hackett	Western	Republic

== E–F ==
Title	Director	Cast	Genre	Notes
Everybody Sing	Edwin L. Marin	Judy Garland, Fanny Brice, Billie Burke	Musical comedy	MGM
Everybody's Doing It	Christy Cabanne	Sally Eilers, Preston Foster, Guinn Williams	Romantic comedy	RKO
Exposed	Harold D. Schuster	Glenda Farrell, Otto Kruger, Herbert Mundin	Drama	Universal
Extortion	Lambert Hillyer	Scott Kolk, Mary Russell, Thurston Hall	Mystery	Columbia
Fast Company	Edward Buzzell	Melvyn Douglas, Florence Rice, Claire Dodd	Comedy	MGM
Federal Man-Hunt	Nick Grinde	Robert Livingston, June Travis, John Gallaudet	Crime	Republic
Female Fugitive	William Nigh	Evelyn Venable, Craig Reynolds, Reed Hadley	Drama	Monogram
The Feud Maker	Sam Newfield	Bob Steele, Karl Hackett, Budd Buster	Western	Republic
The First Hundred Years	Richard Thorpe	Robert Montgomery, Virginia Bruce, Warren William	Comedy	MGM
Five of a Kind	Herbert I. Leeds	Jean Hersholt, Claire Trevor, Cesar Romero	Comedy	20th Century Fox
Flight Into Nowhere	Lewis D. Collins	Jack Holt, Jacqueline Wells, Dick Purcell	Adventure	Columbia
Flight to Fame	Charles C. Coleman	Charles Farrell, Hugh Sothern, Julie Bishop	Science fiction	Columbia
Flirting with Fate	Frank McDonald	Joe E. Brown, Beverly Roberts, Wynne Gibson	Comedy	MGM
Fools for Scandal	Mervyn LeRoy	Carole Lombard, Ralph Bellamy, Fernand Gravey	Musical comedy	Warner Bros.
Forbidden Valley	Wyndham Gittens	Noah Beery Jr., Robert Barrat, Samuel S. Hinds	Western	Universal
Four Daughters	Michael Curtiz	Priscilla Lane, Claude Rains, John Garfield	Drama	Warner Bros.
Four Men and a Prayer	John Ford	Loretta Young, David Niven, George Sanders	Drama	20th Century Fox
Four's a Crowd	Michael Curtiz	Errol Flynn, Olivia de Havilland, Rosalind Russell	Comedy	Warner Bros.
Freshman Year	Frank McDonald	Constance Moore, Dixie Dunbar, William Lundigan	Musical	Universal
Frontier Scout	Sam Newfield	George Houston, Beth Marion, Al St. John	Western	Grand National
Frontier Town	Ray Taylor	Tex Ritter, Ann Evers, Karl Hackett	Western	Grand National
The Frontiersmen	Lesley Selander	William Boyd, Gabby Hayes, Evelyn Venable	Western	Paramount
Fugitives for a Night	Leslie Goodwins	Eleanor Lynn, Allan Lane, Bradley Page	Mystery	RKO

== G–H ==
Title	Director	Cast	Genre	Notes
Gambling Ship	Aubrey Scotto	Robert Wilcox, Helen Mack, Edward Brophy	Mystery	Universal
Gang Bullets	Lambert Hillyer	Anne Nagel, Robert Kent, Morgan Wallace	Crime	Monogram
Gang Smashers	Leo C. Popkin	Nina Mae McKinney, Mantan Moreland, Laurence Criner	Comedy drama	Independent
Gangs of New York	James Cruze	Charles Bickford, Ann Dvorak, Wynne Gibson	Crime	Republic
Gangster's Boy	William Nigh	Jackie Cooper, Louise Lorimer, Tommy Wonder	Comedy drama	Monogram
Garden of the Moon	Busby Berkeley	Pat O'Brien, Rudy Vallée, Johnnie Davis	Musical comedy	Warner Bros.
Gateway	Alfred L. Werker	Arleen Whelan, Don Ameche, Gregory Ratoff	Drama	20th Century Fox
Ghost Town Riders	George Waggner	Bob Baker, Fay McKenzie, George Cleveland	Western	Universal
The Girl Downstairs	Norman Taurog	Franciska Gaal, Franchot Tone, Walter Connolly	Comedy	MGM
The Girl of the Golden West	Robert Z. Leonard	Jeanette MacDonald, Nelson Eddy, Walter Pidgeon	Musical	MGM
Girls on Probation	William C. McGann	Jane Bryan, Ronald Reagan, Susan Heyward	Drama	Warner Bros.
Girls' School	John Brahm	Anne Shirley, Nan Grey, Ralph Bellamy	Comedy	Columbia
Give Me a Sailor	Elliott Nugent	Martha Raye, Bob Hope, Betty Grable	Musical comedy	Paramount
The Gladiator	Edward Sedgwick	Joe E. Brown, June Travis, Dickie Moore	Comedy	Columbia
Go Chase Yourself	Edward F. Cline	Lucille Ball, Joe Penner, Fritz Feld	Comedy	RKO
God's Step Children	Oscar Micheaux	Ethel Moses, Alice B. Russell, Dorothy Van Engle	Drama	Independent
Going Places	Ray Enright	Dick Powell, Anita Louise, Ronald Reagan	Musical comedy	Warner Bros.
Gold Diggers in Paris	George Barnes, Ray Enright	Rudy Vallée, Rosemary Lane, Hugh Herbert	Musical comedy	Warner Bros.
Gold Is Where You Find It	Michael Curtiz	George Brent, Olivia de Havilland, Claude Rains	Western romance	Warner Bros.
Gold Mine in the Sky	Joseph Kane	Gene Autry, Carol Hughes, Smiley Burnette	Western	Republic
The Goldwyn Follies	H. C. Potter, George Marshall	Adolphe Menjou, Ritz Brothers, Vera Zorina	Musical	United Artists
Goodbye Broadway	Ray McCarey	Alice Brady, Charles Winninger, Dorothea Kent	Comedy	Universal
The Great Waltz	Josef von Sternberg, Julien Duvivier	Luise Rainer, Fernand Gravey, Lionel Atwill	Musical drama	MGM
Guilty Trails	George Waggner	Bob Baker, Marjorie Reynolds, Jack Rockwell	Western	Universal
Gun Law	David Howard	George O'Brien, Ward Bond, Robert Gleckler	Western	RKO
Gun Packer	Wallace Fox	Jack Randall, Louise Stanley, Charles King	Western	Monogram
Gunsmoke Trail	Sam Newfield	Jack Randall, Louise Stanley, Al St. John	Western	Monogram
Happy Landing	Roy Del Ruth	Sonja Henie, Don Ameche, Cesar Romero	Comedy	20th Century Fox
Hard to Get	Ray Enright	Olivia de Havilland, Dick Powell, Charles Winninger	Comedy	Warner Bros.
Having Wonderful Time	Alfred Santell	Ginger Rogers, Douglas Fairbanks Jr., Eve Arden	Romantic comedy	RKO
Hawaiian Buckaroo	Ray Taylor	Smith Ballew, Evalyn Knapp, Harry Woods	Western	20th Century Fox
Hawaii Calls	Edward F. Cline	Ned Sparks, Bobby Breen, Warren Hull	Musical	RKO
The Headleys at Home	Chris Beute	Evelyn Venable, Grant Mitchell, Vince Barnett	Comedy	Independent
Heart of Arizona	Lesley Selander	William Boyd, Russell Hayden, Natalie Moorhead	Western	Paramount
Heart of the North	Lewis Seiler	Dick Foran, Gale Page, Allen Jenkins	Adventure	Warner Bros.
He Couldn't Say No	Lewis Seiler	Frank McHugh, Jane Wyman, Cora Witherspoon	Romantic comedy	Warner Bros.
Held for Ransom	Clarence Bricker	Blanche Mehaffey, Grant Withers, Jack Mulhall	Action	Grand National
Her Jungle Love	George Archainbaud	Dorothy Lamour, Ray Milland, Lynne Overman	Adventure	Paramount
Heroes of the Hills	George Sherman	Robert Livingston, Ray Corrigan, Priscilla Lawson	Western	Republic
The Higgins Family	Gus Meins	James Gleason, Lucile Gleason, Lynne Roberts	Comedy	Republic
Highway Patrol	Charles C. Coleman	Robert Paige, Julie Bishop, Robert Middlemass	Action	Columbia
His Exciting Night	Gus Meins	Charles Ruggles, Marion Martin, Ona Munson	Comedy	Universal
Hold That Co-ed	George Marshall	John Barrymore, George Murphy, Joan Davis	Comedy	20th Century Fox
Hold That Kiss	Edwin L. Marin	Maureen O'Sullivan, Dennis O'Keefe, Mickey Rooney	Romantic comedy	MGM
Holiday	George Cukor	Katharine Hepburn, Cary Grant, Lew Ayres	Comedy drama	Columbia
Hollywood Stadium Mystery	David Howard	Neil Hamilton, Evelyn Venable, Barbara Pepper	Mystery	Republic
Hunted Men	Louis King	Lloyd Nolan, Mary Carlisle, Anthony Quinn	Crime	Paramount

== I–J ==
Title	Director	Cast	Genre	Notes
I Am a Criminal	William Nigh	John Carroll, Kay Linaker, Craig Reynolds	Crime	Monogram
I Am the Law	Alexander Hall	Edward G. Robinson, Otto Kruger, Barbara O'Neil	Crime	Columbia
I Demand Payment	Clifford Sanforth	Jack La Rue, Betty Burgess, Guinn Williams	Drama	Independent
I Met My Love Again	George Cukor	Joan Bennett, Henry Fonda, Louise Platt	Romance	United Artists
I Stand Accused	John H. Auer	Robert Cummings, Helen Mack, Lyle Talbot	Drama	Republic
I'll Give a Million	Walter Lang	Warner Baxter, Peter Lorre, Jean Hersholt	Comedy drama	20th Century Fox
I'm From the City	Ben Holmes	Joe Penner, Richard Lane, Lorraine Krueger	Western comedy	RKO
If I Were King	Frank Lloyd	Ronald Colman, Basil Rathbone, Frances Dee	Adventure	Paramount
Illegal Traffic	Louis King	J. Carrol Naish, Mary Carlisle, Robert Preston	Crime	Paramount
In Early Arizona	Joseph Levering	Bill Elliott, Dorothy Gulliver, Harry Woods	Western	Columbia
In Old Chicago	Henry King	Tyrone Power, Alice Faye, Don Ameche	Drama	20th Century Fox
In Old Mexico	Edward D. Venturini	William Boyd, Gabby Hayes, Russell Hayden	Western	Paramount
International Crime	Charles Lamont	Rod La Rocque, Astrid Allwyn, Thomas Jackson	Mystery	Grand National
International Settlement	Eugene Forde	Dolores del Río, George Sanders, June Lang	Drama	20th Century Fox
Invisible Enemy	John H. Auer	Alan Marshal, Tala Birell, Herbert Mundin	Crime	Republic
The Invisible Menace	John Farrow	Boris Karloff, Marie Wilson, Regis Toomey	Mystery	Warner Bros.
Island in the Sky	Herbert I. Leeds	Gloria Stuart, Michael Whalen, Leon Ames	Crime	20th Century Fox
It's All in Your Mind	Bernard B. Ray	Byron Foulger, Constance Bergen, Lynton Brent	Drama	Independent
Jezebel	William Wyler	Bette Davis, Henry Fonda, George Brent	Drama	Warner Bros.
Josette	Allan Dwan	Don Ameche, William Collier Sr., Simone Simon	Comedy	20th Century Fox
Joy of Living	Tay Garnett	Irene Dunne, Douglas Fairbanks Jr., Guy Kibbee	Musical comedy	RKO
Judge Hardy's Children	George B. Seitz	Mickey Rooney, Lewis Stone, Fay Holden	Comedy	MGM
The Jury's Secret	Edward Sloman	Kent Taylor, Fay Wray, Jane Darwell	Drama	Universal
Just Around the Corner	Irving Cummings	Shirley Temple, Charles Farrell, Franklin Pangborn	Musical comedy	20th Century Fox
Juvenile Court	D. Ross Lederman	Paul Kelly, Rita Hayworth, Frankie Darro	Crime	Columbia

== K–L ==
Title	Director	Cast	Genre	Notes
Keep Smiling	Herbert I. Leeds	Jane Withers, Gloria Stuart, Henry Wilcoxon	Comedy	20th Century Fox
Kentucky	David Butler	Loretta Young, Walter Brennan, Richard Greene	Romance	Fox
Kentucky Moonshine	David Butler	Ritz Brothers, Marjorie Weaver, Tony Martin	Comedy	20th Century Fox
Kidnapped	Otto Preminger, Alfred L. Werker	Warner Baxter, Freddie Bartholomew, Reginald Owen	Adventure	20th Century Fox
The Kid Comes Back	B. Reeves Eason	Wayne Morris, Barton MacLane, June Travis	Sports	Warner Bros.
King of Alcatraz	Robert Florey	Lloyd Nolan, Robert Preston, J. Carrol Naish	Crime	Paramount
King of the Newsboys	Bernard Vorhaus	Lew Ayres, Helen Mack, Victor Varconi	Drama	Republic
King of the Sierras	Arthur Rosson	Hobart Bosworth, Frank Campeau, Harry Harvey	Western	Grand National
Knight of the Plains	Sam Newfield	Fred Scott, Al St. John, John Merton	Western	Independent
Ladies in Distress	Gus Meins	Alison Skipworth, Robert Livingston, Virginia Grey	Drama	Republic
Lady Behave!	Lloyd Corrigan	Sally Eilers, Neil Hamilton, Joseph Schildkraut	Comedy	Republic
The Lady in the Morgue	Otis Garrett	Preston Foster, Patricia Ellis, Frank Jenks	Mystery	Universal
The Lady Objects	Erle C. Kenton	Gloria Stuart, Lanny Ross, Joan Marsh	Drama	Columbia
Land of Fighting Men	Alan James	Jack Randall, Bruce Bennett, Louise Stanley	Western	Monogram
The Last Express	Otis Garrett	Kent Taylor, Dorothea Kent, Greta Granstedt	Mystery	Universal
The Last Stand	Joseph H. Lewis	Bob Baker, Constance Moore, Fuzzy Knight	Western	Universal
The Last Warning	Albert S. Rogell	Preston Foster, Frank Jenks, Kay Linaker	Mystery	Universal
Law of the Plains	Sam Nelson	Charles Starrett, Iris Meredith, Robert Warwick	Western	Columbia
Law of the Texan	Elmer Clifton	Buck Jones, Dorothy Fay, Kenneth Harlan	Western	Columbia
Law of the Underworld	Lew Landers	Chester Morris, Anne Shirley, Eduardo Ciannelli	Crime	Universal
The Law West of Tombstone	Glenn Tryon	Tim Holt, Harry Carey, Paul Guilfoyle	Western	RKO
Lawless Valley	David Howard	George O'Brien, Kay Sutton, Walter Miller	Western	RKO
Letter of Introduction	John M. Stahl	Adolphe Menjou, Andrea Leeds, Ann Sheridan	Comedy drama	Universal
Lightning Carson Rides Again	Sam Newfield	Tim McCoy, Joan Barclay, Ted Adams	Western	Independent
The Little Adventuress	D. Ross Lederman	Edith Fellows, Julie Bishop, Richard Fiske	Adventure	Columbia
Listen, Darling	Edwin L. Marin	Judy Garland, Freddie Bartholomew, Mary Astor	Comedy, Musical	MGM
Little Miss Broadway	Irving Cummings	Shirley Temple, Jimmy Durante, Edna May Oliver	Comedy, Musical	20th Century Fox
Little Miss Roughneck	Aubrey Scotto	Edith Fellows, Julie Bishop, Leo Carrillo	Drama	Columbia
Little Miss Thoroughbred	John Farrow	John Litel, Frank McHugh, Ann Sheridan	Drama	Warner Bros.
Little Orphan Annie	Ben Holmes	Ann Gillis, Robert Kent, June Travis	Comedy	Paramount
Little Tough Guy	Harold Young	Huntz Hall, Helen Parrish, Robert Wilcox	Drama, Crime	Universal
Little Tough Guys in Society	Erle C. Kenton	Mischa Auer, Mary Boland, Edward Everett Horton	Comedy	Universal
The Lone Wolf in Paris	Albert S. Rogell	Francis Lederer, Frances Drake, Walter Kingsford	Drama, Mystery	Columbia
Lord Jeff	Sam Wood	Freddie Bartholomew, Mickey Rooney, Charles Coburn	Comedy, Crime	MGM
Love Finds Andy Hardy	George B. Seitz	Mickey Rooney, Judy Garland, Lewis Stone	Comedy, Romance	MGM
Love, Honor and Behave	Stanley Logan	Wayne Morris, Priscilla Lane, Dick Foran	Drama	Warner Bros.
Love Is a Headache	Richard Thorpe	Gladys George, Franchot Tone, Mickey Rooney	Comedy	MGM
Love on a Budget	Herbert I. Leeds	Jed Prouty, Shirley Deane, Spring Byington	Comedy	20th Century Fox

== M–N ==
Title	Director	Cast	Genre	Notes
Mad About Music	Norman Taurog	Deanna Durbin, Herbert Marshall, William Frawley	Musical	Universal
The Mad Miss Manton	Leigh Jason	Barbara Stanwyck, Henry Fonda, Sam Levene	Mystery comedy	RKO
Maid's Night Out	Ben Holmes	Joan Fontaine, Allan Lane, Cecil Kellaway	Comedy	RKO
The Main Event	Danny Dare	Julie Bishop, Robert Paige, Arthur Loft	Drama	Columbia
Making the Headlines	Lewis D. Collins	Jack Holt, Beverly Roberts, Marjorie Gateson	Crime	Columbia
Man-Proof	Karl Freund	Myrna Loy, Rosalind Russell, Walter Pidgeon	Comedy	MGM
The Man from Music Mountain	Joseph Kane	Gene Autry, Carol Hughes, Smiley Burnette	Western	Republic
A Man to Remember	Garson Kanin	Anne Shirley, Edward Ellis, Lee Bowman	Drama	RKO
Man's Country	Robert F. Hill	Jack Randall, Marjorie Reynolds, Walter Long	Western	Monogram
Marie Antoinette	W. S. Van Dyke	Norma Shearer, Tyrone Power, John Barrymore	Historical	MGM
The Marines are Here	Phil Rosen	Gordon Oliver, June Travis, Ray Walker	Comedy	Monogram
The Marines Come Thru	Louis J. Gasnier	Wallace Ford, Toby Wing, Grant Withers	Action	Grand National
Meet the Girls	Eugene Forde	June Lang, Lynn Bari, Ruth Donnelly	Comedy	20th Century Fox
Men Are Such Fools	Busby Berkeley	Priscilla Lane, Humphrey Bogart, Wayne Morris	Comedy	Warner Bros.
Men with Wings	William A. Wellman	Fred MacMurray, Ray Milland, Louise Campbell	Drama	Paramount
Merrily We Live	Norman Z. McLeod	Constance Bennett, Billie Burke, Brian Aherne	Comedy	MGM
The Mexicali Kid	Wallace Fox	Jack Randall, Wesley Barry, Eleanor Stewart	Western	Monogram
Midnight Intruder	Arthur Lubin	Louis Hayward, Eric Linden, Barbara Read	Mystery	Universal
The Missing Guest	John Rawlins	Paul Kelly, Constance Moore, William Lundigan	Horror	Universal
Mother Carey's Chickens	Rowland V. Lee	Anne Shirley, Ruby Keeler, James Ellison	Drama	RKO
Mr. Boggs Steps Out	Gordon Wiles	Stuart Erwin, Helen Chandler, Tully Marshall	Comedy	Grand National
Mr. Chump	William Clemens	Johnnie Davis, Lola Lane, Penny Singleton	Comedy	Warner Bros.
Mr. Doodle Kicks Off	Leslie Goodwins	Joe Penner, June Travis, Ben Alexander	Comedy	RKO
Mr. Moto's Gamble	James Tinling	Peter Lorre, Keye Luke, Douglas Fowley	Mystery	20th Century Fox
Mr. Moto Takes a Chance	Norman Foster	Peter Lorre, Rochelle Hudson, Robert Kent	Mystery	20th Century Fox
Mr. Wong, Detective	William Nigh	Boris Karloff, Evelyn Brent, Grant Withers	Mystery	Monogram
My Bill	John Farrow	Kay Francis, Dickie Moore, Bonita Granville	Drama	Warner Bros.
My Lucky Star	Roy Del Ruth	Sonja Henie, Cesar Romero, Richard Greene	Romantic comedy	20th Century Fox
My Old Kentucky Home	Lambert Hillyer	Evelyn Venable, Grant Richards, Bernadene Hayes	Romance	Monogram
Mysterious Mr. Moto	Norman Foster	Peter Lorre, Mary Maguire, Henry Wilcoxon	Mystery	20th Century Fox
The Mysterious Rider	Lesley Selander	Douglass Dumbrille, Sidney Toler, Russell Hayden	Western	Paramount
Mystery House	Noel M. Smith	Dick Purcell, Ann Sheridan, Anne Nagel	Mystery	Warner Bros.
The Mystic Circle Murders	Frank O'Connor	Robert Fiske, Arthur Gardner, Betty Compson	Drama	Grand National
Nancy Drew... Detective	William Clemens	Bonita Granville, John Litel, Frank Orth	Mystery	Warner Bros.
Newsboys' Home	Harold Young	Jackie Cooper, Edmund Lowe, Wendy Barrie	Crime	Universal
Next Time I Marry	Garson Kanin	Lucille Ball, James Ellison, Mantan Moreland	Comedy	RKO
The Night Hawk	Sidney Salkow	Robert Livingston, June Travis, Robert Armstrong	Crime	Republic
Night Spot	Christy Cabanne	Allan Lane, Joan Woodbury, Lee Patrick	Comedy	RKO
No Time to Marry	Harry Lachman	Richard Arlen, Mary Astor, Virginia Dale	Comedy	Columbia
Numbered Woman	Karl Brown	Sally Blane, Lloyd Hughes, Mayo Methot	Drama	Monogram
The Nurse from Brooklyn	S. Sylvan Simon	Sally Eilers, Paul Kelly, Larry J. Blake	Drama	Universal

== O–P ==
Title	Director	Cast	Genre	Notes
Of Human Hearts	Clarence Brown	Walter Huston, James Stewart, John Carradine	Western	MGM
The Old Barn Dance	Joseph Kane	Gene Autry, Smiley Burnette, Roy Rogers	Western	Republic
On the Great White Trail	Albert Herman	James Newill, Robert Frazer, Richard Alexander	Western	Grand National
One Wild Night	Eugene Forde	June Lang, Dick Baldwin, Lyle Talbot	Comedy	20th Century Fox
Orphans of the Street	John H. Auer	Robert Livingston, June Storey, Ralph Morgan	Drama	Republic
Out West with the Hardys	George B. Seitz	Mickey Rooney, Lewis Stone, Fay Holden	Comedy	MGM
Outlaw Express	George Waggner	Bob Baker, Cecilia Callejo, Don Barclay	Western	Universal
Outlaws of Sonora	George Sherman	Robert Livingston, Ray Corrigan, Jack Mulhall	Western	Republic
Outside of Paradise	John H. Auer	Phil Regan, Penny Singleton, Bert Gordon	Comedy	Republic
Over the Wall	Frank McDonald	Dick Foran, John Litel, Veda Ann Borg	Drama	Warner Bros.
The Overland Express	Drew Eberson	Buck Jones, Marjorie Reynolds, Maston Williams	Western	Columbia
Overland Stage Raiders	George Sherman	John Wayne, Ray Corrigan, Louise Brooks	Western	Republic
Painted Desert	David Howard	George O'Brien, Laraine Day, Ray Whitley	Western	RKO
The Painted Trail	Robert F. Hill	Tom Keene, Eleanor Stewart, LeRoy Mason	Western	Monogram
Pals of the Saddle	George Sherman	John Wayne, Ray Corrigan, Doreen McKay	Western	Republic
Panamint's Bad Man	Ray Taylor	Smith Ballew, Evelyn Daw, Noah Beery	Western	20th Century Fox
Paradise for Three	Edward Buzzell	Robert Young, Mary Astor, Frank Morgan	Comedy	MGM
Paroled from the Big House	Elmer Clifton	Jean Carmen, Ted Adams, Gwen Lee	Crime	Independent
Paroled - To Die	Sam Newfield	Bob Steele, Karl Hackett, Horace Murphy	Western	Republic
Partners of the Plains	Lesley Selander	William Boyd, Russell Hayden, Gwen Gaze	Western	Paramount
Passport Husband	James Tinling	Stuart Erwin, Pauline Moore, Joan Woodbury	Comedy	20th Century Fox
The Patient in Room 18	Crane Wilbur	Ann Sheridan, Patric Knowles, John Ridgely	Mystery	Warner Bros.
Peck's Bad Boy with the Circus	Sam Wood	Tommy Kelly, Edgar Kennedy, Billy Gilbert	Comedy	RKO
Penitentiary	John Brahm	Walter Connolly, Jean Parker, John Howard	Crime	Columbia
Penrod and His Twin Brother	William C. McGann	Billy and Bobby Mauch, Frank Craven, Spring Byington	Comedy	Warner Bros.
Penrod's Double Trouble	Lewis Seiler	Billy and Bobby Mauch, Gene Lockhart, Kathleen Lockhart	Comedy	Warner Bros.
Personal Secretary	Otis Garrett	William Gargan, Joy Hodges, Ruth Donnelly	Comedy	Universal
Phantom Gold	Joseph Levering	Jack Luden, Beth Marion, Slim Whitaker	Western	Columbia
Phantom Ranger	Sam Newfield	Tim McCoy, Suzanne Kaaren, Karl Hackett	Western	Monogram
Pioneer Trail	Joseph Levering	Jack Luden, Joan Barclay, Slim Whitaker	Western	Columbia
The Port of Missing Girls	Karl Brown	Harry Carey, Judith Allen, Milburn Stone	Mystery	Monogram
Port of Seven Seas	James Whale	Wallace Beery, Maureen O'Sullivan, Frank Morgan	Drama	MGM
Prairie Justice	George Waggner	Bob Baker, Dorothy Fay, Jack Rockwell	Western	Universal
Prairie Moon	Ralph Staub	Gene Autry, Smiley Burnette, Shirley Deane	Western	Republic
Pride of the West	Lesley Selander	William Boyd, Russell Hayden, Russell Hayden	Western	Paramount
Prison Break	Arthur Lubin	Barton MacLane, Glenda Farrell, Ward Bond	Drama	Universal
Prison Farm	Louis King	Lloyd Nolan, Shirley Ross, May Boley	Crime	Paramount
Prison Nurse	James Cruze	Henry Wilcoxon, Marian Marsh, Bernadene Hayes	Drama	Republic
Prison Train	Gordon Wiles	Fred Keating, Dorothy Comingore, Faith Bacon	Crime	Independent
Professor Beware	Elliott Nugent	Harold Lloyd, Phyllis Welch, Lionel Stander	Comedy	Paramount
The Purple Vigilantes	George Sherman	Robert Livingston, Ray Corrigan, Joan Barclay	Western	Republic

== R–S ==
Title	Director	Cast	Genre	Notes
Racket Busters	Lloyd Bacon	George Brent, Allen Jenkins, Humphrey Bogart	Crime	Warner Bros.
Radio City Revels	Benjamin Stoloff	Jack Oakie, Bob Burns, Ann Miller	Musical comedy	RKO
The Rangers' Round-Up	Sam Newfield	Fred Scott, Al St. John, Christine McIntyre	Western	Independent
The Rage of Paris	Henry Koster	Danielle Darrieux, Douglas Fairbanks Jr., Mischa Auer	Romantic comedy	Universal
Rascals	H. Bruce Humberstone	Jane Withers, Rochelle Hudson, Robert Wilcox	Comedy	20th Century Fox
Rawhide	Ray Taylor	Lou Gehrig, Smith Ballew, Evalyn Knapp	Western	20th Century Fox
Rebecca of Sunnybrook Farm	Allan Dwan	Shirley Temple, Randolph Scott, Helen Westley	Comedy drama	20th Century Fox
Rebellious Daughters	Jean Yarbrough	Marjorie Reynolds, Verna Hillie, Sheila Bromley	Drama	Independent
Reckless Living	Frank McDonald	Robert Wilcox, Nan Grey, William Lundigan	Drama	Universal
Red River Range	George Sherman	John Wayne, Ray Corrigan, Max Terhune	Western	Republic
Reformatory	Lewis D. Collins	Jack Holt, Charlotte Wynters, Grant Mitchell	Crime	Columbia
The Renegade Ranger	David Howard	George O'Brien, Rita Hayworth, Tim Holt	Western	RKO
Rhythm of the Saddle	George Sherman	Gene Autry, Peggy Moran, Smiley Burnette	Western	Republic
Rich Man, Poor Girl	Reinhold Schünzel	Lew Ayres, Robert Young, Lana Turner	Comedy	MGM
Ride a Crooked Mile	Alfred E. Green	Frances Farmer, Akim Tamiroff, Lynne Overman	Western	Paramount
Riders of the Black Hills	George Sherman	Robert Livingston, Ray Corrigan, Ann Evers	Western	Republic
Rio Grande	Sam Nelson	Charles Starrett, Ann Doran, Bob Nolan	Western	Columbia
Road Demon	Otto Brower	Henry Arthur, Joan Valerie, Henry Armetta	Crime	20th Century Fox
The Road to Reno	S. Sylvan Simon	Randolph Scott, Hope Hampton, Glenda Farrell	Comedy	Universal
Rolling Caravans	Joseph Levering	Jack Luden, Eleanor Stewart, Harry Woods	Western	Columbia
Rollin' Plains	Albert Herman	Tex Ritter, Karl Hackett, Horace Murphy	Western	Grand National
Romance in the Dark	H. C. Potter	Gladys Swarthout, John Boles, John Barrymore	Comedy, Musical, Romance	Paramount
Romance of the Limberlost	William Nigh	Jean Parker, Eric Linden, Marjorie Main	Drama	Monogram
Romance on the Run	Gus Meins	Donald Woods, Patricia Ellis, Grace Bradley	Comedy crime	Republic
Room Service	William A. Seiter	Marx Brothers, Lucille Ball, Ann Miller	Comedy	RKO
Rough Riding Rhythm	J.P. McGowan	Kermit Maynard, Beryl Wallace, Olin Francis	Western	Independent
Rose of the Rio Grande	William Nigh	John Carroll, Movita, Gino Corrado	Adventure	Monogram
Safety in Numbers	Malcolm St. Clair	Jed Prouty, Shirley Deane, Spring Byington	Comedy	20th Century Fox
The Saint in New York	Ben Holmes	Louis Hayward, Kay Sutton, Jack Carson	Thriller	RKO
Saleslady	Arthur Greville Collins	Anne Nagel, Weldon Heyburn, Kenneth Harlan	Comedy	Monogram
Sally, Irene and Mary	William A. Seiter	Alice Faye, Marjorie Weaver, Joan Davis	Comedy	20th Century Fox
Santa Fe Stampede	George Sherman	John Wayne, Ray Corrigan, June Martel	Western	Republic
Say It in French	Andrew L. Stone	Ray Milland, Irene Hervey, Mary Carlisle	Comedy	Paramount
Scandal Street	James P. Hogan	Lew Ayres, Louise Campbell, Lucien Littlefield	Drama	Paramount
Secrets of a Nurse	Arthur Lubin	Dick Foran, Helen Mack, Edmund Lowe	Mystery	Universal
Secrets of an Actress	William Keighley	Kay Francis, George Brent, Ian Hunter	Drama	Warner Bros.
Sergeant Murphy	B. Reeves Eason	Ronald Reagan, Mary Maguire, Donald Crisp	Comedy	Warner Bros.
Service de Luxe	Rowland V. Lee	Constance Bennett, Vincent Price, Charlie Ruggles	Comedy	Universal
Shadows Over Shanghai	Charles Lamont	Ralph Morgan, Robert Barrat, Robert Barrat	Drama	Grand National
Sharpshooters	James Tinling	Brian Donlevy, Lynn Bari, Douglass Dumbrille	Adventure	20th Century Fox
Shine On, Harvest Moon	Joseph Kane	Roy Rogers, Lynne Roberts, Stanley Andrews	Western	Republic
The Shining Hour	Frank Borzage	Joan Crawford, Margaret Sullavan, Melvyn Douglas	Drama	MGM
The Shopworn Angel	H. C. Potter	James Stewart, Margaret Sullavan, Walter Pidgeon	War drama	MGM
Sing You Sinners	Wesley Ruggles	Bing Crosby, Fred MacMurray, Ellen Drew	Musical comedy	Paramount
The Singing Outlaw	Joseph H. Lewis	Bob Baker, Joan Barclay, Fuzzy Knight	Western	Universal
Sinners in Paradise	James Whale	Bruce Cabot, Marion Martin, Gene Lockhart	Adventure	Universal
The Sisters	Anatole Litvak	Bette Davis, Errol Flynn, Anita Louise	Drama	Warner Bros.
Six Gun Trail	Sam Newfield	Tim McCoy, Nora Lane, Ben Corbett	Western	Independent
Six-Shootin' Sheriff	Harry Fraser	Ken Maynard, Marjorie Reynolds, Lafe McKee	Western	Grand National
Sky Giant	Lew Landers	Joan Fontaine, Richard Dix, Harry Carey	Adventure	RKO
Slander House	Charles Lamont	Adrienne Ames, Craig Reynolds, Esther Ralston	Drama	Independent
A Slight Case of Murder	Lloyd Bacon	Edward G. Robinson, Jane Bryan, John Litel	Comedy crime	Warner Bros.
Smashing the Rackets	Lew Landers	Chester Morris, Rita Johnson, Frances Mercer	Drama	RKO
Smashing the Spy Ring	Christy Cabanne	Ralph Bellamy, Fay Wray, Ann Doran	Mystery	Columbia
Song of the Buckaroo	Albert Herman	Tex Ritter, Jinx Falkenburg, Tom London	Western	Monogram
Songs and Bullets	Sam Newfield	Fred Scott, Al St. John, Charles King	Western	Independent
Songs and Saddles	Harry L. Fraser	Gene Austin, Henry Roquemore, Charles King	Western	Grand National
Sons of the Legion	James P. Hogan	Lynne Overman, Evelyn Keyes, Tim Holt	Drama	Paramount
South of Arizona	Sam Nelson	Charles Starrett, Iris Meredith, Bob Nolan	Western	Columbia
Spawn of the North	Henry Hathaway	George Raft, Henry Fonda, Dorothy Lamour	Adventure	Paramount
Special Inspector	Leon Barsha	Charles Quigley, Rita Hayworth, George McKay	Crime	Columbia
Speed to Burn	Otto Brower	Michael Whalen, Lynn Bari, Henry Armetta	Crime	20th Century Fox
Spirit of Youth	Harry L. Fraser	Joe Louis, Mantan Moreland, Edna May Harris	Sports	Independent
Spring Madness	S. Sylvan Simon	Maureen O'Sullivan, Lew Ayres, Burgess Meredith	Comedy	MGM
The Spy Ring	Joseph H. Lewis	William Hall, Jane Wyman, Esther Ralston	Thriller	Universal
Squadron of Honor	Charles C. Coleman	Don Terry, Mary Russell, Thurston Hall	Action	Columbia
Stablemates	Sam Wood	Wallace Beery, Mickey Rooney, Arthur Hohl	Sports	MGM
Stagecoach Days	Joseph Levering	Jack Luden, Eleanor Stewart, Harry Woods	Western	Columbia
Starlight Over Texas	Albert Herman	Tex Ritter, Carmen Laroux, Rosa Turich	Western	Monogram
Start Cheering	Albert S. Rogell	Jimmy Durante, Joan Perry, Walter Connolly	Comedy	Columbia
State Police	John Rawlins	William Lundigan, Constance Moore, John King	Crime	Universal
Stolen Heaven	Andrew L. Stone	Gene Raymond, Glenda Farrell, Lewis Stone	Drama	Paramount
The Storm	Harold Young	Charles Bickford, Barton MacLane, Nan Grey	Drama	Universal
Storm Over Bengal	Sidney Salkow	Patric Knowles, Richard Cromwell, Rochelle Hudson	Adventure	Republic
Straight, Place and Show	David Butler	Ritz Brothers, Ethel Merman, Richard Arlen	Comedy	20th Century Fox
Strange Faces	Errol Taggart	Dorothea Kent, Frank Jenks, Mary Treen	Drama	Universal
The Stranger from Arizona	Elmer Clifton	Buck Jones, Dorothy Fay, Roy Barcroft	Western	Columbia
The Strange Case of Dr. Meade	Lewis D. Collins	Jack Holt, Beverly Roberts, John Qualen	Mystery	Columbia
Submarine Patrol	John Ford	Preston Foster, Richard Greene, Nancy Kelly	Adventure	20th Century Fox
Sunset Murder Case	Louis J. Gasnier	Sally Rand, Esther Muir, Vince Barnett	Mystery	Grand National
Suez	Allan Dwan	Tyrone Power, Loretta Young, Annabella	Historical	20th Century Fox
Sweethearts	W. S. Van Dyke	Jeanette MacDonald, Nelson Eddy, Frank Morgan	Musical	MGM
Swing It, Sailor!	Raymond Cannon	Wallace Ford, Isabel Jewell, Mary Treen	Comedy	Grand National
Swing!	Oscar Micheaux	Cora Green, Amanda Randolph, Trixie Smith	Musical	Independent
Swing, Sister, Swing	Joseph Santley	Ken Murray, Johnny Downs, Nana Bryant	Musical	Universal
Swing That Cheer	Harold D. Schuster	Tom Brown, Robert Wilcox, Constance Moore	Sports comedy	Universal
Swing Your Lady	Ray Enright	Frank McHugh, Humphrey Bogart, Penny Singleton	Musical	Warner Bros.
Swiss Miss	John G. Blystone	Stan Laurel, Oliver Hardy, Grete Natzler, Eric Blore	Comedy	MGM

== T–U ==
Title	Director	Cast	Genre	Notes
Tarnished Angel	Leslie Goodwins	Sally Eilers, Ann Miller, Paul Guilfoyle	Drama	RKO
Tarzan's Revenge	D. Ross Lederman	Glenn Morris, Eleanor Holm, Hedda Hopper	Adventure	20th Century Fox
Ten Laps to Go	Elmer Clifton	Rex Lease, Muriel Evans, Duncan Renaldo	Action	Independent
Tenth Avenue Kid	Bernard Vorhaus	Bruce Cabot, Beverly Roberts, Horace McMahon	Crime	Republic
The Terror of Tiny Town	Sam Newfield	Billy Curtis, "Little Billy" Rhodes, Charlie Becker	Western comedy	Columbia
Test Pilot	Victor Fleming, Howard Hawks	Clark Gable, Myrna Loy, Spencer Tracy	Drama	MGM
The Texans	James P. Hogan	Joan Bennett, Randolph Scott, Robert Cummings	Western	Paramount
Thanks for Everything	William A. Seiter	Jack Oakie, Adolphe Menjou, Jack Haley	Comedy	20th Century Fox
Thanks for the Memory	George Archainbaud	Bob Hope, Shirley Ross, Otto Kruger	Comedy	Paramount
That Certain Age	Edward Ludwig	Deanna Durbin, Melvyn Douglas, Jackie Cooper	Musical comedy	Universal
There Goes My Heart	Norman Z. McLeod, Hal Roach	Fredric March, Patsy Kelly, Virginia Bruce	Comedy	United Artists
There's That Woman Again	Alexander Hall	Melvyn Douglas, Virginia Bruce, Margaret Lindsay	Comedy mystery	Columbia
There's Always a Woman	Alexander Hall	Joan Blondell, Melvyn Douglas, Mary Astor	Comedy mystery	Columbia
This Marriage Business	Christy Cabanne	Victor Moore, Cecil Kellaway, Jack Carson	Comedy	RKO
Three Blind Mice	William A. Seiter	Loretta Young, Joel McCrea, David Niven	Comedy	20th Century Fox
Three Comrades	Frank Borzage	Robert Taylor, Franchot Tone, Guy Kibbee	Drama	MGM
Three Loves Has Nancy	Richard Thorpe	Janet Gaynor, Robert Montgomery, Franchot Tone	Comedy	MGM
Thunder in the Desert	Sam Newfield	Bob Steele, Louise Stanley, Charles King	Western	Republic
Time Out for Murder	H. Bruce Humberstone	Gloria Stuart, Michael Whalen, Douglas Fowley	Crime	20th Century Fox
Tip-Off Girls	Louis King	Mary Carlisle, Lloyd Nolan, Roscoe Karns	Crime	Paramount
Tom Sawyer, Detective	Louis King	Billy Cook, Donald O'Connor, Janet Waldo	Mystery	Paramount
Too Hot to Handle	Jack Conway	Clark Gable, Myrna Loy, Walter Pidgeon	Comedy	MGM
Topa Topa	Vin Moore	Joan Valerie, James Bush, LeRoy Mason	Western	Grand National
Topper Takes a Trip	Norman Z. McLeod	Constance Bennett, Roland Young, Billie Burke	Comedy	United Artists
Torchy Blane in Panama	William Clemens	Lola Lane, Paul Kelly, Tom Kennedy	Mystery	Warner Bros.
Torchy Gets Her Man	William Beaudine	Glenda Farrell, Barton MacLane, Tom Kennedy	Mystery	Warner Bros.
Touchdown, Army	Kurt Neumann	John Howard, Mary Carlisle, Robert Cummings	Comedy	Paramount
Tough Kid	Howard Bretherton	Frankie Darro, Dick Purcell, Judith Allen	Crime	Monogram
The Toy Wife	Richard Thorpe	Luise Rainer, Melvyn Douglas, H. B. Warner	Drama	MGM
Trade Winds	Tay Garnett	Joan Bennett, Fredric March, Ann Sothern	Comedy	United Artists
A Trip to Paris	Malcolm St. Clair	Jed Prouty, Shirley Deane, Spring Byington	Comedy	20th Century Fox
Tropic Holiday	Theodore Reed	Bob Burns, Dorothy Lamour, Ray Milland	Musical comedy	Paramount
Two Gun Justice	Alan James	Tim McCoy, Betty Compson, Joan Barclay	Western	Monogram
Two-Gun Man from Harlem	Richard C. Kahn	Herb Jeffries, Marguerite Whitten, Mantan Moreland	Western	Independent
Under the Big Top	Karl Brown	Marjorie Main, Anne Nagel, Jack La Rue	Drama	Monogram
Under Western Stars	Joseph Kane	Roy Rogers, Carol Hughes, Smiley Burnette	Western	Republic
Up the River	Alfred L. Werker	Preston Foster, Arthur Treacher, Phyllis Brooks	Comedy	20th Century Fox
Utah Trail	Albert Herman	Tex Ritter, Horace Murphy, Pamela Blake	Western	Grand National

== V–Z ==
Title	Director	Cast	Genre	Notes
Vacation from Love	George Fitzmaurice	Florence Rice, Reginald Owen, Dennis O'Keefe	Comedy	MGM
Valley of the Giants	William Keighley	Claire Trevor, Wayne Morris, Charles Bickford	Adventure	Warner Bros.
Vivacious Lady	George Stevens	James Stewart, Ginger Rogers, Beulah Bondi	Comedy	RKO
Walking Down Broadway	Norman Foster	Claire Trevor, Leah Ray, Phyllis Brooks	Drama	20th Century Fox
Wanted by the Police	Howard Bretherton	Frankie Darro, Evalyn Knapp, Robert Kent	Crime	Monogram
West of Cheyenne	Sam Nelson	Charles Starrett, Iris Meredith, Bob Nolan	Western	Columbia
West of Rainbow's End	Alan James	Tim McCoy, Walter McGrail, George Cooper	Western	Monogram
West of the Santa Fe	Sam Nelson	Charles Starrett, Iris Meredith, Dick Curtis	Western	Columbia
Western Jamboree	Ralph Staub	Gene Autry, Jean Rouverol, Esther Muir	Western	Republic
Western Trails	George Waggner	Bob Baker, Marjorie Reynolds, John Ridgely	Western	Universal
When G-Men Step In	Charles C. Coleman	Don Terry, Julie Bishop, Robert Paige	Action	Columbia
When Were You Born	William C. McGann	Margaret Lindsay, Anna May Wong, Lola Lane	Mystery	Warner Bros.
Where the Buffalo Roam	Al Herman	Tex Ritter, Dorothy Short, Horace Murphy	Western	Monogram
Where the West Begins	J. P. McGowan	Jack Randall, Fuzzy Knight, Luana Walters	Western	Monogram
While New York Sleeps	H. Bruce Humberstone	Michael Whalen, Jean Rogers, Chick Chandler	Crime	20th Century Fox
Whirlwind Horseman	Robert F. Hill	Ken Maynard, Joan Barclay, Kenneth Harlan	Western	Grand National
White Banners	Edmund Goulding	Claude Rains, Fay Bainter, Jackie Cooper	Drama	Warner Bros.
Who Killed Gail Preston?	Leon Barsha	Don Terry, Rita Hayworth, Robert Paige	Crime	Columbia
Wide Open Faces	Kurt Neumann	Joe E. Brown, Jane Wyman, Lucien Littlefield	Comedy	Columbia
Wild Horse Canyon	Robert F. Hill	Jack Randall, Dorothy Short, Warner Richmond	Western	Monogram
Wives Under Suspicion	James Whale	Warren William, Gail Patrick, Constance Moore	Crime	Universal
Woman Against Woman	Robert B. Sinclair	Herbert Marshall, Virginia Bruce, Mary Astor	Drama	MGM
Women Are Like That	Stanley Logan	Kay Francis, Pat O'Brien, Melville Cooper	Drama	Warner Bros.
Women in Prison	Lambert Hillyer	Scott Kolk, Mayo Methot, Arthur Loft	Drama	Columbia
A Yank at Oxford	Jack Conway	Robert Taylor, Maureen O'Sullivan, Vivien Leigh	Comedy drama	MGM
Yellow Jack	George B. Seitz	Robert Montgomery, Virginia Bruce, Buddy Ebsen	Drama	MGM
You and Me	Fritz Lang	Sylvia Sidney, George Raft, Barton MacLane	Film noir	Paramount
You Can't Take It with You	Frank Capra	James Stewart, Jean Arthur, Lionel Barrymore	Comedy	Columbia
Young Dr. Kildare	Sam Wood	Lew Ayres, Lionel Barrymore, Emma Dunn	Drama	MGM
Young Fugitives	John Rawlins	Robert Wilcox, Harry Davenport, Dorothea Kent	Crime drama	Universal
The Young in Heart	Richard Wallace	Janet Gaynor, Douglas Fairbanks Jr., Billie Burke	Comedy drama	United Artists
Youth Takes a Fling	Archie Mayo	Joel McCrea, Andrea Leeds, Dorothea Kent	Comedy	Universal

== Short films ==
Title	Director	Cast	Genre	Notes
The Ship That Died	Jacques Tourneur	John Nesbitt, Leonard Penn, Rhea Mitchell	Short drama	
Too Much Johnson	Orson Welles	Joseph Cotten, Virginia Nicolson	Comedy	Never publicly released

== See also ==
- 1938 in the United States
