= Sundown on the Prairie =

- Theatrical release poster
- Directed by: Albert Herman
- Screenplay by: William L. Nolte; Edmond Kelso
- Produced by: Edward Finney
- Starring: Tex Ritter; Dorothy Fay; Horace Murphy; Karl Hackett; Charles King; Hank Worden
- Cinematography: Bert Longenecker
- Edited by: Holbrook N. Todd
- Production company: Monogram Pictures
- Distributed by: Monogram Pictures
- Release date: February 8, 1939
- Running time: 59 minutes
- Country: United States
- Language: English

Sundown on the Prairie is a 1939 American Western film directed by Albert Herman and written by William L. Nolte and Edmond Kelso. The film stars Tex Ritter, Dorothy Fay, Horace Murphy, Karl Hackett, Charles King and Hank Worden. The film was released on February 8, 1939, by Monogram Pictures.

== Cast ==
- Tex Ritter as Tex
- Dorothy Fay as Ruth Graham
- Horace Murphy as Ananias
- Karl Hackett as Jack Hendricks
- Charles King as Nate Dorgan
- Hank Worden as Hank
- Frank Ellis as Chuck
- Wally West as Slim
- Ernie Adams as Blackie
- Frank LaRue as Graham
- Edward Peil Sr. as John
- Junita Street as Saloon Singer
