= Rollin' Westward =

1939 film directed by Albert Herman

- Theatrical release poster
- Directed by: Albert Herman
- Screenplay by: Fred Myton
- Produced by: Edward Finney
- Starring: Tex Ritter; Dorothy Fay; Horace Murphy; Slim Whitaker; Herbert Corthell; Harry Harvey Sr.
- Cinematography: Marcel Le Picard
- Edited by: Fred Bain
- Music by: Frank Sanucci
- Production company: Monogram Pictures
- Distributed by: Monogram Pictures
- Release date: March 1, 1939
- Running time: 55 minutes
- Country: United States
- Language: English

Rollin' Westward is a 1939 American Western film directed by Albert Herman, written by Fred Myton, starring Tex Ritter and released on March 1 by Monogram Pictures.

== Cast ==
- Tex Ritter as Tex Ramsey
- Dorothy Fay as Betty Lawson
- Horace Murphy as Missouri
- Slim Whitaker as Bart
- Herbert Corthell as Tug Lawson
- Harry Harvey Sr. as Lem Watkins
- Charles King as Pat Haines
- Hank Worden as Slim Regan
- Dave O'Brien as Red
- Bob Terry as Jeff
- Tom London as Sheriff
- Rudy Sooter as Bass Player
- Snub Pollard as Poker Player (uncredited)
