= Chick Hannan =

American actor and radio performer

- Born: Chester William Hannan; May 24, 1901; Iron River, Michigan, U.S.
- Died: August 14, 1980 (aged 79); San Fernando, California, U.S.
- Occupation: Actor
- Spouse: Delia Hannan (m. 1957)
- Children: 1

Chester William Hannan (May 24, 1901 – August 14, 1980) was an American actor and rodeo performer. He was known for starring as Yucca Bill Thompson in the 1937 film Stars Over Arizona.

Hannan was born in Iron River, Michigan. In 1924, he traveled to England with the Tex Austin Rodeo. Hannan moved to California in the 1930s. Hannan began his career in 1933, first appearing in the serial film The Three Musketeers, which starred John Wayne and Ruth Hall. Hannan made over 370 film and television appearances.

Hannan appeared in films, such as, The Red Rider (1934), starring Buck Jones; Trouble in Texas (1937), starring Tex Ritter; The Utah Trail (1938), again with Tex Ritter; The Lone Ranger Rides Again (1939), starring Robert Livingston; King of the Texas Rangers (1941), starring Sammy Baugh; West of the Rio Grande (1944), starring Johnny Mack Brown; Lone Texas Ranger (1945), starring Wild Bill Elliott; Roaring Rangers (1946), starring Charles Starrett and Smiley Burnette; Raiders of the South (1947), again with Johnny Mack Brown; Return of the Bad Men (1948), starring Randolph Scott, Robert Ryan, Anne Jeffreys, George "Gabby" Hayes and Jacqueline White; Across the Rio Grande (1949), starring Jimmy Wakely; Code of the Silver Sage (1950), starring Allan Lane; The Brass Legend (1956), starring Hugh O'Brian and The Gunfight at Dodge City (1959), starring Joel McCrea. His final film credit was from the 1966 film A Big Hand for the Little Lady, which starred Henry Fonda, Joanne Woodward and Jason Robards. In his film career, he served as a double for actor and musician Tex Ritter's wife Dorothy Fay and also for other actresses.

Hannan's television credits includes Gunsmoke, Bonanza, Wagon Train, The Virginian, The Life and Legend of Wyatt Earp, The Deputy, Bat Masterson, Tales of Wells Fargo, Death Valley Days, The Restless Gun, Sugarfoot and The Adventures of Kit Carson. He was an on-set representative for the American Humane.

He died in August 1980 in San Fernando, California, at the age of 79.

== Selected Filmography ==
- The Lusty Men (1952) as Cowboy (uncredited)
- Alfred Hitchcock Presents (1960) (Season 5 Episode 25: "The Little Man Who Was There") as Townsman (uncredited)
