= Riders of the Frontier =

1939 film

- Directed by: Spencer Gordon Bennett
- Written by: Jesse Duffy and; Joseph Levering; (story and screenplay by)
- Produced by: Scott R. Dunlap (in charge of production)
- Starring: Tex Ritter with his horse "White Flash"
- Cinematography: Marcel A. LePicard, A.S.C.
- Edited by: Fred Bain
- Music by: Frank Sanucci (uncredited)
- Production company: An Edward Finney Production
- Distributed by: Monogram Pictures Corporation
- Release date: August 16, 1939
- Running time: 58 minutes
- Country: United States
- Language: English

Riders of the Frontier, also known as Ridin' the Frontier, is a 1939 American Western film directed by Spencer Gordon Bennett and starring Tex Ritter with his horse "White Flash". It is a remake of the 1936 film The Cattle Thief.

== Plot ==
Lawman Tex Lowry pretends to be outlaw Ed Carter to infiltrate the outlaw gang led by Sarah's ranch foreman Bart Lane and his henchmen Buck, Sam, Gus and Boney and to save Sarah's nurse Martha from being taken captive by the gang.

== Cast ==
- Tex Ritter as Tex Lowry

with his horse "White Flash"

- John Rutherford as Bart Lane
- Hal Taliaferro as Buck
- Olin Francis as Sam
- Nolan Willis as Gus
- Roy Barcroft as Ed Carter
- Merrill McCormick as Boney
- Manten Moreland as Cookie
- Edw. Cecil as Doctor
- Bruce Mitchell as Marshal
- Jean Joyce as Martha
- Marin Sais as Sarah
- Maxine Leslie as Goldie

Uncredited

- Bob Card as henchman
- Jack Evans as henchman
- Chick Hannan as murdered deputy
- Jack Hendricks as henchman
- Jack King as deputy
- Clyde McClary as deputy
- Tex Palmer as henchman

== Bibliography ==
- Pitts, Michael R. Western Movies: A Guide to 5,105 Feature Films. McFarland, 2012.
