= Roll Wagons Roll =

1940 film

- Directed by: Albert Herman
- Written by: Victor Adamson; Edmond Kelso; Roger Merton
- Produced by: Edward Finney
- Starring: Tex Ritter; Nelson McDowell; Muriel Evans
- Cinematography: Marcel Le Picard
- Edited by: Fred Bain
- Music by: Frank Sanucci
- Production company: Edward F. Finney Productions
- Distributed by: Monogram Pictures
- Release date: August 16, 1940
- Running time: 56 minutes
- Country: United States
- Language: English

Roll Wagons Roll is a 1940 American Western film directed by Albert Herman and starring Tex Ritter, Nelson McDowell and Muriel Evans.

== Cast ==
- Tex Ritter as Tex Masters
- Nelson McDowell as Rawhide
- Muriel Evans as Ruth Benson
- Nolan Willis as Henchman Slade
- Steve Clark as Henchman Trigger
- Tom London as Henchman Matt Grimes
- Reed Howes as Steve Coleman
- Frank Ellis as Doc Williams
- Kenne Duncan as Captain Clay
- Frank LaRue as Benson
- Chick Hannan as Pioneer Rider
- Victor Adamson as Wagon Driver
- Gene Alsace as Wagon Train Man

== Bibliography ==
- Bond, Johnny. The Tex Ritter Story. Chappell Music Company, 1976.
