= Song of the Buckaroo =

- Theatrical release poster
- Directed by: Albert Herman
- Screenplay by: John Rathmell
- Produced by: Edward Finney
- Starring: Tex Ritter; Jinx Falkenburg; Mary Ruth; Tom London; Frank LaRue; Charles King
- Cinematography: Francis Corby
- Edited by: Fred Bain
- Production company: Monogram Pictures
- Distributed by: Monogram Pictures
- Release date: December 7, 1938
- Running time: 58 minutes
- Country: United States
- Language: English

Song of the Buckaroo is a 1938 American Western film directed by Albert Herman and written by John Rathmell. The film stars Tex Ritter, Jinx Falkenburg, Mary Ruth, Tom London, Frank LaRue and Charles King. The film was released on December 7, 1938, by Monogram Pictures.

== Plot ==
In order to escape the law, a bandit takes the identity of a dead man, when his dead alter ego gets elected as mayor he decides to change his outlaw ways.

== Cast ==
- Tex Ritter as Texas Dan
- Jinx Falkenburg as Evelyn Bayliss
- Mary Ruth as Mary Ruth Alden
- Tom London as Sheriff Wade
- Frank LaRue as Rev. Bayliss
- Charles King as Max Groat
- Bob Terry as Neal
- Horace Murphy as Cashaway
- George Chesebro as Fargo
- Snub Pollard as Perky
- Ernie Adams as Cashier
- Dave O'Brien as Tex Alden
- Dorothy Fay as Anna Alden
