= Sing, Cowboy, Sing =

1937 film by Robert N. Bradbury (as R.N. Bradbury)

- Film poster
- Directed by: Robert N. Bradbury (as R.N. Bradbury)
- Screenplay by: Robert Emmett Tansey
- Produced by: Edward Finney (as Edward F. Finney)
- Starring: Tex Ritter; White Flash
- Cinematography: Gus Peterson
- Edited by: Frederick Bain
- Color process: Black and white
- Production companies: Boots and Saddles Pictures
- Distributed by: Grand National Pictures
- Release date: May 22, 1937
- Running time: 59 minutes
- Country: United States
- Language: English

Sing, Cowboy, Sing is a 1937 American Western film directed by Robert N. Bradbury and starring Tex Ritter and White Flash.

== Plot ==
Drifters Tex and Duke happen to ride upon the massacre of a group hauling freight for the community by a gang hired by someone who wishes the lucrative business by himself so he can run the entire valley. Taking the only survivor, Madge daughter of the late owner of the freight hauling line to the nearest town, Tex and Duke take over the dangerous hauling business themselves for Madge.

The pair get jobs as entertainers in Judge Roy Dean's (according to a title card of the film, not based on Judge Roy Bean) combination saloon and courtroom to discover who is responsible for the massacre.

== Cast ==
- Tex Ritter as Tex Archer
- White Flash as Tex Archer's horse
- Louise Stanley as Madge Summers
- Al St. John as Duke Evans
- Charles King as Henchman Red Holman
- Karl Hackett as Kalmus
- Robert McKenzie as Judge Roy Dean
- Horace Murphy as Marshal Tinker
- 'Snub' Pollard as Man fined $28
- Hank Worden as Henchman
- Chick Hannon as Henchman Joe
- Milburn Morante as Zeke
- Oscar Gahan as Townsman
- The Texas Tornadoes as Saloon musicians

== Soundtrack ==
- Tex Ritter with Al St. John - "Goodbye Old Paint, I'm a-Leavin' Cheyenne"
- Tex Ritter - "Get A Horse and Saddle"
- The Texas Tornadoes - "I'm A Natural Born Cowboy"
- Tex Ritter with The Texas Tornadoes - "Sing, Cowboy, Sing"

== Critical reception ==
Variety described the film as a "rubber-stamp western" that stood out from similar films through its use of comedy and humor, and for some of the performances. The reviewer complimented the director for highlighting the characterizations of the supporting cast, notably Al St. John and Robert McKenzie, rather than focussing on the romantic storyline, although Louise Stanley, as the "love interest" was recognised for performing "with restraint."
