= Tex Rides with the Boy Scouts =

1937 film

- Film poster
- Directed by: Ray Taylor
- Written by: Edmond Kelso; Lindsley Parsons
- Produced by: Edward Finney
- Starring: Tex Ritter; Marjorie Reynolds
- Cinematography: Gus Peterson
- Edited by: Frederick Bain
- Music by: Frank Sanucci
- Distributed by: Grand National Pictures
- Release date: November 26, 1937
- Running time: 66 minutes
- Country: United States
- Language: English

Tex Rides with the Boy Scouts is a 1937 American Western film directed by Ray Taylor and starring singing cowboy Tex Ritter and Troop 13 Los Angeles District Boy Scouts of America. The film was shot in Old Kernville, California and premiered on Broadway in November 26, 1937.

== Plot ==
The film opens with a tribute to the Boy Scouts of America with footage of their first Jamboree in Washington, D.C., and an appearance by Robert Baden-Powell.

The scene switches to the robbery of a train carrying $1,000,000 in gold by a gang of outlaws, who hide out at an abandoned gold mine before they attempt to take the gold across the border into Mexico. Tex Ritter and his two sidekicks are warned off from the mine, but join the nearby camp of a troop of Boy Scouts who are impressed when Tex informs them that he was a Boy Scout and shows them his Silver Beaver Award. Tex and his sidekicks investigate the robbery, then, helped by the Scouts, recovers the gold and brings the gang to justice.

== Cast ==
- Tex Ritter – Tex Collins
- Forrest Taylor – Dorman
- Marjorie Reynolds – Norma Willis
- Horace Murphy – Stubby
- Snub Pollard – Pee Wee
- Tommy Bupp – Buzzy Willis
- Charles King – Bert Stark
- Karl Hackett – Newt Kemp
- Lynton Brent – Pete
- Philip Ahn – Sing Fung
- The Beverly Hillbillies – Themselves
- Members of Troop 13 Los Angeles District Boy Scouts of America – Themselves

== Soundtrack ==
- Red River Valley
  - Performed by the Beverly Hillbillies
- I'm Headin' For My Texas Home
  - Sung by Tex Ritter
- The Gal I Left Behind Me
  - Sung by Tex Ritter with the Beverly Hillbillies

== See also ==
- Drum Taps
