= Thunder in the Desert =

1938 film by Sam Newfield

- Directed by: Sam Newfield
- Screenplay by: George H. Plympton
- Story by: George H. Plympton
- Produced by: A. W. Hackel
- Starring: Bob Steele; Louise Stanley; Don Barclay; Ed Brady; Charles King; Horace Murphy
- Cinematography: Robert E. Cline
- Edited by: S. Roy Luby
- Production company: Supreme Pictures
- Distributed by: Republic Pictures
- Release date: March 7, 1938
- Running time: 56 minutes
- Country: United States
- Language: English

Thunder in the Desert is a 1938 American Western film directed by Sam Newfield, written by George H. Plympton, and starring Bob Steele, Louise Stanley, Don Barclay, Ed Brady, Charles King and Horace Murphy. It was released on March 7, 1938, by Republic Pictures.

== Cast ==
- Bob Steele as Bob Radford
- Louise Stanley as Betty Andrews
- Don Barclay as Rusty
- Ed Brady as Reno
- Charles King as Curt Harris
- Horace Murphy as Sheriff
- Steve Clark as Andrews
- Lew Meehan as Henchman Mike
- Ernie Adams as Tramp
- Richard Cramer as Tramp
- Budd Buster as Deputy Oscar
