= Paroled – To Die =

1938 film by Sam Newfield

Paroled - To Die
- Theatrical release poster
- Directed by: Sam Newfield
- Screenplay by: George H. Plympton
- Story by: Harry F. Olmsted
- Produced by: A. W. Hackel
- Starring: Bob Steele; Kathleen Eliot; Karl Hackett; Horace Murphy; Steve Clark; Budd Buster
- Cinematography: Robert E. Cline
- Edited by: S. Roy Luby
- Production company: Supreme Pictures Corporation
- Distributed by: Republic Pictures
- Release date: January 11, 1938
- Running time: 55 minutes
- Country: United States
- Language: English

Paroled – To Die is a 1938 American Western film, directed by Sam Newfield and written by George H. Plympton. The film stars Bob Steele, Kathleen Eliot, Karl Hackett, Horace Murphy, Steve Clark, and Budd Buster. It was released on January 11, 1938, by Republic Pictures.

== Plot ==
Harvey Meline is a con-man who is using money from his own bank to drill an oil well, then one day he finds Doug Redfern's bandana and has his gang rob his own bank, while blaming it on Doug (who used his bandana). Doug gets convicted and is eventually paroled, but Meline's plans don't stop there.

== Cast ==
- Bob Steele as Doug Redfern
- Kathleen Eliot as Joan Blackman
- Karl Hackett as Harvey Meline
- Horace Murphy as Lucky Gosden
- Steve Clark as Sheriff Blackman
- Budd Buster as Henchman Spike Travers
- James Sheridan as Henchman Matson
- Frank Ball as Judge
- Jack C. Smith as Prosecuting Attorney
