= Durango Valley Raiders =

1938 film by Sam Newfield

- Theatrical release poster
- Directed by: Sam Newfield
- Screenplay by: George H. Plympton
- Story by: Harry F. Olmsted
- Produced by: A. W. Hackel
- Starring: Bob Steele; Louise Stanley; Karl Hackett; Ted Adams; Forrest Taylor; Steve Clark
- Cinematography: Robert E. Cline
- Edited by: S. Roy Luby
- Production company: Supreme Pictures Corporation
- Distributed by: Republic Pictures
- Release date: August 22, 1938
- Running time: 55 minutes
- Country: United States
- Language: English

Durango Valley Raiders is a 1938 American Western film directed by Sam Newfield and written by George H. Plympton. The film stars Bob Steele, Louise Stanley, Karl Hackett, Ted Adams, Forrest Taylor and Steve Clark. The film was released on August 22, 1938, by Republic Pictures.

== Plot ==
Durango Valley is controlled by Shadow and his gang. The Sheriff while investigating a killing, arrests ranch worker Keene Cordner, with some help Keene gets out of jail and hides out, but will now become an actual bandit, in the hopes of catching Shadow.

== Cast ==
- Bob Steele as Keene Cordner
- Louise Stanley as Betty McKay
- Karl Hackett as John McKay
- Ted Adams as Lobo
- Forrest Taylor as Sheriff Devlin
- Steve Clark as Boone Cordner
- Horace Murphy as Matt Tanner
- Jack Ingram as Deputy Slade
