= Down the Wyoming Trail =

1939 film

- Directed by: Albert Herman (as Al Herman)
- Screenplay by: Peter Dixon; Roger Merton
- Story by: Peter Dixon; Roger Merton
- Produced by: Edward Finney (as Edward F. Finney)
- Starring: Tex Ritter
- Cinematography: Marcel Le Picard
- Edited by: Holbrook N. Todd
- Music by: Frank Sanucci
- Color process: Black and white
- Production company: Edward F. Finney Productions
- Distributed by: Monogram Pictures
- Release date: June 14, 1939
- Running time: 56 minutes
- Country: United States
- Language: English

Down the Wyoming Trail is a 1939 American Western film directed by Albert Herman (as Al Herman) and starring Tex Ritter.

== Cast ==
- Tex Ritter as Tex Yancey
- White Flash as Tex's Horse
- Horace Murphy as Sheriff Missouri
- Mary Brodel as Candy Parker
- Bobby Larson as Jerry Parker
- Charles King as George Red Becker
- Bob Terry as Blackie
- Jack Ingram as Henchman Monte
- Earl Douglas as Henchman Silent Smith
- Frank LaRue as McClellan
- Ernie Adams as Limpy Watkins
- Charles Sargent as Ted Kern
- Edward Coxen as Whiskers (as Ed Coxen)
- Jean Sothern as Waitress Hilda
- The Northwesterners as Musicians
- Merle Scobee as Northwesterners Band Member
- A.J. Brier as Northwesterners Band Member
- Wilson F. Rasch as Northwesterners Band Member
- Ray Scobee as Northwesterners Band Member
- Charles L. Davis as Northwesterners Band Member

== Soundtrack ==
- Tex Ritter – "It Makes No Difference Now" (Written by Jimmie Davis and Floyd Tillman)
- Tex Ritter – "In Elk Valley" (Written by Johnny Lange and Lew Porter)
- Tex Ritter – "Goin' Back to Texas" (Written by Carson Robison)
- "Silent Night"
- "Oh, Little Town of Bethlehem"
- "He Looks so Peaceful Now"
