= The Golden Trail (1940 film) =

1940 film

- Directed by: Albert Herman
- Written by: Roland Lynch; Robert Emmett Tansey; Roger Merton
- Produced by: Edward Finney
- Starring: Tex Ritter; Stanley Price; Gene Alsace
- Cinematography: Marcel Le Picard
- Edited by: Robert Golden
- Music by: Frank Sanucci
- Production company: Edward F. Finney Productions
- Distributed by: Monogram Pictures
- Release date: July 8, 1940
- Running time: 52 minutes
- Country: United States
- Language: English

The Golden Trail is a 1940 American Western film directed by Albert Herman and starring Tex Ritter, Stanley Price and Gene Alsace.

== Cast ==
- Tex Ritter as Tex Roberts
- Slim Andrews as Slim Hunkafeller
- Inna Gest as Chita Rawls
- Patsy Moran as Patsy
- Gene Alsace as Sheriff Bat Toles
- Stanley Price as Prader - aka Ceegareet
- Warner Richmond as Henchman Chris
- Eddie Dean as Henchman Bart
- Forrest Taylor as Bill Rawls
- Frank LaRue as Deputy
- Bill Wells as Texas Bill - Mayor of Boomtown
- Ernie Adams as Hank Rivers

== Bibliography ==
- Bernard A. Drew. Motion Picture Series and Sequels: A Reference Guide. Routledge, 2013.
