= Land of Fighting Men =

1938 film by Alan James

- Theatrical release poster
- Directed by: Alan James
- Screenplay by: Joseph O'Donnell
- Story by: Stanley Roberts
- Produced by: Maurice Conn
- Starring: Jack Randall; Bruce Bennett; Louise Stanley; Dick Jones; Walt Shrum; Bob Burns
- Cinematography: Robert E. Cline
- Edited by: Richard G. Wray
- Production company: Conn Pictures Corporation
- Distributed by: Monogram Pictures
- Release date: March 11, 1938
- Running time: 53 minutes
- Country: United States
- Language: English

Land of Fighting Men is a 1938 American Western film directed by Alan James and written by Joseph O'Donnell. The film stars Jack Randall, Bruce Bennett, Louise Stanley, Dick Jones, Walt Shrum and Bob Burns. The film was released on March 11, 1938, by Monogram Pictures.

== Plot ==
Cowboy Jack Lambert is accused of murdering a rancher, now in order to prove his innocence he has to find the real killer.

== Cast ==
- Jack Randall as Jack Lambert
- Bruce Bennett as Fred Mitchell
- Louise Stanley as Connie Mitchell
- Dick Jones as Jimmy Mitchell
- Walt Shrum as Walt
- Bob Burns as Sheriff
- Wheeler Oakman as Wallace
- John Merton as Flint
- Lane Chandler as Cliff
- Rex Lease as Ed
- Ernie Adams as Slim
