= Pinto Canyon =

- Theatrical release poster
- Directed by: Raymond K. Johnson
- Screenplay by: Carl Krusada
- Produced by: Harry S. Webb
- Starring: Bob Steele; Louise Stanley; Kenne Duncan; Ted Adams; Steve Clark; Budd Buster
- Cinematography: Edward A. Kull; William Hyer
- Edited by: Fred Bain
- Music by: Frank Sanucci
- Production company: Metropolitan Pictures
- Distributed by: Monogram Pictures
- Release date: May 1, 1940
- Running time: 55 minutes
- Country: United States
- Language: English

Pinto Canyon is a 1940 American Western film directed by Raymond K. Johnson and written by Carl Krusada. The film stars Bob Steele, Louise Stanley, Kenne Duncan, Ted Adams, Steve Clark and Budd Buster. The film was released on May 1, 1940, by Monogram Pictures.

== Cast ==
- Bob Steele as Bob Hall
- Louise Stanley as Helen Jones
- Kenne Duncan as Fred Jones
- Ted Adams as Jim Farley
- Steve Clark as Hardy Kellar
- Budd Buster as Bill Kellar
- Murdock MacQuarrie as Elmer Barnes
- George Chesebro as Pete Childers
- Carl Mathews as Clem
- Jimmy Aubrey as George
