= Lawless Land =

1937 film

- Directed by: Albert Ray
- Written by: Andrew Bennison (story); Andrew Bennison (adaptation and screenplay)
- Produced by: A.W. Hackel (producer)
- Starring: See below
- Cinematography: Jack Greenhalgh
- Edited by: S. Roy Luby
- Distributed by: Republic Pictures
- Release date: April 6, 1937
- Running time: 60 minutes 55 minutes (American Alpha Video Print)
- Country: United States
- Language: English

Lawless Land is a 1937 American Western film directed by Albert Ray and starring Johnny Mack Brown and Louise Stanley. Originally made by Supreme Pictures in 1936, it was released by Republic Pictures the following year.

== Cast ==
- Johnny Mack Brown as Ranger Jeff Hayden
- Louise Stanley as Letty Winston
- Ted Adams as Clay Wheeler
- Julian Rivero as Henchman Ortego
- Horace Murphy as Storekeeper Lafe Spooner
- Frank Ball as Saloon owner Bill
- Ed Cassidy as Sheriff Jim
- Anita Camargo as Lolita

== Soundtrack ==
- The Chiquita Hernandez Orchestra "La Cacuracha"
