= Where the Buffalo Roam (1938 film) =

1938 film by Albert Herman (as Al Herman)

- Theatrical release poster
- Directed by: Albert Herman (as Al Herman)
- Screenplay by: Robert Emmett Tansey (as Robert Emmett)
- Story by: Robert Emmett Tansey (as Robert Emmett)
- Produced by: Edward Finney
- Starring: Tex Ritter
- Cinematography: Francis Corby
- Edited by: Frederick Bain
- Music by: Frank Sanucci
- Color process: Black and white
- Production company: Edward F. Finney Productions
- Distributed by: Monogram Pictures
- Release date: October 12, 1938
- Running time: 61 minutes
- Country: United States
- Language: English

Where the Buffalo Roam is a 1938 American Western film directed by Albert Herman (as Al Herman) and starring Tex Ritter.

== Plot ==
Tex returns to Santa Fe to find his Mother murdered. Foster runs the town and all crimes committed by his gang are blamed on Rogel and his men. He makes Tex Marshal but this backfires when Tex enlists Rogel and his men and goes after Foster who he now knows is responsible for his Mother's death.

== Cast ==
- Tex Ritter as Tex Houston
- Dorothy Short as Laddie Gray
- Horace Murphy as Ananias
- "Snub" Pollard as Pee Wee (as Peewee Pollard)
- John Merton as Foster
- Richard Alexander as Sellers (as Dick Alexander)
- Karl Hackett as Three-Finger Rogell
- Dave O'Brien as Jeff Gray
- Bob Terry as Rogell-Rider Shifty
- Ed Cassidy as Hodge
- Charles King as Henchman Bull (as Chas. King Jr.)
- Ernie Adams as Henchman Bert / Stage Passenger
- Jack C. Smith as Square-Dance Caller (as Jack Smith)
- Victor Adamson as Stagecoach Shotgun Guard (as Denver Dixon)
- Louise Massey as Louise Massey, Westerners Band Leader.
- The Westerners as Musicians

== Soundtrack ==
- Tex Ritter - "Where the Buffalo Roam" (Written by Frank Harford, Frank Sanucci and Tex Ritter)
- Tex Ritter - "Troubador of the Prairie" (Written by Frank Harford and Tex Ritter)
- Louise Massey and The Westerners - "In the Heart of the Prairie" (Written by Louise Massey and J. Woodruff Smith *Louise Massey and The Westerners1 - "Bunkhouse Jamboree" (Written by Louise Massey and Larry Wellington)
- Tex Ritter - "Longside of the Sana Fe Trail"
- Tex Ritter - "Home on the Range"
- Tex Ritter - "Shoot the Buffalo"

== See also ==
- Public domain film
- List of American films of 1938
- List of films in the public domain in the United States
