= Riders of the Rockies =

- Theatrical release poster
- Directed by: Robert North Bradbury
- Screenplay by: Robert Emmett Tansey; Norman Leslie
- Produced by: Lindsley Parsons
- Starring: Tex Ritter; Louise Stanley; Horace Murphy; Snub Pollard; Earl Dwire; Charles King
- Cinematography: Gus Peterson
- Edited by: Fred Bain
- Music by: Frank Sanucci
- Production companies: Boots and Saddles Pictures
- Distributed by: Grand National Films
- Release date: July 2, 1937
- Running time: 56 minutes
- Country: United States
- Language: English

Riders of the Rockies is a 1937 American Western film directed by Robert North Bradbury and written by Robert Emmett Tansey and Norman Leslie. The film stars Tex Ritter, Louise Stanley, Horace Murphy, Snub Pollard, Earl Dwire and Charles King. The film was released on July 2, 1937, by Grand National Films Inc.

Despite the song and title, the film takes place on the Arizona/Mexico border and not the Rockies.

== Plot ==
Arizona Rangers Tex Rand, Doc Thornton and Pee Wee McDougal are posted to the border post at Desert Wells to combat a group of rustlers taking cattle across the Mexican border. The rustlers manage to falsely implicate the three for being in cahoots with the rustlers, leading to their arrest. Tex and the others break jail to team up with the Ruraless to bring justice to both nations.

== Cast ==
- Tex Ritter as Tex Rand
- Louise Stanley as Louise Rogers
- Horace Murphy as Doc Thornton
- Snub Pollard as Pee Wee McDougall
- Earl Dwire as Jeff Jeffries
- Charles King as Butch Regan
- Yakima Canutt as Sergeant Beef
- Martin Garralaga as Captain Mendoza
- Jack Rockwell as Captain Reyes
