= Man from Texas (1939 film) =

1939 film

- Directed by: Albert Herman
- Written by: Robert Emmett Tansey
- Produced by: Edward Finney
- Starring: Tex Ritter; Ruth Rogers; Hal Price
- Cinematography: Marcel Le Picard
- Edited by: Fred Bain
- Music by: Frank Sanucci
- Production company: Edward F. Finney Productions
- Distributed by: Monogram Pictures
- Release date: April 19, 1939
- Running time: 56 minutes
- Country: United States
- Language: English

Man from Texas is a 1939 American Western film directed by Albert Herman and starring Tex Ritter, Ruth Rogers and Hal Price.

== Cast ==
- Tex Ritter as Tex Allen
- Ruth Rogers as Laddie Dennison
- Hal Price as Marshal 'Happy' Jack Martin
- Charles B. Wood as Shooting Kid
- Kenne Duncan as Speed Dennison
- Vic Demourelle as Jeff Hall
- Roy Barcroft as Henchman Drifter
- Frank Wayne as Henchman Longhorn
- Tom London as Henchman Slim
- Chuck Baldra as Deputy
- Walter Wilson as Walt
- Victor Adamson as Dennison Cowhand
- White Flash the horse as White Flash

== Bibliography ==
- Bond, Johnny. The Tex Ritter Story. Chappell Music Company, 1976.
