= Arizona Days (1937 film) =

- Film poster
- Directed by: John English
- Written by: Lindsley Parsons (story); Sherman L. Lowe (screenplay)
- Produced by: Edward Finney
- Starring: Tex Ritter; Eleanor Stewart; Syd Saylor
- Cinematography: Gus Peterson
- Edited by: Frederick Bain
- Music by: Frank Sanucci
- Production companies: Boots and Saddles Pictures
- Distributed by: Grand National Pictures
- Release date: January 30, 1937
- Running time: 57 minutes
- Country: United States
- Language: English

Arizona Days is a 1937 American Western film directed by John English and starring Tex Ritter, Eleanor Stewart, Syd Saylor. It is the third Western singing cowboy Ritter made for producer Edward Finney for Grand National Pictures. Many public domain prints are missing sequences from the original release.

== Plot ==
Tex and his sidekick "Grass" Hopper are delighted to join a traveling music show. When a group of cowboys come in without paying, Tex steps down from the stage, pulls his six gun and holds the audience up until the manager points out the men who did not pay their admission fee. After seeing the way Tex gathers revenue from cheats, the County commissioner offers Tex a job as a tax collector.

== Cast ==
- Tex Ritter as Tex Malinson
- Syd Saylor as Claude "Grass" Hopper
- William Faversham as Professor McGill
- Eleanor Stewart as Marge Workman
- Forrest Taylor as Harry Price
- Snub Pollard as Cookie
- Tommy Bupp as Billy Workman
- Glenn Strange as Henchman Pete
- Budd Buster as Sheriff Ed Higginbotham
- Salty Holmes as Harmonica Player
- William Desmond
- Earl Dwire

== Soundtrack ==
- High, Wide and Handsome
  - Written by Tex Ritter and Ted Choate
  - Sung by Tex Ritter
- Tombstone, Arizona
  - Written by Tex Ritter and Jack C. Smith
  - Sung by Tex Ritter
- Arizona Days
  - Written by Tex Ritter and Jack C. Smith
  - Sung by Tex Ritter
- If Love Were Mine
  - Written by Frank Sanucci
  - Sung by Ethelind Terry
