= The Mystery of the Hooded Horsemen =

1937 film

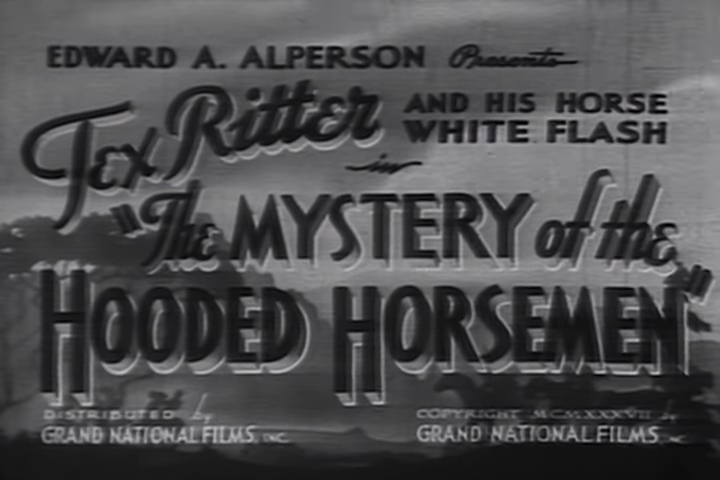
- Title Card
- Directed by: Ray Taylor
- Written by: Edmond Kelso (story); Edmond Kelso (screenplay)
- Produced by: Edward Finney (producer); Lindsley Parsons (supervising producer)
- Starring: See below
- Cinematography: Gus Peterson
- Edited by: Frederick Bain
- Music by: Frank Sanucci
- Distributed by: Grand National Pictures
- Release date: August 6, 1937
- Running time: 60 minutes
- Country: United States
- Language: English

The Mystery of the Hooded Horsemen is a 1937 American Western film directed by Ray Taylor. It was singing cowboy Tex Ritter's eighth film for Grand National Pictures. While the film had an original copyright notice, its copyright was not renewed, so it has entered the public domain.

== Plot ==
Full film (public domain)

Tex and Stubby keep their promise to a dying friend by helping his partner hold on to his gold mine, and to avenge his death by taking on and wiping out a horde of masked riders.

== Cast ==
- Tex Ritter as Tex Martin
- White Flash as Tex's horse
- Iris Meredith as Nancy Wilson
- Horace Murphy as Stubby
- Charles King as Blackie Devlin
- Earl Dwire as Sheriff Walker
- Forrest Taylor as Norton
- Joseph W. Girard as Dan Farley
- Lafe McKee as Tom Wilson
- Hank Worden as Deputy
- Ray Whitley as Band Leader
- The Range Ramblers as Saloon musicians

== Soundtrack ==
- Tex Ritter - "Ride, Ride, Ride" (Written by Fred Rose and Michael David)
- Tex Ritter - "I'm a Texas Cowboy"
- Tex Ritter - "Ride Around Little Dogies"
- Tex Ritter - "Rosita"
- Tex Ritter - "A'Ridin' Old Paint"
