= Trouble in Texas =

1937 film by Robert N. Bradbury (as R.N. Bradbury)

- Theatrical release poster
- Directed by: Robert N. Bradbury (R.N. Bradbury)
- Screenplay by: Robert Emmett Tansey (as Robert Emmett)
- Story by: Lindsley Parsons
- Produced by: Edward Finney (as Edward F. Finney)
- Starring: Tex Ritter; White Flash; Rita Hayworth; Yakima Canutt
- Cinematography: Gus Peterson
- Edited by: Fred Bain
- Music by: Frank Sanucci
- Color process: Black and white
- Production companies: Boots and Saddles Pictures
- Distributed by: Grand National Pictures
- Release date: March 6, 1937
- Running time: 63 minutes
- Country: United States
- Language: English

Trouble in Texas is a 1937 American Western film directed by Robert N. Bradbury (as R.N. Bradbury) and starring Tex Ritter, his horse White Flash, Rita Hayworth (billed as "Rita Cansino") and Yakima Canutt. The supporting cast features Earl Dwire and Glenn Strange. The film was a remake of Bradbury's The Man from Utah.

== Plot ==
Many Middleton Rodeo winning cowboys are murdered or disappear, one being Tex Masters' brother. Tex teams up with undercover policewoman Carmen Serano for justice and vengeance.

== Cast ==
- Tex Ritter as Tex Masters
- White Flash as Tex's horse
- Rita Hayworth as Carmen Serano (billed as "Rita Cansino")
- Yakima Canutt as Henchman Squint Palmer
- Charles King as Henchman Pinto
- Horace Murphy as Sidekick Lucky
- Earl Dwire as Barker
- Tex Cooper as Rodeo Announcer
- Hal Price as Federal Officer
- Glenn Strange as Middleton Sheriff
- Jack C. Smith as Banker Bix
- The Texas Tornadoes as Musicians

== Soundtrack ==
- Tex Ritter - "Down the Colorado Trail" (Written by Rudy Sooter as Rudolph Sooter)
- Tex Ritter with Rudy Sooter and Texas Tornados Band - "The Rodeo Song" (Written by Tex Ritter and Frank Sanucci)
- Rudy Sooter with the Texas Tornados Band - "The Cowboy Band" (Written by Rudy Sooter as Rudolph Sooter)
- Tex Ritter with Rudy Sooter and Texas Tornados Band - "A Cowboy's Lament" (Traditional)
