= Louise Stanley =

American actress

- Born: Louise Keyes; January 28, 1915; Springfield, Illinois, U.S.
- Died: December 28, 1982 (aged 67); Cocoa Beach, Florida, U.S.
- Occupation: Film actress
- Years active: 1936–1944
- Spouse(s): Dennis O'Keefe (1937–1938); Addison Randall (?–1941); Charles Munn (1942–1944)

Louise Stanley (born Louise Keyes; January 28, 1915 – December 28, 1982) was an American actress.

== Early years ==
Born in Springfield, Illinois, Keyes was the daughter of Alvin Keyes, who was assistant director of the Illinois State Department of Public Safety. She changed her name to Stanley when she decided to embark on an acting career.

== Film ==
Although obtaining many minor roles, her career never lifted her to major stardom, but she did star in roughly twenty-four B-movies during her short career, most of which were B-Westerns. In 1935 she signed a contract with Paramount, which was not renewed after the initial six months. She then began working for Warner Bros., and was from time to time "loaned out" for use in Westerns. In 1937 she was cast in the leading role, starring alongside Tex Ritter, in the Western Riders of the Rockies, directed by Robert N. Bradbury.

Also in 1937, she began working for Columbia Pictures, where she made two films starring alongside Charley Chase and Andy Clyde. In 1939 she starred in The Oregon Trail, starring alongside Johnny Mack Brown. She starred in several films with cowboy star Bob Steele and others with Ritter.

== Personal life ==
Stanley's first husband was NBC stage announcer Leland "Lee" Hunt Bennett. They married at Cook County, Illinois on March 29, 1934 and divorced in 1936.

She then married actor, writer and film director Dennis O'Keefe. They married on March 10, 1937 and divorced on August 12, 1938.

Following the end of this marriage, Stanley married Addison Randall, a singing cowboy and romantic lead for many B-Westerns. She and Randall divorced, then remarried. The second marriage between the two ended after Randall became involved in an affair with actress Louise Brooks.

On August 25, 1942, Stanley married U.S. Navy pilot Charles Munn Jr. This marriage also was short-lived, ending in divorce with allegations of spousal abuse.

Louise Stanley retired from acting and died from cancer in Cocoa Beach, Florida in 1982.

== Partial filmography ==
- Fugitive in the Sky (Unbilled) (1936)
- Lawless Land (1937)
- Sing, Cowboy, Sing (1937)
- Riders of the Rockies (1937)
- Gun Packer (1938)
- Durango Valley Raiders (1938)
- Thunder in the Desert (1938)
- Danger on the Air (1938)
- The Oregon Trail (1939)
- Yukon Flight (1940)
- Pinto Canyon (1940)
- Sky Bandits (1940)
- The Cheyenne Kid (1940)
