= Riders of the Black Hills =

1938 film

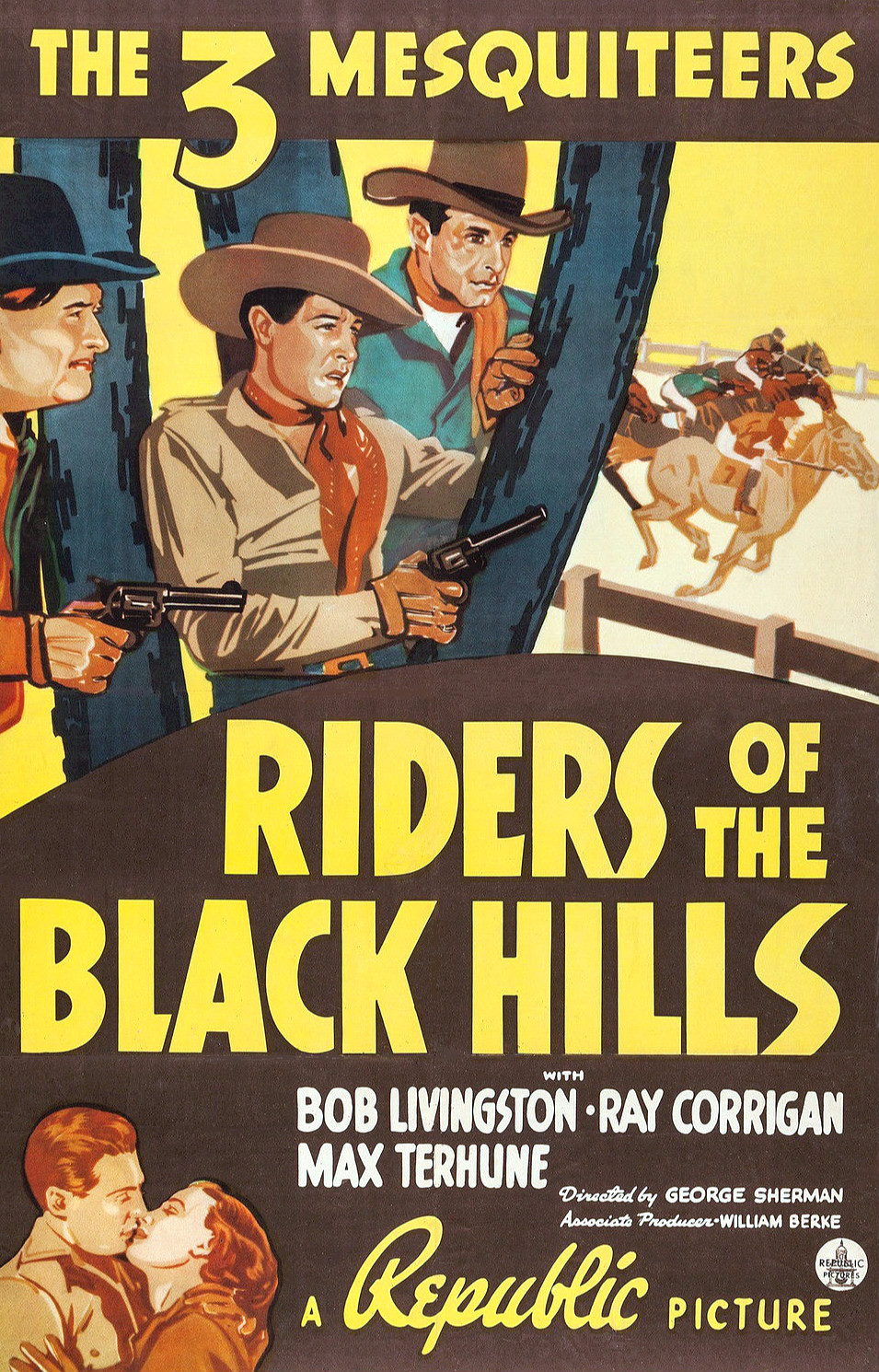
- Theatrical release poster
- Directed by: George Sherman
- Written by: William Colt MacDonald; Betty Burbridge; Bernard McConville
- Produced by: William Berke
- Starring: Robert Livingston; Ray Corrigan; Max Terhune
- Cinematography: William Nobles
- Edited by: Lester Orlebeck
- Music by: Alberto Colombo
- Distributed by: Republic Pictures
- Release date: June 15, 1938
- Running time: 55 minutes
- Country: United States
- Language: English

Riders of the Black Hills is a 1938 American Western "Three Mesquiteers" B-movie directed by George Sherman and starring Robert Livingston, Ray Corrigan, and Max Terhune.

== Cast ==
- Robert Livingston as Stony Brooke
- Ray Corrigan as Tucson Smith
- Max Terhune as Lullaby Joslin
- Ann Evers as Joyce Garth
- Roscoe Ates as Sheriff Brown (as Rosco Ates)
- Maude Eburne as Mrs. Peggy Garth
- Frank Melton as Don Weston
- Johnny Lang Fitzgerald as Jockey Buck
- Jack Ingram as Henchman Lefty
- John P. Wade as Ed Harvey, Horse Trader
- Edward Earle as Race Track Steward
- Monte Montague as Deputy Sam
