= Ann Evers =

American actress

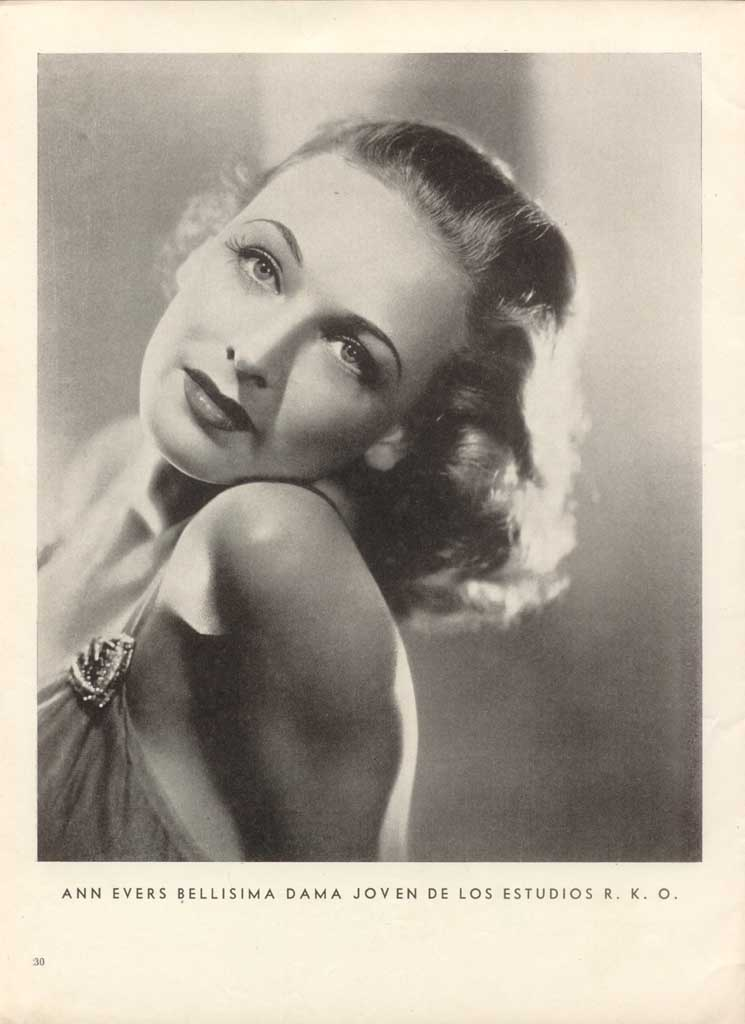
- Evers in 1939
- Born: September 6, 1915; Scranton, Pennsylvania, U.S.
- Died: June 4, 1987 (aged 71); Edison, New Jersey, U.S.
- Occupation: Actress
- Years active: 1936–1944
- Spouse: Seton I. Miller (m. 1946; died 1974)
- Children: 1

Ann Evers (September 6, 1915 – June 4, 1987) was an American film actress. She played the female lead in several B westerns, but largely appeared in supporting roles. She was married to the screenwriter Seton I. Miller.

== Selected filmography ==
- Too Many Parents (1936)
- Hollywood Boulevard (1936)
- Forgotten Faces (1936)
- Anything for a Thrill (1937)
- Frontier Town (1938)
- Riders of the Black Hills (1938)
- The Mad Miss Manton (1938)
- Hawk of the Wilderness (1938)
- If I Were King (1938)
- Next Time I Marry (1938)
- Beauty for the Asking (1939)
- Police Bullets (1942)
- She Has What It Takes (1943)
- Casanova Brown (1944)

== Bibliography ==
- Langman, Larry & Finn, Daniel. A Guide to American Crime Films of the Thirties. Greenwood Press, 1995.
- Oduka, Ted. Grand National, Producers Releasing Corporation, and Screen Guild/Lippert: Complete Filmographies with Studio Histories. McFarland & Company, 1989.
- Rothel, David. The Singing Cowboys. A.S. Barnes, 1978.
