= Buffalo Bill in Tomahawk Territory =

1952 film

- Film poster
- Directed by: Bernard B. Ray
- Written by: Sam Neuman; Nat Tanchuck
- Produced by: Edward Finney; Bernard B. Ray; Jack Schwarz
- Starring: Clayton Moore
- Cinematography: Elmer Dyer
- Music by: Frank Sanucci
- Production company: Jack Schwarz Productions
- Distributed by: United Artists
- Release date: 1952
- Running time: 66 minutes
- Country: United States
- Language: English

Buffalo Bill in Tomahawk Territory is a 1952 Western film directed by Bernard B. Ray, produced by Edward Finney and starring Clayton Moore as Buffalo Bill.

== Plot ==
Buffalo Bill is sent by the government to bring cattle to the Sioux chief White Cloud.A group of white men have discovered gold and dress like Indians to attack wagon trains to destroy the peace.

== Cast ==
- Clayton Moore as Buffalo Bill Cody
- Slim Andrews as Cactus
- Charles Harvey as Lieutenant Bryan
- Rodd Redwing as Running Deer
- Chief Yowlachie as Chief White Cloud
- Chief Thundercloud as Black Hawk
- Merrill McCormick as Rider (uncredited)
