= Danger on the Air =

1938 film by Otis Garrett

- Directed by: Otis Garrett
- Screenplay by: Betty Laidlaw; Robert Lively
- Based on: Death Catches Up with Mr. Kluck by Xantippe
- Produced by: Irving Starr
- Starring: Nan Grey; Donald Woods; Jed Prouty; Berton Churchill; William Lundigan
- Cinematography: Stanley Cortez
- Edited by: Maurice Wright
- Production companies: Crime Club Productions, Inc.
- Distributed by: Universal Pictures Co.
- Release date: July 1, 1938
- Country: United States

Danger on the Air is a 1938 American mystery film directed by Otis Garrett. The film was based on the novel Death Catches Up with Mr. Kluck by author Xanthippe.

== Plot ==
Christina "Steenie" MacCorkle, a radio advertising executive, is suspected of murdering her client as Caesar Kluck, a soda magnate.

Loathed by all who met him, or forced to work, with his underhanded business machinations, the victims, and suspects, start piling up. Including gangster Joe Carney and janitor Tony Lisotti, who is trying to protect his daughter, Maria Lisotti, from being another notch on Kluck's belt, and Harry Lake, who is desperate to get on the air, seemingly at any cost.

== Cast ==
- Nan Grey as Christina "Steenie" MacCorkle
- Donald Woods as Benjamin Franklin Butts
- Jed Prouty as Harry Jones, Radio Company Boss
- Berton Churchill as Caesar Kluck
- William Lundigan as Dave Chapman, Radio Announcer
- Richard "Skeets" Gallagher as Finney Fish, Ad Company Man
- Edward Van Sloan as Dr. Leonard Sylvester, Charlatan
- George Meeker as Tuttle, Undercover FCC Man
- Frank Milan as Alexander MacCorkle
- Lee J. Cobb as Tony Lisotti
- Johnny Arthur as Aiken
- Peter Lind Hayes as Harry Lake, Call Boy and Aspiring Performer
- Louise Stanley as Maria Lisotti
- Eloise Rawitzer as Miss Mildred Bello
- Joe Downing as Gangster Joe Carney

== Production ==
Danger on the Air was based on The Crime Club novel Death Catches Up with Mr. Kluck by Xantippe (pseudonym of actress and radio scriptwriter Edith Meiser). Production on the film began in mid May 1938.

== Release ==
Danger on the Air was released on July 1, 1938, by Universal Studios.

== Reception ==
From retrospective reviews, the authors of Universal Horrors declared the film to be "One of the better Crime Club entries" noting that "Nan Grey contributes a particularly ingratiating performance."
