= Billy the Kid Returns =

1938 film by Joseph Kane

- Theatrical release poster
- Directed by: Joseph Kane
- Written by: Jack Natteford (original screenplay)
- Produced by: Charles E. Ford (associate producer)
- Starring: Roy Rogers
- Cinematography: Ernest Miller
- Edited by: Lester Orlebeck
- Music by: William Lava
- Distributed by: Republic Pictures
- Release date: September 4, 1938
- Running time: 53 minutes
- Country: United States
- Language: English

Billy the Kid Returns is a 1938 American Western film directed by Joseph Kane and starring Roy Rogers.

== Plot ==
Following the shooting of Billy the Kid by his former friend Sheriff Pat Garrett, lookalike deputy sheriff Roy Rogers, assisted by travelling musical instrument salesman Frog Millhouse, takes his place to defend the honest settlers of Lincoln County, New Mexico, from evil ranchers.

== Cast ==
- Roy Rogers as Roy Rogers / Billy the Kid
- Smiley Burnette as Frog Millhouse
- Lynne Roberts as Ellen Moore
- Morgan Wallace as J. B. Morganson
- Fred Kohler as Matson
- Wade Boteler as Sheriff Pat Garrett
- Edwin Stanley as Nathaniel Moore
- Horace Murphy as Mr. Miller - Homesteader
- Joseph Crehan as U.S. Marshal Dave Conway
- Robert Emmett Keane as Mr. Page

== Soundtrack ==
- Roy Rogers – "Born to the Saddle" (Written by Eddie Cherkose)
- Roy Rogers – "Trail Blazin'" (Written by Eddie Cherkose)
- Roy Rogers – "Save a Smile for a Rainy Day" (Written by Sid Robin and Foy Willing)
- Smiley Burnette – "Sing a Little Song About Anything" (Written by Smiley Burnette)
- Roy Rogers – "When I Camped Under the Stars" (Written by Tim Spencer)
- Roy Rogers – "When the Sun is Setting on the Prairie" (Written by Eddie Cherkose and Alberto Colombo)
