= Frontier Town (film) =

1937 film

- Directed by: Ray Taylor
- Written by: Edmond Kelso; Lindsley Parsons
- Produced by: Edward Finney; Lindsley Parsons
- Starring: Tex Ritter; Karl Hackett; Ann Evers
- Cinematography: Gus Peterson
- Edited by: Fred Bain
- Music by: Frank Sanucci
- Production companies: Boots and Saddles Pictures
- Distributed by: Grand National Pictures
- Release date: March 4, 1938
- Running time: 59 minutes
- Country: United States
- Language: English

Frontier Town is a 1938 American Western film directed by Ray Taylor and starring Tex Ritter, Karl Hackett and Ann Evers.

== Cast ==
- Tex Ritter as Tex Lansing, alias Tex Rawlins
- Ann Evers as Gail Hawthorne
- Horace Murphy as Stubby
- Snub Pollard as Peewee
- Karl Hackett as Nat Regan
- Charles King as Henchman Pete Denby
- Forrest Taylor as Sheriff Walsh of Frontier
- Ed Cassidy as Sheriff Jack Lane of Prairie City
- Marion Feducha as Bob Hawthorne
- Jack C. Smith as Pop Pearson
- Lynton Brent as Henchman Grayson
- White Flash as Flash, Tex's Horse

== Bibliography ==
- James Robert Parish & Michael R. Pitts. Film directors: a guide to their American films. Scarecrow Press, 1974.
