= Rollin' Plains =

1938 film

- Theatrical release poster
- Directed by: Albert Herman
- Written by: Jacques Jaccard (story) and Celia Jaccard (story); Lindsley Parsons (screenplay) and Edmond Kelso (screenplay)
- Produced by: Edward Finney (producer); Lindsley Parsons (supervising producer)
- Starring: Tex Ritter
- Cinematography: Gus Peterson
- Edited by: Frederick Bain
- Distributed by: Grand National Pictures
- Release date: July 8, 1938
- Running time: 57 minutes
- Country: United States
- Language: English

Rollin' Plains is a 1938 American Western film directed by Albert Herman.

== Plot ==
Texas Rangers Tex, Ananias and Pee Wee put down a range war between sheepmen and cattlemen.

== Cast ==
- Tex Ritter as Tex Lawrence
- White Flash as Tex's horse
- Horace Murphy as Ananias
- "Snub" Pollard as Pee Wee
- Harriet Bennet as Ruth Moody
- Hobart Bosworth as John "Gospel" Moody
- Ed Cassidy as Sheriff Tomlin
- Karl Hackett as Dan Barrow
- Charles King as Trigger Gargan
- Ernie Adams as Cain Moody
- Lynton Brent as Henchman Lope
- Horace B. Carpenter as Hank Tomlin
- The Beverly Hillbillies as Musicians

== Soundtrack ==
- Tex Ritter with The Beverly Hill Billies – "Me, My Pal and My Pony" (Written by Frank Harford)
- Tex Ritter – "Rollin' Plains" (Written by Walter G. Samuels, Leonard Whitcup and Teddy Powell)
