= The Utah Trail =

1938 film

- Film poster
- Directed by: Albert Herman
- Written by: Edmond Kelso (story and screenplay); Lindsley Parsons (story)
- Produced by: Edward Finney (producer)
- Starring: See below
- Cinematography: Francis Corby
- Edited by: Frederick Bain
- Distributed by: Grand National Films
- Release date: August 12, 1938
- Running time: 56 minutes
- Country: United States
- Language: English

The Utah Trail is a 1938 American Western film directed by Albert Herman. It was Tex Ritter's final film for Grand National Films. Despite the song and title, the film takes place on the Arizona/Mexico border and not Utah. The film is based on a short story that appeared in Ranch Romances magazine.

== Plot ==
Tex is asked by the owner of a railroad to investigate a ghost train. Upon his arrival with his friends Ananias and Pee Wee, they find the railroad is run by the owner's daughter Sally after the owner's murder. Sally wants no part of Tex, posing as "The Pecos Kid", but Tex and his friends track down the train being used by rustlers.

== Cast ==
- Tex Ritter as Tex Stewart, posing as the Pecos Kid
- White Flash as Tex's Horse
- Horace Murphy as Ananias
- "Snub" Pollard as Pee Wee
- Pamela Blake as Sally Jeffers
- Karl Hackett as Hiram Slaughter
- Charles King as Henchman Badger
- Ed Cassidy as Sheriff Clayton
- Dave O'Brien as Mason – Bookkeeper
- Bud Osborne as Henchman Hank
- Lynton Brent as Henchman Cheyenne
- Rudy Sooter as Bandleader / Singer
- The Texas Tornadoes as Saloon Band

== Soundtrack ==
- Tex Ritter – "Utah Trail" (Written by Bob Palmer)
- Tex Ritter – "Give Me Back My Saddle" (Written by Frank Harford)
- Tex Ritter – "A Mighty Good Horse" (Written by Frank Harford)
- Tex Ritter, Horace Murphy and "Snub" Pollard – "A'Roamin' I'll Be" (Written by Frank Harford)
- Rudy Sooter – "Won't You Be My Buckaroo?" (Written by Rudy Sooter)
