= Tex Ritter =

American country singer (1905–1974)

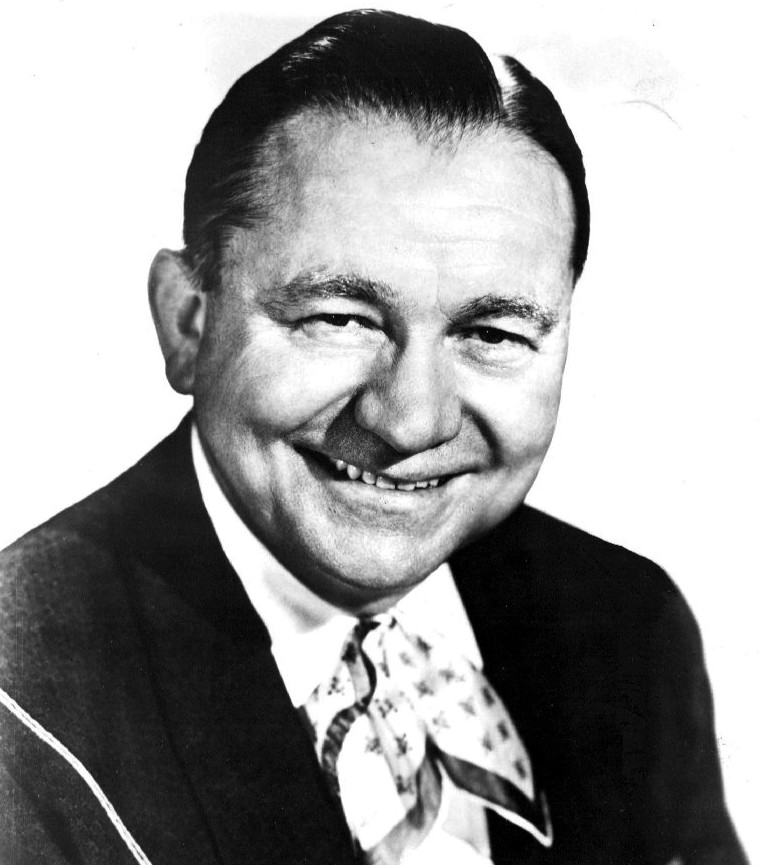
- Ritter in 1966

Background information
- Born: Woodward Maurice Ritter; January 12, 1905; Murvaul, Texas, U.S.
- Died: January 2, 1974 (aged 68) Nashville, Tennessee, U.S.
- Genre: Country
- Occupations: Singer; actor
- Years active: 1928–1973
- Labels: Columbia; Decca; Capitol
- Spouse: Dorothy Fay (m. 1941)

Woodward Maurice "Tex" Ritter (January 12, 1905 – January 2, 1974) was an American country music singer and actor. He was the patriarch of the Ritter acting family (son John Ritter, grandsons Jason Ritter and Tyler Ritter). He is a member of the Country Music Hall of Fame.

== Early life ==
Woodward Maurice Ritter was born on January 12, 1905, in Murvaul, Texas, to Martha Elizabeth (née Matthews) and James Everett Ritter. He grew up on his family's farm in Panola County, Texas, and attended grade school in Carthage, Texas. He attended South Park High School in Beaumont, Texas. After graduating with honors, he entered the University of Texas at Austin in 1922 to study pre-law and major in government, political science, and economics. After traveling to Chicago with a musical troupe, he entered Northwestern Law School.

== Career ==
=== Radio and Broadway ===
An early pioneer of country music, Ritter soon became interested in show business. In 1928, he sang on KPRC in Houston, Texas, a 30-minute program of mostly cowboy songs. That same year, he moved to New York City and landed a job in the men's chorus of the Broadway show The New Moon (1928). He appeared as cowboy Cord Elam in the Broadway production Green Grow the Lilacs (1931), the basis for the musical Oklahoma! He also played the part of Sagebrush Charlie in The Round Up (1932) and Mother Lode (1934).

In 1932, he starred in New York City's first broadcast Western, The Lone Star Rangers on WOR, where he sang and told tales of the Old West. Ritter wrote and starred in Cowboy Tom's Roundup on WINS in 1933, a daily children's cowboy program aired over two other East Coast stations for three years. He also performed on the radio show WHN Barndance and sang on NBC Radio shows; and appeared in several radio dramas, including CBS's Bobby Benson's Adventures.

=== Movies ===
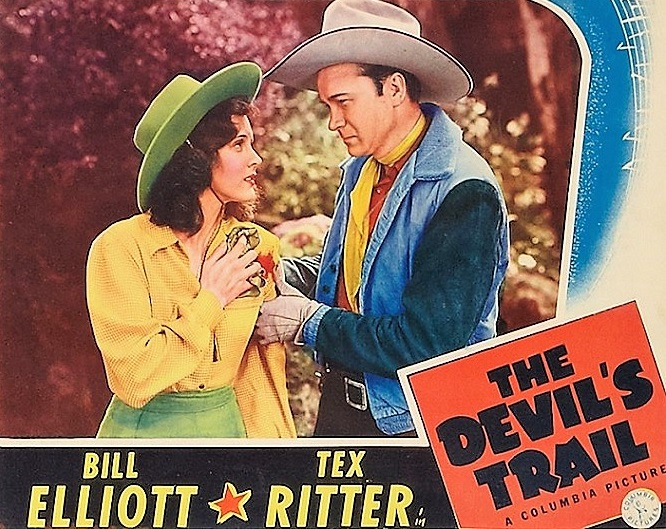
Lobby card for The Devil's Trail (1942)

In 1936, Ritter moved to Los Angeles. His motion picture debut was in Song of the Gringo (1936) for Grand National Pictures. He went on to appear in 70 movies as an actor, and 76 on movie soundtracks. He attracted special attention in 1952 for his rendition of "The Ballad of High Noon" over the opening credits of the celebrated film High Noon, and later sang it at that year's Academy Awards ceremony, where it won Best Original Song.

=== Recording ===
Ritter's recording career was his most successful period. He was the first artist signed with the newly formed Capitol Records in 1942.

In 1944, he scored a hit with "I'm Wastin' My Tears on You", which hit number one on the country chart and number 11 on the pop chart. An article in the trade publication Billboard noted 14 years later that with that song, he "reached the style of rhythmic tune that would assure his musical stature".

In 1952 Ritter recorded "The Ballad of High Noon" for the film High Noon. He performed the track at the first televised Academy Awards ceremony in 1953, and it received an Oscar for Best Song that year.

=== Television ===
When television began to compete with movies for American audiences, Ritter began to make appearances on the new medium following 71 straight movie appearances. In 1953, he began performing on Town Hall Party on radio and television in Los Angeles. In 1957, he co-hosted Ranch Party, a syndicated version of the show. He made his national TV debut in 1955 on ABC-TV's Ozark Jubilee and was one of five rotating hosts for its 1961 NBC-TV spin-off, Five Star Jubilee.

=== Later work ===
Ritter became one of the founding members of the Country Music Association in Nashville, Tennessee, and spearheaded the effort to build the Country Music Hall of Fame and Museum into which he was inducted in 1964.

He moved to Nashville in 1965 and began working for radio station WSM and the Grand Ole Opry, earning a lifetime membership in the latter in 1970.

Ritter provided the voice of Big Al in Disney's Country Bear Jamboree, which opened in 1971 at the Magic Kingdom. Big Al sung Tex Ritter's "Blood on the Saddle", which became an iconic and beloved moment in the show. The attraction would later open in 1972 at Disneyland and in 1983 at Tokyo Disneyland. While the Disneyland and Magic Kingdom versions of the original Jamboree would close in 1985 and 2024 respectively (Disneyland's being replaced by the Vacation Jamboree which closed in 2001, and Magic Kingdom's being replaced by the Musical Jamboree which still operates today), Ritter's performance as Big Al can still be heard in Tokyo to this day.

== Senate campaign ==
In 1970, Ritter entered Tennessee's Republican primary election for United States Senate. Despite high name recognition, he lost the nomination to United States Representative Bill Brock, who then defeated the incumbent Senator Albert Gore Sr. in the general election.

== Personal life and death ==
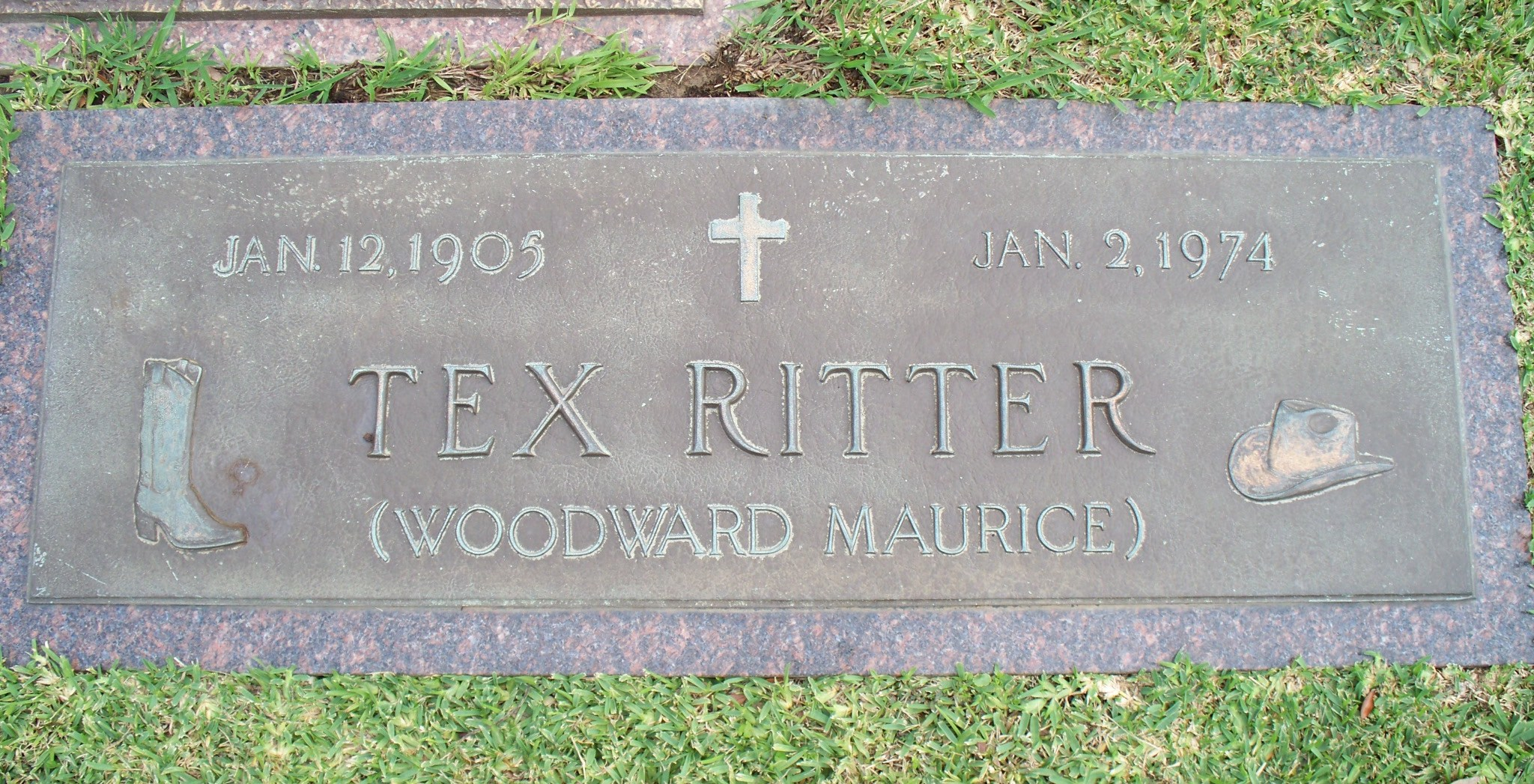
Ritter's grave marker in Port Neches in Jefferson County, Texas

Tex Ritter married movie actress Dorothy Fay on June 14, 1941. They raised their sons, Tom and John in Los Angeles, then moved to Nashville, Tennessee, in 1965, as Tex was focused on singing and recording.

He died of a heart attack in Nashville on January 2, 1974, at age 68. Because his son John died at age 54 of an aortic dissection, which is known to be hereditary, the family now believes that Tex died of an aortic dissection.

== Legacy ==
For his contribution to the recording industry, Ritter has a star on the Hollywood Walk of Fame at 6631 Hollywood Boulevard. In 1980, he was inducted into the Western Performers Hall of Fame at the National Cowboy & Western Heritage Museum in Oklahoma City, Oklahoma. He was a member of the charter group of inductees into the Texas Country Music Hall of Fame in Carthage, in 1998.

In 1986, Ritter was honored posthumously with a Golden Boot Award for his work in Western films.

Ritter can still be heard as the voice of Big Al, an audio-animatronic bear, at Disney theme park attraction Country Bear Jamboree at Tokyo Disneyland in Urayasu, Chiba, Japan; and formerly at the Magic Kingdom at Walt Disney World and Disneyland in Anaheim, California.

== Selected filmography ==
- Song of the Gringo (1936) – Tex
- Headin' for the Rio Grande (1936) – Tex Saunders
- Arizona Days (1937) – Tex Malinson
- Trouble in Texas (1937) – Tex Masters
- Hittin' the Trail (1937) – Tex Randall
- Sing, Cowboy, Sing (1937) – Tex Archer
- Riders of the Rockies (1937) – Tex Rand
- The Mystery of the Hooded Horsemen (1937) – Tex Martin
- Tex Rides with the Boy Scouts (1937) – Tex Collins
- Frontier Town (1938) – Tex Lansing, alias Tex Rawlins
- Rollin' Plains (1938) – Tex Lawrence
- The Utah Trail (1938) – Tex Stewart, posing as the Pecos Kid
- Starlight Over Texas (1938) – Tex Newman
- Where the Buffalo Roam (1938) – Tex Houston
- Song of the Buckaroo (1938) – Texas Dan
- Sundown on the Prairie (1939) – Tex
- Rollin' Westward (1939) – Tex
- Man from Texas (1939) – Tex Allen
- Down the Wyoming Trail (1939) – Tex Yancey
- Riders of the Frontier (1939) – Tex Lowery
- Westbound Stage (1939) – Tex Wallace
- Rhythm of the Rio Grande (1940) – Tex Regan
- Pals of the Silver Sage (1940) – Tex Wright
- The Cowboy from Sundown (1940) – Sheriff Tex Rockett
- The Golden Trail (1940) – Tex Roberts
- Rainbow Over the Range (1940) – Tex Reed
- Roll Wagons Roll (1940) – Tex Masters
- Arizona Frontier (1940) – Tex
- Take Me Back to Oklahoma (1940) – Tex Lawton
- Rolling Home to Texas (1940) – Tex Reed
- Ridin' the Cherokee Trail (1941) – Ranger Lt. Tex Ritter
- The Pioneers (1941) – Tex
- King of Dodge City (1941) – Tex Rawlings
- Roaring Frontiers (1941) – Tex Martin (listed as Tex Rawlings)
- The Lone Star Vigilantes (1942) – Tex Martin
- Bullets for Bandits (1942) – Sheriff Tex Martin
- North of the Rockies (1942) – Tex Martin
- The Devil's Trail (1942) – Marshal Tex Martin
- Prairie Gunsmoke (1942) – Tex Terrell
- Vengeance of the West (1942) – California Ranger Captain Tex Lake
- Deep in the Heart of Texas (1942) – Brent Gordon
- Little Joe, the Wrangler (1942) – Sheriff Bob Brewster
- The Old Chisholm Trail (1942) – Montana Smith
- Tenting Tonight on the Old Camp Ground (1943) – Bob Courtney
- Cheyenne Roundup (1943) – Steve Rawlins
- Raiders of San Joaquin (1943) – Gil Blake
- The Lone Star Trail (1943) – Fargo Steele
- Frontier Badmen (1943) – Jerry Kimball (cattle buyer)
- Arizona Trail (1943) – Johnnie Trent
- Marshal of Gunsmoke (1944) – Marshal Ward Bailey
- Cowboy Canteen (1944) – Tex Coulter
- Oklahoma Raiders (1944) – Steve Nolan
- Gangsters of the Frontier (1944) – Tex Haines
- Dead or Alive (1944) – Tex Haines aka Idaho Kid
- The Whispering Skull (1944) – Tex Haines
- Marked for Murder (1945) – Tex Haines
- Enemy of the Law (1945) – Tex Haines
- Three in the Saddle (1945) – Tex Haines
- Frontier Fugitives (1945) – Texas Ranger Tex Haines
- Flaming Bullets (1945) – Texas Ranger Tex Haines
- Holiday Rhythm (1950) – Tex Ritter
- Buffalo Bill in Tomahawk Territory (1952) – stock footage from "Where the Buffalo Roam" (uncredited, archive footage)
- The Marshal's Daughter (1953) – Background Singer (singing voice)
- Wichita (1955) – Singer
- Apache Ambush (1955) – Traeger
- The First Bad Man (1955) – Narrator
- Down Liberty Road (1956) – George
- Trooper Hook (1957) – Title Song Singer (voice)
- Ranch Party (1958, TV Series – regular)
- Tom and Jerry (1965, TV Series) – alternate host
- Nashville Rebel (1966) – Himself
- The Girl from Tobacco Row (1966) – Preacher Bolton
- What Am I Bid? (1967) – Tex Ritter
- The Marshal of Windy Hollow (1972) – Windy Hollow mayor
- Sing a Country Song (1973) – Ryan (final film role)

== Discography ==
=== Albums ===
Year	Album	US Country	Label
1948	"Children's Songs and Stories" (4 p's 78's in a cover with pictures)		Capitol
1954	Cowboy Favorites (4 p's 78's in a cover with pictures)		Capitol
1958	Songs from the Western Screen		Capitol
1958	Psalms		Capitol
1960	Blood on the Saddle		Capitol
1961	Lincoln Hymns		Capitol
1961	Hillbilly Heaven		Capitol
1962	Stan Kenton! Tex Ritter!		Capitol
1963	Border Affair		Capitol
1965	Friendly Voice		Capitol
1966	The Best of Tex Ritter	38	Capitol
1967	Sweet Land of Liberty	43	Capitol
1967	Just Beyond the Moon	18	Capitol
1968	Bump Tiddil Dee Bum Bum!	38	Capitol
1968	Tennessee Blues (Label: Hilltop Records)		Capitol
1968	Wild West		Capitol
1969	Chuck Wagon Days		Capitol
1970	Green Green Valley		Capitol
1972	Super Country Legendary		Capitol
1973	An American Legend	7	Capitol
1974	Fall Away	44	Capitol
1976	Comin' After Jinny		Capitol

=== Singles ===
Year	Single	Chart Positions		Album
Year	Single	US Country	US	Album
1944	"I'm Wastin' My Tears on You"	1	11	singles only
1944	"There's a New Moon Over My Shoulder"	2	21	singles only
1945	"Jealous Heart"	2		singles only
1945	"You Two-Timed Me One Time Too Often"	1		singles only
1946	"You Will Have To Pay"	1		singles only
1946	"Christmas Carols by the Old Corral"	2		singles only
1946	"Long Time Gone"	5		singles only
1946	"When You Leave, Don't Slam the Door"	3		singles only
1946	"Have I Told You Lately that I Love You?"	3		singles only
1948	"Rye Whiskey"	9		singles only
1948	"The Deck of Cards"	10		singles only
1948	"Pecos Bill" (w/ Andy Parker & The Plainsmen)	15		singles only
1948	"Rock and Rye"	5		singles only
1950	"Daddy's Last Letter"	6		singles only
1952	"High Noon (Do Not Forsake Me)"		12	singles only
1956	"The Wayward Wind"		28	singles only
1961	"I Dreamed of a Hill-Billy Heaven"	5	20	Hillbilly Heaven
1966	"The Men in My Little Girl's Life"	50		Just Beyond the Moon
1967	"Just Beyond the Moon"	13		Just Beyond the Moon
1967	"A Working Man's Prayer"	59		single only
1968	"Texas"	69		Wild West
1969	"A Funny Thing Happened (On the Way to Miami)"	53		singles only
1969	"Growin' Up"	39		singles only
1970	"Green Green Valley"	57		Green Green Valley
1971	"Fall Away"	67		Fall Away
1972	"Comin' After Jinny"	67		Comin' After Jinny
1974	"The Americans (A Canadian's Opinion)"	35	90	An American Legend
