= Edward Finney =

American film producer (1903–1983)

- Born: April 18, 1903; New York, New York, United States
- Died: January 10, 1983 (aged 79); Los Angeles, California, United States
- Occupations: Producer, director, writer, film editor
- Years active: 1936 - 1966 (film)

Edward Francis Finney (April 18, 1903 – January 10, 1983) was an American film producer and director. He is best known as the man who introduced cowboy singer Tex Ritter to the moviegoing public.

== Biography ==
Finney was educated at the City College of New York, and became an engineer at Western Electric. He entered the motion picture industry as a prop man for silent-comedy producer C.C. Burr. Finney was a born salesman and his persuasive ideas landed him a job with Metro-Goldwyn-Mayer as press sheet editor. He advanced to managerial posts in studio advertising departments, with gradually increasing responsibilities, at Pathé, United Artists, Monogram Pictures, Republic Pictures, and Grand National Pictures.

Grand National gave Finney his first chance at producing films, in 1936. He established Boots and Saddles Pictures and made a successful series of singing cowboy westerns starring his discovery Tex Ritter. When Grand National ceased operations in 1939, Finney moved his business to Monogram.

Finney became an independent producer in 1941. Occasionally Finney would be hired to make low-budget features for Producers Releasing Corporation (PRC); some of these were good enough to be distributed by the more prosperous Monogram studio. Finney co-produced Andrew L. Stone's farce comedy Hi Diddle Diddle (1943), which was released by major distributor United Artists and became a surprise hit. In 1946 Finney joined forces with California exhibitor turned producer Robert L. Lippert to form Screen Guild Productions. Finney's later films were distributed by Screen Guild and by United Artists.

Finney's wide knowledge of film properties was helpful to him as a producer. He often incorporated elaborately staged file footage from other films into his own films, making the new productions appear more costly than they actually were. This became a drawback by the 1950s, when Finney's stock shots looked noticeably older than the new footage. Finney retired from production in 1952, but in 1957 he partially financed the quickie exploitation film Gun Girls and took screen credit as producer, under the pseudonym "Edward Frank."

Edward Finney found a new outlet for his large library of old films in the 1950s: the lucrative home-movie field. He reprinted dozens of features and shorts, and offered them to collectors in the 16mm and 8mm formats.

In 1959 Edward Finney read newspaper accounts of singing star Gloria Jean now working as a hostess in a restaurant favored by movie people. Finney, a Gloria Jean fan of long standing, decided to make his own Gloria Jean movie and reactivated Boots and Saddles Pictures. He wrote, produced, and edited the new film, the lightweight comedy Laffing Time, co-starring Finney himself (as comedian "Eddie Finn") and veteran comic El Brendel. Finney later added old action footage to it and retitled it The Madcaps. This version was released to theaters in 1964. A third version, Tobo the Happy Clown (1966), added footage from antique comedies and was aimed at the kiddie-matinée market; Finney played the title role.

Tobo the Happy Clown was Edward Finney's last theatrical production. He serviced the home-movie community into the late 1970s.

== Selected filmography ==
=== As producer ===
- Song of the Gringo (1936)
- Arizona Days (1937)
- The Mystery of the Hooded Horsemen (1937)
- Tex Rides with the Boy Scouts (1937)
- Where the Buffalo Roam (1938)
- The Utah Trail (1938)
- Rollin' Plains (1938)
- Frontier Town (1938)
- Down the Wyoming Trail (1939)
- Man from Texas (1939)
- Riders of the Frontier (1939)
- Roll Wagons Roll (1940)
- The Golden Trail (1940)
- Gentleman from Dixie (1941)
- The Pioneers (1941)
- Corregidor (1943)
- Hi Diddle Diddle (1943)
- Strange Holiday (1945)
- Queen of the Amazons (1947)
- Call of the Forest (1949)
- Buffalo Bill in Tomahawk Territory (1952)
- Gun Girls (1957, credited as Edward Frank)
- Laffing Time (1959), revised as The Madcaps (1964) and again as Tobo the Happy Clown (1966)

=== As director ===
- Silver Stallion (1941)
- Riot Squad (1941)
- King of the Stallions (1942)
- Queen of the Amazons (1947)

== Bibliography ==
- MacGillivray, Scott and MacGillivray, Jan. Gloria Jean: A Little Bit of Heaven. iUniverse, 2005.
- Pitts, Michael R. Western Movies: A Guide to 5,105 Feature Films. McFarland, 2012.
