= Horace Murphy =

American actor (1880–1975)

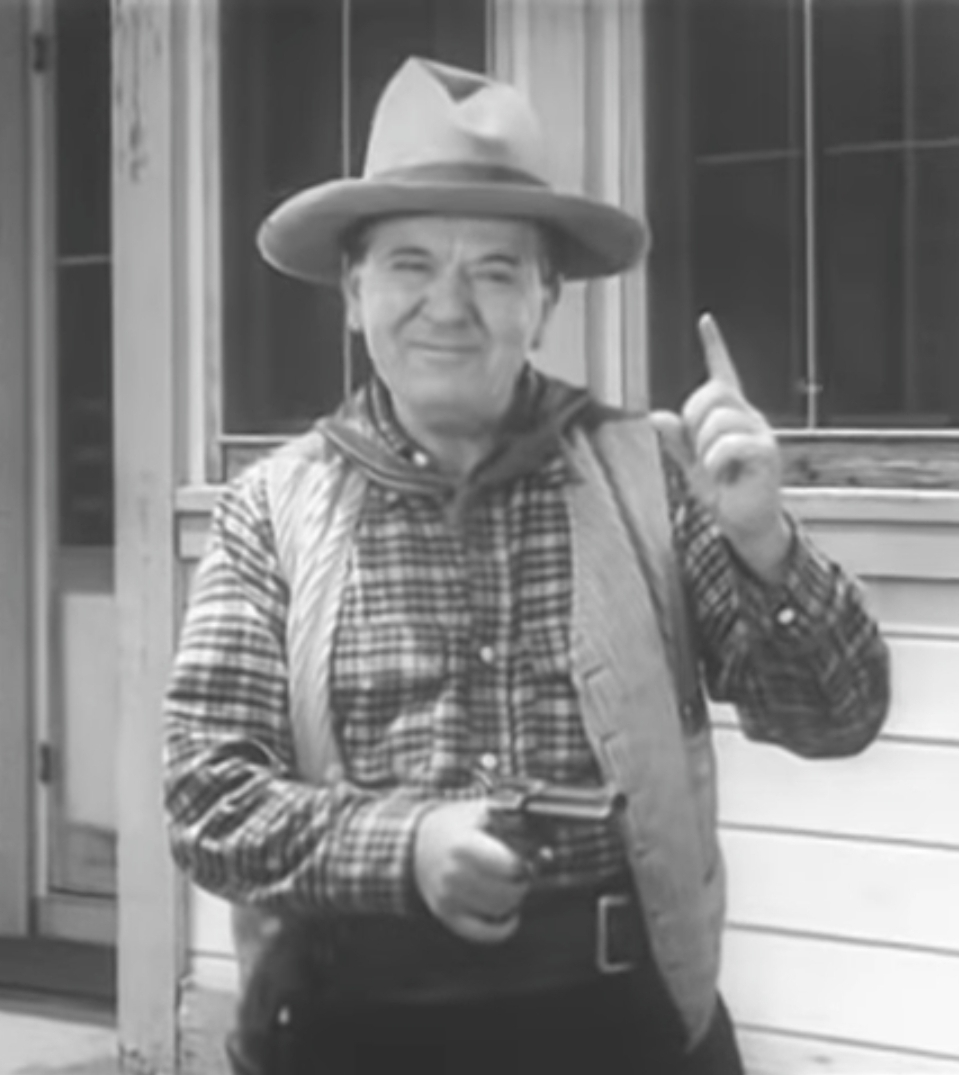
- Murphy in The Utah Trail (1938)
- Born: June 3, 1880; Osceola, Arkansas, U.S.
- Died: January 20, 1975 (aged 94); Studio City, California, U.S.
- Occupation: Actor
- Years active: 1931–1953

Horace Murphy (June 3, 1880 – January 20, 1975) was an American film actor. He appeared in more than 120 films between 1931 and 1953.

== Early years ==
Born in Osceola, Arkansas, Murphy was playing cornet by age 11, and six years later led the band for the Newton Family Wagon Show. The next spring, he became the leader of a 45-piece band for the C.W. Parker Carnival Company. After two years in that position, he left to work in Dr. Rucker's Korak Wonder Medicine Show in order to be able to act in addition to leading the band.

== Radio ==
Murphy played Will Kimble, the storekeeper, in Granby's Green Acres, a radio show which was on CBS in the summer of 1950. He also had roles in several radio westerns, including Shorty on Gene Autry's Melody Ranch, Clackity for one season of The Roy Rogers Show, and Buckskin Blodgett on Red Ryder.

== Selected filmography ==
- Timber War (1935)
- Last of the Warrens (1936)
- Everyman's Law (1936)
- Rogue of the Range (1936)
- Desert Guns (1936)
- The Crooked Trail (1936)
- Song of the Trail (1936)
- The Gun Ranger (1936)
- Gun Grit (1936)
- Ranger Courage (1936)
- The Unknown Ranger (1936)
- Anything for a Thrill (1937)
- The Frame-Up (1937)
- The Gambling Terror (1937)
- Lawless Land (1937)
- Riders of the Rockies (1937)
- Trouble in Texas (1937)
- Sing, Cowboy, Sing (1937)
- The Mystery of the Hooded Horsemen (1937)
- Come on, Cowboys (1937)
- Billy the Kid Returns (1938)
- Rollin' Plains (1938)
- Frontier Town (1938)
- The Utah Trail (1938) Ananias
- Where the Buffalo Roam (1938)
- Down the Wyoming Trail (1939)
- The Oklahoma Kid (1939) as a Bartender (uncredited)
- Boom Town (1940)
- The Range Busters (1940)
- Bad Man of Deadwood (1941)
- Arizona Bound (1941)
- The Lonesome Trail (1945)
- Song of Old Wyoming (1945)
