= The Dummy (disambiguation) =

The Dummy may refer to:

- "The Dummy", a 1962 episode of The Twilight Zone television series
- The Dummy (1917 film), an American silent drama film
- The Dummy (1929 film), an American comedy film

== See also ==
- Dummy (disambiguation)
