= Dummy =

Dummy may refer to:

== Dolls ==
- Mannequin, a model of the human body
- Dummy (ventriloquism)
- Crash test dummy

== People ==
- Dummy (nickname), several people with the nickname
- Dummy, the Witch of Sible Hedingham (c. 1788–1863), one of the last people to be accused of being a witch in England

== Arts and entertainment ==
=== Characters ===
- Dummy (Marvel Comics), from the comic book X-Men
- Dummy (DC Comics)

=== Films ===
- Dummy (1979 film), a TV movie starring LeVar Burton and Paul Sorvino
- Dummy (2002 film), a comedy/drama
- Dummy, a 2009 coming-of-age drama starring Emma Catherwood
- Dummy, a short film by Kira Muratova
- The Dummy (1917 film), an American silent drama
- The Dummy (1929 film), an American comedy

=== Music ===
- Dummy (band), a band from Los Angeles
- Dummy (album), 1994, by Portishead
- "Dummy", a song by 6ix9ine from the album Dummy Boy
- "Dummy!", a track from the soundtrack of the 2015 video game Undertale by Toby Fox
- "Dummy", a song by Portugal. The Man from the album Chris Black Changed My Life
- "Dummy", a 2023 song by Keung To

=== Television ===
- "Dummy" (Pushing Daisies episode)
- "The Dummy", an episode of The Twilight Zone
- Dummy (TV series), a 2020 web comedy

=== Other ===
- Dummy, in contract bridge, the partner of the player who wins the auction, or that player's hand

== Linguistics ==
- Dummy auxiliary, such as do in some English sentences
- Dummy pronoun, such as it in the sentence it is good to relax
- Placeholder word

== Military ==
- Dummy round, a round of ammunition that is completely inert
- Military dummy, fake military equipment used for deception

== Sport ==
- Dummy (football), an association football (soccer), rugby league and rugby union ruse
- Dummy pass, in rugby league football

== Other uses ==
- Dummy Lake (disambiguation), any of several places
- Dummy sheet, a blank sheet folded as a pre-print newspaper test
- Dummy variable, another term for bound variable in mathematics
- Dummy variable (statistics), another term for binary variable in statistics
- Pacifier, called a dummy in some countries
- Steam dummy, a steam engine made to resemble a railroad passenger coach

== See also ==
- Dum (disambiguation)
- Dumb (disambiguation)
- For Dummies, an instructional/reference book series
