= Dumbo (disambiguation) =

Dumbo is a 1941 American animated film.

Dumbo may also refer to:

- SS Dumbo, a 1,051 GRT coaster that was built in 1944
- Dumbo (2019 film), an American fantasy period adventure film directed by Tim Burton
- "Dumbo" (song), a song by American rapper and singer Travis Scott
- Dumbo rat, a type of fancy rat distinguished by its ears
- Dumbo the Flying Elephant, an aerial carousel-style ride located in Fantasyland at six Disney theme parks
- Dumbo, a design of nuclear thermal rocket by the United States
- Grimpoteuthis (also the dumbo octopus), a genus of pelagic cirrate (finned) octopods

== Military ==
- Dumbo (air-sea rescue), 1940s and 1950s United States Navy search and rescue missions
- Dumbo, a World War II oil pipeline developed under Operation Pluto
- P-3 radar (NATO reporting name: Dumbo), an early VHF radar developed and operated by the Soviet Union

== Places ==
- Dumbo Raya, a district in the city of Gorontalo, Indonesia
- Dumbo, Brooklyn, a neighborhood in New York City
- Mandume, Angola (also Dumbo), a village in Bié Province

== See also ==
- Dumb (disambiguation)
- Dumbo's Circus
- Jumbo (disambiguation)
- Operation Dumbo Drop – 1995 film produced by Walt Disney Pictures
