= Great Scott =

Exclamation of surprise or dismay

Back to the Future Day in 2015 celebrated by The White House.

"Great Scott!" is an interjection of surprise, amazement, or dismay. It is a distinctive exclamation, popular in the second half of the 19th century and the early 20th century, and now considered dated.

It originated as a minced oath, historically associated with two specific "Scotts": Scottish author Sir Walter Scott and, later, US general Winfield Scott.

The phrase is often used by Superman, and is a catchphrase of the fictional scientist Emmett "Doc" Brown from the Back to the Future franchise. The phrase was also used by Brad Majors in The Rocky Horror Picture Show

== Origins ==
It is frequently assumed that Great Scott! is a minced oath of some sort, Scott replacing God. The 2010 edition of the Oxford Dictionary of English labels the expression as "dated" and simply identifies it as an "arbitrary euphemism for 'Great God!'".

Alternatively, it has been suggested that it may be a corruption of the South German and Austrian greeting Grüß Gott, although the meaning of the two expressions is totally different.

=== Sir Walter Scott ===
An early reference to Sir Walter Scott as the "great Scott" is found in the poem "The Wars of Bathurst 1830" published in The Sydney Monitor on 27 October 1830, still during Scott's lifetime; the pertinent line reading "Unlike great Scott, who fell at Waterloo", in reference to Scott's poorly-received The Field of Waterloo.

An explicit connection of Sir Walter Scott's name with the then familiar exclamation is found in a poem published 15 August 1871, on the centenary anniversary of Scott's birth:

Whose wild free charms,
he chanted forth Great Scott!
When shall we see
thy like again? Great Scott!

Mark Twain uses the phrase in some of his writing. The main character in A Connecticut Yankee in King Arthur's Court (1889) repeatedly utters "great Scott" as an oath. The exclamation can also be seen in The Man that Corrupted Hadleyburg (1899). Twain's disdain for Scott may be evident in The Adventures of Huckleberry Finn (1884), where he names a sinking boat the Walter Scott.

=== Winfield Scott ===
John William De Forest, in Miss Ravenel's Conversion from Secession to Loyalty (1867) reports the exclamation as referring to Winfield Scott, general‑in‑chief of the U.S. Army from 1841 to 1861:

I follow General Scott. No Virginian need be ashamed to follow old Fuss and Feathers. We used to swear by him in the army. Great Scott! the fellows said.

The general, known to his troops as Old Fuss and Feathers, weighed 300 pounds (21 stone or 136 kg) in his later years and was too fat to ride a horse. A May 1861 edition of The New York Times included the sentence:

These gathering hosts of loyal freemen, under the command of the great SCOTT.

The phrase appears in a 3 May 1864 diary entry by Private Robert Knox Sneden (later published as Eye of the Storm: a Civil War Odyssey):

"Great Scott," who would have thought that this would be the destiny of the Union Volunteer in 1861–2 while marching down Broadway to the tune of "John Brown's Body".

In the July 1871 issue of The Galaxy, in the story "Overland", the expression is again used by author by J. W. DeForest:

"Great—Scott!" he gasped in his stupefaction, using the name of the then commander-in-chief for an oath, as officers sometimes did in those days.

A large basalt rock collected by astronaut David Scott on the Apollo 15 mission to the moon in 1971 is informally known as Great Scott.
