= Dummy Lake =

Dummy Lake or Lac Dummy may refer to the following Canadian lakes:

- Dummy Lake, Manitoba, now known as Wargatie Lake
- Dummy Lake (Ontario), Kenora District, Ontario
- Lac Dummy, Outaouais, Quebec

== See also ==
- Big Dummy Lake, Barron County, Wisconsin
- Little Dummy Lake, Barron County, Wisconsin
