= Seymour, Connecticut =

- Town
- Town of Seymour
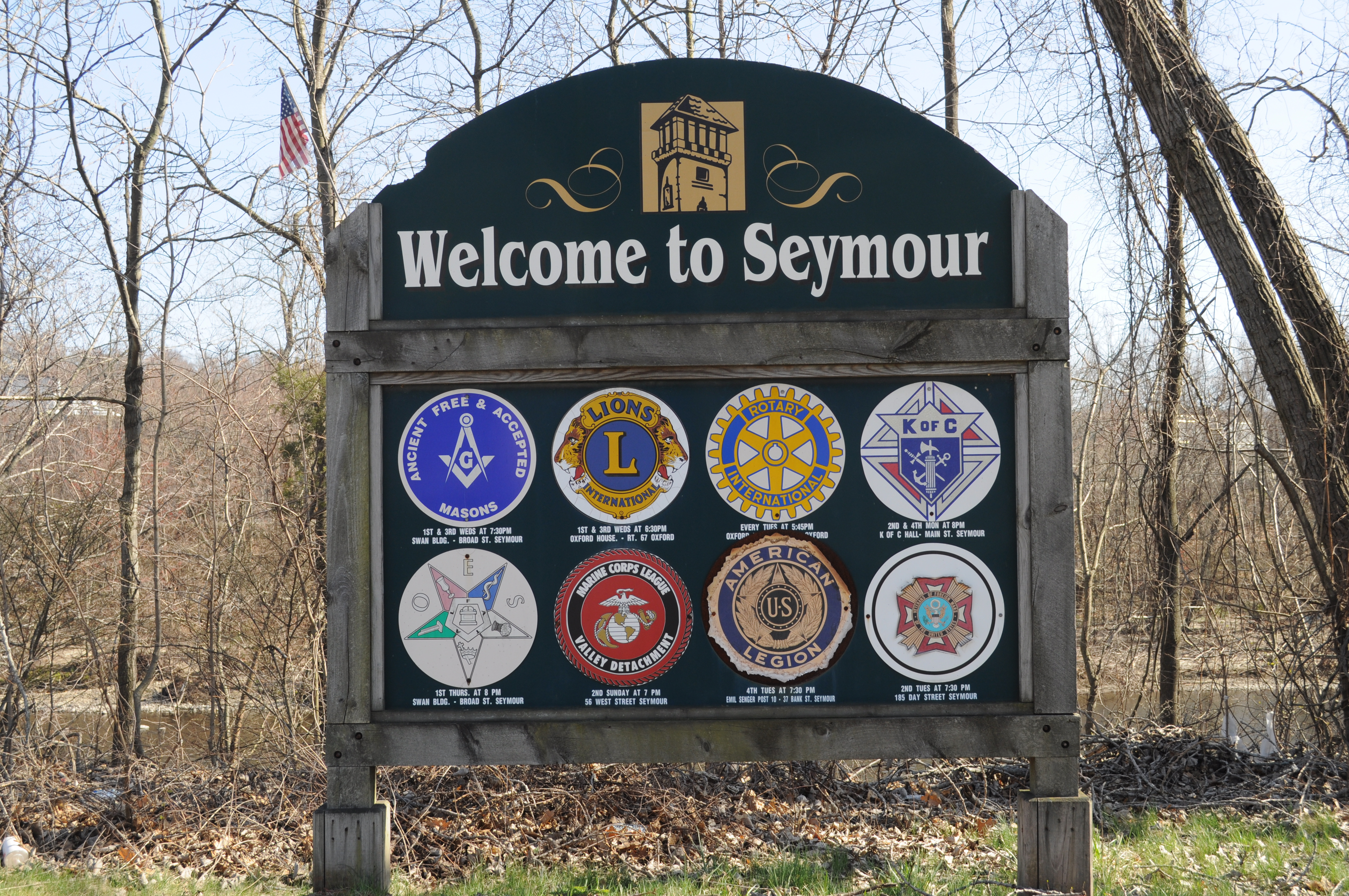
- Welcome to Seymour sign

- Seal
- Motto: "Seymour, A Nice Place to Visit....A Better Place to Live"
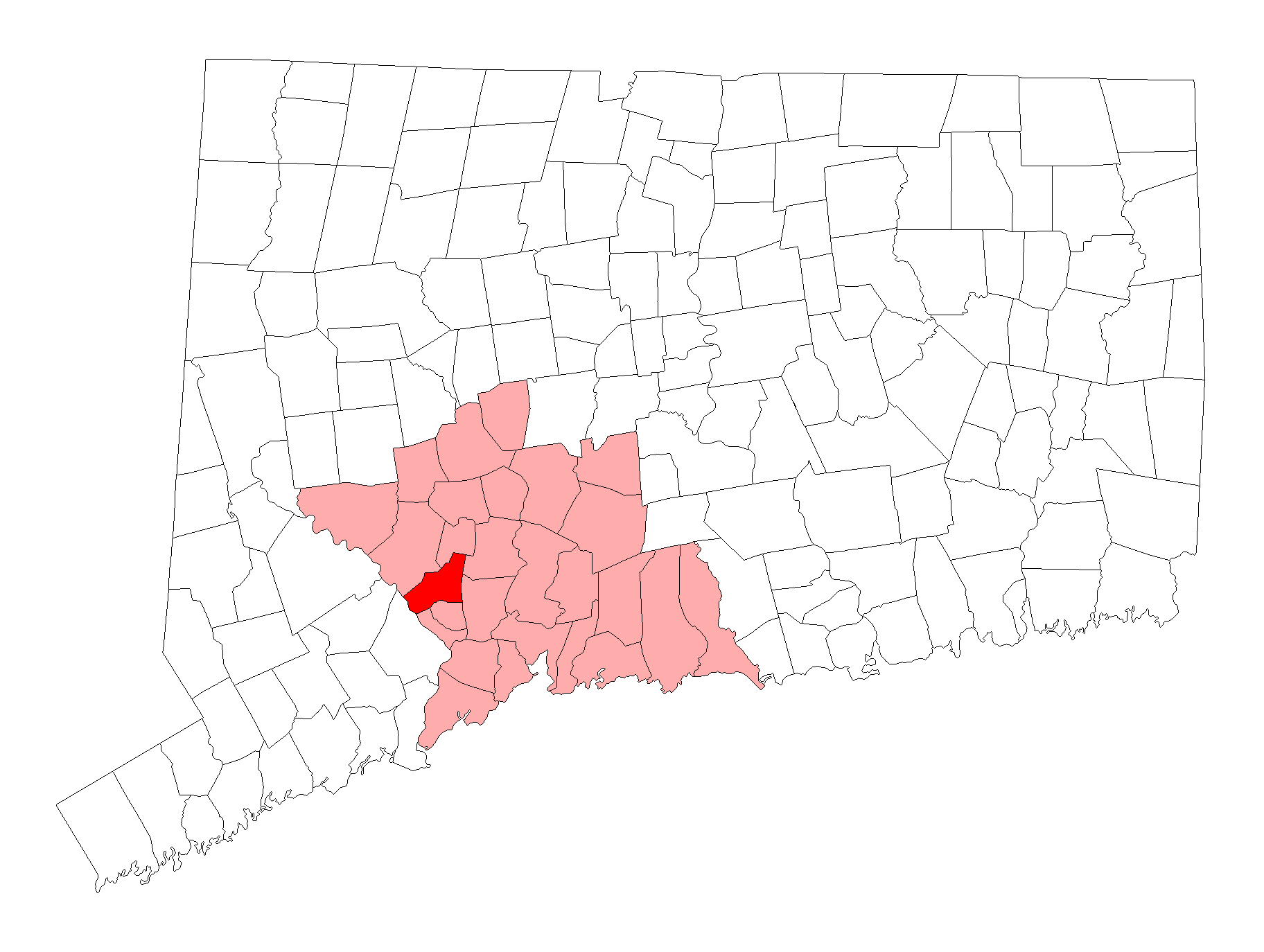
- Coordinates: 41°23′03″N 73°05′13″W
- Country: United States
- U.S. state: Connecticut
- County: New Haven
- Region: Naugatuck Valley
- Incorporated: 1850

Government
  - Type: Selectman-town meeting
  - First Selectwoman: Annmarie Drugonis (R)
  - Selectmen: Trisha Danka (R); Al Bruno (R); Robert Findley (R); Patrick Lombardi (R); Chris Bowen (D); Robert VanEgghen (D)

Area
  - Total: 15.0 sq mi (38.8 km^{2})
  - Land: 14.6 sq mi (37.7 km^{2})
  - Water: 0.39 sq mi (1.0 km^{2})
- Elevation: 387 ft (118 m)

Population (2020)
  - Total: 16,748
  - Density: 1,150/sq mi (444/km^{2})
- Time zone: UTC-5 (Eastern)
  - Summer (DST): UTC-4 (Eastern)
- ZIP code: 06483
- Area codes: 203/475
- FIPS code: 09-67610
- GNIS feature ID: 0213502
- Website: www.seymourct.org

Seymour is a town located in New Haven County, Connecticut, United States. The town is part of the Naugatuck Valley Planning Region. The population was 16,748 at the 2020 census. Seymour is bordered by the towns of Oxford and Beacon Falls to the north, Bethany and Woodbridge to the east, Ansonia and Derby to the south, and Shelton to the west.

== History ==
In the late 17th century, the site of present-day Seymour was known as Wesquantuck, a Native American settlement. Then Paugusset and Schaghticoke people created a settlement called Chusetown, named for Chief Joseph Mauwehu (Pequot), nicknamed Chuse.

The area that now encompasses the lands of the town was originally part of the town of Derby, which in turn was a part of Milford. The downtown portion of what is now Seymour was eventually called Humphreysville, named after an American Revolutionary War veteran David Humphreys, aide-de-camp to General George Washington. Humphreys had purchased a factory in what is the downtown portion of the town, which produced scythes and other tools as well as wool products from the sheep he had imported.

In 1836, Humphreysville was incorporated as a borough within the town of Derby by the General Assembly. Upon the creation of the town of Seymour in 1850, the borough government was dis-incorporated.

Seymour was incorporated as a town in May 1850, and was named for Governor Thomas H. Seymour.

== Emergency services ==
The Town of Seymour, CT has its own police department, 2 fire companies, and an ambulance association.

The Police Chief is John Bucherati. The Police Department currently operates out of its headquarters located at 11 Franklin Street. The department was previously located at 4 Wakeley Street (located behind the Citizens' Engine Co. 2 building and is now the headquarters of the Seymour Ambulance Association).

The Chief of the Fire Department is Chris Edwards who is assisted by three assistant chiefs. The department consists of two fire companies each led by one captain and two lieutenants. The Fire Marshal's is located at the Community Center and is staffed by three full-time employees, The Fire Marshal, Deputy Fire Marshal, Fire Inspector as well as volunteer fire inspectors and a part-time Administrative Assistant.

The Citizens' Engine Company No. #2 is located on DeForest Street with its primary response area being the downtown and east side of the town. Citizens' Engine was organized in August 1884 when the town purchased a Button steam powered fire engine. The original fire company, which was organized in 1882, was later disbanded and the present fire company was organized and named in honor of the town's citizens (the company adopted the number 2 since it was the second fire company to exist in town). The current firehouse was erected in the 1880s and a few years later the hose / bell tower was struck by lightning, which severely damaged it; the tower was then dismantled and rebuilt. The current apparatus bay addition was erected in 1976. The Citizens' operate two engines, a heavy rescue, a tower-ladder and a utility truck.

The Great Hill Hose Company was organized in 1947 to help improve fire protection to Seymour's rapidly growing Great Hill and Housatonic River area. Since the Citizens' Engine Company was located "downtown" it took quite some time for the firefighters and apparatus to reach the west side area. The company was first located on Great Hill Road near the old Grange building. Since the Great Hill area did not have the luxury of fire hydrants, the company utilized ponds and also tanker trucks that carried water. Since the 1950s the Great Hill area continued to grow with new homes and the present high school and middle school buildings. The Great Hill Hose Company operates two fire engines, a water tanker truck, a heavy rescue truck, a rescue boat and two utility vehicles.

Seymour Ambulance Association was organized in 1969 and incorporated as a non-profit entity in 1972. The command structure consists of one chief, one deputy chief, one assistant chief, one captain, one training coordinator, and two lieutenants. The current Chief is Bryan Ryan. The S.A.A. originally operated its ambulances from various locations and was quartered in the Citizens' firehouse using the easternmost portion of the building for several years. The organization is currently quartered at 4 Wakeley Street, the building formerly housing the Seymour Police Department.

== Geography ==
According to the United States Census Bureau, the town has a total area of 15.0 square miles (39 km^{2}), of which 14.6 square miles (38 km^{2}) is land and 0.4 square miles (1.0 km^{2}), or 2.67%, is water.

Named localities within Seymour include Bungay, Cedar Ridge District, Clifton, Garden City, Great Hill, Promise Land, Skokorat, Squantuck, and Amity.

== Demographics ==
Historical population
Census	Pop.	Note	%±
1850	1,677		—
1860	1,749		4.3%
1870	2,122		21.3%
1880	2,318		9.2%
1890	3,300		42.4%
1900	3,541		7.3%
1910	4,786		35.2%
1920	6,781		41.7%
1930	6,890		1.6%
1940	6,754		−2.0%
1950	7,832		16.0%
1960	10,100		29.0%
1970	12,776		26.5%
1980	13,434		5.2%
1990	14,288		6.4%
2000	15,454		8.2%
2010	16,540		7.0%
2020	16,748		1.3%
U.S. Decennial Census

As of the census of 2010, there were 16,540 people, 6,654 households, and 4,453 families residing in the town. The population density was 1,060.6 inhabitants per square mile (409.5/km^{2}). There were 6,356 housing units at an average density of 436.2 per square mile (168.4/km^{2}). The racial makeup of the town was 94.75% White, 1.35% African American, 0.21% Native American, 1.77% Asian, 0.02% Pacific Islander, 1.04% from other races, and 0.87% from two or more races. Hispanic or Latino of any race were 3.04% of the population.

There were 6,155 households, out of which 31.8% had children under the age of 18 living with them, 55.5% were married couples living together, 9.5% had a female householder with no husband present, and 31.6% were non-families. 26.8% of all households were made up of individuals, and 10.8% had someone living alone who was 65 years of age or older. The average household size was 2.49 and the average family size was 3.05.

In the town, the population was spread out, with 23.9% under the age of 18, 6.3% from 18 to 24, 32.6% from 25 to 44, 22.9% from 45 to 64, and 14.4% who were 65 years of age or older. The median age was 38 years. For every 100 females, there were 94.3 males. For every 100 females age 18 and over, there were 92.0 males.

The median income for a household in the town was $52,408, and the median income for a family was $65,012. Males had a median income of $46,171 versus $32,186 for females. The per capita income for the town was $24,056. About 3.6% of families and 3.7% of the population were below the poverty line, including 4.8% of those under age 18 and 3.5% of those age 65 or over.

Voter registration and party enrollment as of October 31, 2024
Party	Active voters	Inactive voters	Total voters	Percentage
Democratic	2,558	208	2,766	22.24%
Republican	3,188	181	3,369	27.09%
Unaffiliated	5,651	511	6,162	49.54%
Minor parties	127	14	134	1.13%
Total	11,524	914	12,438	100%

== Arts and culture ==
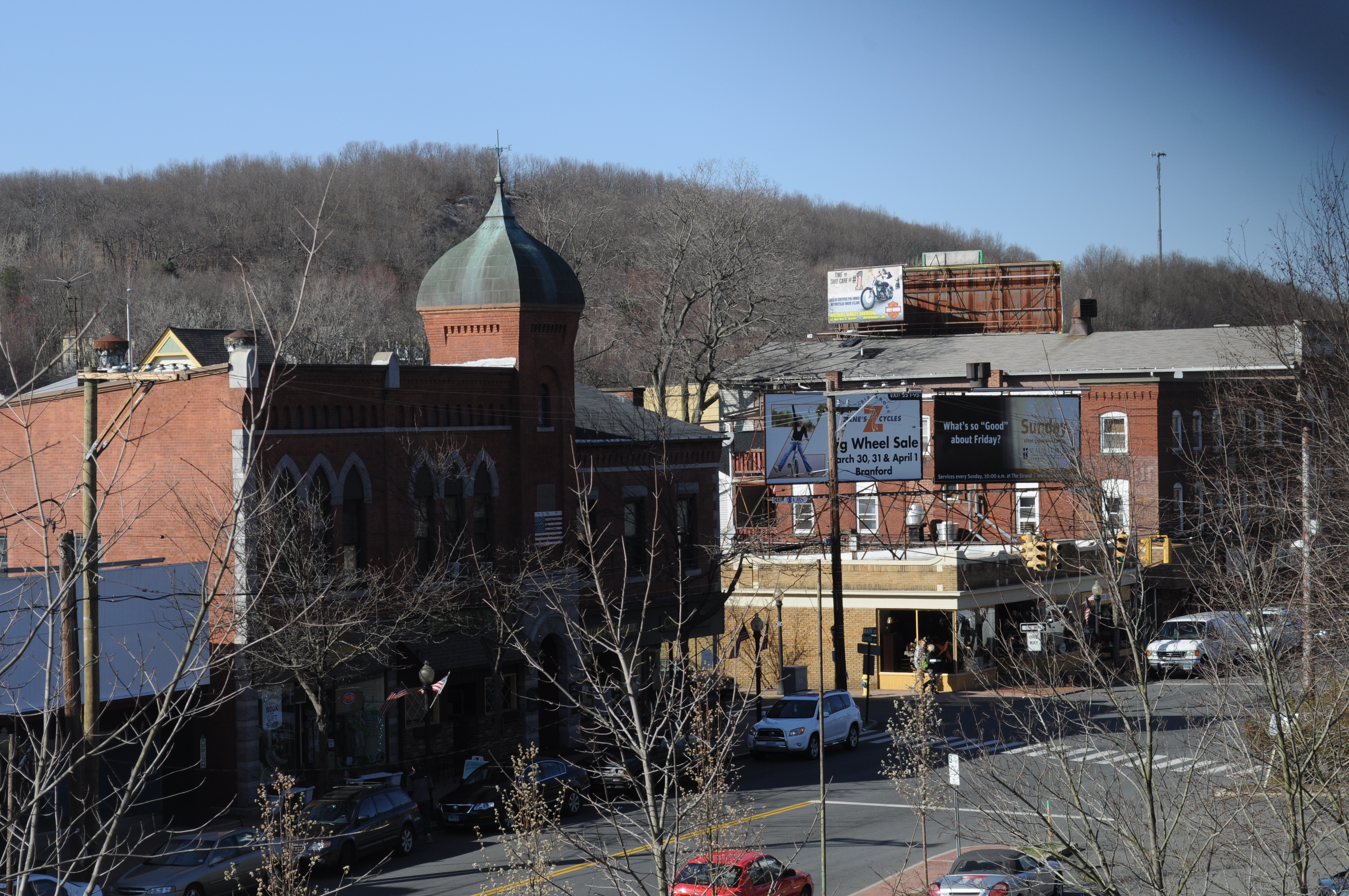
Downtown Seymour Historic District

=== Museums and other points of interest ===
- Great Hill Cemetery, founded in the 18th century.

=== On the National Register of Historic Places ===
- Downtown Seymour Historic District: Roughly bounded by the Naugatuck River, Main, Wakeley, and DeForest Streets (added September 25, 1983)
- Sanford-Humphreys House: 61–63 West Street (added June 11, 1982)
- Seymour High School and Annex: 100 Bank Street (added December 17, 1983)

== Media ==
The Valley Independent Sentinel, an online-only, non-profit news site, launched in June 2009. It covers five towns in the lower Naugatuck Valley, including Seymour.

The Valley Gazette, a weekly print and online newspaper published since 1991, covers three towns in the lower Naugatuck Valley, including Seymour.

== Education ==
There are four public schools in Seymour, Connecticut. They are Seymour High School (9–12), Seymour Middle School (6–8), Chatfield-LoPresti School (Pre-K–5), and Bungay School (K–5). Chatfield School and LoPresti School used to be separate, until they united into one school on the grounds of the former Paul E. Chatfield School. The school opened as one on the first day of school on September 5, 2012. The official dedication occurred on Sunday, October 14, 2012.

== Seymour Pink ==
Seymour Pink is a non-profit organization in Seymour. It is an organization that helps fight against breast cancer. It donates to local hospitals such as Yale's Smilow Cancer Institute and Hewitt's Breast Cancer center at Griffin Hospital. One day in the month of October is "Seymour Pink Day" where the whole town unites and wears pink in hopes of raising money. Seymour High School's sports teams also participate in the fight against breast cancer. In June 2017, the organization worked with the town's First Selectman Kurt Miller and the town's garbage and recycling company, Winter Bros., to create bright pink recycling bins. Residents could buy a pink bin to use instead of the traditional blue recycling bins and proceeds were donated to Seymour Pink.

As of 2017, the organization has raised over $1 million. The funds are used to assist those who are having trouble meeting financial commitments while undergoing treatment for breast cancer.

== Infrastructure ==
=== Transportation ===
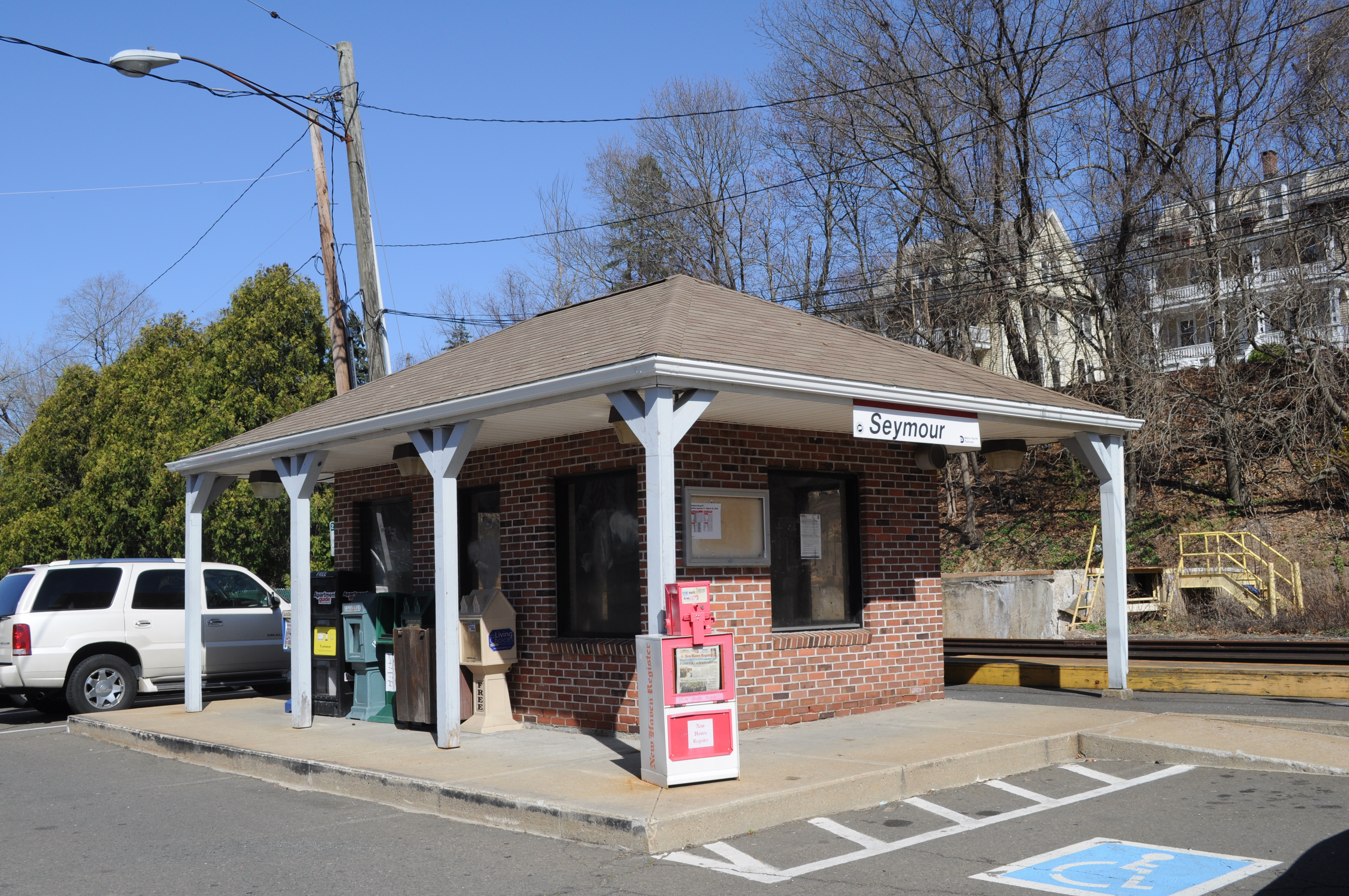
Seymour train station, 2012

The Seymour train station provides commuter rail service to Bridgeport, Stamford, and Grand Central Terminal in New York City via the Waterbury Branch on the Metro-North Railroad's New Haven Line. Seymour lies along Route 8. Connecticut Transit New Haven Division provides bus service to Seymour on its F West Chapel Street route.

== Notable people ==
- Nick Anglace (born 2002), NASCAR Driver
- John D'Agostino (born 1982), professional poker player
- Harriet Ford (1863 or 1868–1949), actress, playwright
- John William De Forest (1826–1906), a soldier and writer best known for his Civil War novel Miss Ravenel's Conversion from Secession to Loyalty
- Carlos French (1835–1903), congressman from Connecticut
- Themis Klarides (born 1965), former Connecticut House Minority Leader, Republican Candidate for the 2022 Connecticut senate election
- Robert Tuttle Morris (1857–1945), surgeon and author
- Alyssa Naeher (born 1988), soccer player

== Pictures ==
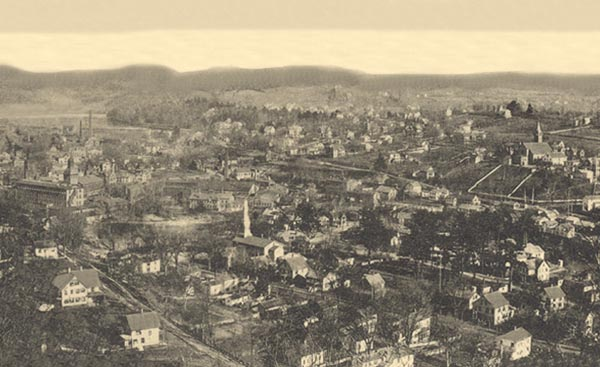
"Panorama From Castle Rock" of Seymour, from a 1905 postcard

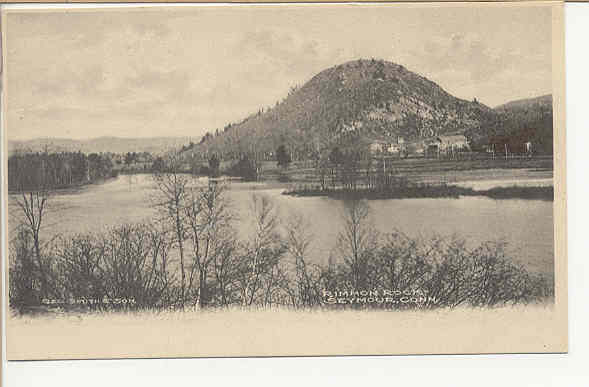
Rimmon Rock, c. 1915

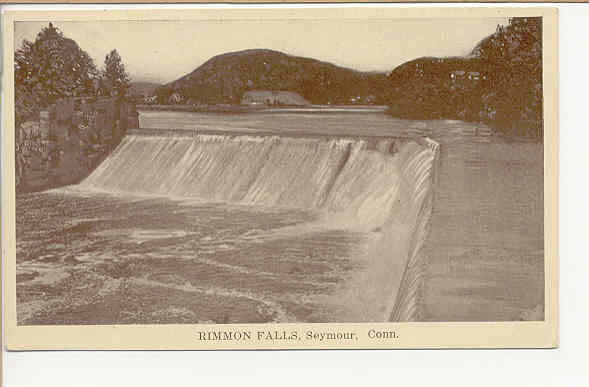
Rimmon Falls, c. 1917

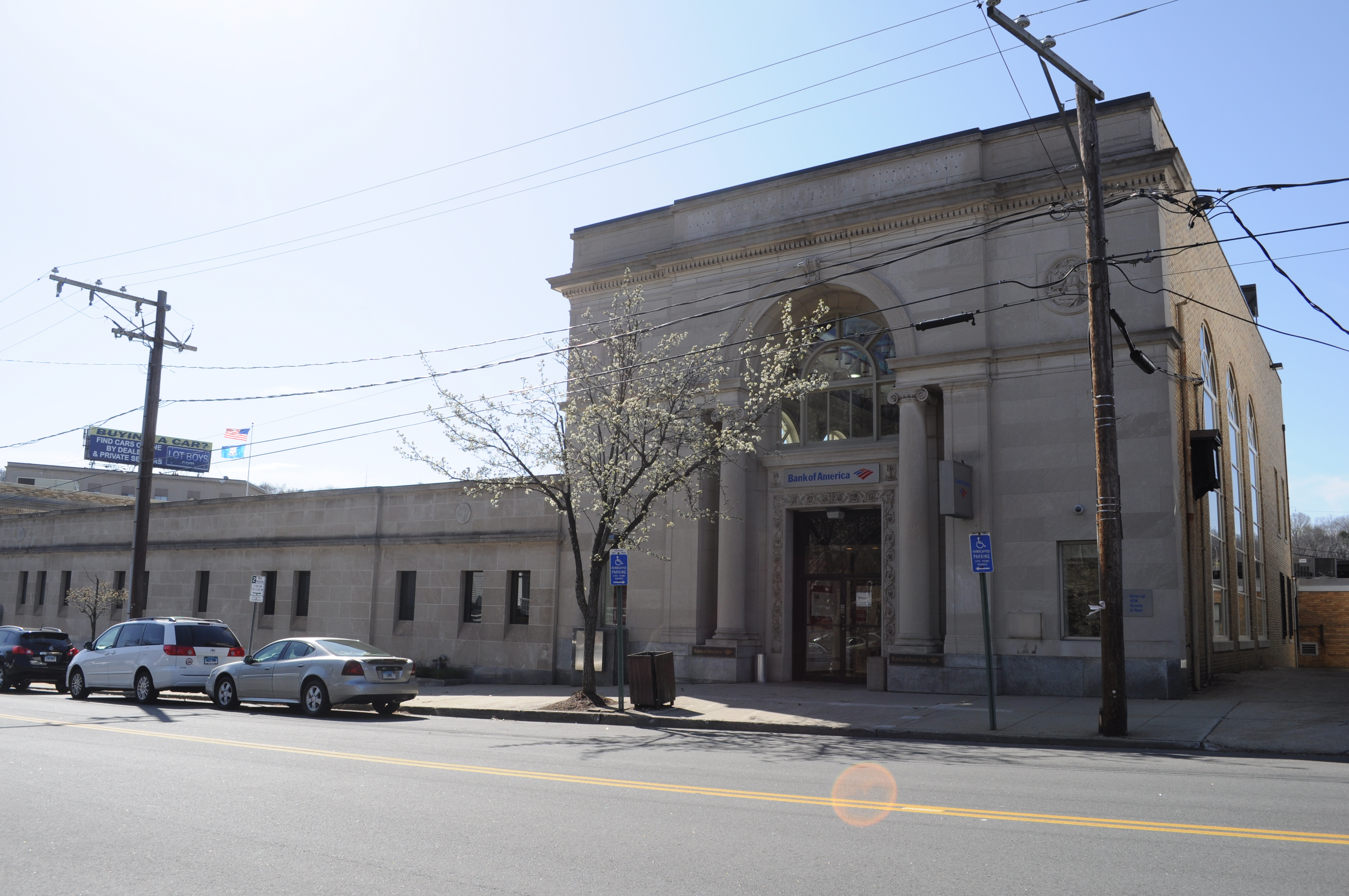
The former Seymour Trust Co., now being renovated to feature office and retail space and will initially house the nonprofit Project Purple, KirklandSEARCH and CTL.

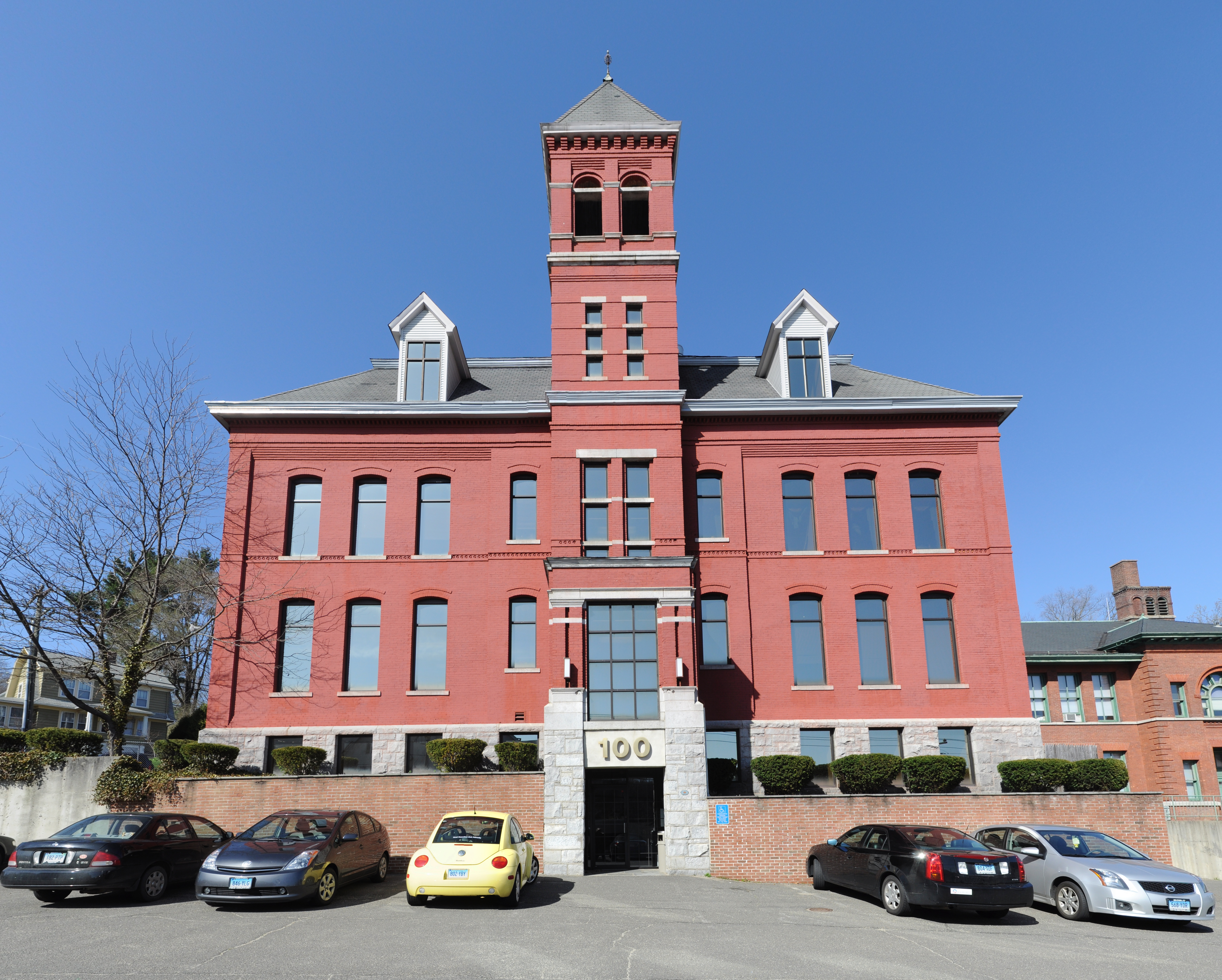
The old Seymour High School, on the National Register of Historic Places

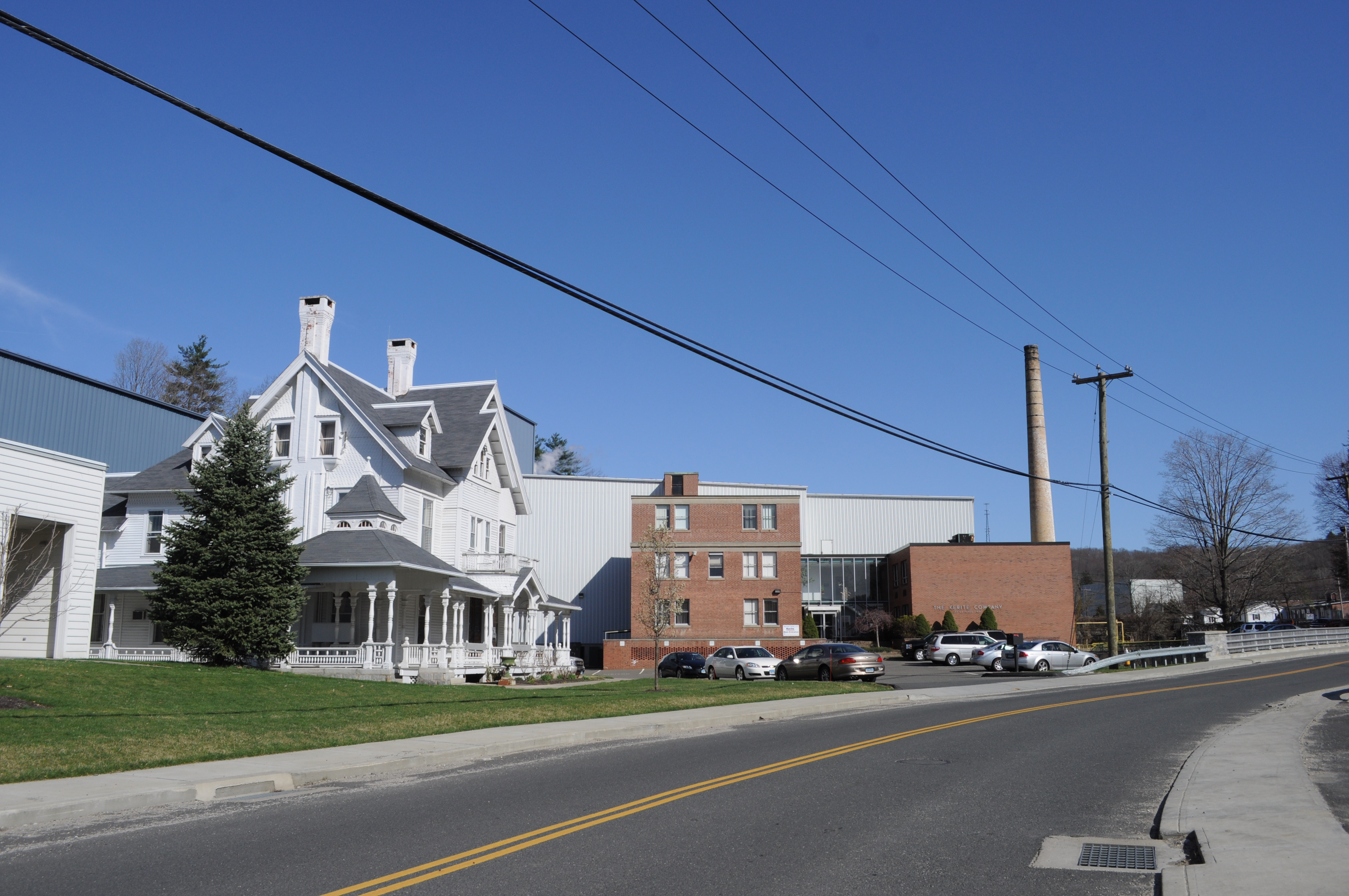
Facilities of the Kerite Company, cable manufacturer

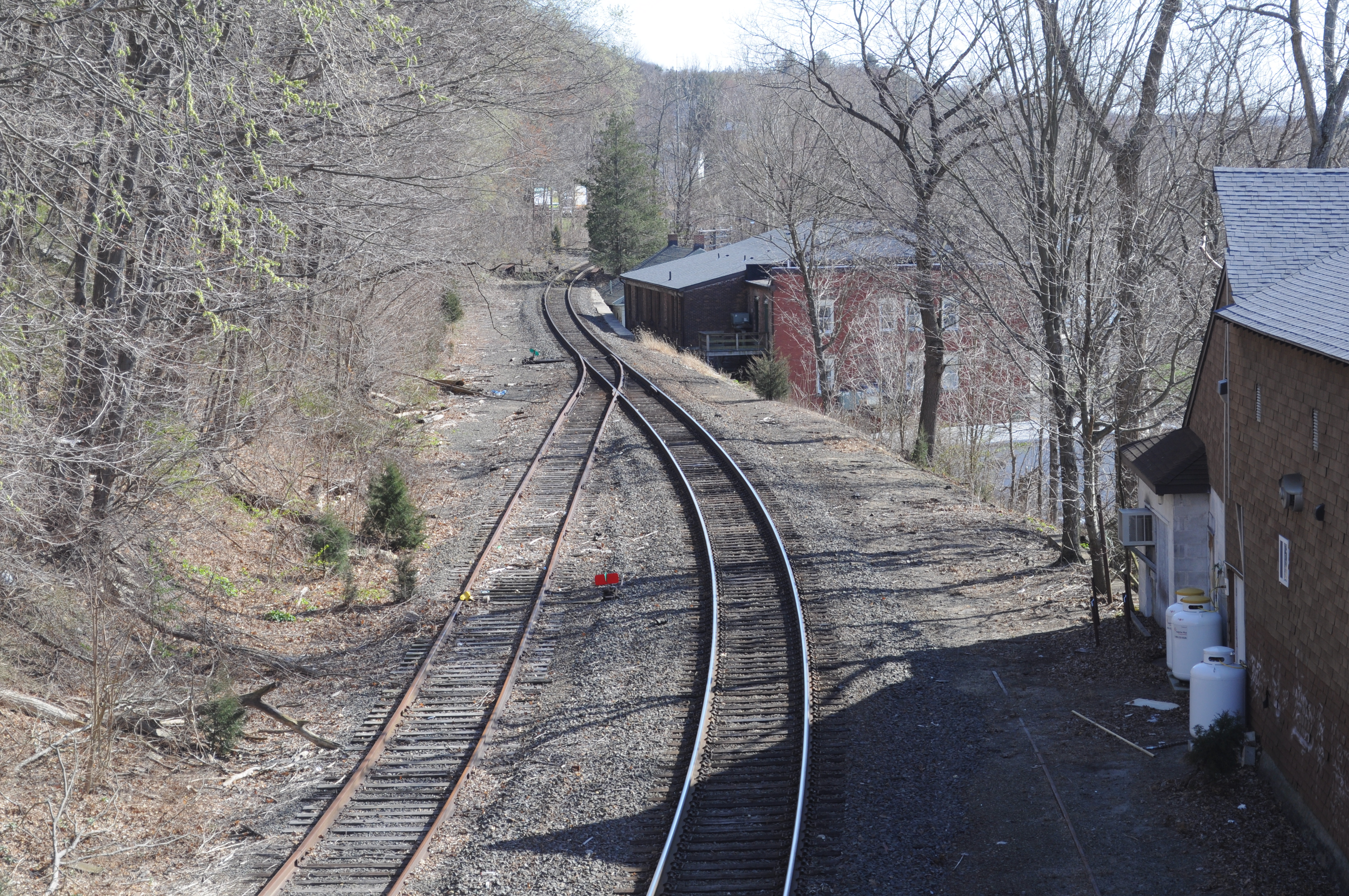
Seymour, CT – looking south from Kisson's Crossing
