= Nick Anglace =

- Born: March 29, 2002 (age 24); Seymour, Connecticut
- Height: 6'1
- Weight: 175

NASCAR FedEx Freight Truck Series career
- Truck no., team: No. TBA (Mike Harmon Racing)
- Statistics up to date as of March 19, 2026.

Nick Anglace (born March 29, 2002) is an American professional stock car racing driver. He competes part-time in the NASCAR Craftsman Truck Series, driving for Mike Harmon Racing.

== Racing career ==
=== Asphalt career ===
Nick started racing Asphalt Modified cars in 2018 at the New London Waterford Speedbowl, finishing 4th in the SK Light points standings. He transitioned to Stafford Speedway in 2019 and 2020 on a part time basis eventually picking up his first win on May 21, 2021 followed by his second on July 30, 2021. In 2025, Nick announced that UConn would be sponsoring his race team for the coming year, an announcement that received positive and negative feedback due to his "Bad Boy" image. Nick and the UConn team would end up winning three races in the SK Light series in 2025 finishing 5th in the points standings, while winning over the fans and changing his public perception. For 2026 UConn returned to Nick Anglace Racing with Kyle Muncy, Director of Brand Partnerships for UConn stating "From our perspective, it was everything that we could have hoped for..." "I think I even said to him jokingly at the beginning: ‘We’re willing to do this, we’ll see how it goes, optimistic that it will go well and when it goes really really well just don’t forget us when you’re famous.’ I think from our perspective we couldn’t be happier with sort of the direction it’s trending." Nick and UConn announced an internship program where students at UConn would be able to work directly with the race team in all aspects ranging from students that wanted to be hands on or behind the scenes working on business or graphic design, a program that is rare and a unique sponsorship activation technique. Nick's intention for 2026 is to compete for a championship at Stafford Motor Speedway while balancing the NASCAR Craftsman Truck Series for select starts. Nick and UConn would open their 2026 campaign with a 1st place finish in the season opening race on April 25, followed by a 2nd place finish the following day.

=== Craftsman Truck Series ===
On November 11, 2025, it was announced that Anglace, with the help of the UCONN, would run five races in the 2026 season for Mike Harmon Racing. The races would be ran under the Mike Harmon Racing name with Nick Anglace Racing and the UConn students working to assemble the truck in Connecticut.

== Motorsports career results ==
=== Craftsman Truck Series ===
NASCAR Craftsman Truck Series results
Year	Team	No.	Make	1	2	3	4	5	6	7	8	9	10	11	12	13	14	15	16	17	18	19	20	21	22	23	24	25	NCTC	Pts	Ref
2026	Mike Harmon Racing	TBA	TBA	DAY	ATL	STP	DAR	CAR	BRI	TEX	GLN	DOV	CLT	NSH	MCH	COR	LRP	NWS	IRP	RCH	NHA	BRI	KAN	CLT	PHO	TAL	MAR	HOM	-*	-*	
