= The Dummy (1929 film) =

1929 film

- Directed by: Robert Milton
- Screenplay by: Harriet Ford; Harvey J. O'Higgins; Herman J. Mankiewicz; Joseph L. Mankiewicz
- Produced by: Al Christie; George Christie
- Starring: Fredric March; John Cromwell; Fred Kohler; Mickey Bennett; Vondell Darr; Jack Oakie; ZaSu Pitts
- Cinematography: J. Roy Hunt
- Edited by: George Nichols Jr.
- Production company: Paramount Pictures
- Distributed by: Paramount Pictures
- Release date: March 9, 1929
- Running time: 70 minutes
- Country: United States
- Language: English

The Dummy is a 1929 American pre-Code comedy film directed by Robert Milton and written by Harriet Ford, Harvey J. O'Higgins, Herman J. Mankiewicz and Joseph L. Mankiewicz. The film stars Fredric March, John Cromwell, Fred Kohler, Mickey Bennett, Vondell Darr, Jack Oakie and ZaSu Pitts. The film was released on March 9, 1929, by Paramount Pictures.

== Cast ==
- Ruth Chatterton as Agnes Meredith
- Fredric March as Trumbull Meredith
- John Cromwell as Walter Babbing
- Fred Kohler as Joe Cooper
- Mickey Bennett as Barney Cook
- Vondell Darr as Peggy Meredith
- Jack Oakie as Dopey Hart
- ZaSu Pitts as Rose Gleason
- Richard Tucker as Blackie Baker
- Eugene Pallette as Madison

== See also ==
- List of early sound feature films (1926–1929)
