= Edwin Stanley =

American actor (1880–1944)

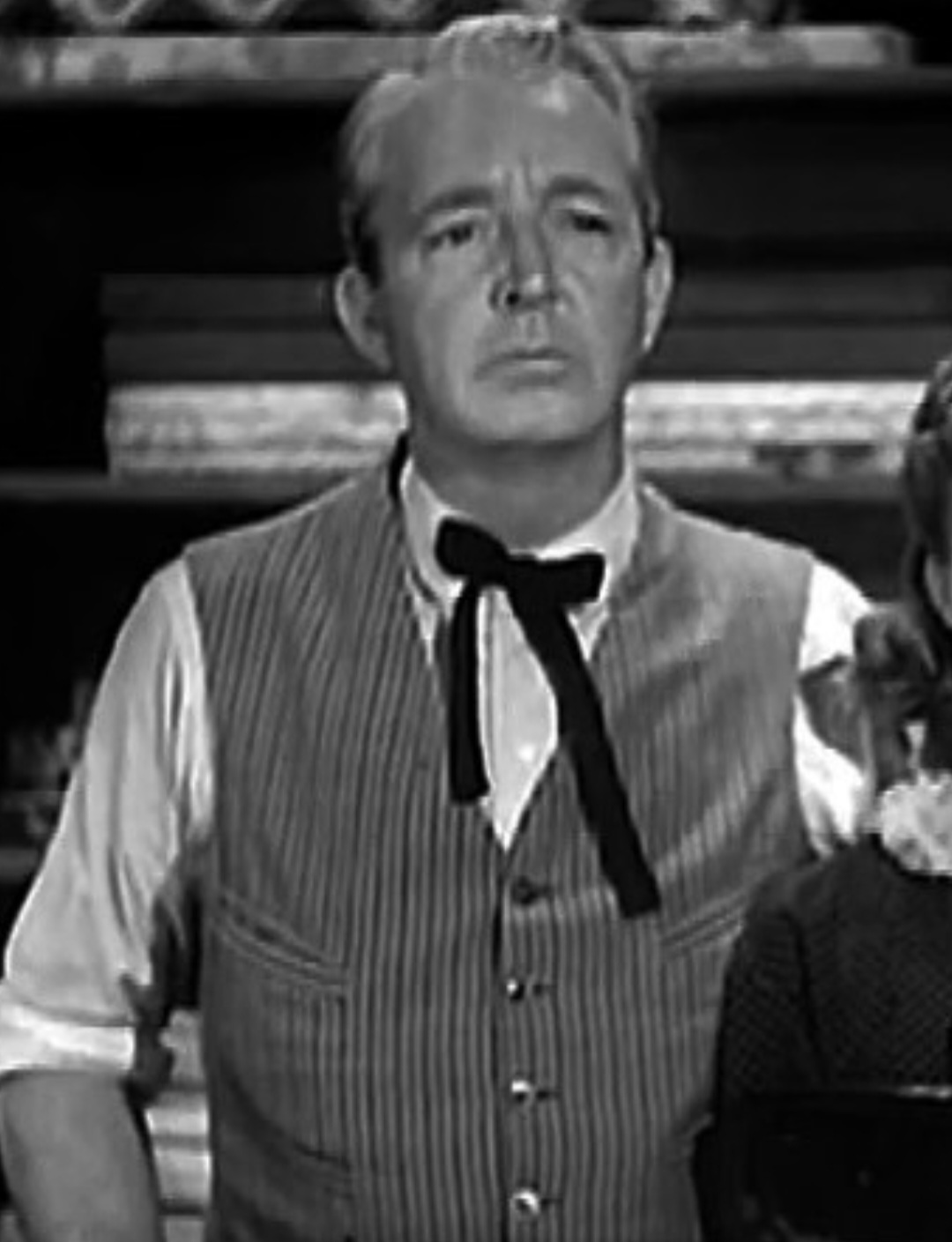
- Stanley in Billy the Kid Returns (1938)
- Born: November 22, 1880; Chicago, Illinois, U.S.
- Died: December 25, 1944 (aged 64); Hollywood, California, U.S.
- Occupation: Actor
- Years active: 1916–1946
- Spouse(s): Maude Muller (her death); Minerva Kaufman (his death)

Edwin Stanley (November 22, 1880 – December 25, 1944), was an American film actor. He appeared in more than 230 films between 1916 and 1946. He was born in Chicago, Illinois and died in Hollywood, California. On Broadway, Stanley appeared in This Man's Town (1930), The Marriage Bed (1929), and The Donovan Affair (1926). Stanley was also a playwright.

== Selected filmography ==
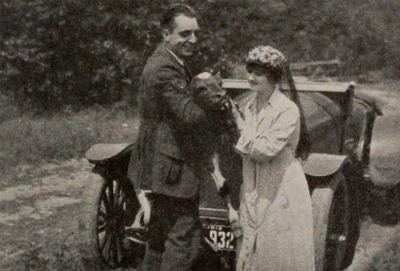
Edwin Stanley and Peggy Hyland in Marriages Are Made (1918)

- The Fear of Poverty (1916) - Alfred Griffin
- Divorce and the Daughter (1916) - Dr. John Osborne
- King Lear (1916) - Edgar
- The Dummy (1917) - Mr. Meredith
- The Law of Compensation (1917) - Raymond Wells
- Miss Deception (1917) - Tom Norton
- Just a Woman (1918) - Fred Howard
- Marriages Are Made (1918) - James Morton
- Every Mother's Son (1918) - Eldest Son
- The Love Auction (1919) - Jack Harley
- Life (1920) - Dennis O'Brien
- Scandal for Sale (1932) - Hotel Resident (uncredited)
- Amateur Daddy (1932) - 1st Fred Smith
- Virtue (1932) - District Attorney
- If I Had a Million (1932) - Mr. Galloway - Bank Manager (uncredited)
- Rockabye (1932) - Defense Attorney (uncredited)
- No Other Woman (1933) - Judge
- Lucky Devils (1933) - Mr. Spence - A Director
- Treason (1933) - District Attorney
- Murders in the Zoo (1933) - Doctor (uncredited)
- International House (1933) - Mr. Rollins - Electric Company Boss (uncredited)
- Ann Carver's Profession (1933) - Clarkson - Bill's Boss (uncredited)
- Wild Boys of the Road (1933) - Merchant (uncredited)
- My Woman (1933) - Harry Mason—Studio Manager (uncredited)
- College Coach (1933) - Regent (uncredited)
- From Headquarters (1933) - Jones - Forensic Expert (uncredited)
- Let's Fall in Love (1933) - Roland Markwell (uncredited)
- The Big Shakedown (1934) - Harris - Board Member (uncredited)
- Upper World (1934) - Joe—Fingerprint Expert (uncredited)
- Now I'll Tell (1934) - Willie Coffey (uncredited)
- The Life of Vergie Winters (1934) - Mr. Truesdale
- You Belong to Me (1934) - Major Hurley - School Commandant
- Marie Galante (1934) - Sympathetic American (uncredited)
- Jealousy (1934) - Ringside Radio Reporter (uncredited)
- A Night at the Ritz (1935) - Doctor (uncredited)
- Princess O'Hara (1935) - Prosecuting Attorney (uncredited)
- Strangers All (1935) - Policeman in Film (uncredited)
- People Will Talk (1935) - Mr. Simpson (uncredited)
- Black Sheep (1935) - Oscar's Friend (uncredited)
- Stranded (1935) - Police Surgeon (uncredited)
- The Daring Young Man (1935) - Assistant Editor (uncredited)
- One Way Ticket (1935) - Airline Official (uncredited)
- Your Uncle Dudley (1935) - Businessman (uncredited)
- Man of Iron (1935) - Doctor (uncredited)
- Two Against the World (1936) - Board Chairman (uncredited)
- Gentle Julia (1936) - Mr. Atwater (uncredited)
- The Sky Parade (1936) - Prof. Ed Manderson (uncredited)
- The Law in Her Hands (1936) - First Trial Judge (uncredited)
- Counterfeit (1936) - Mason (uncredited)
- Bullets or Ballots (1936) - Judge in Newsreel (uncredited)
- Parole! (1936) - Bank President (uncredited)
- And Sudden Death (1936) - Dr. Grayson (uncredited)
- The White Angel (1936) - Minor Role (uncredited)
- The Final Hour (1936) - District Attorney Robertson (uncredited)
- Hot Money (1936) - Joe Thomas
- Jailbreak (1936) - Judge (uncredited)
- My American Wife (1936) - Party Guest (uncredited)
- China Clipper (1936) - Airplane Designer (uncredited)
- Second Wife (1936) - 3rd Partner (uncredited)
- Trailin' West (1936) - Maj. Pinkerton
- Stage Struck (1936) - Eugene (uncredited)
- Libeled Lady (1936) - Clerk (uncredited)
- The Public Pays (1936, Short) - John Allgren, Department of Justice (uncredited)
- The Accusing Finger (1936) - Fingerprint Expert (uncredited)
- Winterset (1936) - Courtroom Witness (uncredited)
- The Mandarin Mystery (1936) - Howard Bronson
- Lady from Nowhere (1936) - Editor
- Once a Doctor (1937) - Dr. Adams
- Dick Tracy (1937, Serial) - Walter Odette
- Marked Woman (1937) - Detective Casey
- Let Them Live (1937) - Roberts (uncredited)
- Behind the Headlines (1937) - Mr. Denning (uncredited)
- Easy Living (1937) - Second Partner (uncredited)
- West Bound Limited (1937) - Judge (uncredited)
- Stella Dallas (1937) - Helen's Butler (uncredited)
- She's No Lady (1937) - Butler (uncredited)
- The Footloose Heiress (1937) - Mr. Clark (uncredited)
- The Man Who Cried Wolf (1937) - Defense Attorney (uncredited)
- The Women Men Marry (1937) - Charley (uncredited)
- Charlie Chan on Broadway (1937) - Lab Technician (uncredited)
- Love Is on the Air (1937) - Mr. Brown - KDTS Lawyer (uncredited)
- Alcatraz Island (1937) - Second Trial United States Attorney (uncredited)
- Some Blondes Are Dangerous (1937) - Reilly
- Merry-Go-Round of 1938 (1937) - Doctor (uncredited)
- Beg, Borrow or Steal (1937) - Minister (uncredited)
- Borrowing Trouble (1937) - Haynes (uncredited)
- Missing Witnesses (1937) - Grand Jury Foreman (uncredited)
- The Buccaneer (1938) - Dolly Madison's Dinner Guest (uncredited)
- International Settlement (1938) - Doctor (uncredited)
- Born to Be Wild (1938) - Randolph
- Mad About Music (1938) - Defense Attorney, Film Within a Film (uncredited)
- Love on a Budget (1938) - Committeeman Emmett (uncredited)
- Flash Gordon's Trip to Mars (1938, Serial) - Gen. Rankin [Chs. 1, 9] (uncredited)
- Mr. Moto's Gamble (1938) - Doctor (uncredited)
- Accidents Will Happen (1938) - Judge (uncredited)
- The Nurse from Brooklyn (1938) - Ballistics Expert (uncredited)
- Alexander's Ragtime Band (1938) - Critic in Army Show Audience (uncredited)
- The Fighting Devil Dogs (1938, Serial) - The Lightning (Chs. 2–12) (voice, uncredited)
- Wives Under Suspicion (1938) - Forbes - Second Judge (uncredited)
- Speed to Burn (1938) - Police Detective (uncredited)
- Always Goodbye (1938) - Decorator (uncredited)
- Racket Busters (1938) - Second Doctor - Cotwald Sanitarium (uncredited)
- Little Tough Guy (1938) - District Attorney (uncredited)
- The Missing Guest (1938) - Dr. Carroll
- You Can't Take It with You (1938) - Executive (uncredited)
- Billy the Kid Returns (1938) - Nathaniel Moore
- Too Hot to Handle (1938) - Second Advertising Man (uncredited)
- Flight to Fame (1938) - Minor Role (uncredited)
- Young Dr. Kildare (1938) - Resident Doctor (uncredited)
- The Sisters (1938) - Doctor (uncredited)
- Girls on Probation (1938) - Sutton (uncredited)
- Adventure in Sahara (1938) - Dr. Renault (uncredited)
- The Shining Hour (1938) - Minister Performing Wedding (uncredited)
- Road Demon (1938) - Doctor (uncredited)
- Comet Over Broadway (1938) - Doctor (uncredited)
- The Little Adventuress (1938) - Tom Walton (uncredited)
- Sweethearts (1938) - Man in Lobby (uncredited)
- Newsboys' Home (1938) - Bailey (uncredited)
- Kentucky (1938) - Banker (uncredited)
- The Phantom Creeps (1939, Serial) - Dr. Fred Mallory
- King of the Underworld (1939) - Dr. Jacobs
- Scouts to the Rescue (1939, Serial) - Pat Scanlon
- Tail Spin (1939) - Doctor (uncredited)
- I Was a Convict (1939) - Dr. Craile
- Mr. Moto in Danger Island (1939) - Doctor (uncredited)
- Confessions of a Nazi Spy (1939) - U.S. Official (uncredited)
- Union Pacific (1939) - Businessman at Financiers' Meeting (uncredited)
- Undercover Doctor (1939) - Leery (uncredited)
- Charlie Chan in Reno (1939) - Police Chemist (uncredited)
- Unexpected Father (1939) - Dr. Evans (uncredited)
- Mutiny on the Blackhawk (1939) - Chief of Army Intelligence (uncredited)
- When Tomorrow Comes (1939) - Man on Bus With Child (uncredited)
- Lady of the Tropics (1939) - Mr. Hype (uncredited)
- The Star Maker (1939) - Gerry Member
- Espionage Agent (1939) - Secretary of State
- Eternally Yours (1939) - Reno Lawyer Jones (uncredited)
- Sabotage (1939) - Colonel Benson- Crash Investigator (uncredited)
- 20,000 Men a Year (1939) - Chief Pilot Lawson (uncredited)
- Ninotchka (1939) - Soviet lawyer (uncredited)
- Too Busy to Work (1939) - Frazier
- Remember? (1939) - Doctor (scenes deleted)
- The Big Guy (1939) - Judge (uncredited)
- The Man Who Wouldn't Talk (1940) - Officer (uncredited)
- Parole Fixer (1940) - Jergens (uncredited)
- The Man from Dakota (1940) - Union Major Shot Trying to Escape (uncredited)
- Charlie Chan in Panama (1940) - Governor Webster
- Black Friday (1940) - Dr. Warner (uncredited)
- Johnny Apollo (1940) - Stock Exchange Official (uncredited)
- Hot Steel (1940) - John—Bank Director (uncredited)
- Murder in the Air (1940) - Congressman Courtney Rice (uncredited)
- Babies for Sale (1940) - Mr. Edwards
- The Man Who Talked Too Much (1940) - District Attorney Nelson
- Queen of the Mob (1940) - Federal Prosecuting Attorney (uncredited)
- Private Affairs (1940) - Floor Manager (uncredited)
- Andy Hardy Meets Debutante (1940) - Judge (uncredited)
- Manhattan Heartbeat (1940) - Official (uncredited)
- I Want a Divorce (1940) - Minister (uncredited)
- Diamond Frontier (1940) - Judge
- Knute Rockne All American (1940) - Committee Member (uncredited)
- The Quarterback (1940) - Interne (uncredited)
- East of the River (1940) - Commencement Speaker (uncredited)
- Always a Bride (1940) - (scenes deleted)
- Youth Will Be Served (1940) - CCC Camp Major
- Street of Memories (1940) - Judge (uncredited)
- Kiddie Kure (1940, Our Gang short) - Dr. Malcolm Scott
- Mysterious Doctor Satan (1940, Serial) - Col. Bevans
- Behind the News (1940) - Judge #2 (uncredited)
- Where Did You Get That Girl? (1941) - Harper (uncredited)
- Lucky Devils (1941) - Official (uncredited)
- The Face Behind the Mask (1941) - Dr. Alex Beckett (uncredited)
- Arkansas Judge (1941) - Judge Elmer Carruthers
- Ride, Kelly, Ride (1941) - Steward
- Flight from Destiny (1941) - Doctor (uncredited)
- A Man Betrayed (1941) - Prosecutor
- Meet John Doe (1941) - Democrat (uncredited)
- Mr. District Attorney (1941) - Public Defender (uncredited)
- Knockout (1941) - Doctor
- Men of Boys Town (1941) - Dr. Carlton (uncredited)
- Rookies on Parade (1941) - Officer (uncredited)
- Under Age (1941) - Judge
- Hurry, Charlie, Hurry (1941) - Mr. Mortimer Whitley (uncredited)
- Caught in the Draft (1941) - Medical Examiner (uncredited)
- Sergeant York (1941) - Editor (uncredited)
- Mountain Moonlight (1941) - Randolph
- Citadel of Crime (1941) - Minor Role (uncredited)
- Bad Men of Missouri (1941) - Prison Doctor (uncredited)
- Ice-Capades (1941) - Lawyer (uncredited)
- Private Nurse (1941) - Doctor (uncredited)
- Navy Blues (1941) - Rear Admiral (uncredited)
- Lydia (1941) - Dignitary on Podium (uncredited)
- The Night of January 16th (1941) - Hemingway
- The Man Who Came to Dinner (1942) - John
- Sealed Lips (1942) - Warden
- Blue, White and Perfect (1942) - Ship's Doctor (uncredited)
- A Gentleman at Heart (1942) - Beecham - Art Expert (uncredited)
- Pardon My Stripes (1942) - Andrews
- Who Is Hope Schuyler? (1942) - Gillian Stafford
- Fingers at the Window (1942) - Hospital Doctor (uncredited)
- Drums of the Congo (1942) - Col. S.C. Robinson
- This Gun for Hire (1942) - Police Captain at Train Station (uncredited)
- Small Town Deb (1942) - Mr. Blakely
- Syncopation (1942) - Goodwill's Attorney (uncredited)
- Private Buckaroo (1942) - Maj. Evans (uncredited)
- The Loves of Edgar Allan Poe (1942) - Dr. Moran
- Girl Trouble (1942) - Lehman
- Gentleman Jim (1942) - Bank President McInnes (uncredited)
- Seven Miles from Alcatraz (1942) - Prison Warden (uncredited)
- Ice-Capades Revue (1942) - Otis (uncredited)
- Shadow of a Doubt (1943) - Mr. Green (uncredited)
- Air Force (1943) - Doctor Attending Quincannon (uncredited)
- Flight for Freedom (1943) - Rear Admiral Gage (uncredited)
- Submarine Alert (1943) - Commanding Officer at Finish (uncredited)
- A Stranger in Town (1943) - Supreme Court Justice (uncredited)
- Yanks Ahoy (1943) - Dr. Hadley (uncredited)
- Johnny Come Lately (1943) - Winterbottom
- Minesweeper (1943) - Officer (uncredited)
- The Song of Bernadette (1943) - Mr. Jones (uncredited)
- O, My Darling Clementine (1943) - Hartfield
- Standing Room Only (1944) - Guest at Ritchie Home (uncredited)
- The Racket Man (1944) - Doctor (uncredited)
- Ladies Courageous (1944) - (uncredited)
- Buffalo Bill (1944) - Doctor (uncredited)
- Follow the Boys (1944) - Taylor (uncredited)
- Jamboree (1944) - Sam Smith
- Christmas Holiday (1944) - Room Clerk (uncredited)
- Louisiana Hayride (1944) - Studio Producer (uncredited)
- Strange Affair (1944) - Dr. Parrish (uncredited)
- Heavenly Days (1944) - Vice President Wallace (uncredited)
- The Missing Juror (1944) - Prison Warden (uncredited)
- The Princess and the Pirate (1944) - Captain of the King's Ship (uncredited)
- And Now Tomorrow (1944) - Mr. Raines (uncredited)
- Faces in the Fog (1944) - Fairbanks, Juror (uncredited)
- Youth on Trial (1945) - Commissioner Collins (uncredited)
- Conflict (1945) - Phillips
- Incendiary Blonde (1945) - Mr. Zweigler (uncredited)
- Two Years Before the Mast (1946) - Blake (uncredited)
