= Ethelmary Oakland =

American actress

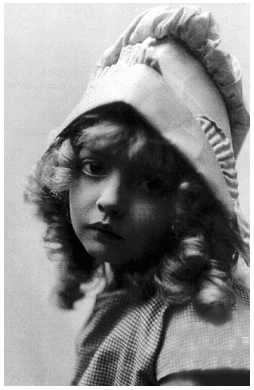
Ethelmary Oakland

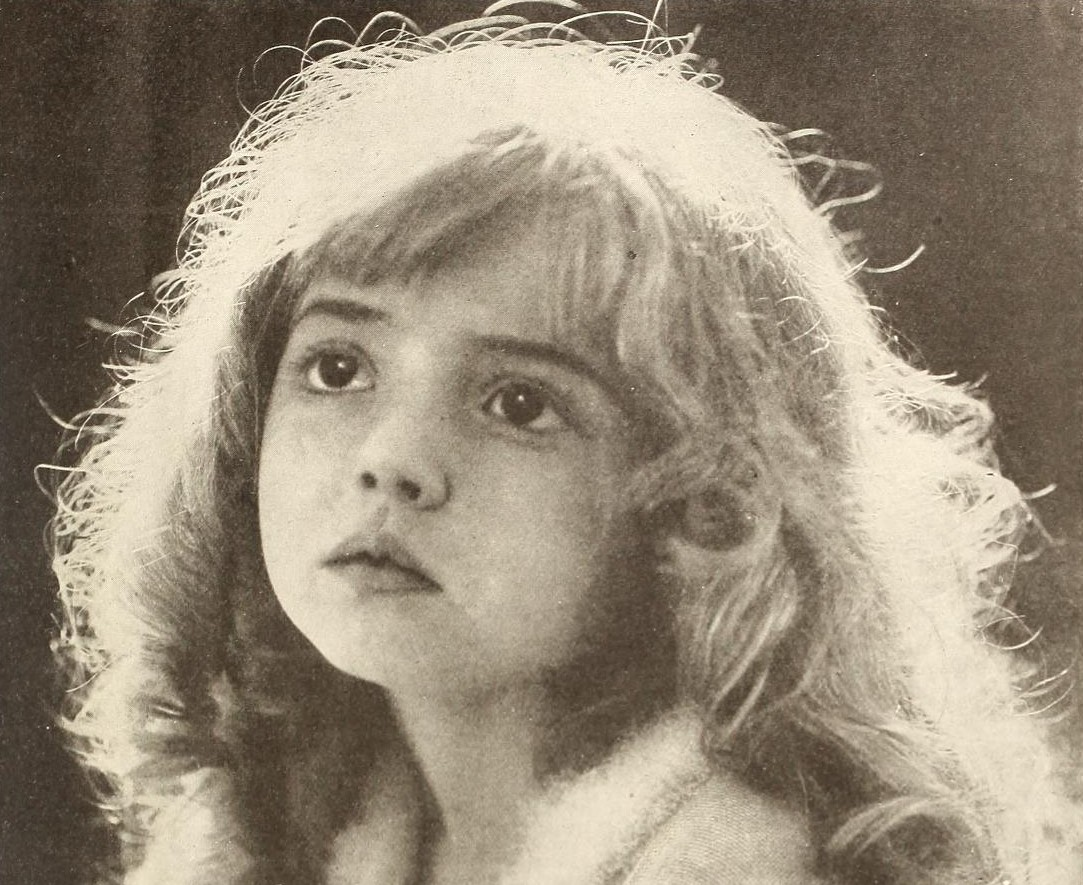
Ethelmary Oakland portrait in 1916

Ethelmary Oakland (30 July 1909 – 2 December 1999) was an American actress as a silent film child star. She was born in Indiana and started her film career at four years old. She also trained in dance with Anna Pavlova. In 1915, the Buffalo Times noted her "portrayer of child screen roles is unrivalled". Her salary in 1915 ranged from $100 to $400 per week (equivalent to $3,100 to $12,400 per week in 2024). Oakland posed for a portrait by Emil Fuchs that was displayed in public exhibits and a gallery in 1916.

She was featured in such Thanhouser Film Corporation's films as The World and the Woman (1916) with Jeanne Eagels; and Always in the Way (1915) with Mary Miles Minter and Charlotte Shelby. In 1917 Oakland appeared with Jack Pickford in The Dummy produced by Famous Players–Lasky. In 1917, Oakland played the leading role in The Little Rebel.

Oakland left the movie industry in the late 1910s, and went on to become a librarian at Seton Hall University.

== Filmography ==
- Always in the Way (1915)
- Hearts of Men (1915)
- John Brewster's Wife (1916)
- The Shine Girl (1916)
- The World and the Woman (1916)
- Divorce and the Daughter (1916)
- The Dummy (1917)
