= On Trial (1928 film) =

1928 film

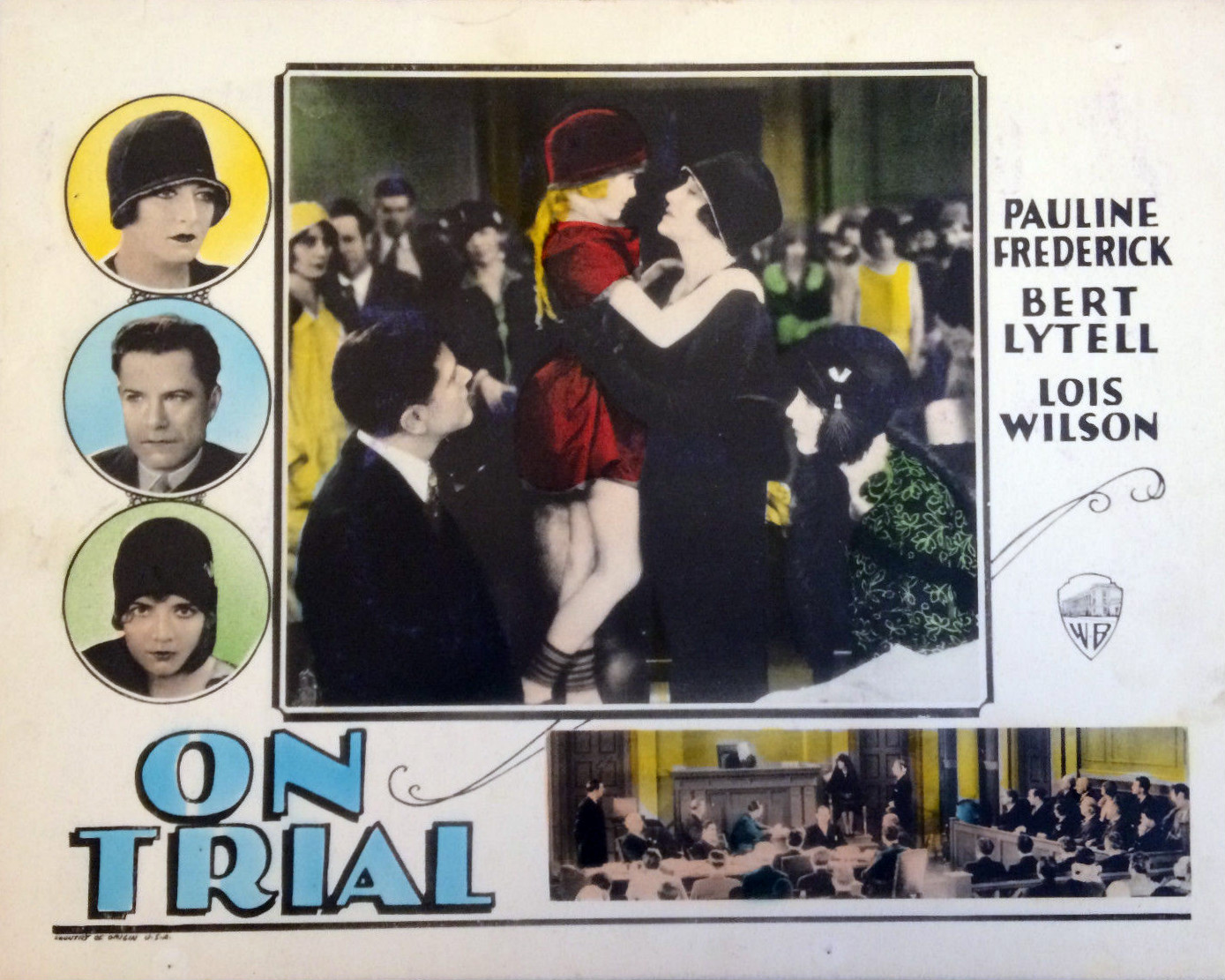
- Lobby card
- Directed by: Archie Mayo
- Written by: Max Pollock
- Screenplay by: Robert Lord (& titles); Max Pollack
- Based on: On Trial (1914 play) by Elmer Rice
- Starring: Pauline Frederick; Bert Lytell; Lois Wilson
- Cinematography: Byron Haskin
- Edited by: Tommy Pratt
- Production company: Warner Bros. Pictures
- Distributed by: Warner Bros. Pictures
- Release dates: November 14, 1928 (sound); December 29, 1928 (silent)
- Running time: 91 minutes
- Country: United States
- Language: English
- Budget: $130,000
- Box office: $1,454,000

On Trial is a 1928 American talking drama film produced and distributed by Warner Bros. Pictures, and directed by Archie Mayo. The film starred Pauline Frederick, Lois Wilson, Bert Lytell, Holmes Herbert, and Jason Robards. The film is based on the 1914 Broadway play of the same name by Elmer Rice. A silent version of the film was also released on December 29, 1928.

The first film was released in 1917, starring Barbara Castleton, Sidney Ainsworth, and Mary McAllister. It was remade again in 1939 with John Litel, Margaret Lindsay, and Edward Norris.

== Plot ==
Robert Strickland, a respected businessman, finds himself at the center of a sensational murder trial in New York. He stands accused of killing his friend Gerald Trask, a wealthy man to whom Strickland owed $20,000—a loan taken during a time of business trouble.

According to the prosecuting attorney, the motive is clear: Strickland had just returned from Cleveland with the exact sum in cash and knew Trask would be placing the money in the wall safe of his home. The prosecution claims that Strickland repaid the loan merely as a ruse to gain access to the house, then returned with an accomplice to rob it—killing Trask when the robbery was interrupted by Trask's wife, Joan. The accomplice, it is claimed, escaped with the cash.

Strickland shocks the court by confessing to the crime, insisting that he alone is responsible and refusing to allow his defense to proceed. But his attorney pushes forward, convinced that Strickland is protecting someone else.

Adding to the mystery is the disappearance of Strickland's wife, May, who has not been seen since the night of the murder. Joan Trask takes the witness stand and recounts the events: Gerald had returned home late that night, and shortly after, she was attacked by a shadowy intruder. Trask was killed during the scuffle, and his secretary, Glover, struck Strickland with a cane and detained him until the police arrived.

The next morning, despite Strickland's protests, the defense calls his young daughter Doris to the stand. Innocently but precisely, Doris recounts overhearing her mother make a mysterious phone call to a railroad station inquiring about a missing purse left in Long Branch earlier that day. Afterward, May warned her daughter to say nothing about it.

Doris then recalls her father returning home and later introducing Trask to May, who claimed to have never met him before. But Doris remembers that Trask had given her father a card with his Long Branch address, inviting him to come fishing.

Soon, the station agent from Long Branch sends over a purse left behind—May's purse. She denies it's hers, but Robert recognizes it immediately. Under pressure, May concocts a flimsy story, but it quickly unravels when it's revealed that she spent the day with Trask in Long Branch. Enraged by the revelation, Strickland had taken his revolver and left the house, ultimately confronting and killing Trask.

May eventually appears in court as a surprise witness, having been located by the defense. Her testimony finally sheds light on the backstory: Years before her marriage, Trask had wooed her under false pretenses, even promising marriage. They spent a night together in a hotel, only for her to discover later that he was already married. On the day of the murder, Trask had threatened to reveal their past relationship unless she visited him again. Fearing scandal, May complied.

Despite this emotional testimony, one juror, Turnbull, remains unconvinced, insisting Strickland's real motive was theft. However, upon reopening the case, the defense attorney scrutinizes Glover's testimony and reveals inconsistencies. Under pressure, Glover breaks down and confesses: he was the one who stole the $20,000.

With the truth finally out, Strickland is acquitted and returns home to be reunited with May and Doris. In a touching conclusion, Joan Trask—aware of her late husband's reputation as a womanizer—extends her sincere wishes for the Strickland family's happiness.

== Cast ==
- Pauline Frederick as Joan Trask
- Bert Lytell as Robert Strickland
- Lois Wilson as May Strickland
- Holmes Herbert as Gerald Trask
- Richard Tucker as Prosecuting Attorney
- Jason Robards Sr. as Defense Attorney
- Franklin Pangborn as Turnbull
- Fred Kelsey as Clerk
- Vondell Darr as Doris Strickland
- Edmund Breese as Judge
- Edward Martindel as Dr. Morgan

== Reception ==
According to Warner Bros records, the film earned $1,089,000 domestically and $365,000 in the rest of the world.

== Preservation status ==
Trailer for On Trial (1928)

The 1928 film version of On Trial is now considered lost. However, Vitaphone soundtrack discs for the film survive and are housed at the UCLA Film and Television Archive and British Film Institute. The film's trailer also survives.

== See also ==
- List of early sound feature films (1926–1929)
- List of lost films
