= Dummer =

Dummer or Dümmer may refer to:

== Places ==
- Dummer, Hampshire, a parish and village in Hampshire, England
- Dummer, New Hampshire, a town in Coös County, New Hampshire, United States
- Dummer, Saskatchewan, a hamlet in Caledonia No. 99 Rural Municipality, Saskatchewan, Canada
- Dummerston, Vermont, a town in Windham County, Vermont, United States
- Dümmer, a lake in southern Lower Saxony, Germany
- Dümmer See, a lake in Mecklenburg-Vorpommern, Germany
- Dümmer, Mecklenburg-Vorpommern, a municipality in the district of Ludwigslust, Germany
- Douro-Dummer, a township in central-eastern Ontario, Canada
- Fort Dummer, a British fort built in 1724 in Vermont

== People ==
- Dummer (surname)

== Other ==
- Dummer's War (c. 1721–1725), a series of battles between the British and French over control of northern New England
- The Governor's Academy, formerly Governor Dummer Academy, a private preparatory school in the village of Byfield, Newbury, Massachusetts, United States

== See also ==
- Dumber (disambiguation)
