= Mandume, Angola =

Mandume Dumbo
- Village
- Location in Angola
- Coordinates: 14°03′S 17°26′E
- Country: Angola
- Province: Bié Province
- Municipality: Chitembo
- Commune: Mumbue
- Elevation: 1,457 m (4,780 ft)
- Time zone: UTC+1 (WAT)
- Area code: (+244) 48

Mandume (Dumbo) is a village in Bié Province, Angola, in southwestern Africa. It sits at an elevation of 1,481 metres (4,859 ft) in a seasonally swampy area on a tributary of the Cuelei River.

It was a strong point of the People's Movement for the Liberation of Angola during the Angolan War of Independence.
