= The Shine Girl =

1916 film directed by William Parke

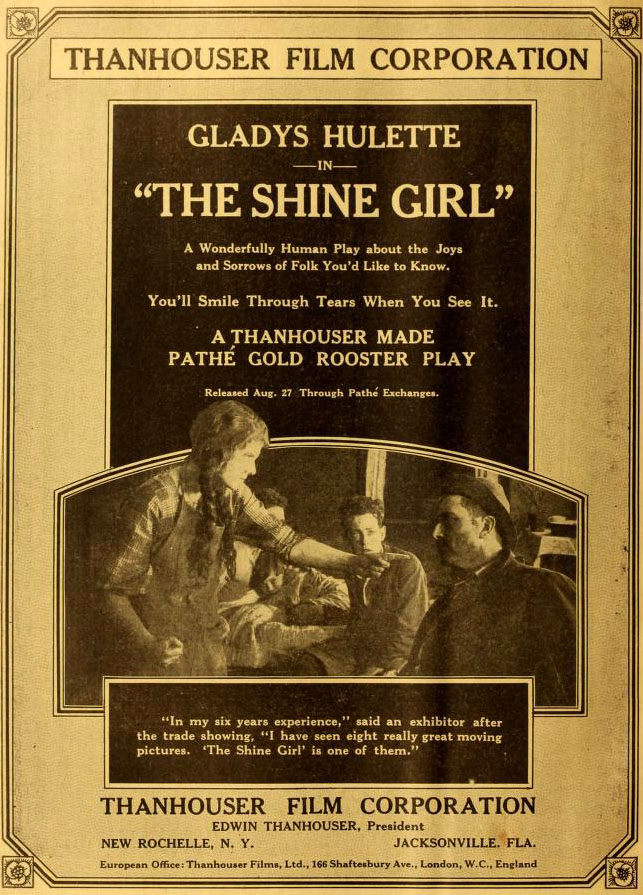
- lobby poster
- Directed by: William Parke; Gordon Hollingshead
- Written by: Agnes Christine Johnston
- Produced by: Thanhouser Film Corp.
- Starring: Gladys Hulette
- Cinematography: John Bauman
- Distributed by: Pathé Exchange
- Release date: August 27, 1916
- Running time: 5 reels
- Country: United States
- Language: Silent (English intertitles)

The Shine Girl is a lost 1916 American silent film drama directed by William Parke and starring Gladys Hulette. It was produced by the Thanhouser Company and was distributed by Pathé Exchange.

== Cast ==
- Gladys Hulette as The shine girl
- Wayne Arey as Judge Clayton
- Kathryn Adams as Margaret Kenyon
- Ethelmary Oakland as Baby Kenyon
- John Cook as John Kenyon
- Blanche Davenport
