= Vondell Darr =

American actress

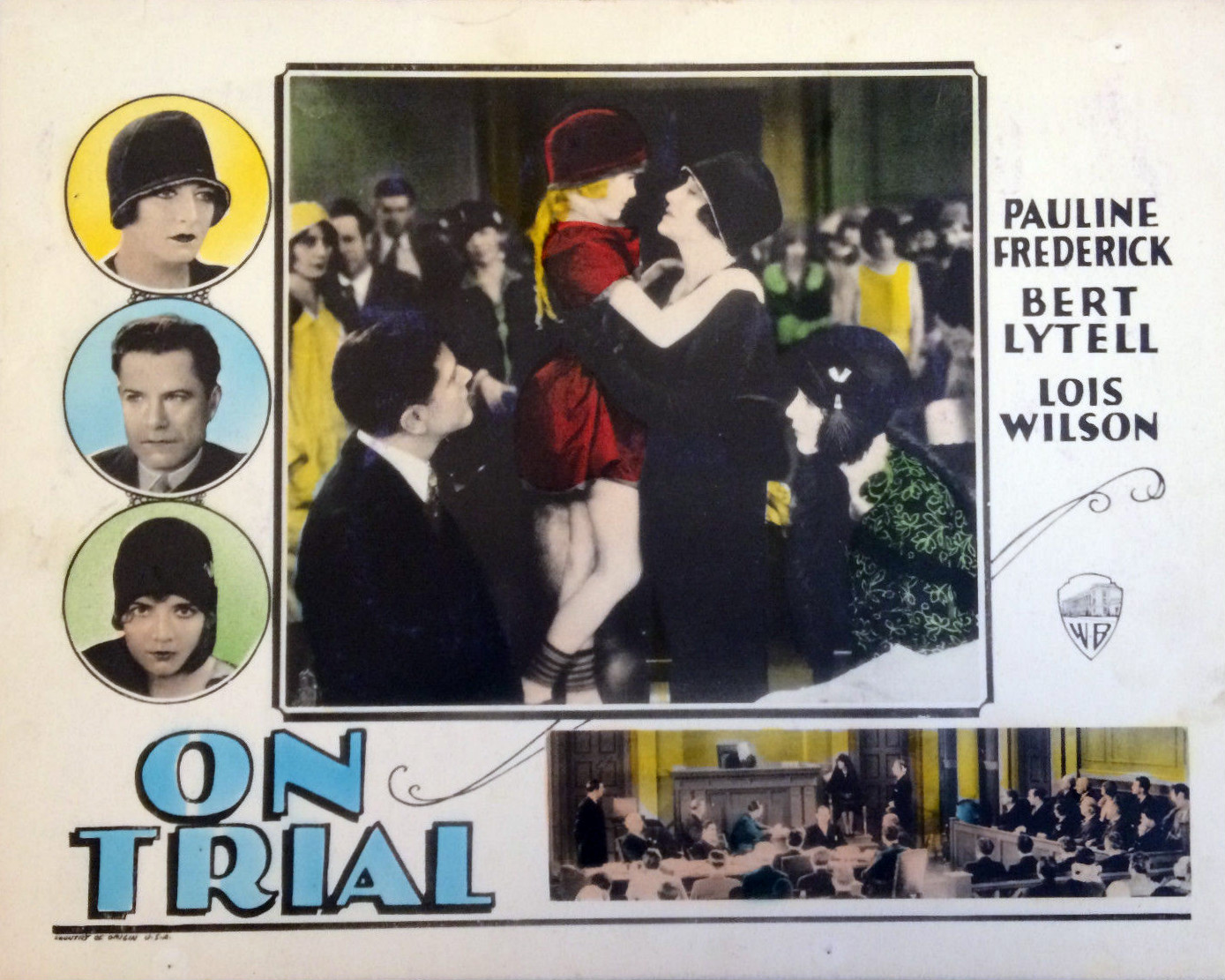
- Lobby card for On Trial (1928), Darr at center
- Born: April 18, 1919; Los Angeles, California, United States
- Died: September 10, 2012 (aged 93); Los Angeles, California, United States
- Occupation: Actress
- Years active: 1924–1941

Vondell Darr Wilson (April 18, 1919 – September 10, 2012) was an American actress. She achieved success in the late 1920s as a child actor and later played bit parts in her adult years. Her last role was in The Chocolate Soldier in 1941. Darr died on September 10, 2012.

== Early years ==
Vondell Darr was born in Los Angeles to Ralph Darr and Homa Dupree Darr. She attended the Normandie Grammar School and the Ambassador School for Girls.

== Personal life ==
Darr met her husband, Fred Wilson, in high school, and the pair lived in Encino, Rancho Mirage and Lake Arrowhead during their marriage. The couple had three children.

== Partial filmography ==
- The City That Never Sleeps (1924) - Baby Molly
- One Glorious Night (1924) - Mary
- Border Vengeance (1925) - Bumps Jackson
- The Pony Express (1925) - Baby
- The Golden Cocoon (1925)
- The Blind Goddess (1926)
- Silence (1926) - Flower girl
- On Trial (1928) - Doris Strickland
- The Dummy (1929) - Peggy Meredith
- That Certain Age (1938) - Friend
- Andy Hardy Gets Spring Fever (1939) - Prompter (uncredited)
- Scouts to the Rescue (1939) - Mary Scanlon
- Strike Up the Band (1940) - Indian Love Lyrics Student (uncredited)
- Little Nellie Kelly (1940) - Girl Dancing with Boy at Dance (uncredited)
- More Trifles of Importance (1941) (short) - Patient
- Men of Boys Town (1941) - Agnes, Whitey's Marysport Dance Partner (uncredited)
- The Chocolate Soldier (1941) - Autograph Seeker (uncredited)
