= Divorce and the Daughter =

1916 film by Frederic Richard Sullivan

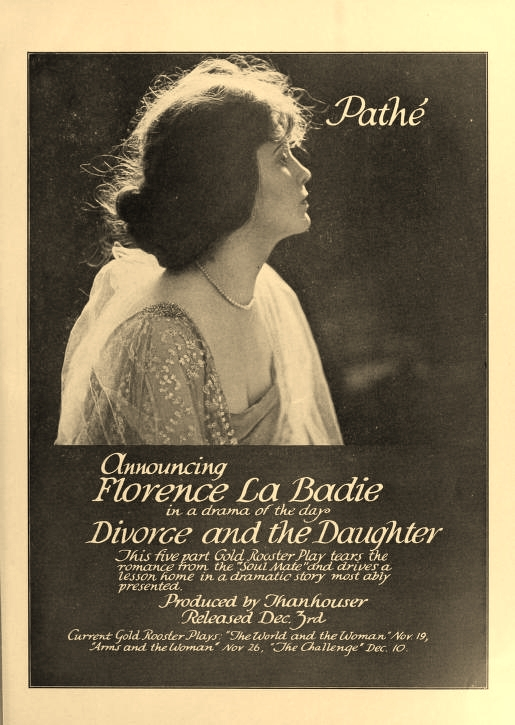
- Ad for film featuring Florence La Badie
- Directed by: Frederic Richard Sullivan
- Screenplay by: Agnes Johnston
- Starring: Florence La Badie; Edwin Stanley; Kathryn Adams
- Cinematography: Charles W. Hoffman
- Production company: Thanhouser Film Corporation
- Distributed by: Pathé Exchange
- Release date: December 1916
- Running time: Five reels
- Country: United States
- Language: Silent

Divorce and the Daughter is a 1916 American silent drama film directed by Frederic Richard Sullivan. The film stars Florence La Badie, Edwin Stanley, Ethelmary Oakland and Kathryn Adams.

== Plot ==
Alicia is a poor girl living in the city with her family. When her father receives an inheritance, he is able to follow his dream of becoming an artist and moves his family near an artist's colony in the country. There he falls prey to a scheming widow, and he and his wife separate. Alicia, meanwhile, has become involved with a young man who is the widow's accomplice, and she throws over her former suitor, Dr. John Osborne. The young man is a proponent of free love, but he gets a little too free with Alicia and she beans him with a small statuette. She goes running back to her doctor sweetheart, and her parents decide to reconcile, since their separation obviously isn't doing their children any good.

== Cast ==
- Florence La Badie - Alicia
- Edwin Stanley - Dr. John Osborne
- Kathryn Adams - Mrs. Cameron
- Sam Niblack - Herbert Rawlins
- J. H. Gilmour - The father
- Zenaide Williams - The mother
- Ethelmary Oakland - The children
- Arthur Le Vien - The children

== Preservation status ==
- A print is preserved in the BFI National Film and Television Archive, London.
