= Dum =

Dum or DUM may refer to:

== Films ==
- Dum (2003 Hindi film), India
- Dum (2003 Tamil film), India
- Dum (2016 film), an Indian Malayalam-language film
- Happy (2006 film), an Indian Telugu-language film, titled Dum in Hindi

== Other uses ==
- dum, Middle Dutch, West Germanic dialects, 1150–1500, ISO 639 language codes
- DUM, IATA code for Pinang Kampai Airport, Dumai, Riau, Indonesia
- Dum pukht, an Indian slow-cooking technique
  - Dum biryani, a rice dish cooked with that technique
- Sascha Dum (born 1986), German former footballer

== See also ==
- Dam (disambiguation)
- Dumb (disambiguation)
- Dum Dum (disambiguation)
