= Emmett Brown =

Back to the Future character

- Back to the Future character
- Christopher Lloyd as Dr. Emmett Brown
- First appearance: Back to the Future (1985)
- Created by: Robert Zemeckis; Bob Gale
- Portrayed by: Christopher Lloyd
- Voiced by: Dan Castellaneta (The Animated Series); Christopher Lloyd (The Game; Lego Dimensions); James Arnold Taylor (Young, The Game); Roger Bart (The Musical: Original Cast Recording)

In-universe information
- Full name: Emmett Lathrop Brown
- Nicknames: Doc Brown; Doc
- Occupation: Scientist

Dr. Emmett Lathrop Brown, commonly referred to as "Doc Brown" or simply "Doc", is a fictional scientist in the Back to the Future franchise. He was created by Robert Zemeckis and Bob Gale. First appearing in the 1985 film Back to the Future, he is an eccentric mad scientist and friend to the protagonist Marty McFly. In the franchise, he invents a time machine using a DMC DeLorean. He is portrayed by Christopher Lloyd in all three films and in the television series and was loosely inspired by Leopold Stokowski and Albert Einstein. Lloyd also voiced Brown on the 2010 videogame Back to the Future: The Game and the 2015 videogame Lego Dimensions. He is also voiced by Dan Castellaneta in the animated sections of the television series.

In Back to the Future, he introduces Marty McFly to the DeLorean time machine that he invented, which results in Marty being accidentally transported back to the year 1955. He returned alongside Marty in Back to the Future Part II, in which they travel into the future to 2015. In Back to the Future Part III, he is accidentally transported back to 1885 and there builds another time machine using a steam engine locomotive.

Emmett Brown has been ranked by critics as one of the greatest film characters of the 1980s and is regarded as Lloyd's most memorable film role. He was listed by Empire as one of the greatest film characters of all time.

Christopher Lloyd speaks at length about his experiences portraying Doc Brown in his memoir In My Own Time releasing October 2026.

== Development ==
=== Casting ===
During development of Back to the Future, several actors were considered for the role, including Jeff Goldblum, John Lithgow, Dudley Moore, Ron Silver, Robin Williams, John Cleese, Mandy Patinkin, Gene Hackman, James Woods, and Mark Mothersbaugh. Jeff Goldblum auditioned for the part but lost out when Christopher Lloyd was cast as Emmett Brown. Devo co-founder Mark Mothersbaugh also recalled being approached by Robert Zemeckis and Steven Spielberg for the role, but turned it down because he was not interested in acting. Producer Neil Canton suggested Lloyd to Bob Gale and Zemeckis, as he had previously worked with him on The Adventures of Buckaroo Banzai Across the 8th Dimension. Lloyd initially turned it down as he was not familiar with Zemeckis, but was encouraged by his wife to reconsider. Despite his reluctance, Zemeckis knew immediately that he was the right actor for the role, commenting "He just had everything the character needed." Lloyd was significantly younger than his character, being 46 years old at the time of filming Back to the Future, so the makeup artists made him look older. The Back to the Future novels state that Emmett Brown was born in 1920, placing him at the age of 65 in 1985. The character's appearance was inspired by Albert Einstein and Leopold Stokowski. Lloyd recalled discussing his inspirations with Zemeckis, after he was influenced by an album cover depicting Stokowski in front of the cosmos with white hair.

=== Production ===
The script for Back to the Future was written by Gale and Zemeckis. They wrote two drafts and pitched the second draft. Although the script was rejected more than 40 times, Steven Spielberg showed interest in producing the film at Amblin Entertainment. Sid Sheinberg, the head of Universal Pictures also liked the story but wanted to make certain changes. Originally Emmett was given the title "Professor Brown" but Sheinberg thought viewers would dislike it and changed it to "Doc Brown". He also rejected the idea that Emmett should have a pet chimpanzee, so this was changed to a dog, because he believed that "no movie with a chimpanzee ever made any money". In the second draft of the script, Doc's time machine was a "time chamber" similar to a refrigerator, which he would have to transport in the back of his truck. Zemeckis conceived an alternative solution by making the time machine mobile and incorporating it into a vehicle. Storyboard artist Andrew Probert said that Doc Brown's car was designed to be a DeLorean, but Gale had to reject various offers from automotive companies that wanted to be included in the film. At one point, a member of the production team responsible for product placement approached Gale with a deal from the Ford Motor Company which suggested that Doc Brown should drive a Ford Mustang. Gale rebuffed the offer stating, "Doc Brown does not drive a f-cking Mustang". For the character's signature expression, Gale stated that Zemeckis had come up with the idea of using "Great Scott!". He initially thought Doc Brown would use the phrase "Great Caesar's Ghost!" because it was from a Superman television series they had grown up watching. The phrase "Great Scott!" was spoken by another character that he could not remember.

Filming for Back to the Future took place in late 1984 and early 1985 in a variety of locations. The scenes involving Doc Brown's 1955 mansion home, which in the film is located at the fictional address of 1640 Riverside Drive in Hill Valley, California, were shot at the Gamble House in Pasadena. The Gamble House's carriage house was used for Doc Brown's garage, which by 1985, has become his residence after the mansion is destroyed. The garage's exterior was replicated for the scenes. For the interior of his home, the Robert R. Blacker House was used for filming. When Eric Stoltz was replaced by Michael J. Fox for the part of Marty McFly in the sixth week of filming, Lloyd was initially worried by the casting change, as he was concerned about having to reshoot the scenes. Despite these reservations, he found that he had a natural chemistry with Fox that meant it was easy to work with him.

In Back to the Future Part III, Doc Brown develops a relationship with Clara Clayton in 1885, a character portrayed by Mary Steenburgen. Despite being an experienced actor of 15 years, Lloyd needed to speak to Zemeckis before filming a scene in which he kisses her, to explain that he had never before had an onscreen kiss. Gale opined that Lloyd was effective in the part of a romantic male lead. Zemeckis said that during production of the first film, they decided to write a scene to explain Doc Brown's disinterest in women, in which he is forced to choose between a relationship and science and ends up choosing science. The scene was eventually left out of the second film. Zemeckis explained that the third film illustrates the character's growth from an eccentric to a man capable of falling in love: "he gets in touch with that boyish, romantic, innocent part of himself".

== Characteristics ==
"Doc himself is a very positive person. He's always in crisis, he's always worried that he'll do something that might disrupt the space/time continuum, which would be a calamity for the entire universe. It weighs on his soul. So he constantly has to be one step ahead of himself — and he has a lot of fun doing it even though he gets himself in some nerve-wracking situations."

— Christopher Lloyd discussing Emmett Brown

Emmett Lathrop Brown is a white-haired scientist who is called "Doc" by his teenage friend Marty McFly. He was created as a mad scientist archetype. Despite his many failed inventions, he successfully makes time travel possible, by building a time machine out of a DMC DeLorean. Gale stated that Doc Brown met Marty when the teenager was about 14 years old. Marty sneaked into Doc's lab after learning that he was considered a lunatic and was discovered there by Doc. Marty considered Doc to be cool and this resulted in Doc hiring Marty as his part-time lab assistant. Doc was born into a wealthy family and in 1955 lives in a mansion, but spends thirty years burning through his wealth to realise his vision of time travel. By 1985, his mansion has been destroyed by fire, so he subsequently resides in the mansion's garage. Doc's garage is packed with gadgets and he has an impressive clock collection. Although he is American and a baseball fan, Doc's father was German and his family name was Von Braun.

Doc Brown's friendship with Marty is a central aspect of the film trilogy. Marty typically seeks out his friend each time he finds himself in a perilous situation, knowing that Doc will provide a solution. Doc not only takes the role of Marty's sidekick, but also provides much of the comic relief. He is shown to be selfless by nature, often putting his life in danger to help his friend because he believes in doing what is right. Whenever he makes a new discovery, he typically expresses his astonishment by exclaiming the catchphrase "Great Scott!". Lloyd described Doc Brown as a positive character who is inventive and energetic. He said that he loved the character's passion and excitement in discovering new things. Doc's positive influence on Marty encourages him to mentor his father George in 1955 and influence him into becoming a novelist, which in turn results in the success of the McFly family in 1985. This positivity is articulated in Doc's line, "If you put your mind to it, you can accomplish anything", which Marty later repeats to George. Gale said that Doc's friendship with Marty is based on mutual respect, as both characters find a connection with each other being rebellious by nature. He explained, "Doc thinks, 'Hey, Marty is a kid who maybe I can give him something, he's the son I never had. He's inquisitive, he doesn't judge me'."

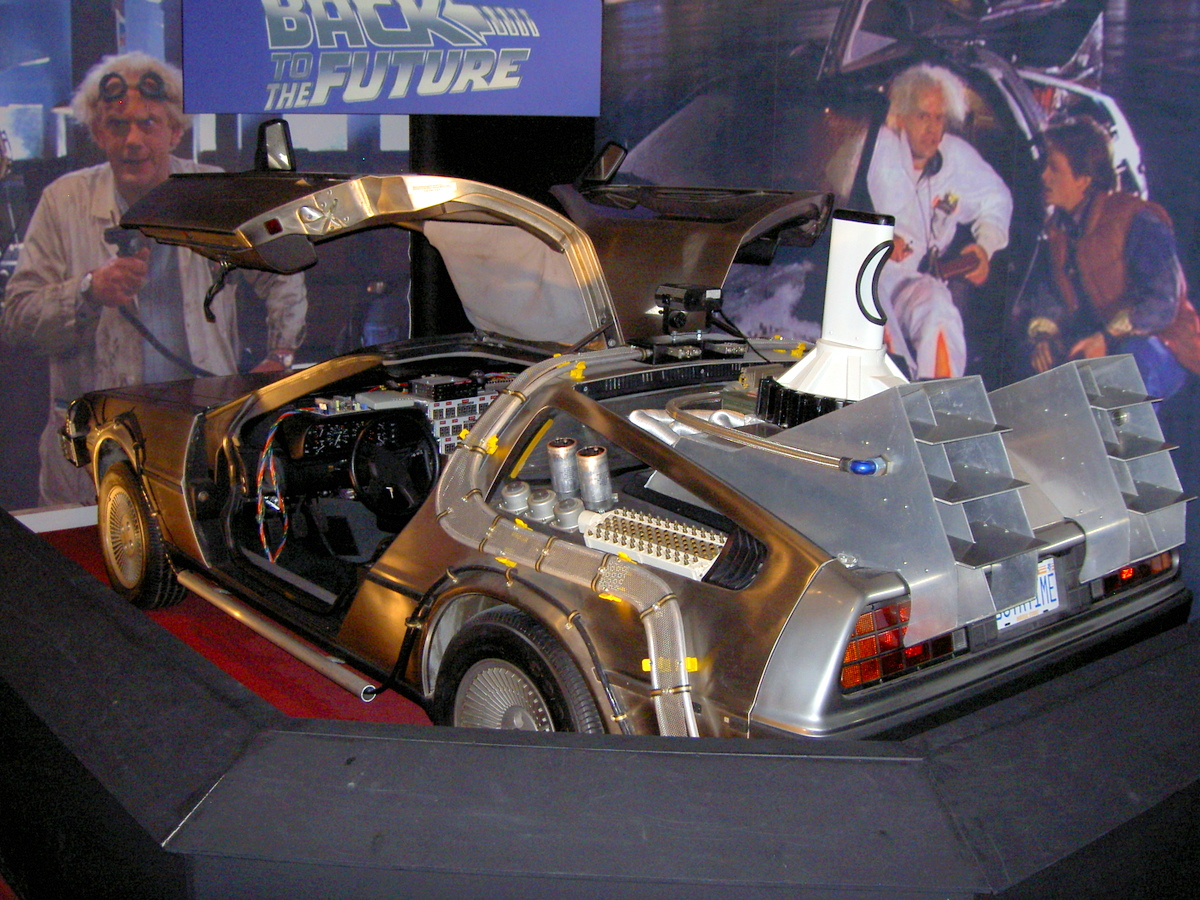
The DeLorean time machine displayed with images of Emmett Brown and Marty McFly

Doc Brown is eccentric but also a genius. He tells Marty that he invented time travel in November 1955 by accident. While trying to hang a clock in his bathroom by standing on the toilet, he slipped, banged his head and while he was knocked out had a vision of the flux capacitor, the component that makes time travel possible. In 1985, he uses stolen plutonium to create a "nuclear reaction to generate 1.21 gigawatts of electricity" to power the DeLorean and enable it to time travel. Upon realising that plutonium is impossible to obtain in 1955, the younger Doc decides that the only other way to power the DeLorean is with a bolt of lightning. When conducting his science experiments, Doc Brown often uses his pet dogs as test subjects. In 1985, he tests the DeLorean by sending his dog Einstein one minute into the future. When Marty meets up with the younger Doc Brown in 1955, his dog is named Copernicus and is used as a test subject for Doc's "brain wave analyzer". When Doc and Marty travel to 2015, he leaves Einstein in a "suspended animation kennel".

When Doc Brown meets Clara Clayton in 1885, he finds romance with a character who is similarly eccentric and interested in science. Doc starts a family with Clara and they have two sons, Jules and Verne. He eventually builds another time machine out of a steam locomotive and together they set off on new adventures.

== Other Back to the Future appearances ==
Doc Brown, as he appeared in Back to the Future: The Animated Series.

- Back to the Future: The Animated Series, a sequel to the film trilogy, features Dan Castellaneta as the voice of Doc Brown, with Christopher Lloyd appearing in live-action segments.
- Lloyd filmed new material for Back to the Future the Ride, directed by Douglas Trumbull. The ride serves as a sequel to the films, following Doc Brown and his founding of the 'Institute of Future Technology'. He invites tourists to embark on a time-traveling adventure in his newly made eight-passenger DeLorean. The ride was included on the first film's 2009 DVD re-release and on the trilogy's 2010 Blu-ray set.
- Doc Brown appeared in the Back to the Future comic series published by Harvey Comics, which detailed further adventures of the animated series.
- Lloyd voiced Doc Brown in Back to the Future: The Game, developed by Telltale Games as a sequel to the film series.
- Doc Brown appeared in the Back to the Future comic series published by IDW Publishing, which detailed Doc's and Marty's adventures before and after the events depicted in the films.
- Lloyd reprised the role of Doc Brown in the 2015 direct-to-video short film Doc Brown Saves the World, which reveals that he has returned to his time at some point after the events of Back to the Future Part III and established his own scientific company Doc Brown Enterprises. He erased the future witnessed in Back to the Future Part II as the various inventions of that time led to mass obesity and Griff Tannen triggering a nuclear holocaust using a restored DeLorean time machine.
- In February 2020, a stage musical adaptation of the first film premiered at the Manchester Opera House in the UK, starring Roger Bart in the role of Doc Brown. The production was forced to close early due to the shutting down of performance venues at the onset of the COVID-19 pandemic, but was revived for a West End run at the Adelphi Theatre from August 2021, with Bart reprising the Doc Brown role. In 2023, Cory English took over the role at the Adelphi Theatre. The show transferred to Broadway in June 2023, with Bart once again reprising his role as Doc Brown.
- In 2023, Lloyd appeared as Doc Brown in Busted's 20th Anniversary & Greatest Hits Tour.

== Other appearances ==
- Lloyd appeared as Doc Brown in the 1990 Warner Bros. program The Earth Day Special.
- Lloyd voices an animated Doc Brown as a cameo in The Simpsons Ride, in a reference to the closure of the Back to the Future ride.
- Lloyd voices Doc Brown in the Robot Chicken episodes "Casablankman 2" and "Eaten by Cats".
- Doc Brown appeared in the Universal Studios show, Bill and Ted's Excellent Halloween Adventure giving Bill and Ted a ride back to the future due to Ted misplacing their own time machine.
- Lloyd voices an animated egg Doc Brown in a 2011 episode of Element Animation's The Crack!, "The Epic Adventure", mistaking an egg named Jason for Marty and bringing him back in time, where they meet a younger Jason.
- Lloyd made a cameo appearance as Doc Brown in the 2014 film A Million Ways to Die in the West, where Albert Stark sees him covertly working on the DeLorean in a barn.
- Lloyd voiced Doc Brown in the 2015 video game Lego Dimensions, as well as playing the character in a live-action advertisement for the game.
- Doc Brown and Marty appeared on Jimmy Kimmel Live! on the October 21, 2015 show, set on the day that the characters traveled to in Part II.
- Doc Brown appears alongside Marty in an 2016 episode of Henry Danger “Ox Pox” portrayed by Frank Simons.
- Lloyd played himself portraying Doc Brown in the 2016 Funny or Die satire film Donald Trump's The Art of the Deal: The Movie.
- A Lego minifigure of Emmett Brown appears in The Lego Movie 2: The Second Part when Rex Dangervest conjures up various Time Machine parts to create his own, including the DeLorean.
- Lloyd appeared as Doc Brown in the Discovery original, Expedition Unknown show, Expedition: Back to the Future released on March 15, 2021.
- Doc Brown appears alongside Marty in the 2024 video game Funko Fusion.
- Backstory materials for the Stardust Racers roller coaster at Universal Epic Universe point towards Doc Brown being the one to help arrange the comet races when he found himself in the interdimensional hub of Celestial Park, with the trains for the coasters being equipped with flux capacitors.
- Lloyd briefly appears as Doc Brown in the 2018 commercial for the Fiat 500X car, which also features other references to Back to the Future.

== Reception and influence ==
Emmett Brown has been described by critics as Lloyd's greatest or most iconic film role. Rotten Tomatoes described the role as Lloyd's "biggest legacy". MovieWeb named Doc Brown as "one of the greatest movie characters of all time" and the "greatest sidekick in film history". GamesRadar+ listed Doc Brown as one of the greatest movie characters of the 1980s alongside Marty, particularly praising their onscreen chemistry. He was selected by Empire magazine as one of the greatest movie characters of all time.

Paste noted that the character was responsible for reviving the phrase "Great Scott!", which returned as an internet meme, having fallen out of use since the 1800s. Rick Sanchez of the American animated series Rick and Morty (voiced by Justin Roiland) began as a parody of Doc Brown. In September 2021, Christopher Lloyd portrayed Sanchez himself in a series of promotional clips for the series' two-part fifth season finale, alongside Jaeden Martell as Morty Smith (also voiced by Roiland in the series), a character inspired by Marty.
