= One Glorious Night =

1924 film

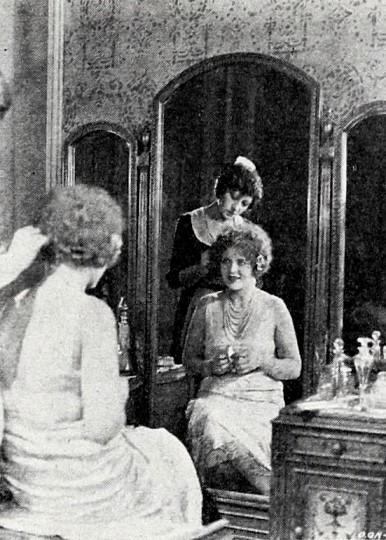
- Still with Phyllis Haver
- Directed by: Scott R. Dunlap
- Written by: J. Grubb Alexander; Harvey Gates
- Starring: Elaine Hammerstein; Alan Roscoe; Phyllis Haver
- Production company: Columbia Pictures
- Distributed by: Columbia Pictures
- Release date: December 1, 1924
- Running time: 56 minutes
- Country: United States
- Language: Silent (English intertitles)

One Glorious Night is a 1924 American silent drama film directed by Scott R. Dunlap and starring Elaine Hammerstein, Alan Roscoe, and Phyllis Haver.

== Plot ==
As described in a film magazine review, Mary Stevens jilts Kenneth McLane and marries Chester James, a wealthy clubman. His mother lives with them and governs them as she controls the finances. She forbids Mary to have any children. After leaving the house with Mary, Chester returns to his home and deserts Mary. Mary has a child, which is adopted by Kenneth who has become wealthy. Years later he finds Mary and marries her.

== Cast ==
- Elaine Hammerstein as Mary Stevens
- Alan Roscoe as Kenneth McLane
- Phyllis Haver as Sarah Graham
- Freeman Wood as Chester James
- Lillian Elliott as Mrs. Clark
- Mathilde Brundage as Mrs. Graham
- Clarissa Selwynne as Mrs. James
- Vondell Darr as Mary
- Edward Coxen as Club Secretary

== Preservation and status ==
A complete copy of the film is located at the Cinematheque Royale de Belgique.

== Bibliography ==
- Bernard F. Dick. Columbia Pictures: Portrait of a Studio. University Press of Kentucky, 2015. ISBN 978-0-8131-3019-4
