= Harriet Ford (actress) =

American dramatist (1863–1949)

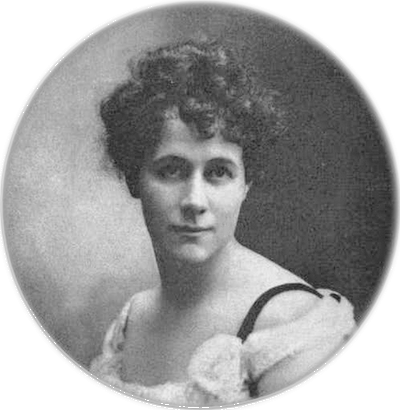
- Born: Harriet French Ford; 1863; Seymour, Connecticut, U.S.
- Died: December 12, 1949 (aged 85–86); New York City, New York, U.S.
- Occupations: actress, playwright
- Spouse: Forde Morgan (m. 1930)
- Writing career
- Language: English
- Notable work: "Back from the Dead"

Harriet Ford (after marriage, Morgan; 1863 – December 12, 1949) was an American actress and playwright. She began writing during her first year as a theater actress. After she stopped acting, her writing continued, which included monologues and plays, some with co-authors. Her contemporaries included: Edith Ellis, Marion Fairfax, Eleanor Gates, Georgia Douglas Johnson, Margaret Mayo, Marguerite Merington, Martha Morton, Lottie Blair Parker, Josephine Preston Peabody, Mary Roberts Rinehart, Madeleine Lucette Ryley, and Rida Johnson Young.

== Early life and education ==
Harriet French Ford was born in Seymour, Connecticut, in 1868 or 1863, the daughter of Samuel and Isabel Stoddard Ford. She was educated in the public schools of New Haven, Connecticut and Boston, Massachusetts, before she became a pupil at the Boston School of Oratory. After graduating from that institution, where her talent for recitation and acting was thought remarkable, she entered the American Academy of Dramatic Arts in New York City, graduating in two years. She also attended the Sargent Dramatic School, studying under David Belasco who prophesied for her success as an interpreter of the plays of others.

== Career ==
Ford started her career as an actress. After six years of varied work, beginning with the chorus of She, from which Charles Frohman rescued her at rehearsal by assigning her a part in the same play, and ending with three years as a leading actress for Sol Smith Russell, convinced of her interest in the stage.

She began to write during her first year acting on the stage, while she was appearing in William Gillette's plays in London. He was her stage sponsor. Henry Morton Stanley was returning from Africa with Emin Pasha. A prize had been offered for the best poem celebrating his return, the poem to be printed on silk and read at the banquet tendered to the returning hero. Ford, having just completed her first season on the stage, won the prize from English competitors. The poem was titled, "Back from the Dead".

Ford wrote The Argyle Case and The Fourth Estate with Harvey Jerrold O'Higgins and Joseph Medill Patterson. They stated that Ford's amiability was proof that collaboration with her would inevitably end in mutual admiration. Ford stated that instead of the collaboration being a trial to the spirit, it was an absolute gain in the matter of time. “With two persons working the play is done in half the time,” she said. In fact, she and Joseph Medill Patterson wrote The Fourth Estate in nine days. Co-authoring The Argyle Case, and The Dummy determined her career as a writer. While on tour, she wrote monologues for the variety stage for six years. She finally stopped acting and took to writing. She called on Sarah Cowell LeMoyne, then a popular reader, and asked permission to write a monologue for her. When the monologue was completed, LeMoyne's need of it had passed, but she arranged for its sale, and Ford began writing a play for her with Beatrice deMille. It was that play, The Greatest Thing in the World, in which LeMoyne came into notability. It was her fortune to write plays for those in the early careers. Kyrle Bellew, returned after 12 years absence from the United States, came to play to a new generation and to make a new public for himself in A Gentleman from France. It was in Ford's Audrey that Eleanor Robson began her best work.

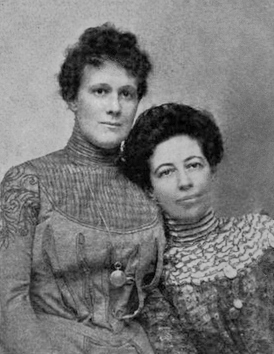
Harriet Ford and Beatrice deMille, from a 1900 publication.

Ford wrote her first monologue for the reader Evelyne Hilliard. It was met with such success that immediately a second and third were written. They were recited by Hilliard at both public and private readings in London drawing rooms, and also in the White House. So many requests were made for the different episodes that Ford was encouraged to collect them under one cover. "Me an' Methuselar and Other Episodes " was the result. It contained ten episodes which ranged from dramatic to pathetic, from witty to amusing. Each episode was a complete story treated with human interest and character delineation.

Ford was the author of several plays. The first was The Greatest Thing in the World, co-authored with Matilda Beatrice deMille. There followed A Gentleman of France, the “last of the swashbucklers,” as the author irreverently classified it, and described its "slaughter of eighteen”; the dramatization of Audrey, The Fourth Estate, The Little Brother of the Rich, The Argyle Case, and The Dummy. They ran the gamut from the psychological problem play to the then-modern detection of crime drama, including the romantic and business plays and the play of politics.

== Personal life ==
She married Dr. Forde Morgan (1865–1938) in 1930; he was a medical director of Sterling Products Company.

Harriet Ford Morgan died December 12, 1949, in New York City. Her papers are held at the New York Public Library.

== Selected works ==
- A Gentleman of France; A Drama, 1902 (with Stanley John Weyman)
- A Lady in Love, 1920 (with Caroline Duer)
- Are Men Superior?: A Farce-comedy in One Act, 1932
- The Argyle Case, A Play in Four Acts, 1912 (with Harvey J O'Higgins)
- Audrey, 1903 (with Ernest F. Bodington, Eugene Wiley Presbrey, Henry Hadley, Mary Johnston)
- The Bride. A Comedy in One Act, 1924
- The Divine Afflatus, A Comedy in One Act, 1931
- The Greatest Thing in the World: A Play in Four Acts, 1899 (with Matilda Beatrice deMille)
- The Happy Hoboes, A Comedy in One Act, 1928 (with Althea Sprague Tucker)
- Heroic Treatment. A Comedy in One Act., 1933
- "The Honour of the Humble": A Drama Adapted from the French of Pierre Newsky, 1902 (with Pierre Newsky)
- In-laws, 1928
- The Island Impossible, 1899 (illustrated by Katharine Pyle)
- Jacqueline. A Play, 1909 (with Caroline King Duer)
- Kidnapped, 1913 (with Harvey J. O'Higgins)
- Me an' Methuselar, and Other Episodes, 1895
- Mr. Susan Peters, A Comedy in One Act, 1928
- Mysterious Money, A Comedy in Three Acts, 1929
- Wanted-Money. A Comedy in One Act., 1928 (with Althea Sprague Tucker)
- What Are Parents For? A Play in One Act., 1930
- What Imagination Will Do. A Comedy in One Act., 1928
- Where Julia Rules; A Comedy in Four Acts, 1923 (with Caroline Duer)
- The Wrong Number, 1921, (with Harvey J O'Higgins)
- Youth Must Be Served: A Comedy in One Act, 1926
