= Cuelei River =

River in Angola

The Cuelei River (Kwelei) is a river in central Angola of southwestern Africa. For part of its length, it forms the border between Bié Province to the north and Cubango Province to the south. Its major tributary the Cuceque, and its tributary the Missango, also form part of that boundary.

The Cuelei arises at 13°46′51″S 17°51′35″E in the Anhara-do-Cuelei (Cuelei Salt pan), at an elevation of 1,520 metres (4,990 ft). It flows basically south for its entire length. The Cuelei flows into the Cuchi which flows into the Cubango.
