= John William De Forest =

American soldier and writer (1826–1906)

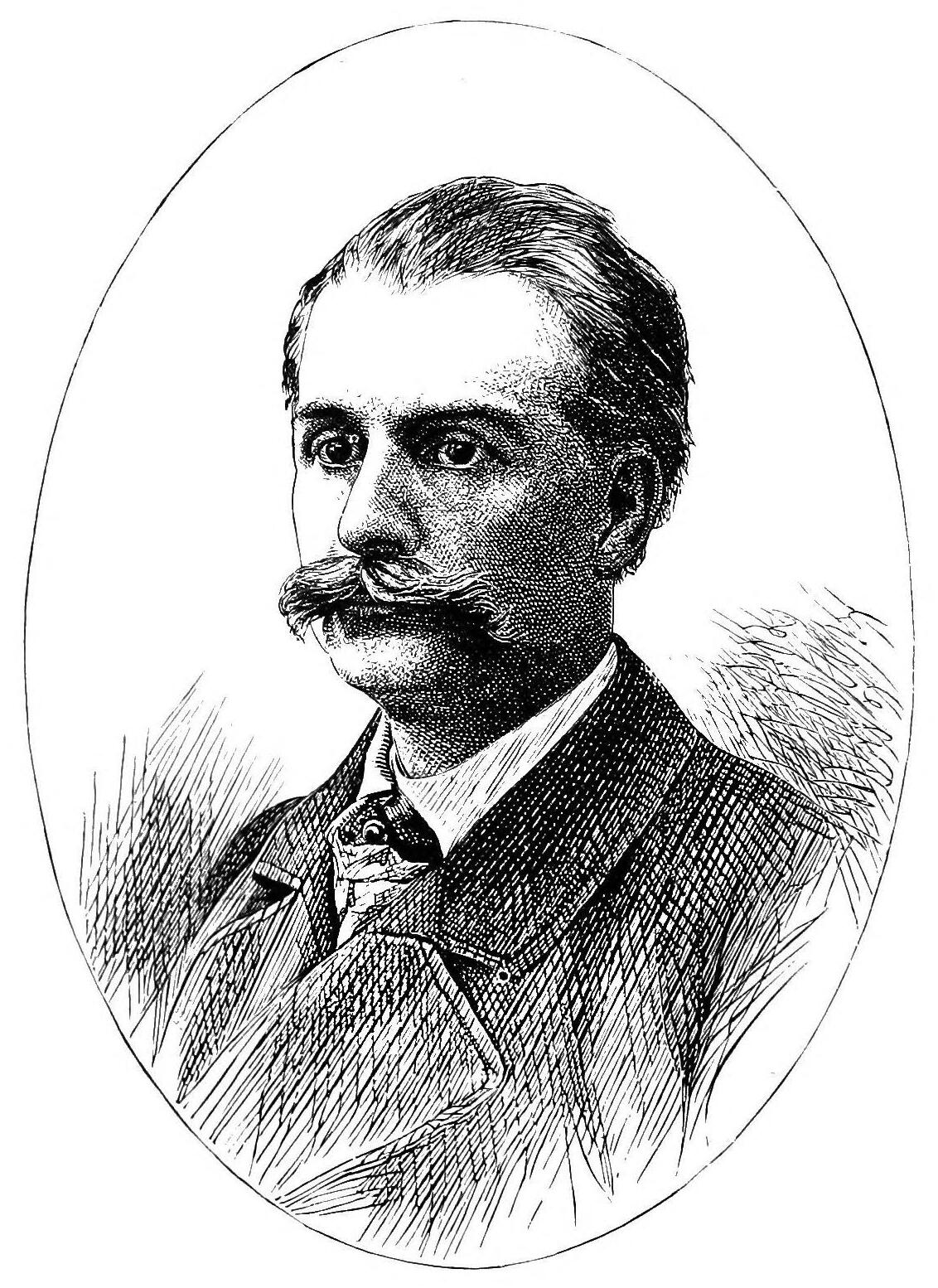
- Born: May 31, 1826; Seymour, Connecticut, US
- Died: July 17, 1906 (aged 80); New Haven, Connecticut, US
- Occupation: Writer
- Writing career
- Genre: Realistic fiction
- Subject: American Civil War
- Notable work: Miss Ravenel's Conversion from Secession to Loyalty
- Military career
- Allegiance: (United States) United States; Union
- Branch: United States Army; Union Army
- Rank: Captain; Brevet Major
- Unit: 12th Connecticut Volunteers
- Conflicts: American Civil War

John William De Forest (May 31, 1826 – July 17, 1906) was an American soldier and writer of literary realism, best known for his Civil War novel Miss Ravenel's Conversion from Secession to Loyalty. He also coined the term for the Great American Novel, one which would embody the country in one text.

== Biography ==
=== Early life and career ===
De Forest was born in Seymour, Connecticut, (then called Humphreysville), the son of a prosperous cotton manufacturer. He did not attend college, but instead pursued independent studies, mainly abroad, where he was a student in Latin, and became a fluent speaker of French, Italian, and Spanish. While yet a youth, he spent four years traveling in Europe, and two years in the Levant, residing chiefly in Syria. In 1850, he again visited Europe, making extensive tours through Great Britain, France, Italy, Germany, Greece, and Asia Minor. From that time, he wrote short stories for periodicals, having already authored several books.

One of his earliest works, The History of the Indians of Connecticut, from the Earliest known Period to 1850, shows his interest in history. Written from 1847 to 1850, The History of the Indians of Connecticut is critical of the settlers' treatment of the Pequots and of King Philip's War, which is somewhat surprising given the early date of the scholarship. The non-fictional work also foreshadows De Forest's later fiction in its subject, realism, and occasional violence.

In 1856, De Forest married Harriet Stillman Shepherd and the couple spent the early years of their marriage in Charleston, South Carolina. Their only child, Louis Shepherd De Forest, was born there in 1857.

De Forest serialized his first novel, Witching Times, in Putnam's Monthly Magazine in 1856 and 1857.

He received the honorary degree of A. M. from Amherst College in 1859.

=== Civil War ===
With the advent of the American Civil War, De Forest returned to the United States. As a captain in the Union Army, he organized a company from New Haven, the 12th Connecticut Volunteers. He served constantly in the field until January 1865, taking an active part under Maj. Gen. Godfrey Weitzel's command in the southwestern states, and under Philip Sheridan in the Shenandoah Valley.

Graphic descriptions of battle scenes in Louisiana, and of Sheridan's battles in the valley of the Shenandoah, were published in Harper's Monthly during the war by Major De Forest, who was present on all the occasions thus mentioned, and though experiencing forty-six days under fire, received but one trifling wound.

De Forest mustered out from the volunteer army in 1865 with the brevet rank of major.

=== Postbellum ===
After being mustered out of the army with the rest of the Veteran Reserve Corps of which he was the adjutant general, De Forest transferred to the Bureau of Refugees, Freedmen and Abandoned Lands (more commonly known as the "Freedmen's Bureau") and was appointed Assistant Commissioner in charge of the post in Greenville, South Carolina. His experiences there, published in magazines of the period and eventually in collected form as A Union Officer in the Reconstruction shed light on the conditions in the South during the Reconstruction.

His magazine articles of his time in the army were also collected published posthumously as A Volunteer's Adventures.

In 1867, De Forest published his most significant novel, Miss Ravenel's Conversion from Secession to Loyalty. William Dean Howells praised him as a "realist before realism was named," but most early critics argued that the Romantic elements of De Forest's plot mixed poorly with the admirable realism of the battle scenes, and the novel fell through with the audience in 1867. Reeditions in 1939 and 1956 reintroduced De Forest as an author, but the full range of his experimentalism in this early novel has still not been fully understood. In Miss Ravenel's Conversion, De Forest tried to come to grips with writing experiences he himself had had, and which did not fit any of the idealist and romantic patterns that war literature had followed so far. Consequently, there are a number of scenes that portray war with a graphic sense of bloody reality (e.g. the siege of Port Hudson), but there are also burlesque and comical passages, as well as reflective moments.

In 1868, De Forest called for a new type of literature in an essay for The Nation and coined the term "The Great American Novel", which became his most influential contribution to American writing. He demanded accurate "tableaux" of the country and noted that the closest to meeting the goal was Uncle Tom's Cabin by Harriet Beecher Stowe. As he described the novel, "It was a picture of American life, drawn with a few strong and passionate strokes, not filled in thoroughly, but still a portrait."

He died of heart disease in New Haven, Connecticut, on July 17, 1906.

== Writing ==
De Forest wrote essays, a few poems, and about fifty short stories, numerous military sketches, and book reviews, most of which were anonymous. His published books include:

- The History of the Indians of Connecticut, from the Earliest known Period to 1850 (Hartford, 1851)
- Oriental Acquaintance, a sketch of travels in Asia Minor (New York, 1856)
- Witching Times (1856)
- European Acquaintance (1858)
- Seacliff, or The Mystery of the Westervelts (Boston, 1859)
- Miss Ravenel's Conversion from Secession to Loyalty (New York, 1867)
- Overland (New York, 1871)
- Kate Beaumont (Boston, 1872)
- The Wetherell Affair (New York, 1873)
- Honest John Vane (New Haven, 1875)
- Justine Vane (New York, 1875)
- Playing the Mischief (1875)
- Irene Vane (1877)
- Irene, the Missionary (Boston, 1879)
- The Oddest of Courtships, or the Bloody Chasm (New York, 1881)
- A Lover's Revolt (1898) (set in the American Revolution)
- The De Forests of Avesnes (and of New Netherland) a Huguenot thread in American colonial history (New Haven, 1900)
- The Downing legends; stories in rhyme (New Haven, 1901)
- Poems; Medley and Palestina (New Haven, 1902)
- A Union Officer in the Reconstruction (1948)
