= SS Dumbo =

Scottish coastal trading vessel

History
- Name: Empire Chelsea (1944-47); Humbergate (1947–55); Springwear (1955–59); Lynnwear (1959–62); Dumbo (1962–70)
- Owner: Ministry of War Transport (1944–45); Ministry of Transport (1945–47); Hull Gates Shipping Co Ltd (1947–55); Efford Shipping Co Ltd (1955–59); Lynn Shipping Co Ltd (1959–62); South Star Corporation (1962–69); Las Palmas Port Authority (1969–70)
- Operator: Onesimus Dorey & Sons (1944–47); Craggs & Jenkins Ltd (1947–55); Springwell Shipping Co Ltd (1955–59); Lynn Shipping Co Ltd (1959–62); V & J A Ensenat (1962–68)
- Port of registry: (United Kingdom) Aberdeen (1945–47); United Kingdom (1947–55); Panama City (1955–70)
- Builder: John Lewis & Sons
- Launched: 18 December 1944
- Completed: February 1945
- Out of service: 1968-70
- Identification: Code Letters GDTQ (1945–55); United Kingdom Official Number 180987 (1944–55)
- Fate: Scrapped

General characteristics
- Tonnage: 1,051 GRT; 586 NRT
- Length: 205 ft 0 in (62.48 m)
- Beam: 32 ft 8 in (9.96 m)
- Depth: 13 ft 7 in (4.14 m)
- Installed power: Triple expansion steam engine
- Propulsion: Screw propeller

Dumbo was a 1,051 GRT coaster that was built in 1944 by John Lewis & Sons Ltd, Aberdeen as Empire Chelsea. She was built for the Ministry of War Transport (MoWT). In 1947 she was sold and renamed Humbergate. Another sale in 1955 saw her renamed Springwear. In 1959, she was sold and renamed Lynnwear. In 1962 she was sold to Panama and renamed Dumbo. In 1968 she was arrested in Spain and sold by Court Order. She then ran aground and the sale was cancelled after the ship was declared a constructive total loss. Another sale resulted in plans to turn her into a floating nightclub, but these failed to come to fruition and she was scrapped c1970.

== Description ==
The ship was built by John Lewis & Sons Ltd, Aberdeen. She was launched on 18 December 1944 and completed in February 1945.

The ship was 205 feet 0 inches (62.48 m) long, with a beam of 32 feet 8 inches (9.96 m) and a depth of 13 feet 7 inches (4.14 m). She had a GRT of 1,051and a NRT of 586.

The ship was propelled by a triple expansion steam engine that had cylinders of 14 inches (36 cm) inches (57 cm), 24 inches (61 cm) and 40 inches (100 cm) diameter by 27 inches (69 cm) stroke.

== History ==
Empire Chelsea was built for the MoWT She was placed under the management of Onesimus Dorey & Sons Ltd, Guernsey. The Code Letters GDTQ and United Kingdom Official Number 180987 were allocated. Her port of registry was Aberdeen.

In 1947, Empire Chelsea was sold to the Hull Gates Shipping Co Ltd, Hull and was renamed Humbergate. She was operated under the management of Craggs & Jenkins Ltd. In 1955, Humbergate was sold to Efford Shipping Co Ltd and was renamed Springwear She was operated under the management of Springwell Shipping Co Ltd, London. A further sale in 1959 to the Lynn Shipping Co Ltd, London saw her renamed Lynnwear.

In 1962, Lynnwear was sold to the South Star Corporation, Panama and renamed Dumbo. She was placed under the management of V & J A Ensenat, Spain. In October 1968, Dumbo was placed under arrest at Las Palmas. She was later sold at auction by Court Order. The winning bidder was Naviera del Odiel, SA. However, on 24 November 1968 she was driven ashore at Las Palmas. The ship was declared a constructive total loss and the offer for purchase of the ship was withdrawn by Naviera de Odiel. Ownership of the ship was assumed by the Port Authority at Las Palmas. Dumbo was refloated in May 1969 and beached. She was sold by auction on 10 December 1969. Her new owner intended to convert her to a floating nightclub but the plans were abandoned. The ship was eventually sold to Don Martin Juantey Malvarez and scrapped c1970.
