= Lac Dummy =

- Location within Quebec
- Location: Outaouais, Quebec, Canada
- Coordinates: 46°03′13″N 75°23′57″W
- Type: lake

Lac Dummy is a lake in Outaouais, Quebec, Canada.
