= The Dummy (1917 film) =

- Directed by: Francis J. Grandon
- Screenplay by: Harriet Ford; Harvey J. O'Higgins; Eve Unsell
- Produced by: Daniel Frohman
- Starring: Jack Pickford; Frank Losee; Edwin Stanley; Helen Greene; Ethelmary Oakland; Ruby Hoffman
- Cinematography: Larry Williams
- Production company: Famous Players Film Company
- Distributed by: Paramount Pictures
- Release date: March 19, 1917
- Running time: 50 minutes
- Country: United States
- Language: English

The Dummy is a 1917 American drama silent film directed by Francis J. Grandon and written by Harriet Ford, Harvey J. O'Higgins and Eve Unsell. The film stars Jack Pickford, Frank Losee, Edwin Stanley, Helen Greene, Ethelmary Oakland and Ruby Hoffman. The film was released on March 19, 1917, by Paramount Pictures.

== Plot ==
The Merediths, in reality much in love, have quarrelled and agreed to separate but cannot agree as to the disposition of their little daughter Beryl. All this is opportune for the plans of Spider, a notorious kidnapper and his gang, who plot to steal Beryl while her nurse flirts in the park with one of their pals. The scheme works out as they plan and the child is taken to a deserted gambling den.

The father and mother, in desperation, each apply to Babbings, a celebrated detective, although each accuses the other of haying kidnapped the child. Detective Babbings privately suspects Spider's gang, whom he knows to be in town, but intends to make sure, so he has Spider shadowed. His men discover that Spider is receiving telegrams in code. It is necessary to get this code, so Babbings and one of his trusted men go to the hotel where Spider is stopping. Here they are at a loss until Barney Cook, one-time messenger boy, comes whistling into their office to apply for a position with "regular detectives," and carries Babbings' bag to the hotel. Babbings has noticed the boy's shrewdness and asks him what he can do. Barney replies that he can "hold his tongue and talk deaf and dumb." This appears to please Babbings, who hires the boy at once and starts him to work by telling him to get the code book from Spider's room. The lad, disguised as a bellhop, accomplishes this.

Detective Babbings tells him the real plan, which is for Barney to masquerade as a wealthy deaf and dumb boy going to a sanatorium with an attendant. Spider will undoubtedly think this is a nice morsel for himself and will take Barney to the spot where he is hiding little Beryl, thinking to receive still another big ransom. This happens as Babbings has foreseen, and Barney finds himself in the deserted house with little Beryl and Spider's gang. He manages to phone his information to Babbings in the night and the latter comes to the house disguised as a member of the gang. He gives the password and all would have been well had not Mrs. Meredith, summoned by the gang for the purpose of wringing money from her, entered and exclaimed his name, warning the crooks. They succeeded in making a getaway, but take Beryl and Barney with them.

Barney is nearly discovered in his efforts to speak to Babbings but manages to disarm their suspicions and later signals to a small town sheriff whom he sees reading the notice of the thousand dollar reward offered by the Merediths. The sheriff, however, objects to sharing the reward with Barney and locks him and Beryl in a room while he goes to town to get it. Barney escapes, however, and an automobile race to town follows in which Barney is the victor by a few seconds. Barney not only aids in finding the lost child, but practically does the whole job of restoration to the grieved parents.

== Cast ==
- Jack Pickford as Barney Cook
- Frank Losee as Detective Babbings
- Edwin Stanley as Mr. Meredith
- Helen Greene as Mrs. Meredith
- Ethelmary Oakland as Beryl Meredith
- Ruby Hoffman as Rosie Hart
- Hal Wilson
