= Little Dummy Lake =

- Location within Wisconsin
- Location: Barron County, Wisconsin
- Coordinates: 45.5784628°N 91.9881927°W
- Type: lake

Little Dummy Lake is a lake in Barron County, Wisconsin, in the United States.

A boat landing offers recreational boaters access to the 43-acre (17 ha) lake. Little Dummy Lake is a 43-acre lake located in Barron County. It has a maximum depth of 44 feet. Visitors have access to the lake from a public boat landing. Fish include Panfish, Largemouth Bass and Northern Pike.

== See also ==
- List of lakes in Wisconsin
