= Harvey J. O'Higgins =

American dramatist (1876–1929)

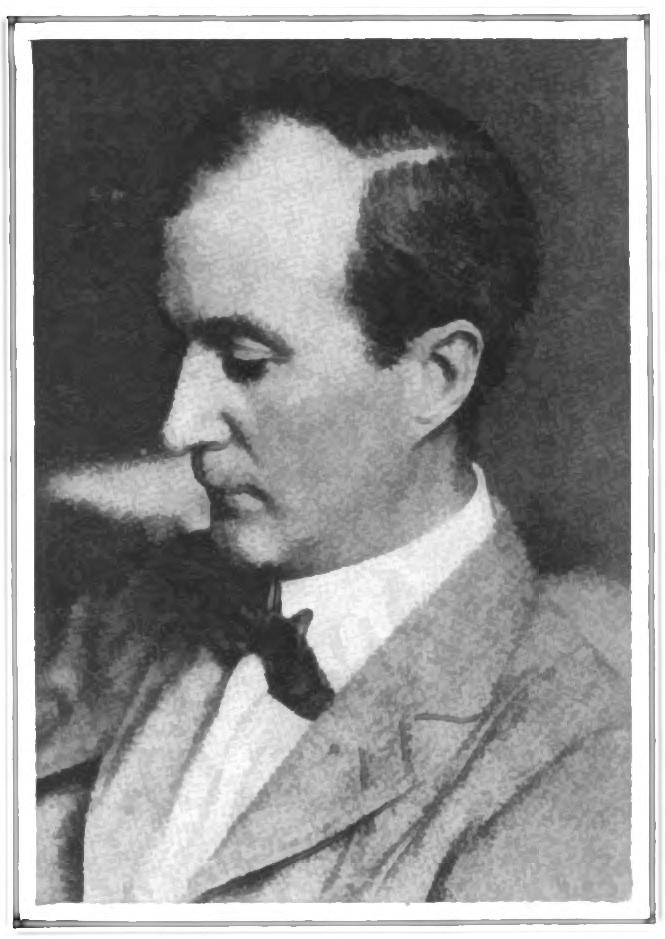
A photograph of American-Canadian author Harvey O'Higgins, from the Outlook Magazine, Nov. 1922

Harvey Jerrold O'Higgins (November 14, 1876 – February 28, 1929) was a Canadian-born novelist and journalist.

== Biography ==
He was born in London, Ontario, in 1876. He studied in the University of Toronto from 1893 to 1897 but did not graduate. He worked as a journalist in Toronto but soon moved to the United States when his detective stories became popular in American magazines. He also wrote for political and sociological journals. He then began writing longer works of fiction, and then works on social questions with various specialists as collaborators: Ben B. Lindsey (The Beast and The Doughboy's Religion), Harriet Ford (On the Hiring Line), Frank J. Cannon (Under the Prophet in Utah), Edward H. Reade (psychoanalysis of prominent figures). He was led to psychoanalysis by personal illness, and utilized it in some literary efforts. He then moved on to do some literary works centered on women. He developed several plays, sometimes in collaboration with others.

He and Anna G. Williams were married in 1901. He died in Martinsville, New Jersey in 1929.

== Works ==
- The Smoke Eaters: a story of love and youth; the story of a fire crew (1905)
- Don-A-Dreams (1906)
- A Grand Army Man (1908)
- Old Clinkers, a story of the New York Fire Department (1909)
- The Beast (1910; with Judge Ben B. Lindsey)
- Under the Prophet (1911, with F.J. Cannon
- The Dummy (1913)
- The Adventures of Detective Barney (1915) (collection)
- Mr. Lazarus (1916)
- From the Life (1919)
- The Secret Springs (1920)
- The Doughboys Religion (1920, with Judge Ben B. Lindsey)
- Some Distinguished Americans (1922)
- Julie Cane (1924)
- The American Mind in Action (1924, with E.H. Reade)
- Clara Baron (1926)
- Detective Duff Unravels It (1929, posthumous collection)

=== Plays, with Harriet Ford ===
- On the Hiring Line (1909)
- The Argyle Case (1912; adapted for film, 1917, 1929)
- The Dummy (1913; adapted for film, 1917, 1929)
- Polygamy (1914)
- Main Street (1921)
- The Wrong Number (1921)
