= Miss Ravenel's Conversion from Secession to Loyalty =

1867 novel by John William De Forest

- Author: John William De Forest
- Language: English
- Publication date: 1867

Miss Ravenel's Conversion from Secession to Loyalty is an 1867 American Civil War novel by veteran John William De Forest.

== Overview ==
As a captain of the Twelfth Connecticut Volunteers, De Forest had seen action in the Civil War in Louisiana in 1862 and in the Shenendoah Valley campaign in 1864 before being discharged for health problems. He published Miss Ravenel's Conversion from Secession to Loyalty in 1867 as a critique of slaveholding Southern society.

In contrast to much of the Civil War fiction that had gone before it, Miss Ravenel's Conversion portrayed war not in the chivalric, idealized manner of Walter Scott, but as a bloody and inglorious hell. Though William Dean Howells praised DeForest as a "realist before realism was named", most critics have argued that the Romantic elements of his plot mix poorly with the otherwise admirable realism of the battle scenes. The novel is often cited as a possible influence on Stephen Crane's The Red Badge of Courage, though the evidence that Crane had read the novel remains inconclusive.
