= Dumb =

Dumb may refer to:

== A human state ==
- Muteness, the condition of being unwilling or unable to speak
- Stupidity, a lack of intelligence

== Albums ==
- Dumb (album), by Flume and Emma Louise, 2025

== Songs ==
- "Dumb" (The 411 song), 2004
- "Dumb" (Faith Evans song), 2012
- "Dumb" (Nirvana song), 1993
- "Dumb" (Tich song), 2013
- "Dumb", by the Beautiful South from Quench, 1998
- "Dumb", by Bvndit, 2019
- "Dumb", by Garbage from Version 2.0, 1998
- "Dumb", by Jason Derulo from Future History, 2011
- "Dumb", by Jazmine Sullivan from Reality Show, 2015
- "Dumb", by Kelly Rowland, 2015
- "Dumb", by Noga Erez from The Vandalist, 2024
- "Dumb", by Royce da 5'9" from Book of Ryan, 2018
- "Dumb", by Silver Sun from Silver Sun, 1997
- "Dumb", by Stand Atlantic from F.E.A.R., 2022
- "Dumb", by Todrick Hall from Straight Outta Oz, 2016
- "Dumb", by Zerobaseone from Never Say Never, 2025

== Other uses ==
- Dumb: The Story of Big Brother Magazine, a 2017 American documentary film

== See also ==
- Deaf and dumb
- Dumbing down, the term referring to oversimplification of a topic
- Dummer (disambiguation)
- Dummy (disambiguation)
