= The Heart of Youth =

1919 film by Robert G. Vignola

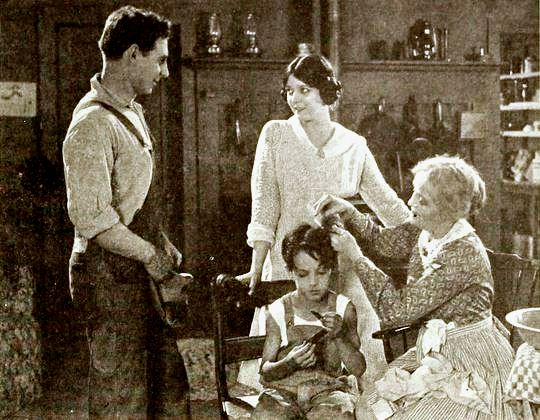
- Film still
- Directed by: Robert G. Vignola
- Screenplay by: Beulah Marie Dix
- Produced by: Jesse L. Lasky
- Starring: Lila Lee; Tom Forman; Buster Irving; Charles Ogle; Fanny Midgley; Guy Oliver; Lydia Knott
- Cinematography: Henry Kotani
- Production company: Famous Players–Lasky Corporation
- Distributed by: Paramount Pictures
- Release date: August 24, 1919
- Running time: 50 minutes
- Country: United States
- Language: Silent (English intertitles)

The Heart of Youth is a lost 1919 American silent comedy film directed by Robert G. Vignola and written by Beulah Marie Dix. The film stars Lila Lee, Tom Forman, Buster Irving, Charles Ogle, Fanny Midgley, Guy Oliver, and Lydia Knott. The film was released on August 24, 1919, by Paramount Pictures.

== Plot ==
As described in a film magazine, Calvin Prendergast and Os Whipple, small town neighbors, quarrel over a strip of land on which there is a spring to which both claim ownership. Josephine Darchat, granddaughter of Calvin, and Russ Prendergast, son of Os, are much attracted to each other although the old men object. Calvin and Os leave town to seek legal advice regarding the spring. During their absence the youngster's romance progresses, rousing the jealousy of a young woman guest of the Prendergasts. She causes a misunderstanding between Jo and Russ by changing a love note of Russ' until it is almost an insult. Calvin and Os arrive back in town, and each man's anger is aroused by reports of activities of the other's family. Calvin decides to take the spring by force and summons a gang of rowdies to his aid. Os likewise calls out a gang. During the skirmish that takes place, one of the Prendergast children fall into the creek. Jo rescues him, and Russ assists Jo from drowning. The discord between the families is smoothed out.

== Cast ==
- Lila Lee as Josephine Darchat
- Tom Forman as Russ Prendergast
- Buster Irving as Jimmy
- Charles Stanton Ogle as Os Whipple
- Fanny Midgley as Mitty Whipple
- Guy Oliver as Calvin Prendergast
- Lydia Knott as Mrs. Prendergast
- Fay Lemport as Mildred
- Gertrude Short as Cora
- Cameron Coffey as Dickey
- Vera Sisson as Evie Atherton
- Lewis Sargent as Lorenzo
- Sylvia Ashton as The Cook
- Robert Brower as The Squire
- Edward Alexander as Abner
