= The Reckless Buckaroo =

- Theatrical release poster
- Directed by: Harry L. Fraser
- Screenplay by: Zarah Tazil
- Produced by: Ray Kirkwood
- Starring: Bill Cody; Bill Cody Jr. Betty Mack; Buzz Barton; Roger Williams; Ed Cassidy
- Cinematography: James Diamond
- Edited by: Holbrook N. Todd
- Production company: Ray Kirkwood Productions
- Distributed by: Crescent Pictures Corporation
- Release date: April 2, 1935
- Running time: 57 minutes
- Country: United States
- Language: English

The Reckless Buckaroo is a 1935 American Western film directed by Harry L. Fraser and written by Zarah Tazil. The film stars Bill Cody, Bill Cody Jr., Betty Mack, Buzz Barton, Roger Williams and Ed Cassidy. The film was released on April 2, 1935, by Crescent Pictures Corporation.

== Cast ==
- Bill Cody as Bill Carter
- Bill Cody Jr. as Ted Simms
- Betty Mack as Diane Madden
- Buzz Barton as Drake
- Roger Williams as Hal Bost
- Ed Cassidy as Sheriff Madden
- Lew Meehan as Lord
- Milburn Morante as Desert Lew
- Budd Buster as Pete
