= Gordon Griffith =

American actor

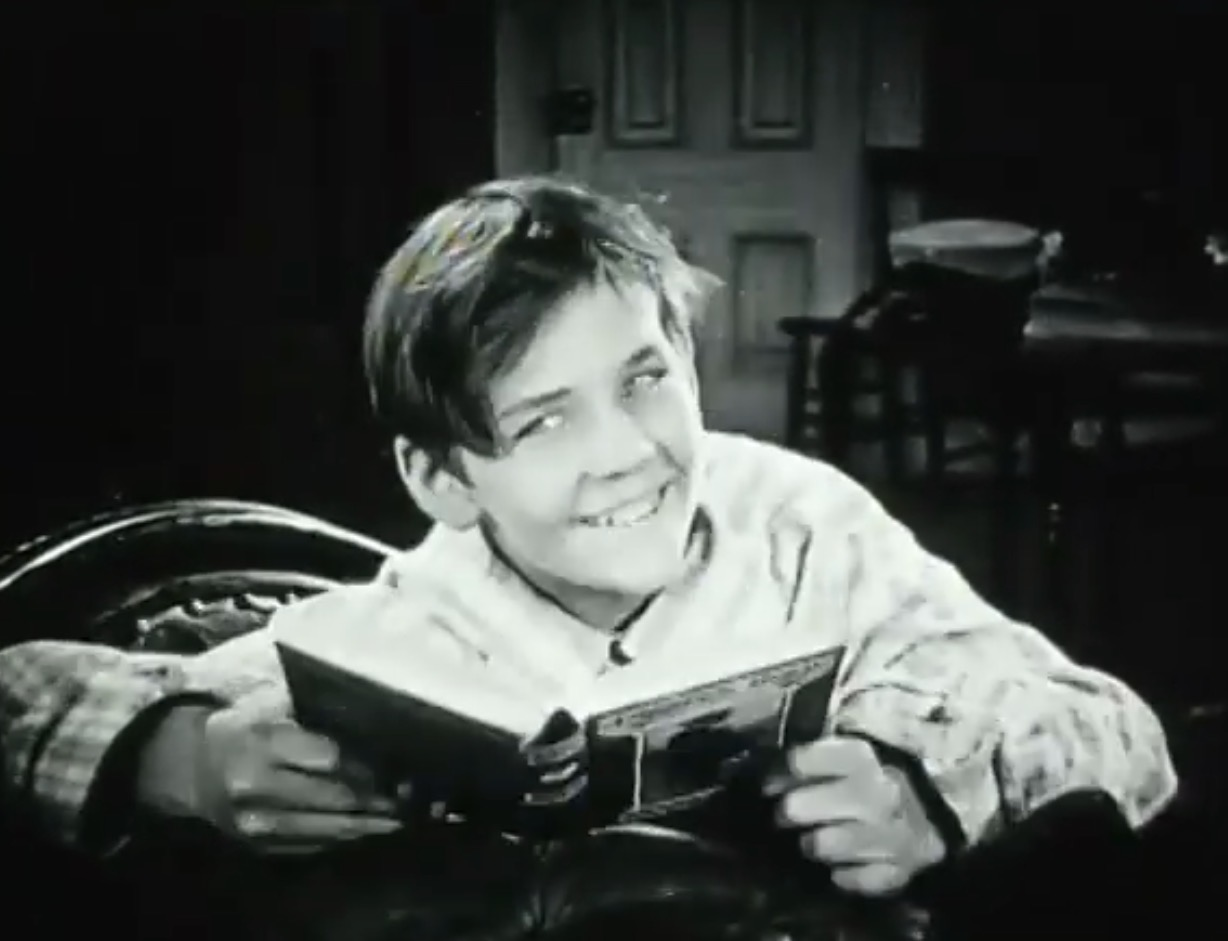
- Griffith as Tom Sawyer in Huckleberry Finn (1920)
- Born: Gordon S. Griffith; July 4, 1907; Chicago, Illinois, U.S.
- Died: October 12, 1958 (aged 51); Los Angeles, California, U.S.
- Occupations: Actor, assistant director, film producer
- Years active: 1913-1936 (as an actor)
- Parent: Katherine Griffith

Gordon S. Griffith (July 4, 1907 – October 12, 1958) was an American assistant director, film producer, and one of the first child actors in the American movie industry. Griffith worked in the film industry for five decades, acting in over 60 films, and surviving the transition from silent films to talkies—films with sound. During his acting career, he worked with Charlie Chaplin, Fatty Arbuckle, Mary Pickford, Mabel Normand, Bessie Love, Betty Bronson, his mother Katherine Griffith, and was the first actor to portray young Tarzan on film.

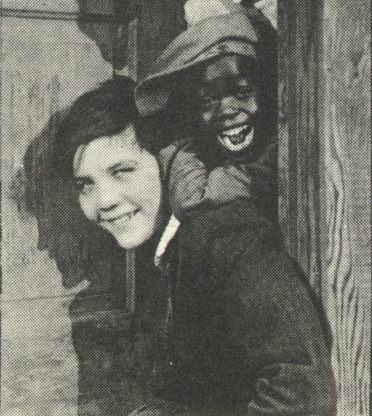
Gordon Griffith (bottom) and Florence Morrison (top) in a detail from a still for Penrod (1922).

== Silent film ==
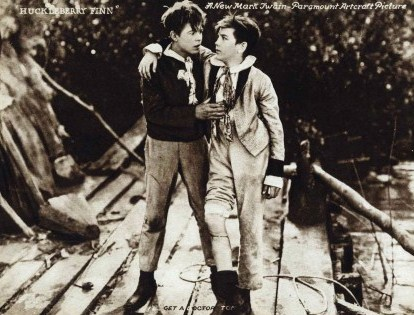
As Tom Sawyer in Huckleberry Finn (1920), with Lewis Sargent as Huck

Griffith was born on July 4, 1907, in Chicago, Illinois, to actors Harry Sutherland Griffith and Katherine Kiernan Griffith. He had two siblings, an older sister Gertrude, and a younger brother Graham—also an actor. Griffith was already an experienced actor when, at age seven, he got his first acting role as a regular character in the Little Billy series of films, starting in 1913. Mack Sennett of Keystone Studios cast Griffith in many of his slapstick features, where he eventually earned supporting roles in Charlie Chaplin films, including Tillie's Punctured Romance, in which he portrayed a paperboy, a role that Milton Berle frequently claimed to have played.

His big break came with the role of young Tarzan, in the 1918 film Tarzan of the Apes. He was required to do his own stunts, such as climbing trees, swinging from vines, and interacting closely with a chimpanzee. Griffith performed much of this role in the nude. Griffith appears before the actor portraying the adult Tarzan—Elmo Lincoln—making him the first actor to portray Tarzan in film. After seeing the movie, a critic described Griffith as "a youthful actor of uncommon gifts."

Griffith received the role of Tom Sawyer in Huckleberry Finn. Later he was again cast in the first Tarzan serial as Tarzan's son, Korak, a role that has been described as "anticipating John Sheffield's 'Boy' roles [in later Tarzan films]." He continued to act in silent films well into his teen years, including a role as Mary Pickford's older brother in Little Annie Rooney (1925).

Both of Griffth's parents died in the 1920s—his mother in 1921 and his father in 1926. At the time of the 1930 census, he and his brother were living with his sister and her family in Pasadena, California.

== Sound era ==
Although his career survived the transition from silent films to sound, Griffith received smaller and smaller roles—occasionally not even being credited for his performances. As his acting career cooled, Griffith moved into other areas of the film industry. At the age of twenty-three he got his first job as an assistant director. His final acting credit came six years later in 1936's Outlaws of the Range. Griffith continued to work in the film industry until his death. Between 1931 and 1940, he worked as an assistant director in over 20 films, including those at Monogram Pictures.

Between 1941 and 1953 he was an associate producer or producer on four films. He was an associate producer under Robert E. Sherwood, and for Gregory Ratoff Productions. In 1941, Griffith became a production manager at Columbia Pictures, and later served as an associate producer for RKO.

In 1958, Griffith died of a heart attack in Hollywood at the age of 51.

== Selected filmography as actor ==
- Cohen's Outing (1913)
- The Riot (1913)
- A Chip Off the Old Block (1913)
- Our Children (1913)
- The Horse Thief (1913)
- A Bath House Beauty (1914)
- Little Billy's Triumph (1914)
- Little Billy's Strategy (1914)
- Little Billy's City Cousin (1914)
- Kid Love (1914)
- How Villains Are Made (1914)
- A Back Yard Theatre (1914)
- The Star Boarder (1914)
- Caught in a Cabaret (1914)
- Tillie's Punctured Romance (1914) as Paperboy (uncredited)
- Kid Auto Races at Venice (1914)
- Little Sunset (1915)
- If My Country Should Call (1916)
- Naked Hearts (1916)
- Two Mothers (1916)
- Tarzan of the Apes (1918)
- The Romance of Tarzan (1918)
- Hitting the High Spots (1918)
- Cupid Forecloses (1919)
- The Son of Tarzan (1920)
- Huckleberry Finn (1920)
- The Kentucky Colonel (1920)
- The Adventures of Tarzan (1921)
- Cameron of the Royal Mounted (1921)
- Penrod (1922)
- More to Be Pitied Than Scorned (1922)
- The Village Blacksmith (1922)
- Main Street (1923)
- The Street of Tears (1924)
- Little Annie Rooney (1925)
- The Cat's Pajamas (1926)
- The Branded Man (1928)
- Forgotten Women (1931)
- Danger Ahead (1935)
- Bars of Hate (1935)
- Gun Play (1935)
- Speed Limited (1935)
- Hot Off the Press (1935)
- Blazing Justice (1936)
- Outlaws of the Range (1936)

== Bibliography ==
- Holmstrom, John. The Moving Picture Boy: An International Encyclopaedia from 1895 to 1995, Norwich, Michael Russell, 1996, pp. 30–32.
