= Jeanne Ellison Shaffer =

American composer and musician

Jeanne Ellison Shaffer (née Butcher; May 25, 1925 – April 9, 2007) was an American composer and musician.

Shaffer was born in Knoxville, Tennessee. She was interested in music from a young age, singing on radio beginning at age four. When she was 11 she began touring with the Paul Whiteman Orchestra. She played the role of Jeanette MacDonald (Mary Robbins) as a child in the 1938 MGM film Girl of the Golden West. Shaffer studied at Samford University, Birmingham–Southern College, and Vanderbilt University.

Shaffer's compositions have been published by 12 companies and in at least three languages. They include three musicals, orchestral pieces, chamber music, a chamber opera, a ballet, organ music, cantatas, and song cycles. Her Three Faces of Woman was recorded in orchestral arrangement by Richard Stoltzman and the Warsaw Philharmonic Orchestra. She has earned grants from the National Endowment for the Humanities, National Endowment for the Arts, and the Aspen Music Festival. She has also served as a choir director, organist, and teacher, and hosted a radio program called Eine Kleine Frauenmusik about female composers.

In 1944, she married Loran O. Shaffer. She married secondly Swiss native Robert S. Barmettler in 1989 while at the Atlantic Center for the Arts with Joan Tower.
