= Screams in the Night =

Screams in the Night may refer to:

- The Awful Dr. Orloff or Screams in the Night, a 1962 film directed by Jesús Franco
- The Unnaturals or Screams in the Night, a 1969 film directed by Antonio Margheriti
- Screams in the Night, the 1987 debut album by Hellion

== See also ==
- A Scream in the Night, a 1934 film directed by Fred C. Newmeyer
