= Cyclone of the Saddle =

1935 film directed by Elmer Clifton

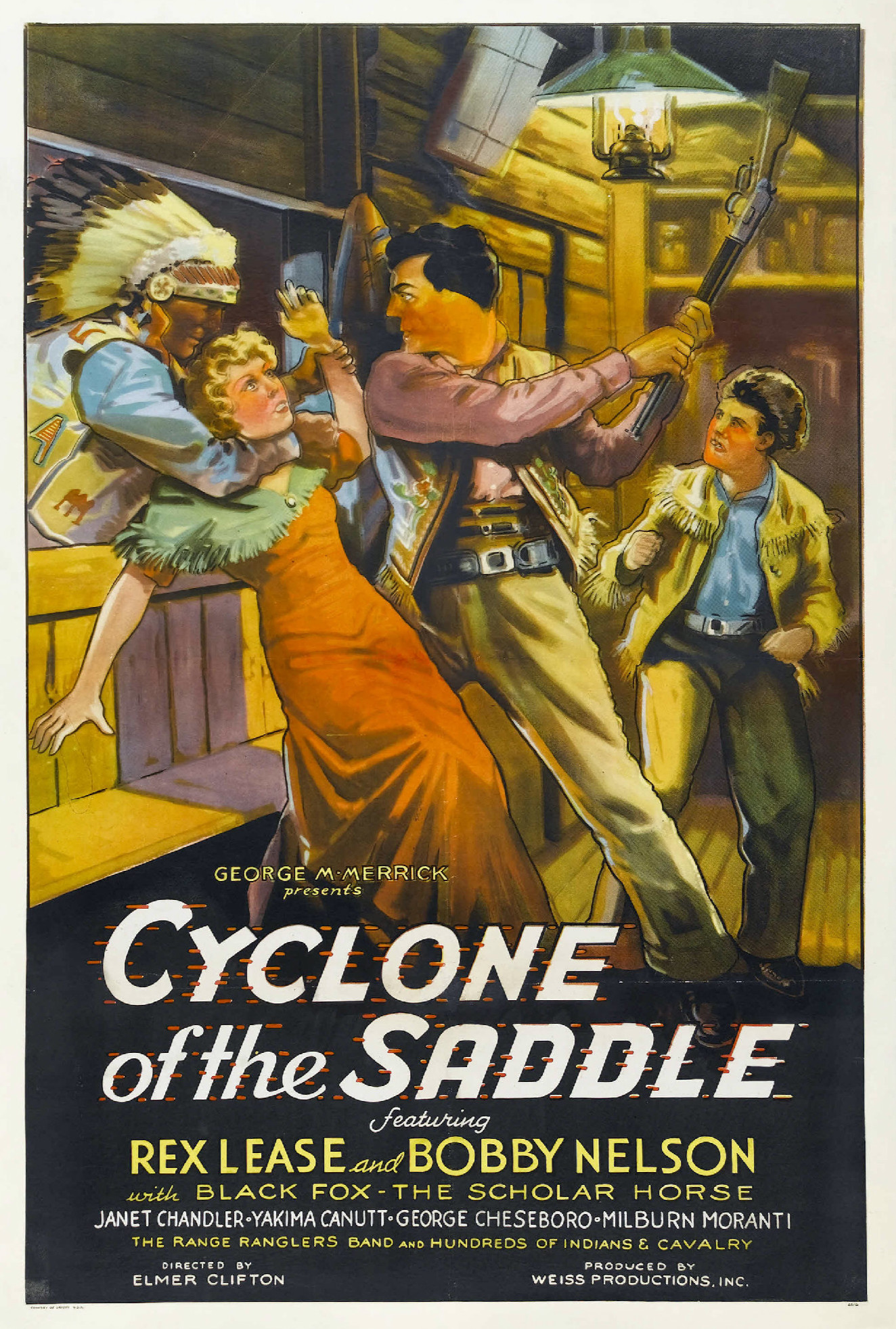
- Theatrical release poster
- Directed by: Elmer Clifton
- Written by: Elmer Clifton; George M. Merrick
- Produced by: George M. Merrick
- Starring: Rex Lease; Janet Chandler; Bobby Nelson; Yakima Canutt
- Cinematography: Eddie Linden
- Production company: Weiss Productions
- Distributed by: State Rights; Superior Talking Pictures
- Release date: December 1935 (US)
- Running time: 55 minutes
- Country: United States
- Language: English

Cyclone of the Saddle is a 1935 American Western film directed by Elmer Clifton, starring Rex Lease, Janet Chandler, Bobby Nelson, and Yakima Canutt.

== Plot ==
Settlers crossing the plains are being terrorized by a group of marauders, some posing as Indians. Andy Thomas, a cavalry soldier, is tasked by his fort's commander to go undercover and in order to stop the outlaws. He meets a wagon train, which includes the Cutters, Ma, Pa, Sue and Dick, who are making their way to their homestead. They are attacked by the marauders, but fend them off, although Pa Cutter is killed during the battle. Two of the outlaws join the wagon train and one of them, Cherokee, harasses Sue, but Andy puts a stop to that. When Cherokee dares him to break a wild pony, Andy does, and afterwards is nicknamed the "Cyclone of the Saddle".

The remaining Cutters make it to their homestead, but Cherokee continues his harassment of Sue. When she is defended by her brother, who wounds Cherokee in the hand, the outlaw kills two braves from the local tribe and frames Dick for their murders. The Indians abduct Dick and his horse, Black Fox, but Black Fox manages to escape and make his way to Andy. Cherokee riles the Indians into attacking the settlers, but Andy and the cavalry arrive in time to put down the uprising, and inform the Indian chief that it was really Cherokee who killed his two men. Cherokee is given to the Indians for justice, and Andy and Sue make plans for the future.

== Cast ==
- Rex Lease as Andy Thomas
- Janet Chandler as Sue
- Bobby Nelson as Dick
- Yakima Canutt as Snake
- Helen Gibson as Ma
- Milburn Morante as Pa
- Charles Davis as High Hawk
- Chief Standing Bear as Porcupine
- Chief Thunder Cloud as Yellow Wolf
- George Chesebro as Cherokee Carter
- Art Mix as Pioneer
- William Desmond as Wagon master

== Reception ==
The Ouachita Citizen gave the film a positive review, calling it "A thrilling story of the old west...", and "...a great picture and one of the most exciting we've ever seen". They felt that the film was full of excitement and action, and paid praise to the stunt work of Yakima Canutt and his "bull-whipping" skills. The Shreveport Journal also gave the film a positive review, calling Rex Lease a "dynamo of action."
