= Trails End (1935 film) =

1935 western film

- Directed by: Albert Herman
- Written by: Jack Jevne
- Based on: Trail's End by James Oliver Curwood
- Produced by: Mitchell Leichter
- Starring: Conway Tearle; Claudia Dell; Fred Kohler
- Cinematography: William H. Tuers
- Edited by: William Austin
- Production company: Black King Productions
- Distributed by: William Steiner
- Release date: August 15, 1935
- Running time: 57 minutes
- Country: United States
- Language: English

Trails End is a 1935 American Western film directed by Albert Herman and starring Conway Tearle, Claudia Dell and Fred Kohler. It is based on a story by James Oliver Curwood. It was given a subsequent release by Astor Pictures following World War II.

== Cast ==
- Conway Tearle as Jim 'Trigger' Malloy
- Claudia Dell as Mrs. Janet Moorehead
- Fred Kohler as Wild Bill Holman
- Charlene Barry as Mary Jane Moorehead
- Ernie Adams as Lefty
- Victor Potel as Red
- Tom London as Randall's Henchman
- Steve Pendleton as Kid Malloy
- Stanley Blystone as Randall, Foreman of the Bar X
- Pat Harmon as Gimpy
- Jack Duffy as Deke
- James Sheridan as Henchman
- Hank Bell as Cowhand
- Herman Hack as Bar-X Cowhand
- Si Jenks as Crusty Old Timer
- Dick Rush as Henchman

== Bibliography ==
- Pitts, Michael R. Western Movies: A Guide to 5,105 Feature Films. McFarland, 2012.
