= Katherine Griffith =

American actress (1876–1921)

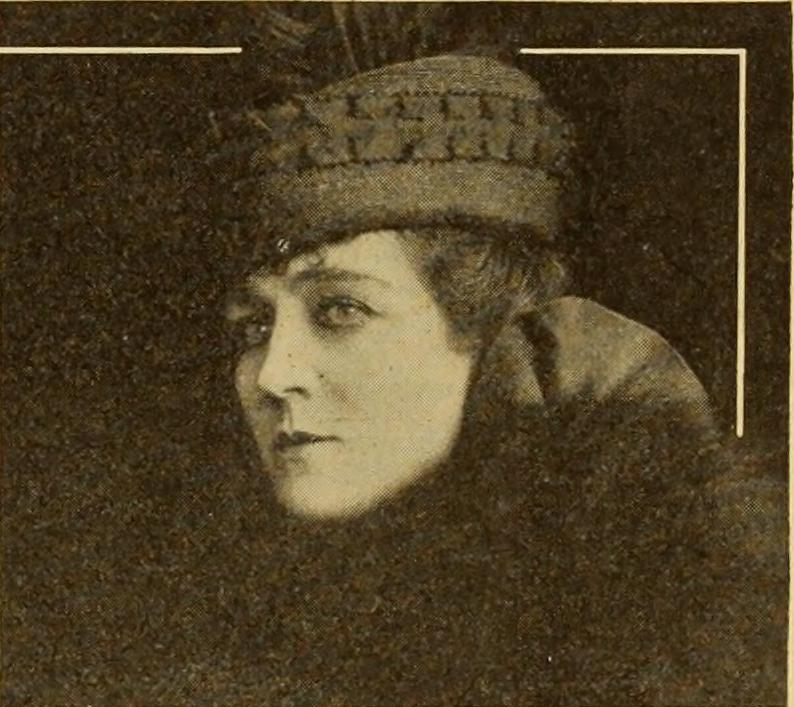
- Katherine Griffith, from a 1916 publication
- Born: September 30, 1876; San Francisco, California
- Died: October 17, 1921 (aged 45); Los Angeles, California
- Other names: Catherine Kiernan Griffith
- Occupation: Actress
- Children: 3, including Gordon Griffith

Katherine Kiernan Griffith (September 30, 1876 – October 17, 1921), also seen as Catherine Kiernan, was an American character actress on stage and in silent films.

== Early life ==
Catherine Kiernan was born in San Francisco, the daughter of Irish immigrants Peter Kiernan and Catherine Kiernan.

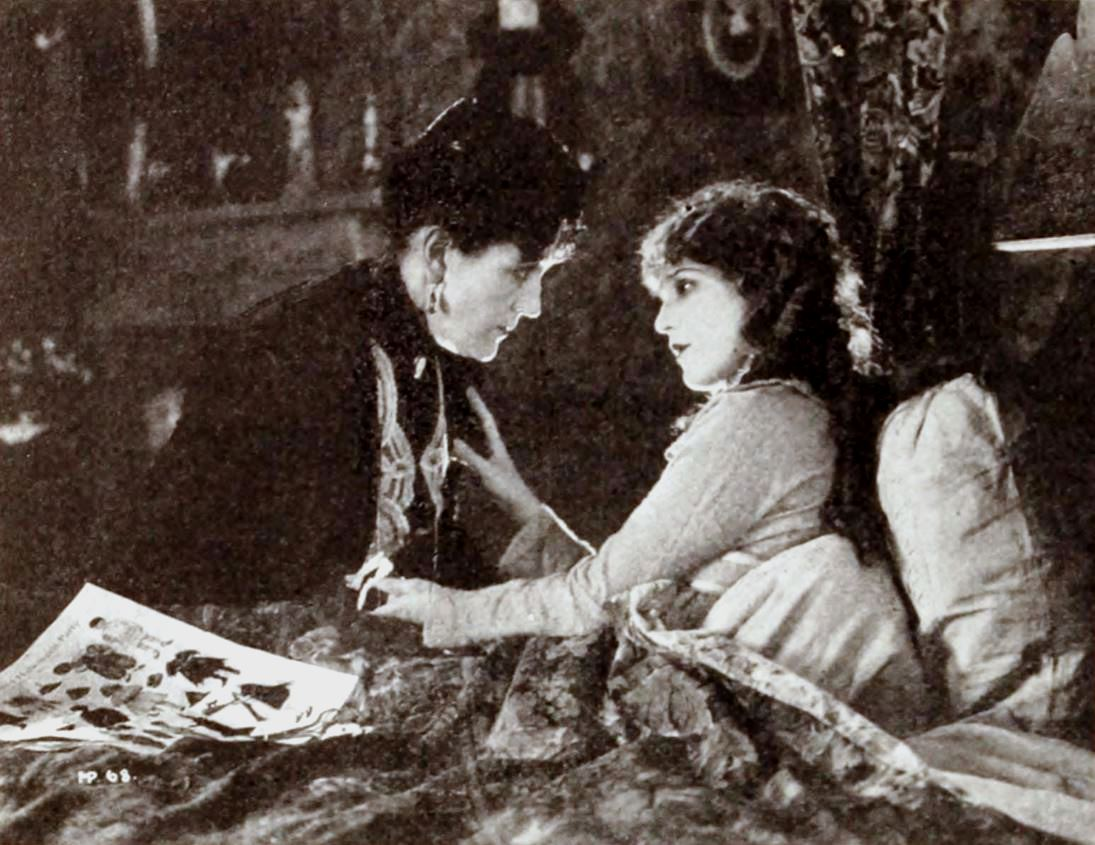
Katherine Griffith and Mary Pickford in Pollyanna (1920)

== Career ==
Griffith had a career in vaudeville and the musical theatre before moving into film work. Described as a "large, commanding woman", she appeared in dozens of silent films, including Tess of the D'Urbervilles (1913), The Gray Nun of Belgium (1915), The Greater Power (1916), Murdered by Mistake (1916), A Little Princess (1917) with Mary Pickford, In Judgment Of (1918), A Yankee Princess (1919) with Bessie Love, The Woman Thou Gavest Me (1919), The Spite Bride (1919) with Olive Thomas, The Woman Next Door (1919), Pollyanna (1920), again with Mary Pickford, Huckleberry Finn (1920), with her son Gordon Griffith as Tom Sawyer, Mid-Channel (1920), and They Shall Pay (1921).

== Personal life ==
Kiernan married fellow actor Harry Sutherland Griffith in 1897. They had three children, Gordon, Graham, and Gertrude; her son Gordon became a child actor. Katherine Griffith died suddenly from a stroke in 1921, aged 45 years, at her home in Los Angeles.
