= Cowboy Holiday =

1934 film

- Theatrical release poster
- Directed by: Robert F. Hill
- Written by: Robert F. Hill
- Produced by: Arthur Alexander; Max Alexander
- Starring: See below
- Cinematography: Gilbert Warrenton
- Edited by: Holbrook N. Todd
- Distributed by: Beacon Productions
- Release date: December 1, 1934
- Running time: 56 minutes
- Country: United States
- Language: English

Cowboy Holiday is a 1934 American Western film directed by Robert F. Hill, produced by Max Alexander and Arthur Alexander for Beacon Productions and starring Guinn "Big Boy" Williams and Richard Alexander. It was remade as Law and Lead (1936).

== Plot ==
Buck Sawyer's friend, Sheriff Simpson, will lose his job if he doesn't catch the notorious bandit known as The Juarez Kid. Buck sets out to help Simpson catch the outlaw and keep his job.

== Cast ==
- Guinn "Big Boy" Williams as Buck Sawyer
- Janet Chandler as Ruth Hopkins
- Julian Rivero as Pablo 'Juarez Kid' Escovar
- Richard Alexander as Deputy Swanson, alias Walt Gregor
- John Elliott as Sheriff Hank Simpson
- Julia Bejarano as Mona Escovar
- Alma Chester as Ma Simpson

== Soundtrack ==
- Guinn "Big Boy" Williams - "Bury Me Not on the Lone Prairie"
