= The Golden West (1932 film) =

1932 film

- Theatrical release poster
- Directed by: David Howard
- Screenplay by: Gordon Rigby
- Produced by: Edmund Grainger
- Starring: George O'Brien; Marion Burns; Arthur Pierson; Janet Chandler; Onslow Stevens; Emmett Corrigan
- Cinematography: Daniel B. Clark
- Edited by: Mildred Johnston
- Music by: Arthur Lange
- Production company: Fox Film Corporation
- Distributed by: Fox Film Corporation
- Release date: October 30, 1932
- Running time: 74 minutes
- Country: United States
- Language: English

The Golden West is a 1932 American Pre-Code Western film directed by David Howard and written by Gordon Rigby. The film stars George O'Brien, Janet Chandler, Marion Burns, Arthur Pierson, Onslow Stevens and Emmett Corrigan. It is based on the 1909 novel The Last Trail by Zane Grey. The film was released on October 30, 1932, by Fox Film Corporation. It is based on a novel by Zane Grey.

== Plot ==
Lovers David Lunch and Betty Summers are caught in the feud between their two families. When David kills the Summers son, he escapes to the West. He marries and when his boy is two he and his wife are killed by Indians who take the boy. Twenty years later the boy is now the Indian chief. Betty's daughter is nearby and the two are destined to meet.

== Cast ==
- George O'Brien as David Lynch / Motano
- Janet Chandler as Betty Summers / Betty Brown
- Marion Burns as Helen Sheppard
- Arthur Pierson as Robert Summers
- Onslow Stevens as Calvin Brown
- Emmett Corrigan as Colonel Horace Summers
- Bert Hanlon as Dennis Epstein
- Edmund Breese as Sam Lynch
- Frank Hagney as Chief Grey Eagle (uncredited)
- Hattie McDaniel as Servant (uncredited; her first feature role)
