= Speed Limited =

1935 film

- Film poster
- Directed by: Albert Herman
- Written by: Ralph Graves
- Produced by: George P. Reagan Jr.
- Starring: Evelyn Brent
- Cinematography: William Hyer
- Edited by: Dan Milner
- Production company: Regent Pictures
- Distributed by: Regent Pictures
- Release date: 1935
- Running time: 52 minutes
- Country: United States
- Language: English

Speed Limited is a 1935 American crime film directed by Albert Herman and starring Evelyn Brent. It was made by the low-budget Poverty Row company Regent Pictures

== Cast ==
- Ralph Graves as Jerry Paley
- Evelyn Brent as Natalie
- Claudia Dell as Marjorie
- Andy Rice as Smitty
- Walter Worden as Government man
- Vance Carroll as Tommy
- Gordon Griffith as Government man
- Fred 'Snowflake' Toones as First Pullman Porter, Vegas train station
