= Claudia Dell =

American actress, dancer, and showgirl (1909–1977)

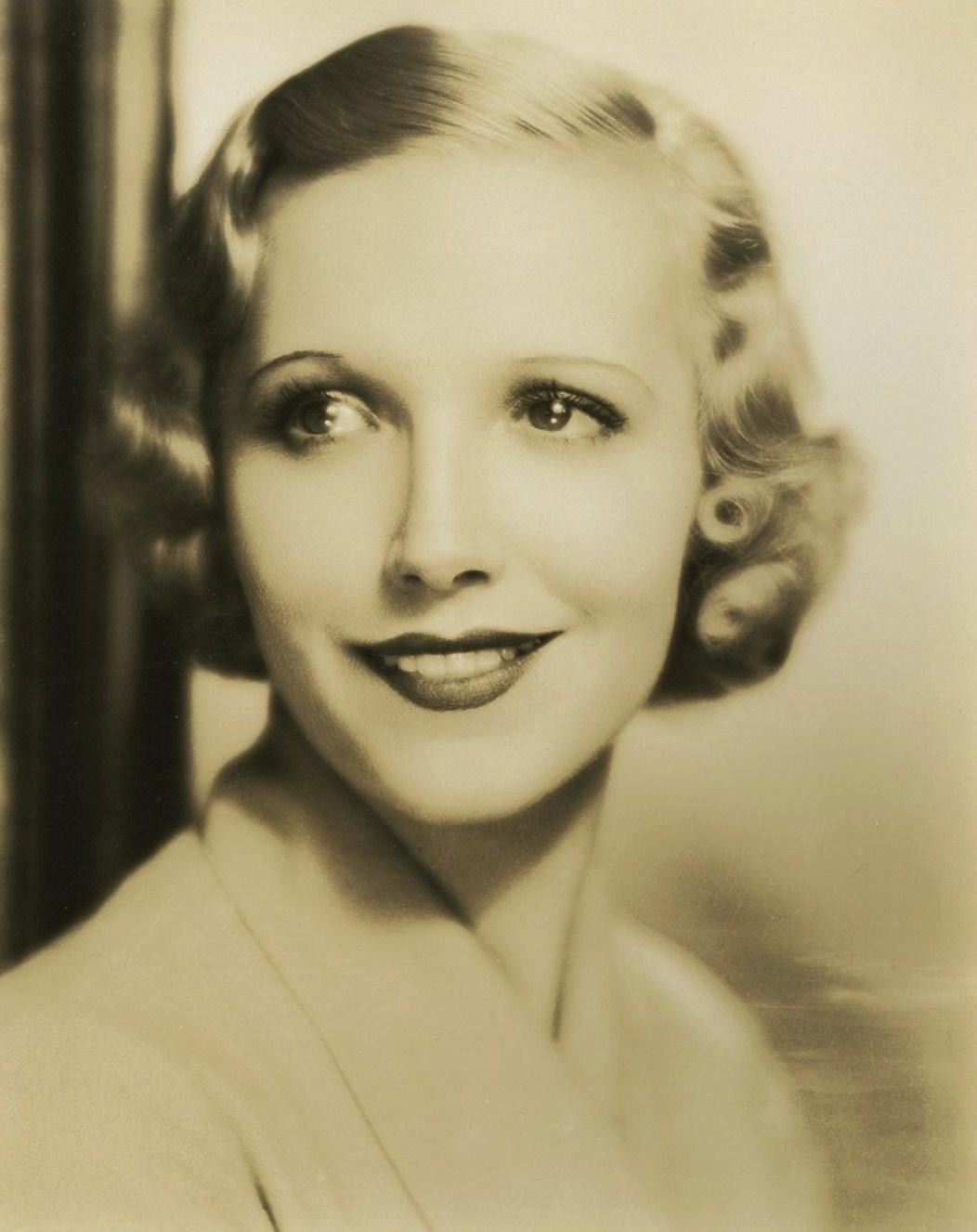
- Dell in 1932
- Born: Claudia Dell Smith; January 10, 1910; San Antonio, Texas, U.S.
- Died: September 5, 1977 (aged 67); Los Angeles, California, U.S.
- Resting place: Valhalla Memorial Park Cemetery
- Occupation: Actress
- Years active: 1927–1972
- Spouses: Phillip G. Offin (m. 1928; div. 1930) Edward Silton (m. 1934; div. 1947) Daniel Emmett (m. 1947, divorced)

Claudia Dell (born Claudia Dell Smith; January 10, 1909 – September 5, 1977) was an American showgirl and actress of the stage and movies.

== Early life ==
Dell moved with her mother to New York City in late 1924 or early 1925 to visit Dell's aunt, Claudia Coleman. The aunt reportedly inspired Dell to seek a career on stage, and she became a student of Ned Wayburn.

== Stage career ==
Dell began her professional career on Broadway in 1925 as a chorus member in Gay Paree (1925-1926). She went on to perform in the Ziegfeld Follies of 1927 and Rosalie (1927-1928).

== Hollywood ==
In 1930, Dell was signed by Warner Brothers to appear in the film Sweet Kitty Bellairs. Shortly after, Al Jolson reportedly demanded that she play opposite him in Big Boy (1930). She was then cast in River's End (1930). She appeared in over 30 films until her film career ended in 1944.

In February 1931 Dell signed with RKO, two months after obtaining a release from her contract with Warner Bros. RKO vice-president William K. LeBaron said that the studio planned to cast her in leading-lady roles until her name became more established with the public.

== Radio and television ==
After her film career faltered, Dell was under contract for five years with RKO and did many Lux Radio Theater programs for Cecil B. DeMille and Orson Welles. She had her television show in New York, titled Leave It to the Girls.

In the early 1970s, Dell had a syndicated radio program that aired in the Midwest titled The Claudia Dell Show. She wrote a syndicated column for eight years and, in 1973, completed a collaboration with English author Helga Moray. This was for a television script considered for the Theater of the Week program.

== Personal life ==
Dell and Phillip G. Offin married when she was 17. She obtained a divorce from him two years later, in 1930. On December 29, 1934, Dell married theatrical agent Edward Silton. She gave her age as 22. They later divorced. She married retired chewing gum manufacturer Daniel Emmett in 1947.

== Modeling instructor ==
She worked as a receptionist in a Hollywood beauty shop and appeared in early television dramas. In 1973, she became the student director of the John Robert Powers School of Charm and Modeling in Sherman Oaks, California, and Woodland Hills Promenade. Previously, she worked for 12 years as director of the John Robert Powers School in Beverly Hills, California. Dell said "There is no better work than being associated with a school which helps mold young people for the future and one that gives a whole new dimension to a woman's life."

== False statements in Bette Davis Book ==
Bette Davis wrote in her 1962 autobiography that: "Little Claudia Dell, whose image was used as Columbia Pictures signature for years, later used it as another kind of jumping-off point. She plunged in despair to her death from the first letter of the very word that crushed her." None of this is true. Davis later claimed that she "made up the name" and "never knew such a person existed."

== Death ==
Dell died in Los Angeles in September 1977. Her remains are interred at Valhalla Memorial Park Cemetery in North Hollywood.

== Partial filmography ==
- Montana Moon (1930) - Froggy's Blonde Girlfriend (uncredited)
- Big Boy (1930) - Annabel
- 50 Million Frenchmen (1931) - Lu Lu Carroll
- Bachelor Apartment (1931) - Lita Andrews
- Confessions of a Co-Ed (1931) - Peggy
- Left Over Ladies (1931) - Patricia
- Scandal for Sale (1932) - Dorothy Pepper
- Guilty or Not Guilty (1932) - Ruth Payne
- Destry Rides Again (1932) - Sally Dangerfield
- The Midnight Lady (1932) - Jean Austin
- Hearts of Humanity (1932) - Ruth Sneider
- Midnight Warning (1932) - Enid Van Buren
- The Big Bluff (1933) - Unknown role
- The Woman Who Dared (1933) - Mickey Martin - Factory Owner
- The Woman Condemned (1934) - Barbara Hammond
- Cleopatra (1934) - Octavia
- Trails End (1935) - Mrs. Janet Moorehead
- Midnight Phantom (1935) - Diana Sullivan
- Speed Limited (1935) - Marjorie
- The Lost City (1935, Serial) - Natcha Manyus (archive footage)
- Ghost Patrol (1936) - Natalie Brent
- Yellow Cargo (1936) - Fay Temple
- What Becomes of the Children? (1936) - Gayle Adams
- We're in the Legion Now! (1936) - Yvonne Cartier
- Boots of Destiny (1937) - Alice Wilson
- A Bride for Henry (1937) - Helen Van Orden
- Algiers (1938) - Marie
- Angels with Dirty Faces (1938)
- Juarez and Maximilian (1939) - Agnes Salm (uncredited)
- The Mad Empress (1939) - Agnes Salm (uncredited)
- Sauce for the Gander (1940) - Mrs. Rogers
- Spotlight Serenade (1943) - Betty
- Call of the Jungle (1944) - Gracie
- Black Magic (1944) - Vera Starkey

== Bibliography ==
- Port Arthur, Texas News, Texas Girl Is Latest Find, Sunday, September 21, 1930, Page Nine.
- Port Arthur News, Claudia Dell Weds Theatrical Agent, Sunday, December 30, 1934, Page 2.
- Van Nuys, California The News, Today's Personality Is...Claudia Dell, Thursday, November 15, 1973. Page 5-C.
