= Blazing Justice =

1936 film

- Film poster
- Directed by: Albert Herman
- Written by: Zarah Tazil
- Produced by: Ray Kirkwood
- Cinematography: William Hyer
- Edited by: Holbrook N. Todd
- Production company: Ray Kirkwood Productions
- Distributed by: Spectrum Pictures
- Release date: 1936
- Running time: 60 minutes
- Country: United States
- Language: English

Blazing Justice is a 1936 American Western film directed by Albert Herman and written by Zarah Tazil.

== Plot ==
In a saloon, Ray Healy witnesses three outlaws kill a sheriff, Ray subdues two of them, but one named Max gets away. During the pursuit Max manages to bludgeon an old ranch owner and take his life savings that he had in a money belt.

== Cast ==
- Bill Cody as Ray Healy
- Gertrude Messinger as Virginia Peterson
- Gordon Griffith as Max
- Milburn Morante as Pop, Bearded Barfly
- Budd Buster as Bob Peterson, Virginia's Father
- Frank Yaconelli as Rusty, Guitar Player
- Charles Tannen
