= Mystery Range =

1937 film

- Produced by: Sam Katzman
- Production company: Victory Pictures Corporation
- Release date: 1937
- Country: United States
- Language: English

Mystery Range is a 1937 American Western film starring Tom Tyler. It is one of a number of films Tyler made for producer Sam Katzman.

== Cast ==
- Tom Tyler as Tom Wade
- Jerry Bergh as Jennifer Travis
- Milburn Morante as Jim
- Jim Correy as One of Morgan's men
- Dick Alexander as Lupe Bardes
