= Scouts to the Rescue =

1939 film by Alan James, Ray Taylor

- Directed by: Alan James; Ray Taylor
- Written by: Irving Crump; Wyndham Gittens; George H. Plympton; Basil Dickey; Joseph F. Poland
- Produced by: Henry MacRae
- Starring: Jackie Cooper; David Durand; Bill Cody, Jr. Vondell Darr; William Ruhl
- Cinematography: William A. Sickner
- Edited by: Saul A. Goodkind; Irving Birnbaum; Joseph Gluck; Louis Sackin; Alvin Todd
- Music by: Charles Previn
- Distributed by: Universal Pictures
- Release date: January 17, 1939
- Running time: 12 chapters (231 minutes)
- Country: United States
- Language: English

Scouts to the Rescue is a 1939 Universal film serial directed by Alan James and Ray Taylor. It starred Jackie Cooper and Bill Cody Jr.

== Premise ==
A troop of Boy Scouts use a treasure map to find a stash of counterfeit notes and a lost tribe with a secret Radium deposit.

== Cast ==
- Jackie Cooper as Bruce Scott, leader of the Scout Troop
- David Durand as Rip Rawson
- Bill Cody, Jr. as Skeets Scanlon
- Vondell Darr as Mary Scanlon
- William Ruhl as Hal Marvin, a G-Man on the trail of the counterfeiters
- Sidney Miller as Hermie, a Boy Scout
- Ivan Miller as Turk Mortensen
- Edwin Stanley as Pat Scanlon
- Ralph Dunn as Pug O'Toole, a gangster
- George Regas as Lukolu, high priest of the lost tribe
- Jack Mulhall as Scoutmaster Hale
- Jason Robards, Sr. as Doc, a gangster
- Dick Botiller as Leeka, Leader of Warriors
- Victor Adams as Hurst, a heavy
- Max Wagner as Joe, a henchman

== Chapter titles ==
1. Death Rides the Air
2. Avalanche of Doom
3. Trapped by the Indians
4. River of Doom
5. Descending Doom
6. Ghost Town Menace
7. Destroyed by Dynamite
8. Thundering Hoofs [sic]
9. The Fire God Strikes
10. The Battle at Ghost Town
11. Hurtling Through Space
12. The Boy Scouts' Triumph

_{Source:}

== See also ==
- List of film serials
- List of film serials by studio

Preceded by Red Barry (1938)	Universal Serial; Scouts to the Rescue (1939)	Succeeded by Buck Rogers (1939)
