= Danger Ahead (1935 film) =

1935 film by Albert Herman

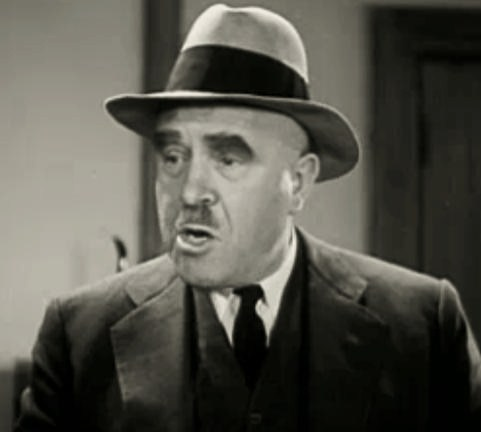
- Fred Kelsey in the film
- Directed by: Albert Herman
- Screenplay by: Al Martin
- Story by: Peter B. Kyne
- Produced by: Sam Katzman
- Cinematography: William Hyer
- Edited by: Dan Milner
- Production company: Victory Pictures Corporation
- Distributed by: Victory Pictures Corporation
- Release date: July 19, 1935 (premiere)
- Running time: 65 minutes
- Country: United States
- Language: English

Danger Ahead is a 1935 American crime drama film directed by Albert Herman, produced and released by Victory Pictures Corporation.

== Plot ==
Captain Matthews is paid $40,000 for a silk shipment from China. The Green Eagle Café owner has the captain called away for a phone call but is robbed of the money. Local reporter sees the robbery and after a fist fight gets the money back. He runs into the local delicatessen and hides the money. The reporter gets a headline story and gets to meet the captain's daughter. Conrad and his henchman pose as the captain to get the cash returned.

== Cast ==
- Lawrence Gray as Jerry Mason, reporter
- Sheila Bromley as Lorraine Matthews, Captain's daughter
- J. Farrell MacDonald as Harry Cromwell, the city editor
- Fuzzy Knight as Fred Klein - butcher
- Bryant Washburn as Nick Conrad - gangster
- Fred Kelsey as Detective O'Brien
- John Elliott as Captain Matthews
- Eddie Phillips as Eddie, henchman
- Arthur Loft as Pete, balding henchman
- Herschel Mayall as Steve, henchman
- Gordon Griffith as Chuck, henchman
- Earl Dwire as Detective Sergeant
- Richard Cramer as Detective Hogan
- George Chesebro as First Mate Taylor

== Production ==
This was Katzman's first film for his company Victory Pictures. Filming started on 24 June 1935.
