= Hot Off the Press =

1935 film

- Directed by: Albert Herman
- Written by: Gordon Griffith; Peter B. Kyne; Victor Potel
- Produced by: Sam Katzman
- Starring: Jack La Rue
- Production company: Victory Pictures Corporation
- Release date: October 9, 1935
- Running time: 70 minutes
- Country: United States
- Language: English

Hot Off the Press is a 1935 American drama film directed by Albert Herman. It was the second of eight adaptations of Peter B. Kyne stories.

== Plot ==
Bill Jeffry is a reporter who leaves The Evening Call in favor of rival Star Bulletin. When one of the Star's intrepid newsboys, Mickey Karnes, is attacked, Bill, who was merely in the wrong place at the wrong time, finds himself falsely accused of the attack. He sets about unmasking the real criminal.

== Cast ==
- Jack La Rue as Bill Jeffrey
- Virginia Pine as Brenda Johnson
- Monte Blue
- Fuzzy Knight
- Fred Kelsey
- Edward Hearn
- James C. Morton
- Mickey Rentschler as Mickey Karnes
