= Bars of Hate =

1935 film

- Film poster
- Directed by: Albert Herman
- Screenplay by: Al Martin
- Story by: Peter B. Kyne
- Produced by: Sam Katzman
- Starring: Regis Toomey
- Cinematography: William Hyer
- Edited by: Dan Milner
- Production company: Victory Pictures Corporation
- Distributed by: Victory Pictures Corporation
- Release date: November 1, 1935
- Running time: 57 minutes
- Country: United States
- Language: English

Bars of Hate is a 1935 American crime film directed by Albert Herman.

== Cast ==
- Regis Toomey as Ted Clark
- Sheila Terry as Ann Dawson
- Molly O'Day as Gertie
- Snub Pollard as Danny, the Pickpocket
- Robert Warwick as The Governor
- Fuzzy Knight as Montague
- Gordon Griffith as Jim Grant
