= Zarah Tazil =

American actress

- Occupations: Screenwriter, actress
- Spouse: Ray Kirkwood

Zarah Tazil (sometimes credited as Zara Tazil) was an actress, assistant director, and screenwriter who made a name for herself working on Western B-movies in the 1930s. "Zarah Tazil" was likely a stage name, although her real name is unknown. She was married to director/producer Ray Kirkwood; the pair left Hollywood after 1936's Outlaws of the Range.

In 1937 it was announced that Tazil would write four films to be produced in Africa, Unknown, When Hell Broke Loose, The Devil's Finger and Black Widow to be produced in Egypt. None of the films would be made.

== Selected filmography ==
As writer:

- Outlaws of the Range (1936)
- Blazing Justice (1936)
- Lawless Border (1935)
- The Reckless Buckaroo (1935)

As actress:

- A Scream in the Night (1935)
- The Shadow of Silk Lennox (1935) (also assistant director)
- The Cyclone Ranger (1935)
- Six Gun Justice (1935)
