= Ghost Patrol =

1936 film by Sam Newfield

- Directed by: Sam Newfield
- Written by: Wyndham Gittens (screenplay); Joseph O'Donnell (story)
- Produced by: Sigmund Neufeld; Leslie Simmonds
- Starring: Tim McCoy; Claudia Dell; Walter Miller
- Cinematography: Jack Greenhalgh
- Edited by: John English (as Jack English)
- Distributed by: Puritan Pictures
- Release date: August 3, 1936
- Running time: 60 minutes
- Country: United States
- Language: English

Ghost Patrol is a 1936 American Western film directed by Sam Newfield.

== Plot ==
A scientific genius has invented a machine capable of causing planes to crash. He uses it on planes loaded with valuables. Various characters become involved in conspiracies and double crosses in an attempt to stop him.

== Cast ==
- Tim McCoy as Tim Caverly
- Claudia Dell as Natalie Brent
- Walter Miller as Ted Dawson
- Wheeler Oakman as Kincaid
- James P. Burtis as Henry Brownlee
- Lloyd Ingraham as Prof. Jonathan Brent
- Dick Curtis as Henchie Charlie
