= Ace High (1918 film) =

1918 film

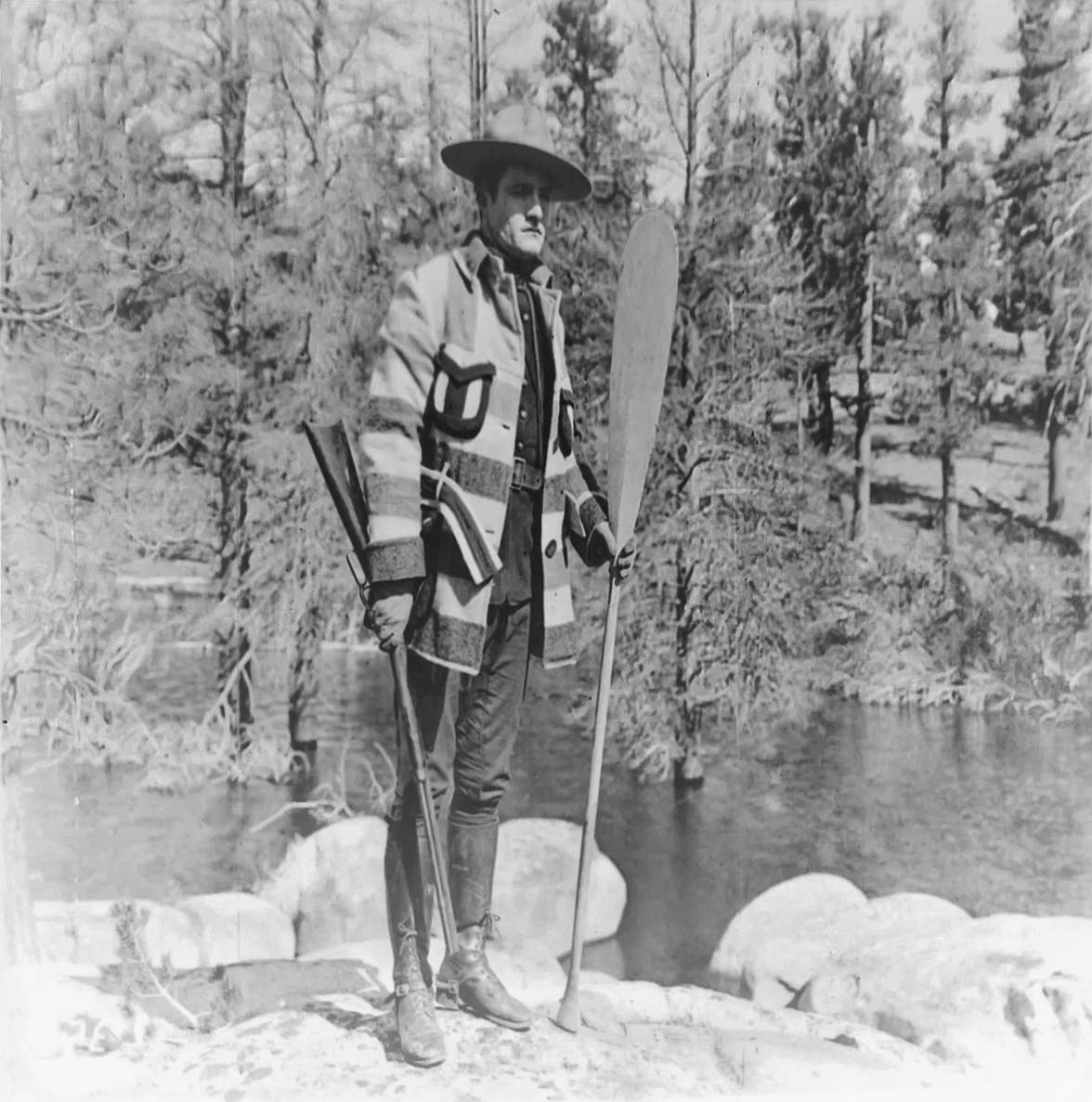
- Tom Mix in Ace High
- Directed by: Lynn Reynolds
- Written by: Lynn Reynolds
- Produced by: William Fox
- Starring: Tom Mix; Lloyd Perl; Lewis Sargent
- Cinematography: Devereaux Jennings; William A. Reinhart; George Richter
- Production company: Fox Film
- Distributed by: Fox Film
- Release date: June 9, 1918
- Running time: 50 minutes
- Country: United States
- Language: Silent (English intertitles)

Ace High is a 1918 American silent Western film directed by Lynn Reynolds and starring Tom Mix, Lloyd Perl, and Lewis Sargent.

== Plot ==
Jean Rivard is a heroic Canadian Mountie who rescues his childhood sweetheart Annette Dupre from the clutches of an American sheriff. Action takes place primarily at a saloon called the Ace High. The bar is a popular hangout for criminals because, at a moment's notice, it can be slid across the room from the United States into Canada, or vice versa as necessary.

== Cast ==
- Tom Mix as Jean Rivard
  - Lloyd Perl as Jean Rivard (age 10)
  - Lewis Sargent as Jean Rivard (age 15)
- Kathleen O'Connor as Aneette Dupre
  - Virginia Lee Corbin as Annette Dupre (child)
- Lawrence Peyton as Jack Keefe
- Colin Chase as Baptiste Dupre
- Jay Morley as Harvey Wright
- Pat Chrisman as Louis Cartier

== Themes ==
Set along the Alaska-Canadian border, the film explores the arbitrariness of legality on the fringes of nation-states through the cliche of the heroic Mountie saving a girl from a villainous sheriff.

== Production ==
Ace High was the second of 17 Tom Mix feature films Lynn Reynolds directed over an eight-year period. The film was the first of three Tom Mix films shot in the Big Bear area.
