= Left Over Ladies =

1931 film by Erle C. Kenton

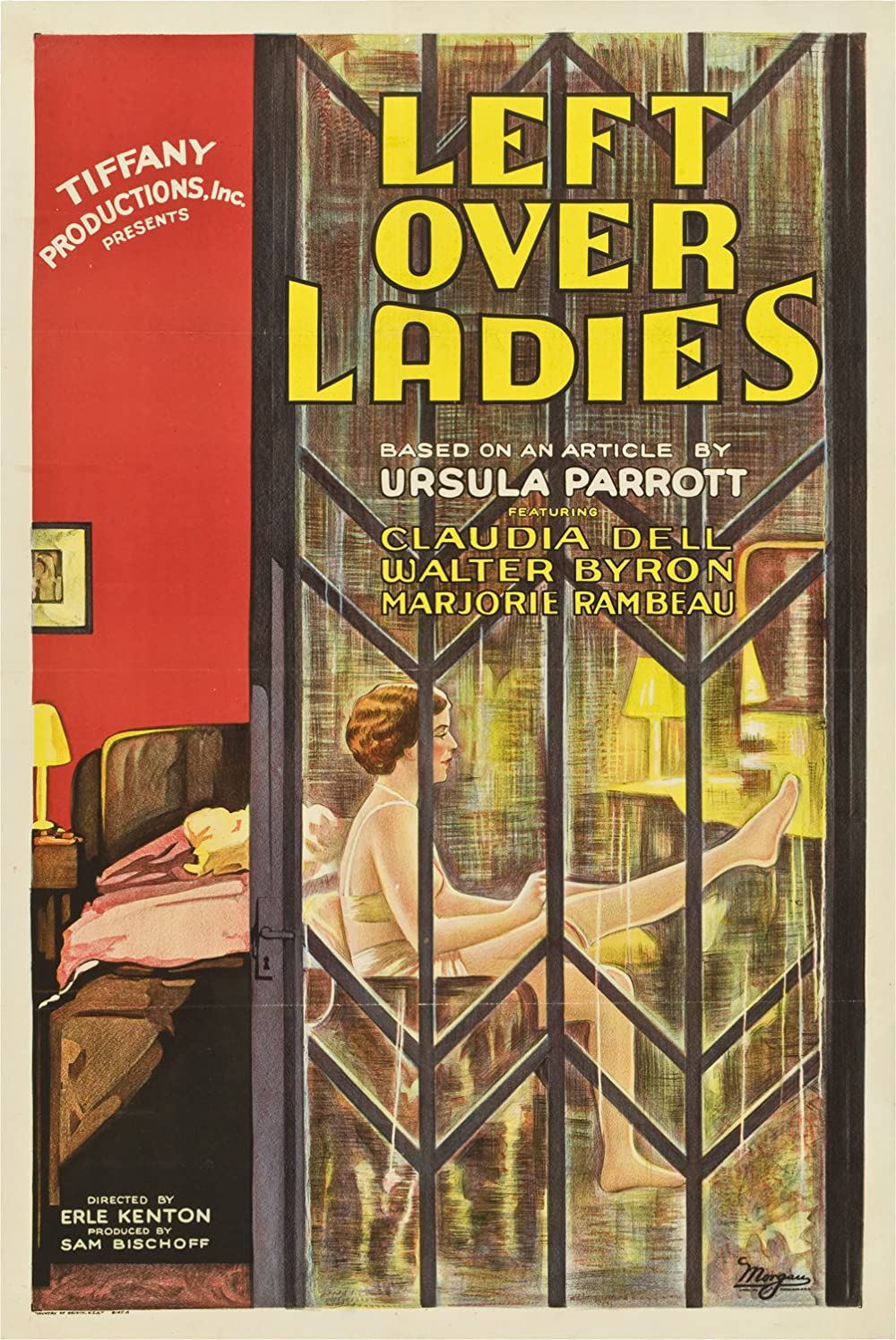
- Directed by: Erle C. Kenton
- Written by: Robert Presnell Sr.; Ursula Parrott
- Produced by: Robert Presnell Sr.
- Starring: Claudia Dell; Marjorie Rambeau; Walter Byron
- Cinematography: John Stumar
- Edited by: Martin G. Cohn
- Production company: Tiffany Pictures
- Distributed by: Tiffany Pictures
- Release date: October 1, 1931
- Running time: 69 minutes
- Country: United States
- Language: English

Left Over Ladies (also written as Leftover Ladies) is a 1931 American drama film starring Claudia Dell, Marjorie Rambeau and Walter Byron. Produced by Tiffany Pictures, it was originally going to be directed by Lloyd Bacon before Erle C. Kenton took over.

== Plot ==
After a society divorce, Patricia Worth refuses any alimony from her wealthy husband and plans to make a living as a writer. She encounters a recently divorced writer who has made a success of his book celebrating divorce, but is, in truth, distraught that his wife has left him. They apparently fall in love, but both their former partners, including Patricia's husband Ronny, who has become entangled with a gold digger, decide they want them back.

== Cast ==
- Claudia Dell as Patricia
- Marjorie Rambeau as the Duchess
- Walter Byron as Ronny
- Alan Mowbray as Jerry
- Rita La Roy as Vera
- Roscoe Karns as 'Scoop'
- Dorothy Revier as Amy
- Selmer Jackson as Churchill
- Franklyn Farnum as Benson
- Buster Phelps as Buddy
- Bill Elliott as escort
