= A Yankee Princess =

1919 silent film by David Smith

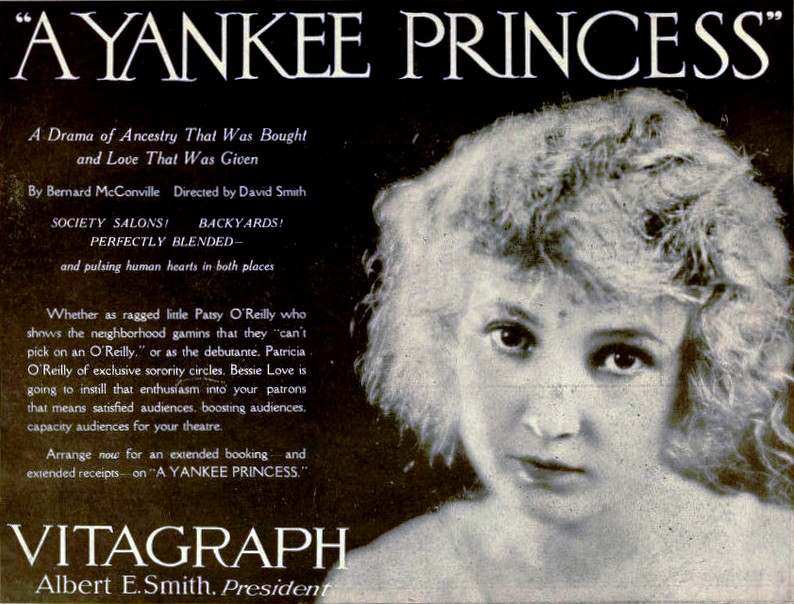
- Magazine advertisement
- Directed by: David Smith
- Written by: Bessie Love (scenario)
- Based on: "The Yankee Princess" (story) by Bernard McConville
- Starring: Bessie Love
- Cinematography: Clyde De Vinna
- Production company: Vitagraph Company of America
- Distributed by: Vitagraph Company of America
- Release date: April 21, 1919 (U.S.)
- Running time: 5 reels; 4,646 feet
- Country: United States
- Language: Silent (English intertitles)

A Yankee Princess is a 1919 American silent comedy-drama film produced and distributed by the Vitagraph Company of America. It was directed by David Smith and stars Bessie Love, who also wrote the screenplay. It is a lost film.

== Plot ==
Poor inventor Michael O'Reilly is an immigrant from Ireland living in the United States. When he suddenly comes into money, he sends his daughter Patsy is sent to an exclusive boarding school. The snobby students shun her until she claims to be an Irish princess, and they then demand to see her coat of arms. To meet this need, her father buys the family heirlooms of the destitute Irish Windbourne estate.

Lord Windbourne himself appears and becomes engaged to Patsy, with the intention of reclaiming his treasures and her fortune. When she learns his true character, she breaks the engagement, but Windbourne threatens to reveal the O'Reillys' deception.

Handsome young Irishman Larry Burke appears with proof that he is the real Lord Windbourne. He proposes to Patsy, who accepts.

== Cast ==
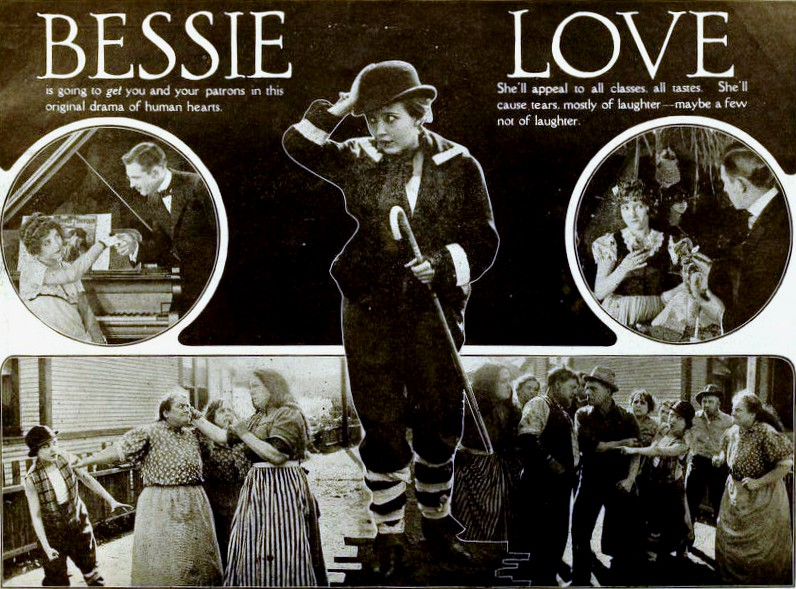
Magazine advertisement

- Bessie Love as Patsy O'Reilly
- Robert Gordon as Larry Burke
- George Pearce as Michael O'Reilly
- Aggie Herring as Mrs. O'Reilly
- J. Carlton Wetherby as Lord Windbourne
- Katherine Griffith as Lady Windbourne
- Lydia Yeamans Titus as Molly McGuire
- Max Asher as the French chef

== Reception ==
The film received generally positive reviews, although the story was deemed predictable. It was commercially successful. The photography was highly praised, as was the acting, in particular that of Bessie Love.
