= Victory Pictures Corporation =

US film production company

Victory Pictures Corporation was a California-based film production and distribution company that operated from 1935 to 1939. It was owned by Sam Katzman and specialised in making low-budget movies, predominantly Westerns. It made two serials and 30 films, including some of the Western series of Bob Steele and Tim McCoy. It also made eight films based on the works of Peter B. Kyne.

The studio plant caught fire in 1937, causing $50,000 worth of damage.

== Selected filmography ==
- Bars of Hate (1935)
- Danger Ahead (1935)
- Hot Off the Press (1935)
- Put on the Spot (1936)
- Kelly of the Secret Service (1936)
- Feud of the Trail (1937)
- Mystery Range (1937)
