= Albert Herman =

American actor, screenwriter and film director (1887–1958)

- Born: 22 February 1887; Troy, New York; United States
- Died: 28 September 1958 (aged 71); Los Angeles, California, United States (age 71)
- Other name: Adam Herman Foelker
- Occupations: Director, Screenwriter
- Years active: 1914 - 1951 (film)

Albert Herman (1887–1958) was an American actor, screenwriter and film director. Herman was a prolific director, working mainly on low-budget movies for companies such as Producers Releasing Corporation. He is sometimes credited as Al Herman.

== Selected filmography ==
=== Director ===
- Sporting Chance (1931)
- Exposed (1932)
- The Big Chance (1933)
- The Whispering Shadow (1933, serial)
- Twisted Rails (1934)
- Hot Off the Press (1935)
- Speed Limited (1935)
- Danger Ahead (1935)
- The Drunkard (1935)
- Bars of Hate (1935)
- Gun Play (1935)
- Big Boy Rides Again (1935)
- Western Frontier (1935)
- Million Dollar Haul (1935)
- What Price Crime (1935)
- The Cowboy and the Bandit (1935)
- Trails End (1935)
- Blazing Justice (1936)
- Outlaws of the Range (1936)
- Fugitive in the Sky (Unbilled) (1936)
- The Black Coin (1936, serial)
- The Clutching Hand (1936, serial)
- Valley of Terror (1937)
- Renfrew of the Royal Mounted (1937)
- Rollin' Plains (1938)
- Where the Buffalo Roam (1938)
- Starlight Over Texas (1938)
- On the Great White Trail (1938)
- The Utah Trail (1938)
- Song of the Buckaroo (1938)
- Sundown on the Prairie (1939)
- Rollin' Westward (1939)
- Man from Texas (1939)
- Down the Wyoming Trail (1939)
- The Golden Trail (1940)
- Rhythm of the Rio Grande (1940)
- Pals of the Silver Sage (1940)
- Rainbow Over the Range (1940)
- Roll Wagons Roll (1940)
- Arizona Frontier (1940)
- Take Me Back to Oklahoma (1940)
- Rollin' Home to Texas (1940)
- Gentleman from Dixie (1941)
- The Pioneers (1941)
- Miss V from Moscow (1942)
- A Yank in Libya (1942)
- The Rangers Take Over (1942)
- The Dawn Express (1942)
- Bad Men of Thunder Gap (1943)
- Rogues' Gallery (1944)
- Delinquent Daughters (1944)
- Shake Hands with Murder (1944)
- The Missing Corpse (1945)
- The Phantom of 42nd Street (1945)

=== Actor ===
- Talent Scout (1937)
- Swanee River (1939)

== Bibliography ==
- Dixon, Wheeler. Producers Releasing Corporation: A Comprehensive Filmography and History. McFarland, 1986.
