= Fay Lemport =

American actress (born c. 1901)

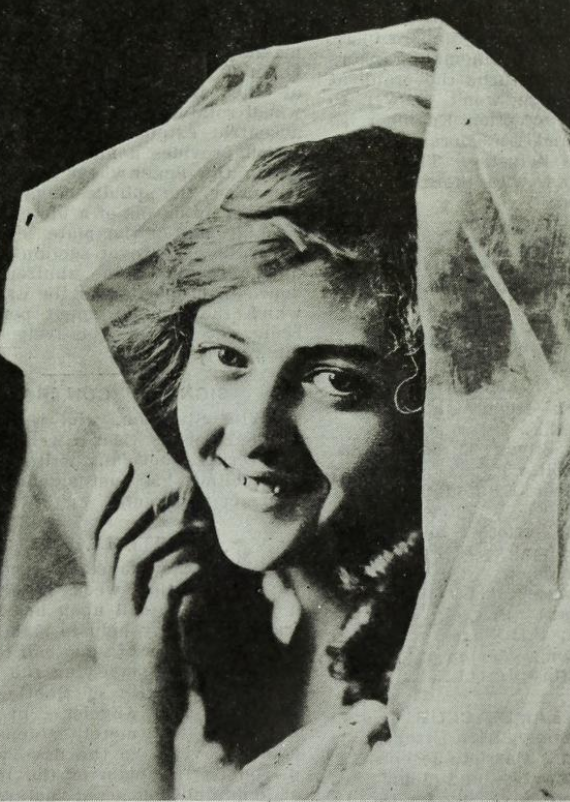
Fay Lemport, from a 1919 publication

Fay Lemport (born c. 1901) was an American actress known for her role in Daddy-Long-Legs (1919). She appeared in three films between 1919 and 1920.

A 1919 article said that she had received 39 marriage proposals in one month. After receiving so many proposals she took a brief refuge in the study of psychoanalysis.

== Selected filmography ==
- The Heart of Youth (1919)
- Daddy-Long-Legs (1919)
- Save Me, Sadie (1920) (short)
- Huckleberry Finn (1920)
