= Huckleberry Finn (1920 film) =

1920 film by William Desmond Taylor

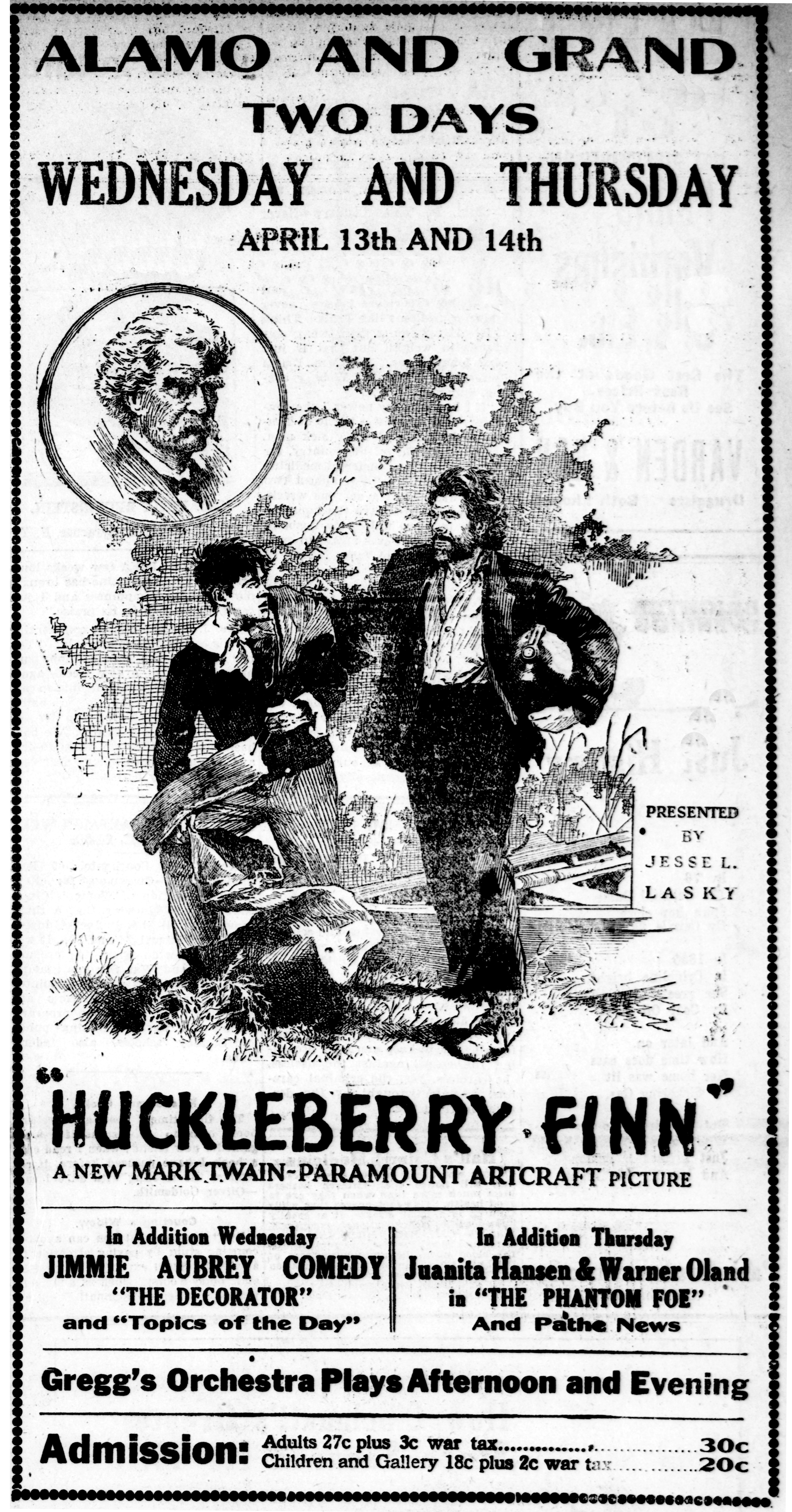
- Newspaper advertisement
- Directed by: William Desmond Taylor
- Written by: Julia Crawford Ivers (scenario)
- Based on: Adventures of Huckleberry Finn by Mark Twain
- Produced by: Adolph Zukor; Jesse L. Lasky; William Desmond Taylor
- Starring: Lewis Sargent; Martha Mattox; Esther Ralston; Howard Ralston
- Cinematography: Frank E. Garbutt
- Production company: Famous Players–Lasky / Artcraft
- Distributed by: Paramount Pictures
- Release date: February 29, 1920
- Running time: 7 reels
- Country: United States
- Language: Silent (English intertitles)

Huckleberry Finn is a surviving American silent dramatic rural film from 1920, based on Mark Twain's 1884 classic Adventures of Huckleberry Finn. It was produced by Famous Players–Lasky and distributed through Paramount Pictures. William Desmond Taylor directed Huckleberry Finn, as he had the 1917 film version of Tom Sawyer, using a scenario written by Julia Crawford Ivers, who also had been the writer for Tom Sawyer.

It was the first version of the story entirely entrusted to a youth cast. Lewis Sargent (Huck) and Gordon Griffith (Tom) were child actors who already had a long and successful career and were well known to the public.

== Plot ==
As described in a film publication, Huckleberry Finn has been adopted by the Widow Douglas who plans to "civilize" him. With Tom Sawyer he forms a robber gang, and in a cave, the local boys take an oath to stick together. In his bedroom he runs into his no-account father who steals Huck's small change and later kidnaps Huck, taking him in a small boat down the river, while Tom and the gang wait for their leader to appear. Huck later escapes from a cabin where his father mistreated him, making it look as if he drowned while getting away in a canoe.

Rumors of Huck's death spreads. Jim, the widow's slave boy, hears that he is to be sold, runs off, and joins Huck on a raft. Duke and King, two broken-down actors fleeing a crowd they had fooled with a mock theatrical performance, join them. At the next town the actors again fool the people with a pretend theatrical performance with Huck acting as the doorkeeper. Further downstream the actors then impersonate the brothers of a deceased man named Wilks in an attempt to obtain the inheritance, but Huck takes the money to keep it from the actors after he is smitten by the daughter, Mary Jane Wilks. Huck and Jim leave to escape the wrath of their former companions just as the actual relatives of the dead man show up.

After peace is made when the King and Duke rejoin the group, a shabby trick is performed when the King sells Jim to a man named Phelps and then tells Huck that Jim has been lost. Upon learning the truth, Huck sets out to rescue his friend. He discovers that Mrs. Phelps is the sister of Tom's Aunt Polly. Huck poses as the nephew Tom, whom Mrs. Phelps has never met. Then the real Tom arrives, who is surprised as he believes that Huck has died. After exchanging signals, Tom poses as his brother Sid and they go through with a plan. In a struggle to get Jim away, Tom is shot in the leg. Jim escapes, and while the two youngsters are congratulating themselves at Tom's sickbed, Aunt Polly arrives and says that Jim had been freed a month earlier. She informs the Phelps of Huck's actual identity and takes him back, cured of his wandering, to the Widow Douglas.

== Cast ==
- Lewis Sargent as Huckleberry Finn
- Katherine Griffith as Widow Douglas
- Martha Mattox as Miss Watson
- Frank Lanning as Huck's father
- Orral Humphrey as The Duke
- Tom Bates as The King (*as Tom D. Bates)
- Gordon Griffith as Tom Sawyer
- Edythe Chapman as Aunt Polly
- Thelma Salter as Becky Thatcher
- George H. Reed as Jim
- L. M. Wells as Judge Thatcher
- Harry L. Rattenberry as Uncle Harvey
- Esther Ralston as Mary Jane Wilks
- Fay Lemport as Johanna
- Eunice Murdock Moore as Mrs. Sally Phelps (*as Eunice Van Moore)

=== Uncredited ===
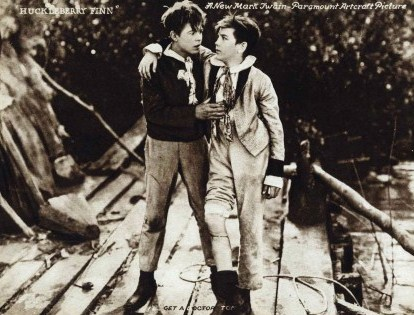
Lewis Sargent and Gordon Griffith.

- Tom Ashton as an Aged Pirate
- Howard Ralston as One of the Boys

== Preservation status ==
This film has been restored by the International Film and Photography Museum at George Eastman House.
