= Inez from Hollywood =

1924 film by Alfred E. Green

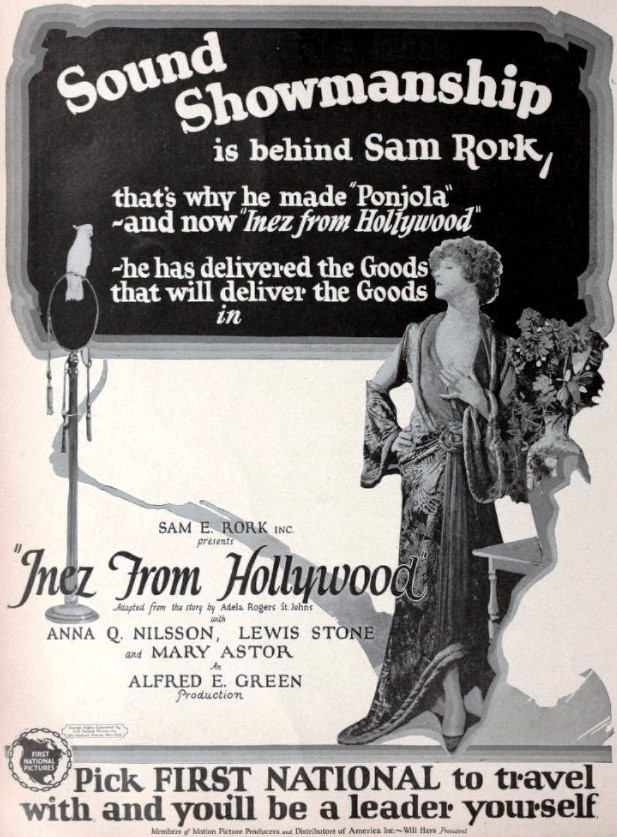
- Advertisement
- Directed by: Alfred E. Green; Jack Boland (asst. director)
- Written by: J. G. Hawks (scenario)
- Based on: "The Worst Woman in Hollywood" by Adela Rogers St. Johns
- Produced by: Sam E. Rork
- Cinematography: Arthur Edeson
- Edited by: Dorothy Arzner
- Distributed by: First National Pictures
- Release date: December 14, 1924
- Running time: 7 reels
- Country: United States
- Language: Silent (English intertitles)

Inez from Hollywood is a 1924 American silent drama film directed by Alfred E. Green. It was produced by Sam E. Rork with distribution through First National Pictures. The film is based on the short story The Worst Woman in Hollywood by Adela Rogers St. Johns. It stars Anna Q. Nilsson, Lewis Stone, and 18-year-old Mary Astor.

== Cast ==
- Anna Q. Nilsson as Inez Laranetta
- Lewis Stone as Stewart Cuyler (credited as Lewis S. Stone)
- Mary Astor as Fay Bartholdi
- Larry Wheat as Pat Summerfield (credited as Laurence Wheat)
- Rose Dione as Marie D'Albrecht
- Snitz Edwards as The Old Sport
- Harry Depp as Scoop Smith
- Ray Hallor as Freddie
- E. H. Calvert as Gardner
- Janet Chandler as Child (not credited)
- Ruth Sullivan as Child (not credited)

== Preservation ==
With no prints of Inez from Hollywood located in any film archives, it is a lost film.
