= The Cyclone Ranger =

1935 film

- Directed by: Robert F. Hill
- Written by: Oliver Drake
- Produced by: Ray Kirkwood
- Starring: Bill Cody; Nina Quartero; Eddie Gribbon
- Cinematography: Donald Biddle Keyes
- Edited by: S. Roy Luby
- Production company: Ray Kirkwood Productions
- Distributed by: Spectrum Pictures
- Release date: March 15, 1935
- Running time: 60 minutes
- Country: United States
- Language: English

The Cyclone Ranger is a 1935 American western film directed by Robert F. Hill and starring Bill Cody, Nina Quartero and Eddie Gribbon. It was made as a second feature for distribution by the Poverty Row outfit Spectrum Pictures. It was shot at the Iverson Ranch in California.

== Plot ==
A former cattle rustler attempts to go straight, but finds it hard to escape from his criminal past.

== Cast ==
- Bill Cody as The Pecos Kid
- Nina Quartero as Nita Garcia
- Eddie Gribbon as Duke
- Soledad Jiménez as Doña Castalar
- Earle Hodgins as Pancho Gonzales
- Zara Tazil as Martha - the Housekeeper
- Donald Reed as Juan Castalar
- Colin Chase as Sheriff Luke Saunders

== Bibliography ==
- Fetrow, Alan G. . Sound films, 1927-1939: a United States Filmography. McFarland, 1992.
- Pitts, Michael R. Western Movies: A Guide to 5,105 Feature Films. McFarland, 2012.
