= Million Dollar Haul =

1935 film

- Directed by: Albert Herman
- Written by: Robert Walker; Victor Potel
- Produced by: Bert Sternbach; Louis Weiss
- Starring: Reed Howes; Janet Chandler; William Farnum
- Cinematography: Harry Forbes
- Edited by: Ralph Holt
- Production company: Weiss Productions
- Distributed by: Stage & Screen Productions
- Release date: April 3, 1935
- Running time: 63 minutes
- Country: United States
- Language: English

Million Dollar Haul is a 1935 American mystery film directed by Albert Herman and starring Reed Howes, Janet Chandler and William Farnum.

== Plot ==
The owner of a Los Angeles warehouse that has been robbed calls in a private investigator, who believes that they are an inside job and sets out to find the perpetrator.

== Cast ==
- Reed Howes as Dan Kennedy
- Janet Chandler as Sheila Mallory
- William Farnum as Mr. Mallory - Sheila's Dad
- Robert Frazer as Steve Graham
- Creighton Hale as Arthur 'Curley' Roberts
- John Ince as Amos Boswell
- Vance Carroll as Henchman Ed
- Charles King as Savonne
- Tom London as Henchman Joe
- Margaret McConnell as Rea aka Operator 27
- Dick Rush as Police Commissioner
- Jack Grant as Henchman Bing
- Bruce Randall as Henchman Randy
- Dick Botiller as Henchman Dick
- Tiny Skelton as Henchman Red
- Thelma Moreland as Blue Moon Cafe Singer
- Robert Walker as Policeman
- Victor Potel as Schultz

== Bibliography ==
- Pitts, Michael R. Poverty Row Studios, 1929-1940. McFarland & Company, 2005.
