= The Branded Man (1928 film) =

1928 silent film

- Directed by: Scott Pembroke; Phil Rosen
- Written by: Clarence Aaron 'Tod' Robbins; Arthur Hoerl
- Produced by: Trem Carr
- Starring: Charles Delaney; June Marlowe; Gordon Griffith
- Cinematography: Hap Depew
- Edited by: Charles A. Post
- Production company: Trem Carr Pictures
- Distributed by: Rayart Pictures
- Release date: May 1928
- Running time: 70 minutes
- Country: United States
- Languages: Silent; English intertitles

The Branded Man is a 1928 American silent crime drama film directed by Scott Pembroke and Phil Rosen and starring Charles Delaney, June Marlowe and Gordon Griffith.

== Cast ==
- Charles Delaney as Fred 'Deacon' Colgate
- June Marlowe as Louise
- Gordon Griffith as Bruce
- George Riley as Billy
- Andy Clyde as Jenkins
- Erin La Bissoniere as Eleanor
- Lucy Beaumont as The Mother
- Henry Roquemore as Hippo

== Censorship ==
Before the film could be exhibited in Kansas, the Kansas Board of Review required the elimination of the silhouette hold-up scene, shortening the scene where a hot poker falls on a man's arm, and removal of the closeup of the injury.

== Bibliography ==
- Robert B. Connelly. The Silents: Silent Feature Films, 1910-36, Volume 40, Issue 2. December Press, 1998.
