= The Drunkard (1935 film) =

- Directed by: Albert Herman
- Written by: Al Martin; William H. Smith (play)
- Produced by: Bert Sternbach; Louis Weiss
- Starring: James Murray; Clara Kimball Young; Janet Chandler
- Cinematography: Edward Linden
- Edited by: Holbrook N. Todd
- Music by: Lee Zahler
- Production company: Weiss Productions
- Distributed by: Stage & Screen Productions
- Release date: April 3, 1935
- Running time: 63 minutes
- Country: United States
- Language: English

The Drunkard is a 1935 American drama film directed by Albert Herman and starring James Murray, Clara Kimball Young and Janet Chandler. It is based on the 1844 stage melodrama The Drunkard by William H. Smith.

== Cast ==
- James Murray as Edward Middleton
- Clara Kimball Young as Mrs. Karns
- Janet Chandler as Mary Wilson
- Bryant Washburn as Mr. Karns
- Theodore Lorch as Lawyer Squire Gribbs
- 'Snub' Pollard as Property Man
- Rosemary Theby as Mrs. Jackson
- Pat O'Malley as First Drunk
- Vera Steadman as Telephone Operator
- Gertrude Astor as Peggy
- Eric Mayne as Artie Rencelaw
- George Stuart as William Dowton
- Victor Potel as Farmer Gates
- Joseph De Grasse as Mr. Miller
- Jerome Storm as Second Drunk
- Ruth Hiatt as Secretary
- Shirley Jean Rickert as Julia
- Monte Carter as Mr. Rogers
- Vane Calvert as Widow Wilson
- Lafe McKee as Bartender
- Jack 'Tiny' Lipson as Farmer Stevens
- Joey Ray as Reggie
- Geri Foster as Agnes Dowton
- Bobby Nelson as Messenger Boy
- Helen Gibson as Betty
- John Elliott as Third Drunk

== Bibliography ==
- A. T. McKenna. Showman of the Screen: Joseph E. Levine and His Revolutions in Film Promotion. University Press of Kentucky, 2016.
