= Onslow Stevens =

American actor (1902–1977)

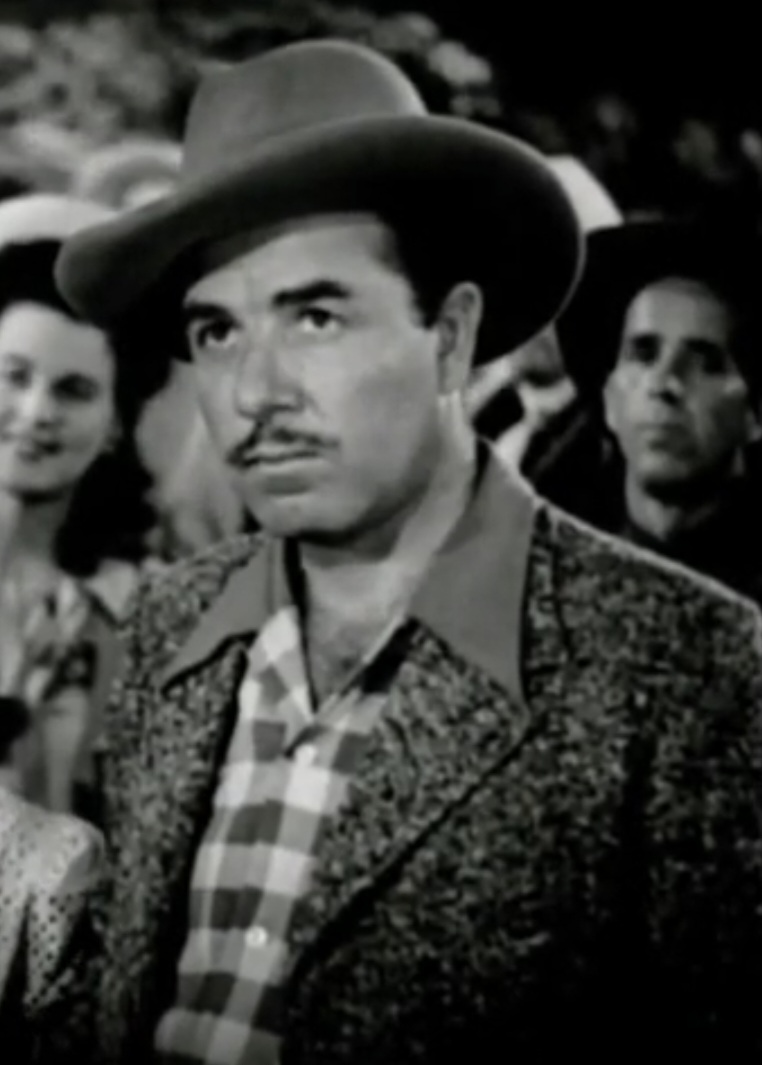
- Stevens in Hands Across the Border (1944)
- Born: Onslow Ford Stevenson; March 29, 1902; Los Angeles, California, U.S.
- Died: January 5, 1977 (aged 74); Van Nuys, Los Angeles, California, U.S.
- Resting place: Valhalla Memorial Park Cemetery
- Other name: Onslow Stevenson
- Occupation: Actor
- Years active: 1928–1962
- Spouses: Phyllis Cooper Stevens (m. 1934; div. 1935) Ann Buchanan (m. 1936, divorced) Vanessie Clark (m. 1944; div. 1946) Marley Shofner (m. 1959; div. 1960) Rose Heit (m. 1961)
- Parent: Houseley Stevenson

Onslow Stevens (born Onslow Ford Stevenson; March 29, 1902 – January 5, 1977) was an American stage, television and film actor.

== Early years ==
Stevens was born Onslow Ford Stevenson in Los Angeles, California, the son of British-born character actor Houseley Stevenson.

== Career ==
Stevens became involved in performing in 1926 at the Pasadena Community Playhouse, where his entire family worked as performers, directors and teachers. He left there in September 1930 to become the director of the Long Beach Players Guild in Long Beach, California.

His Broadway debut came in Stage Door (1936). He performed in over 80 films, at first as the lead actor, but mostly in character roles later in his career.

== Personal life and death ==
Stevens married Phyllis Cooper on August 26, 1934, in Yuma, Arizona. They separated in October 1934.

He spent the last years of his life in a nursing home in Van Nuys, Los Angeles, California, where, according to his wife, he was abused by his fellow residents and that his death was neither from natural causes nor an accident. He died of pneumonia after suffering a broken hip in 1977, at the age of 74. His interment was in an unmarked grave located at Valhalla Memorial Park Cemetery in North Hollywood, California.

== Recognition ==
For his contribution to the motion picture industry, Stevens has a star on the Hollywood Walk of Fame at 6349 Hollywood Boulevard.

== Filmography ==
Feature-length films of Onslow Stevens
Title	Year	Role	Notes	Ref(s)
The Gay Diplomat	1932	Lieutenant	Film debut, Uncredited	
Once in a Lifetime	1932	Lawrence Vail		
Radio Patrol	1932	Carl Hughes		
The Golden West	1932	Calvin Brown		
Born to Fight	1932	Clark Moran		
Okay, America!	1932	President	Off-screen credit	
Heroes of the West	1932	Tom Crosby		
Jungle Mystery	1932	Jack Morgan	Chapter 12: "Buried Treasure"	
Counsellor at Law	1933	John P. Tedesco		
Secret of the Blue Room	1933	Frank Faber		
Peg o' My Heart	1933	Sir Gerald "Jerry" Markham		
Nagana	1933	Dr. Roy Stark		
Only Yesterday	1933	Barnard, Party Guest		
Bombay Mail	1934	John Hawley		
This Side of Heaven	1934	Walter Hamilton		
The Crosby Case	1934	Francis Scott Graham		
I Like It That Way	1934	Harry Rogers		
I'll Tell the World	1934	Prince Michael		
The Vanishing Shadow	1934	Stanley Stanfield		
Affairs of a Gentleman	1934	Lyn Durland		
In Love with Life	1934	Prof. John Sylvestus Applegate		
I Can't Escape	1934	Steve Nichols aka Steve Cummings		
House of Danger	1934	Don Phillips		
A Notorious Gentleman	1935	John Barrett		
Born to Gamble	1935	Dan 'Ace' Cartwright; Henry Mathews		
The Three Musketeers	1935	Aramis		
Grand Exit	1935	John Grayson		
Forced Landing	1935	Farraday		
The Bridge of Sighs	1936	Jeffrey 'Jeff' Powell		
Yellow Dust	1936	Jack Hanway		
Three on the Trail	1936	Pecos Kane		
Under Two Flags	1936	Sidi-Ben Youssiff		
F-Man	1936	Mr. Shaw		
Easy Money	1936	Dan Adams		
Straight from the Shoulder	1936	Mr. Wendi		
Murder with Pictures	1936	Nate Girard		
You Can't Buy Luck	1937	Joe Baldwin		
Flight From Glory	1937	Ellis		
There Goes the Groom	1937	Dr. Becker		
Life Returns	1938	Dr. John Kendrick	Note: 1938 theatrical release, previously released in 1934-1935 for select showings only.	
When Tomorrow Comes	1939	Jim Holden		
Those High Grey Walls	1939	Dr. Frank Norton		
The Man Who Wouldn't Talk	1940	Frederick Keller		
Mystery Sea Raider	1940	Carl Cutler		
Who Killed Aunt Maggie?	1940	Bob Dunbar		
The Monster and the Girl	1941	J. Stanley McMasters	Alternative titles: The Avenging Brain; D.O.A.	
Go West, Young Lady	1941	Tom Hannegan		
Sunset Serenade	1942	Gregg Jackson		
Idaho	1943	State Ranger Bob Stevens		
Appointment in Berlin	1943	Rudolph Von Preissing		
Hands Across the Border	1944	Brock Danvers		
House of Dracula	1945	Dr. Franz Edlemann	Alternative title: The Wolf Man's Cure	
O.S.S.	1946	Field		
Canyon Passage	1946	Jack Lestrade		
Angel on My Shoulder	1946	Dr. Max Higgins		
The Creeper	1948	Dr. Jim Bordon		
Walk a Crooked Mile	1948	Igor Braun		
Night Has a Thousand Eyes	1948	Dr. Walters	Credited as Onslow Stevenson	
The Gallant Blade	1948	Gen. de la Garance		
Bomba, the Jungle Boy	1949	George Harland		
Red, Hot and Blue	1949	Captain Allen		
State Penitentiary	1950	Jim Evans		
Mark of the Gorilla	1950	Prof. Brandt		
Motor Patrol	1950	Lt. Dearborn		
Sirocco	1951	Emir Hassan		
Lorna Doone	1951	Counsellor Doone		
The Hills of Utah	1951	Jayda McQueen		
Sealed Cargo	1951	Cmdr. James McLean		
Revenue Agent	1951	Sam Bellows		
One Too Many	1951	Dr. Foster		
All That I Have	1951	Attorney Palmer		
Life of St. Paul	1951		Series of five short films	
The Family Secret	1951	Judge Geoffrey N. Williams		
The San Francisco Story	1952	Captain Jim Martin		
The Magnificent Adventure	1952			
The Charge at Feather River	1953	Grover Johnson		
A Lion Is in the Streets	1953	Guy Polli		
Fangs of the Wild	1954	Jim Summers		
They Rode West	1954	Col. Ethan Waters		
Them!	1954	Brig. Gen. Robert O'Brien		
New York Confidential	1955	Johnny Achilles		
Tribute to a Bad Man	1956	Hearn		
Outside the Law	1956	Chief Agent Alec Conrad		
The Ten Commandments	1956	Lugal		
Kelly and Me	1957	Walter Van Runkel		
Lonelyhearts	1958	Mr. Lassiter		
The Party Crashers	1958	Jim Nickerson		
Tarawa Beachhead	1958	General Nathan Keller		
The Buccaneer	1959	Phipps - Customs Inspector		
All the Fine Young Cannibals	1960	Joshua Davis		
The Couch	1962	Dr. W.L. Janz, M.D.		

== Television ==
Television
Year	Title	Role	Notes
1954	Waterfront	Capt. Bart Hubbard/Sam Borer	2 episodes
1955	Cheyenne	Judge Culver	1 episode
1958	The Adventures of Rin Tin Tin	Major Edward Karn	1 episode
1958–1960	Wagon Train	Jack Hanford/Francis Mason/Col. Daniel Morgan Benedict II/Cass Fleming	4 episodes:incl.'The Mark Hanford Story'
1959	Gunsmoke	Sheriff Ben Goddard	1 episode
1959	The Deputy	Tom Deaver	1 episode
1959	Bonanza	Flint Johnson	1 episode
1960	Overland Trail	President Ulysses S. Grant	1 episode
1960	Outlaws	John Kyle	1 episode
1960–1961	Texas John Slaughter	General Miles	Part of The Wonderful World of Disney
