= The Soul of Youth =

1920 film by William Desmond Taylor

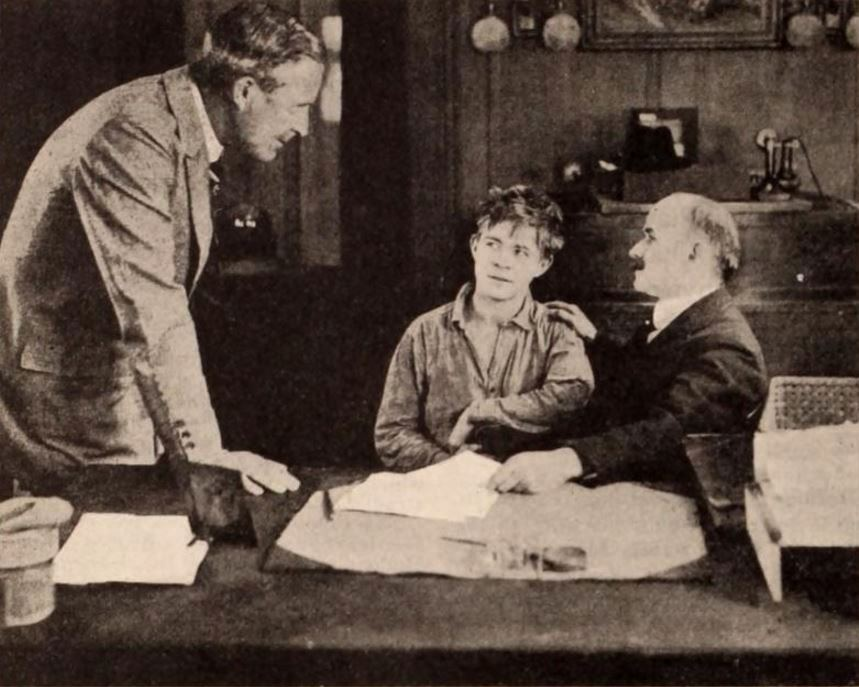
- Still with director William Desmond Taylor, Lewis Sargent, and jurist Benjamin Barr Lindsey
- Directed by: William Desmond Taylor
- Written by: Julia Crawford Ivers (story, scenario)
- Produced by: Realart Pictures
- Starring: Lewis Sargent; Lila Lee
- Cinematography: James Van Trees
- Distributed by: Realart Pictures Corporation (*Zukor's short lived affiliate of Famous Players–Lasky)
- Release date: August 15, 1920
- Running time: 6 reels
- Country: United States
- Language: Silent (English intertitles)

The Soul of Youth

The Soul of Youth is a 1920 American silent drama film directed by William Desmond Taylor, produced and distributed by Realart Pictures. Produced under the working title The Boy, it stars Lewis Sargent and Lila Lee.

The film has been preserved in the Library of Congress collection.

== Plot ==
As described in a film magazine, Ed Simpson, victim of prenatal influence and an unloved childhood, is introduced into the orphanage where his liveliness has made him the butt of taunting orphans and menacing officials. Love first comes into his life when he acquires a dog, and when it is ousted he follows, taking to the streets with his pal Mike. Through cunning the two boys obtain incriminating evidence that keeps a rascally politician from office. This paves the way for the clear supremacy of his rival, who gives Ed a home and adopts him. The getting of papers by the boys helps adjust a troubled love affair between Vera Hamilton and Dick Armstrong, two friends of the youth, and makes possible their marriage. When Ed after leaving the home steals to satisfy his hunger, he helps himself to canned goods on the shelves of the Hamiltons, who eventually become his foster parents.

== Cast ==
- Lewis Sargent as Ed Simpson
- Ernest Butterworth as Mike
- Clyde Fillmore as Mr. Hamilton
- Grace Morse as Mrs. Hamilton
- Lila Lee as Vera Hamilton
- Elizabeth Janes as Ruth Hamilton
- William Collier, Jr. as Dick Armstrong
- Claude Payton as Pete Moran
- Betty Schade as Maggie
- Fred Huntley as Mr. Hodge
- Sylvia Ashton as Mrs. Hodge
- Russ Powell as Patrolman Jones
- Judge Ben Lindsey as himself
- Mrs. Ben Lindsey as herself
- Jane Keckley as Matron
- Eunice Moore as Cook
- Barbara Gurney as Baby's Mother
