= Janet Chandler =

American actress

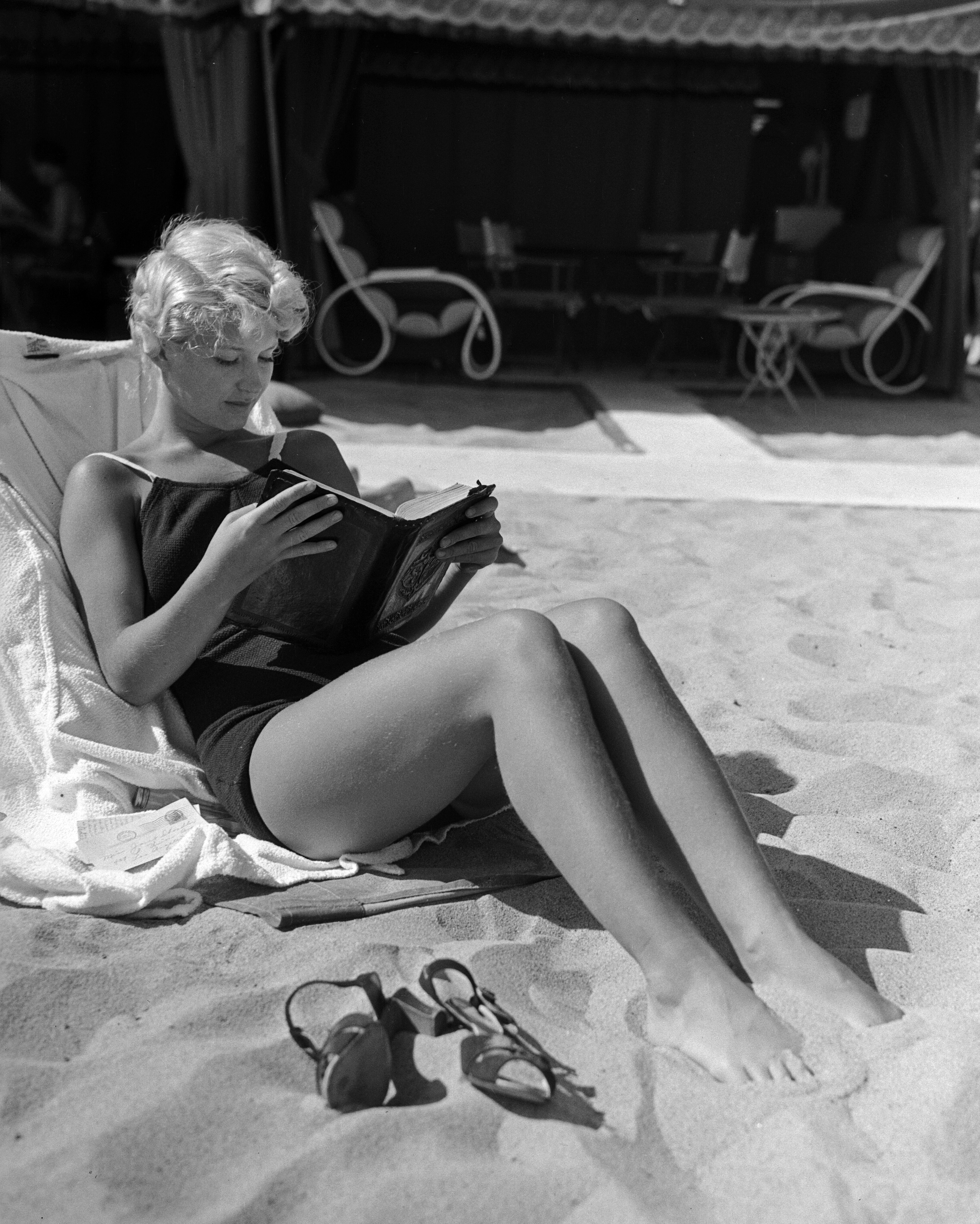
Chandler reading at the beach, 1935

Janet Chandler (December 31, 1911 – March 16, 1994) was a model and actress in American films. She had starring roles in several films of the 1930s. She began her film career as a child actress.

== Biography ==
Born Lillian Elizabeth Guenther in Pine Bluff, Arkansas to Albert John and Janet Elizabeth (Williams) Guenther, Chandler was a leading lady in the films The Golden West and Cowboy Holiday. After her family moved to Los Angeles, California, young Lillian attended girls schools (Harter, Orton). Chandler moved from New York to Hollywood in 1929 "to make the grade in pictures".

Chandler married twice and had three daughters. On October 21, 1935, she married George Edward Barrett, a New York investment broker. They divorced in 1947. She married, secondly, to playwright Joseph Kramm in 1956. That union also ended in divorce.

Chandler died at UCLA Medical Center in Los Angeles, California on March 19, 1994, aged 82, of heart failure and was interred in Bellwood Cemetery in her native Pine Bluff, Arkansas.

== Selected filmography ==
- The Three Musketeers (1921) (uncredited)
- Inez from Hollywood (1924) as Ruth Sullivan - Child (not billed)
- The Golden West (1932)
- House of Danger (1934) as Sylvia Evans
- Cowboy Holiday (1934) as Ruth Hopkins
- Cyclone of the Saddle (1935) as Sue
- The Drunkard (1935)
- Million Dollar Haul (1935)
- Rough Riding Ranger (1935) as Dorothy White
- Now or Never (1935) as Audrey Ferry
- Cyclone of the Saddle (1935) as Sue
- Show Girls
- The Drunkard (1935) as Mary Wilson
