= Outlaws of the Range =

1936 film

- Directed by: Albert Herman
- Written by: Zarah Tazil (story)
- Produced by: Ray Kirkwood (producer)
- Starring: See below
- Cinematography: William Hyer
- Edited by: Holbrook N. Todd
- Production company: Ray Kirkwood Productions
- Distributed by: Spectrum Pictures
- Release date: April 8, 1936
- Running time: 59 minutes
- Country: United States
- Language: English

Outlaws of the Range is a 1936 American Western film directed by Albert Herman. The film is also known as The Call of Justice in the United Kingdom. It stars Bill Cody and his young son, Bill Cody Jr.

== Plot ==
After rescuing Betty from a runaway horse, Steve is hired at her father's ranch. When rustlers go after Dad Wilson's cattle, Steve discovers their hideout and, in the ensuing fight, loses his gun. The crooks use Steve's gun to frame him for the murder of Dad Wilson. Steve goes on the run, intent on uncovering the killer, and the brains behind the rustling ring.

== Cast ==
- Bill Cody as Steve Harper
- Catherine Cotter as Betty Wilson
- William McCall as Dad Wilson
- Gordon Griffith as Grant
- Bill Cody Jr. as Jimmy Wilson
- Wally West as Deputy Tom
- Dick Strong as Mac - Bar X Foreman
