= Now or Never (1935 film) =

- Directed by: Bernard B. Ray
- Written by: C.C. Church
- Produced by: Bernard B. Ray; Harry S. Webb
- Starring: Richard Talmadge; Janet Chandler; Eddie Davis
- Cinematography: J. Henry Kruse
- Edited by: Fred Bain
- Production company: Reliable Pictures
- Distributed by: Reliable Pictures
- Release date: July 9, 1935
- Running time: 63 minutes
- Country: United States
- Language: English

Now or Never is a 1935 American crime film directed by Bernard B. Ray and starring Richard Talmadge, Janet Chandler and Eddie Davis.

== Cast ==
- Richard Talmadge as Dick Rainey / Norman Gray
- Janet Chandler as Audrey Ferry
- Eddie Davis as Riley
- Robert Walker as Mike McGowan - Henchman
- Otto Metzetti as Henchman Braun
- Tom Ricketts as Robert - the Butler
- Victor Metzetti as Cobb - Henchman

== Bibliography ==
- Balio, Tino. Grand Design: Hollywood as a Modern Business Enterprise, 1930–1939. University of California Press.
