= The Oregon Trail (1939 serial) =

1939 film directed by Ford Beebe

- DVD cover
- Directed by: Ford Beebe; Saul A. Goodkind
- Written by: George H. Plympton; Basil Dickey; Edmond Kelso; W.W. Watson
- Produced by: Henry MacRae
- Starring: Johnny Mack Brown; Louise Stanley; Fuzzy Knight; Bill Cody, Jr. Edward LeSaint; James Blaine; Charles Stevens; Jack C. Smith
- Cinematography: Jerome Ash; William A. Sickner
- Edited by: Joseph Gluck; Louis Sackin; Alvin Todd
- Distributed by: Universal Pictures
- Release date: July 4, 1939 (U.S.)
- Running time: 15 chapters (320 min)
- Country: United States
- Language: English

The Oregon Trail is a 1939 American Western film serial starring Johnny Mack Brown and released by Universal Pictures.

== Plot ==
Jeff Scott is sent to investigate problems with wagon trains attempting to make the journey to Oregon. Sam Morgan, the representative of an eastern syndicate, has full control of the fur trade. Morgan sends his henchmen, under lead-henchman Bull Bragg, to stop the latest wagon train in order to maintain control of the fur trade in the area.

== Cast ==
- Johnny Mack Brown as Jeff Scott, in the last of four serials Brown made for Universal.
- Louise Stanley as Margaret Mason
- Fuzzy Knight as Deadwood Hawkins, Scott's sidekick
- Bill Cody, Jr. as Jimmie Clark
- Edward LeSaint as John Mason
- James Blaine as Sam Morgan, villain
- Charles Stevens as "Breed"
- Jack C. Smith as Bull Bragg, Sam Morgan's main henchman
- Roy Barcroft as Colonel Custer
- Charles Murphy as Tompkins
- Colin Kenny as Slade, a henchman
- Forrest Taylor as Daggett, a henchman
- Jim Toney as Idaho Ike

== Production ==
=== Stunts ===
- Yakima Canutt (archive footage)
- Cliff Lyons
- Tom Steele

== Chapter titles ==
1. The Renegade's Revenge
2. The Flaming Forest
3. The Brink of Disaster
4. Thundering Doom
5. The Stampede
6. Indian Vengeance
7. Trail of Treachery
8. Redskin Revenge
9. The Avalanche of Doom
10. The Plunge of Peril
11. Trapped in the Flames
12. The Baited Trap
13. Crashing Timbers
14. Death in the Night
15. Trail's End

_{Source:}

| Preceded by Buck Rogers (1939) | Universal Serial; The Oregon Trail (1939) | Succeeded by The Phantom Creeps (1939) |
