= Lawless Border =

1935 film

- Directed by: John P. McCarthy
- Written by: Zarah Tazil
- Produced by: Ray Kirkwood
- Cinematography: Robert Cline
- Production company: Spectrum Pictures
- Distributed by: State Rights; Spectrum Pictures
- Release date: 1935
- Running time: 58 minutes
- Country: United States
- Language: English

Lawless Border is a 1935 Western film directed by John P. McCarthy and written by Zarah Tazil. It was released in 1935 in the US by State Rights and Spectrum Pictures.

== Plot ==
A U.S. government agent and Mexican agent infiltrate a gang of smugglers who traffic arms across the border to supply the Mexican revolutionary forces.

== Cast ==
- Bill Cody as the American agent
- Molly O'Day as the Smuggler's sister
- Martin Garralaga as the Mexican agent
- Ted Adams
- Joe de la Cruz
- John Elliott
- Merrill McCormick

== See also ==
- List of American films of 1935
