= House of Danger (film) =

1934 film

- Directed by: Charles Hutchison
- Written by: Jack Natteford; C.C. Cheddon
- Produced by: Sam Efrus
- Starring: Onslow Stevens; Janet Chandler; James Bush
- Cinematography: J. Henry Kruse
- Edited by: Fred Bain
- Production company: Peerless Pictures
- Distributed by: Peerless Pictures
- Release date: November 10, 1934
- Running time: 62 minutes
- Country: United States
- Language: English

House of Danger is a 1934 American mystery thriller film directed by Charles Hutchison and starring Onslow Stevens, Janet Chandler and James Bush. It was produced by the Poverty Row outfit Peerless Pictures.

== Plot ==
Don and his friend Ralph are travelling back from the South Sea islands when their ship catches fire and they have to jump overboard. Don then turns up the estate of Ralph's wealthy aunt, posing as his friend who has not been seen for some time. It becomes clear that Don is there to help protect Ralph's former fiancée Sylvia from her cousin who appears to have murderous intent.

== Cast ==
- Onslow Stevens as Don Phillips
- Janet Chandler as Sylvia Evans
- James Bush as Ralph Nelson
- Desmond Roberts as Gordon - The Butler
- Howard Lang as Mr. Weatherby
- Nina Guilbert as Aunt Lydia
- John Andrews as Martin
- Tove Linden as Helen

== Bibliography ==
- Fetrow, Alan G. . Sound films, 1927-1939: a United States Filmography. McFarland, 1992.
- Pitts, Michael R. Poverty Row Studios, 1929–1940: An Illustrated History of 55 Independent Film Companies, with a Filmography for Each. McFarland & Company, 2005.
