= Pollyanna (1920 film) =

1920 film by Paul Powell

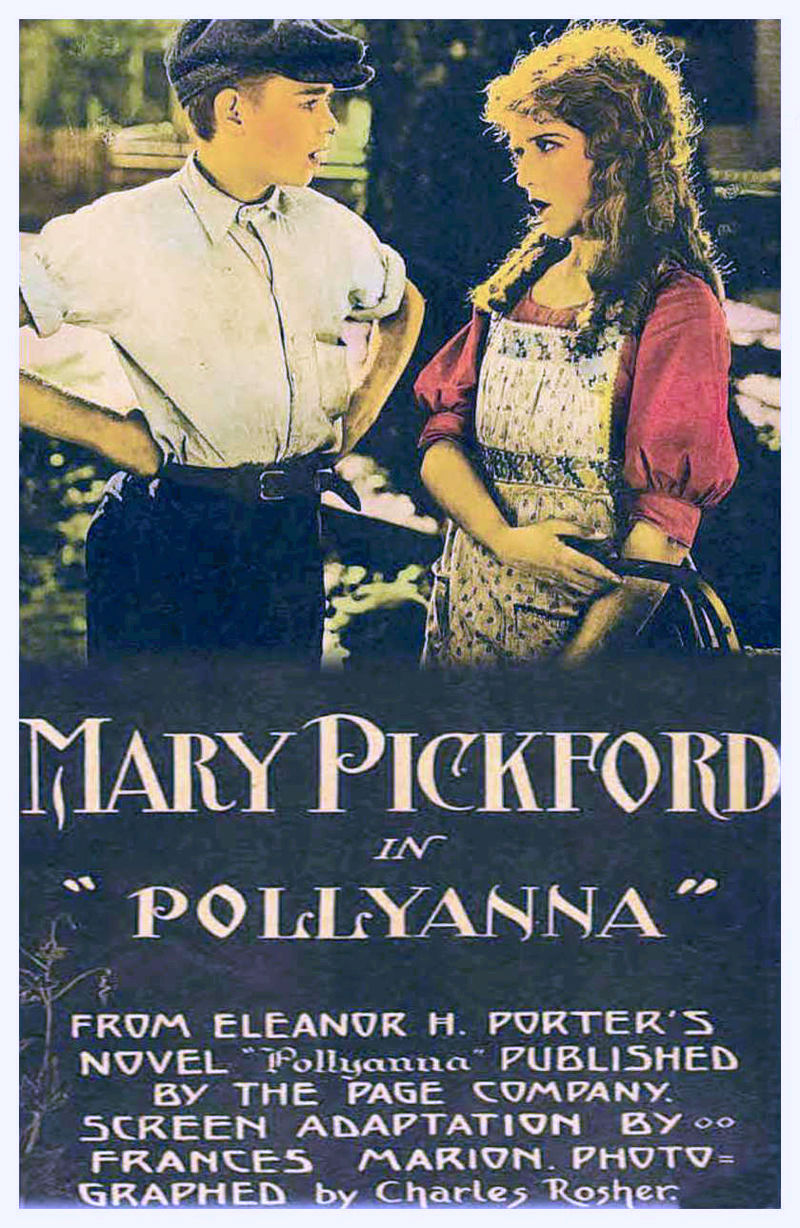
- Film poster
- Directed by: Paul Powell
- Written by: Frances Marion (adaptation)
- Based on: Pollyanna by Eleanor H. Porter
- Produced by: Mary Pickford; Paul Powell
- Starring: Mary Pickford
- Cinematography: Charles Rosher Sr.
- Distributed by: United Artists
- Release date: January 18, 1920
- Running time: 58 minutes
- Country: United States
- Languages: Silent film English intertitles
- Budget: $300,000
- Box office: $1,160,962

Pollyanna

Pollyanna is a 1920 American silent melodrama/comedy film starring Mary Pickford, directed by Paul Powell, and based on Eleanor H. Porter's 1913 novel of the same name. It was Pickford's first motion picture for United Artists. It became a major success and was regarded as one of Pickford's most defining pictures. The film grossed $1.1 million (approximately $17,679,000 today).

== Plot ==
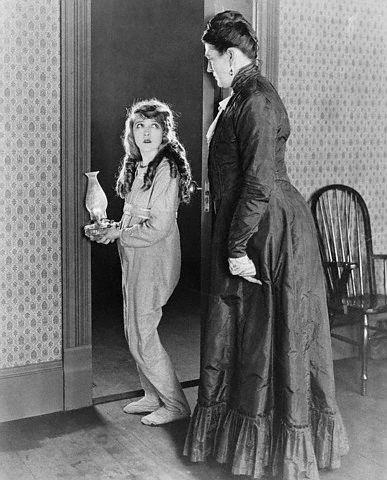
Scene from the film

The film opens in the Ozarks where a distraught Pollyanna (Mary Pickford) is comforting her father the Reverend John Whittier (Wharton James) as he dies. After his death, Pollyanna is sent to live on a New England plantation with her rich Aunt Polly (Katherine Griffith).

Aunt Polly is extremely harsh with Pollyanna by not allowing her to speak of her father in her house and choosing the attic for her bedroom. She even takes Pollyanna shopping for new clothes. One day, while playing on the plantation, Pollyanna gets in trouble with a servant woman and runs to hide in a haystack. There she meets Jimmy Bean (Howard Ralston), an orphan her age. Taking pity on him, Pollyanna is certain eventually Aunt Polly will let him live with them. So she hides him in the cellar. One day, Aunt Polly insists on going into the cellar, despite Pollyanna's pleas for fear Jimmy will be discovered. Jimmy is asleep and Pollyanna believes they're in the clear; until Jimmy starts shouting in his sleep, having a bad dream about turnips chasing and trying to eat him. Pollyanna is amused but Aunt Polly is not. After some pleading, Aunt Polly relents and tells Pollyanna to bring some good quilts for Jimmy.

One day, as Jimmy and Pollyanna play with the other children, they decide to try and steal some apples from a tree belonging to John Pendleton (William Cortleigh). John catches Pollyanna in the act, but forgives her, realizing she is the exact image of her mother, a woman he once loved deeply, but she loved Pollyanna's father instead. He tells Pollyanna this as he shows her a painting of her mother. Meanwhile, Jimmy fights his way in, fearing that Pollyanna is in danger. He tries to defend her but finds that everything is normal.

As Pollyanna settles in she seems to bring optimism to those she meets. She is insistent on playing a game her father taught her called "The Glad Game," where one counts the things they are glad for. She visits an old shut-in who is supposedly grateful for nothing. Pollyanna brings along an old blind and deaf friend who plays the accordion. Upon discovering the woman is blind and deaf, the shut-in proclaims her gratitude for still having her sight and hearing.

One day after a fight with Jimmy in which he "wishes she would die," Pollyanna heads into town. She notices a little girl playing in the middle of the road, oblivious to a car coming. Pollyanna leaps in front of the car, throwing the girl to safety, but in the process is hit herself. Jimmy and John both take her back to her Aunt's place. Aunt Polly becomes frantic and places her in her own lavish bedroom. Realizing the error of her ways, Aunt Polly declares how attached to Pollyanna she is; even giving her a kiss on the forehead, much to Pollyanna's delight.

Realizing they could have lost the little girl forever, many succumb to her wishes for them to be happy. John promises to adopt Jimmy the next day. Aunt Polly refuses to call Dr. Tom (Herbert Prior), who broke her heart years before. Pollyanna pleads to send for him but she refuses, bringing in another doctor. After several days, they discover Pollyanna is paralyzed from the waist down. Pollyanna becomes distraught; however, Jimmy comforts her, insisting she play the Glad Game.

Months pass and Pollyanna begins to use a wheelchair. One evening with Aunt Polly, she pleads one last time for her to send for Dr. Tom and Aunt Polly finally relents. With the help of Dr. Tom, Pollyanna is eventually able to walk again.

With the success of her walking comes the realization of her wishes. Aunt Polly reunites romantically with Dr. Tom and John adopts Jimmy. One day, she asks for Jimmy and he comes to wheel her around the garden. He gives Pollyanna a ring and promptly runs off out of fear, not realizing Pollyanna is able to walk. She is excited at the ring and happily runs after him.

== Cast ==
- Mary Pickford as Pollyanna Whittier
- Wharton James as Reverend John Whittier
- Katherine Griffith as Aunt Polly
- Helen Jerome Eddy as Nancy Thing
- George Berrell as Old Tom
- Howard Ralston as Jimmy Bean
- William Courtleigh as John Pendleton
- Herbert Prior as Dr. Tom Chilton

== Reception ==
Pollyanna was shot in and has a copyright year of 1919 but was first released in 1920. It had a budget of $300,000 and grossed $1.1 million worldwide during its first theatrical run. It was extremely popular, becoming the role that defined Pickford's "little girl" movies. Pickford was 27 years old at the time of filming and portrayed a 12-year-old.

== Status ==
A complete print of Pollyanna is preserved at the Mary Pickford Institute for Film Education (The Pickford Corporation also owns the copyright).

== Home media ==
Pollyanna was initially released on VHS in 1996. In 2007, it was released on DVD as part of a silent films collection titled The Golden Age of Silent Films, and later as part of the Mary Pickford Signature Collection in 2008. In 2010, Nostalgia Family Video also released the film on DVD.

On January 28, 2014, the film was also released on Region 0 DVD-R by Alpha Video.
