= A Scream in the Night =

1943 film by Fred C. Newmeyer

- Re-release poster
- Directed by: Fred C. Newmeyer
- Written by: Norman Springer (story and screenplay)
- Produced by: Ray Kirkwood (producer)
- Starring: Lon Chaney Jr. Sheila Terry; Philip Ahn; Zarah Tazil
- Cinematography: Bert Longenecker
- Edited by: Frederick Bain
- Distributed by: Astor Pictures (1943 release)
- Release date: 1943
- Running time: 58 minutes
- Country: United States
- Language: English

A Scream in the Night is an American film directed by Fred C. Newmeyer and starring Lon Chaney Jr. It is not related to the 1919 silent film of the same name. The film was made in 1934, but had trouble finding a distributor. It was only theatrically released in 1943, after Chaney had already become a star. Chaney played a dual role in the film, as both Detective Jack Wilson and Butch Curtain

== Plot ==
Jack Wilson, a colonial police detective (Chaney Jr.) in an Eastern seaport seeks a stolen gem, and infiltrates the underworld by posing as a drunken, look-alike wharfside bar owner named Butch Curtain.

== Cast ==
- Lon Chaney Jr. as both Detective Jack Wilson and Butch Curtain
- Sheila Terry as Edith Bentley
- Zarah Tazil as Mora
- Philip Ahn (credited as Philip Ann) as Wu Ting
- John Ince as Joe Bentley
- Manuel López as Johnny Fly
- Richard Cramer as Inspector Green
- Merrill McCormick as Jalla, the Money-Lender
- John Lester Johnson as John, the Bartender
