= Bill Cody Jr. =

American actor (1925–1989)

- Born: April 18, 1925; Los Angeles, California, U.S.
- Died: August 11, 1989 (aged 64); Los Angeles, California, U.S.
- Occupation: Actor
- Father: Bill Cody

Bill Cody Jr. (April 18, 1925 – August 11, 1989) was an American motion picture child actor.

== Early life ==
Born William Joseph Cody Jr. in Los Angeles, California, where his father Bill Cody was a cowboy star of B-movie westerns, the youngster was reportedly seven years old when he accompanied his father on a personal appearance tour throughout the United States. Bill Cody Jr. was nine years old when he began appearing in films, the first four of which were with his father.

== Ray Kirkwood Productions ==
Billed simply as "Billy Jr." for his first screen appearance, a featured role in Ray Kirkwood's first Bill Cody western, Frontier Days, released late in 1934 by Spectrum Pictures, the nine-year-old was cast as the younger brother of leading lady Ada Ince. As fresh Bart Wilson, whose father is murdered by despicable outlaws seeking control of the family ranch, Billy delivered a lively performance which prompted Kirkwood to include him in future Cody westerns. He was his father's virtual co-star in The Vanishing Riders, in which both Codys masquerade as ghost riders to demoralize a superstitious gang of rustlers led by Wally Wales. By the time he appeared in his father's final Spectrum release, Outlaws of the Range, such trade publications as Film Daily were commenting on his "fine, natural performance, which should win him a legion of fans".

Both Codys made personal appearances with a wild west show in 1935, after which Ray Kirkwood announced plans for a 1936–37 series of eight westerns costarring the father and son. In February 1936, production on the first film in the new series, The Reckless Buckarooo, was halted when an altercation between Kirkwood and his backer - Monarch Laboratories – reportedly resulted in the producer's being removed from the set and replaced by director Harry Fraser. By the first of March, Fraser had finished shooting the picture, but Kirkwood could not secure financing for the continuation of the series. An exceptionally likable western, The Reckless Buckaroo proved to be Bill Cody's final starring role and the last time the father and son worked together.

== Film work from 1937 to 1942 ==
In 1937, Cody was cast in an important featured role in a Monogram Tom Keene western, Romance of the Rockies, followed by a bit in the short subject, Our Gang Follies of 1938. A potentially major development was his signing to appear in MGM's Girl of the Golden West, portraying Nelson Eddy's role as a child in the opening sequences. The biographical information sheet filled out for young Cody upon his arrival at MGM in February, 1938, indicated that he was a junior high school student who enjoyed history, was an active Boy Scout, lived with his parents and brother in a California bungalow, enjoyed eating filet mignon, liked to swim and play baseball, had been interviewed on NBC, and had "made personal appearances with Daddy since 3 years old."

Cody's work in Girl of the Golden West did not lead to other roles at MGM. He was cast in a supporting role in a fast-paced Universal serial, The Oregon Trail, with Johnny Mack Brown and Fuzzy Knight, followed by two features with the same two cowboy actors, Desperate Trails and Badman From Red Butte. While at Universal, he was cast as "Skeets Scanlon" in the serial, Scouts to the Rescue, and he was seen in one sequence of the 1939 James Stewart-Marlene Dietrich favorite, Destry Rides Again. There was also a bit in Risky Business, with George Raft.

Cody was featured in Charles Starrett's Two-Fisted Rangers at Columbia, briefly appeared in another Universal serial, Sky Raiders and has been reported as being in the PRC western, Raiders of the West.

Cody joined the United States military in 1942, and served in World War II. He did not return to film work after the war. It is believed his wartime experiences profoundly affected him, and he never returned to acting.

He was profoundly depressed after the passing of his wife of forty years, and committed suicide in 1989. He was interred in the Forest Lawn - Hollywood Hills Cemetery in Los Angeles, California.
