= The Girl of the Golden West (1938 film) =

1938 film

- Directed by: Robert Z. Leonard
- Written by: Isabel Dawn; Boyce DeGaw
- Based on: The Girl of the Golden West; 1905 play by David Belasco
- Produced by: Robert Z. Leonard; William Anthony McGuire
- Starring: Jeanette MacDonald; Nelson Eddy; Walter Pidgeon
- Cinematography: Oliver T. Marsh
- Edited by: W. Donn Hayes
- Music by: Herbert Stothart
- Production company: Metro-Goldwyn-Mayer
- Distributed by: Loew's, Inc.
- Release date: March 16, 1938 (Los Angeles)
- Running time: 121 minutes
- Country: United States
- Language: English
- Budget: $1,680,000
- Box office: $1,597,000 (Domestic earnings) $1,285,000 (Foreign earnings)

The Girl of the Golden West is a 1938 American musical Western film adapted from the 1905 play of the same name by David Belasco, better known for providing the plot of the opera La fanciulla del West by Giacomo Puccini. A frontier woman falls in love with an outlaw.

== Plot ==
In a remote mining camp in California, a group of miners seek their fortune during the Gold Rush. The miners frequent a saloon run by Mary, who is known as the "Girl of the Golden West" and is beloved by the miners.

Notorious bandit and outlaw Dick Johnson arrives in town under the alias of Ramirez. He is on the run from the law, and when he takes refuge in Mary's saloon, he and Mary quickly fall in love. Mary, unaware of his true identity, shelters and protects him.

Sheriff Jack Rance, who is infatuated with Mary, becomes suspicious of the newcomer and starts investigating Dick's background. Rance discovers Dick's true identity and plans to capture him. Mary, torn between her love for Dick and her loyalty to the miners and her sense of justice, must make a difficult choice. When Jack shoots Dick , Mary hides him in the loft of her cabin. Blood dripping through the ceiling alerts Jack to Dick's presence. While Dick lies unconscious on the floor, Mary and Jack play cards to determine whether Dick will live or if Mary will stay with Jack. Mary wins by cheating, but Jack discovers it. He frees Dick and embraces a weeping Mary.

The boys throw a farewell party for Mary and Jack, who leave for Monterey to be married there. In Monterey, Mary hears Dick humming and orders him to flee. Jack overhears her confession of love and returns home. Dick and Mary are in a covered wagon singing “Señorita” and kissing.

== Cast ==
- Jeanette MacDonald as Mary Robbins
- Nelson Eddy as Ramirez
- Walter Pidgeon as Sheriff Jack Rance
- Leo Carrillo as Mosquito
- Buddy Ebsen as Alabama
- Leonard Penn as Pedro
- Priscilla Lawson as Nina Martinez
- Bob Murphy as Sonora Slim
- Olin Howland as Trinidad Joe
- Cliff Edwards as Minstrel Joe
- Billy Bevan as Nick
- Brandon Tynan as The Professor
- H.B. Warner as Father Sienna
- Monty Woolley as The Governor
- Charley Grapewin as Uncle Davy (in prologue)
- Noah Beery Sr. as The General – in prologue (as Noah Beery Sr.)
- Bill Cody Jr. as Gringo (young Ramirez; in prologue)
- Jeanne Ellis as Young Mary Robbins (in prologue)
- Ynez Seabury as Wowkle

== Soundtrack ==
- "Sun-Up to Sun Down": music by Sigmund Romberg, lyrics by Gus Kahn, sung by Jeanne Ellis and the pioneers in the prologue
- "Shadows on the Moon": music by Sigmund Romberg, lyrics by Gus Kahn, sung by Jeanne Ellis at a campfire in the prologue, reprised by Jeanette MacDonald, whistled and hummed by Nelson Eddy
- "Soldiers of Fortune": music by Sigmund Romberg, lyrics by Gus Kahn, sung by Noah Beery and his men and by Bill Cody Jr. (dubbed by Raymond Chace) in the prologue, reprised by Nelson Eddy and his men
- "The Wind in the Trees": music by Sigmund Romberg, lyrics by Gus Kahn, sung by Jeanette MacDonald, played on a fife by Buddy Ebsen
- "Gwine to Rune All Night"/"Camptown Races": written by Stephen Foster, played as background music in the saloon
- "Polly Wolly Doodle": lyrics by Gus Kahn, played on piano by Brandon Tynan, sung by Jeanette MacDonald
- "Ave Maria": music by Charles Gounod and Johann Sebastian Bach, played on an organ by H.B. Warner, sung by Jeanette MacDonald and chorus
- "Señorita": music by Sigmund Romberg, lyrics by Gus Kahn, sung by Nelson Eddy and party guests, reprised by Jeanette MacDonald and Nelson Eddy
- "Mariache": music by Sigmund Romberg, lyrics by Gus Kahn and Carlos Ruffino, translation for Spanish lyrics by Zacharias Yaconelli (uncredited), sung by Jeanette MacDonald, Nelson Eddy and chorus
- "The West Ain't Wild Anymore": music by Sigmund Romberg, lyrics by Gus Kahn, sung by Buddy Ebsen
- "Who Are We to Say": music by Sigmund Romberg, lyrics by Gus Kahn, sung by Nelson Eddy, hummed by Jeanette MacDonald, reprised on piano by Brandon Tynan and sung by Jeanette MacDonald
- "The Wedding March": from A Midsummer Night's Dream, Op.61 by Felix Mendelssohn, played on a banjo and hummed by Cliff Edwards

== Reception ==
The Los Angeles Times called the film "in most ways an ideal vehicle for its stars" but lamented that it "could stand a stronger finish" in comparison to the stage adaptation.

According to MGM records, the film earned $2,882,000, resulting in a profit of $243,000.
