= Lewis Sargent =

American actor

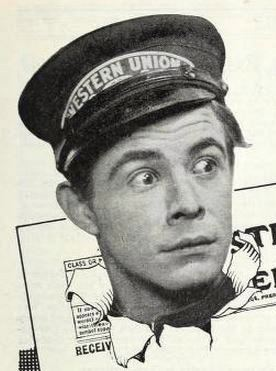
- Sargent in 1922 as Jimmy the Messenger Boy, his role in a series of comedy shorts
- Born: August 19, 1903; Los Angeles, California, U.S.
- Died: November 19, 1970 (aged 67); Los Angeles, California, U.S.
- Resting place: Valhalla Memorial Park Cemetery
- Occupation: Actor
- Years active: 1917–1949

Lewis Sargent (August 19, 1903 – November 19, 1970) was an American film actor. He appeared in 80 films between 1917 and 1949.

== Biography ==
Sargent was born in Los Angeles on August 19, 1903. He had 8 brothers and sisters. His father Lewis was a carpenter, and his older brother, Don Sargent, was a cinematographer in Hollywood for more than 40 years. He was an early friend of James Wong Howe. His ancestor William Sargent sailed to Agawam, Massachusetts, with Captain John Smith in 1614. Lewis W. Sargent was the third child of Lewis and Elsa Plath Sargent.

He was a child actor in the early days of motion pictures until 1935 when he portrayed Major Francis Martling's assistant George in The New Adventures of Tarzan, produced by its creator Edgar Rice Burroughs. This serial was shot in Guatemala. He played the title role in Huckleberry Finn in 1920, played supporting roles in Oliver Twist (1922), shared the lead with a dog in The Call of the Wilderness (1926) and several other films though 1929.

Sargent died November 19, 1970, while a patient at the Hollywood West Hospital.

== Selected filmography ==
- Aladdin and the Wonderful Lamp (1917)
- Ace High (1918)
- Ali Baba and the Forty Thieves (1918)
- The Coming of the Law (1919)
- Huckleberry Finn (1920) – as Huckleberry Finn
- The Soul of Youth (1920)
- Just Around the Corner (1921)
- Oliver Twist (1922)
- The Phantom Fortune (1923)
- The Wild Party (1923)
- Ridin' the Wind (1924)
- The Call of the Wilderness (1926)
- South of Panama (1928)
- A Million for Love (1928)
- One Splendid Hour (1929)
- The Clean Up (1929)
- The Man from New Mexico (1932)
- The New Adventures of Tarzan (1935)

== Bibliography ==
- John Holmstrom, The Moving Picture Boy: An International Encyclopaedia from 1895 to 1995, Norwich, Michael Russell, 1996, p. 21.
