= Rosa Turich =

American actress

- Born: Rosa Sinohui; June 9, 1903; Tucson, Arizona Territory, U.S.
- Died: November 20, 1998 (aged 95); Santa Ana, California, U.S.
- Resting place: San Fernando Mission Cemetery
- Other name: Rosa Sinohui
- Occupation: Actress
- Years active: 1932-1978 (film & TV)
- Spouse: Felipe Turich (1920-1992, his death)
- Children: 3

Rosa Turich (born Rosa Sinohui, June 9, 1903 – November 20, 1998) was an American film and television actress.

Turich was married to Felipe Turich, a comedian, with whom she did a comedy act in Los Angeles. They had three children.

On November 20, 1998, Turich died in Santa Ana, California, after having had two strokes.

== Filmography ==
| Year | Title | Role | Notes |
|---|---|---|---|
| 1932 | Beyond the Rockies | Housekeeper Lolita | Uncredited |
| 1936 | The Kid Ranger | Mexican Woman | Uncredited |
| 1937 | Zorro Rides Again | Tia - Cantina Maid | Serial, [Ch. 1], Uncredited |
| 1937 | Clipped Wings | Carla - McGuire Maid | |
| 1938 | Rose of the Rio Grande | Maria | |
| 1938 | Starlight Over Texas | Maria | |
| 1938 | Drifting Westward | Minor Role | Uncredited |
| 1939 | Man of Conquest | Mexican Woman | Uncredited |
| 1939 | Papa Soltero | Romualda | |
| 1939 | The Kansas Terrors | Heavyset Older Peon Woman | Uncredited |
| 1940 | Rhythm of the Rio Grande | Woman in Cantina | Uncredited |
| 1940 | Covered Wagon Days | Ortego's Cook | Uncredited |
| 1940 | Gaucho Serenade | Mexican Woman | Uncredited |
| 1940 | Rangers of Fortune | Caressa | |
| 1941 | Six Lessons from Madame La Zonga | Maid | Uncredited |
| 1941 | Prairie Pioneers | Ortego Cook | Uncredited |
| 1946 | South of Monterey | Lola - Maria's Cook | |
| 1947 | Riding the California Trail | The Cook | Uncredited |
| 1947 | Bowery Buckaroos | Ramona | |
| 1948 | Panhandle | Mexican Woman | Uncredited |
| 1948 | Old Los Angeles | Mercedes | Uncredited |
| 1948 | The Loves of Carmen | Bride's Mother | Uncredited |
| 1948 | Adventures of Frank and Jesse James | Rosita | Serial, [Chs. 1, 4–5, 7, 12], Uncredited |
| 1949 | Son of Billy the Kid | Rosa Gonzáles | |
| 1949 | Illegal Entry | Airport Café Proprietress | Uncredited |
| 1949 | Arctic Manhunt | Nakuchluk | Uncredited |
| 1950 | Dakota Lil | Fat Woman | Uncredited |
| 1950 | The Kid from Texas | Maria | |
| 1950 | Belle of Old Mexico | Rosita's Servant | Uncredited |
| 1950 | The Capture | Woman | Uncredited |
| 1950 | On the Isle of Samoa | Waini | |
| 1950 | Tripoli | Seewauk | |
| 1951 | Cuban Fireball | Maria | |
| 1951 | Havana Rose | Maria | |
| 1951 | Come Fill the Cup | Mexican Woman | Uncredited |
| 1951 | Man in the Saddle | Indian Servant | Uncredited |
| 1952 | The Miracle of Our Lady of Fatima | Townswoman | Uncredited |
| 1953 | The Hitch-Hiker | Woman | Uncredited |
| 1953 | Wings of the Hawk | Concha | Uncredited |
| 1953 | Gun Fury | Mexican Waitress | Uncredited |
| 1954 | Jubilee Trail | Señora Silva | Uncredited |
| 1954 | Jivaro | Native Bit | |
| 1954 | Phantom Stallion | Lucretia | |
| 1954 | Make Haste to Live | Juana | |
| 1954 | Passion | Maraquita | Uncredited |
| 1955 | All That Heaven Allows | Rosanne - Manuel's Wife | Uncredited |
| 1955 | Willy | Mrs. Pacheco | Episode: "Willy and El Flamenco" |
| 1957 | Teenage Doll | Squirrel's Mother | Uncredited |
| 1959 | Perry Mason | Filomena | S2 E29 "The Case of the Dubious Bride" |
| 1960 | Bat Masterson | Anita | Season 2, Ep 32 |
| 1962 | The Interns | Old Spanish Woman | Uncredited |
| 1963 | Move Over, Darling | Maria | Uncredited |
| 1966 | Jesse James Meets Frankenstein's Daughter | Nina Lopez | |
| 1967 | El Dorado | Rosa | Uncredited |

== Bibliography ==
- Pitts, Michael R. Western Movies: A Guide to 5,105 Feature Films. McFarland, 2012.
