= Pilar Del Rey =

American actress (1929–2025)

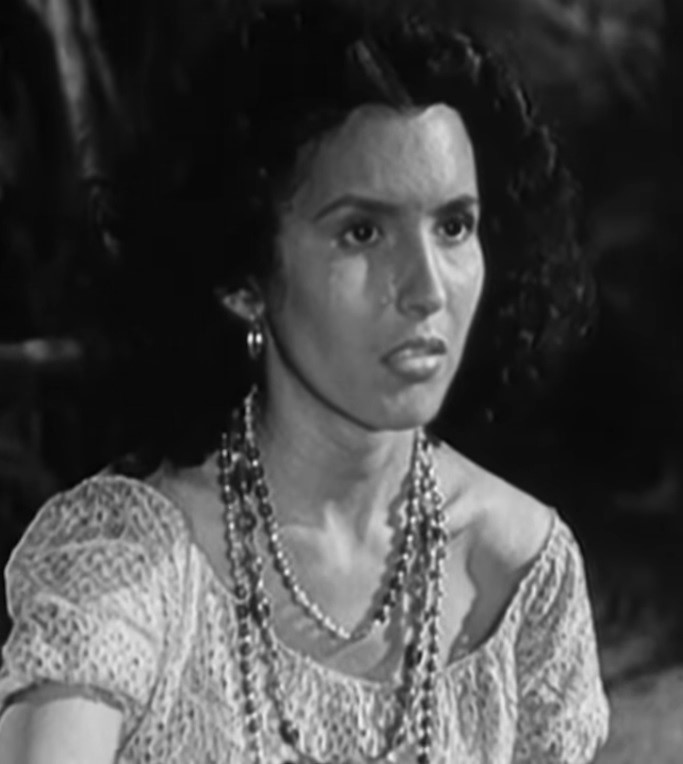
- In Stories of the Century in 1955
- Born: Pilar Bougas; May 26, 1929; Fort Worth, Texas, U.S.
- Died: February 23, 2025 (aged 95); Los Angeles, California, U.S.
- Occupation: Actress

Pilar Bouzas (May 26, 1929 – February 23, 2025), known professionally as Pilar Del Rey, was an American actress whose career spanned from the late 1940s until 1990. She was best known for portraying Mrs. Obregón in the 1956 epic film Giant.

== Background ==
Del Rey was born in Fort Worth, Texas, on May 26, 1929. She died in Los Angeles, California, on February 23, 2025, at the age of 95.

== Career ==
Pilar Del Rey appeared in several Westerns early in her career. Her first credited role was Marguarita in The Kid from Texas (1950). This was followed by Siege at Red River in 1954. In 1956 she appeared as Mrs. Obregón in Giant, alongside James Dean. She also appeared in the Western television series The Adventures of Kit Carson and the radio drama Maria Elena. A character actress, her credits include various Mexican and Spanish female characters.

== Filmography ==
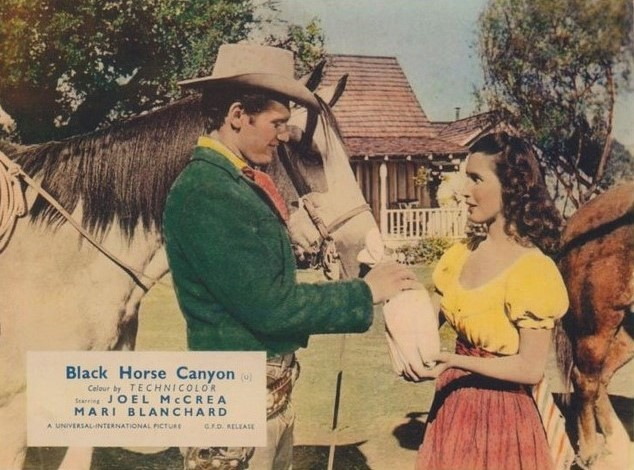
Del Rey (right), on the lobby card of Black Horse Canyon (1954), with Race Gentry.

Year	Work	Role	Ref
1950	The Kid from Texas	Marguarita	
1951	The Mark of the Renegade		
1952	The Miracle of Our Lady of Fatima	Young girl	
1953	Tropic Zone	Victoriana	
1953	And Now Miguel		
1954	Black Horse Canyon	Juanita	
1954	Jubilee Trail	Carmelita Velasco	
1954	The Naked Jungle	Indian wife	
1954	Siege at Red River		
1956	Giant	Mrs. Obregón	
1958	The Flame Barrier	Indian girl	
1966	And Now Miguel	Tomasita Chavez	
