= Saved by the Bell (disambiguation) =

Saved by the Bell is an American television sitcom that aired on NBC from 1989 to 1993.

Saved by the Bell may also refer to:

- Saved by the Bell (2020 TV series), a revival of the original series
- "Saved by the Bell" (song), a song by Robin Gibb

== See also ==
- Saved by the Belle
