= The Big Sombrero =

The Big Sombrero may refer to:

- Tampa Stadium, nicknamed "The Big Sombrero" due to its shape, a sports venue located in Tampa, Florida
- The Big Sombrero (film), a 1949 American film directed by Frank McDonald
