= Carmen Laroux =

Mexican actress (1909–1942)

- Publicity Photo of Carmen Laroux
- Born: September 4, 1909; Durango, Mexico
- Died: August 24, 1942 (aged 32); Los Angeles, California, US
- Years active: 1927–1941

Carmen Laroux (September 4, 1909 – August 24, 1942) was a Mexican film actress. Born in Durango, Mexico, she appeared in 19 films between 1927 and 1941. Laroux is best known for her appearance as Señorita Rita in the Three Stooges film Saved by the Belle (1939). She also appeared in the John Wayne film The Desert Trail (1935). Her final film appearance was as a maid in Orson Welles' masterpiece Citizen Kane. She committed suicide on August 24, 1942, from ingestion of ant poison.

== Filmography ==
Year	Title	Role	Notes
1927	Don Mike	Carmen	
1927	The Scarlet Brand	Rita Valdez	
1928	Sol de gloria		
1930	Las campanas de Capistrano		
1931	Cavalier of the West	Dolores Fernandez	
1931	Two-Gun Caballero	Rosita - Lopez's Sweetheart	
1932	The Boiling Point	Rosita	Uncredited
1932	Son of Oklahoma	Anita Verdugo	
1933	The California Trail	Juan's Wife	
1934	Rawhide Mail	Este's Saloon Friend	Uncredited
1934	A Demon for Trouble	Maya	
1934	Western Justice	Dolores Lopez	Uncredited
1935	The Desert Trail	Juanita	As Carmen LaRoux
1936	Ramona	Dancer	Uncredited
1936	Song of the Gringo	Fiesta Dancer	Uncredited
1936	The Old Corral	Rita Gonzales	Uncredited
1937	Cheyenne Rides Again	Pamela	
1937	Island Captives	Taino	
1937	Daughter of Shanghai	Dancer	Uncredited
1938	Starlight Over Texas	Rosita Ruiz	
1939	Saved by the Belle	Señorita Rita	Short
1941	Citizen Kane	Maid in Xanadu Hall	Uncredited, (final film role)
