= Rosa Rey =

Spanish actress

- Born: Isabel Mercedes Tárrago; September 4, 1892; Madrid, Spain
- Died: April 7, 1969 (aged 78); Los Angeles, California, USA
- Occupation: Actress
- Spouse: Martin Garralaga

Rosa Rey (born Isabel Mercedes Tárrago) was a Spanish actress and opera singer who worked in Hollywood from the 1930s through the 1960s.

== Biography ==
Rey was born in Madrid, Spain, as Isabel Tárrago; she was a descendant of notable lawyer and poet Torcuato Tárrago y Mateos. Rey worked as an opera singer before making her way onto the silver screen as a character actress. She was married to actor Martin Garralaga; they both worked at Fox in the 1930s. She died on April 7, 1969, in Los Angeles County, California.

== Selected filmography ==
- La buenaventura (1934)
- Grand Canary (1934)
- Tripping Through the Tropics (1934)
- Tres Amores (1934)
- El cantante de Napoles (1935)
- Julieta Buys a Son (1935)
- Rosa de Francia (1935)
- El crimen de media noche (1936)
- El capitan Tormenta (1936)
- Song of the Gringo (1936)
- Fiesta (1941)
- The Face of Marble (1946)
- Gilda (1946)
- Two Years Before the Mast (1946)
- Secret Beyond the Door... (1947)
- Secret of the Incas (1954)
- The Rose Tattoo (1955)
- The Bottom of the Bottle (1956)
- Lawman (1959 episode "The Outsider") as Mrs. Lebeau
