= Strange Voyage =

1946 American film directed by Irving Allen

- Directed by: Irving Allen
- Written by: Edward Anhalt and Edna Anhalt as "Andrew Holt"
- Produced by: Louis B. Appleton Jr.
- Starring: Eddie Albert; Forrest Taylor; Elena Verdugo
- Cinematography: Jack Greenhalgh
- Production company: Signal Pictures
- Distributed by: Monogram Pictures
- Release date: 1946
- Running time: 67 minutes
- Country: United States
- Language: English

Strange Voyage is a 1946 American adventure film directed by Irving Allen and starring Eddie Albert, Forrest Taylor and Elena Verdugo.

== Plot ==
A man goes looking for treasure.

== Cast ==
- Eddie Albert as Chris Thompson
- Forrest Taylor as Skipper
- Ray Teal as Captain Andrews
- Matt Willis as Hammer
- Martin Garralaga as Manuel
- Elena Verdugo as Carmelita Lopez
- Bobby Cooper as Jimmy Trask
- Clyde Fillmore as Sportsman
- Daniel Kerry as Ben
- Henry Orosco as Father
- Junior, the monkey

== Production ==
It was the first produced script by Edward and Edna Anhalt who had been writing and selling stories to movies as "Andrew Holt".
