= Party Wire =

1935 film by Erle C. Kenton

- Directed by: Erle C. Kenton
- Written by: Ethel Hill; John Howard Lawson
- Based on: the novel Party Wire by Bruce Manning
- Starring: Jean Arthur; Victor Jory
- Cinematography: Allen G. Siegler
- Edited by: Viola Lawrence
- Production company: Columbia Pictures
- Distributed by: Columbia Pictures
- Release date: April 27, 1935
- Running time: 69 minutes
- Country: United States
- Language: English

Party Wire is a 1935 drama film starring Jean Arthur and Victor Jory. It was based on the novel of the same name by Bruce Manning. In a small town, an overheard conversation on a telephone party line results in gossip that causes a great deal of trouble for a young woman and a wealthy man.

== Plot ==
Matthew Putnam is summoned back to his small hometown of Rockridge by his aged, bedridden aunt Nettie after seven years of enjoying himself in Europe, where he had been sent to study. She is tired and wants him to take charge of Putnam Dairies, the family business and the town's major employer. Every mother with a marriageable daughter is excited by the return of the wealthy young man, including Mathilda Sherman. However, Matthew shows no interest in Mathilda's daughter Irene.

When Matthew visits his good friend Will Oliver, he is pleasantly surprised to see how grown up and beautiful Will's daughter Marge has become. His reluctance to remain in town evaporates as he spends more and more time with her – flirting with her at the bank where she works.

This does not sit well with Roy Daniels. When Roy makes his bid for her affections, she turns him down, so he decides to leave for New York City the next day. Marge is up late at night trying to balance the church's finances, for which she and Roy are responsible. Finally, an irate Will calls over the shared telephone line (a "party line") and leaves an angry message for Roy to come over to straighten out the mess before he leaves town. However, telephone eavesdroppers misinterpret the message and assume that Roy has gotten Marge pregnant and is trying to leave town without marrying her.

Mathilda is delighted at the ostensible scandal and bullies her husband Tom, the president of the Sherman Bank, into firing Marge. She also disqualifies Marge's winning entry in the prestigious annual flower show. Marge and Matthew are oblivious to the rumors. He asks her to marry him; she accepts, provided they elope the next day. When Matthew is late for their elopement, Marge assumes he believes the stories. Will, having discovered it was his call that started the whole mess, shoots himself, but botches his suicide and survives with only a minor head wound.

Marge and Mathew separately find out about the ugly stories being circulated about Marge. Matthew decides to teach the town a sharp lesson. He first transfers all his money out of the Sherman Bank, which would lead to its collapse, and orders the replacement of all 300 local workers with out-of-towners. Faced with the destruction of their community, the workers organize a meeting that Matthew attends in the new town hall. Before things get totally out of hand, Matthew's aunt Nettie – who hadn't left bed the last fifteen years – shows up and gives the townsfolk a tongue-lashing for their malicious gossip by bringing up their own past misdeeds.

Everything is eventually straightened out and the couple sneak off to the nearby town Springfield to get married. However, the chastened townspeople have not changed their ways. A mock disagreement between the newlyweds about where they should spend their honeymoon is seen and misreported as a full-blown argument by Bert West.

== Cast ==
- Jean Arthur as Marge Oliver
- Victor Jory as Matthew Putnam
- Helen Lowell as Nettie Putnam
- Robert Allen as Roy Daniels
- Charley Grapewin as Will Oliver
- Clara Blandick as Mathilda Sherman
- Geneva Mitchell as Irene Sherman
- Maude Eburne as Clara West
- Matt McHugh as Bert West
- Oscar Apfel as Tom Sherman
- Robert Middlemass as Judge Steven Stephenson
- Walter Brennan as Paul, Telegraph Operator (uncredited)
- Louise Carter as Grandma Kern (uncredited)
