= Two-Gun Caballero =

1931 film

- Directed by: Jack Nelson
- Written by: Wayne Lamont; Jack Nelson
- Produced by: William M. Pizor
- Starring: Robert Frazer; Consuelo Dawn; Carmen Laroux
- Cinematography: Bert Baldridge
- Production company: Cardinal Productions
- Distributed by: Imperial Distributing Corporation
- Release date: December 15, 1931
- Running time: 58 minutes
- Country: United States
- Language: English

Two-Gun Caballero is a 1931 American Western film directed by Jack Nelson and starring Robert Frazer, Consuelo Dawn and Carmen Laroux.

== Cast ==
- Robert Frazer as Bob Blake - posing as Lopez
- Consuelo Dawn as Sally Thompson
- Carmen Laroux as Rosita - Lopez's Sweetheart
- Bobby Nelson as Jimmy Thompson
- Jack Perrin as Sheriff
- Pat Harmon as Butch Devlin
- Diane Esmonds as Mrs. Steele
- Al Ferguson as Burke

== Bibliography ==
- Michael R. Pitts. Poverty Row Studios, 1929–1940: An Illustrated History of 55 Independent Film Companies, with a Filmography for Each. McFarland & Company, 2005.
