= The Desert Trail =

1935 film

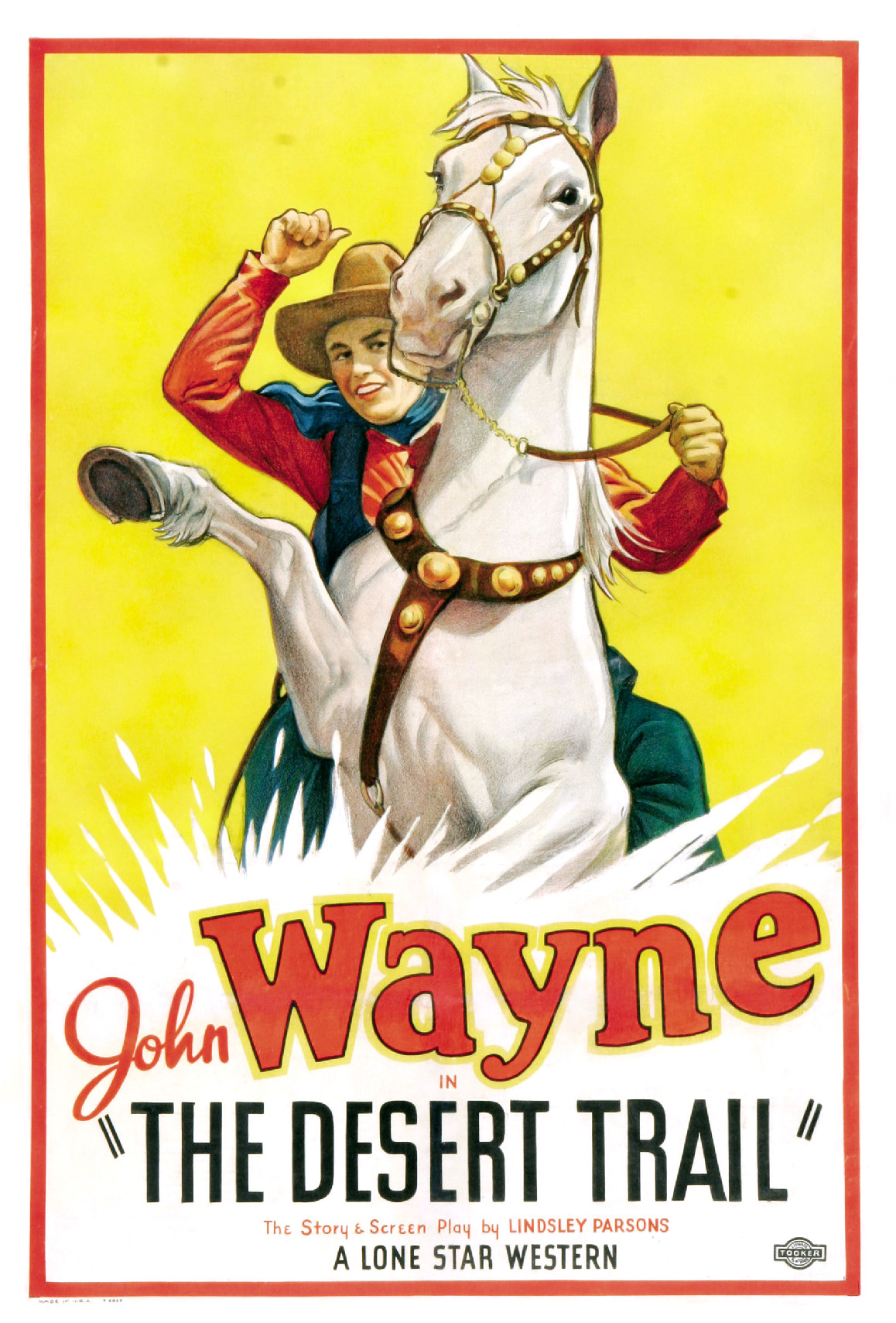
- Original theatrical poster
- Directed by: Lewis D. Collins
- Written by: Lindsley Parsons
- Produced by: Paul Malvern
- Starring: John Wayne; Lafe McKee; Al Ferguson; Henry Hall
- Cinematography: Archie Stout
- Edited by: Carl Pierson
- Distributed by: Monogram Pictures Corporation
- Release date: April 22, 1935
- Running time: 54 minutes
- Language: English
- Box office: $27,500

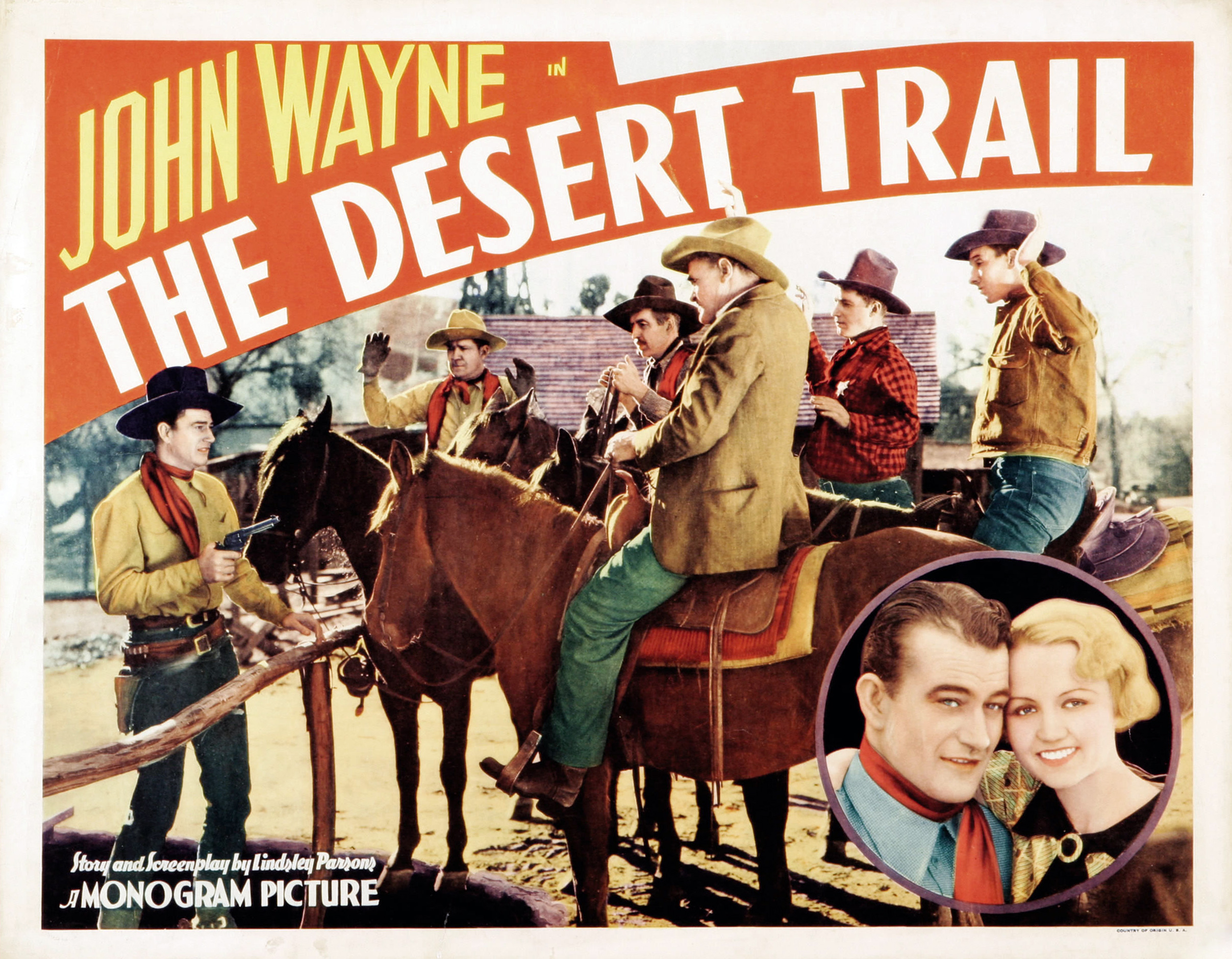
Lobby card

The Desert Trail is a 1935 American Monogram Western film starring John Wayne and directed by Lewis D. Collins (credited as Cullin Lewis). The movie also features Eddy Chandler, Mary Kornman, and Paul Fix.

== Plot ==
Rodeo star John Scott and his gambler friend Kansas Charlie are wrongly accused of armed robbery at the Rattlesnake Gulch rodeo (with an admission price of $1) just after John Scott gets his rodeo prize money. The Rodeo Official is robbed and murdered by Pete and Jim a minute after Scott and Kansas Charlie leave. Pete tells authorities he just saw John and his friend Kansas Charlie leaving the office. Now fugitives, John and Charlie flee to another town where they assume new names. There they compete for the affections of a woman who runs a store, Jim's sister Anne Whitaker. Later, John and Charlie interrupt a stagecoach holdup by Pete and Jim. But after John brings the stagecoach and its passengers back to town, Pete shows up and fingers them for the crime. John and Charlie find themselves in jail. Jim, knowing they are innocent and feeling guilty for his part in the crimes, helps bust them out. John and Charlie head after Pete to try to get a confession, with a posse riding hard behind them.

== Cast ==
- John Wayne as John Scott, aka John Jones
- Mary Kornman as Anne Whitaker
- Paul Fix as Jim Whitmonlee
- Eddy Chandler as Kansas Charlie, aka Rev. Harry Smith
- Carmen Laroux as Juanita LaRoux (as Carmen LaRoux)
- Lafe McKee as Poker City Sheriff Lee Brown
- Al Ferguson as Pete, the drifter
- Henry Hall as Farnsworth (Rodeo Promoter)

== See also ==
- John Wayne filmography
- List of American films of 1935
