= Martin Garralaga =

Spanish actor (1894–1981)

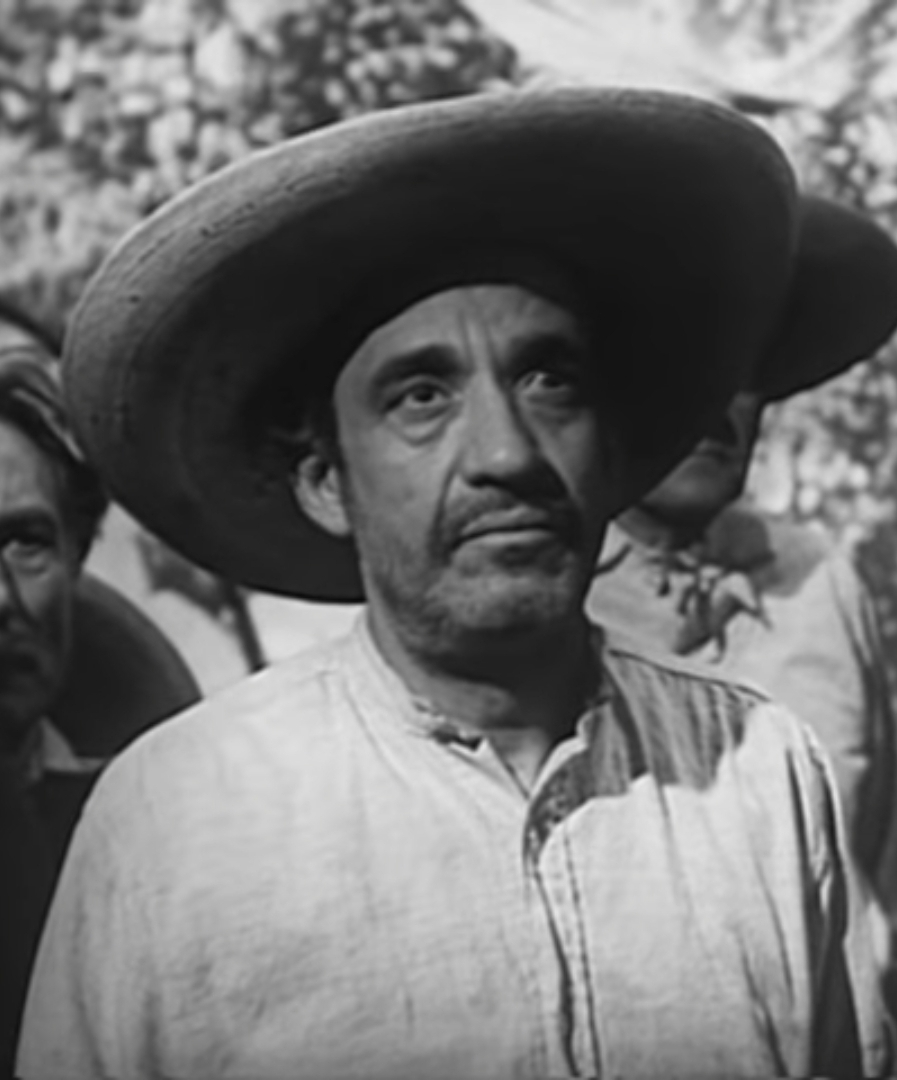
- Garralaga in The Fighter (1952)
- Born: 10 November 1894; Barcelona, Spain
- Died: 12 June 1981 (aged 86); Woodland Hills, Los Angeles, California, U.S.
- Occupation: Actor
- Years active: 1930–1969
- Spouse: Rosa Rey

Martín Garralaga (10 November 1894 – 12 June 1981) was a Spanish actor who worked in Hollywood from the 1930s through the 1960s. He was married to opera singer and actress Rosa Rey.

== Biography ==
Garralaga first came to the United States when he sailed from Santo Domingo, Dominican Republic, to San Juan, Puerto Rico, on the steamship Catherine in April 1924. He acted in more than two hundred roles in film and television and is probably best known for his portrayal of "Pancho" in the early Cisco Kid films.

In 1958, Garralaga was cast as Ramirez in the episode "A Tree for Planting" of the CBS western television series, The Texan. Lurene Tuttle and Paul Fix were cast in the episode as Amy Bofert and Bert Gorman, respectively. In the storyline, series character Bill Longley (Rory Calhoun) comes to the aid of a distressed Mexican farmer, Ramirez, whose peach orchards are being overrun by cattle ranchers.

Garralaga appeared as Father Mariano, a mission priest, in the 1954 episode "The Saint's Portrait" of the syndicated anthology series Death Valley Days, hosted by Stanley Andrews. In the story line, a painting of Saint Joseph is thought by a tribe and its covetous neighbor to be magical. However, Father Mariano reveals its deeper meaning. The episode also starred Rico Alaniz, George J. Lewis, Eugenia Paul, and Chief Thundercloud.

In 1955, he appeared as Mr. Delgado on the TV Western Cheyenne in the episode "Border Showdown."

== Death ==
Garralaga died at the age of 86 in Woodland Hills, a part of Los Angeles.

== Serial filmography ==
- Charros, gauchos y manolas (1930) - Spanish artist
- King of Jazz (1930) - Emcee - Spanish Version
- El hombre malo (1930) - Bradley
- El precio de un beso (1930)
- El último de los Vargas (1930) - Erche
- Mr. Wu (1930) - Mr. Holman
- Sevilla de mis amores (1930) - Enrique Varga
- Los que danzan (1930) - Pat Hogan
- De frente, marchen (1930) - El capitán Scott
- La llama sagrada (1931) - Mauricio Taylor
- La gran jornada (1931) - Martin
- La dama atrevida (1931) - Carlos Townsend
- Cuerpo y alma (1931) - Young
- There Were Thirteen (1931) - John Ross
- The Gay Caballero (1932) - Manuel
- Marido y mujer (1932)
- El rey de los gitanos (1933) - Gregor
- Dos noches (1933) - Pedro Hernádez
- No dejes la puerta abierta (1933) - Entrenador
- Yo, tú y ella (1933) - Minor Role (uncredited)
- La cruz y la espada (1934) - Jaime
- Un capitan de Cosacos (1934) - Ordenanza
- The Singer of Naples (1935) - Beppo
- George White's 1935 Scandals (1935) - Spaniard (uncredited)
- In Caliente (1935) - Waiter (uncredited)
- Under the Pampas Moon (1935) - Court Clerk (uncredited)
- Angelina o el honor de un brigadier (1935) - Pedro
- Piernas de seda (1935) - Evans
- Rosa de Francia (1935) - El marqués de Grimaldo
- Te quiero con locura (1935) - Director
- The Law of 45's (1935) - Joe Sanchez
- De la sartén al fuego (1935) - Subteniente Cartellini
- Lawless Border (1935) - Sanchez
- A Message to Garcia (1936) - Rodríguez
- The Border Patrolman (1936) - Carlos - Cantina Proprietor (uncredited)
- Anthony Adverse (1936) - Arab (uncredited)
- The Charge of the Light Brigade (1936) - Panjari (uncredited)
- Song of the Gringo (1936) - Don Esteban Valle
- Smoke Tree Range (1937) - Pio (uncredited)
- Another Dawn (1937) - Ali - Roark's Servant (uncredited)
- Riders of the Rockies (1937) - Rurale Captain Mendoza
- Boots of Destiny (1937) - Jose Vasco
- Love Under Fire (1937) - Luis (uncredited)
- The Sheik Steps Out (1937) - Hotel Clerk (uncredited)
- The Mysterious Pilot (1937, Serial) - Babette's Dance Partner (uncredited)
- Rose of the Rio Grande (1938) - Luis
- Four Men and a Prayer (1938) - Native (uncredited)
- Air Devils (1938) - Conspirator (uncredited)
- Outlaw Express (1938) - Don Ricardo Hernandez
- Mis dos amores (1938) - Alfonso Hernandez
- Starlight Over Texas (1938) - Captain Gomez
- The Law West of Tombstone (1938) - Chuy - Joey's Father (uncredited)
- El trovador de la radio (1938) - Store Manager
- Di que me quieres (1939) - Desparrat
- Juarez (1939) - Negroni
- Forged Passport (1939) - Scott's Mexican Waiter (uncredited)
- Bachelor Father (1939) - Pérez
- Panama Lady (1939) - Panama Policeman (uncredited)
- Code of the Secret Service (1939) - Mexican Soldier Playing Strip Poker (uncredited)
- The Girl from Mexico (1939) - Carmelita's Relative (uncredited)
- Overland with Kit Carson (1939, Serial) - Col. Martino (Ch. 3) (uncredited)
- Mutiny on the Blackhawk (1939) - (uncredited)
- The Fighting Gringo (1939) - Pedro
- Law of the Pampas (1939) - Bolo-Carrier (uncredited)
- Another Thin Man (1939) - Pedro - the Informant (uncredited)
- The Mad Empress (1939) - General Miramar (uncredited)
- El rancho del pinar (1939) - Adobe
- Legion of the Lawless (1940) - Blacksmith Manuel (uncredited)
- Rhythm of the Rio Grande (1940) - Pablo - Bandit
- Stage to Chino (1940) - Pedro
- Rangers of Fortune (1940) - Mexican Officer (uncredited)
- Wagon Train (1940) - Buyer of Beans (uncredited)
- Meet the Wildcat (1940) - Policeman (uncredited)
- Doomed Caravan (1941) - Padre (uncredited)
- The Son of Davy Crockett (1941) - Mexican Leader (uncredited)
- Our Wife (1941) - Cuban Driver (uncredited)
- Law of the Tropics (1941) - Pedro - Bookkeeper (uncredited)
- International Lady (1941) - Lisbon Cab Driver (uncredited)
- The Night of January 16th (1941) - Cuban Policeman (uncredited)
- The Lady Has Plans (1942) - Maitre D' (uncredited)
- Spy Smasher (1942, Serial) - Commandant [Ch. 2] (uncredited)
- Ship Ahoy (1942) - Hotel Clerk (uncredited)
- In Old California (1942) - Señor Alvarez (uncredited)
- Undercover Man (1942) - Cortez (uncredited)
- Casablanca (1942) - Headwaiter at Rick's (uncredited)
- The Outlaw (1943) - Mike - Waiter (uncredited)
- For Whom the Bell Tolls (1943) - Captain Mora
- Adventure in Iraq (1943) - High Priest
- How to Operate Behind Enemy Lines (1943) - Enemy Agent Y (uncredited)
- The Purple Heart (1944) - Manuel Siva (uncredited)
- Voice in the Wind (1944) - Policeman
- The Laramie Trail (1944) - Don Louis Alarcon
- Tampico (1944) - Able Seaman Serra (uncredited)
- Going My Way (1944) - Zuñiga (uncredited)
- Man from Frisco (1944) - Mexican (uncredited)
- The Hairy Ape (1944) - Spanish Official at Dock (uncredited)
- The Conspirators (1944) - Detective Outside Pawnshop (uncredited)
- Black Arrow (1944, Serial) - Pancho
- The Cisco Kid Returns (1945) - Pancho Gonzales
- In Old New Mexico (1945) - Pancho Gonzales
- West of the Pecos (1945) - Don Manuel
- South of the Rio Grande (1945) - Pancho
- Voice of the Whistler (1945) - Tony, Fruit Peddler (uncredited)
- Mexicana (1945) - Policeman
- Yolanda and the Thief (1945) - Police Official on Train (uncredited)
- Masquerade in Mexico (1945) - Jose (uncredited)
- The Sailor Takes a Wife (1945) - Brazilian Officer (uncredited)
- Adventure (1945) - Nick - Bartender (uncredited)
- Perilous Holiday (1946) - Manuel Perez (uncredited)
- The Gay Cavalier (1946) - Don Felipe Geralda
- Mysterious Intruder (1946) - Detective (uncredited)
- The Virginian (1946) - Spanish Ed (uncredited)
- South of Monterey (1946) - Commandante Auturo Morales
- Strange Voyage (1946) - Manuel
- Personality Kid (1946) - Melendez (uncredited)
- Monsieur Beaucaire (1946) - Spanish Servant (uncredited)
- The Thrill of Brazil (1946) - Alberto - the Waiter (uncredited)
- Don Ricardo Returns (1946) - Miguel Porcoreno
- Beauty and the Bandit (1946) - Dr. Juan Valegra
- Plainsman and the Lady (1946) - Alvarades (uncredited)
- The Chase (1946) - Havana Cabman (uncredited)
- Riding the California Trail (1947) - Don José Ramirez
- California (1947) - Mexican Sheepherder (uncredited)
- Apache Rose (1947) - Cafe Host Who Arrives with Rosa (uncredited)
- Carnival in Costa Rica (1947) - Cabbie (uncredited)
- Twilight on the Rio Grande (1947) - Mucho Pesos
- Honeymoon (1947) - Official (uncredited)
- Jungle Flight (1947) - Hotel Desk Clerk (uncredited)
- Framed (1947) - Cafe Janitor (uncredited)
- Gunfighters (1947) - Padre (uncredited)
- Ride the Pink Horse (1947) - Bartender
- The Lost Moment (1947) - Waiter (uncredited)
- The Senator Was Indiscreet (1947) - Italian Waiter (uncredited)
- Tycoon (1947) - Chávez
- The Treasure of the Sierra Madre (1948) - Railroad Conductor (uncredited)
- Madonna of the Desert (1948) - Papa Baravelli
- Port Said (1948) - Hotel Porter
- Up in Central Park (1948) - Bertolli (uncredited)
- Four Faces West (1948) - Florencio
- Rogues' Regiment (1948) - Hazaret
- The Saxon Charm (1948) - Manager (uncredited)
- Shep Comes Home (1948) - Manuel Ortiz
- The Feathered Serpent (1948) - Pedro Francisco Lopez
- The Big Sombrero (1949) - Felipe Gonzales
- The Bribe (1949) - Pablo Gomez
- The Last Bandit (1949) - Patrick Moreno
- Streets of San Francisco (1949) - Rocco
- Susanna Pass (1949) - Carlos
- The Great Sinner (1949) - Maharajah (uncredited)
- Jolson Sings Again (1949) - Mr. Estrada (uncredited)
- Joe Palooka in the Counterpunch (1949) - Announcer
- Sword in the Desert (1949) - Ahmed the Great (uncredited)
- Holiday in Havana (1949) - Mr. Estrada (uncredited)
- Border Incident (1949) - Col. Rafael Alvarado (uncredited)
- There's a Girl in My Heart (1949) - Luigi
- The Outriders (1950) - Father Damasco
- The Kid from Texas (1950) - Morales
- Fortunes of Captain Blood (1950) - Antonio Viamonte
- Crisis (1950) - Señor Magano (uncredited)
- A Lady Without Passport (1950) - Policeman (uncredited)
- Branded (1950) - Hernandez
- The Bandit Queen (1950) - Father Antonio
- Havana Rose (1951) - Philip
- Bride of the Gorilla (1951) - Native
- The Fighter (1952) - Luis Rivera
- 5 Fingers (1952) - Diello's Butler (uncredited)
- The Fabulous Senorita (1952) - Police Captain Garcia
- African Treasure (1952) - Pedro Sebastian
- Captain Pirate (1952) - Turk (uncredited)
- Bela Lugosi Meets a Brooklyn Gorilla (1952) - Pepe Bordo / Waiter
- The Snows of Kilimanjaro (1952) - Spanish Officer (uncredited)
- The Ring (1952) - Vidal Cantanios
- Tropical Heat Wave (1952) - Ignacio Ortega
- Woman in the Dark (1952) - 'Papa' Morello
- Adventures of Superman (1952–1955, TV Series) - Pedro / Chief of Police
- Tropic Zone (1953) - Croupier (uncredited)
- San Antone (1953) - Phillipa (uncredited)
- The Hitch-Hiker (1953) - Bartender (uncredited)
- Law and Order (1953) - Mexican Blacksmith (uncredited)
- Second Chance (1953) - Don Pascual (uncredited)
- Captain Scarface (1953) - Manuel
- Border River (1954) - Guzman
- Jubilee Trail (1954) - Don Rafael Velasco
- Secret of the Incas (1954) - (uncredited)
- The Law vs. Billy the Kid (1954) - Miguel Bolanos (uncredited)
- Green Fire (1954) - Gonzales (uncredited)
- Interrupted Melody (1955) - Dr. Ortega (uncredited)
- A Man Alone (1955) - Ortega
- Serenade (1956) - Romero (uncredited)
- Blackjack Ketchum, Desperado (1956) - Jaime Brigo
- The Unknown Terror (1957) - Old Native Villager
- Tip on a Dead Jockey (1957) - Pietro (uncredited)
- Gunsight Ridge (1957) - Ramon (uncredited)
- Man in the Shadow (1957) - Jesus Cisneros
- The Left Handed Gun (1958) - Saval
- Gunmen from Laredo (1959) - Jaro (uncredited)
- It Started with a Kiss (1959) - Señor Lagonzaga (uncredited)
- Cry Tough (1959) - Angry Man on Street (uncredited)
- The Last Angry Man (1959) - Angelo Travicanti - Neighbor-Patient (uncredited)
- Bat Masterson (1960) - Pia Anselm
- Lonely Are the Brave (1962) - Old Man
- The Alfred Hitchcock Hour (1963) (Season 1 Episode 21: "I'll Be Judge - I'll Be Jury") - Mexican Priest
- Fun in Acapulco (1963) - Manager of the Tropicana Hotel (uncredited)
- Island of the Blue Dolphins (1964) - The Priest
- The High Chaparral (1969, TV Series) - Francisco
- What Ever Happened to Aunt Alice? (1969) - Juan
