= Elena Verdugo =

American actress (1925–2017)

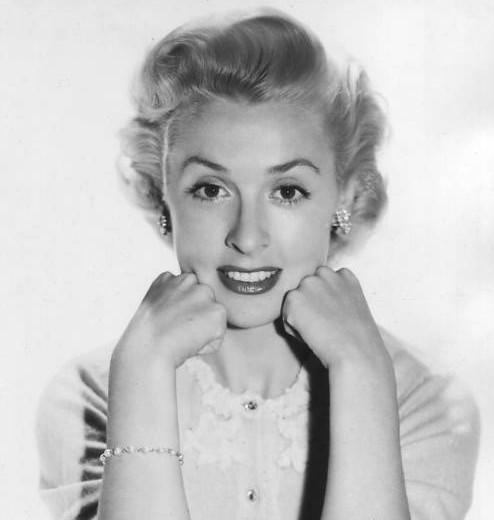
- Verdugo in 1955
- Born: Elena Angela Verdugo; April 20, 1925; Paso Robles, California, U.S.
- Died: May 30, 2017 (aged 92); Los Angeles, California, U.S.
- Occupation: Actress
- Years active: 1931–1985
- Spouses: Charles R. Marion (m. 1946; div. 1955) Charles R. Rosewall (m. 1972; died 2012)
- Children: 1

Elena Angela Verdugo (April 20, 1925 – May 30, 2017) was an American actress, who began in films at the age of five in Cavalier of the West (1931). Her career in radio, television, and film spanned six decades.

== Early life ==
Elena Angela Verdugo was born on April 20, 1925 in Paso Robles, California to Armando and Beatrice (née Kraft) Verdugo. Elena studied dance, drama, and music as a youngster.

== Career ==
=== Film ===
When Verdugo was 15, a judge appointed her mother as her legal guardian, so she could sign a film contract. One of her early appearances was in Down Argentine Way (1940). She made numerous film appearances through the 1940s, including two Universal horror films, House of Frankenstein and The Frozen Ghost. While filming the Abbott and Costello comedy Little Giant (1946), she met and married screenwriter Charles R. Marion, who also wrote for the comedy team's radio show.

Verdugo starred with Gene Autry and Stephen Dunne in The Big Sombrero (1949). She had a small part as the orange girl smitten by Cyrano's gallantry in the opening theater scene of the 1950 José Ferrer version of Cyrano de Bergerac. She co-starred in Thief of Damascus (1952) with Paul Henreid and John Sutton. Verdugo had a starring role as a singer in 1957's Panama Sal, a musical comedy film.

=== Radio and television ===
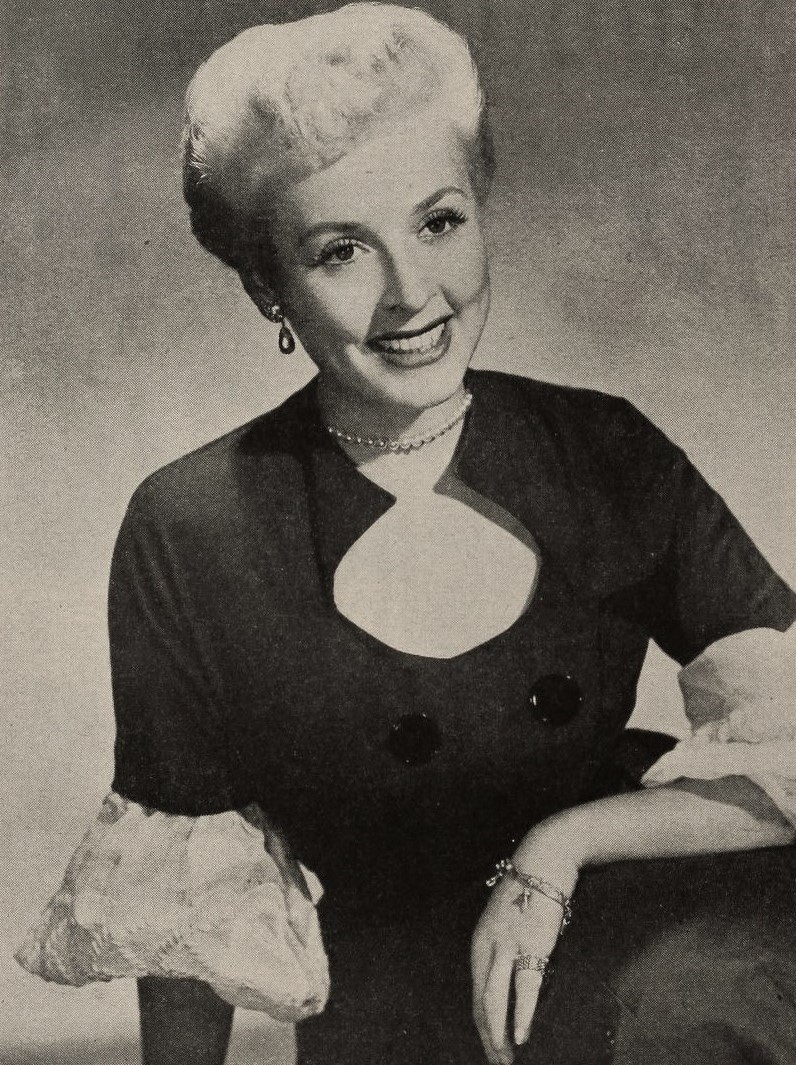
Verdugo in 1953

Verdugo had a flair for comedy, and she garnered much laughter and applause in the title role of the hit situation comedy Meet Millie on both radio and television (1952–1956). She guest starred on The Bob Cummings Show in a 1958 episode titled "Bob and the Ravishing Realtor", playing the part of the realtor. In 1959, she played Maria Carroyo in "Incident at Spanish Rock", an episode of Rawhide.

In May 1964, Verdugo appeared in a season-one episode of Petticoat Junction. She played business executive Mary Jane Hastings, who returns to Hooterville to accept an achievement award, but treats the men of the town—and her smitten male assistant—shabbily.

Verdugo is perhaps best-known today for her role as office assistant/nurse Consuelo Lopez in the ABC series Marcus Welby, M.D., starring with Robert Young in the title role and James Brolin as the medical associate. The series aired from 1969 to 1976.

== Recognition ==
In 1971 and 1972, Verdugo was nominated for Emmy Awards in the Outstanding Performance by an Actress in a Supporting Role in Drama category. Both nominations were for her performances on Marcus Welby, M.D.

She has a star at 1709 Vine Street in the television section of the Hollywood Walk of Fame. It was dedicated on February 8, 1960.

== Personal life and death ==
Verdugo is a descendant of José María Verdugo, a Spanish soldier and recipient of the Rancho San Rafael, a land grant that included what are today the cities of Glendale, Burbank, La Crescenta, and La Canada, and the Los Angeles neighborhoods of Atwater and Eagle Rock.

Verdugo and her first husband, Charles R. Marion, had one son, Richard Marion (born 1949), who became an actor/director. Her second husband was Dr. Charles Rosewall, a psychiatrist, who died in 2012.

Elena Verdugo died on May 30, 2017, in Los Angeles, at the age of 92.

== Filmography ==
| Year | Title | Role | Notes |
|---|---|---|---|
| 1931 | Cavalier of the West | Little Girl | Uncredited |
| 1940 | Down Argentine Way | Argentine Dancer | Uncredited |
| 1941 | Blood and Sand | Specialty Dancer | Uncredited |
| 1941 | The Hard-Boiled Canary | Girl | Uncredited |
| 1941 | Belle Starr | Young Girl | Uncredited |
| 1942 | To the Shores of Tripoli | Spanish Dancer | Uncredited |
| 1942 | The Moon and Sixpence | Ata | |
| 1944 | Rainbow Island | Moana | |
| 1944 | House of Frankenstein | Ilonka | |
| 1945 | The Frozen Ghost | Nina Coudreau | |
| 1946 | Little Giant | Martha Hill | |
| 1946 | Strange Voyage | Carmelita Lopez | |
| 1947 | Song of Scheherazade | Fioretta | |
| 1948 | Shed No Tears | Marilyn | |
| 1948 | El Dorado Pass | Dolores | |
| 1949 | The Big Sombrero | Estrellita Estrada | |
| 1949 | Tuna Clipper | Bianca Pereira | |
| 1949 | The Lost Tribe | Li Wanna | |
| 1949 | Sky Dragon | Connie Jackson, alias Marie Burke | |
| 1950 | The Lost Volcano | Nona | |
| 1950 | Snow Dog | Andrée Blanchard | |
| 1950 | Cyrano de Bergerac | Orange Girl | |
| 1951 | Gene Autry and the Mounties | Marie Duval | |
| 1952 | Thief of Damascus | Neela | |
| 1952 | Jet Job | Marge Stevens | |
| 1952 | The Pathfinder | Lokawa | |
| 1953 | The Marksman | Jane Warren | |
| 1957 | Panama Sal | Sal Regan | |
| 1965 | Day of the Nightmare | Miss Devi | |
| 1968 | How Sweet It Is! | Vera Wax | |
| 1969 | Angel in my Pocket | Lila Sinclair | |
| 1978 | The Boss' Son | Betty | |

== Television ==
| Year | Title | Role | Notes |
|---|---|---|---|
| 1960 | Rawhide | Marie Carroyo | S2:E11, "Incident at Spanish Rock" |
| 1969–1976 | Marcus Welby, M.D. | Consuelo Lopez | Regular |
