= The Invisible Host =

1930 novel by Gwen Bristow and Bruce Manning

- First edition
- Author: Gwen Bristow & Bruce Manning
- Original title: The Invisible Host
- Language: English
- Genre: Mystery, crime, psychological thriller, horror
- Publisher: The Mystery League, Inc.
- Publication date: 1930
- Publication place: United States
- ISBN: 978-1417917518

The Invisible Host is a 1930 American mystery/thriller novel written by the husband-wife team of Gwen Bristow and Bruce Manning. It was published by The Mystery League, Inc. Though little remembered today, it did well enough in its own time for Hollywood to adapt it into a feature film, 1934's The Ninth Guest (which name would also be utilized for subsequent editions of the book). Before its cinematic adaptation, Pulitzer Prize winning dramatist Owen Davis had adapted it for a 1930 Broadway play with the same name as the subsequent film (The Ninth Guest). It could be considered an example of the "old dark house" type of thriller.

It has been noted that Agatha Christie's much more famous tale, 1939's And Then There Were None, bears striking similarities to this novel. Predating Christie's text by almost a decade, The Invisible Host tells the story of eight people who are invited to a deserted, well-appointed New Orleans penthouse by an anonymous invitation. There is no evidence Agatha Christie saw either the play (which had a brief run on Broadway from August to October 1930) or the 1934 film.

Once at the penthouse the guests, who are all known to each other, are served a superb dinner. Shortly thereafter, they are made aware by a voice over the radio that they are all going to die before the night is out. The unseen host has meticulously prepared the demise of each guest, and has booby-trapped the penthouse to prevent anyone from escaping. As they steadily succumb to the murderer's devices, some begin to suspect that the killer may be one of them.

== Characters ==
- Henry Abbott – professor
- Margaret Chisholm – socialite
- Peter Daly – playwright
- Sylvia Inglesby – lawyer
- Jason Osgood – businessman
- Dr. Murray Chambers Reid – university professor
- Tim Slamon (not Salmon) – politician
- Jean Trent – actress
- Hawkins, the Butler
