= Island Captives =

- Theatrical release poster
- Directed by: Paul Kerschner
- Screenplay by: Al Martin
- Produced by: Stephen Tabor
- Starring: Edward Nugent; Joan Barclay; Henry Brandon; Charles King; Forrest Taylor; Carmen Laroux
- Cinematography: Paul Ivano; Paul Kerschner; Arthur Reed
- Edited by: Dan Milner
- Production company: Falcon Pictures Corporation
- Distributed by: William Steiner
- Release date: July 22, 1937
- Running time: 53 minutes
- Country: United States
- Language: English

Island Captives is a 1937 American adventure film directed by Paul Kerschner and written by Al Martin. The film stars Edward Nugent, Joan Barclay, Henry Brandon, Charles King, Forrest Taylor and Carmen Laroux. The film was released on July 22, 1937, by William Steiner. This film is in the public domain.

== Plot ==
The story follows Helen Carsons whose father was recently murdered and Tom Willoughby who is the son of the murderer, as they get shipwrecked in a jungle island that serves as headquarters of a smuggling ring.

== Cast ==
- Edward Nugent as Tom Willoughby
- Joan Barclay as Helen Carsons
- Henry Brandon as Dick Bannister
- Charles King as Kelly
- Forrest Taylor as Hudson
- Carmen Laroux as Taino
- Frederick Farmer as Graham
- John Beck as Carsons
- John Sheehan as Police Captain
