= The Face of Marble =

1946 film by William Beaudine

- Directed by: William Beaudine
- Written by: Edmund Hartmann; Michael Jacoby; Wilhelm Thiele
- Produced by: Jeffrey Bernerd
- Starring: John Carradine; Claudia Drake; Robert Shayne
- Cinematography: Harry Neumann
- Edited by: William Austin
- Music by: Edward J. Kay
- Production company: Hollywood Pictures Corporation
- Distributed by: Monogram Pictures
- Release date: January 19, 1946
- Running time: 72 minutes
- Country: United States
- Language: English

The Face of Marble is a 1946 American horror film directed by William Beaudine and starring John Carradine, Claudia Drake and Robert Shayne.

== Plot ==
The plot of the movie revolves around Dr. Charles Randolph, a scientist who is conducting experiments in the hopes of transferring the brain of a dying man into the body of a cadaver. His experiments lead to the creation of a monstrous, living statue that becomes a deadly threat to those around it.

The film combines elements of science fiction and horror, and it is known for its atmospheric and eerie tone. It's a B-movie from the 1940s and is considered a cult classic by some fans of vintage horror films.

== Cast ==
- John Carradine as Dr. Charles Randolph
- Claudia Drake as Elaine Randolph
- Robert Shayne as Dr. David Cochran
- Maris Wrixon as Linda Sinclair
- Willie Best as Shadrach
- Thomas E. Jackson as Inspector Norton
- Rosa Rey as Maria
- Neal Burns as Jeff, fingerprint expert
- Donald Kerr as 2nd Photographer
- Allan Ray as 1st Photographer

== Release ==
=== Home media ===
The film was released on DVD by Shout Factory on October 1, 2013, as a part of its "Timeless Horror" movie pack. It was later released by VFN on August 7, 2018.

== Reception ==
On his website Fantastic Movie Musings and Ramblings, Dave Sindelar stated that the film had some interesting ideas and featured a good performance by Carradine, but was undone by the lack of humor, and uninteresting romantic sub-plot. Dennis Schwartz from Ozus' World Movie Reviews awarded the film a grade B−, calling it "A goofy but entertaining 'mad scientist' cult film". TV Guide gave the film one out of four stars, pointing out Carradine's performance as the film's only worthwhile aspect.
