= Henry Brandon (actor) =

American character actor (1912–1990)

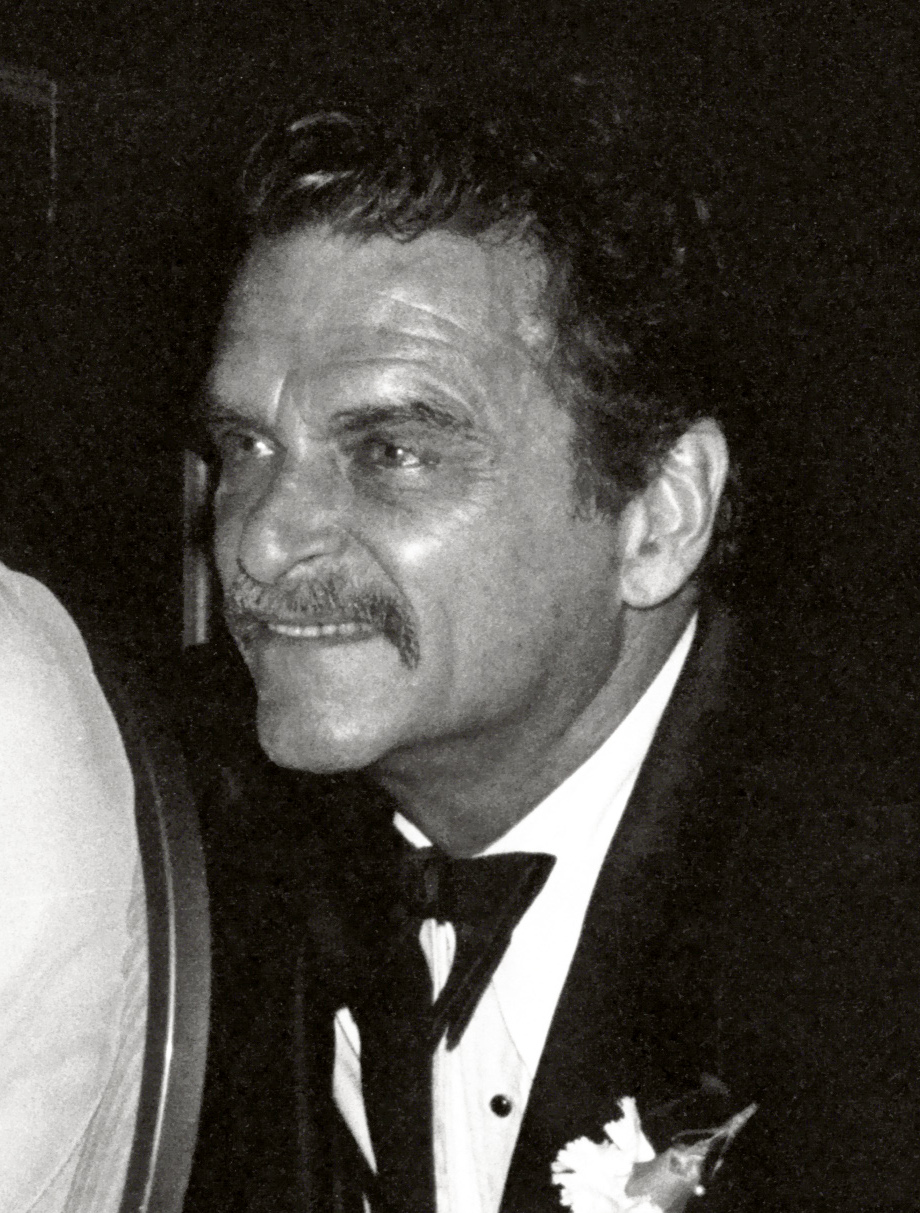
- Brandon in 1979
- Born: Heinrich von Kleinbach; June 8, 1912; Berlin, German Empire
- Died: February 15, 1990 (aged 77); Los Angeles, California, U.S.
- Other names: Harry Brandon; Harry Kleinbach; Henry Kleinbach
- Education: Stanford University
- Occupation: Actor
- Years active: 1932–1989
- Spouse: Delores Comley (m. 1941; div. 1946)
- Partner: Mark Herron (1969–1990)
- Children: 1

Henry Brandon (born Heinrich von Kleinbach; June 8, 1912 – February 15, 1990) was an American film and stage character actor with a career spanning almost 60 years, involving more than 100 films; he specialized in playing a wide diversity of ethnic roles.

== Early life ==
Brandon was born in 1912 in Berlin, German Empire, the son of Hildegard and Hugo R. von Kleinbach, a merchant. His parents emigrated to the United States while he was still an infant. After attending Stanford University, where he was a member of the Alpha Sigma Phi fraternity, he trained as a theatre actor at the Pasadena Community Playhouse and subsequently performed on Broadway, continuing to return to the stage periodically throughout his career.

== Film career ==
He made his motion picture debut in 1932 as an uncredited spectator at the Colosseum in The Sign of the Cross. In the Victorian-era stage melodrama The Drunkard – played for laughs in a popular local revival – Kleinbach appeared as the wizened old villain "Squire Cribbs". The 22-year-old Kleinbach was so convincing in elderly makeup that he fooled movie producer Hal Roach, who hired Kleinbach to play Silas Barnaby, the villain in the Laurel and Hardy feature Babes in Toyland. In 1936, having until then been performing under his real name, he adopted the stage name of Henry Brandon. He reprised the Barnaby character in Roach's short-subject production Our Gang Follies of 1938.

=== Character actor ===
Henry Brandon was a character player, often called upon to portray various ethnic types. He played the character of Renouf, a deserter from the French Foreign Legion, in the 1939 remake of Beau Geste. In 1943, he played Major Ruck, a British secret agent in the guise of an SS officer in Edge of Darkness. In 1948 he appeared as Giles de Rais in Joan of Arc. He appeared as the African tribal chieftain M'Tara in Tarzan and the She-Devil (1953), and a French army captain in Vera Cruz (1954).

In 1956, he played the chief villain, a Comanche chieftain called Scar, in John Ford's The Searchers. The following year he portrayed Jesse James in Hell's Crossroads. In 1958, he portrayed Acacius Page in Auntie Mame and on television starred in the episode "The Tall Man" of the NBC anthology series Decision. In 1959, he played the role of Gator Joe in "Woman in the River" in the crime drama Bourbon Street Beat. On October 12, 1959, he played the role of Jason in Euripides' Medea as a part of the Play of the Week television series.

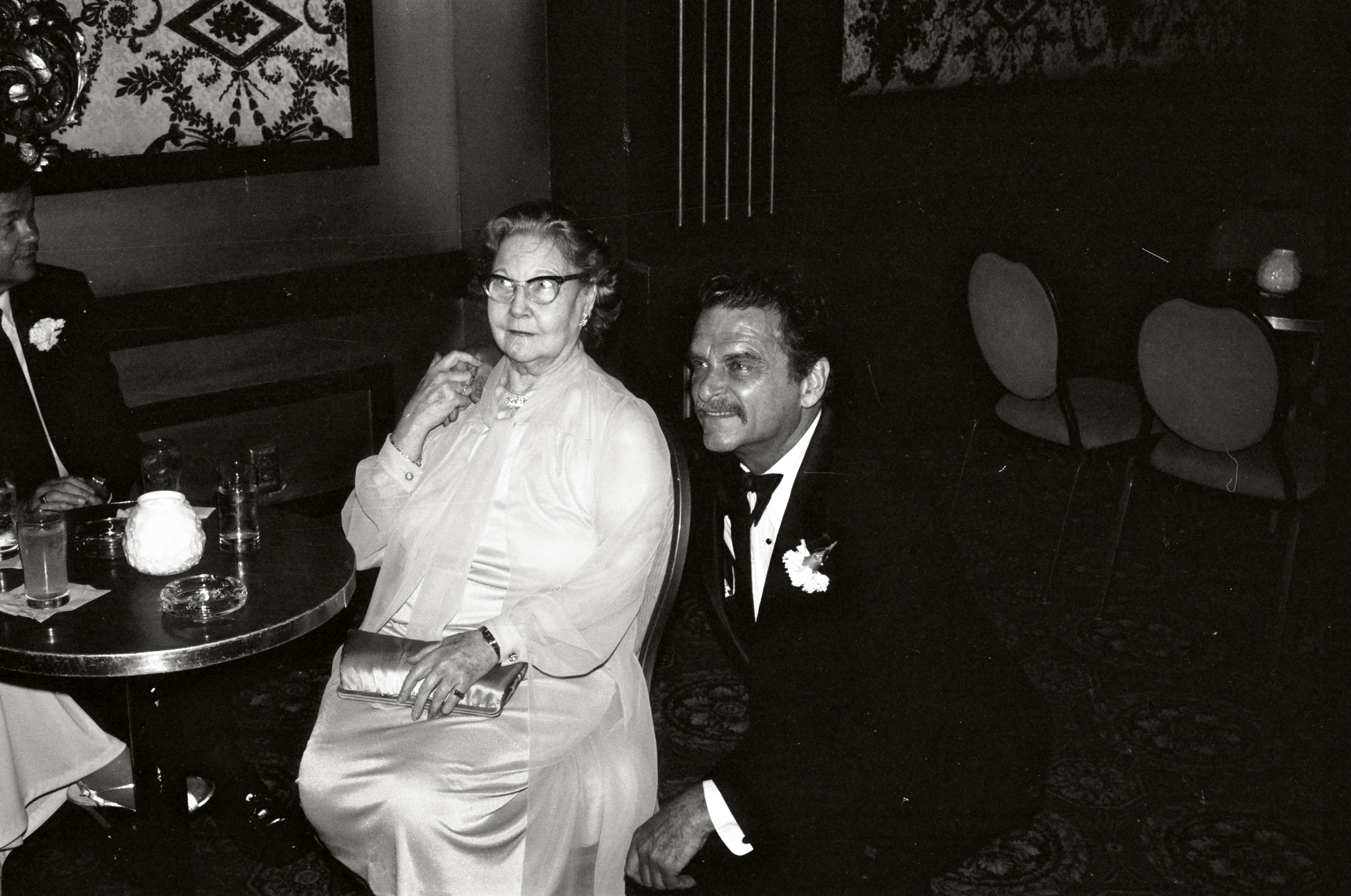
Henry Brandon with Una Merkel at the National Film Society convention, May 1979

In 1960, he played a Native American character again as Running Wolf in the episode "Gold Seeker" in the television series The Rebel. He played Asian characters in two 1961 episodes, viz. "Angel of Death" and "The Assassins", of the television series Adventures in Paradise and played an American Indian chieftain again in John Ford's Two Rode Together. In 1965, he played the Shug chief in the pilot episode of F Troop and made a guest appearance on the TV programme Honey West "A Matter of Wife and Death" (episode 4). Brandon once again played Squire Cribbs at long-running revivals of The Drunkard from the late 1950s through the mid-1960s at the Los Angeles Press Club theatre and, again, in the 1980s at the Hollywood Masquers Club theatre.

== Personal life ==
Brandon married in 1941; the marriage produced one son before ending in 1946. He subsequently had a long relationship with the actor Mark Herron. Herron left Brandon in the mid-1960s, and was briefly the fourth husband of Judy Garland. Herron and Garland separated after five months of marriage, after which Herron returned to Brandon and remained with him until Brandon's death.

== Death ==
Brandon lived in West Hollywood in his final years. He suffered a heart attack and died on February 15, 1990, at the age of 77, at Cedars-Sinai Hospital in Los Angeles. His body was cremated, and the ashes were reportedly scattered at an undisclosed theatre location.

== Selected filmography ==
- The Sign of the Cross (1932) as Colosseum Spectator (uncredited)
- Babes in Toyland (1934) as Silas Barnaby
- The Trail of the Lonesome Pine (1936) as Wade Falin
- The Preview Murder Mystery (1936) as The Bat Man (uncredited)
- Big Brown Eyes (1936) as Don Butler
- The Garden of Allah (1936) as Hadj
- Killer at Large (1936) as Mr. Zero
- Black Legion (1937) as Joe Dombrowski
- Jungle Jim (1937, Serial) as The Cobra
- Secret Agent X-9 (1937, Serial) as Blackstone
- I Promise to Pay (1937) as Henchman Fancyface
- Island Captives (1937) as Dick Bannister
- The Last Train from Madrid (1937) as Radio Announcer (uncredited)
- West Bound Limited (1937) as Joe Forbes
- Conquest (1937) as Staff Officer (uncredited)
- Wells Fargo (1937) as Larry (uncredited)
- I Met My Love Again (1938) as Bruno - the Painter (uncredited)
- Three Comrades (1938) as Valentin - Man with Eye Patch (uncredited)
- Spawn of the North (1938) as Davis (uncredited)
- If I Were King (1938) as Soldier (uncredited)
- The Last Express (1938) as Henchman Pinky
- The Last Warning (1938) as Willie the Creep (uncredited)
- Pirates of the Skies (1939) as Gang Pilot (uncredited)
- Buck Rogers (1939, Serial) as Captain Laska
- Beau Geste (1939) as Renouf - Another Deserter
- Conspiracy (1939) as Carlson - Crewman
- Nurse Edith Cavell (1939) as Lt. Schultz
- The Marshal of Mesa City (1939) as Duke Allison
- Geronimo (1939) (scenes deleted)
- Drums of Fu Manchu (1940) as Dr. Fu Manchu
- Half a Sinner (1940) as Handsome
- Ski Patrol (1940) as Jan Sikorsky
- Florian (1940) as Groom (uncredited)
- The Ranger and the Lady (1940) as General Augustus Larue
- Doomed to Die (1940) as Attorney Victor Martin
- Under Texas Skies (1940) as Tom Blackton
- Dark Streets of Cairo (1940) as Hussien
- The Son of Monte Cristo (1940) as Lt. Schultz
- Underground (1941) as Rolf
- Two in a Taxi (1941) as Professor
- The Shepherd of the Hills (1941) as Bald Knobber (uncredited)
- Hurricane Smith (1941) as Sam Carson
- Bad Man of Deadwood (1941) as Ted Carver
- The Corsican Brothers (1941) as Marquis de Raveneau (uncredited)
- Night in New Orleans (1942) as Croupier (uncredited)
- Edge of Darkness (1943) as Maj. Ruck (uncredited)
- Northwest Outpost (1947) as Chinese Junk Captain (uncredited)
- Old Los Angeles (1948) as Larry Stockton
- Canon City (1948) as Freeman
- Hollow Triumph (1948) as Big Boy (uncredited)
- Joan of Arc (1948) as Captain Gilles de Rais
- The Paleface (1948) as Wapato (medicine man)
- Wake of the Red Witch (1948) as Kurinua (uncredited)
- The Fighting O'Flynn (1949) as Lt. Corpe
- Tarzan's Magic Fountain (1949) as Siko
- Cattle Drive (1951) as Jim Currie
- The Golden Horde (1951) as Juchi, Son of Genghis Khan
- Flame of Araby (1951) as Malik
- Harem Girl (1952) as Hassan Ali
- Scarlet Angel (1952) as Pierre
- Wagons West (1952) as Clay Cook
- Hurricane Smith (1952) as Sam
- The War of the Worlds (1953) as Cop at Crash Site
- Scared Stiff (1953) as Pierre
- Pony Express (1953) as Joe Cooper
- Raiders of the Seven Seas (1953) as Captain Goiti
- Tarzan and the She-Devil (1953) as M'Tara, Locopo Chief
- The Caddy (1953) as Mr. Preen
- War Arrow (1953) as Maygro
- Knock on Wood (1954) as Second Trenchcoat Man
- Casanova's Big Night (1954) as Capt. Rugello
- Vera Cruz (1954) as Capt. Danette
- Lady Godiva of Coventry (1955) as Bejac
- Silent Fear (1956) as Cliff Sutton
- Comanche (1956) as Black Cloud
- The Searchers (1956) as Chief Cicatriz (Scar)
- Bandido (1956) as Gunther
- The Ten Commandments (1956) as Commander of the Hosts
- Hell's Crossroads (1957) as Jesse James
- The Land Unknown (1957) as Dr. Carl Hunter
- Omar Khayyam (1957) as Commander
- The Buccaneer (1958) as British Major
- Auntie Mame (1958) as Acacius Page
- Okefenokee (1959) as Joe Kalhari
- The Big Fisherman (1959) as Menicus
- Two Rode Together (1961) as Chief Quanah Parker
- Captain Sindbad (1963) as Colonel Kabar
- The Outer Limits (1964) as General Crawford
- So Long, Blue Boy (1973) as Buck
- The Manhandlers (1974) as Carlo
- When the North Wind Blows (1974) as Avakum
- Assault on Precinct 13 (1976) as Sgt. Chaney
- Run for the Roses (1977) as Jeff
- Mission to Glory: A True Story (1977) as Father Canion
- Bud and Lou (1978, TV Movie) as Bernie
- Hollywood Knight (1979) as Curley
- Evita Peron (1981, TV Movie) as General Ramirez
- To Be or Not to Be (1983) as Nazi Officer
- Wizards of the Lost Kingdom II (1989) as Zarz (final film role)

== Selected theatre performances ==
- Ramona (California, 1946 & 1947)
- Medea (New York, 1949)
- Twelfth Night (Broadway, 1949)
- The Lady's Not For Burning (New York, 1957)
- Arsenic and Old Lace (Florida, 1985)
