= Malcolm Atterbury =

American actor (1907–1992)

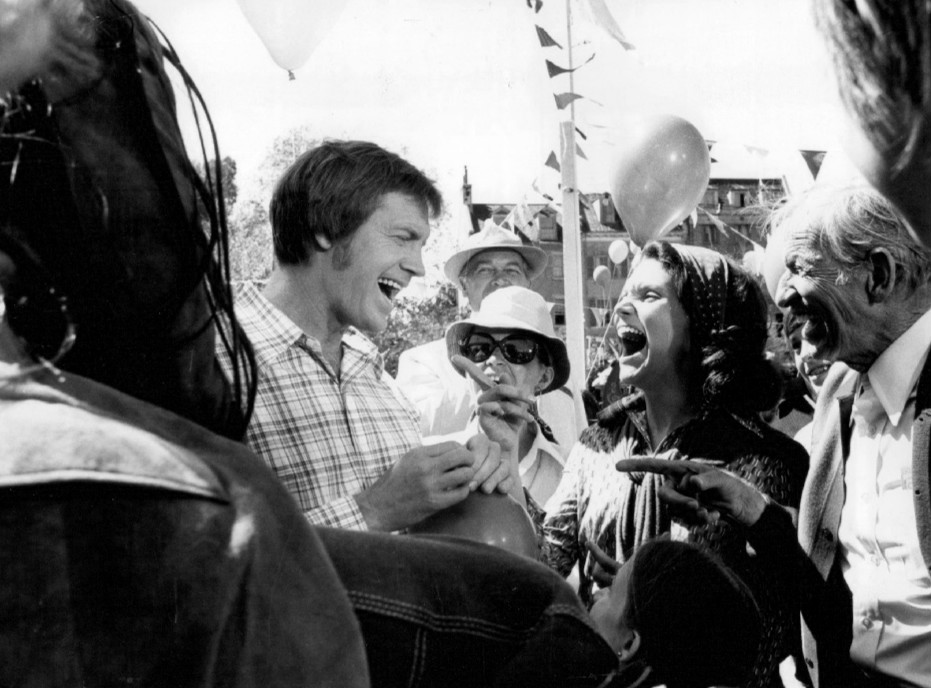
- Atterbury as Grandpa Aldon (right) with Apple's Way co-stars Ronny Cox and Frances Lee McCain
- Born: February 20, 1907; Philadelphia, Pennsylvania, U.S.
- Died: August 16, 1992 (aged 85); Beverly Hills, California, U.S.
- Occupation: Actor
- Years active: 1954–1979
- Spouse: Ellen Ayres Hardies (m. 1937)
- Children: 3

Malcolm MacLeod Atterbury (February 20, 1907 – August 16, 1992) was an American stage, film, and television actor and vaudevillian.

== Early years and education ==
A native of Philadelphia, Atterbury was the son of Malcolm MacLeod, Sr. and Arminia Clara (Rosengarten) MacLeod. He had an older sister, Elizabeth, a twin brother, Norman, and a younger brother, George Rosengarten MacLeod. After his father's death his mother remarried to General William Wallace Atterbury, president of Pennsylvania Railroad. Through this marriage, he had a half-brother, William Wallace Atterbury Jr.

He graduated from The Hill School in Pottstown, Pennsylvania.

In the mid-1930s, Atterbury decided to pursue a career in drama. He enrolled at Hilda Spong's Dramatic School using an assumed name. Later, after revealing his true identity, he went on to "finance a summer theater for the Hilda Spong Players at Cape May, and they, in turn, asked him to be their managing director."

== Career ==
=== Radio ===
In 1928, Atterbury was the bass singer in a quartet that sang on WLIT in Philadelphia. In 1930, he became the program director of a radio station in Philadelphia. He went on to become business manager of WHAT.

=== Theatre ===
Atterbury was a devoted theatre actor. He owned and operated two theatres in the Adirondack Mountains of New York, the Tamarack Playhouse in Lake Pleasant, New York and the Albany Playhouse Co. in Albany. He also appeared on Broadway in the original cast of One Flew Over the Cuckoo's Nest, as Scanlon.

=== Film ===
Atterbury is perhaps best known for his uncredited role in Alfred Hitchcock's North by Northwest (1959), as the rural man who exclaims, "That plane's dustin' crops where there ain't no crops!" Four years later, Atterbury appeared as the deputy in Hitchcock's The Birds (1963). He further appeared in such films as I Was a Teenage Werewolf (1957), Crime of Passion (1957), Blue Denim (1959), Wild River (1960), Advise and Consent (1962), and Hawaii (1966). His last film was Emperor of the North (1973).

=== Television ===
Atterbury made frequent appearances on television. He was cast in five episodes of CBS's murder mystery series Perry Mason during the late 1950s and early 1960s. Three times he played the murderer. He played Sam Burris in the 1957 episode "The Case of the Angry Mourner".

His guest-starring roles included appearances on Gunsmoke, The Twilight Zone, Alfred Hitchcock Presents, The Asphalt Jungle, Have Gun - Will Travel (episode: "Shot by Request"), Wagon Train, Window on Main Street, Straightaway, Bonanza, Hazel, Kentucky Jones, The Odd Couple (1970 TV series, episode: "A Barnacle Adventure"), The Rookies, The Sheriff of Cochise, The Fugitive, State Trooper, Rescue 8, Fury, The Man from Blackhawk, The Tall Man, The Invaders (episode: "The Trial") and The Andy Griffith Show (episode: "The Cow Thief", 1962), The Bob Newhart Show (episode: "No Sale").

He had a rare regular role as Grandfather Aldon in the 1974–1975 CBS television family drama Apple's Way.

== Personal life ==
Atterbury was married on February 6, 1937 to Ellen Ayres Hardies of Amsterdam, New York, daughter of judge Charles E. Hardies Sr. and sister of Charles Hardies Jr., who later became Montgomery County district attorney.

== Filmography ==
- Dragnet (1954) - Lee Reinhard
- Man Without a Star (1955) - Fancy Joe Toole (uncredited)
- The Rawhide Years (1955) - Luke, Paymaster (uncredited)
- Alfred Hitchcock Presents (1956) (Season 1 Episode 27: "Help Wanted") as the Blackmailer
- Silent Fear (1956) - Dr. Vernon
- Gunsmoke (1956) - (twice) Seldon & Liveryman
- The Lone Ranger (1956) - Phineas Tripp (uncredited)
- Frontier (1956) Season 1, Episode 19 The Assassin as Donley
- The Steel Jungle (1956) - Mailman
- Miracle in the Rain (1956) - Special Delivery Man (uncredited)
- Stranger at My Door (1956) - Reverend Hastings
- A Day of Fury (1956) - Gaunt Farmer (uncredited)
- Crime in the Streets (1956) - Mr. McAllister
- Dakota Incident (1956) - Bartender / Desk Clerk
- Johnny Concho (1956) - Milo, Mail Dispatcher (uncredited)
- Storm Center (1956) - Frank (uncredited)
- Toward the Unknown (1956) - Hank - Bell Technical Representative
- Reprisal! (1956) - Luther Creel (uncredited)
- Crime of Passion (1957) - Police Officer Spitz
- Slander (1957) - Byron (uncredited)
- Hot Summer Night (1957) - Jim - Newspaper Man on Street (uncredited)
- Fury at Showdown (1957) - Norris
- I Was a Teenage Werewolf (1957) - Charles Rivers
- Valerie (1957) - Sheriff
- Blood of Dracula (1957) - Lieutenant Dunlap
- The Walter Winchell File "The Witness" (1957) - Major Frank Spears
- The Dalton Girls (1957) - Mr. Sewell, the Bank Manager
- Perry Mason (1957) (Season 1 Episode 7: "The Case of the Angry Mourner") - Sam Burris
- Too Much, Too Soon (1958) - Older Attendant (scenes deleted)
- The High Cost of Loving (1958) - Harry Lessing (uncredited)
- From Hell to Texas (1958) - Hotel Clerk
- No Time for Sergeants (1958) - Bus Driver with Applications (uncredited)
- How to Make a Monster (1958) - Security Guard Richards
- Badman's Country (1958) - Buffalo Bill Cody
- Rio Bravo (1959) - Jake (Stage Driver) (scenes deleted)
- The Twilight Zone (1959) (Season 1 Episode 3: ‘Mr. Denton on Doomsday’) - Henry J. Fate
- High School Big Shot (1959) - Mr. Grant
- North by Northwest (1959) - Man at prairie crossing (uncredited)
- Blue Denim (1959) - Marriage License Clerk (uncredited)
- Hell Bent for Leather (1960) - Gamble
- Wild River (1960) - Sy Moore
- From the Terrace (1960) - George Fry
- Route 66 (1960) (Season 1 Episode 1: "Black November") - Bolton
- Summer and Smoke (1961) - Reverend Winemiller
- Advise & Consent (1962) - Senator Tom August
- The Birds (1963) - Deputy Al Malone
- Cattle King (1963) - Abe Clevenger
- Bob Hope Presents the Chrysler Theatre, episode:"A Killing at Sundial" (1963)
- Seven Days in May (1964) - Horace - White House Physician (uncredited)
- The Fugitive (1964) (Season 2 Episode 3: ‘Man on a String’) -Sheriff Mead
- Joy in the Morning (1965) - Willis J. Calamus (uncredited)
- The Fugitive (1966) (Season 3 Episode 20: ‘Stroke of Genius’) - Sheriff Bilson
- Bonanza (1966) (Episode: 'The Unwritten Commandment') - Willard Walker
- The Chase (1966) - Mr. Reeves
- Hawaii (1966) - Gideon Hale
- The Hardy Boys (1969) - Clams Daggett
- The Learning Tree (1969) - Silas Newhall
- Emperor of the North (1973) - Hogger
- The Towering Inferno (1974) - Jeweler (uncredited)
- The Bob Newhart Show (1976) (Season 4 Episode 16: 'No Sale') – Mr. Arbogast
- Police Story (1978) (Season 5 Episode 4: 'Day of Terror... Night of Fear') – Alfred Weiser
- Quincy M.E. (1978) (Season 4 Episode 8: 'No Way to Treat a Body') – Raymond Kaufman
- Little House on the Prairie (1979) (Season 6 Episode 13: 'The Angry Heart') - Brewster Davenport
