= The Kid from Texas =

1950 film by Kurt Neumann

- Film poster
- Directed by: Kurt Neumann
- Written by: Robert Hardy Andrews; Karl Kamb
- Based on: a story by Robert Hardy Andrews
- Produced by: Paul Short
- Starring: Audie Murphy; Gale Storm
- Cinematography: Charles Van Enger
- Edited by: Frank Gross
- Production company: Universal Pictures
- Distributed by: Universal-International Pictures
- Release dates: February 10, 1950 (Toronto); March 24, 1950 (Los Angeles); June 1, 1950
- Running time: 78 minutes
- Country: United States
- Language: English

The Kid from Texas is a 1950 American film starring Audie Murphy in his first Technicolor Western. It was directed by Kurt Neumann and features Gale Storm and Albert Dekker.

== Plot ==
In Lincoln County, New Mexico Territory in 1879, a group of men who work for Major Harper, led by gunslinger Minniger, attempt to arrest rancher Alexander Kain and his English partner Jameson. They are stopped by William Bonney, also known as Billy the Kid, who shoots and injures them.

Jameson offers Billy a job as a ranch hand. A drunken group of Harper's men attack the ranch and kill Jameson. Billy embarks on a killing rampage, encouraged by the manipulative Kain, who publicly decries Billy's efforts. Governor Lew Wallace offers Billy a pardon, which he declines. Pat Garrett is sent to catch Billy.

== Cast ==
- Audie Murphy as Billy the Kid
- Gale Storm as Irene Kain
- Albert Dekker as Alexander Kain
- Shepperd Strudwick as Jameson
- Will Geer as O'Fallon
- William Talman as Minniger
- Martin Garralaga as Morales
- Robert H. Barrat as General Lew Wallace
- Walter Sande as Crowe
- Frank Wilcox as Pat Garrett
- Dennis Hoey as Major Harper
- Ray Teal as Sheriff Rand
- Don Haggerty as Morgan
- Paul Ford as Sheriff Copeland
- John Phillips as Sid Curtis
- Harold Goodwin as Matt Curtis
- Zon Murray as Lucas
- Tom Trout as Denby
- Rosa Turich as Maria
- Dorita Pallais as Lupita
- Pilar Del Rey as Marguarita

== Production ==
The film fictionalizes the true events of the Lincoln County War but follows the basic facts. Jameson (Shepperd Strudwick) is based on John Tunstall and Alexander Kain (Albert Dekker) on Alexander McSween.

Audie Murphy was cast after his performance as a juvenile delinquent in Bad Boy. J. Edgar Hoover offered to narrate the film, but Parley Baer was selected as the narrator.

== Reception ==
In a contemporary review for The New York Times, critic A. H. Weiler wrote: "[T]he redoubtable Billy picked mighty nice country in which to operate even if those operations were not especially exciting. ... But despite an occasional bit of gunplay and the facts as supplied by the commentary, 'The Kid From Texas' doesn't give special stature to a noted saga. Anyway, that saga isn't dead."
