= Starlight Over Texas =

1938 film

- Theatrical release poster
- Directed by: Albert Herman
- Screenplay by: John Rathmell
- Story by: Harry MacPherson
- Produced by: Edward Finney
- Starring: Tex Ritter; Carmen Laroux; Rosa Turich; Karl Hackett; Horace Murphy; Snub Pollard
- Cinematography: Francis Corby
- Edited by: Fred Bain
- Music by: Frank Sanucci
- Production company: Monogram Pictures
- Distributed by: Monogram Pictures
- Release date: September 7, 1938
- Running time: 58 minutes
- Country: United States
- Language: English

Starlight Over Texas is a 1938 American Western film directed by Albert Herman and written by John Rathmell. The film stars Tex Ritter in his first film for Monogram Pictures, Carmen Laroux, Rosa Turich, Karl Hackett, Horace Murphy and Snub Pollard. The film was released on September 7, 1938, by Monogram Pictures.

== Cast ==
- Tex Ritter as Tex Newman
- Carmen Laroux as Rosita Ruiz
- Rosa Turich as Maria
- Karl Hackett as Kildare
- Horace Murphy as Ananias
- Snub Pollard as Pee Wee
- Charles King as Hank Boston
- Martin Garralaga as Captain Gomez
- George Chesebro as Ashley Hill
- Carlos Villarías as Governor Ruiz
- Ed Cassidy as Captain Brooks
- Salvatore Damino as Ramon Ruiz
