= Jubilee Trail =

1950 American novel by Gwen Bristow

First edition (publ. Thomas Y. Crowell)

Jubilee Trail is an American novel written by Gwen Bristow, published in 1950. It follows the adventures of two strong women in the mid-19th century as they travel across the United States to the then-Mexican territory of California. The novel is still in print, with forewords included by Nancy E. Turner and Sandra Dallas.

The rights to the book were purchased at great expense by Republic Pictures as a starring vehicle for B movie actress Vera Hrubá Ralston, who was married to the head of studio. Jubilee Trail was released in 1954.

In the National Review in 1996, journalist Florence King described Jubilee Trail as a "good girl/bad girl western in which the male characters are all satellites".

== Plot summary ==
The story begins with Garnet Cameron, an 18-year-old young woman from upper-class New York society. Garnet has just graduated from her finishing school and is trying to find a direction for her life now that her schooling is done. That summer, a young man by the name of Oliver Hale comes to New York. He is in town to buy supplies from the estate of Mr. Selkirk, a wealthy murdered man, to bring west with him. Oliver Hale is a frontier trader from California and Garnet is immediately drawn to him. He treats her as an equal and talks to her as "a human being", telling her about the journey to the unknown territory of California. Garnet is riveted by Oliver's tales of adventure and excitement and longs to see the things he tells her about. Promising to take her west with him, Oliver proposes marriage and Garnet happily accepts. They are quickly married and begin their journey that March. The plan is that Garnet will travel to California with Oliver while he closes up his business out west and they both will return to New York the following year.

Oliver and Garnet travel first to New Orleans. Garnet is fascinated by the grandeur of the city. Oliver takes her to a dance hall called the Flower Garden, something Garnet would never have been allowed to do back in New York. In the Flower Garden, a blonde actress named Juliette La Tour stops the show with her talent for stage presence and performance. That evening, as the couple eats dinner, Garnet has a meeting with Juliette when two drunk men try to make a move on Garnet and the actress sends them away. Juliette tells Garnet that her real name is Florinda Grove.

The next day, Garnet spots Florinda hiding in the hallways of her hotel. Florinda tells Garnet that a man from New York wants to arrest Florinda for the murder of Mr. Selkirk. Garnet and Oliver decide to help Florinda escape arrest by disguising her as a widow and sending her to St. Louis. Florinda is very grateful and she and Garnet become fast friends. Shortly after Florinda leaves, Garnet and Oliver leave New Orleans for St. Louis, themselves.

Beyond St. Louis, Garnet and Oliver set out to cross the Great Plains. The trail is hard-going, but Garnet enjoys it with wide-eyed wonder. She questions Oliver about his brother Charles, whom they will be staying with in California, but Oliver is reluctant to talk on the subject of his brother and Garnet lets it drop. They arrive in Santa Fe several months after leaving St. Louis and Garnet is reunited with Florinda, who was traveling "in sin" with a deacon from St. Louis. She and Garnet rekindle their friendship. Shortly after their arrival in Santa Fe, the traders from California arrive in the city, too. Garnet is introduced to several of Oliver's friends: John Ives, Oliver's standoff-ish business partner, and fellow traders of the Jubilee Trail (the name of the trail from Santa Fe to California) Silky van Dorn, Elijah Penrose, and Texas. Florinda drops the deacon and makes the decision to travel to California with the traders.

On the trail to California, Garnet and Florinda endure harsh temperatures, lack of water, and other such hardships with stoicism and bravery. Both women build friendships with the men of the trail, most notable of which is John's gradual warming to Garnet. They share a mutual appreciation of the scenery and he grows to respect both Garnet and Florinda for their sheer will and determination. The train finally arrives in California with much rejoicing, although Florinda quickly succumbs to exhaustion brought on by the trail. Garnet also finally meets Oliver's brother, Charles, who makes no secret of the fact that he hates her. Garnet convinces John to take care of Florinda, as she herself must leave for Charles' rancho to the north.

Garnet finds out quickly that Charles is basically controlling Oliver. Oliver, who once was a strong and outgoing man, is reduced to the attitude of a child when he is around Charles. During an earthquake at Charles' rancho, Garnet discovers a letter from Charles to Oliver. The letter reveals that before leaving California last year, Oliver had a tryst with the daughter of a wealthy native Californian and the girl gave birth to a son. Charles was delighted at the opportunity to gain control of the property and expected Oliver to marry the girl on his return. He was shocked to discover he had gotten married in New York. Garnet's respect for Oliver continues to falter as she realizes that he is not the man she thought she was marrying. Shortly after this revelation, Garnet also realizes that she herself is pregnant and will be due sometime while she and Oliver are out on the prairie for the return trip east. In the midst of all this emotional turmoil, the young Californio woman kills herself and her baby. In a grief-stricken rage, her father storms into Charles' rancho and kills Oliver.

After Oliver's death, Garnet nearly dies, but is rescued by John Ives and Florinda and taken to Florinda's Los Angeles saloon where she lives among new friends, including the magnificent Russian friend of John Ives. Her son is born amid the drama of California's joining the United States and the reality that Charles Hale wants to take her son from her. By the end of the story gold has been discovered on Sutter's Mill and John and Garnet fall in love and are married.
