= Cheyenne Rides Again =

1937 film

- DVD artwork
- Directed by: Robert F. Hill
- Written by: Alfred Block
- Produced by: Sam Katzman
- Starring: Tom Tyler; Lon Chaney Jr.; Carmen Laroux; Lucile Browne; Ed Cassidy; Ted Lorch
- Cinematography: William Hyer
- Edited by: Charles Henkel Jr.
- Production company: Victory Pictures
- Distributed by: Victory Pictures (1937); Alpha Video (DVD)
- Release date: 1937
- Running time: 56 minutes
- Country: United States
- Language: English

Cheyenne Rides Again is a 1937 Western film directed by Robert F. Hill. It stars Tom Tyler and Lon Chaney Jr. Much as did Alfred Hitchcock in his own films, director Hill appears in a cameo as townsman "Bartender Ed".

== Plot ==
Tom 'Cheyenne Tommy' Wade (Tom Tyler), is a lawman who poses as a gang member in an attempt to expose Girard (Lon Chaney Jr.), a fraudulent cattle thief. He steals one thousand dollars from the thief, promising to return it if he can join the gang, while plotting a way to expose them as thieves. As Cheyenne is let into the gang, he begins to blackmail the leader, forcing him to let more law enforcers join the gang, eventually outnumbering them and finally arresting the thieves for good.

== Cast ==
- Tom Tyler as Tom 'Cheyenne Tommy' Wade
- Lon Chaney Jr. as Girard
- Carmen Laroux as Panela
- Lucile Browne as Sally Lane
- Ed Cassidy as Dave Gleason
- Ted Lorch as Rollin
- Merrill McCormick as Gang Member
- Slim Whitaker as Sheriff Jed Martin
- Robert F. Hill as Bartender Ed
- Merrill McCormick as Henchman
- Jack Smith as Jack
- Roger Williams as Henchman Mack

== Reception ==
Reception for Cheyenne Rides Again was generally positive. Film historian Hal J. Wollstein wrote that: "The Katzman stamp of poverty is all over this Victory Pictures production, but it is fun to watch Tyler and Chaney, both of whom would later star as the mummy, Kharis, for Universal in the '40s." TV Guide offered that while the film was not very good, Tom Tyler's character kept the film moving.

== Release ==
The film aired on television on January 9, 1965 as one of the many western films shared on The Wild Bill Elliott Show. Alpha Video released Cheyenne Rides Again on DVD on April 27, 2010.
