= Secret Beyond the Door =

1947 film by Fritz Lang

- Theatrical release poster
- Directed by: Fritz Lang
- Screenplay by: Silvia Richards
- Based on: Museum Piece No. 13 (1946) novel by Rufus King
- Produced by: Fritz Lang
- Starring: Joan Bennett; Michael Redgrave
- Cinematography: Stanley Cortez
- Edited by: Arthur Hilton
- Music by: Miklós Rózsa
- Production companies: Walter Wanger Productions; Diana Production Company
- Distributed by: Universal Pictures
- Release date: December 24, 1947
- Running time: 99 minutes
- Country: United States
- Language: English
- Budget: $1.5 million or $615,065 or $1.8 million
- Box office: $700,000

Secret Beyond the Door is a 1947 American psychological horror thriller film and a modern updating of the Bluebeard fairytale, directed by Fritz Lang, produced by Lang's Diana Productions, and released by Universal Pictures. The film stars Joan Bennett and was produced by her husband Walter Wanger. The black-and-white horror drama is about a woman who suspects her new architect husband plans to kill her.

== Plot ==
New York heiress Celia Barrett and her lawyer Bob Dwight are on the verge of marriage, but he wants her to be sure so convinces her to vacation in Mexico with her friend Edith Potter. While there, Celia falls in love with and marries American architect Mark Lamphere. On their honeymoon, after she playfully locks him out of their hotel room, he turns cold towards her and abruptly leaves, claiming that he has urgent business at home and will make arrangements for her to follow.

Five days later, Celia arrives at Mark's home town of Levender Falls. Mark is in the city on business so it is his sister Caroline who meets Celia at the train station and takes her to the family estate, Blade's Creek. Celia is surprised to learn that Mark is a widower with a teenaged son. The boy, David, is being looked after by Caroline and by Mark's secretary, Miss Robey, who wears a scarf to conceal the side of her face, which was scarred some years earlier when she rescued David from a fire. Sister Caroline hints that Mark is somewhat responsible for his first wife Eleanor's death; son David, estranged from Mark, says that his father murdered her. At a party, Mark shows the guests six rooms he built in a wing of the mansion, each a reconstruction of a notorious murder scene, all with female victims. A seventh room is locked and Mark refuses to show it.

Miss Robey accidentally reveals her full face to Celia and admits that she had plastic surgery to remove the scar. The Lampheres don't know this; maintaining the pretence ensures their sympathy, without which Miss Robey would be fired. Celia realizes that Miss Robey resents her for marrying Mark.

Mark's behaviour towards Celia is increasingly erratic. She manages to secretly enter the seventh room, which is a duplicate of her bedroom. She concludes that Mark intends to murder her, and she flees the house.

Although Mark loves Celia, he has a recurring urge to kill her, which he struggles to suppress. Celia returns because she loves Mark and is determined to help him, but he is alarmed at the prospect of their being alone in the house—Caroline is taking David to New York, Miss Robey has been fired, and the servants are away. To protect Celia, Mark leaves, but his compulsion draws him back. He finds Celia waiting for him in the seventh room—she would rather die than live without him. She implores him to recall the childhood trauma at the root of his homicidal tendencies, which are triggered by lilacs and locked doors. As he is telling Celia of his boyhood distress at being locked in his bedroom by his mother, they hear the door being locked, which sends him into a homicidal trance. Celia explains that it was not his mother but his sister who locked his bedroom door, and he regains his senses. They notice smoke: Miss Robey, thinking that Celia is alone, has locked them in and set fire to the house. Mark breaks down the door and they escape.

They resume their honeymoon in Mexico. Mark tells Celia that she has killed the root of the evil in him.

== Cast ==
- Joan Bennett as Celia Lamphere
- Michael Redgrave as Mark Lamphere
- Anne Revere as Caroline Lamphere
- Barbara O'Neil as Miss Robey
- Natalie Schafer as Edith Potter
- Paul Cavanagh as Rick Barrett
- Anabel Shaw as Intellectual Sub-Deb
- Rosa Rey as Paquita
- James Seay as Bob Dwight
- Mark Dennis as David Lamphere

== Release ==
The film recorded a loss of $1,145,000.

Secret Beyond the Door was released in the UK on DVD in November 2011 by Exposure Cinema. Olive Films released the film in the United States on DVD and Blu-ray on September 4, 2012.

== Reception ==
Rotten Tomatoes, a review aggregator, reports that 61% of 18 surveyed critics gave the film a positive review.

=== Contemporary ===
Film critic Bosley Crowther of The New York Times gave the film 3 stars out of 5: "If you want to be tough about it—okay, it's a pretty silly yarn and it is played in a manner no less fatuous by the sundry members of the cast. But Mr. Lang is still a director who knows how to turn the obvious, such as locked doors and silent chambers and roving spotlights, into strangely tingling stuff. And that's why, for all its psycho-nonsense, this film has some mildly creepy spots and some occasional faint resemblance to Rebecca which it was obviously aimed to imitate." Variety called it arty and almost surrealistic. The motivations of the characters were described as occasionally murky.

New York's PM was highly critical: "what they have come up with is an utterly synthetic 'psychological' suspense incredibility wrapped in a gravity so pretentious it is to laugh, wherein all the actors stalk and stare like zombies while the sound track babbles fancy words."

=== Retrospective ===
Jonathan Rosenbaum of the Chicago Reader called the film's murkiness a strength. James Kendrick gives the film 3 stars out of 4, praising the film's surrealism.
