= Panama Sal =

1957 film

- Theatrical release poster
- Directed by: William Witney
- Screenplay by: Arnold Belgard
- Produced by: Edward J. White
- Starring: Elena Verdugo; Ed Kemmer; Carlos Rivas; Harry Jackson; Joe Flynn; Christine White
- Cinematography: Jack A. Marta
- Edited by: Joseph Harrison
- Music by: Joseph Hooven; Marilyn Hooven
- Production company: Republic Pictures
- Distributed by: Republic Pictures
- Release date: October 18, 1957
- Running time: 70 minutes
- Country: United States
- Language: English

Panama Sal is a 1957 American musical comedy film directed by William Witney and written by Arnold Belgard. The film stars Elena Verdugo, Ed Kemmer, Carlos Rivas, Harry Jackson, Joe Flynn and Christine White. The film was released on October 18, 1957 by Republic Pictures.

== Plot ==
Three wealthy American playboys and pals fly to South America for a final fling before one of them, Dennis, is to be married. His fiancee Patricia uses the time to fly to France to have a wedding dress designed by Henri Moray.

The plane runs out of fuel, making a forced landing in the wilds of Panama. There the three men have a chance encounter with a singer, beautiful Sal Regan, who immediately catches Dennis's rapt attention. Claiming to be a music producer, Dennis invites her to return to Los Angeles with him. Although this upsets Manuel Ortego, a jealous man who loves her, Sal decides to settle the matter on the flip of a coin. Dennis wins.

Ensconced in a Beverly Hills apartment, Sal enjoys the trip until Dennis tries to remake her entire image, including wardrobe and makeup, toning it down. A nightclub singing date is arranged and the news makes it abroad to Patricia, who angrily begins a romantic fling with Moray.

Ortego travels to California to demand Sal return to Panama and to confront Dennis, who proposes another wager, that he be given two weeks to make her a star. Patricia also turns up and announces herself to be about to marry Dennis, just to annoy Sal. In the end, though, Sal's debut musical performance is a sensation, and she and Dennis end up in love.

== Cast ==
- Elena Verdugo as Sal Regan
- Ed Kemmer as Dennis P. Dennis
- Carlos Rivas as Manuel Ortego
- Harry Jackson as Peter Van Fleet II
- Joe Flynn as Barrington C. Ashbrook
- Christine White as Patricia Sheldon
- Albert Carrier as Moray
- Jose Gonzales-Gonzales as Peon
- Billie Bird as Woman Manager

== Critical reception ==
In his review of the film on AllMovie, critic Hal Erickson wrote that the film is "not meant to be taken seriously," and that it "is an enjoyable diversion from the waning days of Republic Pictures." A review of the film in TV Guide noted that "Verdugo sings vigorously, but otherwise her performance is lacklustre," that the "script develops slowly and contains insipid dialog," that "the direction is little more than a camera pointed at the action, never adding anything to the proceedings," and that the film "was filmed in black and white with a Naturama processing that falls off around the edges, causing further distraction to an already troubled film."
