= The Ninth Guest =

1934 film by Roy William Neill

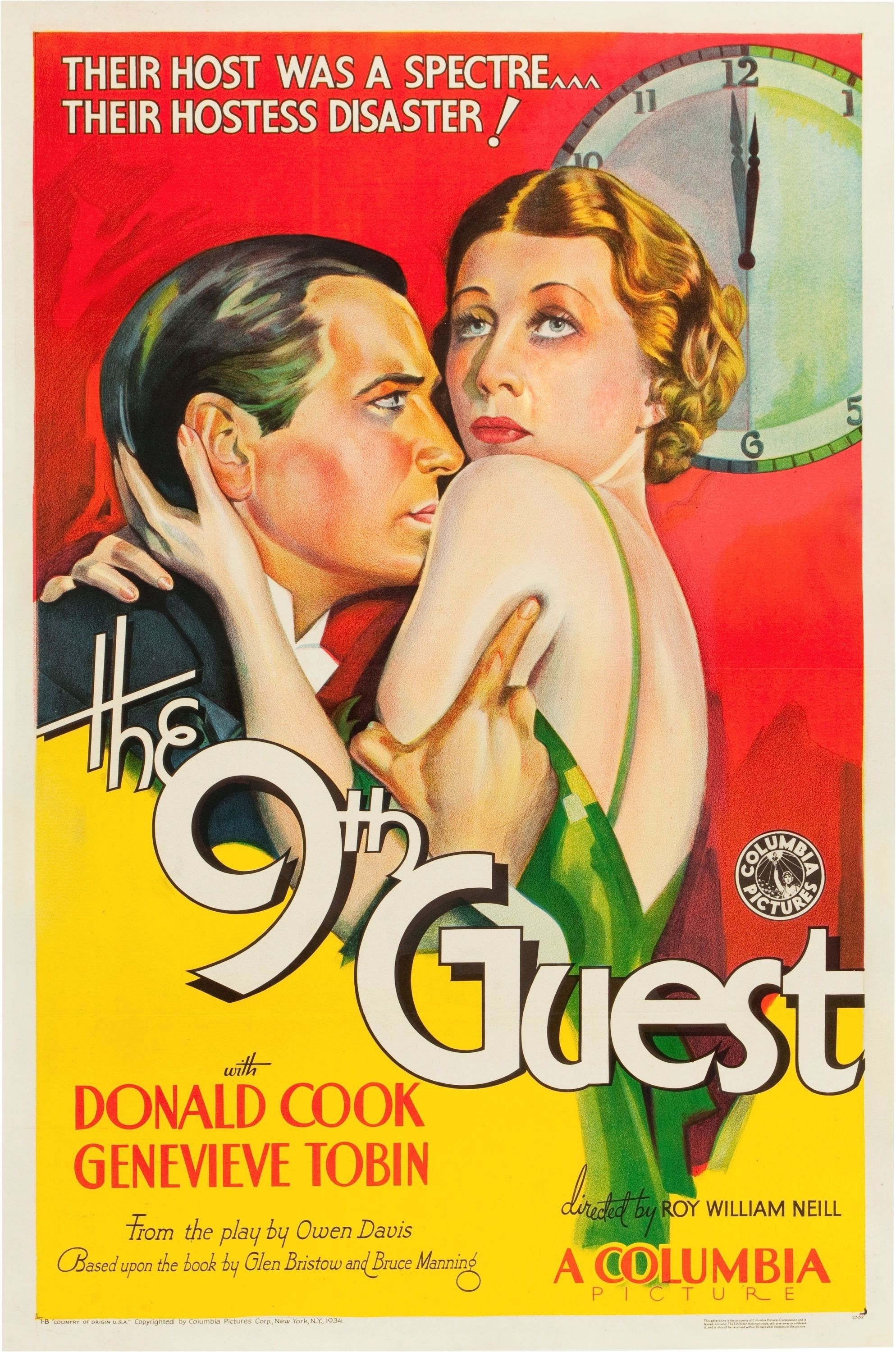
- Original poster art
- Directed by: Roy William Neill
- Written by: Garnet Weston
- Based on: The Ninth Guest by Owen Davis
- Starring: Donald Cook; Genevieve Tobin
- Cinematography: Benjamin H. Kline
- Edited by: Gene Milford
- Production company: Columbia Pictures
- Distributed by: Columbia Pictures
- Release date: February 2, 1934
- Running time: 67 minutes
- Country: United States
- Language: English

The Ninth Guest, sometimes abbreviated as The 9th Guest, is a 1934 American pre-Code horror mystery film directed by Roy William Neill and starring Donald Cook and Genevieve Tobin.

The film is an adaptation of the 1930 Broadway play The Ninth Guest by Owen Davis, which in turn is based on the 1930 novel, The Invisible Host, by Bruce Manning and Gwen Bristow. The book, play and film all predate Agatha Christie's extremely successful 1939 novel And Then There Were None, which has a similar plot.

== Plot ==
A group of guests are invited by telegram to a party at a New Orleans penthouse by an anonymous caller. Among them are professor Murray Reid, campus radical Henry Abbott and his love interest Jean Trent, mob boss Jason Osgood, attorney Sylvia Inglesby, District Attorney Timothy Cronin, socialite Margaret Chisholm, and writer James Daley.

Upon their convergence, the guests find that each are enemies of one another. At the instruction of the anonymous host, a radio broadcasts an announcement that the guests have been brought together for a game of wits that will end in with the "ninth guest" being death itself. Shortly after, the partygoers discover a corpse in a closet. Later in the night, Osgood dies after trying to poison the other guests.

Jean reveals that Margaret recently received a letter exposing her as a bigamist who had her husband wrongly committed to a psychiatric hospital. Margaret, distraught over the exposure, commits suicide at midnight. As the remaining guests argue, it is discovered that Timothy is brandishing a gun. Sylvia attempts to defend Timothy, but involuntary shoots him to death in the process before also killing herself by throwing her body against an electric gate.

At 2:00 a.m., the electricity is cut, leaving the residence in darkness. In the dark, Murray is shot and Henry seriously wounded. James binds the injured Henry, believing him to be the mastermind and killer. James alleges the corpse found in the closet was that of an electrician who wired the apartment for Henry, and surreptitiously allowed him control of the radio via a switch located in Henry's chair. Henry finally admits that he is in fact the mastermind and anonymous caller who brought the group together as part of a revenge plot against Margaret: Margaret's husband was Henry's brother, and Sylvia and the corrupt Timothy aided his brother's commitment to the psychiatric hospital.

After his admission, Henry allows the surviving Jean and James to depart before electrocuting himself to death.

== Cast ==
- Donald Cook as James Daley
- Genevieve Tobin as Jean Trent
- Hardie Albright as Henry Abbott
- Edward Ellis as Tim Cronin
- Edwin Maxwell as Jason Osgood
- Helen Flint as Sylvia Inglesby
- Samuel Hinds as Dr. Murray Reid
- Nella Walker as Margaret Chisholm
- Vince Barnett as Butler (Jones)
- Sidney Bracey as Butler (Hawkins; credited as Sidney Bracy)

== Production ==
The screenplay was written by Garnet Weston, adapted from the Owen Davis play of the same name, which in turn was a stage adaptation of the novel The Invisible Host by Bruce Manning and Gwen Bristow.

== Release ==
The film opened in St. Louis, Missouri on February 2, 1934, and also screened at the Babcock Theatre in Billings, Montana on the same date. It opened in Bangor, Maine on February 15, 1934.

== Reception ==
=== Box office ===
According to a Harrison's Reports article, The Ninth Guest performed "fairly" at the United States box office.

=== Critical response ===
Herbert L. Monk of the St. Louis Globe-Democrat praised the film as "engrossing" and "as bloody as it is clever."

Mordaunt Hall of The New York Times praised the film as "neatly staged, well photographed and contains an adequate amount of slaughter," but felt the plot was too implausible to be considered truly frightening.

== Sources ==
- Pitts, Michael R. (2014). Columbia Pictures Horror, Science Fiction and Fantasy Films, 1928-1982. Jefferson, North Carolina: McFarland. ISBN 978-0-786-45766-3.
