= Gwen Bristow =

American author and journalist (1903–1980)

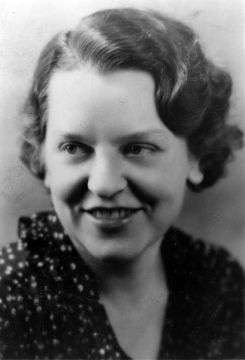
- Gwen Bristow
- Born: September 16, 1903; Marion, South Carolina, United States
- Died: August 17, 1980 (aged 76); New Orleans, Louisiana, United States
- Occupations: Novelist and journalist
- Spouse: Bruce Manning (m. 1929–1965)
- Writing career
- Genres: novel, short story, essays
- Notable works: The Invisible Host (1930); Jubilee Trail (1950)

Gwen Bristow (September 16, 1903 – August 17, 1980) was an American writer and journalist, best known for her tales of the Old South, especially the "Plantation Trilogy." In 1974, she was nominated for the Nobel Prize in Literature.

== Early life ==
Bristow was born in Marion, South Carolina in 1903 to Baptist minister Louis Judson Bristow and Caroline Cornelia Winkler. Bristow became interested in writing while reporting junior high school functions for her local newspaper.

== Education ==
Bristow attended Anderson Baptist College in Anderson, South Carolina, for one year before transferring to Judson College in Marion, Alabama. Bristow disliked the strict rules that Judson imposed on its all-women student population. Students were required to wear uniforms, and they were forbidden from speaking with men or boys during visits downtown. Bristow directed and acted in two plays at Judson, playing the roles of men in both. Bristow was voted "Most Original" in her junior class in 1923.

Bristow graduated from Judson College in 1924 with degrees in English and French. Bristow's parents moved to New Orleans in February of that year.

After college, Bristow set her sights on studying journalism at the Pulitzer School of Journalism at Columbia University. Bristow's parents were unable to support her financially, so Bristow earned money by writing essays for other people, saving enough to purchase the typewriter required for school. Bristow also won a $90 scholarship from Columbia to cover her first semester.

While attending Columbia, Bristow continued to support herself by writing papers for others, working as a nursemaid, typing theses, writing biographies of businessmen for trade journals, and working as a secretary to a Polish baroness on Riverside Drive.

After one year at Columbia Bristow took a summer job with The Times-Picayune in New Orleans. The newspaper offered Bristow a permanent position, and Bristow accepted. She did not return to Columbia.

Bristow kept a journal during her time at Columbia that she later destroyed, observing that she had been a "shrewd and remarkably accurate reporter" of her classmates' "foibles," and "this stuff should not be lying around." "And of course, there was a lot of unintended self-revelation."

== Early career ==
Bristow initially lived with her parents in New Orleans at 4501 Magnolia on the grounds of Southern Baptist Hospital, where Bristow's father had become superintendent. When women in the United States were granted the right to vote by constitutional amendment in 1920, Bristow immediately registered.

Bristow covered the great flood of 1927 for the newspaper and social issues that touched on gender equality, such as the insistence by some brides that "obey" be left out of the marriage ceremony. During a later stint at the paper, Bristow covered the Huey Long assassination. Bristow wrote a letter describing her life as a reporter:

I do regular reporting, which means interviewing convicts, getting descriptions of runaway girls, covering luncheons, writing obituaries of famous citizens and talking to famous actors who come to town. I have met more funny people than I ever knew existed.

At the same time, Bristow was writing poetry, and she published a volume titled The Alien and Other Poems in 1926.

Bristow met another journalist, Bruce Manning, while covering a murder trial, and the pair began to date. They eloped on January 14, 1929, marrying in a civil ceremony in St. Mary Parish, Louisiana. The elopement was intended to avoid objections from Bristow's family to Manning's religion; Bristow was a Baptist, and Manning, a Catholic. The couple lived in a French Quarter apartment at 627 Ursuline Street.

== First publications ==
Bristow published her first novel, The Invisible Host, in 1930. The mystery novel was co-written with Manning. The novel was a success and was adapted into a Broadway play called The Ninth Guest in 1931. Bristow resigned her job with The Times-Picayune. The couple collaborated again on The Gutenberg Murders in 1931. With their newfound success, Bristow and Manning moved to a mansion in the Mississippi Gulfport area.

But the couple was not immune to the Depression that swept the United States. Bristow later wrote: "We were having a wonderful literary life on the coast and in the city when the Depression, which I had heard of but ignored, swooped down upon us and sent us scurrying for shelter." Bristow asked to be rehired at her old job, and in February 1932 she returned to The Times-Picayune.

== Move to Hollywood and literary success ==
RKO Pictures bought the film rights to The Ninth Guest in 1933 and asked Bristow and Manning to write the script. The couple moved to Hollywood and lived briefly at 8231 Fountain Avenue.

In 1934 Manning published a solo novel, Party Wire, and sold the film rights. Bristow had also written several novels on her own, but they were rejected by publishers. Bristow destroyed the manuscripts.

Bristow persevered, and in California began writing what would become her Louisiana plantation novels. Deep Summer (1937), The Handsome Road (1938), and This Side of Glory (1940) are historical novels that follow two Louisiana families over the course of several generations. These novels established Bristow as a popular writer of historical fiction.

Bristow's fame grew, and Manning also enjoyed rising popularity as a director and producer. They befriended Joe Pasternak, Ray Bradbury, Irving Stone, and scriptwriters Pauline and Leo Townsend. Bristow's 1943 novel Tomorrow is Forever was adapted for the screen and made into a movie by Irving Pichel in 1946.

Bristow's next hit was Jubilee Trail (1950) which she wrote over seven years. The novel is set against the backdrop of westward expansion in the 1840s. The protagonist Garnet Hale joins a wagon train bound for California, and the novel offers a fictionalized account of the early Santa Fe trail pioneers. Jubilee Trail was on several bestseller lists for months. A film version, which premiered at the Saenger Theater on Canal Street in New Orleans, was also successful. Furthermore, her books had universal appeal: various ones were translated into German, French, Italian, Norwegian, Danish, Swedish, Finnish, Czech, Slovak, Dutch, Spanish, and Portuguese.

By 1950, the couple lived in the San Fernando Valley. There, Bristow wrote Celia Garth (1959). She continued to write novels and articles for magazines until her death in 1980.

== Health ==
Bristow drank alcohol frequently and at times to excess, and smoked cigarettes. She also followed a careful regimen of one hour's daily exercise spent walking, swimming, or bicycling. Bristow stood 5 feet 4 inches tall. Bristow had plastic surgery in 1937 to affix her ears more closely to her head and had her lashes and eyebrows dyed regularly.

In 1946, Bristow's doctor advised her to stop smoking, and recommended a tonsillectomy. Bristow stopped smoking briefly, but it was not permanent.

Manning died in 1965 after illness and depression. In 1980, Bristow was diagnosed with lung cancer. She died on August 17, 1980.

== Treatment of race and slavery in work ==
Bristow's historical novels, set in the southern United States, included slavery and racial discrimination. According to critics, Bristow took no position on the issue of slavery; Billie Theriot wrote that Bristow did "not deny atrocities," like the sexual exploitation of slaves, and wove the existence of such atrocities into her stories.

== Legacy ==
Bristow was inducted into the Alabama Women's Hall of Fame in 1989. She was also inducted into the South Carolina Academy of Authors in 2000.

Bristow's archives are held at the University of South Carolina.

== Bibliography ==
- The Alien, and Other Poems (1926)
- The Invisible Host (1930), with Bruce Manning, later republished as The Ninth Guest
- The Gutenberg Murders (1931), with Bruce Manning
- The Mardi Gras Murders (1932), with Bruce Manning
- Two and Two Make Twenty-two (1932), with Bruce Manning
- "Plantation Trilogy":
  - Deep Summer (1937), ISBN 0-89966-025-8
  - The Handsome Road (1938), ISBN 0-89966-028-2
  - This Side of Glory (1940), ISBN 0-89966-026-6
- Gwen Bristow (1940), autobiography
- Tomorrow Is Forever (1943), ISBN 0-89966-027-4
- Jubilee Trail (1950), ISBN 1-55652-601-6
- Celia Garth (1959), ISBN 1-877853-58-5
- Calico Palace (1970), ISBN 0-671-82471-6, set in 1848-1851 San Francisco
- From Pigtails to Wedding Bells (1978), ISBN 0-89137-811-1, non-fiction
- Golden Dreams (1980), ISBN 0-690-01678-6
