= Silent Fear =

- Theatrical release poster
- Directed by: Edward L. Cahn
- Screenplay by: Steve Fisher
- Produced by: Edward L. Cahn
- Starring: Andrea King; Peter Adams; Henry Brandon; Malcolm Atterbury; José Treviño; Enrique Zambrano
- Cinematography: Rosalío Solano
- Edited by: Fernando Álvarez
- Music by: Gonzalo Curiel
- Production company: Edward L. Cahn Productions
- Distributed by: Gibraltar Motion Picture Distributors; Monarch Film Corporation (UK)
- Release date: February 8, 1956
- Running time: 66 minutes
- Country: United States
- Language: English

Silent Fear is a 1956 American adventure film directed by Edward L. Cahn and written by Steve Fisher. The film stars Andrea King, Peter Adams, Henry Brandon, Malcolm Atterbury, José Treviño and Enrique Zambrano. The film was released by Gibraltar Motion Picture Distributors Inc. on February 8, 1956.

== Cast ==
- Andrea King as Terry Perreau
- Peter Adams as Pete Carroll
- Henry Brandon as Cliff Sutton
- Malcolm Atterbury as Dr. Vernon
- José Treviño as Ricardo Mendoza
- Enrique Zambrano as Dr. Antez
- Ramón Sánchez as Thursday
- Víctor Alcocer as Cortez
- Charles Rooner as Rudolph
- Carlos Múzquiz as Detective
- Eduardo Alcaraz as Dr. Rivas
- José Muñoz as Manuel
