= Rhythm of the Rio Grande =

- Theatrical release poster
- Directed by: Albert Herman
- Screenplay by: Robert Emmett Tansey
- Produced by: Edward Finney
- Starring: Tex Ritter; Suzan Dale; Warner Richmond; Martin Garralaga; Frank Mitchell; Mike J. Rodriguez
- Cinematography: Marcel Le Picard
- Edited by: Russell F. Schoengarth
- Music by: Frank Sanucci
- Production company: Monogram Pictures
- Distributed by: Monogram Pictures
- Release date: March 2, 1940
- Running time: 53 minutes
- Country: United States
- Language: English

Rhythm of the Rio Grande is a 1940 American Western film directed by Albert Herman and written by Robert Emmett Tansey. The film stars Tex Ritter, Suzan Dale, Warner Richmond, Martin Garralaga, Frank Mitchell and Mike J. Rodriguez. The film was released on March 2, 1940, by Monogram Pictures.

== Cast ==
- Tex Ritter as Tex Regan
- Suzan Dale as Ruth Crane
- Warner Richmond as Buck
- Martin Garralaga as Pablo
- Frank Mitchell as Shorty
- Mike J. Rodriguez as Lopez
- Juan Duval as Rego
- Tris Coffin as Jim Banister
- Chick Hannan as Pete
- Earl Douglas as Blackie
- Forrest Taylor as Edward Crane
- Glenn Strange as Hays
- James McNally as Ransom
