= The Big Sombrero (film) =

1949 film by Frank McDonald

- Theatrical release poster
- Directed by: Frank McDonald
- Screenplay by: Olive Cooper
- Produced by: Armand Schaefer
- Starring: Gene Autry; Champion
- Cinematography: William Bradford
- Edited by: Henry Batista
- Color process: Cinecolor
- Production company: Gene Autry Productions
- Distributed by: Columbia Pictures
- Release date: April 19, 1949
- Running time: 78 minutes
- Country: United States
- Language: English

The Big Sombrero is a 1949 American Western film directed by Frank McDonald and starring Gene Autry and Champion. Written by Olive Cooper, the film is about a singing cowboy hired as foreman of the Big Sombrero ranch by a man working against the interests of the ranch's absentee owner and workers. It was the last of two Autry Columbia films shot in Cinecolor, it was preceded by The Strawberry Roan.

== Plot ==
Singing cowboy Gene Autry (Gene Autry) is out of work and looking for a job. After pawning his guitar, he meets former rodeo sharpshooter Angie Burke (Vera Marshe), who works for wealthy ranch owner Estrellita Estrada (Elena Verdugo). Angie suggests that Gene ride across the border to El Sombrero Grande, Estrellita's ranch. Gene learns that the ranch is managed by James Garland (Stephen Dunne), an acquaintance from their days with Monahan's Wild West Show. Gene heads south into Mexico.

As Gene approaches the ranch, he comes across a fight between Garland and the rancheros, who rent part of the land. Garland is in the process of forcing them off the property. Gene stops Garland from shooting the unarmed men. Garland offers Gene the job of ranch foreman and tells him that he plans to marry Estrellita. On the way back to the ranch, Gene offers a ride to Don Luis Alvarado (William Edmunds), Estrellita's godfather. Don Luis has been hired to replace Felipe Gonzales (Martin Garralaga), who has worked on the ranch all his life. Gene does not want to displace Felipe, but he decides to accept the job in order to help the rancheros, who are led by Juan Vazcaro. Gene hires Felipe as his translator.

Gene travels back to the United States planning to bring Estrellita back to her ranch in Mexico. Angie, who has been accompanying Estrellita in America, opposes Gene's plan, but Gene and Don Luis are able to kidnap Estrellita and drive her back to El Sombrero Grande. Meanwhile, Garland plots to sell the ranch to Ben McBride (Gene Roth). McBride pressures Garland to get rid of the rancheros before they can sell their cattle and pay their back rent. When Gene learns of the plot, he secretly organizes a cattle drive with the rancheros. As Gene and Juan ride to a meeting of the rancheros, they are shot at by one of Garland's men. Gene and Juan capture him and then learn that the other rancheros are under attack.

Although the rancheros are able to fight off Garland's men, a young boy named Tico accidentally reveals to Garland the plans for Gene's cattle drive. Meanwhile, Gene encourages Estrellita to take an interest in her ranch, but she is still eager to return to the United States. After the rancheros leave on the cattle drive, Garland and McBride ambush them at a mountain pass. During the gunfight, the young boy Tico is killed. The rancheros bring the boy's body back to the ranch. Garland professes his innocence, but Estrellita now knows his real intentions and orders him to leave the country. She then asks Gene to help her learn to care for the ranch. Sometime later, after Estrellita absolves the rancheros' debts, Gene leaves Mexico, but promises to return.

== Cast ==
- Gene Autry as Gene Autry
- Champion as Champ
- Elena Verdugo as Estrellita Estrada
- Stephen Dunne as Jimmy Garland
- George J. Lewis as Juan Vazcaro
- Vera Marshe as Angie Burke
- William Edmunds as Don Luis Alvarado
- Martin Garralaga as Felipe Gonzales (as Gene Stutenroth)
- Gene Roth as Ben McBride
- Neyle Morrow as Tico

== Production ==
=== Filming locations ===
- Santa Clarita, California, USA
- Tucson, Arizona, USA
- Vasquez Rocks, Vasquez Rocks Natural Area Park, 10700 W. Escondido Canyon Road, Agua Dulce, California, USA
- Corriganville Movie Ranch, Simi Valley, California, USA
- Monogram Ranch, 24715 Oak Creek Avenue, Placerita Canyon, Santa Clarita, California, USA
- Rancho Maria, 25933 Sand Canyon Road, Bear Gap, Canyon Country, California, USA
- Red Rock Canyon State Park, Highway 14, Cantil, California, USA
- Starr Pass, Tucson, Arizona, USA

=== Soundtrack ===
- "You Belong to My Heart" (Augustin Lara, Ray Gilbert) by Gene Autry
- "La Golondrina" (N. Serredell, Teddy Powell) by Elena Verdugo (dancing)
- "Rancho Pillow" (Allie Rubel, Charles Newman) by Gene Autry
- "My Adobe Hacienda" (Louise Massey, Lee Penny) by Gene Autry
- "Goodbye to Old Mexico" (Dwight Butcher, Billy Johnson, James Brockman) by Gene Autry
- "I'm Thankful for Small Favors" (Smiley Burnette) by Gene Autry
- "Oh, My Darlin' Clementine" (Arrangement by Percy Montrose) by Gene Autry
- "Trail to Mexico" (Johnny Lange, Lew Porter) by Gene Autry

== See also ==
- Public domain film
- List of American films of 1949
- List of films in the public domain in the United States
