= Jubilee Trail (film) =

1954 film by Joseph Kane

- Theatrical release poster
- Directed by: Joseph Kane
- Screenplay by: Bruce Manning (based on the novel by Gwen Bristow)
- Produced by: Joseph Kane
- Starring: Vera Ralston; Joan Leslie; Forrest Tucker; John Russell; Ray Middleton; Pat O'Brien
- Cinematography: Jack A. Marta
- Edited by: Richard L. Van Enger
- Music by: Victor Young
- Color process: Trucolor
- Production company: Republic Pictures
- Distributed by: Republic Pictures
- Release date: January 15, 1954
- Running time: 103 minutes
- Country: United States
- Language: English
- Box office: $1.3 million

Jubilee Trail is a 1954 American Western film directed by Joseph Kane, starring Vera Ralston, Joan Leslie, Forrest Tucker, John Russell, Ray Middleton, and Pat O'Brien.

== Plot ==
In 1845, trader Oliver Hale and his new wife are returning from New York to California. In a New Orleans music hall they meet and befriend an entertainer who uses the stage name of Florinda Grove. The dance hall singer is actually on the run from the New York police since she's wanted for a murder she claims to be innocent of. The Hales believe her story and help her escape the city under the guise of a widow bound for St. Louis on a riverboat. The newlyweds themselves reach New Mexico where they plan to join a wagon train bound for California. In Santa Fe, the Hales bump into entertainer Florinda again. While Oliver Hale is away on a short business trip, a messenger from his brother Charles Hale arrives in town, bringing a special letter from Charles. In the letter, Charles explains that Carmelita Velasco, the daughter of a wealthy landowner, claims to be pregnant with Oliver's child and that she and her family expect Oliver to do the right honorable thing and marry her. But, alas, the letter reaches Oliver too late since he's now already married to New Yorker Garnet. By refusing to marry Carmelita, Oliver risks offending the whole Velasco family. To make matters worse, the dowry of Carmelita Velasco consists of a large Spanish land tract that Charles Hale covets. Days later, Oliver Hale, his wife Garnet and their new friend Florinda join a wagon train destined for Los Angeles. How will Oliver get out of this tight spot and conciliate his family with the Velasco family while preserving their honor?

== Cast ==
- Vera Ralston as Florinda Grove / Julie Latour
- Joan Leslie as Garnet Hale
- Forrest Tucker as John Ives
- John Russell as Oliver Hale
- Ray Middleton as Charles Hale
- Pat O'Brien as Ernest "Texas" Conway
- Buddy Baer as Nicolai Gregorovitch Karakozeff "Handsome Brute"
- Jim Davis as "Silky"
- Barton MacLane as Deacon Bartlett
- Richard Webb as Captain Brown
- James Millican as Rinardi
- Nina Varela as Doña Manuela
- Martin Garralaga as Don Rafael Velasco
- Charles Stevens as Pablo
- Jack Elam as "Whitey"
