= Bruce Manning =

American novelist (1902–1965)

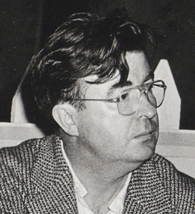
- Born: July 15, 1902; Cuddebackville, New York, U.S.
- Died: August 3, 1965 (aged 63); Encino, California, U.S.
- Spouse: Gwen Bristow (1929–1965)

Bruce Manning (July 15, 1902 – August 3, 1965) was a Cuddebackville, New York-born Hollywood filmmaker/screenwriter who entered the movie business following the publication of several novels that he co-wrote with wife, Gwen Bristow. Their first joint novel, The Invisible Host (1930), was adapted to the screen in 1934 as The Ninth Guest.

He wrote the screenplay for Bristow's novel Jubilee Trail in 1954. In addition to his numerous scripts, beginning in the 1940s he served as a producer for several films, and in 1943 he directed his first and only feature, The Amazing Mrs. Holliday. His career ended in 1957, eight years before his death.

Henry Koster called him "the funniest man I ever met and the best comedy writer I ever met."

== Death ==
Manning died in Encino, California in 1965 at the age of 63.

== Partial filmography ==
As screenwriter unless otherwise noted.

- The Ninth Guest (1934)
- Party Wire (1935) (novel)
- The Best Man Wins (1935)
- Eight Bells (1935)
- The Lone Wolf Returns (1935)
- Counterfeit (1936)
- Devil's Squadron (1936)
- One Hundred Men and a Girl (1937)
- Mad About Music (1938)
- The Rage of Paris (1938) (also story)
- That Certain Age (1938)
- Service de Luxe (1938) (story)
- Three Smart Girls Grow Up (1939)
- First Love (1939)
- Spring Parade (1940)
- Back Street (1941)
- Appointment for Love (1941)
- Broadway (1942) (adaptation)
- The Amazing Mrs. Holliday (1943) (director and producer)
- Guest Wife (1945)
- This Love of Ours (1945)
- So Goes My Love (1946)
- That Midnight Kiss (1949)
- Bride for Sale (1949)
- The Secret Fury (1950) (producer)
- Payment on Demand (1951)
- Hoodlum Empire (1952)
- Flame of the Islands (1956)
