= Song of the Gringo =

1936 film by John P. McCarthy

- Film poster
- Directed by: John P. McCarthy
- Written by: John P. McCarthy (story) and Robert Emmett Tansey (story) and Wellyn Totman (story); John P. McCarthy (screenplay) and Robert Emmett Tansey (screenplay) and Al J. Jennings (screenplay)
- Produced by: Edward Finney
- Starring: Tex Ritter; Monte Blue; Fuzzy Knight
- Cinematography: Gus Peterson
- Edited by: Frederick Bain
- Music by: Frank Sanucci
- Color process: Black and white
- Production companies: Boots and Saddles Pictures
- Distributed by: Grand National Pictures
- Release date: November 22, 1936
- Running time: 62 minutes
- Country: United States
- Language: English

Song of the Gringo is a 1936 American Western film directed by John P. McCarthy. The film is also known as The Old Corral in the United Kingdom. The film was the debut of singing cowboy Tex Ritter. It was co-written by former outlaw and judge Al Jennings who appears as a judge in the film.

== Plot ==
An undercover Texas Ranger infiltrates a hacienda to identify and bring to justice a gang using murder to steal mineral mines.

== Cast ==
- Tex Ritter as Tex
- Joan Woodbury as Lolita Maria Dolores Del Valle
- Fuzzy Knight as Slim Zony
- Monte Blue as Sheriff
- Ted Adams as Evans
- Warner Richmond as Henchman 'Cherokee'
- Al J. Jennings as Judge
- Martin Garralaga as Don Esteban Valle
- William Desmond as Bailiff
- Forrest Taylor as Prosecuting Attorney
- Robert Fiske as Defense Attorney
- Rosa Rey as Rosita (the maid)
- José Pacheco as Orchestra Leader

== Soundtrack ==
- "Out on the Old Prairie" (by Tex Ritter)
- "My Sweet Chiquita" (by Tex Ritter)
- "Sam Hall" (by Tex Ritter)
- "Rye Whiskey" (by Tex Ritter)
- "You Are Reality" (Written by Joan Woodbury)
