= Saved by the Belle =

1939 film by Charley Chase

- Directed by: Charley Chase
- Written by: Searle Kramer; Elwood Ullman
- Produced by: Charley Chase; Hugh McCollum
- Starring: Moe Howard; Larry Fine; Curly Howard; LeRoy Mason; Carmen Laroux; Gino Corrado; Vernon Dent; Manuel París; Al Thompson
- Cinematography: Allen G. Siegler
- Edited by: Art Seid
- Distributed by: Columbia Pictures
- Release date: June 30, 1939 (U.S.)
- Running time: 17:22
- Country: United States
- Language: English

Saved by the Belle is a 1939 short subject directed by Charley Chase starring American slapstick comedy team The Three Stooges (Moe Howard, Larry Fine and Curly Howard). It is the 40th entry in the series released by Columbia Pictures starring the comedians, who released 190 shorts for the studio between 1934 and 1959.

== Plot ==
The Stooges are itinerant salesmen in the fictional South American country of Valeska, described as a "thriving kingdom in the tropics." Although frequent earthquakes barely disrupt the tranquility of the town, a latent revolutionary fervor simmers beneath the surface. The leader of the burgeoning rebellion, coincidentally the proprietor of the inn where the Stooges are lodged, decides to close the establishment. When the trio cannot pay their bill, they make a hasty escape but are arrested soon after for peddling without a license.

The Stooges are brought before a military official who mistakes them for spies and sentences them to be shot at sunrise. During their stay in jail, the Stooges befriend Señorita Rita, a revolutionary sympathizer, who helps them escape. Rita provides the trio with a map of the president's palace and instructs them to deliver it to the revolutionary leader. During the tumult of a subsequent earthquake, the Stooges fumble the map and unknowingly proceed to the rebel leader's headquarters carrying a rolled calendar in its place. They are sentenced to be shot for bringing the wrong plans, but an earthquake disrupts their execution and the trio escape in a dynamite truck. However, their escape is short-lived as Curly's careless disposal of a lit match precipitates the detonation of the truck. The trio are propelled by the blast onto the back of a horse, but before they can ride away their journey is abruptly halted by an ignominious tumble to the ground.

== Production notes ==
Saved by the Belle was filmed on December 12–15, 1938. The film title is a play on the boxing expression "saved by the bell." It was the final Three Stooges short to be directed by veteran comedian Charley Chase, who died of a heart attack on June 20, 1940.

When the Stooges introduce themselves to the rebels upon their arrival, Moe is heard saying "Hello, doh!" This line is from the Stooges' "Maharaja" routine, which would be performed in future films Time Out for Rhythm, Three Little Pirates and The Three Stooges Go Around the World in a Daze.

When the Stooges are in front of the firing squad, believing they are to get their picture taken, Curly poses and says to Moe "I'm gonna send one home to Elaine". This is a reference to his then-wife Elaine Ackerman, whom he was married to from 1937 to 1940.

Curly almost laughs and breaks character when the team lands on the horse at the end of the short.
