= List of mystery films =

A mystery film is a genre of film revolving around the solution to a problem or a crime. It focuses on the efforts of a protagonist to solve the mystery by means of clues, investigation, and deduction.

This is a list of mystery films by decade.

== 1910s ==
- Sherlock Holmes (1916)
- Seven Keys to Baldpate (1917)

== 1920s ==
- Sherlock Holmes (1922)
- The Man from Beyond (1922)
- The Cat and the Canary (1927)
- The Lodger (1927)
- The Canary Murder Case (1929)
- The Greene Murder Case (1929)
- The Letter (1929)
- The Studio Murder Mystery (1929)

== 1930s ==
- The Bat Whispers (1930)
- The Benson Murder Case (1930)
- The Bishop Murder Case (1930)
- The Return of Dr. Fu Manchu (1930)
- The Black Camel (1931)
- Daughter of the Dragon (1931)
- The Maltese Falcon (1931)
- Mary (1931)
- The Sleeping Cardinal (1931)
- The Speckled Band (1931)
- Arsène Lupin (1932)
- Doctor X (1932)
- The Death Kiss (1932)
- The Lodger (1932)
- The Old Dark House (1932)
- The Phantom of Crestwood (1932)
- Sherlock Holmes (1932)
- The Sign of Four (1932)
- Thirteen Women (1932)
- A Study in Scarlet (1933)
- Mystery of the Wax Museum (1933)
- The Kennel Murder Case (1933)
- Lord Edgware Dies (1934)
- The Case of the Howling Dog (1934)
- Charlie Chan in London (1934)
- The Dragon Murder Case (1934)
- The Man Who Knew Too Much (1934)
- The Thin Man (1934)
- The 39 Steps (1935)
- The Case of the Curious Bride (1935)
- The Case of the Lucky Legs (1935)
- The Casino Murder Case (1935)
- Charlie Chan in Egypt (1935)
- Charlie Chan in Paris (1935)
- Charlie Chan in Shanghai (1935)
- The Glass Key (1935)
- The Mystery of Edwin Drood (1935)
- Remember Last Night? (1935)
- The Spanish Cape Mystery (1935), first Ellery Queen film
- The Triumph of Sherlock Holmes (1935)
- After the Thin Man (1936)
- The Case of the Black Cat (1936)
- The Case of the Velvet Claws (1936)
- Charlie Chan at the Circus (1936)
- Charlie Chan at the Opera (1936)
- Charlie Chan at the Race Track (1936)
- Charlie Chan's Secret (1936)
- The Garden Murder Case (1936)
- Murder on a Bridle Path (1936)
- The Plot Thickens (1936)
- The Preview Murder Mystery (1936)
- Satan Met a Lady (1936)
- Secret Agent (1936)
- The Case of the Stuttering Bishop (1937)
- The Hound of the Baskervilles (1937)
- The Man Who Was Sherlock Holmes (1937)
- Night of Mystery (1937)
- Silver Blaze (1937)
- Charlie Chan at the Olympics (1937)
- Charlie Chan on Broadway (1937)
- Young and Innocent (1937)
- Arsène Lupin Returns (1938)
- Charlie Chan at Monte Carlo (1938)
- The Lady Vanishes (1938)
- The Mad Miss Manton (1938)
- Mr. Moto's Gamble (1938)
- Mr. Wong, Detective (1938)
- Mysterious Mr. Moto (1938)
- Nancy Drew... Detective (1938)
- The Saint in New York (1938)
- Tom Sawyer, Detective (1938)
- The Adventures of Sherlock Holmes (1939)
- The Arsenal Stadium Mystery (1939)
- The Cat and the Canary (1939)
- The Gracie Allen Murder Case (1939)
- The Hound of the Baskervilles (1939)
- Mystery of Mr. Wong (1939)
- Nancy Drew and the Hidden Staircase (1939)
- Nancy Drew... Reporter (1939)
- Nancy Drew… Trouble Shooter (1939)
- The Saint Strikes Back (1939)

== 1940s ==
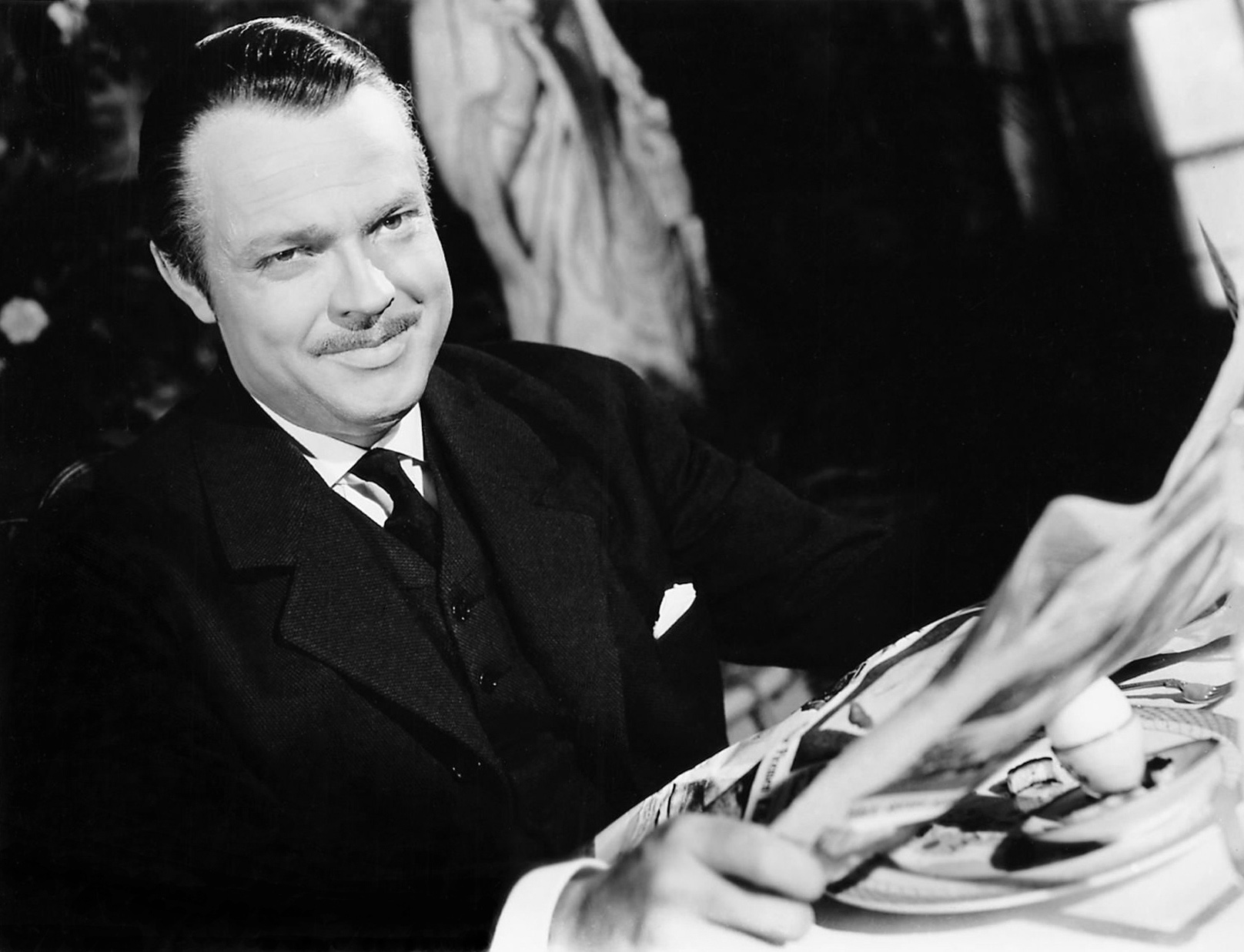
An image from Citizen Kane

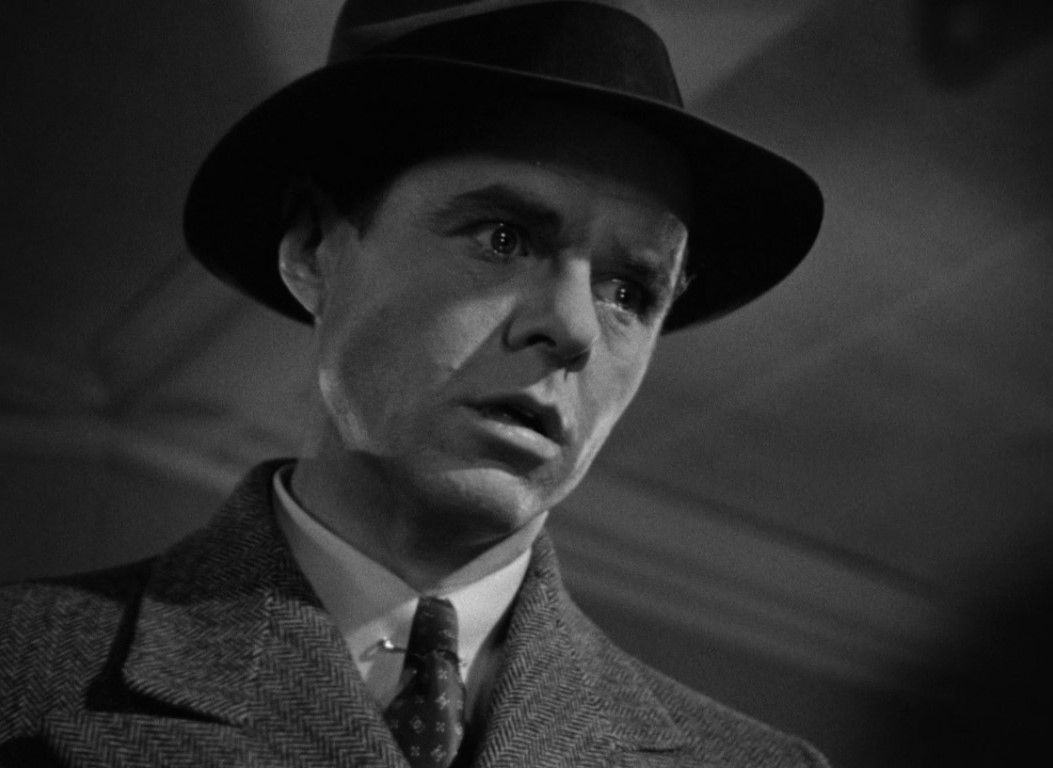
An image from The Maltese Falcon

- Calling Philo Vance (1940)
- Gaslight (1940)
- The Letter (1940)
- Rebecca (1940)
- The Black Cat (1941)
- Citizen Kane (1941)
- Footsteps in the Dark (1941)
- The Gay Falcon (1941)
- The Ghost Train (1941)
- The Maltese Falcon (1941)
- Shadow of the Thin Man (1941)
- Shadows on the Stairs (1941)
- Suspicion (1941)
- Topper Returns (1941)
- Eyes in the Night (1942)
- The Falcon Takes Over (1942)
- The Falcon's Brother (1942)
- The Glass Key (1942)
- Saboteur (1942)
- Sherlock Holmes and the Secret Weapon (1942)
- The Voice of Terror (1942)
- Shadow of a Doubt (1943)
- Sherlock Holmes Faces Death (1943)
- Sherlock Holmes in Washington (1943)
- Christmas Holiday (1944)
- Gaslight (1944)
- Laura (1944)
- The Lodger (1944)
- Murder, My Sweet (1944)
- The Pearl of Death (1944), Sherlock Holmes
- Phantom Lady (1944)
- The Scarlet Claw (1944), Sherlock Holmes
- The Spider Woman (1944)
- The Suspect (1944)
- And Then There Were None (1945)
- Hangover Square (1945)
- The Hidden Eye (1945)
- The Thin Man Goes Home (1945)
- Pursuit to Algiers (1945)
- The House of Fear (1945)
- Spellbound (1945)
- The Woman in Green (1945), Sherlock Holmes
- The Big Sleep (1946)
- The Blue Dahlia (1946)
- The Dark Corner (1946)
- Dressed to Kill (1946), Sherlock Holmes
- She-Wolf of London (1946)
- The Spiral Staircase (1946)
- The Stranger (1946)
- The Strange Woman (1946)
- Terror by Night (1946), Sherlock Holmes
- Crossfire (1947)
- Fear in the Night (1947)
- Johnny O'Clock (1947)
- The Lady from Shanghai (1947)
- Lady in the Lake (1947)
- Lured (1947)
- Out of the Past (1947)
- Philo Vance Returns (1947)
- Song of the Thin Man (1947)
- The Unfaithful (1947)
- They Won't Believe Me (1947)
- The Big Clock (1948), remade as No Way Out (1987)
- Rope (1948)
- Sleep, My Love (1948)
- Sorry Wrong Number (1948)
- Alias Nick Beal (1949)
- D.O.A. (1949)
- The Lady Gambles (1949)
- Manhandled (1949)
- The Third Man (1949)
- Too Late for Tears (1949)

== 1950s ==
- Mystery Street (1950)
- Stage Fright (1950)
- Union Station (1950)
- Strangers on a Train (1951)
- Phone Call from a Stranger (1952)
- A Blueprint for Murder (1953)
- The Blue Gardenia (1953)
- House of Wax (1953)
- Man in the Attic (1953)
- The Glass Web (1953)
- The Long Wait (1954)
- Rear Window (1954)
- Kiss Me Deadly (1955)
- Mr. Arkadin (1955)
- Julie (1956)
- The Man Who Knew Too Much (1956)
- 23 Paces to Baker Street (1956)
- My Gun Is Quick (1957)
- Witness for the Prosecution (1957)
- Vertigo (1958)
- The Hound of the Baskervilles (1959)
- The 39 Steps (1959)
- North by Northwest (1959)
- The Scapegoat (1959)

== 1960s ==
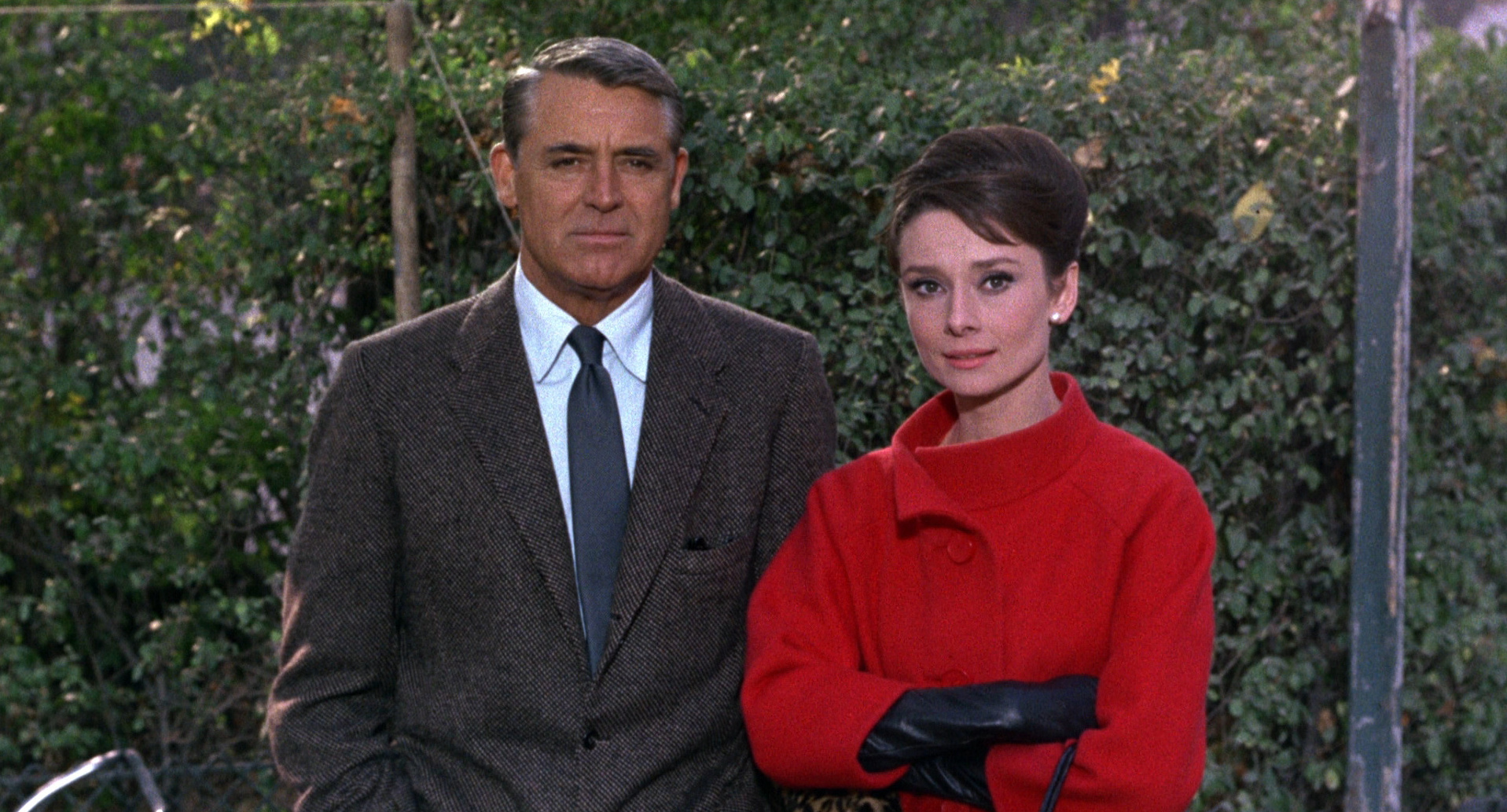
An image from Charade

- Psycho (1960)
- Midnight Lace (1960)
- Murder, She Said (1961)
- The Manchurian Candidate (1962)
- Sherlock Holmes and the Deadly Necklace (1962)
- The Trial (1962)
- The Birds (1963)
- Charade (1963)
- The Girl Hunters (1963)
- The List of Adrian Messenger (1963)
- The Old Dark House (1963)
- Murder at the Gallop (1963)
- The Pink Panther (1963)
- Marnie (1964)
- Murder Most Foul (1964)
- The Moon-Spinners (1964)
- Murder Ahoy! (1964)
- A Shot in the Dark (1964)
- The Third Secret (1964)
- The Alphabet Murders (1965)
- Alphaville (1965)
- A Study in Terror (1965)
- Sylvia (1965)
- Ten Little Indians (1965)
- That Darn Cat! (1965)
- The Third Day (1965)
- Blowup (1966)
- Berserk! (1967)
- Athey Kangal (1967)
- The Champagne Murders (1967)
- Gunn (1967)
- In the Heat of the Night (1967)
- Tony Rome (1967)
- Wait Until Dark (1967)
- Warning Shot (1967)
- Bullitt (1968)
- The Detective (1968)
- Inspector Clouseau (1968)
- Jigsaw (1968)
- Lady in Cement (1968)
- Madigan (1968)
- No Way to Treat a Lady (1968)
- P.J. (1968)
- The Big Bounce (1969)
- Marlowe (1969)

== 1970s ==
- Darker than Amber (1970)
- The Private Life of Sherlock Holmes (1970)
- The Cat o' Nine Tails (1971)
- Gumshoe (1971)
- Klute (1971)
- Pretty Maids All in a Row (1971)
- The Carey Treatment (1972)
- Hickey & Boggs (1972)
- Frenzy (1972)
- Pulp (1972)
- Sleuth (1972)
- They Only Kill Their Masters (1972)
- Electra Glide in Blue (1973)
- The Last of Sheila (1973)
- The Legend of Hell House (1973)
- The Long Goodbye (1973)
- Shamus (1973)
- Chinatown (1974)
- The Conversation (1974)
- The Midnight Man (1974)
- Murder on the Orient Express (1974)
- Who Killed Lamb? (1974)
- The Adventure of Sherlock Holmes' Smarter Brother (1975)
- The Black Bird (1975)
- Escape to Witch Mountain (1975)
- Farewell, My Lovely (1975)
- The Legend of Lizzie Borden (1975)
- Night Moves (1975)
- One of Our Dinosaurs Is Missing (1975)
- The Return of the Pink Panther (1975)
- The Drowning Pool (1976)
- Family Plot (1976)
- Murder by Death (1976)
- The Pink Panther Strikes Again (1976)
- The Seven Percent Solution (1976)
- Sherlock Holmes in New York (1976)
- High Anxiety (1977)
- The Late Show (1977)
- The Strange Case of the End of Civilization as We Know It (1977)
- The Big Sleep (1978)
- The Cheap Detective (1978)
- Death on the Nile (1978)
- Eyes of Laura Mars (1978)
- The Hound of the Baskervilles (1978)
- Return from Witch Mountain (1978)
- Revenge of the Pink Panther (1978)
- The 39 Steps (1978)
- Murder by Decree (1979)
- The North Avenue Irregulars (1979)
- Who Is Killing the Great Chefs of Europe? (1978)

== 1980s ==
- Cruising (1980)
- Dressed to Kill (1980)
- The Fog (1980)
- The Mirror Crack'd (1980)
- The Shining (1980)
- The Watcher in the Woods (1980)
- Blow Out (1981)
- Body Heat (1981)
- Cutter's Way (1981)
- The Great Muppet Caper (1981)
- Shock Treatment (1981)
- Strange Behavior (1981)
- True Confessions (1981)
- Blade Runner (1982)
- Deathtrap (1982)
- Evil Under the Sun (1982)
- I, the Jury (1982)
- The Thing (1982)
- Trail of the Pink Panther (1982)
- Witness for the Prosecution (1982)
- Curse of the Pink Panther (1983)
- Gorky Park (1983)
- Hammett (1983)
- The Fourth Man (1983 film)
- Strange Invaders (1983)
- Against All Odds (1984), remake of Out of the Past
- Body Double (1984)
- Ordeal by Innocence (1984)
- A Soldier's Story (1984)
- Tightrope (1984)
- Clue (1985)
- Compromising Positions (1985)
- Jagged Edge (1985)
- Blue Velvet (film) (1986)
- The Great Mouse Detective (1986)
- Manhunter (1986)
- The Morning After (1986)
- The Name of the Rose (1986)
- Young Sherlock Holmes (1986)
- Angel Heart (1987)
- Black Widow (1987)
- No Way Out (1987), remake of The Big Clock (1948)
- The Rosary Murders (1987)
- The Stepford Children (1987)
- Tough Guys Don't Dance (1987)
- Appointment with Death (1988)
- The Dead Pool (1988)
- Masquerade (1988)
- Moving Target (1988)
- The Presidio (1988)
- Shakedown (1988)
- Sunset (1988)
- Who Framed Roger Rabbit (1988)
- Sea of Love (1989)

== 1990s ==
- Dick Tracy (1990)
- In the Spirit (1990)
- Presumed Innocent (1990)
- The Two Jakes (1990)
- Backdraft (1991)
- Cast a Deadly Spell (1991)
- Homicide (1991)
- Popcorn (1991)
- Shattered (1991)
- Under Suspicion (1991)
- V.I. Warshawski (1991)
- Basic Instinct (1992)
- Shadows and Fog (1992)
- White Sands (1992)
- Zipperface (1992)
- Body of Evidence (1993)
- The Good Son (1993)
- Manhattan Murder Mystery (1993)
- Rising Sun (1993)
- Sliver (1993)
- Son of the Pink Panther (1993)
- Striking Distance (1993)
- The Wrong Trousers (1993)
- Blink (1994)
- Clean Slate (1994)
- Color of Night (1994)
- Felidae (1994)
- Radioland Murders (1994)
- A Close Shave (1995)
- Devil in a Blue Dress (1995)
- Jade (1995)
- Money Train (1995)
- Seven (1995), a.k.a. Se7en
- Sudden Death (1995)
- The Usual Suspects (1995)
- The Chamber (1996)
- City Hall (1996)
- Courage Under Fire (1996)
- Heaven's Prisoners (1996)
- Lone Star (1996)
- Mulholland Falls (1996)
- Primal Fear (1996)
- Scream (1996)
- Unforgettable (1996)
- Cube (1997)
- The Devil's Advocate (1997)
- Kiss the Girls (1997)
- L.A. Confidential (1997)
- Murder at 1600 (1997)
- The Spanish Prisoner (1997)
- That Darn Cat (1997)
- Dark City (1998)
- Killers in the House (1998)
- Rear Window (1998)
- Shadow of Doubt (1998)
- Twilight (1998)
- Wild Things (1998)
- Zero Effect (1998)
- 8mm (film) (1998)
- Ring (1998)
- A Murder of Crows (film) (1999)
- The Blair Witch Project (1999)
- The Bone Collector (1999)
- Eyes Wide Shut (1999)
- The General's Daughter (1999)
- The Omega Code (1999)
- Sleepy Hollow (1999)

== 2000s ==
- Book of Shadows: Blair Witch 2 (2000)
- Memento (2000)
- Mercy (2000)
- Under Suspicion (2000)
- What Lies Beneath (2000)
- Along Came a Spider (2001)
- The Cat's Meow (2001)
- Close Your Eyes (2001)
- From Hell (2001)
- Gosford Park (2001)
- Hannibal (2001)
- Harry Potter and the Sorcerer's Stone (2001)
- Megiddo: The Omega Code 2 (2001)
- The Pledge (2001)
- Blood Work (2002)
- Ghost Ship (2002)
- Insomnia (2002)
- Minority Report (2002)
- Mulholland Drive (2002)
- Red Dragon (2002)
- The Ring (2002)
- The Truth About Charlie (2002)
- Basic (2003)
- Brotherhood of the Wolf (2003)
- Identity (2003)
- In the Cut (2003)
- Memories of Murder (2003)
- Mystic River (2003)
- Out of Time (2003)
- The Reckoning (2003)
- The Singing Detective (2003)
- The Machinist (2004)
- The Manchurian Candidate (2004)
- The Perfect Husband: The Laci Peterson Story (2004)
- Brick (2005)
- Hide and Seek (2005)
- Flightplan (2005)
- Kiss Kiss Bang Bang (2005), from Brett Halliday's 1941 Michael Shayne novel, Bodies Are Where You Find Them
- Wallace & Gromit: The Curse of the Were-Rabbit (2005)
- Basic Instinct 2 (2006)
- The Black Dahlia (2006)
- The Da Vinci Code (2006)
- The Dead Girl (2006)
- Hollywoodland (2006)
- Tell No One (2006)
- The Alphabet Killer (2007)
- Gone Baby Gone (2007)
- I Know Who Killed Me (2007)
- In the Valley of Elah (2007)
- The Lookout (2007)
- Nancy Drew (2007)
- The Number 23 (2007)
- Perfect Stranger (2007)
- Thr3e (2007)
- Someone Behind You (2007)
- Vacancy (2007)
- Doubt (2008)
- The Oxford Murders (2008)
- Righteous Kill (2008)
- Transsiberian (2008)
- Wallace & Gromit: A Matter of Loaf and Death (2008)
- Angels & Demons (2009)
- The Girl with the Dragon Tattoo (2009)
- The Secret in Their Eyes (2009)
- Sherlock Holmes (2009)
- State of Play (2009)
- The Uninvited (2009)

== 2010s ==
- The Ghost Writer (2010)
- Incendies (2010)
- Iron Doors (2010)
- Shanghai (2010)
- Shutter Island (2010)
- Thomas & Friends: Misty Island Rescue (2010)
- The Girl with the Dragon Tattoo (2011)
- Harry Potter and the Deathly Hallows – Part 2 (2011)
- Sherlock Holmes: A Game of Shadows (2011)
- Unknown (2011)
- Segunda Mano (2011)
- Jack Reacher (2012)
- The Raven (2012)
- Sinister (2012)
- Broken City (2013)
- The Call (2013)
- Prisoners (2013)
- Side Effects (2013)
- Altar (2014)
- Big Hero 6 (2014)
- Gone Girl (2014)
- Veronica Mars (2014)
- Brimstone (2015)
- Crimson Peak (2015)
- Eiga ST Aka to Shirō no Sōsa File (2015)
- The Hateful Eight (2015)
- Pod (2015)
- Sicario (2015)
- Solomon's Perjury Part 1: Suspicion (2015)
- Solomon's Perjury Part 2: Judgement (2015)
- I Am Not a Serial Killer (2016)
- Zootopia (2016)
- Inferno (2016)
- Blade Runner 2049 (2017)
- Coco (2017)
- The Covenant (2017)
- Get Out (2017)
- Wind River (2017)
- Murder on the Orient Express (2017)
- Debunkers, Inc. (2019)
- Knives Out (2019)
- Murder Mystery (2019)
- I See You (2019)

== 2020s ==
- The Bloodhound (2020)
- The Invisible Man (2020)
- Friend of the World (2020)
- Enola Holmes (2020)
- Enola Holmes 2 (2022)
- Glass Onion: A Knives Out Mystery (2022)
- Death on the Nile (2022)
- Marlowe (2022)
- Shelby Oaks (2024)
- Wake Up Dead Man (2025)
- Lifeline (2025)
- The Housemaid (2025)
