= Pat West (actor) =

American actor

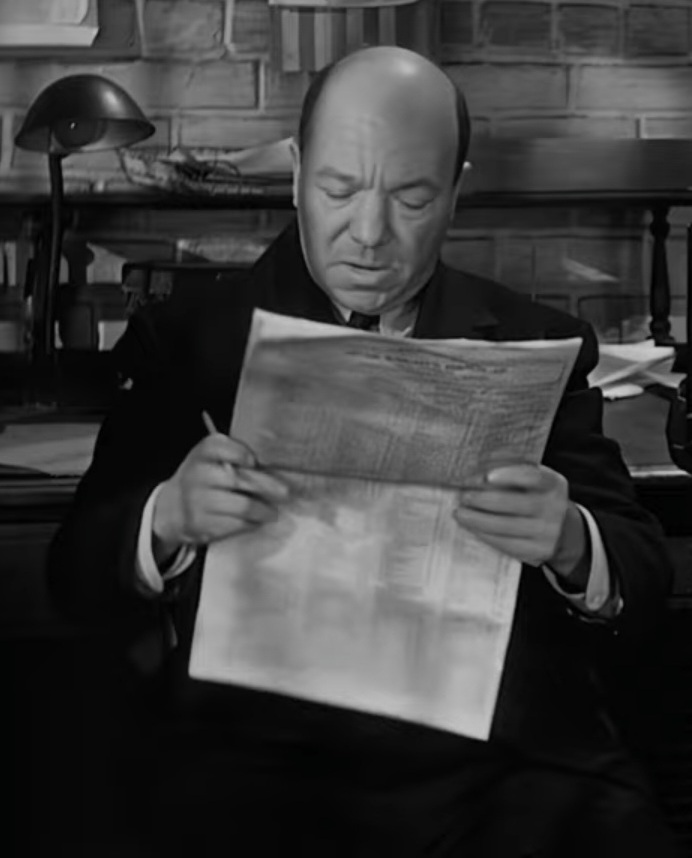
- West in His Girl Friday (1940)
- Born: Arthur Pat West; April 19, 1888; Paducah, Kentucky, U.S.
- Died: April 10, 1944 (aged 55)
- Occupation: Film actor
- Years active: 1928–1945

Arthur Pat West (April 19, 1888 – April 10, 1944), born in Paducah, Kentucky, was an American character actor. He had a very bit parts in over 100 films from 1928 to 1945. Among his notable film credits, sometimes uncredited or credited roles, include Page Miss Glory (1935), Rose Marie (1936), Bringing Up Baby (1938), Only Angels Have Wings (1939), The Bank Dick (1940), His Girl Friday (1940), My Favorite Wife (1940), The Great McGinty (1940), The Lady Eve (1941), Ball of Fire (1941), and To Have and Have Not (1944).

== Selected filmography ==
- The Barker (1928) - Bartender (uncredited)
- Red Morning (1934) - Glibb
- Eight Bells (1935) - Eddy (uncredited)
- The Nitwits (1935) - Black Widow Henchman (uncredited)
- Page Miss Glory (1935) - Taxi Driver (uncredited)
- The Affair of Susan (1935) - Bath House Attendant (uncredited)
- The Girl Friend (1935) - French Soldier in Play (uncredited)
- His Night Out (1935) - Salesman (uncredited)
- Another Face (1935) - Gangster-Type Actor (uncredited)
- Stars Over Broadway (1935) - Man at Champ's Table (uncredited)
- Broadway Hostess (1935) - Jailer (uncredited)
- Professional Soldier (1935) - Waiter (uncredited)
- The Lone Wolf Returns (1935) - Mugg (uncredited)
- Ceiling Zero (1936) - Baldy
- Rose Marie (1936) - Traveling Salesman (uncredited)
- Song of the Saddle (1936) - Curley
- Devil's Squadron (1936) - Dugan - Gateman (uncredited)
- The Three Wise Guys (1936) - Bartender
- The Law in Her Hands (1936) - Joseph Irwin (uncredited)
- Three of a Kind (1936) - Beef Smith
- The Road to Glory (1936) - Soldier with Helmets (uncredited)
- Wolves of the Sea (1936) - Jim Lane
- Parole! (1936) - Prison Drummer (uncredited)
- Sins of Man (1936) - Bum (uncredited)
- A Son Comes Home (1936) - First Checker Player (uncredited)
- Missing Girls (1936) - Gangster
- Murder with Pictures (1936) - Reporter (uncredited)
- Cain and Mabel (1936) - Trainer in Gym (uncredited)
- Valiant Is the Word for Carrie (1936) - Man in Automat (uncredited)
- The Big Broadcast of 1937 (1936) - Stage Manager (uncredited)
- Libeled Lady (1936) - Detective (uncredited)
- Easy to Take (1936) - Harry - Photographer (uncredited)
- Gold Diggers of 1937 (1936) - Drunken Salesman (uncredited)
- Woman in Distress (1937) - Jed (uncredited)
- When You're in Love (1937) - A Babbitt Brother (uncredited)
- A Family Affair (1937) - Convention Delegate (uncredited)
- Turn Off the Moon (1937) - Photographer
- The Jones Family in Big Business (1937) - Oil Man at Well (uncredited)
- Married Before Breakfast (1937) - Short Hobo Being Shaved (uncredited)
- Ever Since Eve (1937) - Neighbor with Water (uncredited)
- It Can't Last Forever (1937) - Fight Trainer (uncredited)
- Exclusive (1937) - Santa Claus (uncredited)
- High, Wide, and Handsome (1937) - Razorback (uncredited)
- Saratoga (1937) - Horse Owner (scenes deleted)
- Broadway Melody of 1938 (1937) - First Bidder (uncredited)
- The Perfect Specimen (1937) - Fight Announcer (uncredited)
- Merry-Go-Round of 1938 (1937) - Farmer (uncredited)
- Missing Witnesses (1937) - Ferry Boat Officer (uncredited)
- True Confession (1937) - Juror (uncredited)
- Bringing Up Baby (1938) - Mac (uncredited)
- Tip-Off Girls (1938) - Proprietor (uncredited)
- Prison Farm (1938) - Station Agent (uncredited)
- Men with Wings (1938) - Photographer (uncredited)
- The Texans (1938) - Real Estate Man (uncredited)
- You Can't Take It with You (1938) - Expressman (uncredited)
- Youth Takes a Fling (1938) - Watchman
- If I Were King (1938) - Bit Part (uncredited)
- Stablemates (1938) - First Railbird (scenes deleted)
- The Storm (1938) - Pub Man (uncredited)
- Illegal Traffic (1938) - Waiter (uncredited)
- Thanks for the Memory (1938) - Refuse Man
- The Law West of Tombstone (1938) - Hank, the Hat-Passer (uncredited)
- Disbarred (1939) - Man in Hotel Lobby (uncredited)
- Boy Trouble (1939) - First Bystander (uncredited)
- Persons in Hiding (1939) - Druggist (uncredited)
- Nancy Drew... Reporter (1939) - Jake (uncredited)
- King of Chinatown (1939) - Fight Announcer
- Ex-Champ (1939) - Locker Attendant (uncredited)
- Only Angels Have Wings (1939) - Baldy
- Some Like It Hot (1939) - Flo's Partner (uncredited)
- Million Dollar Legs (1939) - George, Diner Owner (uncredited)
- Death of a Champion (1939) - Husband (uncredited)
- Babes in Arms (1939) - Vaudevillian Veteran (uncredited)
- Television Spy (1939) - Bunce - Technician (uncredited)
- Geronimo (1939) - Soldier (uncredited)
- Laugh It Off (1939) - Ice Cream Truck Driver (uncredited)
- Four Wives (1939) - Charlie - Taxi Driver (scenes deleted)
- His Girl Friday (1940) - Warden Cooley
- The Farmer's Daughter (1940) - Chuck Stevens (uncredited)
- Seventeen (1940) - Station Agent (uncredited)
- King of the Lumberjacks (1940) - Second Waiter
- My Favorite Wife (1940) - Caretaker at Arden's Mountain Place (uncredited)
- I Can't Give You Anything But Love, Baby (1940) - Sound Effects Man (uncredited)
- La Conga Nights (1940) - Barney (uncredited)
- The Great McGinty (1940) - Pappia Saunders - Bail Bondsman (uncredited)
- When the Daltons Rode (1940) - Pete - Restaurant Counterman (uncredited)
- Golden Gloves (1940) - Ring Announcer (uncredited)
- I Want a Divorce (1940) - Elevator Operator (uncredited)
- Hired Wife (1940) - Office Worker (uncredited)
- Slightly Tempted (1940) - Bartlett (uncredited)
- Christmas in July (1940) - Man with Phone (uncredited)
- The Bank Dick (1940) - Assistant Director
- Meet the Chump (1941) - Gas Station Attendant (uncredited)
- Nice Girl? (1941) - Gossip (uncredited)
- The Lady Eve (1941) - Ship's Bartender (uncredited)
- Las Vegas Nights (1941) - Bartender (uncredited)
- Pot o' Gold (1941) - Trading Post Manager (uncredited)
- The Cowboy and the Blonde (1941) - Sound Man (uncredited)
- Power Dive (1941) - Bob - Burly Mechanic
- Caught in the Draft (1941) - Army Cook (uncredited)
- Sergeant York (1941) - Sergeant (uncredited)
- Ellery Queen and the Perfect Crime (1941) - Moving Man (uncredited)
- Flying Blind (1941) - Jerry - Cargo Loader (uncredited)
- Birth of the Blues (1941) - Proprietor of Pool Hall (uncredited)
- Ellery Queen and the Murder Ring (1941) - Ambulance Attendant (uncredited)
- The Night of January 16th (1941) - Bartender (uncredited)
- No Hands on the Clock (1941) - Marty (uncredited)
- Sullivan's Travels (1941) - Las Vegas Diner Counterman (uncredited)
- Johnny Eager (1941) - Eddie (uncredited)
- Ball of Fire (1941) - Bum
- The Fleet's In (1942) - Bartender (uncredited)
- Mokey (1942) - Second Hobo (uncredited)
- Take a Letter, Darling (1942) - Boarder (uncredited)
- Sunday Punch (1942) - Ring Announcer (uncredited)
- This Gun for Hire (1942) - Janitor (uncredited)
- Are Husbands Necessary? (1942) - Mover (uncredited)
- I Live on Danger (1942) - Janitor (uncredited)
- Invisible Agent (1942) - German Taxi Driver (uncredited)
- The Forest Rangers (1942) - Bartender (uncredited)
- Wrecking Crew (1942) - Gus - Sleeping Man (uncredited)
- Madame Spy (1942) - Taxicab Driver (uncredited)
- Stand by for Action (1942) - Sailor (uncredited)
- No Time for Love (1943) - Pop Murphy's Waiter (uncredited)
- Air Force (1943) - Soldier with Demolition Squad (uncredited)
- The Outlaw (1943) - Bartender (uncredited)
- Submarine Alert (1943) - Radio Listener (uncredited)
- Slightly Dangerous (1943) - Man Getting On Bus and Dropping Penny (uncredited)
- Presenting Lily Mars (1943) - Bartender in Bar (uncredited)
- Minesweeper (1943) - Haberdasher (uncredited)
- Passport to Destiny (1944) - Second Bus Conductor (uncredited)
- Week-End Pass (1944) - Deputy (uncredited)
- The Navy Way (1944) - Bartender (uncredited)
- Moon Over Las Vegas (1944) - Taxi Driver
- And the Angels Sing (1944) - Bartender at Polonais Café (uncredited)
- Gambler's Choice (1944) - Eddie (uncredited)
- Meet the People (1944) - Boilermaker with 200 Pledges (uncredited)
- Louisiana Hayride (1944) - Motel Boarder (uncredited)
- National Barn Dance (1944) - Farmer (uncredited)
- To Have and Have Not (1944) - Bartender (uncredited)
- Incendiary Blonde (1945) - Bartender (uncredited)
- Road to Utopia (1945) - Bartender (uncredited) (final film role)
