= King of the Lumberjacks =

1940 film

- Directed by: William Clemens
- Written by: Robert E. Kent; Crane Wilbur
- Produced by: William Clemens; Bryan Foy; Hal B. Wallis; Jack L. Warner
- Starring: John Payne; Gloria Dickson; Stanley Fields
- Cinematography: Sidney Hickox
- Edited by: Doug Gould
- Music by: William Lava
- Production company: Warner Bros. Pictures
- Distributed by: Warner Bros. Pictures
- Release date: April 13, 1940
- Running time: 58 minutes
- Country: United States
- Language: English

King of the Lumberjacks is a 1940 American Western film directed by William Clemens and starring John Payne, Gloria Dickson and Stanley Fields.

The film's sets were designed by the art director Esdras Hartley.

== Cast ==
- John Payne as James 'Jim' 'Slim' Abbott
- Gloria Dickson as Tina Martin Deribault
- Stanley Fields as Dominic Deribault
- Joe Sawyer as Jigger, a Lumberjack
- Victor Kilian as Joe
- Earl Dwire as Dr. Vance
- Herbert Heywood as Laramie, Train Engineer
- G. Pat Collins as Mr. Gregg, Parole Officer
- John Sheehan as Bartender
- Pat West as Second Waiter
- Nat Carr as 'Shorty', First Waiter
- Jack Mower as 'Red', Truck Driver
- John 'Skins' Miller as 'Cooky', the Camp Cook

== Bibliography ==
- Pitts, Michael R. Western Movies: A Guide to 5,105 Feature Films. McFarland, 2012.
