= Wednesday's Child (play) =

1934 Broadway play

- Original language: English
- Written by: Leopold L. Atlas
- Genre: Drama
- Setting: Phillips' home, Boardwalk along the sea, courtroom, Benton living room

Premiere
- Date: January 16, 1934
- Place: Longacre Theatre; New York City, New York

Wednesday's Child is a 1934 Broadway two-act drama written by Leopold L. Atlas, produced by H.C. Potter and George Haight, staged by Potter with scenic design created by Tom Adrian Cracraft. It ran for 56 performances from January 16, 1934, to March 1934 at the Longacre Theatre.

The play was included in Burns Mantle's The Best Plays of 1933-1934.

It was adapted into the 1934 film Wednesday's Child directed by John S. Robertson and starring Edward Arnold and Karen Morley with Frank Thomas Jr. recreating his role as Bobby Phillips. It was also adapted into the 1946 film Child of Divorce.

== Cast ==
- Katherine Warren as Kathryn Phillips
- Walter N. Greaza as Ray Phillips
- Frank Thomas Jr. as Bobby Phillips
- Walter Gilbert as Howard Benton
- Mona Bruns as Miss Chapman
- Leonard M. Barker as clerk
- Stanton Bier as Herbert
- Wyrley Birch as Dr. Stirling
- Joie Brown as Georgie
- Harry Clancy as Joie
- Alfred Dalrymple as Mr. Keyes
- Harry Hanlon as Judge
- Sally Hodges as Carrie
- Richard Jack as Chic Nevins
- Lester Lonergan, III as Alfred
- Robert Mayors as Lenny
- Cele McLaughlin as Louise
- George Pembroke as Mr. Proctor
