= Nancy Drew and the Hidden Staircase (1939 film) =

1939 film

- Australian Film poster
- Directed by: William Clemens
- Written by: Kenneth Garnet
- Based on: Nancy Drew by Edward Stratemeyer and The Hidden Staircase; 1930 novel by Mildred Wirt Benson
- Produced by: Bryan Foy; Hal B. Wallis; Jack L. Warner
- Starring: Bonita Granville; Frankie Thomas; John Litel
- Cinematography: L. William O'Connell
- Edited by: Louis Hesse
- Music by: Heinz Roemheld
- Production company: Warner Bros. Pictures
- Distributed by: Warner Bros. Pictures
- Release date: September 9, 1939
- Running time: 60 minutes
- Country: United States
- Language: English

Nancy Drew and the Hidden Staircase is a 1939 American mystery film directed by William Clemens and written by Kenneth Garnet. It is the fourth and final film in the original Nancy Drew film series and a sequel to Nancy Drew... Trouble Shooter (1939). The film stars Bonita Granville as teenage amateur detective Nancy Drew, Frankie Thomas as her boyfriend, and John Litel as her father. It was loosely based on the novel of the same name by Mildred Wirt Benson. The film was released by Warner Bros. Pictures on September 9, 1939.

== Plot ==
Elderly sisters Rosemary and Floretta Turnbull want to donate their mansion for a children's hospital. However, their father's will states that at least one of them has to stay in the house every night for twenty years before they can inherit the estate; there are two weeks left to go.

Then some strange things start occurring. A stranger forces his way past Nancy Drew and brazenly searches the Drew house for related affidavits her lawyer father Carson has obtained. Then, the Turnbulls' chauffeur Phillips dies, though it is uncertain if it was a murder or a suicide. The frightened old ladies consider leaving their home. When Nancy recognizes the dead man as the trespasser, she begins investigating, dragging her boyfriend Ted Nickerson into one predicament after another, eventually getting him fired and jailed.

When police Captain Tweedy arrests the two sisters for Phillips' murder, their ownership is endangered. Just in time, Nancy and Ted discover a secret passageway in the basement linking it to the neighboring house, owned by Daniel Talbert. Talbert would make a lot of money if a racetrack were to be built on the two properties, but the Turnbulls had turned down an offer to buy their place.

== Cast ==
- Bonita Granville as Nancy Drew
- Frankie Thomas as Ted Nickerson
- John Litel as Carson Drew
- Frank Orth as Captain Tweedy
- Renie Riano as Effie Schneider
- Vera Lewis as Rosemary Turnbull
- Louise Carter as Floretta Turnbull
- William Gould as Daniel Talbert
- George Guhl as Smitty
- John Ridgely as Reporter
- William Hopper as Reporter
- Creighton Hale as Reporter
- Frank Mayo as Tribune Photographer
- Frederic Tozere as District Attorney's Investigator
- Don Rowan as Phillips the Chauffeur
- Dick Elliott as McKeever
- Jack Mower as Ice Company Dispatcher (uncredited)
- Cliff Saum as Burt the Iceman (uncredited)

== Production ==
It was the only film to borrow its title from a book in the series, although the plot was altered substantially. One critic wrote that "the only similarity between the book and the film was the word staircase." Nancy's boyfriend Ned Nickerson became Ted Nickerson, as "Ned" was considered too old-fashioned, and housekeeper Hannah Gruen was replaced by Effie Schneider, a minor character who had appeared in only a few books as the Drews' part-time maid; in the films, Effie's traits are combined with Hannah's. Nancy's friends George and Bess were eliminated, "mystery elements were downplayed, plots simplified, and the romance spiced up." To promote the film, Warner Bros. created a Nancy Drew fan club that included a set of rules, such as: "Must have steady boy friend, in the sense of a 'pal'" and must "Take part in choosing own clothes." These rules were based on some research Warner Bros. had done on the habits and attitudes of "typical" teenage girls.

Bonita Granville starred in four films — Nancy Drew... Detective (1938), Nancy Drew... Reporter (1939), Nancy Drew... Trouble Shooter (1939), and Nancy Drew and the Hidden Staircase (1939).
