= Pride of the Blue Grass (1939 film) =

1939 film

- Directed by: William C. McGann
- Screenplay by: Vincent Sherman
- Produced by: Bryan Foy
- Starring: Edith Fellows; James McCallion; Granville Bates; Aldrich Bowker; Arthur Loft; William Hopper
- Cinematography: Ted D. McCord
- Edited by: Frank DeWar
- Music by: Howard Jackson
- Production company: Warner Bros. Pictures
- Distributed by: Warner Bros. Pictures
- Release date: October 7, 1939
- Running time: 65 minutes
- Country: United States
- Language: English

Pride of the Blue Grass is a 1939 American drama film directed by William C. McGann and written by Vincent Sherman. The film stars Edith Fellows, James McCallion, Granville Bates, Aldrich Bowker, Arthur Loft and William Hopper. The film was based on an actual 15-year-old blind horse, Elmer Gantry, who was co-billed as a star and played himself. Gantry was bought and trained as a show horse by wrangler Eleanor Getzendaner but became blind at the age of 13 following two years of experiencing periodic ophthalmia, after which she patiently trained him to jump.

The film was released by Warner Bros. Pictures on October 7, 1939.

== Plot ==
When his father, a disreputable trainer of thoroughbred horses, is killed in a barn fire, young Danny Lowman is able to save the colt Gantry the Great. He gives the new colt to his friend Midge Griner, whose father Colonel Griner owns a stable.

Years pass as Danny moves west and grows up. Frustrated in an attempt to become a jockey, Danny is accused of illegally activities similar to his late father's and faces jail until Midge vouches for him, persuading her dad to give Danny a job. He is reunited with the colt, which has been violently abused by trainer Dave Miller.

The horse responds to Danny's presence in the saddle and begins winning races, saving the Griner stable, which had fallen on hard times. But its narrow defeat in the Kentucky Derby casts suspicion on Danny's effort. Later realizing that the horse has gone blind, possibly from Miller's harsh treatment, Danny and Midge still enter Gantry Jr. in a Grand National steeplechase race in England, where they are victorious and save the family farm.

== Cast ==
- Edith Fellows as Midge Griner
- James McCallion as Danny Lowman
- Granville Bates as Col. Bob Griner
- Aldrich Bowker as Judge
- Arthur Loft as Dave Miller
- William Hopper as Joe
- Frankie Burke as Willie Hobson
- Frederic Tozere as First Stranger
- Edgar Edwards as Second Stranger
- John Butler as Mack Lowman
- Sam McDaniel as Domino Jones
- Bernice Pilot as Beverly
- Walter Fenner as Secretary to Board of Stewards
- Raymond Brown as Sheriff Adams
- Lawrence Grant as Lord Shropshire
- Ernie Stanton as Roberts (uncredited)

== See also ==
- List of films about horses
- List of films about horse racing
