= Public Wedding =

1937 film by Nick Grinde

- Theatrical release poster
- Directed by: Nick Grinde
- Screenplay by: Roy Chanslor; Houston Branch
- Story by: Houston Branch
- Produced by: Bryan Foy
- Starring: Jane Wyman; William Hopper; Dick Purcell; Marie Wilson; Berton Churchill; Archie Robbins
- Cinematography: L. William O'Connell
- Edited by: Frank DeWar
- Music by: Howard Jackson
- Production company: Warner Bros. Pictures
- Distributed by: Warner Bros. Pictures
- Release date: July 10, 1937
- Running time: 58 minutes
- Country: United States
- Language: English

Public Wedding is a 1937 American comedy film directed by Nick Grinde and written by Roy Chanslor and Houston Branch. The film stars Jane Wyman (in her first starring role), William Hopper, Dick Purcell, Marie Wilson, Berton Churchill and Archie Robbins. The film was released by Warner Bros. Pictures on July 10, 1937.

== Plot ==
Pop Lane, his daughter Flip, con men Nick and The Deacon, and wheeler-dealer Joe Taylor are grifters running a failed carnival concession in New York. They scheme to stage a scam public wedding, with Flip as the bride, Nick as the groom, and The Deacon as the judge, but the con men abscond with the gate receipts. Confronted with a restless audience eager for their money's worth, Pop enlists "starving artist" Tony Burke as a stand-in. The "wedding" is a great success but to the surprise of all, the "judge" performing the ceremony is a real justice of the peace, and Flip and Tony find themselves actually married. Flip angrily walks out on Pop, impressing Tony, who takes her to his studio above a stable and suggests that their marriage might be a good idea after all. The penniless Pop and Joe track them down and Tony agrees to put them up for a night.

The next morning Pop and Joe try to hock Flip's wedding dress but instead hit up fan dancer Tessie Schultz for a loan after rescuing her from a police raid. The wedding dress gives Joe the idea to promote Tessie as stripper "Lillith Love" by having her pretend to be an amnesiac bride who attempted suicide after being left at the altar. In the meantime, Flip tries to peddle Tony's paintings without success because he has no reputation. The publicity about Joe's stunt prompts Flip to get people talking about Tony by foisting him off as the groom who "placed Art before Love." Society matrons clamor for portraits but nothing is happening for Pop, Joe and Tessie. Because Flip took advantage of their set-up, they demand that she cut them in on the profits.

When Tony learns about Flip's manipulations, he is furious. But realizing that they love each other, however, he agrees to try the marriage if Flip will let him be the boss. Tony plans to clean his financial success of its "larcenous taint" by endowing a fellowship to send deserving young artists to Europe to learn their craft without financial struggle. He offers Pop and the others a check for $1,000 to get out of town. Pop uses the check as a prop to pretend to raise donations as treasurer of the "Anthony Burke Traveling Fellowship, Ltd.", bilking New York society into donating. Flip discovers the racket just after fake fellowship has withdrawn all its funds from the bank in cash.

Tony is arrested for obtaining money on false pretenses, and Flip pursues Pop, Joe and Tessie to the airport. She discovers that the serial numbers of the cash are consecutive. She convinces them the money is hot and to give it to her since they will be arrested if they are caught with it. Before they can leave the airport, though, they are nabbed by the victim of one of their earlier schemes. Flip redeposits the money in an irrevocable trust to be used for its real purpose, and shows the police the deposit slip to gain Tony's release. Tessie visits Pop in jail with the "wonderful romantic news" that Flip and Tony have sailed to Europe for their honeymoon.

== Cast ==
- Jane Wyman as Flip Lane
- William Hopper as Tony Burke
- Dick Purcell as Joe Taylor
- Marie Wilson as Tessie
- Berton Churchill as Pop Lane
- Archie Robbins as Nick
- Raymond Hatton as The Deacon
- Veda Ann Borg as Bernice
- Zeni Vatori as Gus Papadopoulos
- Jimmie Fox as Jeremiah Boggs
- Curtis Karpe as Pete
- Carlyle Moore Jr. as Reporter
- Horace McMahon as Reporter
- John Harron as Reporter
- Jack Mower as Reporter
- Lyle Moraine as Reporter
