= Bonita Granville =

American actress and producer (1923–1988)

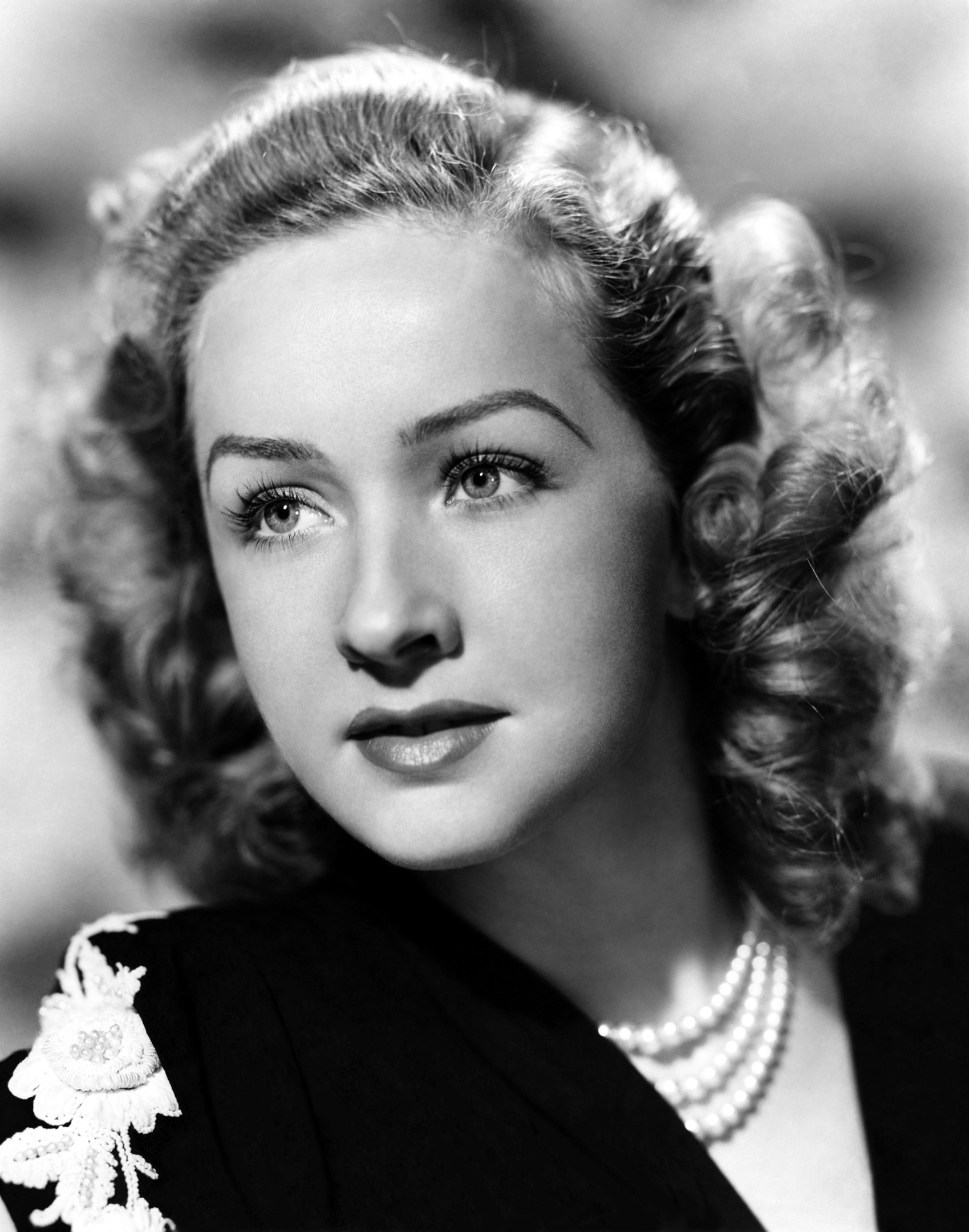
- Granville c. 1946
- Born: Bonita Gloria Granville; February 2, 1923; New York City, U.S.
- Died: October 11, 1988 (aged 65); Santa Monica, California, U.S.
- Resting place: Holy Cross Cemetery, Culver City, California
- Other names: Bonita Granville Wrather "Bunny"
- Occupations: Actress; producer
- Years active: 1926–1981
- Known for: These Three; Nancy Drew... Reporter; Nancy Drew... Detective; Nancy Drew... Trouble Shooter; Nancy Drew and the Hidden Staircase; Now, Voyager
- Spouse: Jack Wrather (m. 1947; died 1984)
- Children: 2
- Awards: Hollywood Walk of Fame

Bonita Gloria Granville Wrather (February 2, 1923 – October 11, 1988) was an American character actress and producer. The daughter of vaudevillians, Granville began her career on the stage at age three. She began as a child actress, making her film debut in Westward Passage (1932). She rose to prominence for her role in These Three (1936), which earned her an Academy Award nomination at age 14. Her prominence continued with the Nancy Drew film series and roles in Now, Voyager (1942) and Hitler's Children (1943).

After marrying Jack Wrather in 1947, Granville transitioned into producing with her husband on series such as Lassie (1959–1973). She also worked as a philanthropist and a businesswoman, owning and operating the Disneyland Hotel and the Queen Mary in Long Beach, with her husband. She was appointed to the John F. Kennedy Center board of trustees by President Richard Nixon in 1972 and for another term by President Ronald Reagan in 1982.

In addition to her Oscar nomination, Granville received a star on the Hollywood Walk of Fame in 1960 for her contributions to the film industry. Her husband and she were posthumously named Disney Legends in 2011.

== Early life ==
Granville was born on February 2, 1923, in Manhattan, New York City, the daughter of Rosina (née Timponi) and Bernard Granville. Both of her parents were stage performers. She was raised Roman Catholic.

== Career ==
=== 1932–1941: Child actress ===
She made her film debut at the age of nine in Westward Passage (1932) and appeared in a credited but nearly wordless supporting role as the young dancer Fanny Bridges in Cavalcade (1933), which won the Academy Award for Best Picture. Over the next few years, she played uncredited supporting roles in such films as Little Women (1933) and Anne of Green Gables (1934). She next played the role of Mary Tilford in the 1936 film adaptation of Lillian Hellman's 1934 stage play The Children's Hour. Renamed These Three, the film told the story of three adults (played by Miriam Hopkins, Merle Oberon, and Joel McCrea) who find their lives almost destroyed by the malicious lies of an evil, attention-seeking child. For her role as that child, Granville was nominated for an Academy Award for Best Supporting Actress, then the youngest person to be nominated for an Oscar.

In 1938, Granville was cast by Warner Bros. to play the role of girl detective Nancy Drew in a series of B movies based on the novels. The films were meant to resemble the popular Torchy Blane film series starring Glenda Farrell. Granville co-starred in the films with John Litel as her father, Carson Drew, and Frankie Thomas, Jr. as Ted Nickerson. All four films — Nancy Drew... Detective (1938), Nancy Drew... Reporter (1939), Nancy Drew... Trouble Shooter (1939), and Nancy Drew and the Hidden Staircase (1939) — were played continuously in theaters over the next several years. Also in 1938, Granville appeared as the saucy, mischievous daughter in the multiple Academy Award-nominated hit comedy film Merrily We Live and starred as the title character in The Beloved Brat. She also performed in Angels Wash Their Faces (1939) alongside Ronald Reagan, who became a lifelong friend.

In late 1939, Granville left Warner Bros. and signed a contract with MGM, but she continued to be relegated to supporting roles in The Mortal Storm (1940) and H. M. Pulham, Esq. (1941), and less substantial leading roles in Those Were the Days! (1940) and Down in San Diego (1941). She soon parted ways with MGM.

=== 1942–1947: Stardom ===
In 1941, Granville signed with RKO Pictures and immediately found more substantial supporting roles in The Glass Key (1942) and Now, Voyager (1942), for which she was lent to Paramount and Warner Bros. Following her leading role in Seven Miles from Alcatraz (1942), director Edward Dmytryk cast her in RKO's World War II anti-Nazism film Hitler's Children (1943). The film was a commercial and critical success, becoming one of the studio's highest-grossing films of the year, and one of the highest-grossing for both RKO and 1943. However, the studio then relegated her to B-films such as Youth Runs Wild (1944) and The Truth About Murder (1946). She also continued to be lent out to other studios. For example, she was sent to MGM for two Andy Hardy films with Mickey Rooney, Andy Hardy's Blonde Trouble (1944) and Love Laughs at Andy Hardy (1946), as well as a leading role in Song of the Open Road (1944); to Universal for The Beautiful Cheat and Senorita from the West (both 1945); and to United Artists for Breakfast in Hollywood. Following being lent to Monogram Pictures for Suspense (1946) and The Guilty (1947), Granville informally retired from films, only appearing in Strike It Rich (1948) and Guilty of Treason (1950).

=== 1948–1988: Later career ===
On February 5, 1947, Granville married Jack Wrather at the Bel-Air Hotel, having met him while he produced The Guilty. He formed the Wrather Corporation, and bought the rights to the characters from both The Lone Ranger and Lassie. Granville worked as a producer for several film and television productions featuring these characters, including the 1954 TV series Lassie.

She appeared in the film version of The Lone Ranger in 1956, and made her final screen appearance in a cameo role in The Legend of the Lone Ranger (1981).

Together, she and her husband had four children, two from Wrather's previous marriage to Mollie O'Daniel, a daughter of Governor of Texas and U.S. Senator W. Lee O'Daniel. Granville's marriage to Wrather lasted until Wrather's death in 1984, shortly after release of the movie The Magic of Lassie, co-produced by Granville and starring Wrather's friend James Stewart. In 1949, she appeared with Rod Cameron in the comedy film Strike It Rich.

== Death ==
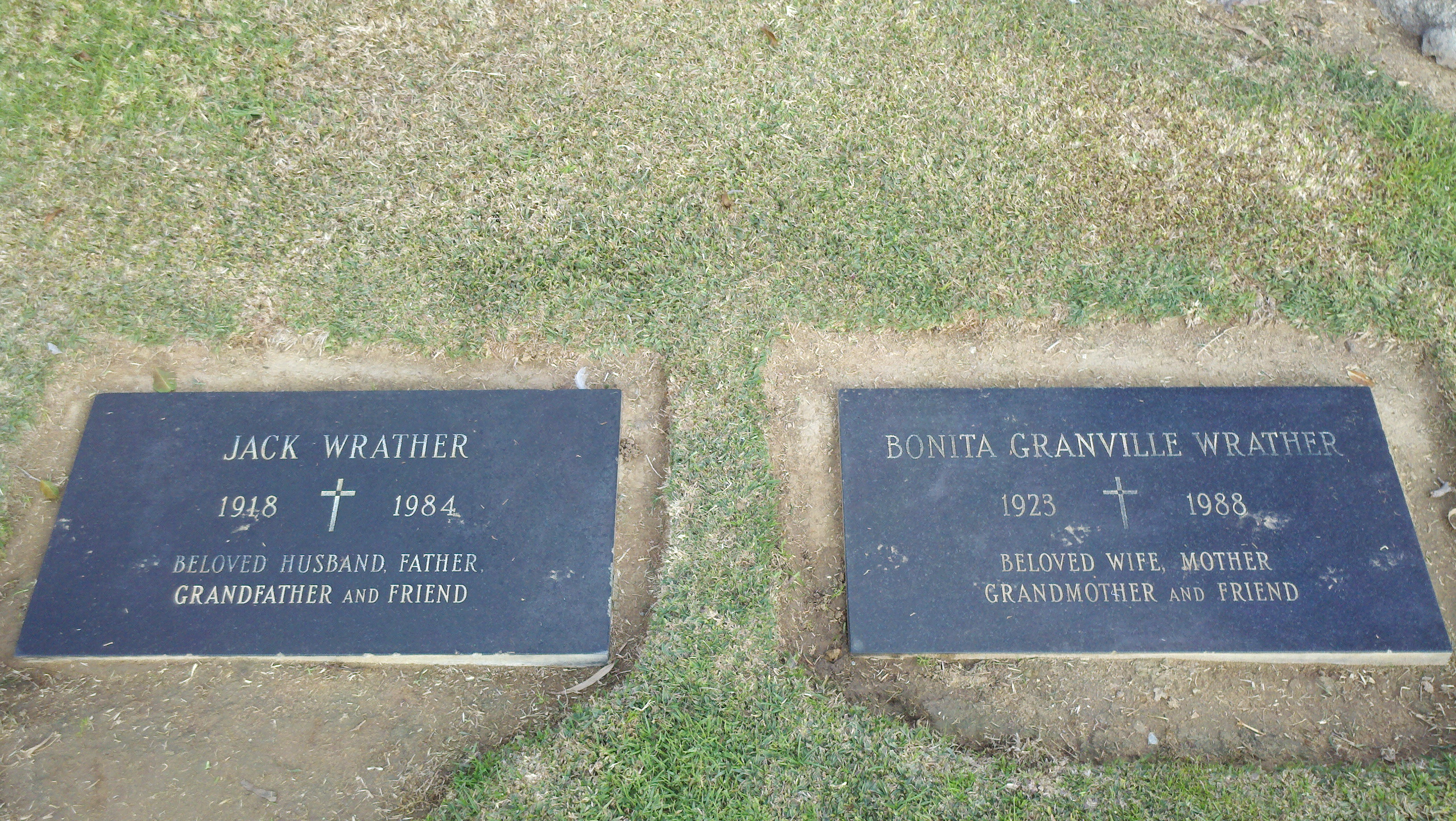
Bonita Granville's grave, next to that of her husband Jack Wrather, at Holy Cross Cemetery, Culver City, California

Granville died on October 11, 1988, of lung cancer at Saint John's Health Center in Santa Monica, California, at the age of 65. She was buried at the Holy Cross Cemetery in Culver City, California with a Catholic Mass.

== Legacy ==
Granville has a star on the Hollywood Walk of Fame, at 6607 Hollywood Boulevard, for her contributions to motion pictures. She was honored at the Disneyland Hotel, which she and her husband owned until The Wrather Company was sold to the Walt Disney Company after Granville's death. The Bonita Tower and the Granville's Steak House were named in her honor. In 2011, Disney honored the Wrathers posthumously by inducting them into the Disney Legends.

In 1942, Granville's image was used as the heroine of the novel Bonita Granville and the Mystery of Star Island. The story, written by Kathryn Heisenfelt, was published by Whitman Publishing Company in 1942. The story was written for a young teenaged audience and is reminiscent of the adventures of Nancy Drew. Part of a series known as "Whitman Authorized Editions", 16 books published between 1941 and 1947 each featured a film actress as heroine.

== Filmography ==
=== Features ===
Year	Title	Role	Notes
1932	Westward Passage	Little Olivia Allen (age 10)	
1932	Silver Dollar	Liddy	Uncredited
1933	Cavalcade	Young Fanny	
1933	Beauty for Sale	Little Girl at Madame Sonia's	Uncredited
1933	Little Women	Amy's Classmate	Uncredited
1933	Cradle Song	Carmen	
1934	The Life of Vergie Winters	Joan Winters as a Child	Uncredited
1934	Anne of Green Gables	School Girl	Uncredited
1935	Ah, Wilderness!	Mildred Miller	
1936	Song of the Saddle	Jen as a Child	
1936	These Three	Mary Tilford	
1936	The Garden of Allah	Convent Girl	Uncredited
1936	The Plough and the Stars	Mollser	
1937	Maid of Salem	Ann – Their Daughter	
1937	Quality Street	Isabella	Uncredited
1937	Call It a Day	Ann Hilton	
1937	It's Love I'm After	Gracie Kane	
1938	White Banners	Sally Ward	
1938	Merrily We Live	Marian Kilbourne	
1938	The Beloved Brat	Roberta Morgan	
1938	My Bill	Gwen Colbrook	
1938	Hard to Get	Connie	
1938	Nancy Drew... Detective	Nancy Drew	
1939	Nancy Drew... Reporter	Nancy Drew	
1939	Nancy Drew... Trouble Shooter	Nancy Drew	
1939	Nancy Drew and the Hidden Staircase	Nancy Drew	
1939	The Angels Wash Their Faces	Peggy Finnegan	
1940	Forty Little Mothers	Doris	
1940	Those Were the Days!	Martha Scroggs	
1940	The Mortal Storm	Elsa	
1940	Third Finger, Left Hand	Vicky Sherwood	
1940	Escape	Ursula	
1940	Gallant Sons	Kate Pendleton	
1941	The Wild Man of Borneo	Francine Diamond	
1941	The People vs. Dr. Kildare	Frances Marlowe	
1941	Down in San Diego	Betty Haines	
1941	H.M. Pulham, Esq.	Mary Pulham	
1942	Syncopation	Kit Latimer	
1942	The Glass Key	Opal Madvig	
1942	Seven Miles from Alcatraz	Anne Porter	
1942	Now, Voyager	June Vale	
1943	Hitler's Children	Anna Müller	
1944	Andy Hardy's Blonde Trouble	Kay Wilson	
1944	Song of the Open Road	Bonnie	
1944	Youth Runs Wild	Toddy Jones	
1945	The Beautiful Cheat	Alice	
1945	Senorita from the West	Jeannie Blake	
1946	Breakfast in Hollywood	Dorothy Larson	
1946	The Truth About Murder	Christine Allen	
1946	Suspense	Ronnie	
1946	Love Laughs at Andy Hardy	Kay Wilson	
1947	The Guilty	Estelle Mitchell / Linda Mitchell	
1948	Strike It Rich	Julie Ann Brady	
1950	Guilty of Treason	Stephanie Varna	
1956	The Lone Ranger	Welcome Kilgore	
1981	The Legend of the Lone Ranger	Woman	Uncredited - final film role

As Producer

Year	Title	Notes
1963	Lassie's Great Adventure	
1978	The Magic of Lassie	(as Bonita Granville Wrather)

=== Television ===
Year	Title	Role	Notes
1951	Armstrong Circle Theatre		Episode: "That's Simon's Girl"
1951	The Bigelow Theatre		Episode: "Make Your Bed"
1951	Somerset Maugham TV Theatre		Episode: "Masquerade"
1951	Lux Video Theatre	Kitty	Episode: "Not Guilty - of Much"
1951	Gruen Guild Playhouse		2 episodes
1952	Gruen Guild Playhouse		Episode: "I Saw It Happen"
1952	The Schaefer Century Theatre		2 episodes
1952	Chevron Theatre		2 episodes
1952	The Unexpected	Woman	Episode: "The Woman Who Left Herself"
1953	Broadway Television Theatre	Evelyn Heath	Episode: "Guest in the House"
1953	The Ford Television Theatre	Margo Foster	Episode: "The Son-in-Law"
1954	The Pepsi-Cola Playhouse		Episode: "Annual Honeymoon"
1955	Crown Theatre with Gloria Swanson		Episode: "The Antique Shop"
1955	The Eddie Cantor Comedy Theatre	Pearl	Episode: "The Suspicious Husband"
1955	Schlitz Playhouse of Stars	Ellen Morison	Episode:"Sentence to Death"
1955	Climax!	Laura Jordan	Episode: "The Healer"
1956	Climax!	Molly	Episode: "The Fifth Wheel"
1956	Ethel Barrymore Theater		Episode: "Lady Investigator"
1956	Matinee Theater	Edna Johnson	Episode: "The 25th Hour"
1956	The Fisher Family		Episode: "Burden Made Light"
1957	Lux Video Theatre	Joan / Anne	Episodes: "One Way Passenger" & "Stand-in for Murder"
1957	Science Fiction Theatre	Barbara Cameron	Episode: "Killer Tree"
1957	The United States Steel Hour		Episode: "Shadow in the Sky"
1958	Studio One	Ann	Episode: "The Fair-Haired Boy"
1958	Target	Alice Ward	Episode: "Edge of Terror"
1959	Playhouse 90	Mrs. Kirkley	Episode: "The Velvet Alley"
1960	Lassie	Mrs. Brewster	Episode: "The Wrong Gift"
1961	The Best of the Post	Widow	Episode: "The Valley of the Blue Mountain"
1963-1972	Lassie	Narrator	
1965	Lassie	Nancy Hoyt	Episode: "Lassie's Teamwork"
1966	Lassie	Williamsburg tour guide	Episode: "Lassie the Voyager: Part 3"
1968	Lassie	Mrs. Wade	Episode: "Hanford's Point: Part 3" Uncredited

As Producer

Year	Title	Notes
1959-1973	Lassie	374 episodes
1963	Lassie: A Christmas Tail	TV Movie
1967	Flight of the Cougar	TV Movie
1968	Lassie: The Adventures of Neeka	TV Movie
1970	Lassie: Well of Love	TV Movie

== Radio appearances ==
Year	Program	Episode/source
1945	Suspense	Bank Holiday
1952	Family Theater	The Promise

== Awards and nominations ==
Year	Award	Category	Nominated work	Result
1936	9th Academy Awards	Academy Award for Best Supporting Actress	These Three	Nominated
