= Everybody's Hobby =

1939 film by William C. McGann

- Theatrical release poster
- Directed by: William C. McGann
- Screenplay by: Kenneth Gamet; William W. Brockway
- Story by: William W. Brockway
- Produced by: Bryan Foy
- Starring: Irene Rich; Henry O'Neill; Jackie Moran; Aldrich Bowker; Jean Sharon; John Ridgely; Peggy Stewart
- Cinematography: Sidney Hickox
- Edited by: Frank Magee
- Music by: Howard Jackson
- Production company: Warner Bros. Pictures
- Distributed by: Warner Bros. Pictures
- Release date: August 26, 1939
- Running time: 54 minutes
- Country: United States
- Language: English

Everybody's Hobby is a 1939 American comedy film directed by William C. McGann and written by Kenneth Gamet and William W. Brockway. The film stars Irene Rich, Henry O'Neill, Jackie Moran, Aldrich Bowker, Jean Sharon, John Ridgely and Peggy Stewart. The film was released by Warner Bros. Pictures on August 26, 1939.

== Plot ==
Tom Leslie is having some trouble at his newspaper job, so his wife, a stamp collector, suggests he distract himself with a former hobby of his own, photography. Tom is afraid he is going to lose his job. Robert tries to fix a radio but gets electrocuted. He didn't realize he had to pull it out of the socket. Mr. Gasteel comes for a visit. Robert gets mad at him for offering to help. Tom Leslie's employer doesn't like the way that Tom does his reporting. Tom doesn't want to run a gossip article. Robert is happy that he passes his test for his game radio license. Tom takes his son Robert to a national park, where the boy, a short-wave radio enthusiast, enjoys his hobby, too. They meet Tom Morgan, the park ranger. Tom invited them to a camp dance. Robert refuses because he is sick of women. He meets some girls and Robert soon realizes that he is not sick of women.

A park ranger informs the Leslies that a pyromaniac is on the loose and to be careful. Soon they and others are threatened by a roaring blaze, Tom Morgan makes Tom a fire marshal. Robert's radio enables them to send for life-saving help, while a story from a photo Tom takes of the fire of Pine Ridge ends up capturing the pyromaniac in the same frame. They request from Robert's radio several volunteers to save the town of Newton. The Leslies are considered heroes.

== Cast ==
- Irene Rich as Mrs. Myra Leslie
- Henry O'Neill as Thomas 'Tom' Leslie
- Jackie Moran as Robert Leslie
- Aldrich Bowker as Uncle Bert Leslie
- Jean Sharon as Evelyn Leslie
- John Ridgely as Ranger Mike Morgan
- Peggy Stewart as Bunny
- Jackie Morrow as Chuck
- Frederic Tozere as Mr. Hatfield
- Alberto Morin as Ramón Castello
- Nat Carr as Jim Blake
- Sidney Bracey as Mr. Ferris
- Jack Mower as Police Captain Ogden
- Don Rowan as Ranger Murphy
