= The Law in Her Hands =

1936 film by William Clemens

- Movie poster
- Directed by: William Clemens
- Screenplay by: George Bricker; Luci Ward
- Story by: George Bricker
- Produced by: Bryan Foy
- Starring: Margaret Lindsay; Glenda Farrell
- Cinematography: Sidney Hickox
- Edited by: Clarence Kolster
- Music by: Heinz Roemheld
- Production company: First National Pictures
- Distributed by: Warner Bros. Pictures
- Release date: May 16, 1936
- Running time: 58 minutes
- Country: United States
- Language: English

The Law in Her Hands is a 1936 American drama film directed by William Clemens, written by George Bricker and Luci Ward and starring Margaret Lindsay and Glenda Farrell. It was released by Warner Bros. Pictures on May 16, 1936. The film's working title was Lawyer Woman.

== Plot ==
Two waitresses working in New York, Mary Wentworth and Dorothy Davis, pass the bar exam and become lawyers. Their employer Franz inadvertently photographs a gangster just before the man ignites a smoke bomb in the restaurant. The intent of the smoke bombing was to intimidate Franz into joining a protection racket run by crime boss Frank Gordon. The perpetrator is arrested and the case is prosecuted by Robert Mitchell, who is Mary's boyfriend. At the trial, Gordon finds people to testify that the defendant was not at the restaurant, but Mary and Dorothy show the photograph. Gordon is impressed with Mary's performance and offers her a job as his lawyer, but she declines, wishing to remain clear of underworld activities.

When a corrupt lawyer plants a bottle of liquor in a coat that Mary had entered into evidence, she loses her first case in court. Robert believes that the law is not a suitable profession for a woman, and he asks her to abandon her career in order to marry him. Mary asserts that she wishes to overcome her first defeat and persevere in the law, but she will agree to his request if she cannot find success within a year.

Hoping to discourage Mary, Robert suggests that she represent a man who has already signed a confession. Later, Mary employs the same trick and defeats Robert in court. She finally accepts Gordon as a client and the fledgling law firm becomes a great success with a large and busy office.

When Mary learns that Gordon's gang was responsible for poisoning milk that caused multiple deaths, she changes her mind and refuses to continue to represent him. When Gordon forces her to defend him, she turns on him in court and accuses him of having committed the crime, and Gordon is convicted. She later successfully appeals to be disbarred. She informs Robert that she will abandon her law career in order to marry him.

== Cast ==
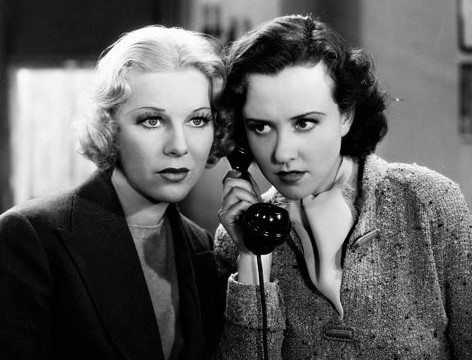
Farrell and Lindsay in The Law in Her Hands

- Margaret Lindsay as Mary Wentworth
- Glenda Farrell as Dorothy 'Dot' Davis
- Warren Hull as Asst. Dist. Atty. Robert Mitchell
- Lyle Talbot as Frank 'Legs' Gordon
- Eddie Acuff as Eddie O'Malley
- Dick Purcell as Marty
- Al Shean as Franz
- Addison Richards as William McGuire
- Joseph Crehan as Dist. Atty. Thomas Mallon

== Reception ==
In a contemporary review for The New York Times, critic Thomas M. Pryor called the script "a narrative which, despite any amount of ingenious fabrication, could hardly aspire to be more than a congenial triviality."

Critic Philip K. Scheuer of the Los Angeles Times wrote that "[p]atrons left voting it a fair hour's divertissement," with the plot twist in which Mary petitions for her own disbarment "although far-fetched, passingly clever." However, Scheuer added: "William Clemens has directed with a rather noticeable lack of pace, the players never rising above mere adequacy in their performances."
