= Nancy Drew... Trouble Shooter =

1939 film by William Clemens

- Theatrical release poster
- Directed by: William Clemens
- Screenplay by: Kenneth Gamet
- Based on: Nancy Drew by Mildred Benson
- Produced by: Bryan Foy
- Starring: Bonita Granville; Frankie Thomas; John Litel; Aldrich Bowker; Charlotte Wynters; Edgar Edwards
- Cinematography: L. William O'Connell
- Edited by: Doug Gould
- Music by: Heinz Roemheld
- Production company: Warner Bros. Pictures
- Distributed by: Warner Bros. Pictures
- Release date: June 17, 1939
- Running time: 68 minutes
- Country: United States
- Language: English

Nancy Drew... Trouble Shooter is a 1939 American comedy film directed by William Clemens and written by Kenneth Gamet. The film stars Bonita Granville, Frankie Thomas, John Litel, Aldrich Bowker, Charlotte Wynters and Edgar Edwards. The film was released by Warner Bros. Pictures on June 17, 1939, and was the third film in the original Nancy Drew film series. It is a sequel to Nancy Drew... Detective (1938) and Nancy Drew... Reporter (1939) and was followed by Nancy Drew and the Hidden Staircase (1939).

== Plot ==
The Drews relocate to the country in an effort to clear a family friend of a murder charge. Upon arrival Carson Drew meets the charming Edna Gregory, triggering an intense jealousy in Nancy as she fears losing her father to the woman's advances. When the disinterested local sheriff refuses to consider the family friend's innocence, it's up to Nancy and reluctant boyfriend Ted Nickerson (whose family is vacationing at a nearby lake) to find the real murderer and clear “Uncle Matt’s” name.

This movie made it evident that Nancy and Ted started dating sometime during the gap between the events of the second and third movie.

== Cast ==
- Bonita Granville as Nancy Drew
- Frankie Thomas as Ted Nickerson
- John Litel as Carson Drew
- Aldrich Bowker as Matt Brandon
- Charlotte Wynters as Edna Gregory
- Edgar Edwards as 'Chuck' Marley
- Renie Riano as Effie Schneider
- Roger Imhof as Sheriff Barney Riggs
- Erville Alderson as Clint Griffith
- Willie Best as Apollo Johnson
- John Harron as Greenhouse Clerk
- Cliff Saum as First Deputy Sheriff
- Tom Wilson as Milt
- Glen Cavender as First Townsman (uncredited)
- Creighton Hale as Man in Sheriff's Office (uncredited)
- Leo White as Man in Sheriff's Office (uncredited)
