= Mona Bruns =

American actress (1899–2000)

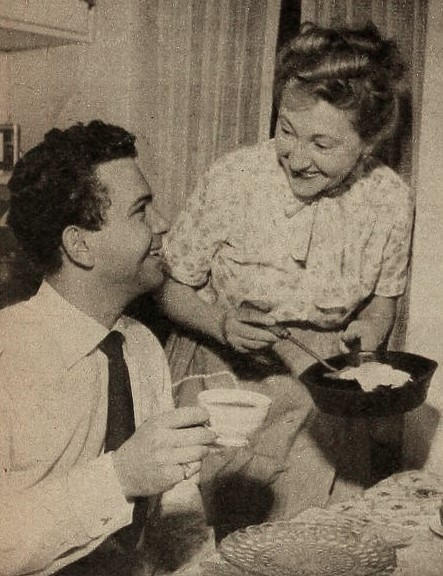
- Mona Bruns with Frankie Thomas in 1952
- Born: November 26, 1899
- Died: June 13, 2000 (aged 100); Los Angeles, California, U.S.
- Occupation: Actress
- Years active: 1934–1981
- Spouse: Frank M. Thomas
- Children: Frank M. Thomas, Jr.

Mona Bruns (November 26, 1899 – June 13, 2000) was an American actress on the stage, films, radio, and television. She appeared in such television series as Dr. Kildare, Little House on the Prairie, Green Acres, and Bonanza, among others

== Early years ==
Bruns debuted as an actress when she was 15 years old. She was the sister of actress Julia Bruns.

== Career ==
Bruns debuted in The Innocent Sinner, after which she acted for a year in stock theater. That was followed by a year in Capt. Kidd, Jr. She went on to act at the Greenwich Village Theater. In 1922 she began acting with the Bonstelle company in Buffalo, New York. She joined the Montclair Theatre Guild's company in October 1930.

She appeared on Broadway with her husband, Frank M. Thomas. She appeared in the 1934 Broadway play Wednesday's Child as Miss Chapman with her son, Frankie Thomas, playing "Bobby Phillips". He recreated this role in the 1934 film, Wednesday's Child, necessitating their move to Los Angeles in the 1930s, where she and her husband acted in several films also. For eight years, she played "Aunt Emily" in The Brighter Day. After the show ended, she was asked to create the role of Emily Hastings on NBC's Another World. She appeared on many popular television shows of the 1950s/60s.

== Personal life ==
Bruns and her husband, Frank M. Thomas, were the parents of actor Frankie Thomas.

== Death ==
She died in Los Angeles on June 13, 2000, at the age of 100, and is interred next to her husband, who also died at 100, at Forest Lawn Memorial Park, Hollywood, California.

== See also ==
- List of centenarians (actors, filmmakers and entertainers)
