= Romance of the Rio Grande (1941 film) =

1941 film by Herbert I. Leeds

- Theatrical release poster
- Directed by: Herbert I. Leeds
- Screenplay by: Harold Buchman; Samuel G. Engel
- Produced by: Sol M. Wurtzel
- Starring: Cesar Romero; Patricia Morison; Lynne Roberts; Ricardo Cortez; Chris-Pin Martin; Aldrich Bowker
- Cinematography: Charles G. Clarke
- Edited by: Fred Allen
- Music by: Cyril J. Mockridge
- Production company: 20th Century Fox
- Distributed by: 20th Century Fox
- Release date: January 17, 1941
- Running time: 72 minutes
- Country: United States
- Language: English

Romance of the Rio Grande is a 1941 American Western film directed by Herbert I. Leeds and written by Harold Buchman and Samuel G. Engel. The film stars Cesar Romero, Patricia Morison, Lynne Roberts, Ricardo Cortez, Chris-Pin Martin and Aldrich Bowker. The film was released on January 17, 1941, by 20th Century-Fox.

== Plot ==
Knowing that his greedy nephew Ricardo hopes to inherit his ranch, aging and ailing Don Fernando de Vega sends for his grandson, Carlos Hernandez, his preferred heir. The stagecoach carrying Carlos is attacked and he is shot by Carver, a gunman sent by Ricardo and his scheming sweetheart Rosita. As he lays injured, Carlos is found by the Cisco Kid, a bandit who sees the attack on the stagecoach. Struck by their uncanny resemblance, Cisco takes him to have the bullet taken out by a friend in a nearby hacienda, and he finds a letter from Don Fernando and decides to impersonate him.

Ricardo and Rosita are stunned to see "Carlos" alive, unaware the real one is off recovering from his bullet wound. Cisco makes romantic passes at both Rosita and the lovely Maria Cordova, goddaughter of the Don. Cisco comes to respect Don Fernando de Vega, and when he finds out the nephew is trying to take ranch by force, he goes against the nephew Ricardo. By the time his scheme is done, Ricardo and Rosita have shot one another in a jealous rage, while Carlos returns to claim his rightful inheritance and Maria.

== Cast ==
- Cesar Romero as Cisco Kid / Carlos
- Patricia Morison as Rosita
- Lynne Roberts as Maria Cordova
- Ricardo Cortez as Ricardo de Vega
- Chris-Pin Martin as Gordito
- Aldrich Bowker as Padre Martinez
- Joseph MacDonald as Carlos Hernandez
- Inez Palange as Mama Lopez
- Pedro de Cordoba as Don Fernando de Vega
- Ray Bennett as Henchman Carver
- Trevor Bardette as Henchman Manuel
- Tom London as U. S. Marshal
- Eva Puig as Marta

== Bibliography ==
- Fetrow, Alan G. Feature Films, 1940-1949: a United States Filmography. McFarland, 1994.
