= Frank Dewar =

American film editor

Frank DeWar
- Born: Francis Duncan DeWar Jr. December 3, 1907; Seattle, Washington, USA
- Died: May 27, 1969 (aged 61); Inyo County, California, USA
- Occupation: Film editor

Frank DeWar (1907–1969) was an American film editor who worked in Hollywood during the 1930s and 1940s.

== Biography ==
Frank was born in Seattle, Washington, to Francis DeWar Sr. (a native of Antwerp) and Mercedes Earle. The family soon relocated to Los Angeles, where Francis Sr. eventually became a prominent member of law enforcement there before dying in a 1932 plane crash.

Frank married Zelma Kennedy (niece of former Texas Gov. Ma Ferguson) in 1928; they had three children together. The pair split in 1939, and Frank was linked to actress Ann Sheridan in newspaper reports. His last known credit as a film editor was on 1942's The Right Timing.

== Selected filmography ==
- The Right Timing (1942)
- Water Sports (1941)
- Big Bill Tilden (1941)
- Diary of a Racing Pigeon (1940)
- Famous Movie Dogs (1940)
- Pony Express Days (1940)
- Dogs You Seldom See (1940)
- American Saddle Horses (1939)
- Pride of the Blue Grass (1939)
- Nancy Drew... Reporter (1939)
- King of the Underworld (1939)
- Penrod's Double Trouble (1938)
- He Couldn't Say No (1938)
- West of Shanghai (1937)
- Alcatraz Island (1937)
- White Bondage (1937)
- Public Wedding (1937)
- Under Southern Stars (1937)
- Guns of the Pecos (1937)
- Fugitive in the Sky (1936)
- The Sunday Round-Up (1936)
- Echo Mountain (1936)
- The Song of a Nation (1936)
- Changing of the Guard (1936)
- Hollywood Newsreel (1934)
