= William Clemens (film director) =

American film director (1905–1980)

- Born: September 10, 1905; Saginaw, Michigan, United States
- Died: April 29, 1980 (aged 74); Los Angeles, California, United States
- Occupation: Film director

William Clemens (September 10, 1905 – April 29, 1980) was an American film director.

Born in Saginaw, Michigan, Clemens began his Hollywood career as a film editor in 1931. His first directing project was Man Hunt in 1936. His major credits include On Dress Parade with the Dead End Kids, two Perry Mason mysteries (The Case of the Velvet Claws and The Case of the Stuttering Bishop), three films featuring detective Tom Lawrence, a.k.a. "The Falcon", four films based on the Nancy Drew series, and Calling Philo Vance in 1940. Clemens' final project was The Thirteenth Hour in 1947.

He died in Los Angeles, California in 1980.

== Complete filmography ==
=== As director ===
- Man Hunt (1936)
- The Law in Her Hands (1936)
- The Case of the Velvet Claws (1936)
- Down the Stretch (1936)
- Here Comes Carter (1936)
- The Sunday Round-Up (1936 short)
- Once a Doctor (1937)
- The Case of the Stuttering Bishop (1937)
- Talent Scout (1937)
- The Footloose Heiress (1937)
- Missing Witnesses (1937)
- Accidents Will Happen (1938)
- Torchy Blane in Panama (1938)
- Mr. Chump (1938)
- Nancy Drew... Detective (1938)
- Devil's Island (1939)
- Nancy Drew... Reporter (1939)
- Nancy Drew... Trouble Shooter (1939)
- Nancy Drew and the Hidden Staircase (1939)
- On Dress Parade (1939), starring the Dead End Kids
- Calling Philo Vance (1940)
- King of the Lumberjacks (1940)
- She Couldn't Say No (1940)
- Knockout (1941)
- The Night of January 16th (1941)
- Night in New Orleans (1942)
- Sweater Girl (1942)
- Lady Bodyguard (1943)
- The Falcon in Danger (1943)
- The Falcon and the Co-eds (1943)
- The Falcon Out West (1944)
- Crime by Night (1944)
- Musical Shipmates (1946 short)
- The Thirteenth Hour (1947)

=== As editor ===
- Freighters of Destiny (1931)
- The Saddle Buster (1932)
- Ghost Valley (1932)
- Beyond the Rockies (1932)
- Ride Him, Cowboy (1932)
- Haunted Gold (1932)
- The Telegraph Trail (1933)
- Somewhere in Sonora (1933)
- The Man from Monterey (1933)
- From Headquarters (1933)
- Easy to Love (1934)
- Journal of a Crime (1934)
- Dr. Monica (1934)
- Kansas City Princess (1934)
- Happiness Ahead (1934)
- Devil Dogs of the Air (1935)
- Oil for the Lamps of China (1935)
- Page Miss Glory (1935)
- I Found Stella Parish (1935)
- The Murder of Dr. Harrigan (1936)

=== As producer ===
- King of the Lumberjacks (1940) (uncredited)
