= Code of the Streets =

1939 film by Harold Young

- Directed by: Harold Young
- Written by: Arthur T. Horman
- Produced by: Burt Kelly
- Starring: The Little Tough Guys; Frankie Thomas; Harry Carey
- Cinematography: Elwood Bredell
- Edited by: Maurice Wright
- Music by: Frank Skinner; Charles Previn
- Distributed by: Universal Studios
- Release date: April 14, 1939
- Running time: 72 minutes
- Country: United States
- Language: English

Code of the Streets is a 1939 Universal Studios film starring The Little Tough Guys.

== Plot ==
Convicted on circumstantial evidence, Tommy Shay, a young product of the Front Street slums, is sentenced to die for the murder of police lieutenant Carson. When Denver Collins, Tommy's only alibi, mysteriously disappears, Tommy's younger brother Danny and his gang of alley kids determine to find a way to save Tommy from the electric chair. Lieutenant Lewis, Tommy's arresting officer, also believes that the boy is innocent and tries to get the case reopened. For his efforts, Lewis is demoted to patrolman, prompting his son Bob, a radio bug with an ambition to become a detective, to initiate his own investigation by which he hopes to find the real murderer and reinstate his father.

While searching for Collins on Front Street, Bob meets Danny and after he fibs that his father is a gangster, the boys join forces to track down Carson's killer. Acting on a tip, Danny and Bob visit a gambling club operated by Chick Foster and warn Foster that the police have reopened the Carson murder case and are looking for Denver Collins. In response, Foster begins to act strangely, giving the boys a look at his henchman, Halstead, whom they suspect is Collins.

When the boys discover that Bob is really a cop's son, they beat him up but have a change of heart upon learning that Bob's father was arrested while trying to help Tommy. Joining forces once again, the boys locate Halstead's hideout and lure Foster to the spot with a phony telegram. Eavesdropping by means of a Dictaphone, they learn that Halstead is really Collins and that he was hired by Foster to kill Carson. Overcome with fear, Halstead demands that Foster pay him off, and in the ensuing argument, Foster kills Halstead and hurries back to his club. Refusing to give up, Bob follows Foster and, after connecting a microphone attached to a radio in Foster's office, broadcasts a fake news flash telling how Halstead made a full confession before his death. Attempting to escape, Foster hails a cab in the alley which has been commandeered by Danny and the gang. After the boys force a confession from Foster, Officer Lewis arrives to arrest the gambler, and all ends happily as Tommy is freed, Lewis is reinstated as lieutenant, and the kids decide to go straight.

== Cast ==
=== The Little Tough Guys ===
- Harris Berger as Sailor
- Hally Chester as Murphy
- Charles Duncan as Monk
- David Gorcey as Yap
- William Benedict as Trouble

=== Additional cast ===
- Harry Carey as Detective Lieutenant John Lewis
- Frankie Thomas as Bob Lewis
- James McCallion as Danny Shay
- Juanita Quigley as Cynthia
- El Brendel as Mickhail 'Micky' Bjorgulfsen
- Leon Ames as 'Chick' Foster
- Paul Fix as Tommy Shay
- Marc Lawrence as Henchman Halstead/Denver Collins
- Dorothy Arnold as Mildred
- Stanley Hughes as Young man
- Eddy Chandler as Second guard
- James Flavin as Doorman
- Monte Montague as Lieutenant Carson
- William Rupel as Police Lieutenant Welles
- Wade Boteler as Reception guard
- Pat Flaherty as Visiting guard
