= Aldrich Bowker =

American actor

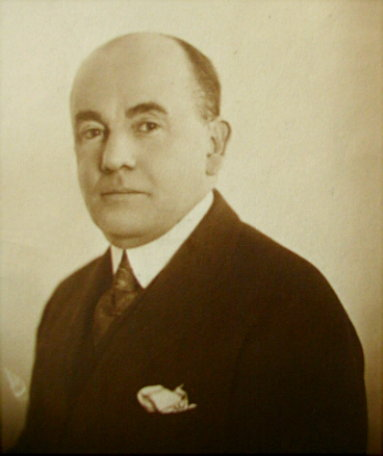
- Born: January 1, 1875; Ashby, Massachusetts
- Died: March 21, 1947 (aged 72); San Bernardino, California
- Occupation: Actor
- Years active: ? – 1942

Aldrich Bowker (January 1, 1875 – March 21, 1947) was an American stage and film actor.

== Biography ==
Bowker was born in Ashby, Massachusetts. He graduated from Fitchburg High School. His debut came in Boston in a stage adaptation of The Christian, by Hall Caine.

He was a long-time stage performer in Chicago and Cincinnati, and in summer stock at amusement park Whalom Park in Lunenburg, Massachusetts. Bowker was a pioneer in "open air" theatre at Whalom Park and at his summer home in Ashburnham, where other performers were frequent guests, including Ainsworth Arnold and Bette Davis.

Between 1912 and 1938 he was active on Broadway. Notable stage plays he performed in were The High Road (1912), A Night in Avignon (1919), You Can't Take It With You (1936) and 200 Were Chosen (1936).

Between 1939 and 1942 he appeared in about 25 films, including Ball of Fire (1941).

Bowker died at Patton State Hospital in San Bernardino, California, from arteriosclerosis and senility.

== Partial filmography ==
- Nancy Drew... Trouble Shooter (1939) as Matt Brandon
- Waterfront (1939) as Father Dunn
- Torchy Blane... Playing with Dynamite (1939) as Judge Hershey
- These Glamour Girls (1939) as Charlie, the Counterman (uncredited)
- Everybody's Hobby (1939) as Uncle Bert Leslie
- Angels Wash Their Faces (1939) as Turnkey
- No Place to Go (1939) as Heffernan
- Pride of the Blue Grass (1939) as Judge
- On Dress Parade (1939) as Father Ryan
- Joe and Ethel Turp Call on the President (1939) as Mike O'Brien
- Abe Lincoln in Illinois (1940) as Judge Bowling Green
- It All Came True (1940) as Father McDuffy (uncredited)
- Those Were the Days! (1940) as Judge Squire Jennings
- Susan and God (1940) as Patrick
- Jennie (1940) as Dr. Hildebrand
- Romance of the Rio Grande (1940) as Padre Martinez
- Meet John Doe (1941) as Pop Dwyer (uncredited)
- Pot o' Gold (1941) as Judge Mike Murray (uncredited)
- The Wagons Roll at Night (1941) as Mr. Williams
- Love Crazy (1941) as Jimmy, the Doorman (uncredited)
- Ball of Fire (1941) as Justice of the Peace
- I Was Framed (1942) as Dr. Phillip Black
- Mississippi Gambler (1942) as Judd Higgins, Mississippi Newspaper Editor
- The Major and the Minor (1942) as Reverend Doyle
- I Married a Witch (1942) as Justice of the Peace (final film role)
