= Missing Witnesses =

1937 film by William Clemens

- Theatrical release poster
- Directed by: William Clemens
- Screenplay by: Kenneth Gamet; Don Ryan
- Produced by: Bryan Foy
- Starring: John Litel; Dick Purcell; Jean Dale; Sheila Bromley; Ben Welden; William Haade
- Cinematography: Sidney Hickox
- Edited by: Frederick Richards
- Music by: Bernhard Kaun
- Production company: Warner Bros. Pictures
- Distributed by: Warner Bros. Pictures
- Release date: December 11, 1937
- Running time: 61 minutes
- Country: United States
- Language: English

Missing Witnesses is a 1937 American crime film directed by William Clemens and written by Kenneth Gamet and Don Ryan. The film stars John Litel, Dick Purcell, Jean Dale, Sheila Bromley, Ben Welden and William Haade. The film was released by Warner Bros. on December 11, 1937.

== Cast ==
- John Litel as Inspector Lane
- Dick Purcell as 'Bull' Regan
- Jean Dale as Mary Norton
- Sheila Bromley as Gladys Wagner
- Ben Welden as Wagner
- William Haade as Emmet White
- Raymond Hatton as 'Little Joe' Macey
- Harland Tucker as Ward Sturgis
- Jack Mower as Detective Butler
- Jack Harron as Harris
- Michael Mark as Hartman
- Earl Gunn as Chivvy Predo
- Louis Natheaux as Heinie Dodds
