= Wednesday's Child (film) =

1934 film by John S. Robertson

- Directed by: John S. Robertson; Ray Lissner (assistant)
- Screenplay by: Willis Goldbeck
- Based on: Wednesday's Child by Leopold L. Atlas
- Produced by: Pandro S. Berman
- Starring: Karen Morley; Edward Arnold; Frankie Thomas; Robert Shayne; Frank Conroy
- Cinematography: Harold Wenstrom
- Edited by: George Hively
- Music by: Max Steiner
- Production company: RKO Pictures
- Distributed by: RKO Pictures
- Release date: October 26, 1934
- Running time: 68 minutes
- Country: United States
- Language: English

Wednesday's Child is a 1934 American drama film directed by John S. Robertson and written by Willis Goldbeck, based on the 1934 play Wednesday's Child by Leopold L. Atlas. The film stars Karen Morley, Edward Arnold, Frankie Thomas, Robert Shayne and Frank Conroy. The film was released on October 26, 1934, by RKO Pictures. The play was later adapted to film again as the 1946 RKO film Child of Divorce.

== Plot ==
Ten-year-old Bobby Phillips and a group of friends see Bobby's mother, Kathryn, kissing a man who is not her husband. Despite serious concerns about Bobby, a divorce ensues and Bobby, although thoroughly disenchanted with his mother, is sent away with her where month after month despite all her efforts he grows more depressed, dreaming of reunification with his beloved father, Ray. On returning to his father at vacation, he finds him preoccupied with an impending second marriage. Bobby suffers a serious breakdown but is nevertheless packed off to military school. Later, visiting the school, his parents overhear Bobby and his roommate, also a child of divorce, discussing how they are on their own now. With the mother's blessing, the father decides to cancel his upcoming marriage and take Bobby back home where the two of them can live together happily.

== Cast ==
- Karen Morley as Kathryn Phillips
- Edward Arnold as Ray Phillips
- Frankie Thomas as Bobby Phillips
- Robert Shayne as Howard Benson
- Frank Conroy as the judge
- Shirley Grey as Louise
- Paul Stanton as Keyes
- David Durand as Charles
- Richard Barbee as Dr. Stirling
- Frank M. Thomas as attorney for the defense
- Mona Bruns as the nurse
- Elsa Janssen as Martha
