= Westward Passage =

1932 film

- Theatrical release poster
- Directed by: Robert Milton
- Screenplay by: Bradley King; Humphrey Pearson
- Based on: Westward Passage; 1931 novel by Margaret Ayer Barnes
- Produced by: David O. Selznick; Harry Joe Brown (associate)
- Starring: Ann Harding; Laurence Olivier; ZaSu Pitts; Irving Pichel
- Cinematography: Lucian Andriot
- Edited by: Charles Craft
- Music by: Max Steiner
- Production company: RKO Radio Pictures
- Distributed by: RKO Radio Pictures
- Release date: May 27, 1932 (US)
- Running time: 73 minutes
- Country: United States
- Language: English

Westward Passage is a 1932 American pre-Code drama film directed by Robert Milton and starring Ann Harding, Laurence Olivier, ZaSu Pitts and Irving Pichel. The screenplay concerns a woman who falls in love and marries, but soon discovers how unpleasant her new husband is. The film marked Olivier's second major role in the United States. It was not a commercial or critical success, and Olivier did not make another film in America until 1939 when he starred in Wuthering Heights. The film recorded a loss of $250,000.

== Plot ==
Newlyweds Olivia and Nick Allen struggle to keep their relationship afloat through personal disagreements. Nick lacks recognition for his works as an independent writer; hence, he is unable to support Olivia and their young daughter. These difficulties eventually lead to a divorce, the last they will see each other for many years. Six years after their divorce, Olivia lives a stable life with her husband, Harry Ottendorf, and her daughter, Little Olivia. Meanwhile, Nick has made a successful and rewarding career in writing but still yearns to be with Olivia. When the two board the same ship returning from Europe to the United States, Olivia is torn between the love of her kindly husband and the attempt by her former husband to rekindle the passion they once shared.

== Cast ==
- Ann Harding as Olivia Allen Ottendorf
- Laurence Olivier as Nick Allen
- ZaSu Pitts as Mrs. Truesdale
- Irving Pichel as Harry Ottendorf
- Juliette Compton as Henrietta
- Irene Purcell as Baroness Diana von Stael
- Emmett King as Mr. Ottendorf
- Florence Roberts as Mrs. Ottendorf
- Ethel Griffies as Lady Caverly
- Bonita Granville as Little Olivia
- Don Alvarado as Count Felipe DeLatorie
- Florence Lake as Elmer's wife
- Edgar Kennedy as Elmer
- Herman Bing as The Dutchman
- Nance O'Neil as Mrs. von Stael
- Joyce Compton as Lillie
- Julie Haydon as Bridesmaid

(cast list as per AFI database)

== Reception ==
The film was considered a commercial failure, despite its relative popularity. Adapted from Margaret Ayer Barnes' novel Westward Passage, the film was criticized for its lack of logical progression and thematic development when compared to the novel.

Olivier's brash delivery and mannerisms garnered mixed reviews, and the critical reception largely delayed the mainstream success Olivier would garner in later films. Some believed that poor dialogue hindered the development and likability of essential characters, including Olivia Ottendorf. Others added Westward Passage to their list of empowering and emotional Ann Harding films.
