= Cambridge Grant Historic District =

Historic district in Massachusetts, United States

- U.S. National Register of Historic Places
- U.S. Historic district
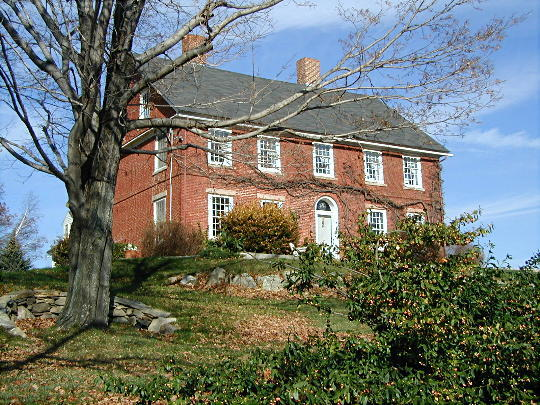
- John Adams, Jr. House in 2010

- Location within Massachusetts Location within the United States
- Location: Ashburnham, Massachusetts
- Coordinates: 42°38′41″N 71°51′44″W
- Built: 1766
- Architectural style: Federal
- NRHP reference No.: 01000626
- Added to NRHP: August 20, 2001

The Cambridge Grant Historic District is a 322-acre (1.30 km^{2}) historic district located on Russell Hill Road and Wilker Road in Ashburnham, Massachusetts, at an elevation of 1240–1300 feet above sea level. It was added to the National Register of Historic Places in 2001.

== Early history ==
The 1,000-acre (4.0 km^{2}) district was granted to the town of Cambridge in 1734 as compensation for that town's responsibility in maintaining the first bridge across the Charles River connecting Boston to towns to the north, built in 1662. Known as the Cambridge Bridge Farm, it remained unsettled until 1770, when John Adams of Menotomy (West Cambridge Parish) became the first settler with his new bride, Joanna Munroe. He was soon followed by other family members, including his father, Thomas Adams, Sr., a brother, Thomas Adams, Jr., a sister, Lucretia Adams Wetherbee, and a nephew, Thomas Russell. A community of interrelated settlers from the Adams and Russell families of Menotomy evolved. The principal occupation of many of the early settlers was the tanning of goat or sheep skins into Morocco leather. This Adams family had been early settlers in West Cambridge and were not related to the Presidential Adams family of Braintree.

== Revolutionary period ==
The Adams and Russell families were closely connected to Revolutionary figures in Menotomy and Lexington. Joanna Munroe, wife of first settler John Adams (later known as the Centenarian), was the sister of Ebenezer Munroe, a Minuteman who may have fired the first shot on the British on Lexington green, April 19, 1775, in the Battles of Lexington and Concord. and of Isaac Munroe, who was slain by the British that day. Ebenezer Munroe later removed to Ashburnham. Early settler Thomas Russell (a nephew of John Adams) was a second cousin of Jason Russell, owner of the Jason Russell House, who was killed in his kitchen in Menotomy by enraged British regulars on their return to Boston following their engagement at Concord.

Shortly after the Battle of Lexington and Concord, the first settlers were joined by Ethan Wetherbee and his wife, Lucretia Adams, a sister of John Adams the Centenarian. Wetherbee had been keeper of the Black Horse Tavern in Menotomy, where the Massachusetts Committee of Safety and Committee of Supplies had met; by locking the tavern door he had saved Charles Lee, Azor Orne and Elbridge Gerry from capture by British troops passing through on their way to Concord on the night of April 18–19, 1775.

== Twentieth century ==
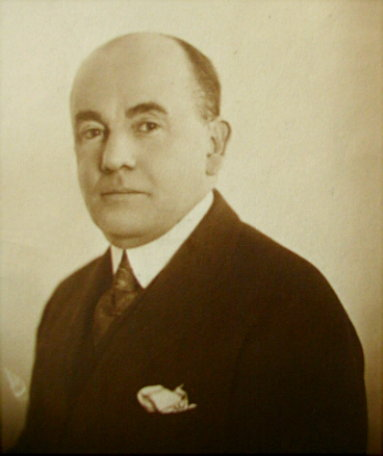
Aldrich Bowker

In the early twentieth century, the district became an active summer arts community. Home to writers and artists, it was noted for popular outdoor theatrical performances sponsored by the successful stage actor, Aldrich Bowker (1875–1947), one of its summer residents. Bowker succeeded Henry Travers in the role of Grandpa in George S. Kaufman's You Can't Take It with You on Broadway, and played it for over 500 consecutive performances in New York and Chicago. When Kaufman won the Pulitzer Prize for the play in 1937, Bowker was the presenter. He went on to play character roles in 25 motion pictures between 1939 and 1942, including The Major and the Minor and Abe Lincoln in Illinois. Aldrich Bowker's brother, Frank Bowker, also a district resident, was the author of Ashby Four Corners, a play about life in a small New England town whose setting is Russell Hill. Clara Burbank (1862–1927), a successful still life artist, was a neighbor in the district, as was Amy L. Burbank (1875–1948), a popular New England landscape painter.

== Significance ==
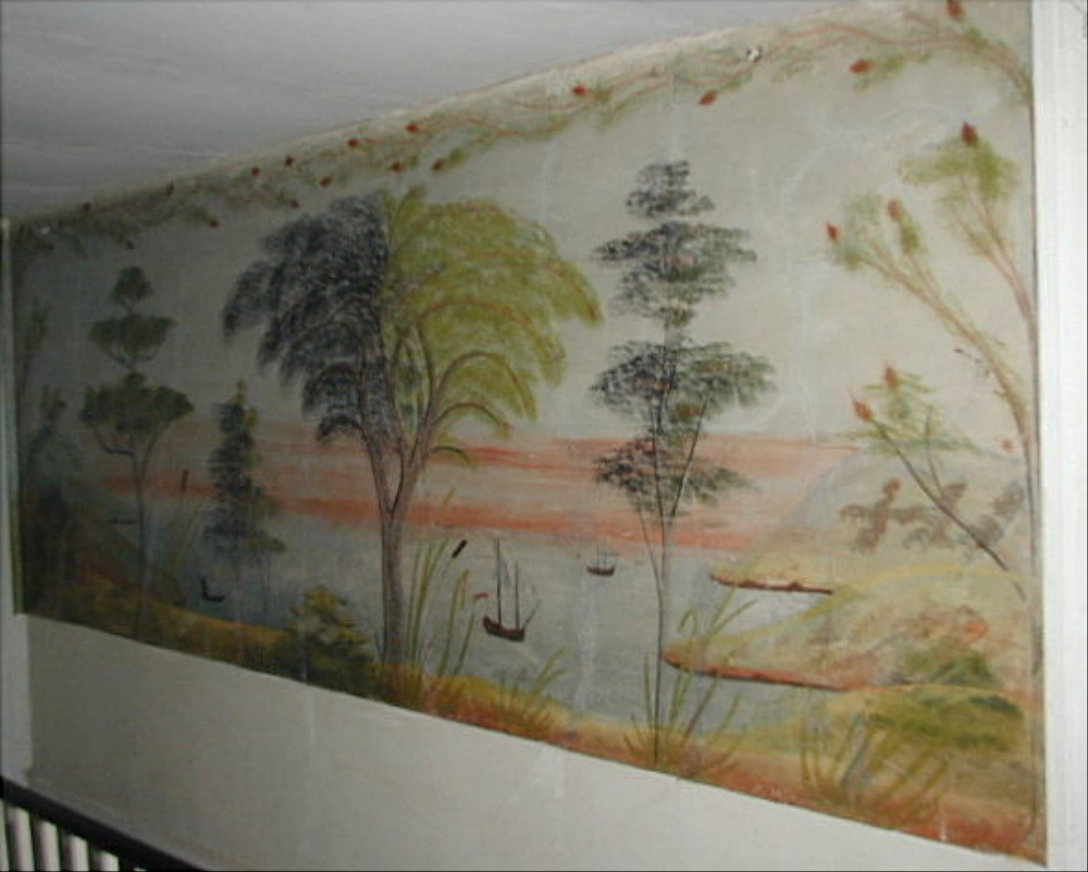
Rufus Porter mural

Such one-or-two family neighborhoods constituted a familiar settlement pattern in Massachusetts and Maine land grants in the eighteenth century, but most are no longer recognizable due to building loss and subsequent development. Cambridge Grant is nearly unique in retaining a significant number of early homes and outbuildings in their original settings, with almost no encroachment from later building episodes. Today the Cambridge Grant Historic District contains seven Federal Architecture period homes dating from 1787/88 to 1834, together with barns and outbuildings, plus the Russell-Burbank family cemetery (1848). In addition, the Walter Russell House contains two of the earliest known murals by an itinerant wall painter of the Rufus Porter school.

== Notable residents ==
- Isaac Hill (1788–1851), a grandson of John Adams the Centenarian, New Hampshire State Representative, New Hampshire State Senator, Comptroller of the United States Treasury in the Andrew Jackson administration, U.S. Senator from NH, and Governor of New Hampshire
- Ivers Adams (1808–1890), Massachusetts State Representative, 1851
- Samuel G. Adams (1825–1886), Superintendent of Police for the City of Boston
- Ivers Whitney Adams (born 1838), founder of the Boston Red Stockings, first professional baseball team in Boston
- Melvin Ohio Adams (1847–1920), lawyer for Lizzie Borden
- Luther B. Adams (born 1829) and Andrew Jackson Adams (1828–1911), officers of the Boston Chair Manufacturing Company of Ashburnham, an aggressive innovator in mass production techniques and one of the three largest chair manufacturers in the United States in the third quarter of the nineteenth century
