= Katherine Warren =

American actress (1905–1965)

- Born: Katharine C. Warren; July 12, 1905; Monroe, Michigan, U.S.
- Died: July 17, 1965 (aged 60); Los Angeles, California, U.S.
- Occupation: Actress
- Years active: 1930–1963
- Spouse: Clark Chesney (m. 1938; died 1951)
- Children: 1

Katherine Warren (born Katharine C. Warren; July 12, 1905 – July 17, 1965) was an American film and television actress. She is best known for her roles in the 1949 film All the King's Men, the 1951 film The Prowler, and the 1954 film The Caine Mutiny.

== Career ==
Born in Monroe, Michigan, and raised in Lake Forest, Illinois, Warren was the daughter of Frank B. Warren and Lucia M. Landon. She attended Dana Hall Boarding School and Pine Manor Junior College. After making her 1927 stage debut at the Repertory Theatre of Boston, Warren continued her studies with the Stuart Walker Repertory Company in Cincinnati.

Prior to her career in films and TV, she was a stage actress on and off Broadway, in summer stock, and many theatrical venues throughout the US. Her signature role was as Roxanne in Cyrano de Bergerac opposite Walter Hampden in the title role. She married Vernon (aka Clark) Tharp Chesney in 1938. The couple had a son, David, in 1947. In 1948, due to her husband's illness, the family moved from New York City to Los Angeles where she began her movie and TV career. Clark Chesney died on January 4, 1951, at the City of Hope in Duarte, California.

She appeared under her maiden name (Katharine Warren, which she spelled as shown here) in over 30 films and dozens of television programs including the TV series Alfred Hitchcock Presents (three episodes, 1956–1957) and Bonanza (1961) and the films Jailhouse Rock (1957), The Glenn Miller Story (1954), All the King's Men (1949), and as the mother of Ensign Willie Keith in the big-budget war drama The Caine Mutiny (1954).

She also coached aspiring young talent for Universal City Studios (then Universal International) in the early to mid-60s, and taught drama to young people at Brown Gables Conservatory in Brentwood, California.

Her final television performances came on the western series Laramie between 1960 and 1963.

== Personal life and death ==
From December 1938 until his death in 1951, Warren was married to fellow actor Vernon Clark Chesney. They had one child, a son.

On July 17, 1965, Warren died at age 60 in Los Angeles.

== Filmography ==
Year	Title	Role	Notes
1949	Mary Ryan, Detective	Mrs. Sawyer	
1949	All the King's Men	Mrs. Burden	
1949	Tell It to the Judge	Kitty Lawton	
1949	The Story of Molly X	Norma Calvert	
1949	And Baby Makes Three	Miss Ellis – Nurse	Uncredited
1950	Three Secrets	Mrs. Connors	
1950	Harriet Craig	Dr. Lambert	Uncredited
1950	Mystery Submarine	Mrs. Weber	
1951	Three Guys Named Mike	Mrs. Scott Bellemy	Uncredited
1951	The Prowler	Grace Crocker	
1951	Dear Brat	Mrs. Clark	Uncredited
1951	Lorna Doone	Sarah Ridd	Uncredited
1951	Night Into Morning	Mrs. Margaret Andersen	
1951	Force of Arms	Maj. Waldron	
1951	The Tall Target	Mrs. Gibbons	Uncredited
1951	The People Against O'Hara	Mrs. William Sheffield	
1951	The Lady Pays Off	Dean Bessie Howell	
1952	Scandal Sheet	Mrs. Allison	Uncredited
1952	This Woman Is Dangerous	Mrs. Millican	
1952	Talk About a Stranger	Mrs. Dorothy Mahler	Uncredited
1952	Paula	Mary	Uncredited
1952	Washington Story	Mrs. Birch	
1952	Son of Ali Baba	Princess Karma	Uncredited
1952	Flat Top	Dorothy's Mother	Uncredited
1952	The Steel Trap	Mrs. Kellogg	
1952	Battles of Chief Pontiac	Chia	
1952	The Star	Mrs. Ruth Morrison	Uncredited
1953	The Man Behind the Gun	Phoebe Sheldon	
1954	The Glenn Miller Story	Mrs. Burger	
1954	The Caine Mutiny	Mrs. Keith	
1954	The Country Girl	Theatregoer	Uncredited
1954	The Violent Men	Mrs. Vail	Uncredited
1954	The Bamboo Prison	Mother Rand	Voice, Uncredited
1956	Alfred Hitchcock Presents	Freda Wallingford	Season 1 Episode 23 ("Back for Christmas")
1956	Alfred Hitchcock Presents	Mother Edwards	Season 1 Episode 34 ("The Hidden Thing")
1956	Inside Detroit	Ethel Linden	
1956	Fury at Gunsight Pass	Mrs. Boggs	
1957	Alfred Hitchcock Presents	Policewoman	Season 3 Episode 5 ("Silent Witness")
1957	Drango	Mrs. Scott	
1957	Jailhouse Rock	Mrs. Van Alden	Uncredited
1957	Zero Hour!	Mrs. Purdy	Uncredited
1960	I'll Give My Life	Dora Bradford	

== Broadway ==
- Three Times the Hour (1931) as Mrs. Lawrence M. Blake
- Wednesday's Child (1934) as Kathryn Phillips
- Blind Alley (1935) as Doris Shelby
- Cyrano de Bergerac (1936) as Roxane
