= Nancy Drew... Detective =

1938 film

- Theatrical release poster
- Directed by: William Clemens
- Screenplay by: Kenneth Garnet
- Based on: The Password to Larkspur Lane; 1933 novel by Carolyn Keene
- Produced by: Bryan Foy
- Starring: Bonita Granville; John Litel; James Stephenson; Frankie Thomas; Frank Orth; Helena Phillips Evans
- Cinematography: L. William O'Connell
- Edited by: Frank Magee
- Music by: Heinz Roemheld
- Production company: Warner Bros. Pictures
- Distributed by: Warner Bros. Pictures
- Release date: November 19, 1938
- Running time: 66 minutes
- Country: United States
- Language: English

Nancy Drew... Detective is a 1938 American mystery film directed by William Clemens and written by Kenneth Garnet. The film stars Bonita Granville, John Litel, James Stephenson, Frankie Thomas, Frank Orth and Helena Phillips Evans. The film was released by Warner Bros. Pictures on November 19, 1938.

== Plot ==
Wealthy Mary Eldredge (Helena Phillips Evans) decides to donate $250,000 (in 2020 purchase-power that would be $4.5 million) to her alma mater, where teenager Nancy Drew (Bonita Granville) is a student. When Mary doesn't deliver the check to the lawyer Carson Drew (John Litel), Nancy's father, and disappears, it seems as if she has backed out of her original intention. Nancy's classmates turn on her, annoyed that she had gotten their hopes up about getting a swimming pool for the school.

Nancy sets out to find out what really happened. Along the way, with the help of her neighbor and best friend Ted Nickerson (Frankie Thomas), she deals with the kidnapping of her family's doctor, a slow policeman, and an injured carrier pigeon.

At one point, Nancy and Ted hire a plane to look from the air for a house that fits some clues that they have collected. Planning to rescue Mary, they gain entry to the suspected location, Ted disguised as a nurse and Nancy as a widow. They find Mary but, during their attempted escape, all three are captured. Locked in a basement, Ted finds an old x-ray machine and uses it to produce radio and telephone interference, encoding it to send a call for help. Nancy's father and the police get the message and the gang that had kidnapped Mary is caught.

== Cast ==
- Bonita Granville as Nancy Drew
- John Litel as Carson Drew
- James Stephenson as Challon
- Frankie Thomas as Ted Nickerson (Ned Nickerson in the novel)
- Frank Orth as Captain Tweedy
- Helena Phillips Evans as Mary Eldredge
- Renie Riano as Effie Schneider
- Charles Trowbridge as Hollister
- Dick Purcell as Keiffer
- Edward Keane as Adam Thorne
- Mae Busch as Miss Tyson
- Jack Mower as Radio Station Technician (uncredited)

== Production ==
The plot is based on the 1933 novel The Password to Larkspur Lane written by Walter Karig as "Carolyn Keene".

This was the first of a series of Warner Bros. Nancy Drew films.

Three followed in 1939:

- Nancy Drew... Reporter, then
- Nancy Drew... Trouble Shooter, and ending with
- Nancy Drew and the Hidden Staircase.

All four were directed by William Clemens and featured Bonita Granville, John Litel as Nancy's father, and Frankie Thomas. Kenneth Gamet wrote the screenplays.
