= The Night of January 16th (film) =

1941 film by William Clemens

- Movie poster
- Directed by: William Clemens
- Screenplay by: Delmer Daves; Robert Pirosh; Eve Greene
- Based on: Night of January 16th by Ayn Rand
- Produced by: Sol C. Siegel
- Starring: Robert Preston; Ellen Drew; Nils Asther
- Cinematography: John J. Mescall
- Edited by: Ellsworth Hoagland
- Music by: Gerard Carbonara
- Production company: Paramount Pictures
- Distributed by: Paramount Pictures
- Release date: November 28, 1941
- Running time: 80 minutes
- Country: United States
- Language: English

The Night of January 16th is a 1941 American crime drama film directed by William Clemens, based on a 1934 play of the same name by Ayn Rand. The story follows Steve Van Ruyle (Robert Preston) and Kit Lane (Ellen Drew) as they investigate the apparent murder of Lane's boss, in an attempt to clear her as a suspect.

Metro-Goldwyn-Mayer optioned the film rights to the play in 1934 and hired Rand to work on the screenplay, but they did not move forward and the option lapsed. The rights were later resold, first to RKO Pictures, then to Paramount Pictures. Paramount brought in a new team of writers, and Rand played no role in the final production.

== Plot ==
Steve Van Ruyle (Robert Preston) is a sailor who inherits a position on the board of a company headed by Bjorn Faulkner (Nils Asther). The board discovers $20 million has disappeared from the company's funds, and demands answers from Faulkner. That night Faulkner meets with a man called Anton Haraba, and is apparently thrown from his penthouse balcony to his death. Faulkner's secretary, Kit Lane (Ellen Drew), enters the penthouse moments later, leading police to arrest her for Faulkner's murder. Van Ruyle decides to investigate the crime. Suspecting that Lane and Faulkner were embezzling the money together, he pays her bail so he can question her about the situation. They find Faulkner's diary, and the entries lead Van Ruyle to believe Lane is innocent. The district attorney (Paul Stanton) disagrees, and Lane goes to trial.

Van Ruyle attempts to prove Lane's innocence with fake evidence, but his ruse is discovered. The two flee with evidence from Faulkner's apartment, which they use to track down the mysterious Haraba. They trace him to a hotel in Havana, Cuba, where they discover that "Haraba" is a pseudonym being used by Faulkner, who has faked his own death. When Faulkner takes Lane captive, Van Ruyle rushes with police to Faulkner's room to rescue her. Faulkner is arrested, and Van Ruyle and Lane decide to get married.

== Cast ==
- Robert Preston as Steve Van Ruyle
- Ellen Drew as Kit Lane
- Nils Asther as Bjorn Faulkner
- Clarence Kolb as Tilton
- Willard Robertson as Inspector Donegan
- Cecil Kellaway as Oscar, the Drunk
- Donald Douglas as Attorney Polk
- Paul Stanton as the District Attorney
- Margaret Hayes as Nancy Wakefield

== Production ==
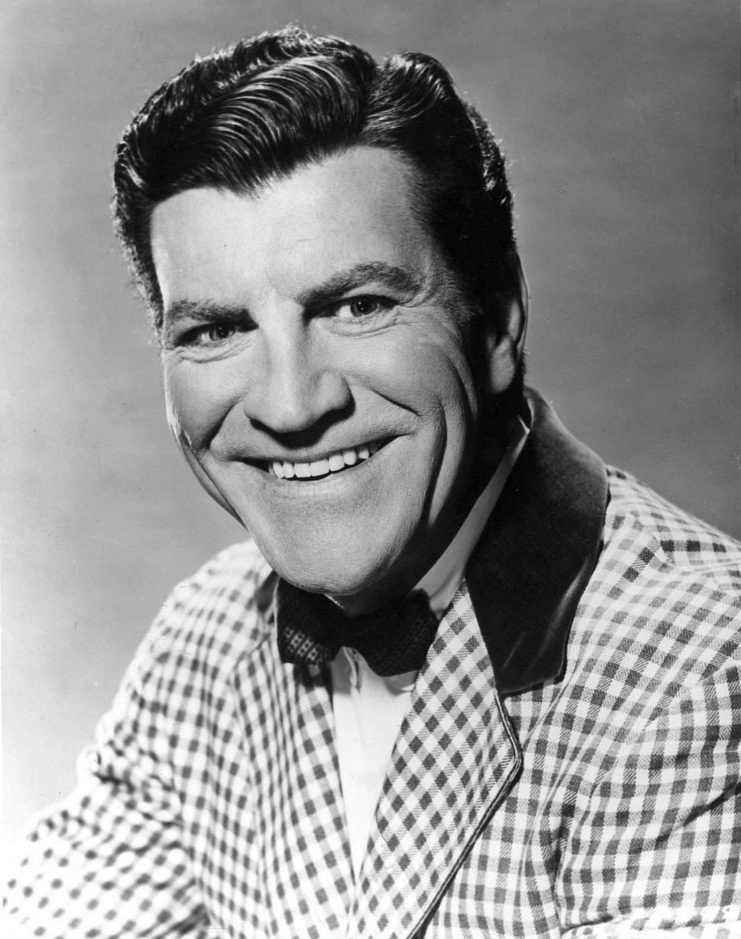
Robert Preston starred as Steve Van Ruyle.

The movie rights to the play were initially purchased by Metro-Goldwyn-Mayer (MGM) in October 1934 as a possible vehicle for Loretta Young. They hired Rand to write a screenplay, but the project was scrapped. After MGM's option expired, Al Woods, who was producing the play on Broadway, considered making a movie version through a production company of his own. Instead, in 1938 RKO Pictures bought the rights for $10,000, a fee split between Woods and Rand. RKO looked at Claudette Colbert and Lucille Ball as possibilities to star, but they also gave up on the adaptation. The rights were resold to Paramount Pictures in July 1939 for $35,000.

Rand did not participate in the production at Paramount. Three other writers (Delmer Daves, Robert Pirosh, and Eve Greene) were brought in to prepare a new screenplay. Paramount planned for the film to star Barbara Stanwyck and Don Ameche, who was to be loaned out by 20th Century Fox, where he was on contract. Ameche refused to take the part, which delayed the start of the production, causing Stanwyck to drop out. As a result, Ameche was suspended for two weeks by 20th Century Fox and sued by Paramount for $170,000 in damages. Paramount considered Paulette Goddard and Ray Milland for the roles before finally casting Drew and Asther.

The production used the working titles Private Secretary and Secrets of a Secretary, but the movie was released in 1941 as The Night of January 16th, following the title of the play. The play took place entirely in a courtroom, and its best-known feature was that it used a jury selected from members of the audience, who would decide the defendant's guilt or innocence at the end. This feature was impossible to reproduce in a movie, so the new screenplay altered the plot significantly, focusing on Steve Van Ruyle, a character that did not exist in the play. Unlike the play where Faulkner is already dead, in the movie he appears as a living character who is then apparently murdered. The name of the prime suspect, Faulkner's assistant, was changed from Karen Andre to Kit Lane, and the action is not focused on the courtroom. Rand claimed only a single line from her original dialog appeared in the movie, which she dismissed as a "cheap, trashy vulgarity".

== Reception ==
The film received little attention when it was released, and most of the reviews were negative. A review in Variety praised Drew's performance, but described the direction as "heavyhanded" and the plot as involving "an unbelievable set of coincidences".

== See also ==
- The Match King, another movie inspired by the same events as the play this movie is based on
