= Frankie Thomas =

American actor (1923–1965)

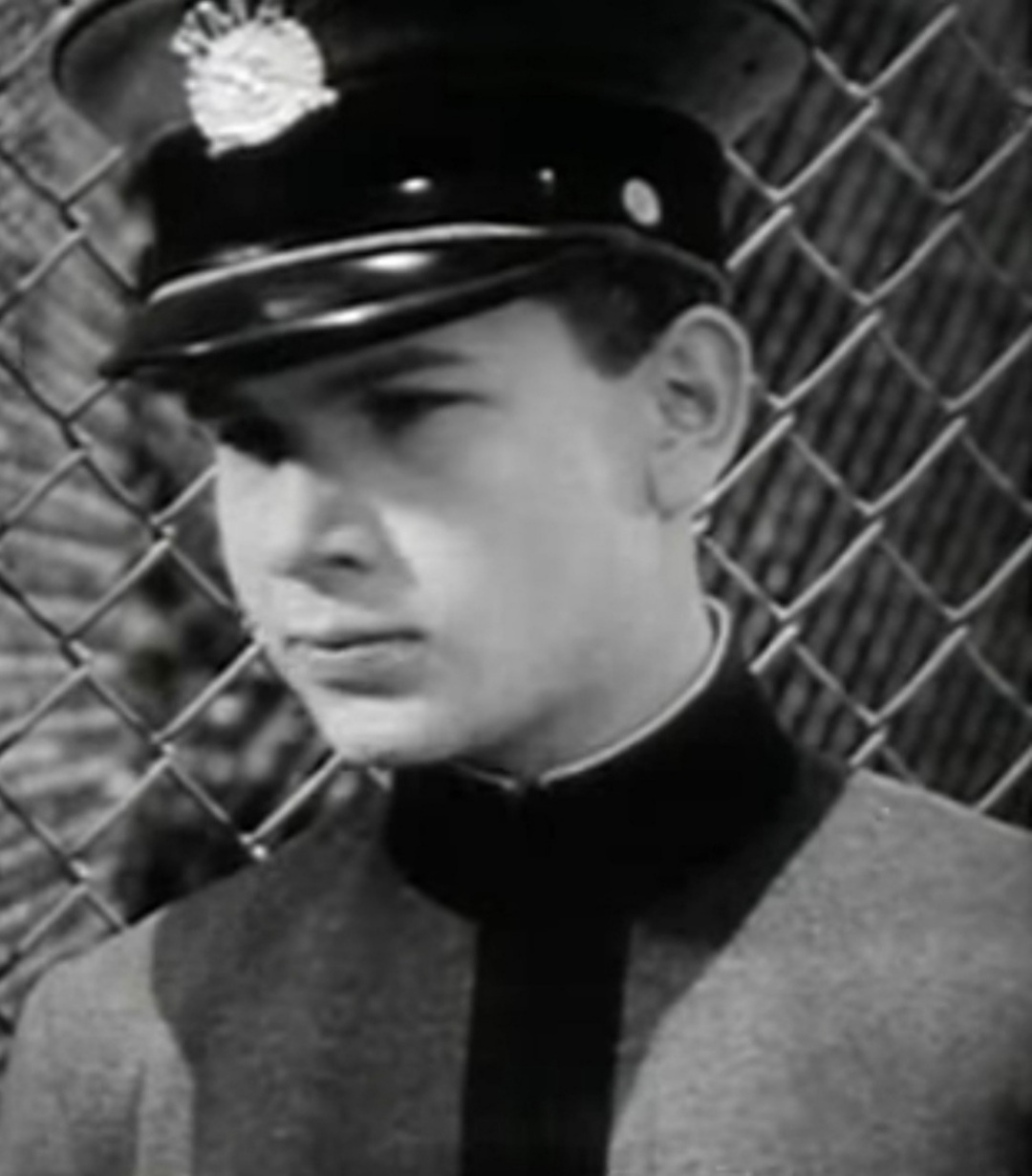
- Thomas in On Dress Parade (1939)
- Born: Frank Marion Thomas Jr. April 9, 1921; New York City, U.S.
- Died: May 11, 2006 (aged 85); Sherman Oaks, California, U.S.
- Other names: Frankie Thomas Jr. Frank M. Thomas Jr.
- Occupations: Actor; author; bridge-strategy expert
- Years active: 1932–1955
- Spouse: Virginia Thomas (died 1997)

Frank Marion Thomas Jr. (April 9, 1921 – May 11, 2006), was an American actor, author and bridge-strategy expert who played both lead and supporting roles on Broadway, in films, in post-World War II radio, and in early television. He was best known for his starring role in Tom Corbett, Space Cadet.

== Early years ==
Thomas was born in New York City to actors Frank M. Thomas and Mona Bruns. His uncle, Calvin Thomas, was also an actor.

Thomas portrayed a Kiowan youth in the Broadway play Carry Nation (1932). He appeared in six other Broadway plays between 1932 and 1936, including Little Ol' Boy, Thunder on the Left, Wednesday's Child, The First Legion, Remember the Day, and Seen But Not Heard.

Thomas's last "A" film was Boys' Town (1938) with Spencer Tracy and Mickey Rooney. Thomas was Freddy Fuller, Boys' Town's mayor, and was not asked to appear in the sequel, Men of Boys' Town (1941). He then appeared in a string of "B" films such as Little Tough Guys in Society and Nancy Drew... Detective (both 1938), Nancy Drew... Reporter, Code of the Streets, Nancy Drew… Trouble Shooter, The Angels Wash Their Faces, Nancy Drew and the Hidden Staircase, On Dress Parade and Invisible Stripes (all 1939).

In the summer of 1940, Thomas acted with the Guy Palmerton Players.

In 1941 he had small parts in Flying Cadets and One Foot in Heaven. His last film roles were small roles in Always in My Heart and The Major and the Minor (1942), where he played a military school cadet who flirted with Ginger Rogers' character.

== Death ==
Thomas died in 2006 at age 85 at a Sherman Oaks, California, hospital of respiratory failure, following a stroke. At his request, he was buried in his Space Cadet uniform. His wife, Virginia, had preceded him in death in 1997.

== Partial filmography ==
=== Film ===
Year	Title	Role	Notes
1934	Wednesday's Child	Bobby Phillips	
1935	A Dog of Flanders	Nello Daas	
1937	Tim Tyler's Luck	Tim Tyler	Serial
1938	Boys' Town	Freddie Fuller	
1938	Little Tough Guys in Society	Danny	
1939	Nancy Drew... Detective	Ted Nickerson	
1939	Nancy Drew... Reporter	Ted Nickerson	
1939	Code of the Streets	Bob Lewis	
1939	Nancy Drew… Trouble Shooter	Ted Nickerson	
1939	The Angels Wash Their Faces	Gabe Ryan	
1939	Nancy Drew and the Hidden Staircase	Ted Nickerson	
1939	On Dress Parade	Cadet Lt. Murphy	
1939	Invisible Stripes	Tommy	
1941	One Foot in Heaven	Hartzell Spence	
1941	Flying Cadets	Newton R. Adams / Ames	
1942	Always in My Heart	Martin Scott	
1942	The Major and the Minor	Cadet Osborne	

== Works ==
- Thomas, Frank (1973). Sherlock Holmes, Bridge Detective.
- Thomas, Frank (1975). Sherlock Holmes, Bridge Detective Returns.
- Thomas, Frank (1979). Sherlock Holmes and the Golden Bird. Pinnacle Books. ISBN 9780523406169.
- Thomas, Frank (1980). Sherlock Holmes and the Sacred Sword. Pinnacle Books. ISBN 9780523410135.
- Thomas, Frank (1984). Secret Cases of Sherlock Holmes.
- Thomas, Frank (1985). Sherlock Holmes and the Treasure Train.
- Thomas, Frank (1986). Sherlock Holmes and the Masquerade Murders.
- Thomas, Frank (1989). Sherlock Holmes and the Bizarre Alibi.
- Thomas, Frank (2000). Sherlock Holmes and the Panamanian Girls.
- Thomas, Frank (2002). Sherlock Holmes Mystery Tales.
- Thomas, Frank (2002). Secret Files of Sherlock Holmes.
