= Nancy Drew... Reporter =

1939 film

- Theatrical release poster
- Directed by: William Clemens
- Written by: Kenneth Gamet
- Based on: Nancy Drew by Mildred Benson
- Produced by: Bryan Foy; Hal B. Wallis; Jack L. Warner
- Starring: Bonita Granville; John Litel; Frankie Thomas; Mary Lee; Dickie Jones; Larry Williams
- Cinematography: Arthur Edeson
- Edited by: Frank DeWar
- Music by: Heinz Roemheld
- Production company: Warner Bros. Pictures
- Distributed by: Warner Bros. Pictures
- Release date: February 18, 1939
- Running time: 68 minutes
- Country: United States
- Language: English

Nancy Drew... Reporter is a 1939 American comedy-mystery film directed by William Clemens and written by Kenneth Gamet. The film stars Bonita Granville as Nancy Drew, John Litel, Frankie Thomas, Mary Lee, Dickie Jones and Larry Williams. The film was released by Warner Bros. Pictures on February 18, 1939. It is a sequel to Nancy Drew... Detective (1938) and was followed by Nancy Drew... Trouble Shooter (1939).

== Plot ==
Nancy Drew competed in the local newspaper's amateur reporter contest and won a month's work. During her inquest at the job, she attempts to clear a girl named Eula Denning of murder charges with the help of her long-suffering best friend Ted, and the two men from next door. Nancy rockets through a car chase, a song fest in a Chinese restaurant, a boxing bout, and a finale of whistling fireworks to catch the real killer. They find the evidence that will bring the real murderers to justice with the aid of Nancy's father.

== Cast ==
- Bonita Granville as Nancy Drew
- John Litel as Carson Drew
- Frankie Thomas as Ted Nickerson
- Mary Lee as Mary Nickerson
- Dickie Jones as Killer Parkins
- Larry Williams as Miles Lambert
- Betty Amann as Eula Denning
- Thomas E. Jackson as City Editor Bostwick
- Olin Howland as Sergeant Entwhistle
- Sheila Bromley as Bonnie Lucas
- Art Smith as News Editor
- Jimmy Conlin as Newspaper Morgue Librarian (uncredited)
- Charles Halton as Whitney (uncredited)
- Frank Mayo as Man Leaving Courthouse (uncredited)
- Jack Mower as Deputy Coroner (uncredited)
- Leo White as Newspaper Office Worker (uncredited)
