= Bryan Foy =

American film producer (1896–1977)

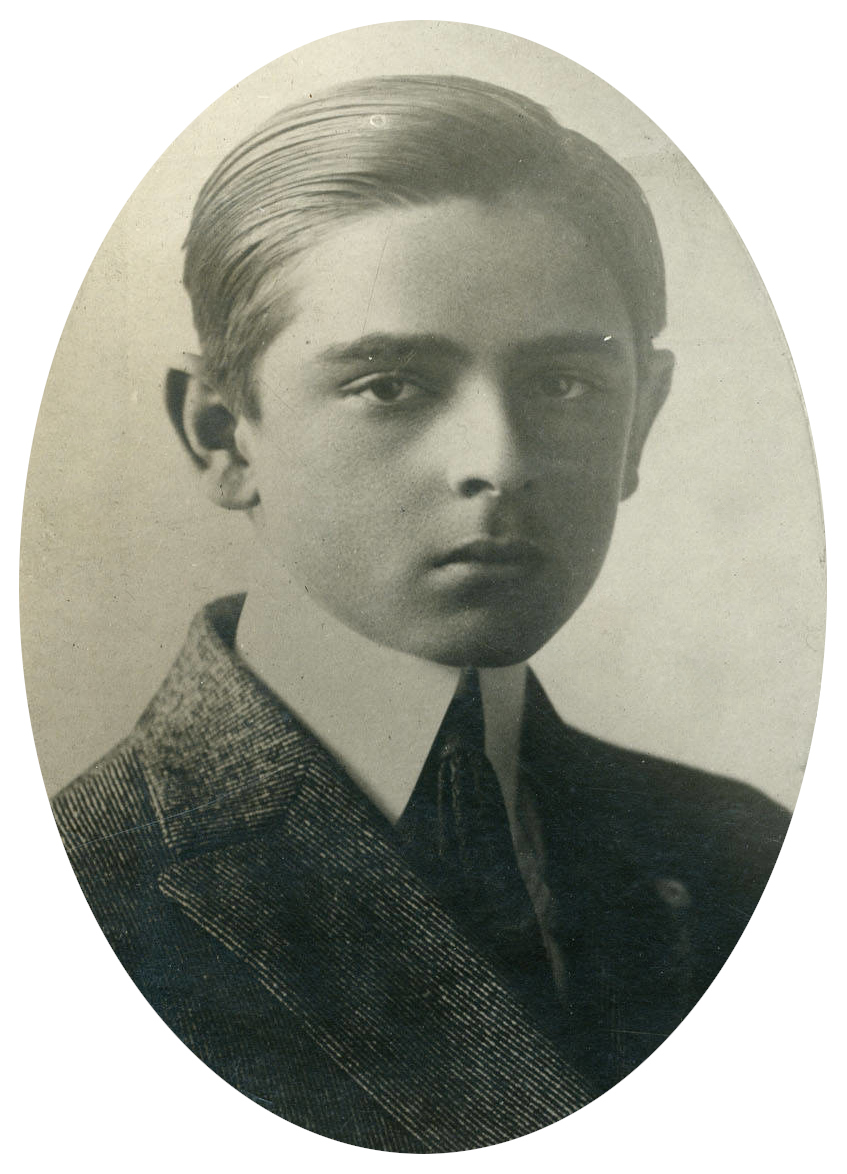
- Foy in his childhood vaudeville days, c. 1914
- Born: December 8, 1896; Chicago, Illinois, U.S.
- Died: April 20, 1977 (aged 80); Los Angeles, California, U.S.
- Burial place: Calvary Cemetery, East Los Angeles
- Occupations: Film producer, film director
- Years active: 1923–1963
- Spouse: Vivian Edwards (m. 1926)
- Parent: Eddie Foy Sr.
- Relatives: Eddie Foy Jr., brother

Bryan Foy (December 8, 1896 – April 20, 1977) was an American film producer and director who began his career in the "Seven Little Foys" vaudeville act started by his father, Eddie Foy. He produced more than 200 films between 1924 and 1963. He also directed 41 films between 1923 and 1934. He headed the B picture unit at Warner Bros. Pictures where he was known as "the keeper of the B's".

== Biography ==
Chips of the Old Block (1928)

He was born in Chicago, Illinois, on December 8, 1896. He was the eldest son of the vaudeville star Eddie Foy and appeared with his father in the vaudeville act "Eddie Foy and The Seven Little Foys." The act broke up when Bryan Foy left to join the U.S. Army in World War I in 1918, after which his remaining siblings continued performing with their father under the title, "Eddie Foy and the Younger Foys", through 1923, when their father retired. Contrary to their stated retirement, the Foy family still worked together in entertainment as Brian Foy directed them in a 1928 Vitaphone Varieties short.

He was also a songwriter, and by 1916 had several published songs, including "My Honolulu Girl".

Foy led Warners B picture unit until 1942 when the studio ended their second features. He was recruited to 20th Century Fox where he produced the acclaimed war movie Guadalcanal Diary in 1943. Following the war Foy entered motion picture production with a series of short subjects for Universal Pictures including a series of The Shadow with Foy writing and directing several of the two reelers. He remained with Fox until 1947 where he produced for Eagle-Lion Films with one of his assistant producers being famed mobster Johnny Rosselli. He was rehired by Warner Bros in 1950. From 1954 Foy produced films for Columbia Pictures. He returned again to Warners in 1962 for his final two films.

He died in Los Angeles from a heart attack on April 20, 1977. He was buried in Calvary Cemetery, East Los Angeles.

== Selected filmography ==
- The Swell Head (1928)
- Lights of New York (1928)
- The Home Towners (1928)
- Queen of the Night Clubs (1929)
- The Royal Box (1929)
- Stout Hearts and Willing Hands (1931)
- That's Gratitude (1934)
- Together We Live (1935)
- The Unwelcome Stranger (1935)
- Swellhead (1935)
- Road Gang (1936)
- Love Is on the Air (1937)
- Marry the Girl (1937)
- Smart Blonde (1937) (Torchy Blaine film series}
- West of Shanghai (1937)
- The Invisible Menace (1938)
- Girls on Probation (1938)
- Nancy Drew... Detective (1938) (Nancy Drew film series)
- Comet Over Broadway (1938)
- Devil's Island (1939)
- Hell's Kitchen (1939)
- On Dress Parade (1939)
- South of Suez (1940)
- Law of the Tropics (1941)
- I Was Framed (1941)
- Wild Bill Hickok Rides (1942)
- The Loves of Edgar Allan Poe (1942)
- Little Tokyo, U.S.A. (1942)
- Berlin Correspondent (1942)
- The Undying Monster (1942)
- Chetniks! The Fighting Guerrillas (1943)
- Guadalcanal Diary (1943)
- Doll Face (1945)
- Adventures of Casanova (1948)
- Trapped (1949)
- The Great Jewel Robber (1950)
- Breakthrough (1950)
- I Was a Communist for the FBI (1951)
- The Miracle of Our Lady of Fatima (1952)
- House of Wax (1953)
- The Mad Magician (1954)
- Battle Stations (1956)
- House of Women (1962)
- PT-109 (1963)
