= Flicka =

2006 American family adventure drama film

- Theatrical release poster
- Directed by: Michael Mayer
- Screenplay by: Mark Rosenthal; Lawrence Konner
- Based on: My Friend Flicka by Mary O'Hara
- Produced by: Kevin Halloran; Gil Netter
- Starring: Alison Lohman; Tim McGraw; Maria Bello
- Cinematography: J. Michael Muro
- Edited by: Andrew Marcus
- Music by: Aaron Zigman
- Production companies: Fox 2000 Pictures; Zucker-Netter Productions
- Distributed by: 20th Century Fox
- Release date: October 20, 2006
- Running time: 95 minutes
- Country: United States
- Language: English
- Budget: $15 million
- Box office: $21.9 million

Flicka is a 2006 American family adventure drama film loosely based on the 1941 children's novel My Friend Flicka by Mary O'Hara. The film is directed by Michael Mayer and written by Mark Rosenthal and Lawrence Konner. The novel had previously been made into a film by 20th Century Fox in 1943, and served as the inspiration for My Friend Flicka, a 39-episode TV series in 1956–1957. In this version, set in the 21st century, the protagonist is a girl, played by Alison Lohman. The film also features Maria Bello, Ryan Kwanten and country singer Tim McGraw, who also served as executive producer of the soundtrack album. This USD15 million-budgeted film grossed $21 million in the United States theaters, and then it went on to become a surprise hit in DVD market in the United States; it made more than $48 million on DVD sales and more than $19 million on DVD/Home Video rental.

A sequel, Flicka 2, was released direct to DVD on May 4, 2010, and another sequel, Flicka: Country Pride, was released on May 1, 2012.

== Plot ==
Katherine "Katy" McLaughlin has dreams of running her father's Wyoming horse ranch, but her father, Rob, has other plans. He is grooming her older brother, Howard, to take over the ranch and sends Katy away to a private school where she feels like a misfit. Rob is having trouble understanding his daughter as she continually defies his authority to follow her own path.

When she comes home for the summer, Katy is met with her father's disapproval because she did not finish a writing assignment at school, but is welcomed by her mother, Nell, and Howard. Howard wants to attend college instead of running the ranch, but is afraid of what his father would think if he told him. While out riding, Katy finds a black wild mustang, and feels a connection with the horse. She sets off to tame "Flicka" (Swedish for little girl), despite her father's protests.

Flicka is captured during a roundup, and Rob asks Katy not to go near Flicka. Determined to prove she can run the ranch, Katy starts training Flicka at night. Flicka slowly warms to Katy and the two develop a close bond. However, Rob sells Flicka to the rodeo, leaving Katy depressed. Nell and Howard are angry at and upbraid Rob for making the decision without including them. Howard then stands up to his father and says that he does not want the ranch, but Rob doesn't want to take Flicka back. In turn, Howard and Nell refuse to help Rob with the ranch, which he is now considering selling, since Howard does not want it. Katy starts writing about Flicka so that she can escape her pain.

At the rodeo, Howard and Katy enter the competition that Flicka is being used in, hoping to get the horse back. Flicka runs from Katy until she calls her name. Rob tries to intervene, and Katy freezes at the sight of him. Howard boosts his sister onto Flicka, and the two escape. After the two escape, Katy suddenly becomes lost in the mountains, and allows Flicka to make her way towards the ranch. The family reconciles and searches for Katy as a fierce thunderstorm moves in. Katy and Flicka are attacked by a mountain lion. Flicka bolts, throwing Katy to the ground and the lion goes to attack her. Flicka protects Katy, but is badly wounded in the process. Katy binds Flicka's wounds and refuses to leave her in the storm, resulting in her developing a fever. Rob finds the two and brings a delirious Katy back to the house. As her fever spikes, Katy calls for Flicka as Nell tends to her. Rob thinks Flicka is mortally wounded and believes she should be put down. Overhearing the argument, a dazed Katy stumbles into the room and gives her father permission to "shoot us now".

Rob goes outside and starts to cry as he finally understands his daughter's feelings - her pain and what a prideful, angry and selfish person he's been to his family all of these years. A gunshot is heard and Katy bursts into tears, thinking Flicka is dead. The next morning, Nell finds Rob walking back to the house, supporting the injured Flicka. She runs outside to help and finds out that the gunshot was actually him shooting at the mountain lion. Both are stunned that Flicka is not dead, and decide not to put her down. Katy starts to feel sick and she begins to recover. As he watches over his daughter, Rob reads the story that Katy had been writing about Flicka, eventually typing the story and sending it to the school so that Katy can pass for the year. When Katy wakes from the fever, she and Rob reconcile and he takes her to see Flicka. Rob apologizes to Howard and gives his son his blessing and Howard prepares for college. As a family, they decide to not sell the ranch, making it both a working ranch and a refuge for wild mustangs.

== Cast ==
- Alison Lohman as Katherine "Katy" McLaughlin
- Tim McGraw as Robert "Rob" McLaughlin, Katy's father
- Maria Bello as Nell McLaughlin, Katy's mother
- Ryan Kwanten as Howard McLaughlin, Katy's older brother
- Dallas Roberts as Gus
- Nick Searcy as Norbert Rye
- Danny Pino as Jack
- Kaylee DeFer as Miranda Koop
- Jeffrey Nordling as Rick Koop
- Dey Young as Esther Koop
- Buck Taylor as Wagner

== Release ==
Flicka was theatrically released on October 20, 2006, by 20th Century Fox. It was released on DVD on February 6, 2007, by 20th Century Fox Home Entertainment.

== Reception ==
Flicka received mixed reviews from critics and fans of the original 1943 film and its novel. Review aggregator website Rotten Tomatoes gave the film an approval rating of 54% based on 78 reviews, with an average rating of 5.70/10. The site's consensus states: "The rebellious protagonist will rally girls and children, but adults may find Flicka saddled with thin characters, over-the-top dialogue, and a plot that wanders into the countryside and never comes back". On Metacritic, the film has a score of 57 out of 100, based on 21 critics, indicating "mixed or average" reviews. Audiences polled by CinemaScore gave the film an average grade of "A-" on an A+ to F scale.

This version of the My Friend Flicka film and book series had a mixed to negative reception, praising Tim McGraw and Maria Bello's performances but criticizing the film for its script, lacking classic, teen drama, plot in comparison, narration, unofficial characters (which aren't even authorized in the books and original films), mild profanity, horse-girl stereotype, changing Flicka's fur color appearance from chestnut to black and the removal of the 10-year-old boy and official protagonist Ken McLaughlin out of the story for an unofficial female lead character instead, unlike 20th Century Fox's original film franchise and its books.

Variety's Todd McCarthy praised the film as "wonderful", called it "the best horse-and-kid picture since The Black Stallion" and "a young adult drama that rings emotionally true, with nary a manufactured note struck" that is "sharply observed and acted". Similarly, Stephen Hunter in The Washington Post described it as "a well-made family drama pitched to young adults that's honest, tough and surprisingly engaging" while praising McGraw's, Bello's and Lohman's performances. In the Toronto Star, Daphne Gordon also praised Alison Lohman, claiming that she "makes the whole thing worth watching" but conceding that "there are some flaws in the script that make the drama seem overwrought and manipulative".

On the other hand, Andrea Gronvall was unimpressed by Lohman while writing for the Chicago Reader, calling her performance "alternately shrill and pouty" and deeming the film to be "another miscalculation" on the part of director Michael Mayer. Writing for The New York Times, Manohla Dargis also mocked Lohman's "pouty" performance and labeled the film as "entertainingly ridiculous" with "parts [that] never cohere dramatically". Toddy Burton of the Austin Chronicle was less down on Lohman, conceding that she "has a couple of emotionally true moments" but ultimately felt that "the thin plot and absence of genuine emotion result in a moviegoing experience that involves a lot of eye-rolling".

== Animal deaths ==
Two horses died during the production of this film. The first death occurred at Big Sky Ranch in Simi Valley, California, on April 11, 2005, during a running scene. According to the American Humane Association (AHA), the horse broke its leg after a misstep and suffered a very rare injury requiring the animal to be euthanized. The AHA's report concluded that the "death was accidental and could not have been predicted or prevented". The second horse died two weeks later on April 25, at the Hansen Dam Equestrian Center in San Fernando Valley. Reports from both the AHA and the Los Angeles Animal Services Department concluded that during the shooting of a scene involving four horses, one of them got loose from the cowboy who was holding its lead rope, and after having been running loose for some 20 seconds, the horse changed direction and tripped on the regulation length 13-foot lead rope and fell to the ground, breaking its neck and dying instantly. As the accident would not have happened if the horse had not come loose, the Los Angeles Animal Services Department concluded that the accident had been preventable. However, after an investigation, the AHA declared that the deaths were not the fault of the filmmakers.

== Sequels ==
A sequel to Flicka, Flicka 2 was released directly to DVD on May 4, 2010. The sequel bears an entirely new cast and character list and is not a direct follow-up to Flicka. Flicka 2 features Patrick Warburton, Tammin Sursok and Clint Black. The film was directed by Michael Damian. Another sequel, Flicka: Country Pride, was released on May 1, 2012. With Damian returning as director, it also features Clint Black, along with Kacey Rohl, Black's wife Lisa Hartman-Black, Max Lloyd-Jones, Siobhan Williams, Laura Solties and Alexander Calvert. When asked if the Flicka franchise could follow the Air Bud, Beethoven and Marley & Me franchises by having its animal star talk, Damian responded: "I don't think so. But you know, never say never, because you never know what will happen. Stranger things have happened. I'm open to everything".

== Soundtrack ==
Flicka

Soundtrack album by various artists
- Released: October 17, 2006
- Recorded: 2006
- Genre: Film Soundtrack
- Label: Varèse Sarabande
- Producer: Various artists

Singles from Flicka: Original Motion Picture Soundtrack
- 1. "My Little Girl" Released: August 7, 2006

A soundtrack album was released October 17, 2006.

Track listing
| No. | Title | Artist | Length |
|---|---|---|---|
| 1. | "4:35 A.M." | Gemma Hayes | 3:02 |
| 2. | "Alive" | Becki Ryan | 2:53 |
| 3. | "The Things We Don't" | Watertown | 3:22 |
| 4. | "Catch the Wind" | Donovan | 2:56 |
| 5. | "Wild Horses" | Natasha Bedingfield | 4:02 |
| 6. | "Weight of the World" | Chantal Kreviazuk | 3:34 |
| 7. | "The Fireman" | The Dancehall Doctors | 2:47 |
| 8. | "Where Did I Go Right" | The Warren Brothers | 3:03 |
| 9. | "Rodeo Road" | Holly Williams | 3:01 |
| 10. | "My Little Girl" | Tim McGraw | 3:39 |
| 11. | "All the Pretty Little Ponies" | Catherine Raney | 4:19 |
| 12. | "Don't You Know" | City Fritter |
| 13. | "Texas in 1880" | Radney Foster and Pat Green |
| 14. | "Go Johnny" | Ken Tamplin |

=== Chart performance ===
| Chart (2006) | Peak position |
|---|---|
| US Billboard 200 | 123 |
| US Billboard Top Country Albums | 27 |
| US Billboard Top Soundtracks | 6 |

== See also ==
- My Friend Flicka (TV series)
- My Friend Flicka (film)
- My Friend Flicka
- Flicka 2
- Flicka: Country Pride
- List of films about horses
