= The Good Fellows =

1943 film by Jo Graham

- Directed by: Jo Graham
- Screenplay by: Hugh Wedlock Jr. Howard Snyder
- Produced by: Walter MacEwen
- Starring: Cecil Kellaway; Helen Walker; Mabel Paige; James Brown; Patti Hale; Kathleen Lockhart
- Cinematography: Theodor Sparkuhl
- Edited by: Arthur P. Schmidt
- Music by: Leo Shuken
- Production company: Paramount Pictures
- Distributed by: Paramount Pictures
- Release date: August 11, 1943
- Running time: 70 minutes
- Country: United States
- Language: English

The Good Fellows is a 1943 American comedy film directed by Jo Graham and written by Hugh Wedlock Jr. and Howard Snyder. The film stars Cecil Kellaway, Helen Walker, Mabel Paige, James Brown, Patti Hale and Kathleen Lockhart. The film was released on August 11, 1943, by Paramount Pictures. It was a rare lead film role for Cecil Kellaway.

== Plot ==
Jim Hilton devotes too much time to his lodge membership and too little to his real-estate business. He lets daughter Ethel handle a potential purchase of the Draytons' riverfront property, whereupon she develops a romantic interest in the Draytons' son, Tom.

Jim inadvertently commits money he doesn't have to his lodge's hosting a convention. At dinner, he persuades Mr. Drayton to join the lodge and pay a $2,000 admittance fee, then uses the money for his own purposes. The family runs out of patience with Jim's ways, and only daughter Sprat's disappearance brings him to his senses, at least temporarily.

== Cast ==
- Cecil Kellaway as Jim Hilton
- Helen Walker as Ethel Hilton
- Mabel Paige as Miss Kent
- James Brown as Tom Drayton
- Patti Hale as Sprat
- Kathleen Lockhart as Mary Hilton
- Douglas Wood as John Drayton
- Norma Varden as Mrs. Drayton
- Olin Howland as Reynolds
- Tom Fadden as Harvey
- William B. Davidson as Blake
