= San Antonio Rose (film) =

1941 film by Charles Lamont

- Directed by: Charles Lamont
- Written by: Jack Lait Jr. Paul Gerard Smith; Howard Snyder; Hugh Wedlock Jr.
- Produced by: Ken Goldsmith
- Starring: Jane Frazee; Robert Paige; Eve Arden; Lon Chaney Jr.
- Cinematography: Stanley Cortez
- Edited by: Milton Carruth
- Music by: Charles Previn
- Color process: Black-and-white
- Production company: Universal Pictures
- Distributed by: Universal Pictures
- Release date: 20 June 1941
- Running time: 63 minutes
- Country: United States
- Language: English

San Antonio Rose is a 1941 American musical comedy film directed by Charles Lamont and starring Jane Frazee, Robert Paige and Eve Arden. Produced and distributed by Universal Pictures, the supporting cast features Lon Chaney Jr. and Shemp Howard and the film was also designed as a showcase for the then-popular vocal group The Merry Macs.

== Synopsis ==
The plot involves two rival groups of entertainers converging on an abandoned roadhouse with the intent to reopen it, unaware that a gangster is eyeing the property for his own scheme.

== Cast ==
- Jane Frazee as Hope Holloway
- Robert Paige as Con Conway
- Eve Arden as Gabby Trent
- Lon Chaney Jr. as Jigsaw Kennedy
- Shemp Howard as Benny the Bounce
- The Merry Macs as Themselves, The Merry Macs
  - Mary Lou Cook as Mona Mitchell (as Mary Lou Cook – The Merry Macs)
  - Joe McMichael as Harry (as Joe McMichael – The Merry Macs)
  - Ted McMichael as Ted (as Ted McMichael – The Merry Macs)
  - Judd McMichael as Phil (as Judd McMichael – The Merry Macs)
- Richard Lane as Charles J. Willoughby
- Elaine Condos as Elaine (Dancer)
- Louis Da Pron as Alex (Dancer)
- Charles Lang as Ralph
- Riley Hill as Jimmy (as Roy Harris)
- Peter Sullivan as Don
- Richard Davies as Eddie
- Luis Alberni as Nick Ferris

== Soundtrack ==
- "Mexican Jumping Bean"

Music by Gene de Paul
Lyrics by Don Raye
Sung by The Merry Macs

- "You're Everything Wonderful"

Written by Henry Russell
Sung by Jane Frazee and Eve Arden

- "Gee But It's Tough to Be a Glamour Girl"

Written by Henry Russell
Sung by Jane Frazee and Eve Arden

- "The Hut-Sut Song (A Swedish Rhapsody)"

(uncredited)
Written by Ted McMichael, Jack Owens and Leo Killion
Sung by The Merry Macs

- "You've Got What It Takes"

Music by Gene de Paul
Lyrics by Don Raye

- "Bugle Woogie Boy"

Written by Henry Russell

- "San Antonio Rose"

Written by Bob Wills

- "Hi, Neighbor"

(uncredited)
Written by Jack Owens
Sung by Jane Frazee

- "Once Upon a Summertime"

(uncredited)
Lyrics by Jack Brooks
Music by Norman Berens

- "The Old Oaken Bucket"

(uncredited)
Lyrics by Samuel Woodworth
Music by George Kiallmark

== Bibliography ==
- Fetrow, Alan G. Feature Films, 1940-1949: a United States Filmography. McFarland, 1994.
