= Herbert Heywood (actor) =

American actor (1881–1964)

- Born: February 1, 1881; Chicago, Illinois, United States
- Died: September 15, 1964 (aged 83); Van Nuys, California, United States
- Occupation: Actor
- Years active: 1915–1950

Herbert Heywood (February 1, 1881 – September 15, 1964) was an American film actor. He appeared in more than 120 films between 1915 and 1950.

== Selected filmography ==
- The Call of the Sea (1915) - The Doctor
- Marie Galante (1934) - Tour Guide (uncredited)
- Gentlemen Are Born (1934) - Elderly Man (uncredited)
- Music in the Air (1934) - Fire Captain (uncredited)
- Life Begins at 40 (1935) - Rural Character (uncredited)
- Black Fury (1935) - Charlie - the Bartender (uncredited)
- Eight Bells (1935) - Engineer (uncredited)
- Go Into Your Dance (1935) - Dick (uncredited)
- Ladies Crave Excitement (1935) - Constable (uncredited)
- The Irish in Us (1935) - Joe's Steak House Owner (uncredited)
- Tailspin Tommy in the Great Air Mystery (1935, Serial) - Manuel Casmetto
- A Feather in Her Hat (1935) - Fish Monger (uncredited)
- Moonlight on the Prairie (1935) - Pop Powell
- Escape from Devil's Island (1935) - Bouillon
- Man Hunt (1936) - Charlie (uncredited)
- It Had to Happen (1936) - Trainer (uncredited)
- The Story of Louis Pasteur (1936) - Boncourt (uncredited)
- Road Gang (1936) - Convict at Blackfoot (uncredited)
- King of the Pecos (1936) - Josh Billings
- Robin Hood of El Dorado (1936) - Hacendado Wanting to Fight (uncredited)
- The King Steps Out (1936) - Innkeeper (uncredited)
- Sins of Man (1936) - Stage Door Man (uncredited)
- The Arizona Raiders (1936) - First Sheriff at Hanging (uncredited)
- White Fang (1936) - Mac (uncredited)
- A Son Comes Home (1936) - Hawkins (uncredited)
- Valiant Is the Word for Carrie (1936) - Chairman of Council (uncredited)
- You Only Live Once (1937) - Brakeman in Diner (uncredited)
- I Promise to Pay (1937) - Watchman (uncredited)
- Mountain Justice (1937) - Jury Foreman at Jeff's Trial (uncredited)
- Criminals of the Air (1937) - Hot-Cake Joe (uncredited)
- Draegerman Courage (1937) - Steve
- The Go Getter (1937) - Speedboat Operator (uncredited)
- San Quentin (1937) - Pop (uncredited)
- Slave Ship (1937) - Old Man
- Slim (1937) - Timekeeper (uncredited)
- White Bondage (1937) - Zack Walters (uncredited)
- Confession (1937) - Porter Carrying Letter (uncredited)
- Over the Goal (1937) - Jailkeeper (uncredited)
- Wells Fargo (1937) - Bartender (uncredited)
- Crime School (1938) - Boiler Room Supervisor (uncredited)
- Blockade (1938) - Bridge Sentry (uncredited)
- Three Blind Mice (1938) - Workman
- Racket Busters (1938) - Gas Station Owner (uncredited)
- Sing You Sinners (1938) - Al Burkee (uncredited)
- Swing, Sister, Swing (1938) - Mr. Beagle
- King of the Underworld (1939) - Clem (uncredited)
- The Oklahoma Kid (1939) - Deputy (uncredited)
- The Spirit of Culver (1939) - Watchman (uncredited)
- Let Us Live (1939) - Theatre Watchman (uncredited)
- The Return of the Cisco Kid (1939) - General Store Proprietor (uncredited)
- Young Mr. Lincoln (1939) - Tug-o'-War Contest Official (uncredited)
- Susannah of the Mounties (1939) - Hostler (uncredited)
- Konga, the Wild Stallion (1939) - Sheriff (uncredited)
- The Roaring Twenties (1939) - Pop (uncredited)
- Legion of the Lawless (1940) - Doctor Denton
- The Grapes of Wrath (1940) - Gas Station Attendant (uncredited)
- Little Old New York (1940) - Horace
- King of the Lumberjacks (1940) - Laramie, Train Engineer
- Brigham Young (1940) - Jokester at Chronicle Notice (uncredited)
- Young People (1940) - Farmer at Town Meeting (uncredited)
- No Time for Comedy (1940) - Joe (uncredited)
- Yesterday's Heroes (1940) - Conductor (uncredited)
- Spring Parade (1940) - Sepp - Wagon Driver (uncredited)
- A Dispatch from Reuter's (1940) - News Vendor in Paris (uncredited)
- The Strawberry Blonde (1941) - Toby
- The Lady from Cheyenne (1941) - Bit Role (uncredited)
- The Great American Broadcast (1941) - Doorman (uncredited)
- Out of the Fog (1941) - Morgue Attendant (uncredited)
- Sergeant York (1941) - Man at Church (uncredited)
- Bad Men of Missouri (1941) - Willard (uncredited)
- Manpower (1941) - Charlie - Watchman (uncredited)
- One Foot in Heaven (1941) - Shopkeeper (uncredited)
- Blues in the Night (1941) - Train Brakeman
- They Died with Their Boots On (1941) - Newsman (uncredited)
- Wild Bill Hickok Rides (1942) - Man at Citizen's Meeting (uncredited)
- Kings Row (1942) - Arnold Kelly (uncredited)
- Always in My Heart (1942) - Fisherman with Boat (uncredited)
- I Was Framed (1942) - Man on Park Bench (uncredited)
- In This Our Life (1942) - Worker (uncredited)
- Almost Married (1942) - Perkins
- Yankee Doodle Dandy (1942) - Colony Opera House Doorman (uncredited)
- The Big Shot (1942) - Gas Station Attendant (uncredited)
- Gentleman Jim (1942) - Man on Telephone (uncredited)
- Honeymoon Lodge (1943) - Conductor (uncredited)
- Fired Wife (1943) - Watchman (uncredited)
- Top Man (1943) - Mover (uncredited)
- Swingtime Johnny (1943) - Pop
- The Merry Monahans (1944) - Doorman (uncredited)
- None but the Lonely Heart (1944) - Dad Fitchitt (uncredited)
- The Mummy's Curse (1944) - Hill - Foreman (uncredited)
- Can't Help Singing (1944) - Mr. Brown (uncredited)
- Main Street After Dark (1945) - Hotel Clerk (uncredited)
- That's the Spirit (1945) - Doorman (uncredited)
- Along Came Jones (1945) - Townsman (uncredited)
- Her Highness and the Bellboy (1945) - Mr. Dwerger - Shop Owner (uncredited)
- This Love of Ours (1945) - Gardener (uncredited)
- Snafu (1945) - Fred (uncredited)
- Scarlet Street (1945) - Bellboy (uncredited)
- Idea Girl (1946) - Grumpy Man (uncredited)
- Smoky (1946) - Livery Stable Proprietor (uncredited)
- It's a Wonderful Life (1946) - Building & Loan Depositor (uncredited)
- The Egg and I (1947) - Mailman (uncredited)
- The Vigilantes Return (1947) - Farmer (uncredited)
- Brute Force (1947) - Chef (uncredited)
- They Won't Believe Me (1947) - Sheriff (uncredited)
- I Wonder Who's Kissing Her Now (1947) - Doorman (uncredited)
- This Time for Keeps (1947) - Riley (uncredited)
- The Wreck of the Hesperus (1948) - Alexander Tarn
- Panhandle (1948) - Neill (uncredited)
- Scudda Hoo! Scudda Hay! (1948) - Dugan (uncredited)
- All My Sons (1948) - McGraw (uncredited)
- Green Grass of Wyoming (1948) - Storekeeper Mort Johnson
- Feudin', Fussin' and A-Fightin' (1948) - Judge (uncredited)
- The Walls of Jericho (1948) - Tough (uncredited)
- Belle Starr's Daughter (1948) - Lounger (uncredited)
- Family Honeymoon (1948) - Station Agent (uncredited)
- That Wonderful Urge (1948) - Marriage License Clerk (uncredited)
- El Paso (1949) - Mahoney - the Lawyer (uncredited)
- The Beautiful Blonde from Bashful Bend (1949) - Waiter (uncredited)
- Take One False Step (1949) - Attendant (uncredited)
- Arctic Manhunt (1949) - Mailman (uncredited)
- Malaya (1949) - Bartender (uncredited)
- The Inspector General (1949) - Goatherd (uncredited)
- A Ticket to Tomahawk (1950) - Old-timer (uncredited)
- The Petty Girl (1950) - Royal Roof Doorman (uncredited)
- The Return of Jesse James (1950) - Frank James' Neighbor (uncredited)
