= Mylène Flicka =

Beninese blogger and activist

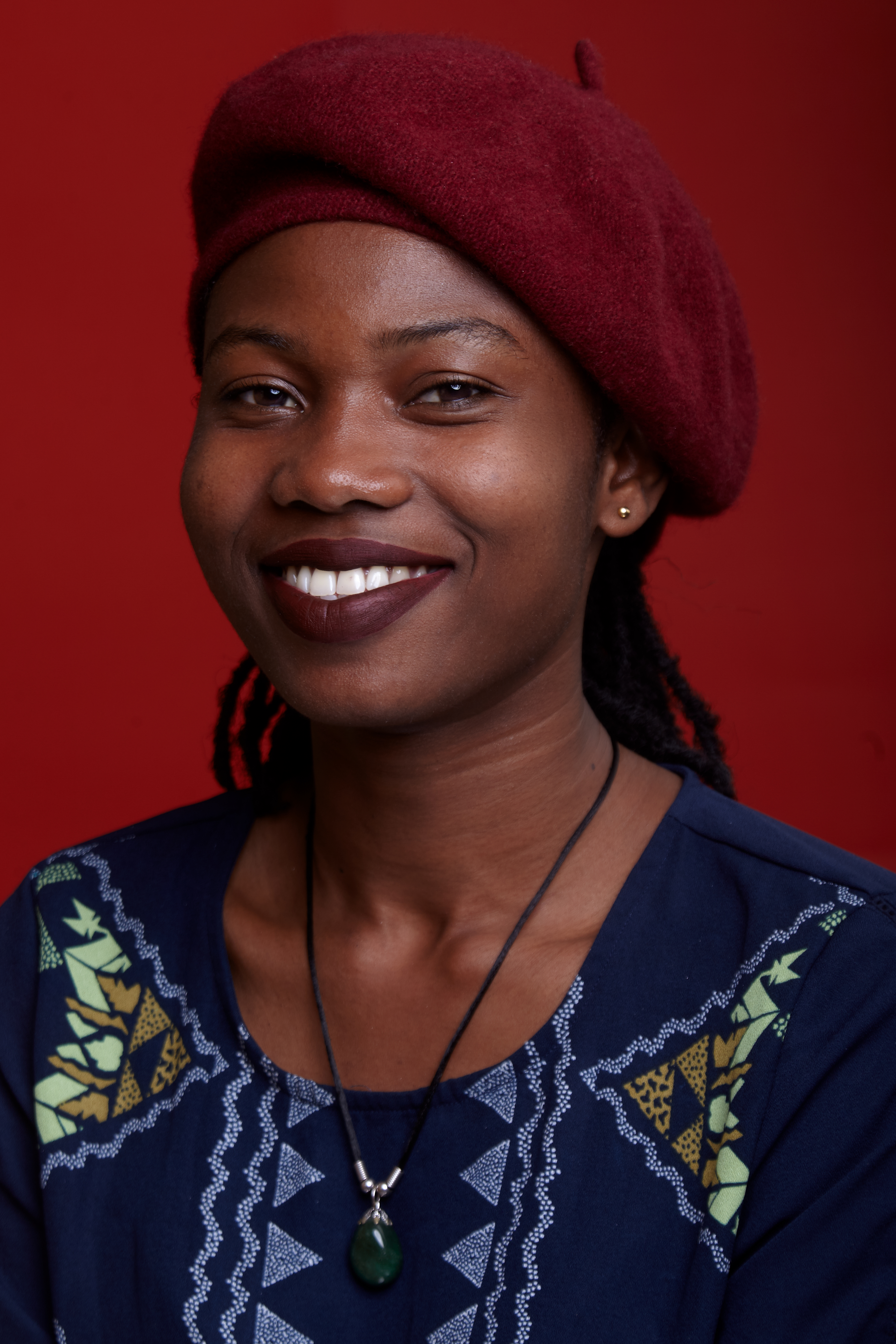
- Flicka in 2018
- Born: Marie-Madeleine Fifamè Akrota; 22 July 1996 (age 30)
- Occupations: Activist; Blogger; Digital Media
- Writing career
- Pen name: Mylène Flicka
- Language: French

Mylène Flicka (born Marie-Madeleine Fifamè Akrota; 22 July 1996) is a Beninese blogger, activist and social media entrepreneur.

== Biography ==
Marie-Madeleine Fifamè Akrota was born on 22 July 1996. She adopted the pseudonym Mylène Flicka when she was 14 years old, inspired by Mary O'Hara's novel My Friend Flicka. Aged 17, Flicka began her first blog, which was dedicated to highlight issues around women's rights in Benin. It was spurred into action by the declaration of a Beninese businessman that women had no use in the workplace. In 2011 she came first place in Benin's Literary Baccalaureate.

In 2015, using money from her student grant, she set up Irawo Media in order to showcase role models for young people from Benin and beyond. She also graduated in Benin with a Diploma from the National School of Administration and the Judiciary. In 2018 she began to study for an MBA in Paris.

Irawo focuses on profiling young people from francophone Africa in particular. One of the first people to be profiled by Flicka was Marie-Cécile Zinsou, many other notable African has followed since.

== Activism ==
Flicka has coordinated several online campaigns, including #GiveMeMyCredit in 2016 which campaigned for creatives, such as photographers, to be able to keep the rights to their work and to be credited when it is used. In the same year, Irawo exposed government corruption in water supply to the rural village of Bonouko. In 2017 she ran a campaign on social media called #FreeMyBoobs, which tried make it more acceptable for women to not wear a bra. In September 2017, Flicka gave her first TEDx talk.

In 2018 Flicka was part of the #TaxePasMesMo (translation: Don't Tax My Megabytes) campaign, where the government of Benin had tried to levy a social media tax on internet access, texts and calls. Flicka helped to organise and social media campaign, as well as peaceful protest around the cities. After ten days, the government withdrew the tax. Internet Without Borders gave their support to the campaign and Flicka works as an adviser to them. In October 2018 Flicka was sponsored by UNICEF to address the French National Assembly on World Girls Day.
