= The Gisele MacKenzie Show =

American musical variety television series (1957–1958)

- Written by: Hugh Wedlock Jr.; Howard Snyder; Billy Barnes; Bob Rogers
- Directed by: Joe Landis
- Starring: Gisele MacKenzie
- Music by: Axel Stordahl
- Composer: Bert Pearl
- Country of origin: United States

Production
- Producer: Charles Isaacs
- Production companies: J & M Productions

Original release
- Network: NBC
- Release: September 28, 1957 – March 29, 1958

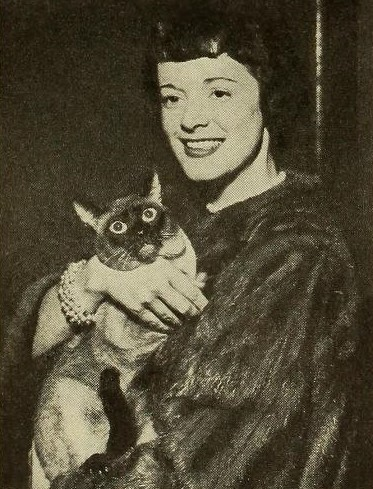
Gisele MacKenzie

The Gisele MacKenzie Show is an American musical variety television program that was broadcast on NBC from September 28, 1957, to March 29, 1958.

== Format ==
Star Gisele MacKenzie sang, played her violin, danced, and acted with guest stars each week. She was supported by The Joe Pryor Group (singers) and The Curfew Boys (dancers). Axel Stordahl's orchestra provided music. Jack Narz was the initial announcer; in January 1958, Tom Kennedy replaced him. Guest stars on the program included Eddie Fisher, Bob Crosby, Edie Adams, George Raft, Boris Karloff, Johnny Desmond, George Montgomery, Molly Bee, Margaret Truman, and Miyoshi Umeki.

== Production ==
J & M Productions, Jack Benny's company, produced the series, and Benny selected the writers and the director. It was broadcast live from KRCA-TV in Los Angeles from 9:30 to 10 p.m. Eastern Time on Saturdays. Scott Paper Company and Shick, Inc. sponsored it on alternate weeks. Charles Isaacs was the show's initial producer and head writer; Joe Landis was the director. Other writers were Hugh Wedlock, Howard Snyder, Billy Barnes, and Bob Rogers. Benny edited each script.

The show's competition, which an article in The New York Times called "formidable" included The Lawrence Welk Show on ABC and Have Gun – Will Travel on CBS. The Gisele MacKenzie Show was replaced by Turning Point.

=== Off-screen problems ===
Isaacs said in December 1957 that he was leaving the program. He cited a "mass of behind-the-scene kibitzing" and interference from the Scott company, J. Walter Thompson Company (Scott's advertising agency), and Music Corporation of America (the agency that represented artists on the show). He added that although the various interests were dissatisfied with the show, they offered no constructive suggestions for improvement. The sponsors said that Isaacs did not produce the show in a way that properly used MacKenzie's talents. Bob Henry replaced Isaacs, but The New York Times reported in February 1958 that off-screen problems persisted.

An article in the trade publication Billboard summarized Isaacs's resignation as "spotlighting a growing problem in the production of television programs." The article described the situation as "too many cooks all trying to stir the same pot". With two sponsors, a production company, a talent agency, and a network involved, "it was becoming impossible to tell who was calling the shots."

== Critical response ==
A review in the trade publication Variety described MacKenzie as "a personally impressive entertainer". Although technical problems marred part of the reviewed episode, the reviewer complimented the performances of MacKenzie and guest Eddie Fisher both individually and as a duo. A Variety review of another episode called MacKenzie "a slick performer, equally capable with gab or song."

A review of the premiere episode in The New York Times complimented MacKenzie's performance but criticized "the wretched nonsense that cluttered up at least parts of her show".

== Recognition ==
McKenzie's work on the show resulted in her being named Best New Star on Television by TV Radio Mirror magazine in 1958.
