= Thunderhead, Son of Flicka =

1945 film by Louis King

- DVD cover
- Directed by: Louis King
- Screenplay by: Dwight Cummins; Dorothy Yost
- Based on: Thunderhead; 1943 novel by Mary O'Hara
- Produced by: Robert Bassler
- Starring: Roddy McDowall; Preston Foster; Rita Johnson
- Cinematography: Charles G. Clarke
- Edited by: Nick DeMaggio
- Music by: Cyril J. Mockridge
- Color process: Technicolor
- Production company: 20th Century Fox
- Distributed by: 20th Century Fox
- Release date: March 15, 1945
- Running time: 78 minutes
- Country: United States
- Language: English
- Box office: $2,250,000

Thunderhead, Son of Flicka is a 1945 American Western film directed by Louis King and starring Roddy McDowall, Preston Foster, and Rita Johnson. It is a sequel to the 1943 film My Friend Flicka. The film was adapted to screen by Dwight Cummins and Dorothy Yost from Mary O'Hara's novel, Thunderhead (1943), second in a trilogy with My Friend Flicka (1941) and Green Grass of Wyoming (1946).

== Plot ==
Ken McLaughlin's mustang mare Flicka gives birth to an all-white colt that, unknown to Ken's dad, Rob, was actually sired by a neighboring rancher's thoroughbred racehorse, Appalachia, rather than Rob's own stallion, Banner. The colt, nicknamed "Goblin", proves to be difficult, but Ken trains him to race. Ken's mother, Nell, officially names the colt Thunderhead after the billowing white clouds she sees overhead. Thunderhead is entered into his first race with Ken as the jockey, but he suffers an injury, ending his racing career.

Meanwhile, the Albino, a wild mustang stallion that has been raiding local ranchers' herds for years, steals Rob's best mares and kills Banner, putting the family near bankruptcy. Although Banner was Flicka's sire, the Albino is Flicka's grandsire and Thunderhead's great-grand-sire. Rob, Ken, and the ranch hands search for the mares, but during the night, Thunderhead gets loose and runs off.

Tracking Thunderhead on foot to a secluded valley, Ken discovers the Albino's herd, including his father's horses. The Albino attacks Ken, but Thunderhead fights and kills the Albino, saving Ken's life.

Rob and the others arrive as Thunderhead rounds up the Albino's herd, heading them to the McLaughlin ranch. However, once there, Thunderhead is uneasy. Rob tells Ken that Thunderhead is a king now and wants to roam his realm. Ken removes Thunderhead's halter, freeing him.

== Cast ==
- Roddy McDowall as Ken McLaughlin
- Preston Foster as Rob McLaughlin
- Rita Johnson as Nelle McLaughlin
- James Bell as Gus
- Patti Hale as Hildy (as Diana Hale)
- Carleton Young as Maj. Harris
- Ralph Sanford as Charlie Sargent

== Filming and production ==
The film was shot on location at various sites, including the following:

- Oregon: Bridal Veil Falls at Oneonta Gorge and the Multnomah County Fairgrounds near Gresham, Oregon
- California: Brent's Crags, Hidden Valley, and Hollywood Park Racetrack
- Utah: Zion National Park, Kanab, Bryce Canyon National Park, Red Rock Canyon, Navajo Lake, Glendale Gorge, Cedar City, and Cedar Breaks National Monument
- Additional scenes were shot in Duck Creek, Nevada.

This was the first "Color by Technicolor" feature film to be photographed entirely on 35mm color film, in this case Technicolor (Monopack) motion picture film. Earlier Technicolor features used black and white negative film photographed behind color filters, or used Monopack only for certain sequences.

== Release ==
The film was released on DVD on February 22, 2005.

== See also ==
- List of films about horses
