= Patti Hale =

American retired actress and singer

- Born: Toledo, Ohio, U.S.
- Occupations: Actress, singer
- Years active: 1942–1954

Patti Hale is an American retired actress and singer currently living in Nevada.

Born in Toledo, Ohio, she began her show business career in local radio shows as well as theatre productions. She began working in films in 1942, getting a role in Always in My Heart. She was billed Patti Hale in the first few films of her career. During her film career, she appeared in motion pictures such as I Was Framed (1942) and My Friend Flicka (1943). She attended Ohio University, majoring in liberal arts. Aside from acting in films, she also did other work in the entertainment field, such as music acts, television series, and commercials. She later worked in PR.

== Filmography ==
| Year | Title | Role |
|---|---|---|
| 1942 | Always in My Heart | Booley |
| 1942 | I Was Framed | Penny Marshall |
| 1943 | My Friend Flicka | Hildy |
| 1943 | The Good Fellows | Sprat |
| 1945 | Thunderhead, Son of Flicka | Hildy |
