= Remount Ranch =

- U.S. National Register of Historic Places
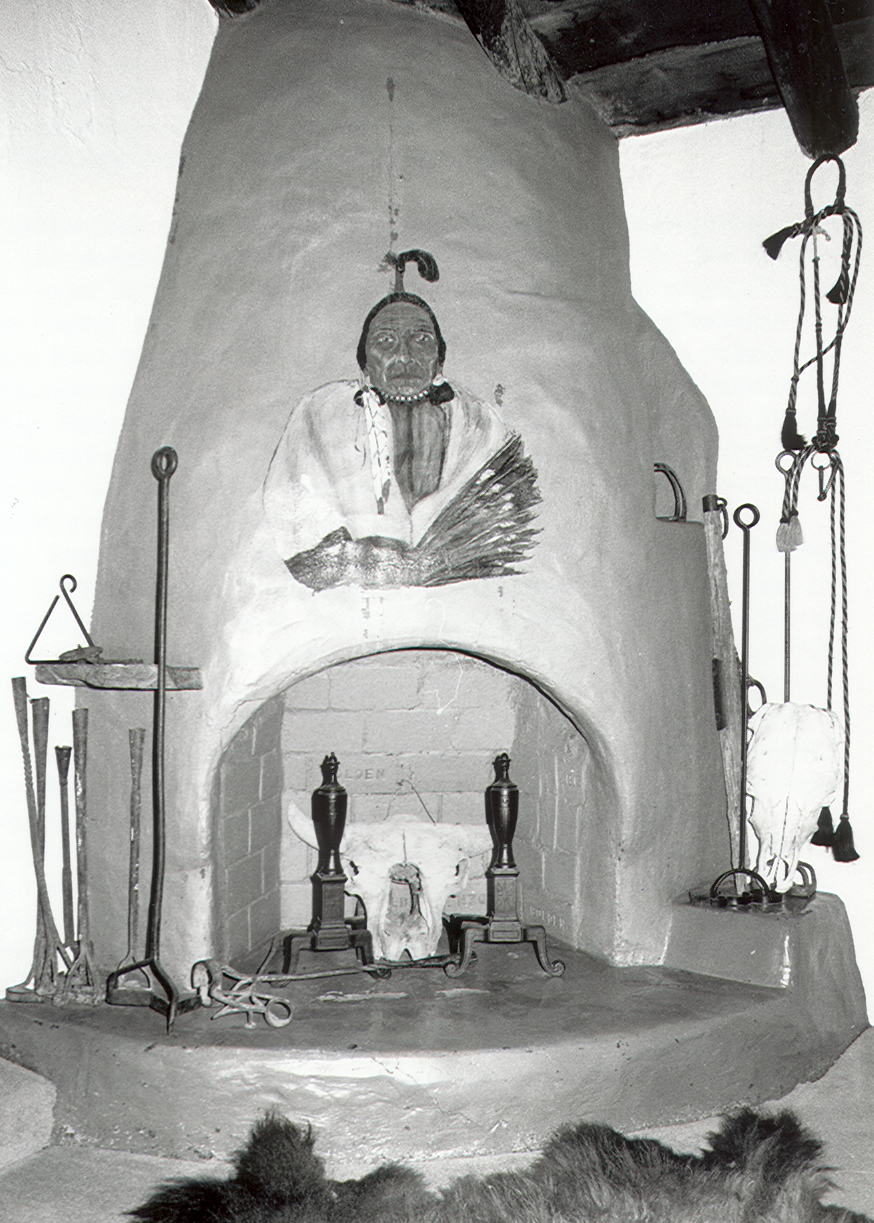
- Nearest city: Cheyenne, Wyoming
- Area: 25 acres (10 ha)
- Built: 1875, 1930
- Architectural style: Vernacular stone
- NRHP reference No.: 90001389
- Added to NRHP: September 19, 1990

Remount Ranch, in Laramie County, Wyoming near Cheyenne, Wyoming, is a pioneer cattle and horse ranch which dates from 1875. It was listed on the National Register of Historic Places in 1990. The listing included four contributing buildings and four contributing structures.

It was deemed significant "because it represents the themes of late 19th Century pioneer settlement and agricultural development, and was the home of the celebrated author, Mary O'Hara, who wrote extensively of the Wyoming landscape and ranch life. Among many books and short stories she wrote, she authored the classic book, My Friend Flicka.

The original ranch house property, called the Lone Tree Ranch, was purchased in 1886 by England-born Thomas Gunston, who increased the property by homesteading more land. An acquaintance of Gunston was outlaw Tom Horn, who "visited the Gunstons over the years and according to some sources, used the Gunston ranch to hide-out from the pursuit of Laramie County Sheriff Frank Roach and Federal agents seeking his arrest for the killing of a young boy named Willie Nichol. A beautifully braided horse hair bridle and reins was gifted Gunston by Tom Horn and still hangs in perfect condition on the wall of the bar at the Remount.

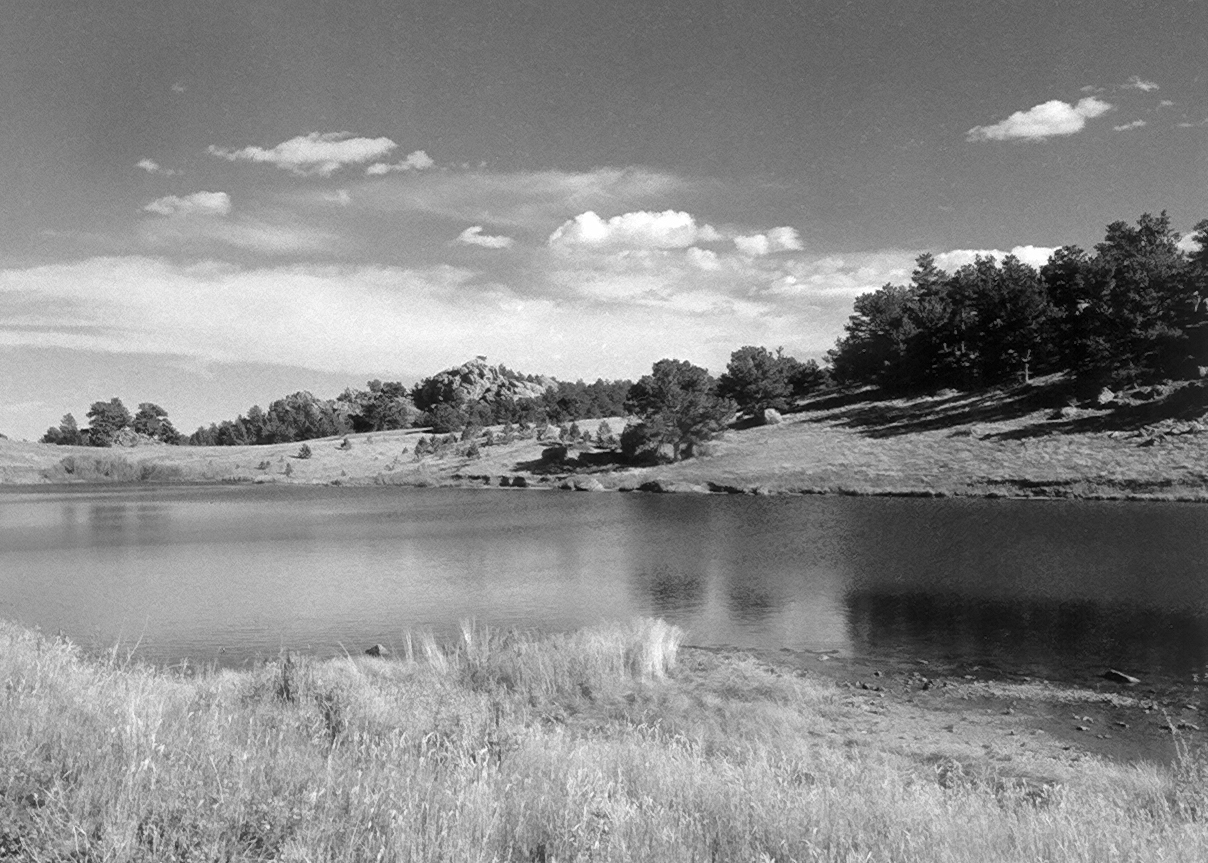
A rocky, pine-covered ridge runs through the center of the Remount Ranch. The ranch is located on the eastern slope of the Laramie Mountains at more than 7,500 in elevation.

It is located at the Remount Rd. exit off Interstate 80, about 26 miles (42 km) west of Cheyenne.

The ranch complex includes:

- a bunkhouse (1875), the original two-story building about 32.25 by 20.5 feet (9.83 m × 6.25 m) in plan
- a main house (1876), built of pink granite stone, with 6,000 square feet (560 m^{2}) and nine fireplaces, overlooking two acres of landscaped lawn
- a coal storage shed (1875), about 16 by 8 feet (4.9 m × 2.4 m) in plan, built of pink granite.

Also contributing is a "massive, pink granite wall [which] retains the gentle slope of the hill behind the main house. Built originally in 1886 and enlarged and expanded in 1930, this structure adds to the significance of the district and the overall beauty of the compound. It has granite stairs that ascend to the sloping, conifer covered meadow behind the main house, where a visitor can view the entire ranch and the rolling hills and high plains that typify the vast beauty of Wyoming."

The ranch includes 2 square miles (5.2 km^{2}) plus leased land; the listing is for 25 acres (10 ha).
