= I Was Framed =

1942 film by D. Ross Lederman

- Directed by: D. Ross Lederman
- Screenplay by: Robert E. Kent
- Based on: an idea by Jerome Odlum
- Produced by: Bryan Foy (uncredited)
- Starring: Michael Ames; Julie Bishop; Regis Toomey; Patty Hale
- Cinematography: Ted McCord, A.S.C.
- Edited by: Frank Magee
- Production company: Warner Bros. Pictures
- Distributed by: Warner Bros. Pictures
- Release date: April 4, 1942
- Running time: 61 minutes
- Country: United States
- Language: English
- Budget: $70,000
- Box office: $249,000

I Was Framed is a 1942 American crime film directed by D. Ross Lederman. According to Warner Bros records the film earned $159,000 domestically and $90,000 foreign.

== Plot ==
Investigative reporter Ken Marshall, who finds evidence implicating political boss Stuart Gaines, is framed for vehicular manslaughter despite the efforts of his editor Bob Leeds. He escapes from prison and, with the help of kindly doctor Phillip Black, starts a new life as a small town newspaperman with his wife Ruth and baby girl Penny. A few years later, Ken's prison cellmate Clubby Blake is released, blackmails Ken and then shoots him. The police arrive and shoot Blake. Ken recovers and is cleared when the corruptors who framed him confess.

== Cast ==
- Michael Ames as Ken Marshall
- Julie Bishop as Ruth Marshall
- Regis Toomey as Bob Leeds
- Patty Hale as Penny Marshall
- John Harmon as Clubby Blake
- Aldrich Bowker as Dr. Phillip Black
- Roland Drew as Gordon Locke
- Oscar O'Shea as Cal Beamish
- Wade Boteler as Ben Belden
- Howard Hickman as Stuart Gaines
- Norman Willis as Paul Brenner
- Hobart Bosworth as D. L. Wallace
- Guy Usher as Police Chief Taylor
- Sam McDaniel as Kit Carson

Uncredited (in order of appearance)
Sol Gorss	Mills, henchman assisting in framing Ken Marshall
Eddy Chandler	policeman who arrests Ken Marshall at fatal auto accident
Edward Hearn	policeman who assists at Ken Marshall's auto accident
Lee Powell	policeman who assists at Ken Marshall's auto accident
Harry Strang	policeman who assists at Ken Marshall's auto accident
Fred Kelsey	one of two drunken man at accident scene
Hank Mann	one of two drunken man at accident scene
Herbert Heywood	man on park bench near accident scene
Bert Moorhouse	district attorney prosecuting Ken Marshall
John Hamilton	judge imposing sentence on Ken Marshall
Jack Mower	prison guard overseeing Ken Marshall
Frank Mayo	prison guard overseeing Ken Marshall
Joan Winfield	nurse assisting Dr. Black
