= Internet Without Borders =

French non-profit organization

- Internet Sans Frontières
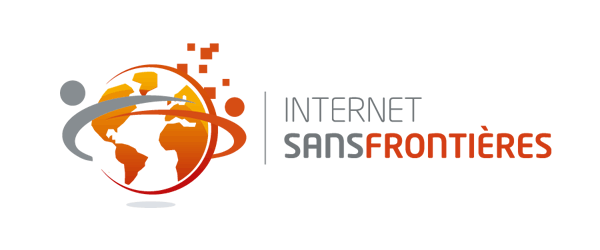
- Formation: 2008
- Founded: 2007
- Headquarters: France
- Executive Director: Julie Owono
- Website: internetwithoutborders.org

Internet Without Borders (French: Internet Sans Frontières), is a French non-profit organization founded in 2007 and registered in 2008. It objective is to promotes and defend digital rights, Internet freedom, access to information around the world and the protection of human rights online.

Internet Without Borders is also an international network of non-governmental organizations represent in countries like Chad, Togo, Senegal France, Brazil, and the United States. The organization advocates for an open and accessible internet and campaigns against censorship, internet shutdowns, and restrictions on digital freedoms.

The Executive Director of Internet Without Borders is Julie Owono. The association mission is to become a non-governmental organization (NGO) and a political organization which will act on the ground to help guarantee the free flow of information and offer oppressed peoples the opportunity to bear witness.
