= Marie-Cécile Zinsou =

French-Beninese art historian (born 1982)

- Born: 1982 (age 43–44); Paris, France
- Education: L'Ecole Alsacienne; American University of Paris
- Occupation: Art historian
- Parent: Lionel Zinsou (father)
- Relatives: Émile Derlin Zinsou (great-uncle)

Marie-Cécile Zinsou (born 1982) is a French-Beninese art historian and entrepreneur. She is president of the Fondation Zinsou, founded in 2005 in Cotonou, Republic of Benin, which promotes contemporary art in Africa and leads cultural, educational and social initiatives. In 2014, she opened the first museum of contemporary art in Benin.

== Early life and education ==
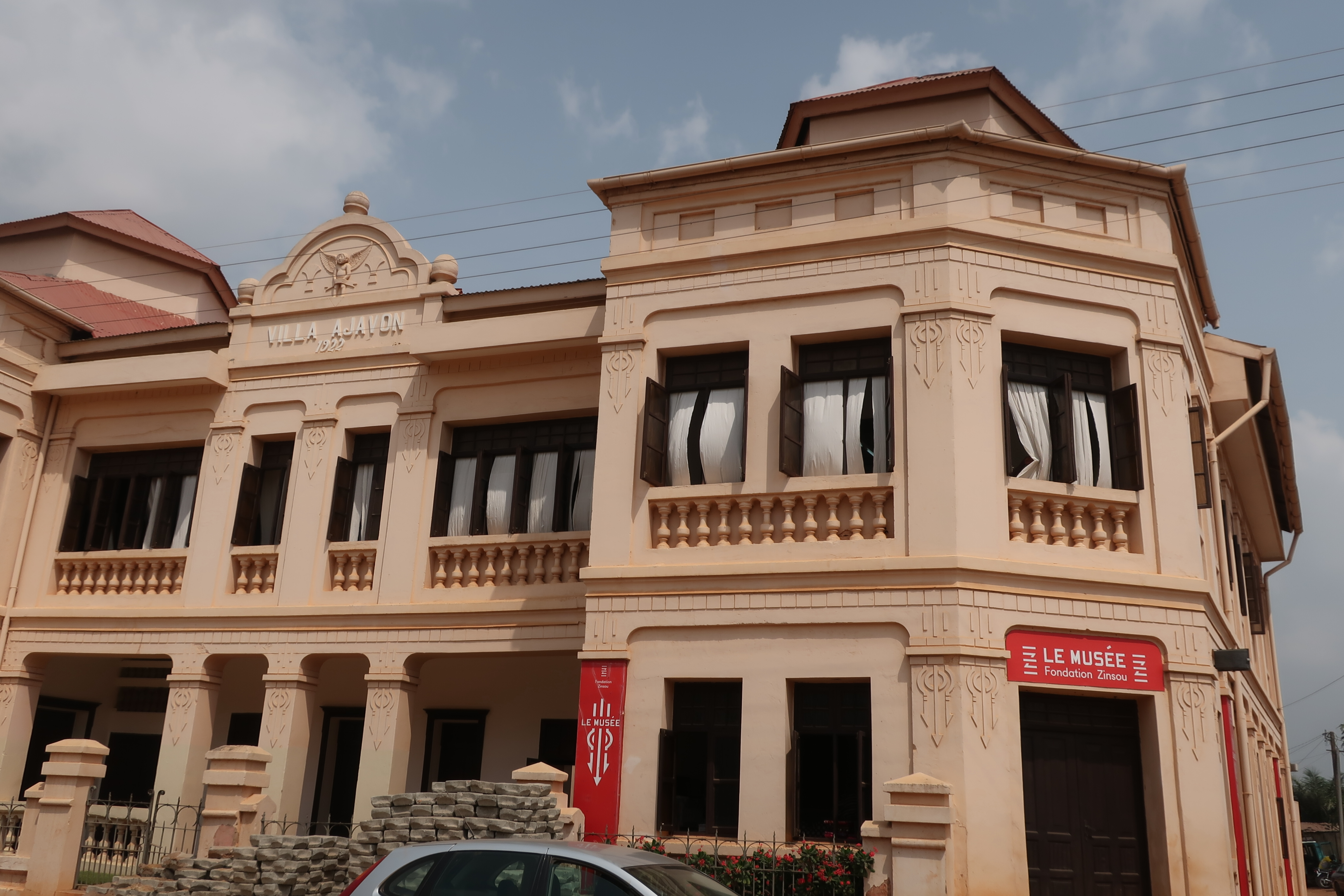
Zinsou Art Center in Ouida

Marie-Cécile Zinsou was born in Paris, in 1982 and grew up in France and England. She comes from a family of Beninese politicians and intellectuals and has dual French and Beninese nationality. Her father is Lionel Zinsou, an economist, who after years working in France returned to Benin, where he became Prime Minister from June 2015 to April 2016, being beaten in the second round as presidential candidate in the 2016 election. She is also the grand-niece of Émile Derlin Zinsou, former president of Dahomey (now Benin), and of the prominent Beninese cardinal Bernardin Gantin.

Zinsou studied partly at L'Ecole Alsacienne in Paris, and did further studies in the history of art at the American University of Paris.

== Career ==
In 2003, Zinsou worked at SOS Children's Villages in Abomey-Calavi, Benin, an Austrian non-governmental organization. In 2005, she launched CSEB, a business services company in Benin, and in June that same year with funding from her family was involved with setting up and running the Fondation Zinsou, based in Cotonou, as an art centre with on-site or travelling exhibitions, publishing books, and also providing libraries and training.

In 2013, Zinsou opened the Museum of Contemporary Art in Ouidah, the first museum of contemporary art in Benin. She has said: "The Fondation Zinsou was created to make a space for dialogue between artists and the public. I was working with children and I wanted them to find out about their culture and try to give them an idea of the time we’re living in. Of course, art is the best way to do that. In the end, we thought we couldn’t just focus on contemporary art and so have been working on heritage projects and the heritage building that hosts the museum." She was one of the first people to be featured on IRAWO, a social media platform created by Beninese entrepreneur Mylène Flicka to inspire the next generation of West African young people.

== Other activities ==
In 2020, Zinsou was a member of the jury that selected Kapwani Kiwanga as winner of the Marcel Duchamp Prize. In October 2021, she was appointed president of the board of directors of the Villa Medici in Rome.

== Awards ==
In 2014, the Fondation Zinsou was awarded a young artists grant from the Japan Art Association's Praemium Imperiale. Also in 2014, she was made a Chevalier de l'ordre des Arts et des Lettres.
