= Siobhan Williams =

British actress

- Born: Cambridge, England
- Occupation: Actress
- Years active: 2010–present

Siobhan Williams is a British actress.

== Career ==
Williams's first role was as recurring character Jamie Lewis on Heartland. In 20th Century Fox's Flicka: Country Pride, for which she was nominated for a Young Artist Award (Best Performance by a Young Actress 2013). She was also nominated for her performance in Nasser Group's Christmas Miracle (Best Supporting Actress). Williams also played the recurring character Ginger on the Cartoon Network's live-action series Level up, which was picked up in Canada by Teletoon. Williams guest-starred in the second episode of CTV's new procedural drama Motive, which aired as the series premiere on American Network ABC after it was picked up in summer 2013. Williams played Tiffany Greenwood, a high school student brutally murdered by a mayoral candidate/family friend she threatened to expose. This performance merited her yet another Young Artist Award nomination, and this time she won for Best Performance by a Guest Star. She also appeared in a supporting role in Lifetime's Forever 16, which was released in September 2013.

Williams guest starred in the Season 3 Premiere and Finale of AMC's Hell on Wheels. She played the daughter of a Mormon patriarch whose family is evicted from their homestead by railway officials and appeared in a highly controversial arc with series lead Anson Mount. She was due to return in season 4 as series regular but was unable to accept the contract due to scheduling conflicts with Black Box. In the summer of 2013 she filmed a western directed by Jon Cassar entitled Forsaken, alongside Kiefer Sutherland, Donald Sutherland, Demi Moore and Brian Cox. On August 8, 2014, it was announced that Williams was cast in the Lifetime dramedy series UnREAL.

== Filmography ==
=== Film ===
| Year | Title | Role | Notes |
|---|---|---|---|
| 2012 | Flicka: Country Pride | Stephanie | |
| 2012 | Christmas Miracle | Christy | |
| 2013 | Cheyenne | Cheyenne | Short film |
| 2015 | Nursing Sisters | Eden Pringle | Short film; part of Heritage Minutes |
| 2015 | Forsaken | Emily Chadwick | |
| 2016 | A Miracle on Christmas Lake | Karen Bell | |
| 2017 | Adventures in Public School | Anastasia | |
| 2017 | Garage Sale Mysteries: Murder Most Medievil | Emma | |
| 2017 | My Little Pony: The Movie | Additional Voices | |
| 2018 | Welcome to Marwen | Elsa | |
| 2019 | Italy | Dylan | Short film |
| 2020 | Bright Hill Road | Marcy | |
| 2026 | Harmonia † | Shine | Post-production |
| 2026 | Guarding Stars † | Ella Mae | |

=== Television ===
| Year | Title | Role | Notes |
|---|---|---|---|
| 2010 | Heartland | Jamie Lewis | Recurring, 6 episodes |
| 2012 | Level Up | Ginger | Recurring, 5 episodes |
| 2012 | Radio Rebel | Carnation Girl | Television movie |
| 2013 | Motive | Tiffany | Episode: "Crimes of Passion" |
| 2013 | Hell on Wheels | Naomi Hatch | Recurring, 2 episodes |
| 2013 | Forever 16 | Alexis | Television movie |
| 2014 | Black Box | Esme Black | 13 episodes |
| 2015 | UnREAL | Lizzie | 7 episodes |
| 2015 | Reign | Lady Amelie | Episode: "Tasting Revenge" |
| 2016 | Wynonna Earp | Steph | Episode: "Walking After Midnight" |
| 2017 | Sea Change | Ginny | Television movie |
| 2017 | Hit the Road | Carissa Bowden | 2 episodes |
| 2017–2018 | Beyblade Burst | Kristina Kuroda | 40 episodes; Voice |
| 2018 | Van Helsing | Siobhan | Episode: "I Awake" |
| 2018 | Secret Millionaire | Allison Johnson | Television movie |
| 2019 | Valley of the Boom | Jenn | 2 episodes |
| 2019 | Masters of Doom | Stevie Case | Unsold TV Pilot |
| 2019 | Deadly Class | Brandy | Recurring, 6 episodes |
| 2020 | Sacred Lies | Jo | Recurring, 10 episodes (season 2) |
| 2022 | Billy the Kid | Irene | 2 episodes |
| 2024 | Sight Unseen | Phoebe | 1 episode |
| 2024 | Tracker | Irene Hertzyl | 1 episode |
| 2025 | The Hunting Party | Sarah Dulles | 5 episodes |
| TBA | Murder by the Book | Lori | Main cast |
| 2027 | Mayfair Witches | Recurring | Post-production |

=== Video-games ===
| Year | Title | Role | Notes |
|---|---|---|---|
| 2018 | Dragalia Lost | Cleo, Johanna | |
| 2022 | The Quarry | Laura Kearney | Voice, motion-capture, and likeness |
| 2022 | The Chant | Jess | |

== Awards and nominations ==
Siobhan Williams awards and nominations
Awards and nominations
| Award | Wins | Nominations |
Totals
| Young Artist Awards | 1 | 3 |
| Wins | 1 |
| Nominations | 5 |

| Year | Nominated work | Award | Category | Result | Ref |
|---|---|---|---|---|---|
| 2013 | Christmas Miracle | Young Artist Awards | Best Performance in a TV Movie, Miniseries, Special or Pilot - Supporting Young Actress | Nominated | |
| 2013 | Flicka: Country Pride | Young Artist Awards | Best Performance in a DVD Film - Young Actress | Nominated | |
| 2014 | Motive | Young Artist Awards | Best Performance in a TV Series - Guest Starring Young Actress 17–21 | Won | |
| 2018 | Adventures in Public School | Leo Awards | Best Supporting Performance by a Female in a Motion Picture | Nominated | |
| 2019 | Van Helsing | Leo Awards | Best Guest Performance by a Female in a Dramatic Series | Nominated | |
| 2023 | The Quarry | British Academy Games Award | Performer in a Leading Role | Nominated | |
