= My Friend Flicka =

1941 novel by Mary O'Hara

- First edition cover
- Author: Mary O'Hara
- Language: English
- Publisher: J. B. Lippincott Company
- Publication date: 1941
- Publication place: United States
- Media type: Print (hardback)
- Followed by: Thunderhead

My Friend Flicka is a 1941 novel by Mary O'Hara, about Ken McLaughlin, the son of a Wyoming rancher, and his mustang horse Flicka. It was the first in a trilogy, followed by Thunderhead (1943) and Green Grass of Wyoming (1946). The popular 1943 film version featured young Roddy McDowall and was followed by two other film adaptations, Thunderhead, Son of Flicka (1945), and Green Grass of Wyoming (1948), both based on O'Hara's novels. A My Friend Flicka television series followed during 1956–1957, which first aired on CBS, then on NBC, with reruns on ABC and CBS between 1959 and 1966. The Disney Channel re-ran the program during the mid-1980s.

== Plot summary ==
Kenneth McLaughlin is a 10-year-old boy living on Goose Bar Ranch, just out of Cheyenne, Wyoming, with his practical father, Rob; his mother, Nell; and his older brother, Howard. Rob is often unsatisfied with Ken, who daydreams when he should be attending to practical matters; Nell, however, shares her son's sensitive nature and is more sympathetic. Howard, the older son, who looks and acts more like Rob, was allowed to choose and train a colt from among the Goose Bar herd (thoroughbreds that Rob McLaughlin is raising in the old-fashioned way, on the open range), much to the jealousy of Ken. Although Ken loves horses, Rob doesn't think his wool-gathering son deserves such a privilege yet.

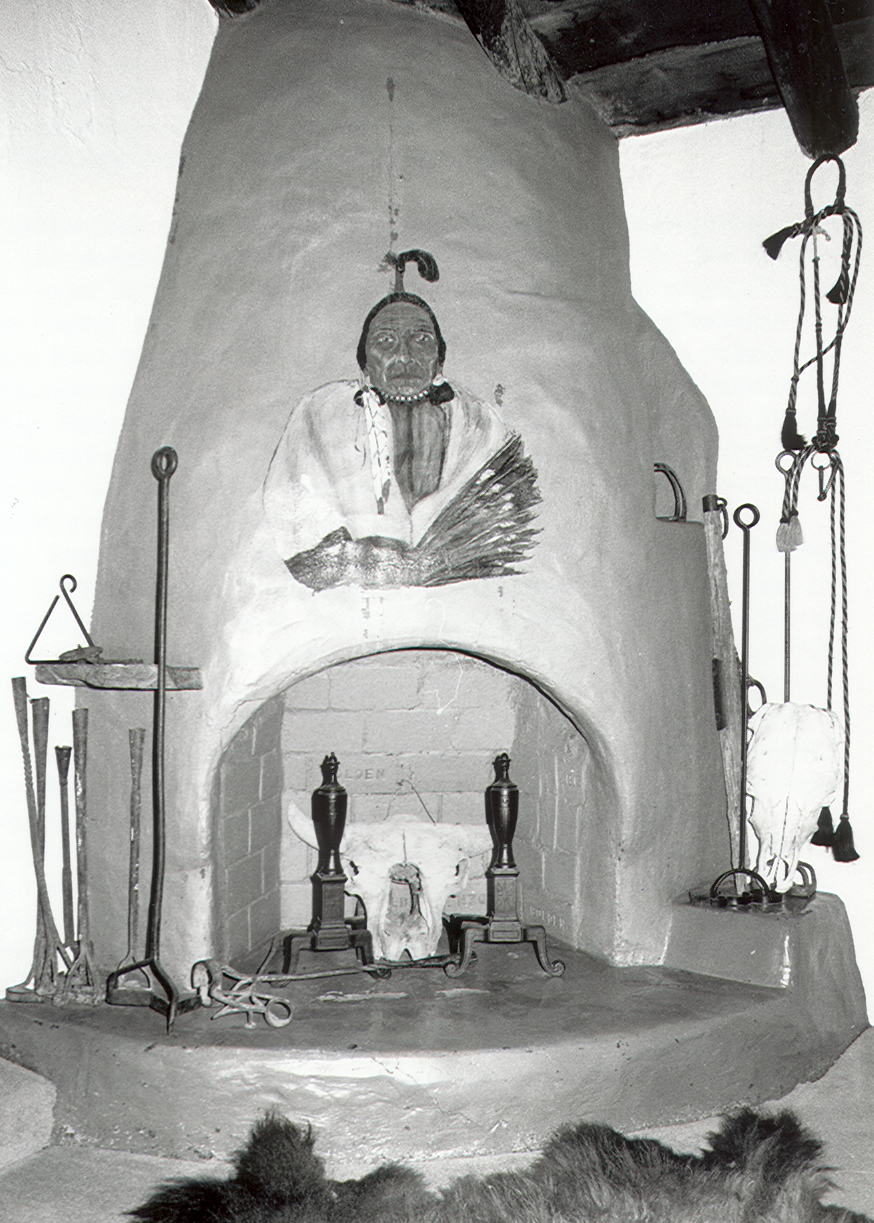
The room on the Remount Ranch outside Cheyenne, Wyoming where Mary O'Hara wrote My Friend Flicka. It was added to the main house by O'Hara and her husband around 1931.

At the beginning of the novel, Ken has angered his father by returning home from boarding school with failing grades and will have to repeat fifth grade, an expense Rob can ill afford. After a few mishaps in his first few days home, Nell convinces Rob to give Ken a colt, saying it will give him something to work towards and improve himself and his sense of responsibility. Ken is unable to decide which yearling he wants until he sees a beautiful sorrel filly running swiftly away from him.

Rob disapproves Ken's choice; this particular filly has a strain of mustang blood that makes her unpredictable. Her grandsire was a wild stallion called the Albino, named for his pure white coat. All the Goose Bar horses with this strain have been fast and beautiful, but untameable, and after many years of trying to break them, Rob has decided to get rid of them all. Ken persists and Rob reluctantly agrees to let him have the filly. Rob, Ken, and the ranch hands make two attempts to capture her. During the second attempt, she severely injures herself trying to jump a high barbed wire fence.

Ken spends the summer caring for the filly. He names her Flicka; Swedish for "little girl". Flicka comes to love and trust the boy, but her wounds fester and cause a dangerous blood infection, still young Ken perseveres in his care of her. During this time, he writes his overdue essay well enough to convince his fifth-grade English teacher to promote him to the next grade. However Flicka grows so thin and weak that Rob decides she must be shot to put her out of her misery. The night before the order is to be carried out, Flicka wades into a shallow brook, falls, and is unable to rise. Ken sneaks from the house and spends the night sitting on the bank of the stream, with his legs in the cold water, holding her head to prevent her from drowning. When he is found the next morning, he has developed chills then a high fever but Flicka is alive. As the days pass, Ken's fever turns to pneumonia, and his condition continues downhill. On the other hand, Flicka gains strength steadily. By the end of the book, Ken has not only regained sufficient health to return to school he learns that his beloved horse is alive.

== Film adaptations and franchise ==
=== Films ===
- My Friend Flicka (1943), a 20th Century Studios film directed by Harold D. Schuster and starring Roddy McDowall as Kenneth McLaughlin. It was followed by two sequels based on O'Hara's subsequent novels, Thunderhead, Son of Flicka (1945) and Green Grass of Wyoming (1948).
- Flicka (2006), a 20th Century Fox film directed by Michael Mayer that loosely adapts the story to modern times, starring a gender-flipped Alison Lohman as Katy McLaughlin.
  - Flicka 2 (2010), an original sequel released direct to DVD.
  - Flicka: Country Pride (2012), a 2nd original sequel released direct to DVD.

=== Radio ===
- My Friend Flicka (June 7, 1943), radio adaption presented on Lux Radio Theatre, starring Roddy McDowall and Rita Johnson reprising their 1943 film roles as Ken McLaughlin and Nell McLaughlin.

=== Television ===
- My Friend Flicka (1956-1957), 20th Century Fox television series on CBS.

== Influence ==
The novel was the inspiration for the pseudonym of Beninese social media entrepreneur Mylène Flicka.

== See also ==
- List of fictional horses

== Sources ==
- "Biography of Mary O'Hara". Georgetown University Libraries, Special Collections.
