= The Quarry (video game) =

2022 video game

- Developer: Supermassive Games
- Publisher: 2K
- Director: Will Byles
- Producers: Michael Burnham; Rick Blanco; Selen Ceri
- Designers: Nik Bowen; Dan Hooley
- Programmer: Michael Bailey
- Artist: Liam Grice
- Writers: Graham Reznick; Will Byles; Alex Farnham
- Composer: Ian Livingstone
- Engine: Unreal Engine 4
- Platforms: PlayStation 4; PlayStation 5; Windows; Xbox One; Xbox Series X/S; Xbox Cloud Gaming
- Release: 10 June 2022
- Genres: Survival horror, interactive drama
- Modes: Single-player, multiplayer

The Quarry is a 2022 interactive drama horror game developed by Supermassive Games and published by 2K. Players assume control of nine teenage counselors who must survive their last night at Hackett's Quarry summer camp amongst supernatural creatures and violent locals. Players make many choices throughout the game which may significantly affect character development, relationships, the story's plot, and its ending. All nine playable characters may survive or die, depending on the player's decisions.

Envisioned as the spiritual successor to Until Dawn (2015) and inspired by teen slasher and monster films such as Friday the 13th and The Thing, The Quarry features a large ensemble cast including Miles Robbins, Ariel Winter, Brenda Song, Skyler Gisondo, David Arquette, Halston Sage, Ted Raimi, Ethan Suplee, Lance Henriksen, Lin Shaye, Justice Smith, and Grace Zabriskie.

The Quarry was released for PlayStation 4, PlayStation 5, Xbox One, and Xbox Series X/S on 10 June 2022. The game received generally positive reviews from critics, who praised its narrative design, characters, cast performances, graphics, and its homages to classic horror films, though criticism was aimed at its gameplay, lack of interaction, abrupt endings, and camera system.

== Gameplay ==
Played from a third-person perspective, the player assumes control of nine different teenagers who must survive a night at the Hackett's Quarry. The player must regularly make different decisions, which can change the character development, the plot, and the relationships between characters. All nine playable characters can die in multiple ways by the end of the game. Although the game lasts about ten hours, early deaths of certain characters may shorten it.

The game is divided into ten chapters, along with a prologue and epilogue. In between each chapter, as is traditional with Supermassive Games' horror games, there are occasional intermissions with a narrator, this time being the fortune teller, Eliza (Grace Zabriskie), Eliza addresses the player directly and guides their future choices by reading tarot cards that the player has collected throughout the game.

Due to the game's branching storyline, it has 186 different endings, affected by player choices, performances in quick-time events, and vigilance in finding evidence and clues determine the game's conclusion, as well as the public's perception of the deaths that occurred at Hackett's Quarry. Once the player completes their first playthrough of the game, they will unlock Death Rewind, which allows them to undo three character deaths in each subsequent playthrough. Players can disable certain gameplay elements such as button mashing, quick-time events, and aiming and shooting, allowing them to progress in the game with minimum input.

The game features local and online multiplayer. In local multiplayer, players take turns to control different characters, while in the online mode, seven other participating players can vote in key decisions. Players can participate in voting by only downloading the demo version of The Quarry. The game also features a movie mode in which the player can set the personality traits of different characters and then let the story play out. Downloadable content was also included for purchase which allowed the player to use the "Death Rewind" option at the first playthrough, as well as an "80s throwback" mode which gives the characters alternate outfits which were popular in the 1980s.

== Plot ==
Laura Kearney (Siobhan Williams) and Max Brinly (Skyler Gisondo) drive at night to the Hackett's Quarry summer camp, where the two have been hired as counselors. The two nearly hit an unknown creature on the way, swerving off the road to avoid it. The local sheriff (Ted Raimi) finds them and orders that they stay the night at a nearby motel before going to the camp. Max and Laura disobey his orders. Upon arrival, they overhear a strange noise from the underground civil defense shelter. When the two investigate, Max is attacked by a creature, and the sheriff arrives and sedates Laura.

Two months later, seven camp counselors—Abigail Blyg (Ariel Winter), Dylan Lenivy (Miles Robbins), Emma Mountebank (Halston Sage), Jacob Custos (Zach Tinker), Kaitlyn Ka (Brenda Song), Nick Furcillo (Evan Evagora), and Ryan Erzahler (Justice Smith)—prepare to leave Hackett's Quarry as the summer ends. They become stranded after Jacob sabotages their vehicle, wanting to spend one more night with Emma, with whom he had a noncommittal relationship. The camp owner Chris Hackett (David Arquette) orders them to remain inside the lodge until he returns in the morning with help. Disregarding his request, the group throws a bonfire party and plays a game of Truth or Dare. Kaitlyn dares Emma to kiss Nick, who is Abigail's love interest, or Jacob. Emma chooses Nick, causing Abigail and Jacob to flee into the forest.

Throughout the night, two hunters named Bobby (Ethan Suplee) and Jedediah (Lance Henriksen) stalk the counselors. Nick finds Abigail in the woods, but a creature attacks them and bites Nick. Jacob hears Abigail's screams and runs into the woods to help her, while Emma swims to an island in the middle of the lake. There, she is attacked by another creature. Dylan, Kaitlyn, and Ryan rescue Nick, taking him to the poolhouse to recover. Dylan and Ryan then head for the camp's radio hut to signal for help. Nick's condition worsens, and he transforms into a werewolf.

Laura appears after the now-transformed Nick leaves the group, having recently killed one of the werewolves. She tells the remaining counselors in the poolhouse that the sheriff is Chris' brother, Travis, who imprisoned her and Max for two months. During this time, Max and Laura learned that one becomes a werewolf by being bitten. A curse causes the werewolf transformation, which happens every full moon. Chris and his children, Kaylee and Caleb, are among the several werewolves currently in the forest.

Laura informs the counselors that she wants to kill Chris so the curse can end. Ryan reluctantly agrees to help. The two head toward the Hackett residence, where the matriarch, Constance (Lin Shaye), berates Travis for failing to protect their family. It is revealed that Jedediah is the patriarch; Bobby, Chris, and Travis are their sons, and Kaylee is the werewolf Laura killed. Laura and Ryan learn more about the Hackett family's history within their home, and they eavesdrop on the conversation between Constance and Travis. The Hacketts capture them, and a fight ensues. During the commotion, a werewolf Chris attacks his family, as well as Laura and Ryan, who gets the opportunity to kill Chris.

Depending on who survived the altercation, Travis can reveal to Laura that the curse does not end with Chris' death. He explains that its progenitor was Silas Vorez: the cursed son of the fortune teller Eliza. Six years ago, the Hackett family visited her freak show, and Chris' children tried to free Silas by starting a fire as a distraction. The sideshow burned down, and Silas bit Caleb upon his freeing, who passed the curse onto Chris and Kaylee. Laura, Ryan, and Travis can drive towards the same spot where Laura and Max crashed two months ago to kill Silas and end the curse permanently.

== Development and release ==
The Quarry was developed by British developer Supermassive Games, and was envisioned as a spiritual successor to the studio's Until Dawn (2015). It is heavily inspired by teen slasher and monster films, and adheres to established horror movie tropes more firmly than The Dark Pictures Anthology, Supermassive's other horror franchise. Creative director Will Byles added that, while the game is set in modern times, "there's a very '80s feel" about the setting and the characters, citing movies including Sleepaway Camp and Friday the 13th as major sources of inspiration. The locals living near Hackett's Quarry have a more "retro" feel and the team was influenced by films such as The Hills Have Eyes, The Texas Chain Saw Massacre, and Deliverance. Supermassive was also inspired by Evil Dead and The Thing. The team wanted the game to feature horror movie tropes from different eras, and Byles went on to compare the game to a horror theme park. While the game pays homage to various horror films, the team used what they learned from making Until Dawn to build up players' fear in The Quarry, through creating tension rather than relying heavily on jump scares.

To capture the feelings of a classic horror films, Supermassive recruited a large cast of actors and several genre mainstays to portray the characters in the game, and collaborated with Los Angeles-based production company Digital Domain on the game's motion capture technology. The game's ensemble cast includes David Arquette, Siobhan Williams, Lin Shaye, Lance Henriksen, Grace Zabriskie, Ted Raimi, Ariel Winter, Ethan Suplee, Miles Robbins, Halston Sage, Zach Tinker, Brenda Song, Skyler Gisondo, Evan Evagora, and Justice Smith. According to Byles, the team wrote more than 1,000 pages for the game's script, and the game has a total of 186 different endings.

While Until Dawn was designed to be a solo experience, the team found that players liked to play the game in small groups, and acknowledged that Until Dawn was a popular game for people to simply watch. Therefore, The Quarry introduced a Movie mode, and expanded the multiplayer options introduced in previous Supermassive games such as Hidden Agenda and The Dark Pictures Anthology in order to appeal to people who simply liked to watch the game. The accessibility options were also designed to cater to more casual gamers who may not be experienced in playing games. When compared to The Dark Pictures Anthology, The Quarry was designed for a broader audience and had a smaller focus on gameplay.

Publisher 2K and Supermassive officially unveiled the game on 18 March 2022. The game was initially planned to be a Stadia exclusive, but ultimately did not release on the platform due to Google cancelling its plans for first-party titles in February 2021. The game was released for PlayStation 4, PlayStation 5, Windows, Xbox One, and Xbox Series X and Series S on 10 June 2022. Players who purchased the Deluxe version of the game would unlock the "Gorefest" option in Movie mode, which features more brutal imagery than the normal Movie mode. They would also receive additional character outfits, instant access to the Death Rewind feature, and the Horror History Visual Filter Pack, which allows players to change the aesthetic of the game by choosing from three visual filters inspired by horror films in different eras and various styles of horror filmmaking.

== Reception ==
Reception

Aggregate score
Aggregator	Score
Metacritic	(PC) 79/100 (PS5) 74/100 (XSXS) 78/100

Review scores
Publication	Score
Destructoid	8.5/10
Game Informer	8.5/10
GameRevolution	8.5/10
GameSpot	9/10
GamesRadar+	3/5
Hardcore Gamer	3.5/5
HobbyConsolas	84/100
IGN	7/10
Jeuxvideo.com	17/20
PC Gamer (US)	70/100
Push Square	5/10
Shacknews	9/10
The Games Machine (Italy)	8.4/10
The Guardian	4/5
VG247	4/5
VideoGamer.com	4/10

The Quarry received "generally favorable" reviews from critics for the PC and Xbox Series X/S versions, while the PS5 version received "mixed or average" reviews, according to review aggregator website Metacritic.

Destructoid stated that The Quarry successfully replicated what made its predecessors unique and praised its ability to "fluctuate between tension, drama, and levity", while writing, "These games are at their best when they leverage classic horror while also infusing some modern touches, meta moments, and well-timed laughs..." Game Informer lamented the limited player agency but praised the quality of the "enthralling" choices and engaging narrative. GameRevolution thought highly of the title's character development, graphic quality, Movie Mode, and branching narrative design, but felt that the exploration mode was slow and that its camera was claustrophobic. GamesRadar+ thought that its slow beginning, frequent pacing issues, and excessively large cast of characters hindered the game, but that some engaging plot points, quality voicework, and good graphics somewhat alleviated these issues. GameSpot praised the game's snappy dialogue, ensemble cast, love for horror movies, and the "palpable sense of weight behind many choices", but criticized the "glacial" walking speed of the exploration and the narrative's pacing issues.

IGN favored the script, cast, and various narrative climaxes, but disliked the lack of player interactivity and the absence of quality-of-life features, concluding, "The Quarry is worth playing at least once, but when compared to Until Dawn, it's one step forward and one step back." PC Gamer felt that, while the title retained the strengths of the developer's previous games, it only showed marks of improvement through its production values, and stated, "The plot, performances and visual fidelity are worth turning up for, as are some of the shocks, but more than ever much of your involvement seems like protective padding sandwiched between the scripted thrills." Shacknews gave high praise to the dynamically branching storylines, unique characters, homages to classic horror, and solid scares, but took minor issue with the fixed camera creating some awkward moments and the inability to fast-forward on repeat playthroughts. The Guardian gave it four out of five stars, writing, "The Quarry's charming writing and cinematic presentation make it an engrossing horror caper – even if this is, paradoxically, a game that's often at its best when you're not actively playing it."

=== Sales ===
In the United Kingdom, The Quarry was the 4th best-selling retail video game in its week of release. 84% of the game's launch sales in the UK were of the PS4 and PS5 versions. In the United States, the game was the 19th best-selling video game of June 2022.

=== Accolades ===
Year	Award	Category	Result	Ref
2022	Golden Joystick Awards	Best Performer (Ted Raimi)	Nominated	
2022	The Game Awards	Innovation in Accessibility	Nominated	
2023	Visual Effects Society Awards	Outstanding Visual Effects in a Real-Time Project	Nominated	
2023	New York Game Awards	Great White Way Award for Best Acting in a Game (Justice Smith)	Nominated	
2023	New York Game Awards	Great White Way Award for Best Acting in a Game (Grace Zabriskie)	Nominated	
2023	GLAAD Media Awards	Outstanding Video Game	Nominated	
2023	British Academy Games Awards	Performer in a Leading Role (Siobhan Williams)	Nominated	
