= Flicka: Country Pride =

- Official DVD cover
- Directed by: Michael Damian
- Written by: Jennifer Robinson
- Based on: Characters by Mary O'Hara
- Produced by: Connie Dolphin
- Starring: Clint Black; Lisa Hartman Black; Kacey Rohl; Max Lloyd-Jones; Siobhan Williams; Laura Soltie; Alexander Calvert
- Cinematography: Ron Stannett
- Edited by: Seth Flaum
- Music by: Mark Thomas
- Distributed by: 20th Century Fox Home Entertainment
- Release date: May 1, 2012
- Running time: 93 minutes
- Country: United States
- Language: English

Flicka: Country Pride is a 2012 American drama film and a sequel to Flicka (2006) and Flicka 2 (2010). Directed by Michael Damian, it stars Clint Black, Lisa Hartman Black, Kacey Rohl and Siobhan Williams.

== Plot ==
Toby (Clint Black) comes to Cherry Creek Farms to serve as stable manager for a family in financial and emotional stress. Kelly Jenkins (Kacey Rohl) is a teenage horse lover who lives on the ranch with her mother, Lindy (Lisa Hartman). Her father died in an accident, and the stables have had increasing difficulty making a profit since.

Toby brings Flicka with him, and Kelly quickly befriends the beautiful horse. Kelly's former friend, Stephanie Meyers, boards her horse at the stables. Stephanie felt slighted by Kelly after her father died. She develops a growing dislike of Kelly and increasingly treats her like some lower class servant. When Stephanie's dressage teammate is injured, Flicka helps Kelly win a spot on the team, much to Stephanie's chagrin. The jealousy grows even worse when Briggs McBride, the team's male member, shows more interest in Kelly than Stephanie. The hatred grows to the point that Stephanie challenges Kelly to a race in which the loser would leave for good. Out of annoyance to Stephanie's constant bad treatment, Kelly accepts. The two females battle each other on the field until Stephanie falls off of her horse and Kelly is declared the winner. Enraged, Stephanie leaves the team and her friends follow. Kelly becomes so horrified that she sunk the team that would have saved the stable that she rides off into the night. However, Toby pursues her and convinces her to come back, as her mother is more worried about her than the stable. Encouraged by Briggs, Kelly puts together a team of unconvincing, yet talented teens to compete in the national horse competition. Kelly and her team take on Stephanie's team. The competition lasts quite a while until Kelly pulls of the best performance in the end. Stephanie is impressed and notices that Kelly sees the same talent in people as her dad did. The two rivals become friends again and near the final, Stephanie is declared the winner and Kelly is given the second place. Because Kelly won runner up in the competition, she now has enough money to save the stable and keep her mom and Toby together. Kelly gets her happy ending.

== Cast ==
- Clint Black as Toby
- Lisa Hartman Black as Lindy Jenkins
- Kacey Rohl as Kelly Jenkins
- Siobhan Williams as Stephanie Meyers
- Lily Pearl Black as Nina Meyers
- Teryl Rothery as Paige
- Max Lloyd-Jones as Briggs McBride
- Emily Bett Rickards as Mary
- Rusty Humphries as Announcer
- Laura Soltis as Mrs. Meyers
- Katherine King as Amber
- Kelsey McNabb as Receina
- Landon Blackstock as Billy The Groom
- Peter-John Prinsloo as James
- Alexander Calvert as Jesse
- Rustin Gresiuk as Alex
- Holly Kay as Singer
- Dave Leader as Digger

== Production ==
Filming took place in Kelowna, British Columbia.

== Release ==
The film premiered at the Newport Beach Film Festival in May 2012, and was released on Blu-ray and DVD in May of the same year.

== Soundtrack ==
- "Are You Listening" - written by Brad Swanson and Jeff Gold, performed by Christina Gonzales Sikola
- "Man of the Law" - performed by Buck McCoy
- "Open Road"
- "Dancing 4 My Life" - performed by Ida LaFontaine
- "Dance Like You're Invisible" - written and performed by Holly Kay
- "With You" - written and performed by Holly Kay
- "I'm so over you" - performed by Joe Liaye
- "Give your heart wings" - written and performed by Holly Kay
- "Rebel Angel" - written and performed by Jayson Bendera
- "Let go" - written and performed by Holly Kay

== See also ==
- List of films about horses
