= Nick Carter, Master Detective (film) =

1940 film by Jacques Tourneur

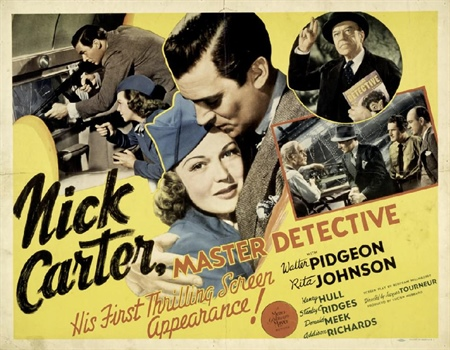
- Lobby card
- Directed by: Jacques Tourneur
- Written by: Bertram Millhauser
- Based on: original story by Bertram Millhauser and Harold Buckley
- Produced by: Lucien Hubbard
- Starring: Walter Pidgeon; Rita Johnson
- Cinematography: Charles Lawton Jr.
- Edited by: Elmo Veron
- Music by: Edward Ward
- Production company: Metro-Goldwyn-Mayer
- Distributed by: Loew's Inc.
- Release date: December 13, 1939 (New York)
- Running time: 59 minutes
- Country: United States
- Language: English
- Budget: $379,000
- Box office: $456,000

Nick Carter, Master Detective is a 1939 film directed by Jacques Tourneur and starring Walter Pidgeon. It is based original stories created for the screen featuring the Nick Carter character from the long-running literary series.

Pidgeon and Donald Meek went on to reprise their roles in two sequels, Phantom Raiders (1940) and Sky Murder (1941). (Note: After appearing on Broadway, Walter Pidgeon returned to Hollywood but was relegated to secondary roles in films such as Saratoga and The Girl of the Golden West. Taking a leading role in Nick Carter, Master Detective was an opportunity to build his profile with MGM.)

== Plot ==
Detective Nick Carter boards an airliner with John Keller, the inventor of a revolutionary new aircraft at the Radex Aviation Company. The pilot makes an unscheduled landing so that his confederates can try to steal Keller's plans, but Carter holds them off, and stewardess Lou Farnsby manages to fly them to safety. Carter poses as Robert Chalmers, the new assistant to Hiram Streeter, the boss of the California factory, and has Lou reassigned to the infirmary.

During his investigation, Carter receives the unwanted help of his companion Bartholomew, who fancies himself an amateur sleuth.

A test flight of the new aircraft ends in disaster; the wings are ripped off during a high-speed dive, and the test pilot is killed. It is found that bolts attaching the wings had been cut. Later, Carter finds Keller's body in a running car in a closed garage. Carter suspects that Keller was strangled with the scene staged to resemble that of a suicide.

Carter notices that each time a part of the blueprints goes missing, a worker has a serious accident and is sent home by company doctor Dr. Frankton. He surmises that sections of the plans have been photographed, with photos hidden under bandages. He goes to apprehend Frankton. Unable to leave the factory in time, he has the unsuspecting Lou escort a "patient" home. When Carter arrives, Frankton tells him that Lou will be killed unless the doctor shows up at a prearranged rendezvous soon.

Carter lets him leave, but secretly has the roof of Frankton's car painted with a white cross. This enables Carter to track the doctor in an aircraft to a section of the Los Angeles docks. Frankton races to a waiting ship with Lou and his associates. Carter engages in a firefight with the crew using a Tommy gun borrowed from the police.

Although his aircraft is shot down, Carter prevents Frankton's getaway. A harbor patrol gunboat arrives and the villains are forced to surrender.

== Cast ==
- Walter Pidgeon as Nick Carter / Robert Chalmers
- Rita Johnson as Lou Farnsby
- Henry Hull as John A. Keller
- Stanley Ridges as Dr. Frankton
- Donald Meek as Bartholomew
- Addison Richards as Hiram Streeter
- Henry Victor as J. Lester Hammil
- Milburn Stone as Dave Krebe
- Martin Kosleck as Otto King
- Frank Faylen as Pete
- Sterling Holloway as Bee-Catcher
- Wally Maher as Cliff Parsons
- Edgar Dearing as Denny
- William Newell as Cabbie
- Eddy Chandler as Workman
- Harry Tyler as Locker Guard

== Production ==
The aircraft shown in the film is a Ryan ST c/n NC17344. Most of the aerial footage was staged in the studio backlots and incorporated into background scenes.

== Reception ==
According to MGM records, Nick Carter, Master Detective earned $276,000 in the U.S. and Canada and $180,000 elsewhere, resulting in a loss to the studio of $93,000.

In The New York Times, reviewer Frank S. Nugent wrote: "No, this isn't Nick Carter as we remember him, but it's an amusing fiction for all that, with enough action to compensate for the arch unoriginality of the plot and with pleasantly casual performances all around. ... They [Pidgeon and Meek] make a gay crime-solving combination".

In a modern-day review in Time Out, Tom Milne wrote: "Tourneur's second film in Hollywood, it's briskly and competently done, but the best thing about it is Donald Meek's performance as Bartholomew, the Bee Man, a mousy little apiculturist who fancies himself as a private eye".
