= Legion of the Lawless =

1940 film

- Directed by: David Howard
- Screenplay by: Doris Schroeder
- Story by: Berne Giler
- Produced by: Bert Gilroy
- Starring: George O'Brien; Virginia Vale; Herbert Heywood
- Cinematography: Harry Wild
- Edited by: Frederic Knudtson
- Music by: Paul Sawtell
- Production company: RKO Radio Pictures
- Release date: January 5, 1940
- Running time: 59 minutes
- Country: United States
- Language: English

Legion of the Lawless is a 1940 American Western film directed by David Howard and starring George O'Brien, Virginia Vale, and Slim Whitaker. The screenplay was written by Doris Schroeder from a story by Berne Giler. The plotline is similar to another screenplay developed by Schroeder for the 1942 film, Pirates of the Prairie.

== Plot ==
In the Old West, lawyer Jeff Toland arrives in Ivestown to establish his practice upon learning the railroad will pass through the town. He discovers Ivestown is geographically and economically divided from East Ivestown. Jeff meets Les Harper, Dr. Denton, and Harper's niece, Ellen Ives. Harper and his brother-in-law, Henry Ives (Ellen's father), tell Toland their "vigilante committee" enforces justice and neither he nor his law practice is welcome. Toland refuses to leave town. His office is ransacked and a threatening note is left. Henry Ives has a change of heart and believes electing a sheriff and setting up a proper government is necessary, since the railroad will result in town growth.

Meanwhile, Harper wants to buy up all the land on Main Street in anticipation of the railroad coming. However, Toland learns the railroad is coming through East Ivestown after a railroad surveying report concludes the land there is better suited. A drunk Dr. Denton leaks the report to Harper. Toland blames himself for the leak. Harper and his henchmen head to East Ivestown to intimidate landowners into deeding their property to him for prices well below market value. Toland interrupts Harper as he attempts to strong arm East Ivestown store owner, Lafe Barton. In the skirmish, Lafe's son is wounded by gunfire. Toland is unaware Harper was the assailant.

Toland tells Henry Ives about the re-routing of the railroad and the attack in East Ivestown. Ives tells Harper he will call a meeting to disband the vigilante committee. Ives is ambushed and murdered en route to the meeting. Toland discovers his body in the road. At the meeting, Harper says East Ivestown rightfully belongs to Ivestown and they must re-take it in light of the railroad coming through there. After Toland reports Henry Ives' death, Harper implicates Toland. Dr. Denton is shot and wounded as he rides to warn Toland about the vigilantes coming for him, and their plans to take over East Ivestown. Denton admits to Toland he leaked the survey report.

Toland rides to East Ivestown ahead of the vigilantes to warn the town. The townspeople agree to separate from Ivestown and hurriedly appoint Toland as sheriff. Harper and his gang appear under the ruse of arresting Toland for Ives' murder. Toland, however, arrests Harper after proving Harper was there, earlier, when he attacked Lafe Barton. Harper's gang start a fire as a distraction so they can free Harper. Toland pursues Harper back to Ivestown and a gunfight ensues at the saloon. Harper feigns surrender and shoots Toland. Toland returns fire killing Harper. The East Ivestown men arrive as the fight ends. Later, Toland, recovering from his wound, receives a letter of appreciation from the governor. He and Ellen are now romantically involved, leading Dr. Denton to ponder becoming a lawyer, too.

== Cast ==
- George O'Brien as Jeff Toland
- Virginia Vale as Ellen Ives
- Herbert Heywood as Dr. Denton
- Norman Willis as Les Harper
- Hugh Sothern as Henry Ives
- William Benedict as Eddie
- Eddy Waller as Lafe Barton
- Delmar Watson as Lafe Barton Jr.
- Bud Osborne as Holmes
- Monte Montague as Borden
- Slim Whitaker as Henchman Ben
- Mary Field as Mrs. Barton
