= Appointment for Love =

1941 film by William A. Seiter

- Original film poster
- Directed by: William A. Seiter
- Written by: Ladislaus Bus-Fekete (story Heartbreak); Felix Jackson; Bruce Manning
- Produced by: Bruce Manning; Frank Shaw (associate producer)
- Starring: Charles Boyer; Margaret Sullavan; Rita Johnson
- Cinematography: Joseph A. Valentine
- Edited by: Ted J. Kent
- Music by: Frank Skinner
- Production company: Universal Pictures
- Distributed by: Universal Pictures
- Release date: October 31, 1941
- Running time: 89 minutes
- Country: United States
- Language: English

Appointment for Love is a 1941 American romantic comedy film directed by William A. Seiter and starring Charles Boyer, Margaret Sullavan and Rita Johnson. It was made and distributed by Universal Pictures. It was nominated for the Academy Award for Best Sound, Recording for the work of Bernard B. Brown.

== Plot ==
Playwright Andre Cassil meets physician Doctor Jane Alexander after she falls asleep during his play after working a long shift at the hospital. Romance quickly blossoms and they quickly get married. However, on their honeymoon they discover they have radically different views on marriage. The upshot is their relationship remains unconsummated and they continue to live separate lives in individual apartments in the same building.

== Cast ==
- Charles Boyer as Andre 'Pappy' Cassil
- Margaret Sullavan as Dr. Jane Alexander
- Rita Johnson as Nancy Benson
- Eugene Pallette as George Hastings
- Ruth Terry as Edith Meredith
- Reginald Denny as Michael Dailey
- Cecil Kellaway as O'Leary
- J.M. Kerrigan as Timothy
- Roman Bohnen as Dr. Gunther
- Gus Schilling as Gus
- Virginia Brissac as Nora
- Mary Gordon as Martha
- Erskine Sanford as Hastings' Butler (uncredited)
- Dale Van Sickel as Ambulance Driver (uncredited)

== Bibliography ==
- Rinella, Michael D. Margaret Sullavan: The Life and Career of a Reluctant Star. McFarland, 2019.
