= London by Night (film) =

1937 film by Wilhelm Thiele

- Directed by: Wilhelm Thiele
- Written by: George Oppenheimer
- Based on: The Umbrella (play) by William Matthew Scott
- Produced by: Sam Zimbalist
- Starring: George Murphy; Rita Johnson; Virginia Field
- Cinematography: Leonard Smith
- Edited by: George Boemler
- Music by: William Axt
- Production company: Metro-Goldwyn-Mayer
- Distributed by: Loew's Inc.
- Release date: July 30, 1937
- Running time: 69 minutes
- Country: United States
- Language: English
- Budget: $200,000
- Box office: $321,000

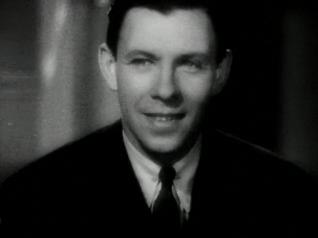
George Murphy in the film

London by Night is a 1937 American murder mystery film directed by Wilhelm Thiele and starring George Murphy, Rita Johnson and Virginia Field. It marked the screen debut of Johnson who while shooting the film also unsuccessfully tested to replace Jean Harlow in Saratoga. Gossip columnist Louella Parsons drew attention to her as a rising star. It was based on an unproduced play The Umbrella by British writer William Matthew Scott.

== Plot ==
A London-based newspaperman is about to head for Paris for his first vacation in three years when he becomes embroiled by the murder of a shopkeeper in the square where he lives, followed shortly afterwards by the shooting of a police constable.

Working alongside Inspector Jefferson of Scotland Yard he encounters a spirited socialite when he accosts her family's butler whom he wrongly suspects is the killer. Public alarm rises further when a barmaid at a nearby pub is also killed.

== Cast ==
- George Murphy as Michael Denis
- Rita Johnson as Patricia Herrick
- Virginia Field as Bessie
- Leo G. Carroll as Correy
- George Zucco as Inspector Jefferson
- Montagu Love as Sir Arthur Herrick
- Eddie Quillan as Bill
- Leonard Mudie as Squires
- J.M. Kerrigan as Tims
- Neil Fitzgerald as Inspector Sleet
- Harry Stubbs as Postman
- Ivan F. Simpson as Burroughs
- Frank Baker as Walker
- Leyland Hodgson as Maddow
- Robert Adair as Bobby
- Harry Allen as Glazer
- Colin Kenny as Scotland Yard Detective
- William Bailey as Scotland Yard Detective

== Critical reception ==
Variety gave a positive review and wrote, "A workmanlike script … the dialog of which is both intelligent and punchy, goes a good distance in making London by Night the meritorious melodrama it is" and with its suspense sustained in a "skilful manner." The reviewer was impressed by the performances, and wrote, "George Murphy acquits himself creditably as a romantic lead, while Rita Johnson digs herself deeply into audience favor in a role that calls for less work than allotted Murphy. Eddie Quillan’s drunk bit is excellent and his English accent worthy. Another whose work is more than ordinarily competent is George Zucco, who plays a Scotland Yard inspector."

The Film Daily also gave a positive review and said that it was a suspenseful thriller with generally good performances, but it stated that Rita Johnson was given a role that was "a little too much for an unexperienced [sic] player."

Modern Screen’s Leo Townsend was dissatisfied and wrote that the film "is a routine, and, for the most part, dull mystery drama due to the fact that its story contains nothing new. The script is so painstakingly unoriginal, for instance, that most audiences will have the finger on the real villain long before Reporter George Murphy reveals the culprit’s identity … and that sort of thing … makes a murder mystery weak." He was more positive in his opinion of the performances and noted that "newcomer, Rita Johnson shows real promise."

Photoplay made similar comments, and described the film as "another murder mystery with the usual formula" and predicted "most of the audience will guess the murderer before George Murphy, the reporter, does."

== Box office ==
According to MGM records the movie earned $187,000 in the US and Canada and $134,000 elsewhere, resulting in a loss of $3,000.

== Bibliography ==
- Wagner, Laura. Hollywood's Hard-Luck Ladies: 23 Actresses Who Suffered Early Deaths, Accidents, Missteps, Illnesses and Tragedies. McFarland, 2020.
