= My Friend Flicka (film) =

1943 film by Harold D. Schuster

- Directed by: Harold D. Schuster
- Screenplay by: Lillie Hayward; Francis Edward Faragoh (adaptation)
- Based on: My Friend Flicka; 1941 novel by Mary O'Hara
- Produced by: Ralph Dietrich
- Starring: Roddy McDowall; Preston Foster; Rita Johnson
- Cinematography: Dewey Wrigley
- Edited by: Robert Fritch
- Music by: Alfred Newman
- Color process: Technicolor
- Production company: 20th Century-Fox
- Distributed by: 20th Century-Fox
- Release date: May 26, 1943
- Running time: 89 minutes
- Country: United States
- Language: English
- Box office: $1.6 million (US rentals) or $2.4 million

My Friend Flicka is a 1943 American Western film about a young boy, played by Roddy McDowall, who is given a young horse to raise. It is based on Mary O'Hara's popular 1941 children's novel of the same name. Thunderhead, Son of Flicka, released on March 15, 1945, was the sequel to My Friend Flicka.

== Plot ==
Wyoming ranchers Rob and Nell McLaughlin somewhat reluctantly decide to give their 10-year-old son, Ken, a chance to raise a horse and learn about responsibility. Rob is disappointed in his son when he shows him his poor grades while he was at boarding school. He chooses a one-year-old chestnut mustang filly and names her Flicka, which ranch hand Gus informs him is a Swedish word for "girl".

Rising debts and a "loco" strain have created problems for the McLaughlins. They accept a $500 offer from a neighboring rancher for the young filly's mother, Rocket, who had been clocked running at 35 miles per hour (56 km/h), but the mare is accidentally killed while being transported.

The situation gets worse when Flicka is badly cut by barbed wire and the wound becomes infected. Ken cares for her best he can, but the infection leads father Rob to conclude that the horse must be put down. A gunshot by his father makes Ken fear the worst, but it turns out he was warding off a mountain lion after being warned by Flicka. The filly's life is spared, and young Ken nurtures her back to health.

== Cast ==
- Roddy McDowall as Ken McLaughlin
- Preston Foster as Rob McLaughlin
- Rita Johnson as Nell McLaughlin
- James Bell as Gus
- Diana Hale as Hildy
- Jeff Corey as Tim Murphy
- Arthur Loft as Charley Sargent (uncredited)

== Production ==
Parts of the film were shot in Duck Creek, Aspen Mirror Lake, Rockville Road, Strawberry Valley, Johnson Canyon, Zion National Park, and Cedar Breaks National Monument in Utah.

== Radio adaptation ==
A radio adaptation of My Friend Flicka was presented on Lux Radio Theatre June 7, 1943, starring McDowall and Johnson.

== Reception ==
In 1943 the New York newspaper PM was pleased: "Seldom has Hollywood treated any part of the American scene with more warmth and charm and faithfulness than in My Friend Flicka. The sweeping ranchlands of the West…are here presented not as background for the…movie Western, but as the homeland of a real, believable American family, glimpsed at a time of normal, credible crisis in the shaping of the character of an American boy….Roddy McDowell…is reliably winning and little Diana Hale…is a real darling".

The film aggregator Rotten Tomatoes gave the film 86%. The DVD, which came out during the early years of the 21st century, was warmly received by the critics. One such was DVD Verdict, which praised its "bright and vibrant" colors and its "superior transfer" from VHS to DVD. The film was also released in its original full frame and aspect ratio and contained three trailers: Bushwhacked, Far from Home: The Adventures of Yellow Dog, and Lucas along with a choice of English or Spanish audio and subtitles.

== See also ==
- List of films about horses
