= Julie Owono =

Cameroonian lawyer and Internet activist (born 1986)

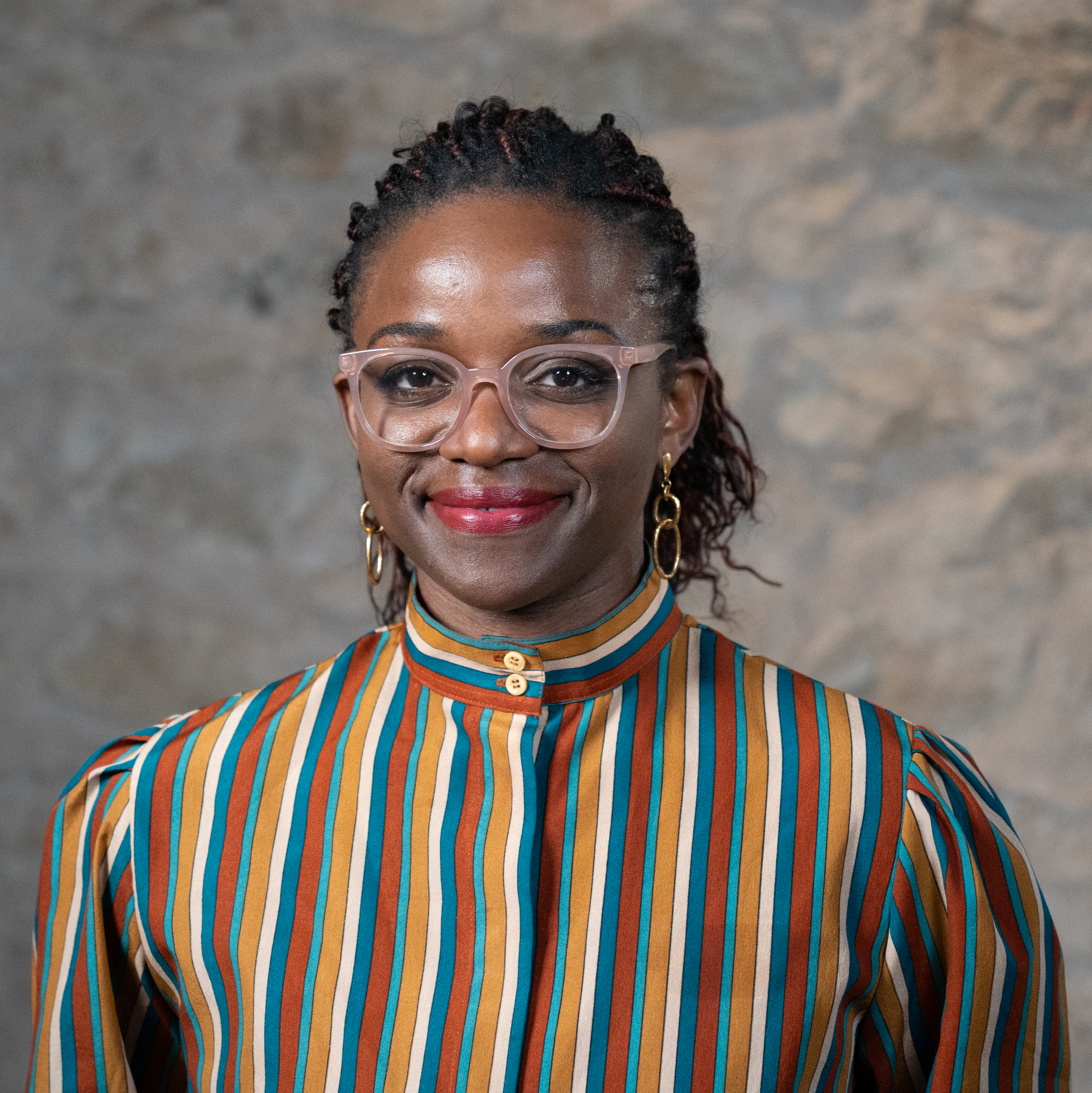
- Owono at SXSW 2025
- Born: 1986 (age 39–40); Cameroon
- Education: Master in International Law
- Alma mater: Sorbonne Law School
- Occupation: Lawyer

Julie Owono (born 1986) is a French and Cameroonian lawyer and academic researcher. As of 2021, she serves as executive director of Internet Without Borders (IWB), and as an inaugural member of Facebook's independent Oversight Board. She is affiliated with leading academic centers at the intersection of business, human rights, and artificial intelligence.

== Early life ==
Owono was born in Cameroon and grew up in Russia and France. She is a polyglot, fluent in five languages including Russian and Ewondo, her mother tongue. Owono received a master's degree in International Law from La Sorbonne University Paris, France. She has worked as a blogger for Global Voices and an opinion columnist for Al-Jazeera, commenting on the politics of the Gulf of Guinea. Between 2012 and 2020 she analyzed and commented on international news for several programs in French and English on the French public international channel France 24.

== Internet Sans Frontieres ==
By the mid-2010s, Owono was active in Internet Sans Frontieres, "a Paris-based non-profit organization advocating for freedom of expression on the internet", becoming head of its Africa desk. In that capacity, she lauded the growth of internet growth in African countries, but cautioned that their governments must avoid censoring the internet, stating that "[a] government cannot say that it wants to fully get into the digital economy and treat the essential commodity of that economy in the way we have seen so far".

In 2018 and 2019, Owono sought to pressure the government of Chad to restore internet access that had been cut off certain parts of the country. Owono indicated that the restriction occurred "because videos of violent clashes among the Zaghawa tribe in northern Chad were being shared on WhatsApp". Owono sought to persuade western military allies to pressure the government of Chad to restore access but was disappointed in the response. Owono also oversaw a fundraiser to buy premium VPN access for journalists and activists, which raised €2,000 ($2250).

In 2020, Owono was one of 20 individuals from around the world named to the Facebook Oversight Board, an organization established to make consequential precedential decisions about content moderation on the platforms of Facebook and Instagram.

As of 2023, Owono is the Executive Director at IWB. In July 2023, following a recommendation from the oversight board to deplatform Cambodian head of state Hun Sen, the government of Cambodia listed Owono as one of 22 people connected with Meta who were banned from entering the country.

== META Oversight Board ==
Julie Owono has served as an inaugural member of the Meta Oversight Board since its establishment in 2020. In this capacity, she contributes to the Board's mission of reviewing and making binding decisions on complex content moderation cases across Meta's platforms, including Facebook and Instagram. Owono's work emphasizes the importance of upholding freedom of expression while addressing harmful content.

Beyond her adjudicative responsibilities, Owono actively engages in public discourse on content governance. She has participated in various events and discussions, including appearances on podcasts such as "Wonks and War Rooms", where she elaborated on the Oversight Board's processes and the challenges of content moderation. Her insights contribute to broader conversations about transparency, accountability, and the evolving responsibilities of social media platforms in managing online speech.

== Affiliations and research ==
Julie Owono is deeply engaged in advancing the intersection of business, human rights, and artificial intelligence through her affiliations with several academic and research institutions. She is a researcher at the Berkman Klein Center for Internet & Society at Harvard University, where she focuses on content governance, digital rights, and the ethical implications of emerging technologies. At the Berkeley Human Rights Center, she further explores the impact of artificial intelligence on marginalized populations and global digital economies.

Previously, Owono established the Content Policy and Society Lab (CPSL) at Stanford University, a research laboratory dedicated to studying the application of the multi-stakeholder approach to the governance of emerging technologies (Stanford PACS). CPSL was instrumental in examining how diverse voices, including civil society, policymakers, and technology companies, can collaborate to create inclusive governance frameworks for AI and other advanced technologies.

Beyond academia, Owono is a prominent Board Director and Advisory Board Member for several international organizations committed to digital rights, freedom of expression, and the ethical use of AI. She is a board member of the Committee to Protect Journalists (CPJ), Witness, Meedan, and the Dangerous Speech Project. Additionally, she serves on the Advisory Board of Latimer AI, an initiative focused on creating inclusive AI frameworks that respect human rights.

Owono’s work reflects her commitment to advocating for ethical governance in the age of AI, ensuring that emerging technologies are developed and deployed in ways that uphold global human rights standards while incorporating diverse, multi-stakeholder perspectives.

== Opinions ==
She believes that in a democratic society, there should be checks and balances in content moderation. Owono also says that there are three principles when imposing limits on speech; they must be legal, proportionate and necessary.

== Awards & Honors ==
Julie Owono has been recognized for her impactful work in the fields of Business, Digital rights, Internet governance, and Human rights. Below is a listing of her key awards and honors:

- 2019-2021: Practitioner Fellow, Digital Civil Society Lab, Stanford PACS, Stanford University
- 2019-2020: Fellow, Berkman Klein Center, Harvard University
- 2020: One of the 100 Most Influential Africans, New African Magazine
- 2021: Listed by Nob Hill Gazette of San Francisco as one of the most powerful women
- 2022: Business Personality of the Year, French-American Chamber of Commerce of San Francisco
- 2022: Fellow, Program on Democracy and the Internet, Stanford PACS, Stanford University
- 2024: Fellow, Human Rights Center, University of California, Berkeley
