= Always in My Heart (film) =

1942 film

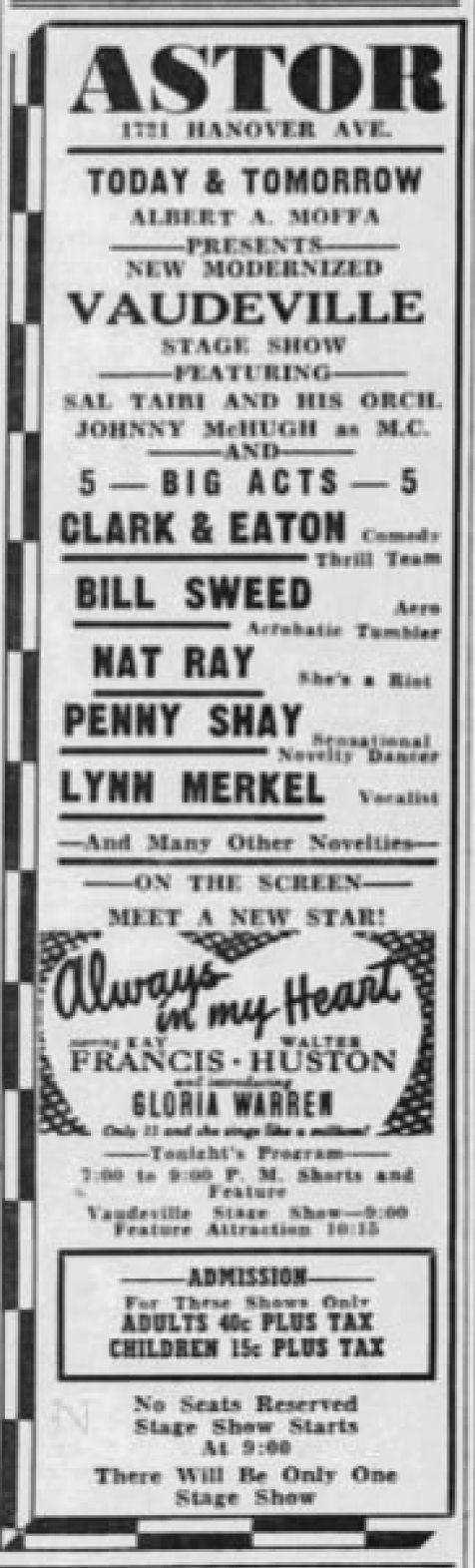
- Newspaper advertisement with film as an upcoming attraction
- Directed by: Jo Graham
- Screenplay by: Adele Comandini
- Based on: Fly Away Home; 1935 play by Dorothy Bennett; Irving White
- Produced by: William Jacobs (associate producer); Walter MacEwen (associate producer)
- Starring: Kay Francis; Walter Huston; Diana Hale; Frankie Thomas; Borrah Minevitch; The Harmonica Rascals; Gloria Warren
- Cinematography: Sidney Hickox
- Edited by: Thomas Pratt
- Music by: Heinz Roemheld
- Distributed by: Warner Bros. Pictures
- Release date: March 14, 1942
- Running time: 92 minutes
- Country: United States
- Language: English
- Budget: $515,000
- Box office: $2,098,000

Always in My Heart is a 1942 American drama film directed by Jo Graham and starring Kay Francis and Walter Huston. The song "Siempre en Mi Corazón" ("Always in My Heart"), by Ernesto Lecuona (music and Spanish lyrics) and Kim Gannon (English lyrics) was nominated for an Oscar for Best Original Song.

== Plot ==
MacKenzie Scott, a brilliant musician, is falsely convicted of murder and sentenced to life. While Scott languishes in prison, his long-suffering ex-wife Marjorie raises their two children to adulthood. Out of respect for Scott, whom she still loves, Marjorie never reveals to the kids that their father is in jail, insisting instead that Scott has long since died.

== Cast ==
- Kay Francis as Marjorie 'Mudge' Scott
- Walter Huston as MacKenzie 'Mac' Scott
- Gloria Warren as Victoria 'Vickie' Scott
- Diana Hale as Booley, Angie's Granddaughter (credited as Patty Hale)
- Frankie Thomas as Martin 'Marty' Scott
- Una O'Connor as Angie, Scotts' Housekeeper
- Sidney Blackmer as Philip Ames
- Armida as Lolita
- Frank Puglia as Joe Borelli
- Russell Arms as Red
- Anthony Caruso as Frank
- Elvira Curci as Rosita Borelli
- John Hamilton as Warden
- Harry Lewis as Steve
- Herbert Gunn as Dick
- Borrah Minevitch as Blackie
- The Harmonica Rascals as Themselves

== Box office ==
The film earned $524,000 in the US and Canada and $1,574,000 elsewhere.
