= Alexander Calvert =

Canadian actor

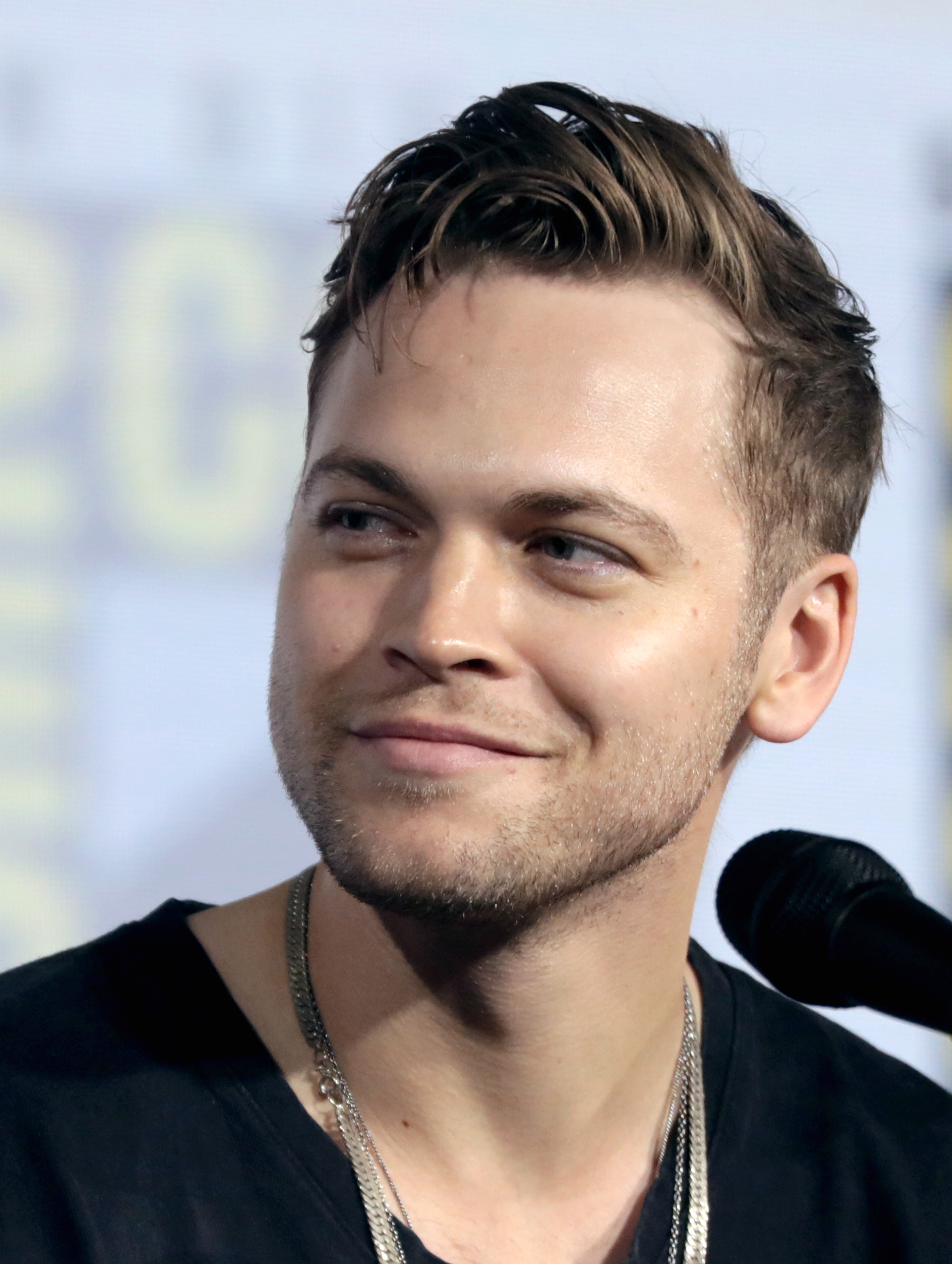
- Calvert at the 2019 San Diego Comic-Con
- Born: Vancouver, Canada
- Occupation: Actor
- Years active: 2005–present

Alexander Calvert is a Canadian actor best known for playing the role of Jack Kline on the CW show Supernatural and The Winchesters.

== Early life ==
A native of Vancouver, Calvert studied musical theatre and hip hop dancing until the age of 15, when he became interested in acting.

== Career ==
He has appeared in several films and television series, including the Nickelodeon series The Troop, To Be Fat like Me, and The Dead Zone, and was young Justin in Kickin' It Old Skool. On July 17, 2015, it was announced that Calvert was cast as Lonnie Machin for season 4 of the CW's Arrow.

In 2017, Calvert was cast as Jack, a nephilim fathered by Lucifer and raised by Dean and Sam Winchester and the angel Castiel in Supernatural. He debuted in the season 12 finale, and was a regular cast member for the remainder of the series.

== Filmography ==
=== Film ===
Year	Title	Role	Notes	Ref.
2007	Kickin' It Old Skool	Young Justin Schumacher		
2008	Lost Boys: The Tribe	Grom	Direct-to-video	
2012	Flicka: Country Pride	Jesse	Direct-to-video	
2013	Homesick	Greg	Short film	
2013	If I Had Wings	Vince Bernard		
2015	Lost After Dark	Johnnie	Direct-to-video	
2015	The Blackburn Asylum	Luke		
2016	The Edge of Seventeen	Nick Mossman		
2018	The Package	Chad		
2019	Good Boys	Daniel		
2024	Lowlifes	Deputy White		
2025	Double Exposure	Peter		

=== Television ===
Year	Title	Role	Notes
2005	The Dead Zone	Greg Stillson (age 12)	Episode: "Broken Circle"
2006	Psych	Jiri Prochazka	Episode: "Spellingg Bee"
2007	To Be Fat like Me	Robbie	TV movie
2007	Devil's Diary	Teenage Boy #2	TV movie
2010	The Troop	Evan	Episode: "Wrath of the Wraith"
2010	Human Target	Sean	Episode: "The Other Side of the Mall"
2012	Virtual Lies	Tyler Sanderson	TV movie
2013	Bates Motel	Ra'uf	2 episodes
2014	Motive	James Dent	Episode: "Angels with Dirty Faces"
2015	The Returned	Hunter Gibbs	Recurring role
2015–2016	Arrow	Lonnie Machin / Anarky	Recurring role
2016	Unser Traum von Kanada	Josh	Miniseries
2016	Scream	Alex Whitman / Tom Martin	2 episodes
2017–2020	Supernatural	Jack Kline / Belphegor	Episode: "All Along the Watchtower" (season 12); Main cast (seasons 13–15)
2023	The Winchesters	Jack Kline	Episode: "Hey, That's No Way to Say Goodbye"
2023–2025	Gen V	Rufus	Recurring role
