= Rita Johnson =

American actress (1913–1965)

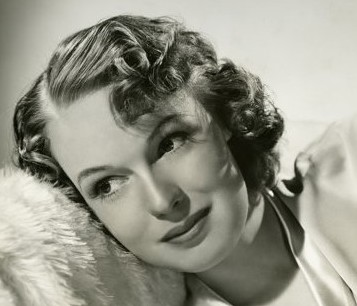
- Johnson in 1937
- Born: Rita Ann Johnson; August 13, 1913; Worcester, Massachusetts, U.S.
- Died: October 31, 1965 (aged 52); Hollywood, Los Angeles, California, U.S.
- Resting place: Holy Cross Cemetery, Culver City, California
- Occupation: Actress
- Years active: 1935–1957
- Known for: Joyce Jordan, M.D.; The Big Clock
- Spouses: Stanley Kahn (m. 1940; div. 1943) Edwin Hutzler (m. 1943; div. 1946)

Rita Ann Johnson (August 13, 1913 – October 31, 1965) was an American actress.

== Early years ==
Johnson was born in Worcester, Massachusetts, the daughter of a trolley conductor, William J. Johnson and a lunchroom operator Lillian E. Johnson.

She worked as a waitress in her mother's lunchroom and sold hot dogs on the Boston-Worcester turnpike. She later attended the New England Conservatory of Music.

== Career ==
Starting in 1933, Rita decided to become a stage actress despite being told by her high school drama teacher that she had no talent. She spent several years working with various stock companies, such as the Louise Galloway Players. By early 1937, Rita made a favorable impression in George M. Cohan's comedy, Fulton of Oak Falls and was recruited to Hollywood with a contract with Metro-Goldwyn-Mayer.

Johnson was also busy in radio, proving her versatility on several dramatic programs. "By 1936 she... was appearing in ten radio shows a week." She played the leading role in Joyce Jordan, M.D..

Johnson began her film career at M.G.M. in the leading feminine role in London By Night. Before the release of that film, Rita was assigned to replace the late Jean Harlow's role in the unfinished film, Saratoga. The studio planned to reshoot the entire film. Devoted Jean Harlow's fans erupted in protest and the studio decided to keep the Harlow footage in the film and shot a few more scenes using a voice and body double.

London By Night was not a suceess and Johnson found herself relegated to small supporting roles for a couple of years. Critics contnued to praise her performances despite the minor roles and M.G.M. began the process of building her star status. By mid-1940, Johnson had the important feminine role of Mary Stilwell opposite Spencer Tracy in the biopic Edison, the Man. Her performance garnered some of the best review of her career thus far.

Unhappy with a proposed minor role in Maisie Was a Lady (1941), Johnson balked and asked to be released from her Metro contract.

After her four year tenure at M.G.M., Johnson became a freelance player and gained a reputation as the silken "Other Woman". She also proved her versatility in such films as the murderer in Here Comes Mr. Jordan (1941), the haughty fiancee in The Major and the Minor (1942), the sympathetic mother in the color film, My Friend Flicka, and a doomed wife in the classic RKO film noir They Won't Believe Me (1947).

In an incident that was never fully explained, Johnson suffered a head trauma on September 6, 1948 that required brain surgery. Unsubstantiated rumors promulgated by gossip columnists such as Walter Winchell suggested she might have been abused by a boyfriend, but the only explanation she offered was that a large, industrial-grade hair dryer at her apartment had fallen on her. She was in a coma for two weeks and it was reported, "It took her a year to recover. Her left side was paralyzed temporarily, and for a while she couldn't walk." It put a virtual halt to her film career. Her screen time in movies after that was limited to four films due to her reduced mobility and powers of concentration. She also appeared in several television shows without much success.

== Personal life ==
Johnson was married to businessman L. Stanley Kahn. They were granted a divorce on June 29, 1943. She remarried Kahn at the end of December that same year. Although, the couple separated again in mid-1944, she did not file for divorce until mid-1947.

Reports of a second marriage to Edwin Hutzler in 1947 or 1948 have been difficult to substantiate beyond gossip columns.

Johnson suffered from alcoholism. She died of a brain hemorrhage on October 31, 1965, at age 52.

== Partial filmography ==
- London by Night (1937) – Patricia Herrick
- My Dear Miss Aldrich (1937) – Ellen Warfield
- Man-Proof (1938) – Florence
- Letter of Introduction (1938) – Honey
- Smashing the Rackets (1938) – Letty Lane
- Rich Man, Poor Girl (1938) – Sally Harrison
- The Girl Downstairs (1938) – Rosalind Brown
- Honolulu (1939) – Cecelia Grayson
- Within the Law (1939) – Agnes
- Broadway Serenade (1939) – Judith Tyrrell
- 6,000 Enemies (1939) – Anne Barry
- Stronger Than Desire (1939) – Barbara Winter
- They All Come Out (1939) – Kitty Carson
- Nick Carter, Master Detective (1939) – Lou Farnsby
- Congo Maisie (1940) – Kay McWade
- The Golden Fleecing (1940) – Marian Edwards
- Edison, the Man (1940) – Mary Stilwell
- Forty Little Mothers (1940) – Mary Blake
- Maisie Was a Lady (1941) – Minor Role (scenes deleted)
- Here Comes Mr. Jordan (1941) – Julia Farnsworth
- Appointment for Love (1941) – Nancy Benson
- The Major and the Minor (1942) – Pamela Hill
- My Friend Flicka (1943) – Nell McLaughlin
- The Affairs of Susan (1945) – Mona Kent
- Thunderhead, Son of Flicka (1945) – Nelle McLaughlin
- The Naughty Nineties (1945) – Bonita Farrow
- Pardon My Past (1945) – Mary Pemberton
- The Perfect Marriage (1947) – Mabel Manning
- The Michigan Kid (1947) – Sue Dawson
- They Won't Believe Me (1947) – Greta Ballentine
- Sleep, My Love (1948) – Barby
- The Big Clock (1948) – Pauline York
- An Innocent Affair (1948) – Eve Lawrence
- Family Honeymoon (1948) – Minna Fenster
- The Second Face (1950) – Claire Elwood
- Susan Slept Here (1954) – Dr. Rawley, Harvey's Shrink
- Emergency Hospital (1956) – Head Nurse Norma Mullin
- All Mine to Give (1957) – Katie Tyler (final film role)

== Radio appearances ==
Year	Program	Episode/source
1943	Lux Radio Theatre	My Friend Flicka
1952	Family Theater	The Crossroads of Christmas
