= Green Grass of Wyoming =

1948 film by Louis King

- Theatrical release poster
- Directed by: Louis King
- Screenplay by: Martin Berkeley
- Based on: Green Grass of Wyoming; 1946 novel by Mary O'Hara
- Produced by: Robert Bassler
- Starring: Peggy Cummins; Charles Coburn; Robert Arthur
- Cinematography: Charles G. Clarke
- Edited by: Nick DeMaggio
- Music by: Cyril J. Mockridge
- Color process: Technicolor
- Production company: 20th Century Fox
- Distributed by: 20th Century Fox
- Release date: June 3, 1948
- Running time: 89 minutes
- Country: United States
- Language: English
- Budget: $2 million
- Box office: $2.1 million (US rentals)

Green Grass of Wyoming is a 1948 American Western film directed by Louis King and starring Peggy Cummins, Charles Coburn and Robert Arthur.

The screenplay, written by Martin Berkeley, is based on the third book in the popular, "My Friend Flicka" trilogy, written by Mary O'Hara. The film follows the further adventures of the McLaughlin family who live on a horse ranch in Wyoming. Marilyn Monroe appeared as an uncredited extra.

The original cast from the first two films did not reprise their roles in the third.

== Plot ==
Horse owner Beaver Greenway is angry when Thunderhead, the white stallion that owner Ken McLaughlin freed some years earlier, steals another of his mares. Greenway confronts Ken's father, Rob, at the Goose Bar Ranch. Rob organizes other ranchers to hunt for Thunderhead who, like his great-grandsire the Albino before him, has stolen many mares from local ranches.

Meanwhile, Ken returns from a horse-selling trip but, to Rob's displeasure, has used the profits to buy a trotter race horse named Crown Jewel. After his initial skepticism, Rob allows the mare to be trained for harness racing. One night, Thunderhead appears and runs off with Crown Jewel. The next day, Rob leads a search party to find Crown Jewel and shoot Thunderhead, though Ken is determined to save him. They locate and round-up Thunderhead's herd, but the stallion and Crown Jewel escape. Ken finds the pair hiding nearby and persuades Thunderhead to return to the ranch for good.

When Crown Jewel develops altitude sickness from living in the Wyoming hills, a veterinarian advises putting her down due to congested lungs; Greenway instead recommends an old-fashioned remedy that works. Meanwhile, Ken and Greenway's granddaughter, Carey, develop a romance.

Crown Jewel, fully recovered and trained, is entered in the Ohio Governor's Cup sweepstakes. Greenway, a former sulky driver is competing with his own horse, Sundance. Ken drives Crown Jewel, who is leading, but she breaks stride during the race, disqualifying them. Greenway and Sundance win. However, the McLaughlins are proud of Crown Jewel's effort, particularly upon learning she is in foal and Thunderhead is the sire.

== Cast ==
- Peggy Cummins as Carey Greenway
- Charles Coburn as Beaver Greenway
- Robert Arthur as Ken McLaughlin
- Lloyd Nolan as Rob McLaughlin
- Burl Ives as Gus
- Geraldine Wall as Nell McLaughlin

== Production ==
Parts of the film were shot in Strawberry Valley, Three Lakes, Kanab Race Track, Rockville Road, Panguitch Lake, and Cedar Breaks National Monument in Utah.

The final race during the last 18 minutes of the film was filmed in Lancaster, Ohio at the Fairfield County Fair Grounds.

== See also ==
- List of films about horses
- List of films about horse racing
