= Hugh Wedlock Jr. =

American screenwriter

- Born: Hugh Thomas Wedlock Jr. February 15, 1908; Brooklyn, New York, U.S.
- Died: December 13, 1993 (aged 85); Los Angeles, California, U.S.
- Occupation: Screenwriter

Hugh Thomas Wedlock Jr. (February 15, 1908 - December 13, 1993) was an American screenwriter. He worked with Howard Snyder writing for Jack Benny's radio and television program The Jack Benny Program; he also wrote for The Red Skelton Show and The Gisele MacKenzie Show. Wedlock died in December 1993 of heart failure in Los Angeles, California, at the age of 85.
