= Mary O'Hara (author) =

American novelist

Mary O'Hara Alsop (July 10, 1885 – October 14, 1980) was an American author, screenwriter, pianist, and composer best known for the novel My Friend Flicka.

O'Hara was a Hollywood screenwriter for silent era films that include The Prisoner of Zenda (1922), Braveheart (1925), and Framed (1927).

In 1961, she performed her folk musical composition The Catch Colt at the Catholic University of America, Washington, D.C. She was the author of several books including Let Us Say Grace (1930), My Friend Flicka (1941), and Novel-in-the-Making (1954). She died from arteriosclerosis on October 14, 1980, in Chevy Chase, Maryland.

== Biography ==
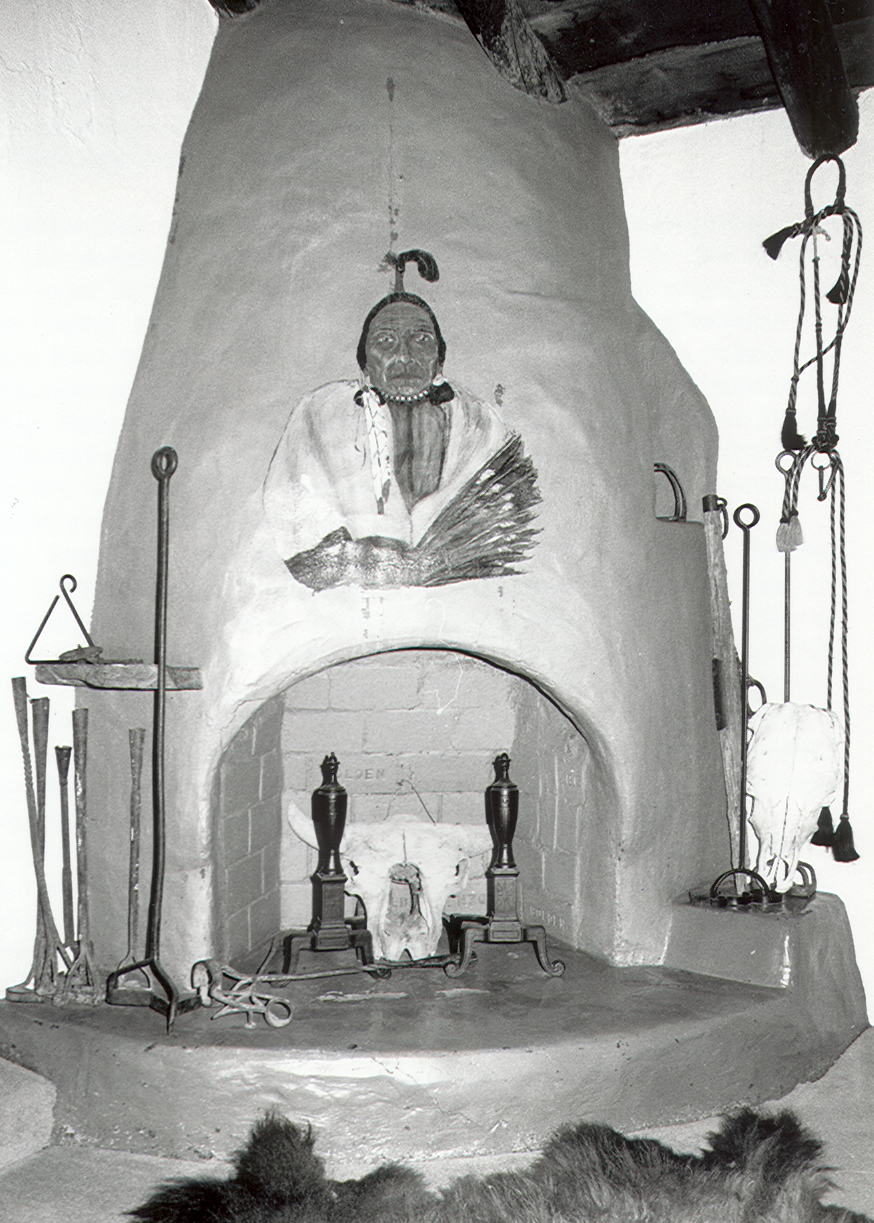
The room on the Remount Ranch outside Cheyenne, Wyoming where Mary O'Hara wrote "My Friend Flicka" was made into a "bar room" around 1946.

Mary O'Hara Alsop was born July 10, 1885, in Cape May Point, New Jersey, the third child of the Reverend Dr. Reese Fell Alsop and Mary Lee Spring. O'Hara, who was named after her maternal grandmother, Mary O'Hara Spring (née Denny), grew up in Brooklyn Heights, New York. Her siblings included an older sister, the writer Gulielma ("Elma") Fell; an older brother, Reese; and a younger sister, Elizabeth ("Bess"). She was a descendant of William Penn.

She married her third cousin, Kent Kane Parrot, in 1905 against her father's wishes. They had a daughter, O'Hara Parrot, born in 1908, who later died of skin cancer, and a son, Kay (Ken) Parrot (born in 1910).

Following the end of her marriage to Parrot, Mary O'Hara worked as a Hollywood screenwriter during the silent film era. Her screenwriting credits included the movies The Last Card (1921), Turn to the Right (1922), The Prisoner of Zenda (1922), Braveheart (1925), and Framed (1927).

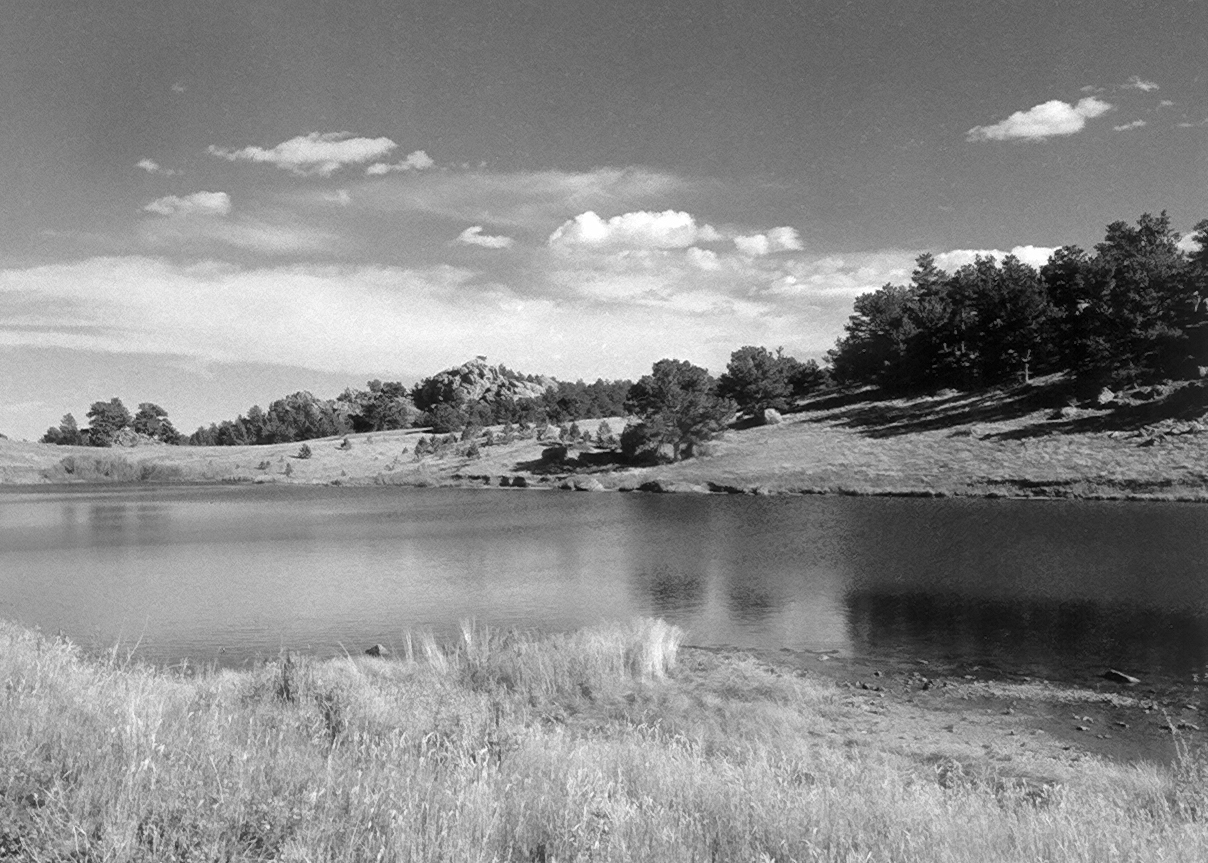
A rocky, pine-covered ridge runs through the center of the Remount Ranch in Southeastern Wyoming where Mary O'Hara lived for 11 years. The ranch is located on the eastern slope of the Laramie Mountains at more than 7,500 in elevation.

In 1922 she married Helge Sture-Vasa, a Swede who had experience working horses in the U.S. Army Remount Service, and they moved to Wyoming. In 1930 the couple bought a ranch which had been established in 1886 in Laramie County, between Laramie and Cheyenne. They renamed it Remount Ranch, and stocked the ranch with sheep, which were at that time a profitable endeavor. The Great Depression wrecked the sheep market and any hope for profits for O'Hara and her husband. To make ends meet, they eked out a living delivering milk in Cheyenne and breeding horses. Subsequently, O'Hara ran a summer camp for boys on holiday from Eastern prep schools.

Yet it was her typewriter, not livestock, that proved most profitable for O'Hara. With the rugged Remount as a backdrop, she began writing Wyoming ranch stories. Her best known and loved works were written at this time: My Friend Flicka (1941), Thunderhead (1943), and Green Grass of Wyoming (1946). The books were so popular that they have been translated in many languages such as: Arabic, Dutch, Portuguese, Spanish, Cambodian, Burmese, Norwegian, Swedish, German, Japanese and Korean.

O'Hara and her husband sold the Remount in 1946 and purchased a ranch in California. The following year Mary O'Hara divorced her second husband, and returned alone to the Eastern U.S., settling in Monroe, Connecticut, where she continued to write fiction and non-fiction.

Mary O'Hara was also an accomplished pianist and composer. She composed a folk musical, "The Catch Colt," which was performed in 1961 at the Catholic University of America in Washington, D.C., and at the Lincoln Theatre in Cheyenne, Wyoming. The musical was published in 1964. Two years later, O'Hara published her account of writing, composing and producing the musical, "A Musical in the Making."

Her other piano compositions included "Esperan" (1943), "Green Grass of Wyoming" (1946), "May God Keep You" (1946), and "Wind Harp" (1954).

In 1968, she moved to Chevy Chase, Maryland, where she lived until her death on October 14, 1980, at the age of 95 of arteriosclerosis.

== Books ==
- Let Us Say Grace (1930)
- My Friend Flicka (1941)
- Thunderhead (1943)
- Green Grass of Wyoming (1946)
- The Son of Adam Wyngate (1952)
- Novel-in-the-Making (1954)
- Wyoming Summer (1963); based on O'Hara's diary
- A Musical in the Making (1966); O'Hara's account of writing, composing and producing the musical, "The Catch Colt"
- Flicka's Friend (1982); O'Hara's autobiography, published posthumously

== See also ==
- Flicka (a 2006 film adaptation of O'Hara's book)
- My Friend Flicka (a 1943 coming-of-age film based on Mary O'Hara's novel)
- Thunderhead, Son of Flicka (a 1945 sequel to the 1943 film My Friend Flicka)
- My Friend Flicka (TV series) first broadcast from February 1956 to May 1958.

== Sources ==
- Biography of Mary O'Hara from Georgetown University Libraries, Special Collections
  - Mary O'Hara papers, 1900-2015
- https://www.harpercollins.com/blogs/authors/mary-ohara-880000020537
