= Howard Snyder =

American screenwriter

- Born: May 24, 1909; New York, U.S.
- Died: April 13, 1963 (aged 53); Los Angeles, California, U.S.
- Occupation: Screenwriter
- Spouse: Leslie Snyder

Howard Snyder (May 24, 1909 - April 13, 1963) was an American screenwriter. He wrote for Jack Benny's radio and television program The Jack Benny Program from 1936 to the early 1960s, often in partnership with Hugh Wedlock Jr., and also wrote for 20th Century Fox, Warner Bros., Universal and Paramount. Snyder died in April 1963 in a traffic accident in Los Angeles, California, at the age of 53.
