= Draegerman Courage =

1937 film by Louis King

- Directed by: Louis King
- Screenplay by: Anthony Coldeway
- Produced by: Bryan Foy
- Starring: Jean Muir; Barton MacLane; Henry O'Neill; Robert Barrat; Addison Richards; Helen MacKellar
- Cinematography: Gilbert Warrenton
- Edited by: Jack Killifer
- Music by: Heinz Roemheld
- Production company: Warner Bros. Pictures
- Distributed by: Warner Bros. Pictures
- Release date: May 15, 1937
- Running time: 58 minutes
- Country: United States
- Language: English

Draegerman Courage is a 1937 American drama film directed by Louis King and written by Anthony Coldeway. The film stars Jean Muir, Barton MacLane, Henry O'Neill, Robert Barrat, Addison Richards and Helen MacKellar. The film was released by Warner Bros. Pictures on May 15, 1937.

== Cast ==
- Jean Muir as Ellen Haslett
- Barton MacLane as Andrew Beaupre
- Henry O'Neill as Dr. Thomas Haslett
- Robert Barrat as Martin Crane
- Addison Richards as John McNally
- Helen MacKellar as Mrs. Mary Haslett
- Gordon Oliver as Pete Lawson
- Joseph Crehan as Dr. Stuart Hunter
- Priscilla Lyon as Suzanne Haslett
- Walter Miller as Maxwell
- Herbert Heywood as Steve
- Ben Hendricks Jr. as Captain Harper
