= Ann Shoemaker =

American actress (1891–1978)

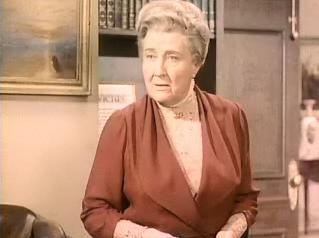
- Shoemaker in the trailer for Sunrise at Campobello (1960)
- Born: Anne Dorothea Shoemaker; January 10, 1891; Brooklyn, New York, U.S.
- Died: September 18, 1978 (aged 87); Los Angeles, California, U.S.
- Resting place: Kensico Cemetery; Valhalla, New York; 41.0779°N 73.7865°W
- Occupation: Actress
- Years active: 1928–1976
- Spouse(s): Louis Leon Hall (m. 1914, divorced) Henry Stephenson (m. 1922; died 1956)
- Children: Anne Hall

Ann Shoemaker (born Anne Dorothea Shoemaker; January 10, 1891 – September 18, 1978) was an American actress who appeared in 70 films and TV movies between 1928 and 1976. She portrayed Sara Roosevelt, mother of Franklin D. Roosevelt, in both the stage and film versions of Sunrise at Campobello. Early in her career, her name was often seen as Anne Dorothy Shoemaker.

== Early years ==
Shoemaker was the daughter of Mr. and Mrs. Charles Frederick Shoemaker. Her father was an officer in the Army.

== Career ==
Shoemaker acted with the Orpheum Players at the Chestnut Street Theatre in Philadelphia, initially appearing with that group in September 1909. After one season there, David Belasco engaged her for a supporting role in Nobody's Widow. In the summer of 1911, she acted with the Albee Stock Company in Providence, Rhode Island. By 1914, she was performing with the Baker Stock Company in Portland, Oregon. At that time, she was the youngest leading lady in American stock theater. In October 1914, she became the leading lady of the Baldwin Players in Duluth, Minnesota.

In 1917, Shoemaker left Omaha, Nebraska, after 12 weeks with the stock company there. She joined the Keith Stock Company in Union Hill, New Jersey, so that she could be closer to her year-old daughter, who was being kept by Shoemaker's mother and sister in New York.

In June 1921, Shoemaker signed a five-year contract to act at the Booth Theatre in New York City.

Shoemaker's Broadway credits include Half a Sixpence (1965), Sunrise at Campobello (1958), The Living Room (1954), Twilight Walk (1951), Dream Girl (1951), Woman Bites Dog (1946), The Rich Full Life (1945), Proof Thro' the Night (1942), Ah, Wilderness! (1941), Black Sheep (1932), The Silent Witness (1931), The Novice and the Duke (1929), Button, Button (1919), To-Night at 12 (1928), Speak Easy (1927), We All Do (1927), The Noose (1926), and The Great God Brown (1926).

== Personal life ==
She had two marriages. On April 22, 1914, in Portland, Oregon, she married actor Louis Leon Hall, with whom she acted in the Baker Stock Company. Their daughter, Anne, became a song lyricist. After divorcing, she was later married to the actor Henry Stephenson from 1922 until his death in 1956.

== Partial filmography ==
- Chance at Heaven (1933) - Mrs. Harris
- Cross Country Cruise (1934) - Mrs. O'Shaughnessy - Baby's Mother (uncredited)
- Dr. Monica (1934) - Mrs. Hazlitt
- Cheating Cheaters (1934) - Mrs. Grace Palmer
- The Woman in Red (1935) - Cora Furness (uncredited)
- A Dog of Flanders (1935) - Frau Ilse Cogez
- Stranded (1935) - Mrs. Tuthill
- Alice Adams (1935) - Mrs. Adams
- Sins of Man (1936) - Anna Engel
- Shall We Dance (1937) - Matron
- They Won't Forget (1937) - Mrs. Mountford
- Stella Dallas (1937) - Miss Margaret Phillibrown
- The Life of the Party (1937) - Countess Martos
- Romance of the Redwoods (1939) - Mother Manning
- Almost a Gentleman (1939) - Mrs. Thompson (uncredited)
- They All Come Out (1939) - Dr. Ellen Hollis
- Babes in Arms (1939) - Mrs. Barton
- The Farmer's Daughter (1940) - Mrs. Bingham
- Seventeen (1940) - Mary Baxter
- The Marines Fly High (1940) - Mrs. Hill
- Curtain Call (1940) - Mrs. Middleton
- An Angel from Texas (1940) - Addie Lou Coleman
- My Favorite Wife (1940) - Ma - Nick's Mother
- Girl from Avenue A (1940) - Mrs. Maddox
- Strike Up the Band (1940) - Mrs. Connors
- Ellery Queen, Master Detective (1940) - Lydia Braun
- Scattergood Pulls the Strings (1941) - Mrs. Downs
- You'll Never Get Rich (1941) - Mrs. Barton
- Above Suspicion (1943) - Aunt Ellen
- What a Woman! (1943) - Senator's Wife (uncredited)
- Man from Frisco (1944) - Martha Kennedy
- Mr. Winkle Goes to War (1944) - Martha Pettigrew, Jack's Mother (uncredited)
- Thirty Seconds Over Tokyo (1944) - Mrs. Parker
- What a Blonde (1945) - Mrs. DaFoe
- Conflict (1945) - Nora Grant
- Magic Town (1947) - Ma Peterman
- Sitting Pretty (1948) - Mrs. Ashcroft (uncredited)
- The Return of the Whistler (1948) - Mrs. Barkley
- Wallflower (1948) - Mrs. Dixie James
- A Woman's Secret (1949) - Mrs. Matthews
- Shockproof (1949) - Dr. Daniels (uncredited)
- The Reckless Moment (1949) - Mrs. Catherine Feller (uncredited)
- House by the River (1950) - Mrs. Ambrose
- Sunrise at Campobello (1960) - Sara Delano Roosevelt
- The Fortune Cookie (1966) - Sister Veronica
