= White Fang (1936 film) =

1936 film by David Butler

- Theatrical release poster
- Directed by: David Butler
- Screenplay by: Sam Duncan; Gene Fowler; Hal Long
- Produced by: Bogart Rogers; Darryl F. Zanuck
- Starring: Michael Whalen; Jean Muir; Slim Summerville; Charles Winninger; John Carradine; Jane Darwell
- Cinematography: Arthur C. Miller
- Edited by: Irene Morra
- Music by: Hugo Friedhofer; Charles Maxwell
- Production company: 20th Century Fox
- Distributed by: 20th Century Fox
- Release date: July 17, 1936
- Running time: 70 minutes
- Country: United States
- Language: English

White Fang is a 1936 American action film directed by David Butler and written by Sam Duncan, Gene Fowler and Hal Long. The film stars Michael Whalen, Jean Muir, Slim Summerville, Charles Winninger, John Carradine and Jane Darwell. It is loosely based on the 1906 novel White Fang by Jack London. The film was released on July 17, 1936, by 20th Century Fox.

== Plot ==
A woman and her weakling brother inherit a mine, but when her brother commits suicide, their guide is accused of murder.

== Cast ==
- Michael Whalen as Gordon Weedon Scott
- Jean Muir as Sylvia Burgess
- Slim Summerville as Slats Magee
- Charles Winninger as Doc McFane
- John Carradine as Beauty Smith
- Jane Darwell as Maud Mahoney
- Thomas Beck as Hal Burgess
- Joseph Herrick as Kobi
- George Du Count as François
- Marie Chorre as Nomi
- Lightning as White Fang
