= Wings in the Dark =

1935 film by James Flood

- Theatrical release poster
- Directed by: James Flood
- Screenplay by: Jack Kirkland; Frank Partos; Dale Van Every (adaptation); E.H. Robinson (adaptation)
- Story by: Nell Shipman; Philip D. Hurn (Original story)
- Based on: the story "Eyes of the Eagle" by Nell Shipman, Philip D. Hurn
- Produced by: Arthur Hornblow, Jr.
- Starring: Myrna Loy; Cary Grant
- Cinematography: William C. Mellor
- Edited by: William Shea
- Music by: Heinz Roemheld
- Distributed by: Paramount Pictures
- Release date: February 1, 1935 (U.S.)
- Running time: 75 minutes
- Country: United States
- Language: English

Wings in the Dark is a 1935 film directed by James Flood and starring Myrna Loy and Cary Grant and focusing on a daring woman aviator and an inventor thrust into a desperate situation. Wings in the Dark was produced by Arthur Hornblow, Jr. The film was the first that Loy and Grant made together, although Loy's biographer Emily Leider says that Wings in the Dark "wastes their talents and prompts an unintentional laugh fest." The film remains notable as a rare movie depiction of a blind protagonist (played by Grant) during the 1930s, and is also known for its accomplished aerial photography directed by Dewey Wrigley.

== Plot ==
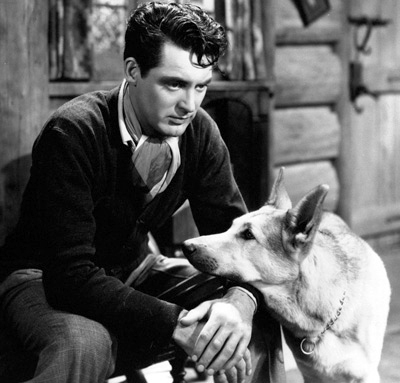
Cary Grant and Lightning in Wings in the Dark

Skywriter and stunt pilot Sheila Mason, who works as a barnstormer because women are not allowed in other aviation fields, is attracted to ace pilot Ken Gordon. Ken is trying to perfect instrument flying (flying "blind"), with his own design of an autopilot. He has devoted four years to perfecting the system and mortgaged his aircraft to finance his experiments. Before he can prove that his invention works, a stove accident blinds him.

When Ken retreats from the world, Mac, his friend and partner, brings him Lightning, a seeing eye dog. With the help of his dog, he learns to navigate around his household and keeps busy by writing aviation articles. Sheila, who has fallen in love with Ken, does not tell him that the articles are all being rejected. She gives him money to survive by taking on dangerous stunts arranged by her manager, Nick Williams.

Ken finally regains his confidence and is working on his autopilot when the Rockwell Aviation Company repossesses his aircraft. Distraught, Ken accuses Sheila of falling for him out of pity and sends her away. She plans a solo flight from Moscow to New York to win a $25,000 prize so they can marry.

Her last stage from Boston to New York finds Sheila nearly out of fuel and running into bad weather. She navigates by looking down to see where she is, but over Roosevelt Field, the fog is so heavy that she may not be able to land. With help from Mac, Ken sneaks into his old aircraft and takes off, using his autopilot to help Sheila land. While in the air, Ken talks to Sheila about his desperation of being blind and not having any future. His intention is to bring her to the ground and then fly until he runs out of fuel and crashes. The two pilots make it down, but Sheila deliberately crashes into Ken's aircraft to make sure that he will not try to kill himself.

A huge crowd has gathered at the airport. As the two greet the public and the press, Ken sees light from the flash bulbs of the photographers. Ken and Sheila embrace as their car goes through the throng of well-wishers.

== Cast ==
- Myrna Loy as Sheila Mason
- Cary Grant as Ken Gordon
- Roscoe Karns as Nick Williams
- Hobart Cavanaugh as Mac
- Dean Jagger as Top Harmon
- Russell Hopton as Jake Brashear
- Matt McHugh as 1st Mechanic
- Graham McNamee as Radio Announcer
- Lightning the dog

== Production ==
Principal photography for Wings in the Dark began on October 22, 1934. Captain Earl H. Robinson was the technical advisor on the film and adapted the screenplay with Dale Van Every. Amelia Earhart also visited the set as a consultant, and was photographed alongside Loy in front of the plane. Ken Gordon's aircraft is a Lockheed Model 8 Sirius; other aircraft include a Travel Air B 4000, flown by Sheila Mason, and a Lockheed Vega 5B. (Note: Although not mentioned in the credits, the aerial scenes were flown by noted film pilot Paul Mantz, with aircraft from his own fleet, including the Lockheed Vega used in the "Honeymoon Express.")

== Reception ==
In his review for The New York Times, film critic Andre Sennwald described the film as "... a pleasantly performed and skillfully filmed melodrama of the peacetime airways which is hampered by an addle-pated narrative. High altitudes have a tendency to make scenarists just a trifle giddy, with the result that the big climax of the Paramount's new photoplay has the appearance of having been composed during a tail spin."

Nell Shipman, one of the writers of the original story "Eyes of the Eagle", which pivoted upon a fictionalized version of Amelia Earhart, whom Shipman knew personally, was extremely disappointed by Myrna Loy's performance and the diminishing of the seeing eye dog as one of the main characters. Graham Greene called the film "as sentimental as it is improbable," but "... as exciting as it is naive."

However, the reviewer for the Daily Variety gushed over Loy's performance, claiming "her love scenes are superb...she is enchanting!"

Aviation historians consider Wings in the Dark one of a number of poorly done aviation films made during the early part of the Depression.
