= Douglas Haig (actor) =

Actor (1920–2011)

- Born: Douglas Patrick Haig; March 9, 1920; New Orleans, Louisiana, U.S.
- Died: February 1, 2011 (aged 90); West Hills, Los Angeles, California, U.S.
- Occupation: Actor
- Years active: 1922–1937

Douglas Patrick Haig (March 9, 1920 – February 1, 2011) was an American child actor appearing in films in the 1920s and 1930s. His career began at age two in silent films and (unlike many silent film actors) continued into sound films ("talkies").

From 1928 onward he appeared in at least 14 films. As a small child he was placid and pleasant-looking. In a scholarly review of Attorney for the Defense, a 1932 sound film, his performance is described as very annoying. The high point of Haig's career as a film actor came in 1935, with a starring role in Man's Best Friend (1935).

Before this he had appeared in both feature films and shorts such as The Family Group (1928), Sins of the Fathers (1928 lost silent film, of which only excerpts survive at the UCLA Film and Television Archives), Betrayal (1929, a silent film with talking sequences, synchronized music and sound effects), and Welcome Danger (1929).

In Man's Best Friend (1935), he starred in the lead role of Jed Strong, a boy whose abusive father wants to kill his dog. In 1986, TV Guide described the film as a “simple, unpretentious story of a little mountain boy and his pet police dog”.

Although some early films in which Haig appeared have been lost, the later film survive and of those a few have been released on DVD. These include Man's Best Friend (together with The Secret Code) and High Gear.

== Filmography ==
List of acting performances in film
Title	Year	Role	Notes
Woman-Wise	1937	Oscar	uncredited
Man's Best Friend	1935	Jed Strong	
High Gear	1933	Percy	
Call Her Savage	1932	Pete as a boy	uncredited; Willard Robertson plays Pete as a man; Clara Bow stars
That's My Boy	1932	Tommy as a young boy	
Attorney for the Defense	1932	Paul Wallace as a boy	
The Cisco Kid	1931	Billy	one of a series of films featuring The Cisco Kid, a wildly popular O. Henry character
The Spy	1931	Seryoska	
Caught Short	1930	Johnny	
Welcome Danger	1929	Buddy Lee or Roy	uncredited
Betrayal	1929	Peter	
Baby's Birthday	1929		uncredited
Sins of the Fathers	1928	Tom as a child	Tom as an adult is played by Barry Norton; a Famous Players–Lasky production with Emil Jannings, ZaSu Pitts, and Ruth Chatterton
”The Family Group”	1928		a 20-minute Charley Chase film co-directed by Leo McCarey
