= Man's Best Friend (1935 film) =

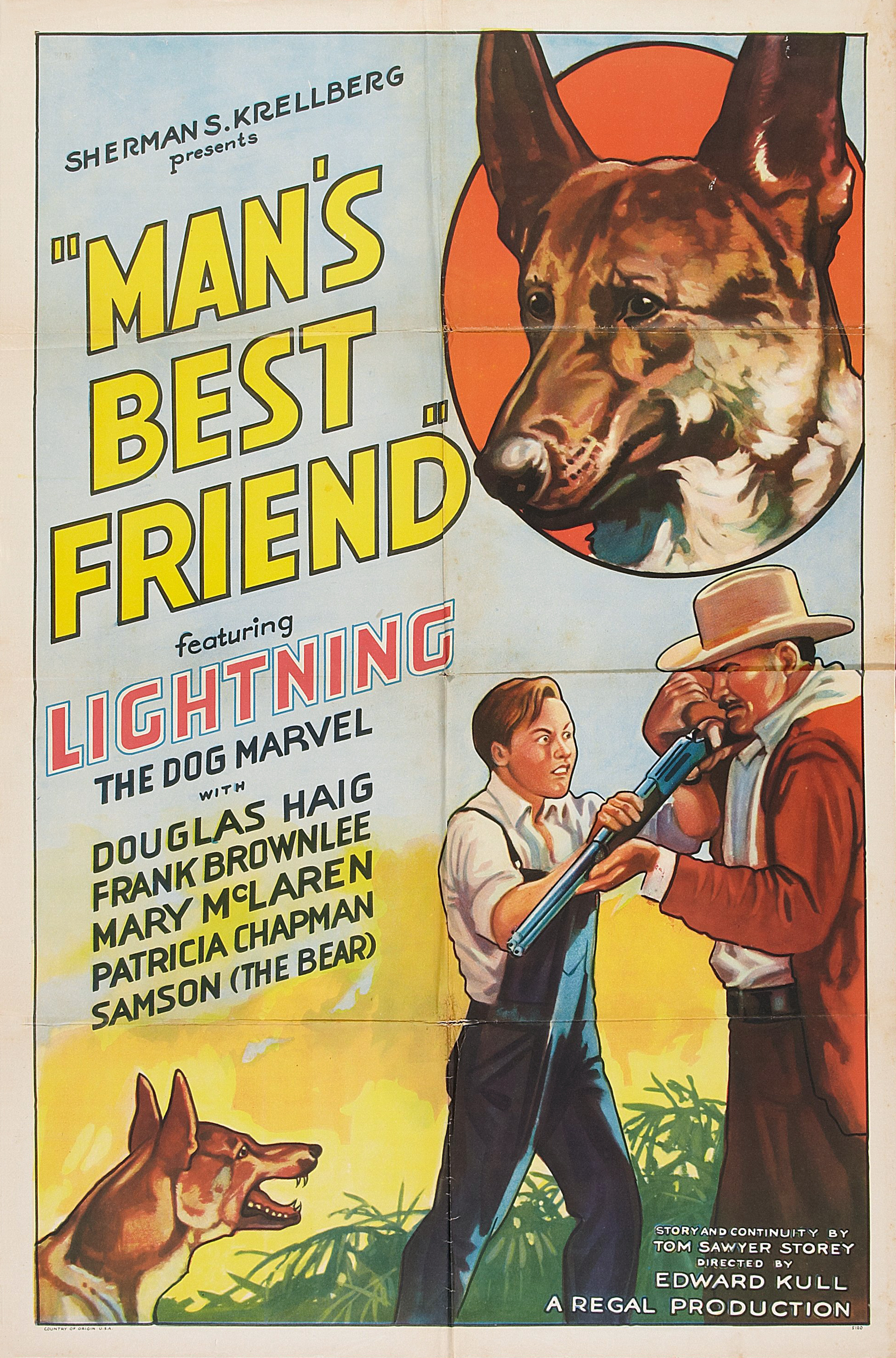
Thearical release poster

Man's Best Friend is a 1935 feature film about the adventures of a boy and his dog Lightning. The film stars Douglas Haig, an American child actor of the 1920s and 1930s; Lightning, a grandson of Strongheart; Frank Brownlee; and Mary McLaren.

Man's Best Friend was the high point of Douglas Haig's career as a film actor. In 1986, TV Guide described the film as a "simple, unpretentious story of a little mountain boy and his pet police dog".

Man's Best Friend has been released on DVD, together with The Silent Code by the DVD label Oldies.Com.

== Plot ==
A boy (Haig) and his dog Lightning find trouble with his father (Brownlee), whose treats the dog as a pest and a nuisance, rather than a pet, blaming the dog for the rampant deaths of various baby pigs on their farm.

Eventually, shortly after the boy gets off school for a summer vacation, his school teacher is trapped in a cave after a cave-in, and while getting help, Lightning is able to dig into the cave and save the teacher, still receiving no positive attention from the boys father.

Man's Best Friend
- Directed by: Edward Kull
- Starring: Douglas Haig; Lightning; Frank Brownlee; Mary McLaren
- Release date: 1935
- Running time: 62 minutes
- Country: United States
- Language: English

Soon after this, Lightening has a litter of puppies, and to protect them from bears, takes them to the farm, where the boy's father finds them, and attempts to kill them, via putting them in a sack and tossing them in the river. Lightening finds him doing such, and saves the puppies from the river, angering the man even more, so much for him to go after Lighetning with a shot gun into the forest, where he steps on a bear trap he had left out earlier for Lightening, and then get attacked by a bear, being saved by Lighetning, and finally coming around to the dog, seeing him as another member of the household.
