= Romance of the Redwoods (1939 film) =

1939 film by Charles Vidor

- Directed by: Charles Vidor
- Screenplay by: Michael L. Simmons; Jack London
- Based on: The White Silence by Jack London
- Produced by: Wallace MacDonald
- Starring: Charles Bickford; Jean Parker; Gordon Oliver
- Cinematography: Allen G. Siegler
- Edited by: Byron Robinson
- Color process: Black and white
- Production company: Columbia Pictures
- Distributed by: Columbia Pictures
- Release date: March 30, 1939
- Running time: 61 minutes
- Country: United States
- Language: English

Romance of the Redwoods is a 1939 American adventure film directed by Charles Vidor and starring Charles Bickford, Jean Parker and Gordon Oliver. It is based on the 1899 short story The White Silence by Jack London.

== Plot ==
June Martin is a dishwasher in a California logging camp boarding house. Steve Blake fights Jed Malone for her and loses, thus casting suspicion on himself when Malone dies under cloudy circumstances.

== Cast ==
- Charles Bickford as Steve Blake
- Jean Parker as June Martin
- Al Bridge as Boss Whittaker
- Gordon Oliver as Jed Malone
- Ann Shoemaker as Mother Manning
- Lloyd Hughes as Eddie Carter
- Pat O'Malley as Yerkes
- Marc Lawrence as Joe
- Earl Gunn as Socko
- Don Beddoe as Forbes
- Erville Alderson as Jackson
- Lee Prather as Judge Hanley

== See also ==
- List of American films of 1939
