= Jean Muir (actress) =

American stage and film actress (1911–1996)

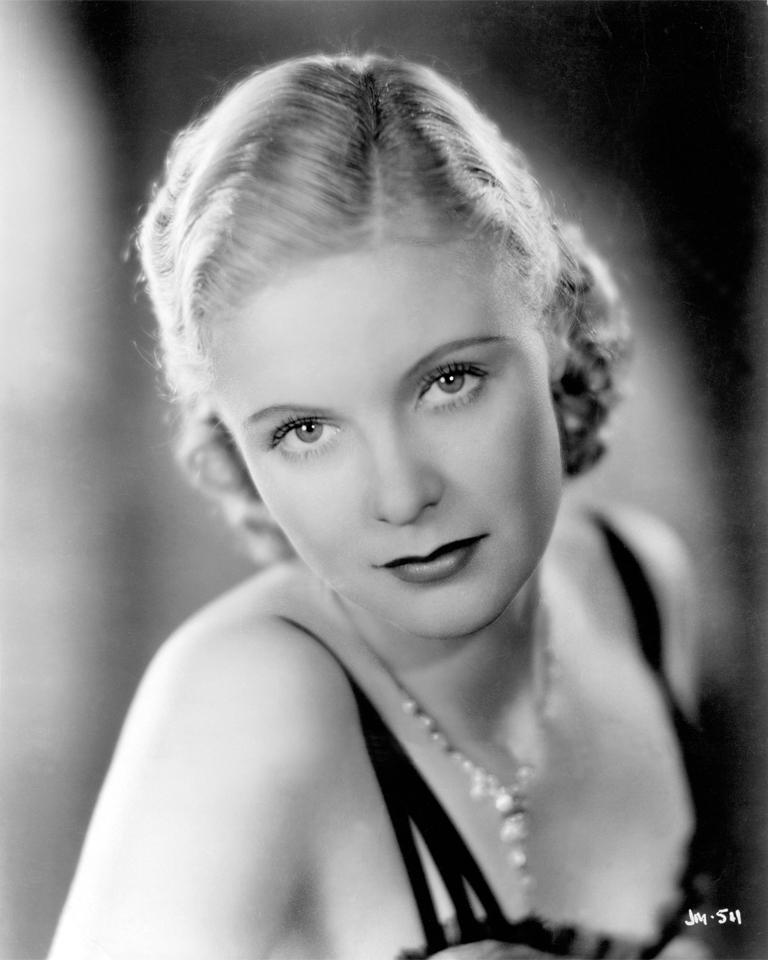
- Warner Bros. publicity portrait of Muir
- Born: Jean Muir Fullarton; February 13, 1911; Suffern, New York, U.S.
- Died: July 23, 1996 (aged 85); Mesa, Arizona, U.S.
- Years active: 1930–1950, 1958–1962
- Spouse: Henry Jaffe (m. 1940; div. 1960)
- Children: 3, including Michael Jaffe

Jean Muir (born Jean Muir Fullarton; February 13, 1911 – July 23, 1996) was an American stage and film actress. She was the first performer to be blacklisted after her name appeared in the anti-Communist pamphlet Red Channels, published in 1950. In her later years, she was a college drama teacher.

== Early years ==
An only child, Muir was born in Suffern, New York. Her father was a certified public accountant, and her mother was a substitute teacher. Jean attended the Dwight School in Englewood, New Jersey. After graduating, she visited France and briefly studied French at the Sorbonne University in Paris.

== Career ==
Muir went to New York City to become an actress. She landed a job as a model for the Walter Thornton Model Agency. At age 19, she made her Broadway debut in The Truth Game (1930). She was using the stage name "Jean Fullarton". She went on to act in other plays including Peter Ibbetson, Life Begins, and Saint Wench. The latter production folded after a week; however, a theatrical agent saw it and encouraged Muir to try her luck in Hollywood. She recorded a screen test, and the agent showed it to Warner Bros. which promptly signed her to a contract in 1933. She then worked steadily in supporting and co-starring roles, appearing in 14 films over the next three years. She played opposite many notable actors such as Paul Muni, Richard Barthelmess, Franchot Tone, Joe E. Brown, and Warren William.

However, it wasn't long before Muir's assertiveness and nonconformity incurred the disfavor of Warner Bros., for instance, she resisted posing for publicity photographs, and she refused to wear makeup or dress stylishly in public. The studio executives were also unhappy with her political activism, "offering financial support to striking lettuce workers in California's Imperial Valley and signing on as an early member of the newly formed Screen Actors Guild (SAG).... Muir marched in the union's first Labor Day parade, held organizing meetings at her home, and made phone calls to secure picketers ahead of the union's first possible strike."

But perhaps what most annoyed Muir's employers was her tendency to ask too many questions, as her biographer Martha Fischer notes:

This new girl immediately made a nuisance of herself around the studio, strolling onto soundstages and interrogating everyone from electricians to lighting directors about their work. In Muir's own telling, she quickly earned the nickname "the studio pest," believing no one too important to be questioned, and never doubting her right to ask. And the questions never stopped. When she was cast in films, Muir questioned her directors, seeking explanations for their orders rather than simply doing as she was told.

One director commented, "That Muir girl drives me crazy. I could cheerfully drown her, but I want her in my next picture." Her behavior led to multiple suspensions by Warner Bros. until finally in 1937, the studio terminated her contract. A Billboard news item at the time said that Muir "had talked herself out of the picture industry".

She packed up her car and drove back to New York to work again in theater. She eventually returned to Hollywood for a few more films, the last being The Constant Nymph (1943), acting alongside Joan Fontaine. Muir was a candidate for the role of Melanie in Gone with the Wind (1939).

In the late 1930s and early '40s, Muir continued her political activism. She helped organize the American Guild of Variety Artists in 1939. She spoke out against racism in Hollywood. She appeared at public events around the country with figures such as Eleanor Roosevelt, Fiorello La Guardia, and Fredi Washington to advocate for political reform and civil rights.

By 1943, Muir mostly took a break from film and theater acting. Although she obtained two short-lived Broadway jobs in the ensuing years—including a role in Tenting Tonight in 1947—she concentrated on raising her three children. She was lured back to the profession in 1949 to play the role of "Mother Aldrich" in the TV sitcom The Aldrich Family, which was being transferred to the small screen from the popular radio program.

== Blacklist ==
In 1950, Muir was named as a Communist sympathizer by the notorious pamphlet Red Channels. She was summarily dropped from The Aldrich Family cast. NBC claimed it had received over twenty phone calls protesting her presence on the show. The sponsor, General Foods, said it would not sponsor any programs in which "controversial persons" were featured. Despite receiving more than three thousand letters asking Muir to be reinstated, NBC did not reverse the decision. Muir had the dubious distinction of being the first performer deprived of employment because of a listing in Red Channels. The apparent reason for the listing was that she once held a six-month membership in the Congress of American Women, which federal authorities had labeled a subversive group.

In an attempt to remove herself from the blacklist, Muir volunteered to appear before the House Un-American Activities Committee (HUAC). In her testimony on June 15, 1953, she denied ever being a Communist, but she did not deny that she previously supported organizations deemed subversive. Although she chose to be fully cooperative with the committee, it was not enough to satisfy them. Martha Fischer writes:

Afterward, she instantly regretted her choice, not because there was no clearance forthcoming – though there wasn't – but rather because it made her feel like "a craven turncoat against all my principles." This betrayal of everything she believed and stood for was so traumatic that, looking over her testimony with an interviewer twenty years later, Muir was stunned to discover that she had named names. She had completely erased this detail from her memory.

Her testimony was followed by several years of a downward spiral in which she drank heavily and became estranged from her husband and children.

== Later years ==
After the blacklist finally eased for Muir, she resumed television acting in 1958 when she landed a role in an episode of Matinee Theater. She earned other guest spots on The Witness, Route 66, and Naked City. In 1960 she appeared opposite Ed Begley in a brief Broadway run of Semi-Detached, but by 1962 her acting career was over.

She then embarked on a second career as a drama teacher. She taught and directed plays at two New York community centers. In 1968 she moved to Missouri and became the Master Acting Teacher at Stephens College, and also directed multiple productions. She completed her own college degree at Stephens in 1977. Reaching the school's mandatory retirement age forced her to stop teaching there. In 1981 she had a one-year appointment as drama teacher at the University of Missouri–Kansas City.

== Personal life ==
On December 20, 1940, Muir married entertainment attorney, and later television producer, Henry Jaffe in New York. They had three children before getting divorced in 1960. In the mid-1950s, she reportedly suffered from alcoholism and cirrhosis of the liver.

== Death ==
Muir died in a nursing home in Mesa, Arizona, on July 23, 1996, at the age of 85.

== Recognition ==
Jean Muir has a star on the Hollywood Walk of Fame at 6280 Hollywood Blvd.

== Filmography ==
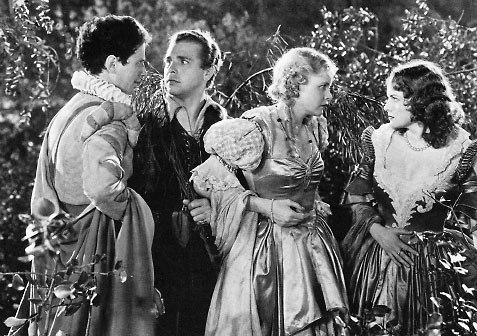
Ross Alexander, Dick Powell, Jean Muir and Olivia de Havilland in A Midsummer Night's Dream (1935)

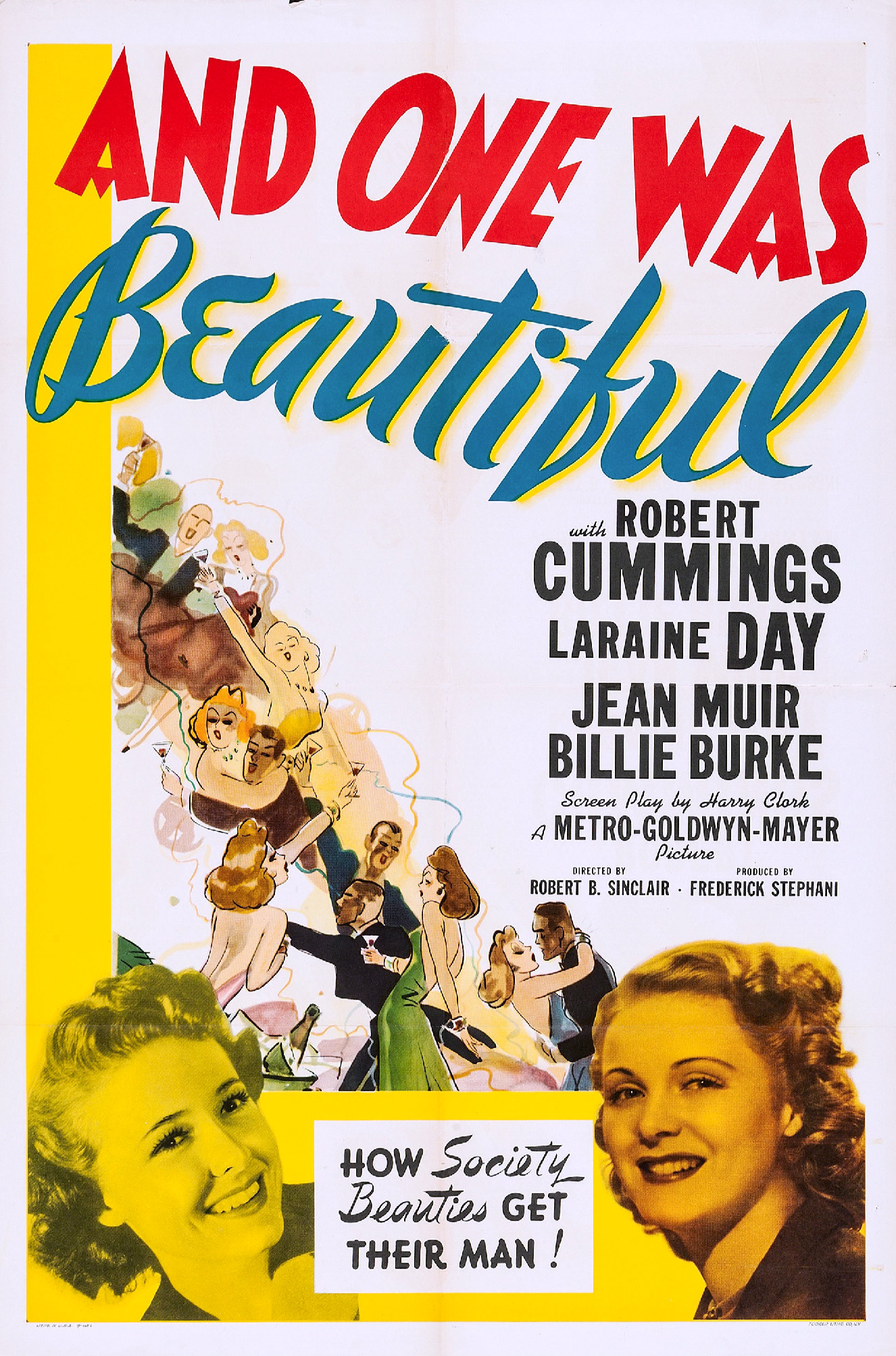
And One Was Beautiful (1940)

=== Film ===
Year	Title	Role	Notes
1933	Bureau of Missing Persons	Louise Kane	Uncredited
1933	Female	Miss Joyce	Uncredited
1933	The World Changes	Selma Peterson, her granddaughter Selma	
1933	Son of a Sailor	Helen Farnsworth	
1934	Bedside	Caroline Grant	
1934	As the Earth Turns	Jen Shaw	
1934	A Modern Hero	Joanna Ryan Croy	
1934	Dr. Monica	Mary Hathaway	
1934	Desirable	Lois Johnson	
1934	Gentlemen are Born	Trudy Talbot	
1935	The White Cockatoo	Sue Talley	
1935	Oil for the Lamps of China	Alice	
1935	Orchids to You	Camillia Rand	
1935	A Midsummer Night's Dream	Helena	
1935	Stars Over Broadway	Nora Wyman	
1936	Faithful	Marilyn Koster	Warner Bros.-First National Teddington; lost film
1936	White Fang	Sylvia Burgess	
1936	Fugitive in the Sky	Rita Moore	
1937	Once a Doctor	Paula Nordland	
1937	Her Husband's Secretary	Carol Blane Kingdon	
1937	The Outcasts of Poker Flat	Miss Helen Colby	
1937	Draegerman Courage	Ellen Haslett	
1937	Dance Charlie Dance	Mary Mathews	
1937	White Bondage	Betsy Ann Craig	
1938	Jane Steps Out	Beatrice Wilton	
1940	And One Was Beautiful	Helen Lattimer	
1940	The Lone Wolf Meets a Lady	Joan Bradley	
1943	The Constant Nymph	Kate Sanger	

=== Television ===
Year	Title	Episode(s)	Role
1949	Starring Boris Karloff	"False Face"	
1949	Actors Studio	"A Child Is Born"	Clarissa
1949	The Aldrich Family	"Episode #1"	Mother Aldrich
1950	The Philco Television Playhouse	"The Sudden Guest"	
1958	Matinee Theater	"The Story of Marcia Gordon"	
1959	Naked City	"Hey, Teach!"	Mrs. Kling
1960	The Witness	"Jack 'Legs' Diamond"	Mrs. Clinton
1961	Route 66	"A Bridge Across Five Days"	Beatrice Ware
1962	Naked City	"The One Marked Hot Gives Cold"	Mrs. Lund
