= Gordon Oliver =

American actor (1910–1995)

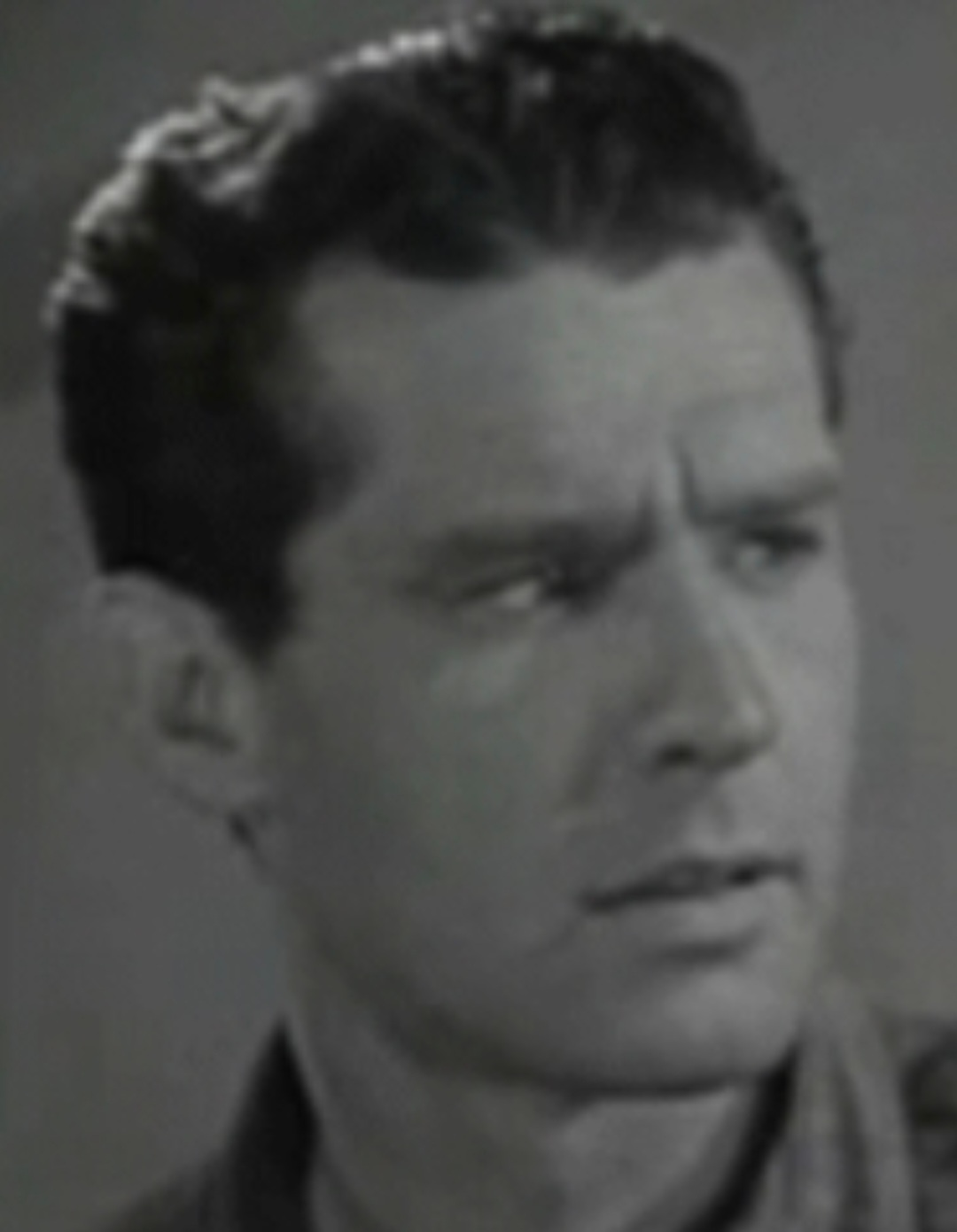
- Oliver in Youth on Parole (1937)
- Born: April 27, 1910; Los Angeles, California, U.S.
- Died: January 26, 1995 (aged 84); Los Angeles, California, U.S.
- Resting place: Hollywood Forever Cemetery
- Occupations: Actor; film producer
- Years active: 1933–1972
- Spouse: Elsa Oliver (m. 1949)
- Children: 2

Gordon Oliver (April 27, 1910 – January 26, 1995) was an American actor and film producer. He appeared in more than 40 films and television shows between 1933 and 1972.

== Biography ==
Oliver began working in films in 1936, eventually working for Warner Bros., Columbia and RKO. He went on to appear in approximately 25 films. Oliver was executive producer of It Takes a Thief, Peter Gunn, Mr. Lucky, and Mr. Adams and Eve. On-screen, he was co-host of Mobil Theatre and Douglas Fairbanks, Jr., Presents.

Oliver was married to model Elsa Oliver for 46 years. They had a son, Angus Duncan, and a daughter, Elsa Lambert. He died of emphysema January 26, 1995, at Cedars-Sinai Medical Center in Los Angeles, California. He was interred at Hollywood Forever Cemetery. Oliver was survived by his wife, a son, and a daughter.

== Partial filmography ==
As actor, unless otherwise noted.

- The Sweetheart of Sigma Chi (1933) - Student (uncredited)
- Fugitive in the Sky (1936) - Bob White
- Once a Doctor (1937) - Dr. Jerry Brace
- Draegerman Courage (1937) - Pete Lawson
- The Go Getter (1937) - Luce
- San Quentin (1937) - Captain
- The Case of the Stuttering Bishop (1937) - Philip Brownley
- Fly-Away Baby (1937) - Lucien 'Sonny' Croy
- White Bondage (1937) - Dave Graydon
- Youth on Parole (1937) - Phillip Henderson
- Alcatraz Island (1937) - George Drake
- Over the Goal (1937) - Benton
- West of Shanghai (1937) - Jim Hallet
- Expensive Husbands (1937) - Ricky Preston
- Daredevil Drivers (1938) - Mark Banning
- Jezebel (1938) - Dick Allen
- Women Are Like That (1938) - Howard Johns
- The Marines Are Here (1938) - Corporal Dick Jones
- Brother Rat (1938) - Capt 'Lacedrawers' Rogers
- Blondie (1938) - Chester Franey
- There's That Woman Again (1938) - Charles Crenshaw
- Pride of the Navy (1939) - Jerry Richards
- My Son Is a Criminal (1939) - Allen Coltrin
- Romance of the Redwoods (1939) - Jed Malone
- A Woman Is the Judge (1939) - Robert Langley
- Sabotage (1939) - Tommy Grayson
- Sweetheart of the Campus (1941) - Terry Jones
- Follies Girl (1943) - Pvt. Jerry Hamlin
- Passport to Destiny (1944) - Capt. Franz von Weber
- Seven Days Ashore (1944) - Dan Arland Jr.
- Since You Went Away (1944) - Marine Officer Seeking Room
- Heavenly Days (1944) - Dick Martin
- The Spiral Staircase (1946) - Steve Warren
- Station West (1948) - Prince
- Born to Be Bad (1950) - The Lawyer
- My Forbidden Past (1951) - Clay Duchesne
- The Las Vegas Story (1952) - Mr. Drucker
- Code Name: Heraclitus (1967, producer)
- Cancel My Reservation (1972) - Mr. Willie Sparker

== Radio appearances ==
| Year | Program | Episode/source |
|---|---|---|
| 1952 | Family Theater | Pas de Deux |
