= Gentlemen Are Born (1934 film) =

1934 film

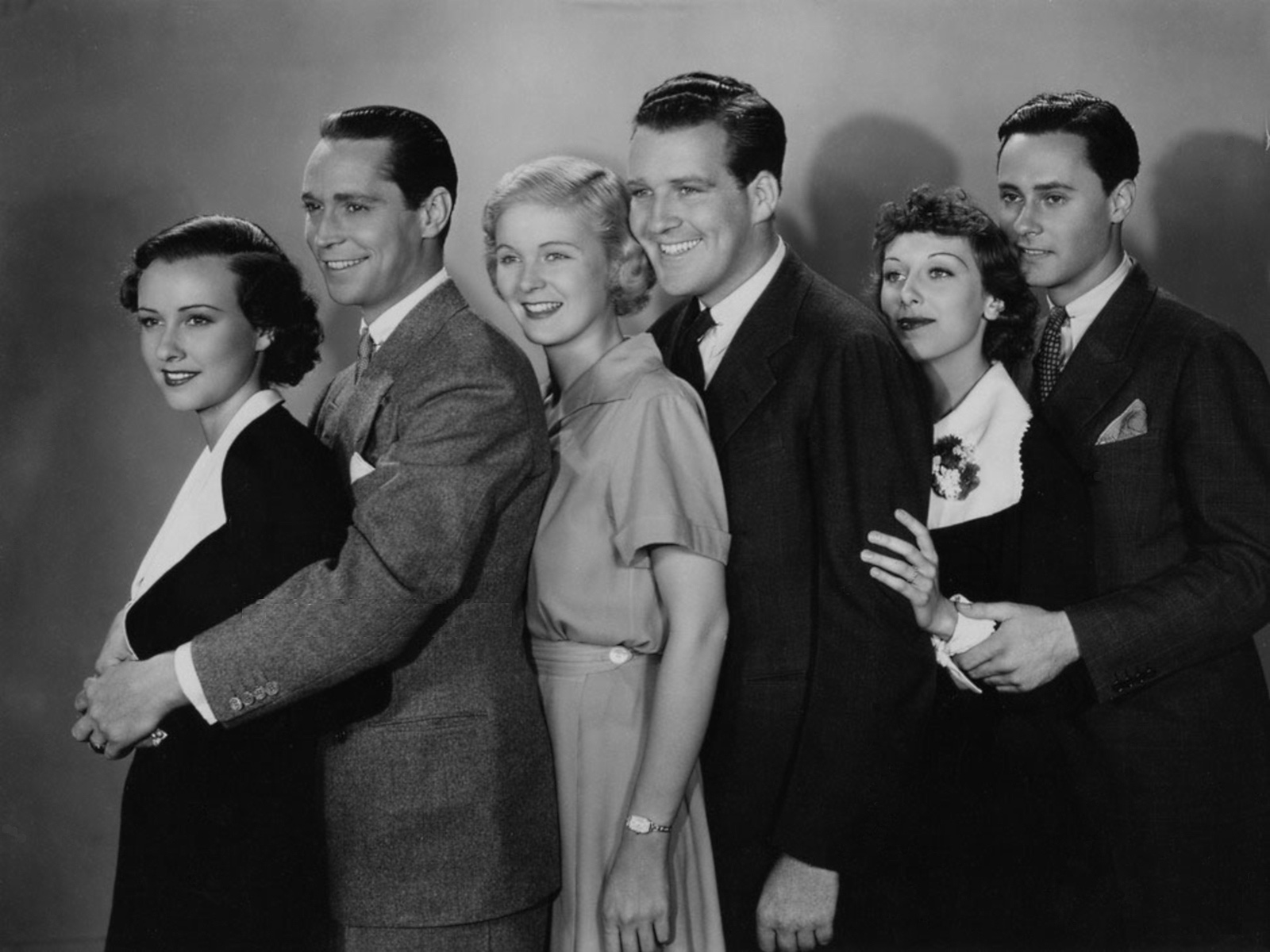
- L-R: Margaret Lindsay, Franchot Tone, Jean Muir, Dick Foran, Ann Dvorak & Robert Light
- Directed by: Alfred E. Green
- Written by: Robert Lee Johnson; Eugene Solow
- Produced by: Edward Chodorov
- Starring: Franchot Tone; Jean Muir; Margaret Lindsay
- Cinematography: James Van Trees
- Edited by: Herbert I. Leeds
- Music by: Heinz Roemheld
- Production company: Warner Bros. Pictures
- Distributed by: Warner Bros. Pictures
- Release date: November 17, 1934
- Running time: 75 minutes
- Country: United States
- Language: English

Gentlemen Are Born is a 1934 American drama film directed by Alfred E. Green and starring Franchot Tone, Jean Muir and Margaret Lindsay. The film's pre-release title was Just Out of College. A news item in Daily Variety notes that Warner Bros. Pictures was sued for $250,000 by Ronald Wagoner and James F. Wickizer who contended that the film was based on their story "Yesterday's Heroes."

== Plot ==
Four friends, Bob Bailey, Tom Martin, Smudge Casey, and Fred Harper, are certain that upon their graduation from college, they will conquer the world. They face disappointment when they look for jobs, however. Because of the Depression, jobs are scarce and each one has many applicants.

Fred goes to work for his father, Mr. Harper, a prominent stockbroker. Eventually Bob, who intends to become a journalist, manages to sell occasional articles to the newspaper, and Tom also finds work. Smudge, a star athlete, unsuccessfully looks for work as a coach. Tom is in love with Trudy Talbot, who moves to New York to be near him. She shares a room with Susan Merrill, a librarian. Tom invites Bob to double date with him and Trudy, hoping that he will become interested in Susan, but Bob is in love with Fred's sister Joan Harper, even though they are of different social classes. When Bob attends a boxing match on assignment from the paper, he sees Smudge fighting for a few dollars.

Realizing that Smudge is broke, Susan and Bob invite him for Sunday breakfast. Soon Susan and Smudge fall in love. Shortly after, Tom and Trudy marry, as do Susan and Smudge. Joan and Bob date despite her mother's wishes that she only go out with men of her class. Smudge is fired from his job as a truck driver because there is not enough work and Susan loses her job because she is married. Meanwhile, Tom and Trudy have a baby. Mr. Harper is implicated in a trust failure and kills himself, leaving his family in reduced circumstances. To ensure the financial security of her family, Joan decides to sacrifice her own happiness and set her love for Bob aside to instead accept a proposal from wealthy Stephen Hornblow.

Completely desperate, Smudge impulsively robs a pawnshop of ten dollars in order to buy food and he is shot running away. Smudge dies, but Bob at least manages to keep his identity out of the papers; Susan returns to her parents. When Joan meets Bob at Tom and Trudy's, where they have gone to visit the new baby, she tells him that she has changed her mind about Stephen's proposal since she knows he won't make her happy. Rather than worry about her family, she will follow her heart and marry Bob.

== Cast ==
- Franchot Tone as Bob Bailey
- Jean Muir as Trudy Talbot
- Margaret Lindsay as Joan Harper
- Ann Dvorak as Susan Merrill
- Ross Alexander as Tom Martin
- Dick Foran as Smudge Casey
- Charles Starrett as Stephen Hornblow
- Russell Hicks as Editor
- Robert Light as Fred Harper
- Addison Richards as Martinson
- Henry O'Neill as Mr. Harper
- Arthur Aylesworth as Mr. Gillespie
- Marjorie Gateson as Mrs. Harper
- Bradley Page as Al
- Edward Mosbar as Tom Texas
- Virginia Howell as Miss Graham
- James Burtis as Moe
