= White Bondage =

1937 American drama film directed by Nick Grinde

- Directed by: Nick Grinde
- Screenplay by: Anthony Coldeway
- Produced by: Bryan Foy
- Starring: Jean Muir; Gordon Oliver; Howard Phillips; Joe King; Harry Davenport; Virginia Brissac
- Cinematography: L. William O'Connell
- Edited by: Frank DeWar
- Music by: Clifford Vaughan
- Production company: Warner Bros. Pictures
- Distributed by: Warner Bros. Pictures
- Release date: August 5, 1937
- Running time: 60 minutes
- Country: United States
- Language: English

White Bondage is a 1937 American drama film directed by Nick Grinde and written by Anthony Coldeway. The film stars Jean Muir, Gordon Oliver, Howard Phillips, Joe King, Harry Davenport and Virginia Brissac. The film was released by Warner Bros. Pictures on August 5, 1937.

== Plot ==
Newspaper reporter Dave Graydon masquerades as a traveling "fix anything" repair man to infiltrate the organization of corrupt cotton gin and store owner Trent Talcott who cheats local sharecroppers. After false assault charges and an escape from a lynch mob, Graydon exposes Talcott's schemes and the "croppers" receive compensation.

== Cast ==
- Jean Muir as Betsy Ann Craig
- Gordon Oliver as Dave Graydon
- Howard Phillips as Cal 'Snipe' Sanders
- Joe King as Trent Talcott
- Harry Davenport as Pop Craig
- Virginia Brissac as Sarah Talcott
- Addison Richards as Kip Gillis
- Eddie "Rochester" Anderson as Old Glory (uncredited)

== Critical reception ==
Variety wrote that Warner Bros. had a reputation for making films that dealt with sociological issues in a topical manner, but has this time missed an opportunity by failing to focus the film as "a saga of sharecroppers in the South." The reviewer contended that "after a promising start" the film made a "detour from the real subject" and became a standard action melodrama. It commended the acting of Joseph King, Virginia Brissac and Howard Philips, lamented the decision to darken Jean Muir's hair color, and stated that Gordon Oliver's performance was "no more than fair."
