= Once a Doctor =

1937 film by William Clemens

- Directed by: William Clemens
- Screenplay by: Robertson White; Ben Grauman Kohn
- Story by: Frank T. Daugherty; Paul Perez
- Produced by: Jack L. Warner; Hal B. Wallis
- Starring: Jean Muir; Donald Woods; Gordon Oliver; Joe King; Henry Kolker; Gordon Hart
- Cinematography: L. William O'Connell
- Edited by: Clarence Kolster
- Music by: Heinz Roemheld
- Production company: Warner Bros. Pictures
- Distributed by: Warner Bros. Pictures
- Release date: January 23, 1937
- Running time: 57 minutes
- Country: United States
- Language: English

Once a Doctor is a 1937 American drama film directed by William Clemens and written by Robertson White and Ben Grauman Kohn. The film stars Jean Muir, Donald Woods, Gordon Oliver, Joe King, Henry Kolker and Gordon Hart. The film was released by Warner Bros. Pictures on January 23, 1937.

== Plot ==
Excerpts from the Hippocratic Oath appear before the title card.

Jerry Brace, an irresponsible alcoholic, and his foster brother, Steven, are physicians, as is their father, Dr. Frank Brace. They work at the same hospital as eminent brain surgeon Dr. Bruce Nordland, a family friend. Both brothers are in love with Paula Nordland. Deeply grateful to Dr. Brace, Steven frequently covers for Jerry.

Although he is supposed to be on duty, Jerry takes nurse Ruby Horton for a drunken ride and crashes. Afraid, Jerry takes her home. At the hospital, he begs Steven to go and save her. Jerry promises to sober up and order a dose of antitoxin for a patient. Steven finds that Ruby is already dead. Jerry never orders the shot and passes out. The man dies.

Steven describes the events to Dr. Brace and Dr. Adams, but refuses to name the doctor he helped. Warned of the consequences to his career and their relationship by Dr. Brace, Steven persuades Jerry to go back to the office and confess. To Steven's horror, Jerry lies, pretending to be shocked at the suggestions. He blames his brother, who is fired and barred from future medical practice. Nordland trusts Steven, but all he can do is offer him a position as a male nurse at a clinic Nordland operates in a poor neighborhood.

At the clinic, Dr. Lewis congratulates Steven on his fifth life-saving—but secret—surgery. They agree that all will be well until a patient dies. Just then, a child is injured in a street accident. Steven calls Dr. Brace to perform the necessary operation, a Nordland Decompression. Paula comes with him. Brace says it is too late, but Steven insists it is worth trying. His father threatens to call the police, and Paula says she will give up on him. The police arrive while the operation is underway.

Paula and Dr, Brace testify in court. The magistrate is inclined to wait, but word comes that the child has died. Steven is convicted of manslaughter. Dr. Brace washes his hands of him, and Jerry makes a play for Paula, saying that Steven was not fit to be a doctor and promising that he will give the profession and Paula the treatment they deserve.

A year later, Steven is paroled, remanded to Dr. Nordland's custody. Nordland says that an autopsy revealed that Steven's surgery on the child was indistinguishable from his own. Steven's ability to perform Nordland Decompressions makes him invaluable to medical science. He cannot practice in the United States, but Nordland has established a charity clinic in Cuba. Dr. Brace, Jerry and Paula sail to Havana on a private yacht the same day that Steven sails on the SS Orlando, a Cuban freighter whose ship's doctor is a friend of the Nordlands.

On the yacht, Paula and Dr. Brace are revolted by Jerry's drinking, and when Jerry tries to stop his father from throwing a bottle overboard during a storm, Dr. Brace falls. Still drunk, Jerry diagnoses a basal fracture. He wants to operate. The yacht's radio distress call picks up the Orlando. Despite the storm, the vessels proceed to a rendezvous, but there is no way to get Steven to the yacht by boat. Steven proposes a breeches buoy. Captain Littlejohn refuses responsibility for Steven's life, but fires a line. As the Captain predicted, Steven is underwater for much of the trip, but he makes it just as Jerry is preparing to operate. Paula hides when she hears Steven's voice, and crewmen muscle Jerry out of the cabin.

When he sees who the patient is, Steven turns to leave. Paula stops him. He lists the many wrongs he has experienced, and Paula replies with the Hippocratic oath. He asks her to administer the anesthetic.

In a Havana hotel, Nordland interrupts Steven and Paula. He is going to introduce Steven to the board as the superintendent of his clinic. Dr Brace asks to see them. He has a telegram from Jerry. In “the first decent act of his life.” Jerry has confessed. He is going away for good.

Steven agrees to keep Dr. Brace's name and undertakes to share it with Paula. They kiss.

== Cast ==
- Jean Muir as Nurse Paula Nordland
- Donald Woods as Dr. Steven Brace
- Gordon Oliver as Dr. Jerry Brace
- Joe King as Dr. Frank Brace, Jerry's father and Steven's foster father
- Henry Kolker as Dr. Bruce Nordland, brain surgeon
- Gordon Hart as Dr. Harry Lewis, head of Nordland's inner city clinic
- Joseph Crehan as Captain Andrews
- Louise Stanley as Nurse Ruby Norton
- Robert Paige as Dr. Burton
- Edwin Stanley as Dr. Adams, Hospital administrator
- Houseley Stevenson as Magistrate Kendrick
- Harland Tucker as Prosecuting Attorney
- Guy Usher as Prison Warden
- Thomas Pogue as Dr. Artemus 'Doc' Dade, ship's doctor on the SS Orlando
- Edward Keane as Captain Littlejohn, S.S. Orlando, a Cuban freighter
