= The Silent Code =

- Poster for the film
- Directed by: Stuart Paton
- Written by: George Morgan
- Produced by: Louis Weiss
- Starring: Kane Richmond; Blanche Mehaffey
- Cinematography: Roland Price
- Edited by: Charles Craft
- Production companies: Weiss Productions, Inc.
- Distributed by: Stage and Screen Productions, Inc.
- Release date: November 1935 (US)
- Running time: 60 minutes
- Country: United States
- Language: English

The Silent Code is a 1935 American Western film written by George Morgan and directed by Stuart Paton. It was the third of a scheduled six films in the "Morton of the Mounties" series, although this would be the last one made. The first two, Courage of the North and Timber Terrors starred John Preston in the title role. This film saw Kane Richmond take over the lead, co-starring with Blanche Mehaffey.

Filming on the picture was completed in March 1935, and was originally scheduled to be released in mid-May. However, the release was delayed until November 1935. The Chicago Legion of Decency gave the film a Class A rating, meaning that it was suitable for the entire family.

The has been released on DVD by Oldies.com, paired with the film, Man's Best friend.

== Plot ==
When the Canadian Mountie Jerry Hale is sent to a remote outpost, he meets his old sweetheart, Helen Brent, who lives there with her uncle, Peter Barkley. Helen's father, Nathan, is off prospecting. As they renew their relationship, it becomes clear that the letters which Jerry has been sending to Helen have been intercepted and destroyed by Barkley. When her father returns from prospecting, he makes it known that he has a map to his gold strike. He moves into his cabin, but is killed by Lobo, one of Barkley's gang, who steals the map. During the attack, Lobo drops several Indian beads near Nathan's body. Barkley frames Jerry for the murder, and he is arrested and thrown in jail. While there, Helen visits him and vents her disgust with him, believing that he did kill her father.

The beads which Lobo dropped during the murder are eventually tracked back to him, after which Helen helps Jerry escape, and he rides off to get help from the Mounties. He tells Helen to wait in her father's cabin. While there, Barkley stops by and is confronted by Helen. The two begin to fight, Lobo watches, and kills Barkley with his knife. Jerry and the Mounties arrive and arrest Lobo and the rest of Barkley's gang, and Jerry is officially cleared. As all is well, Helen's dog Rex discovers that Nathan has hidden gold from his mining claim beneath the floor boards in his cabin.

== Cast ==
- Kane Richmond as Jerry Hale
- Blanche Mehaffey as Helen Brent
- Barney Furey as Peter Barkley
- Pat Harmon as Carney
- Ben Corbett as Breen
- Carl Mathews as Lobo
- Edward Coxen as Nathan Brent
- J. P. McGowan as Commissioner
- Joseph Girard as Inspector Manning
- Bud Osborne as Sergeant of Police
- Wolfgang as Rex, king of dogs
