= Attorney for the Defense =

1932 film

- Film poster
- Directed by: Irving Cummings
- Screenplay by: Jo Swerling
- Story by: James Kevin McGuinness
- Produced by: Harry Cohn
- Starring: Edmund Lowe; Evelyn Brent; Constance Cummings
- Cinematography: Ted Tetzlaff
- Edited by: Gene Havlick
- Production company: Columbia Pictures
- Distributed by: Columbia Pictures
- Release date: May 21, 1932
- Running time: 72 minutes
- Country: United States
- Language: English

Attorney for the Defense is a 1932 American pre-Code crime film directed by Irving Cummings and starring Edmund Lowe, Evelyn Brent, and Constance Cummings.

== Cast ==
- Edmund Lowe as William J. Burton
- Evelyn Brent as Val Lorraine
- Constance Cummings as Ruth Barry
- Don Dillaway as Paul Wallace
  - Douglas Haig as Paul Wallace as a Boy
- Dorothy Peterson as Mrs. Wallace
- Bradley Page as Nick Quinn a.k.a. Kramer
- Nat Pendleton as Mugg Malone
- Dwight Frye as James Wallace
- Wallis Clark as District Attorney James A. Crowell
- Clarence Muse as Jefferson Q. Leffingwell

== Reception ==
Variety said, "It's all pretty far-fetched and improbable, but sustained by good direction and able performances."
