= A Dog of Flanders (1935 film) =

1935 film directed by Edward Sloman

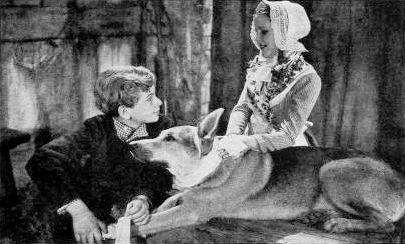
- Frankie Thomas, Helen Parrish and Lightning in A Dog of Flanders
- Directed by: Edward Sloman; Jimmy Anderson (assistant)
- Written by: Dorothy Yost (adaptation)
- Screenplay by: Ainsworth Morgan
- Based on: A Dog of Flanders; 1872 novel by Ouida
- Produced by: William Sistrom
- Starring: Frankie Thomas; O.P. Heggie
- Cinematography: J. Roy Hunt
- Edited by: George Crone
- Music by: Alberto Colombo (uncredited)
- Production company: RKO Radio Pictures
- Distributed by: RKO Radio Pictures
- Release date: March 22, 1935 (United States)
- Running time: 72 minutes
- Country: United States
- Language: English

A Dog of Flanders is a 1935 American drama film directed by Edward Sloman, based on a screenplay by Ainsworth Morgan from the story by Dorothy Yost, which she adapted from the 1872 novel of the same name by Ouida. The film stars Frankie Thomas, appearing in only his second film (the first being Wednesday's Child).

== Cast ==
- Frankie Thomas as Nello Daas
- Harry Beresford as Sacristan
- O. P. Heggie as Grandfather Jehan Daas
- DeWitt Jennings as Carl Cogez
- Lightning as "Leo", the dog
- Sarah Padden as Frau Keller
- Helen Parrish as Maria Cogez
- Richard Quine as Pieter Vanderkloot
- Frank Reicher as Herr Vanderkloot
- Addison Richards as Herr Herden
- Christian Rub as Hans
- Ann Shoemaker as Frau Ilse Cogez
- Nella Walker as Frau Vanderkloot

== Production ==
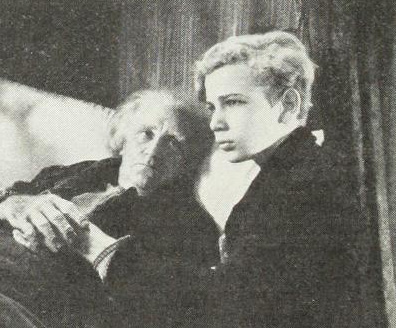
O. P. Heggie and Frankie Thomas

In November 1934 RKO announced that they would begin production on A Dog of Flanders the following month. It would be the third film adaptation, and the first sound production, of Ouida's 1872 novel, Dog of Flanders, which was, at the time, considered one of literature's "heroic love stories." By the end of November, Ainsworth Morgan had been assigned to develop the screenplay. At the beginning of December Frankie Thomas, a juvenile actor, had been cast in the film. Just prior to the commencement of filming, in late December, O. P. Heggie joined the cast, and shortly after it was announced that another child actor, Helen Parrish had been added to the acting personnel, while it was also revealed that Edward Sloman would handle the directing duties. Herman Pan was selected to handle the direction of the dance sequences, while William Sistrom was tapped to take care of the production duties. Production on the film had finished by the end of January, and the film was being edited in February. In the middle of February, RKO announced that A Dog of Flanders would open on March 22; and there were no changes to that date, the film opening on March 22, 1935.

== Reception ==
The Film Daily felt the film was a "pleasing human interest story nicely suited for the family", although they felt it might be at a disadvantage due to the lack of well-known actors in the cast. Harrison's Reports gave the film a good review, saying it was "wholesome," with "deep human appeal". They felt the production and direction were excellent, and they enjoyed the performances of the acting crew. They rated it as an excellent children's film. Motion Picture Daily gave the film a slightly less warm review, feeling that the picture was artistically satisfying due to its similarity in style to European films. Despite that slow pace, they applauded Edward Sloman's direction, and stated the "...film's beauty is simplicity abetted by touching performances and noteworthy direction done with a fine sense of feeling and understanding." The Motion Picture Herald said the picture was full of "... romance, drama, comedy, tragedy, deception and triumph ...," and thought it attempted to "... capture faithfully the spirit of the book and the story."
