= Fugitive in the Sky =

1936 film by Nick Grinde

- Theatrical release poster
- Directed by: Nick Grinde
- Screenplay by: George Bricker and story
- Produced by: Jack L. Warner; Hal B. Wallis; Bryan Foy
- Starring: Jean Muir; Warren Hull; Gordon Oliver
- Cinematography: Ted McCord, A.S.C.
- Edited by: Frank DeWar
- Music by: Howard Jackson
- Production company: Warner Bros. Pictures
- Distributed by: Warner Bros. Pictures
- Release date: November 28, 1936
- Running time: 58 minutes
- Country: United States
- Language: English

Fugitive in the Sky (aka Heroes of the Air) is a 1936 American aviation drama film directed by Nick Grinde and written by George Bricker. The stars are Jean Muir, Warren Hull, Gordon Oliver, Carlyle Moore Jr., Howard Phillips, Winifred Shaw and Mary Treen. Fugitive in the Sky was released by Warner Bros. Pictures on November 28, 1936, a mere six months after the Paramount Pictures feature, 13 Hours by Air, considered by aviation film historian Michael Paris in From the Wright Brothers to Top Gun: Aviation, Nationalism, and Popular Cinema (1995), as a virtual "remake" of the earlier film.

The Foreword at the end of opening credits stated: "The story portrayed in this production is fictitious, and is not intended to represent events which have taken place on a commercial air line ... Scheduled air transport, regulated by the Department of Commerce, is today recognized as a fast and safe form of transportation."

== Plot ==
In Los Angeles, air hostess Rita Moore chats with her suitor, reporter Terry Brewer, as passengers check in for a flight to New York. Brewer recognizes federal agent Mike Phelan traveling incognito. Guessing Phelan will be after "Killer" Madsen, wanted for murder, Brewer phones his editor for permission and boards the aircraft as well, to the annoyance of pilot Bob White, another suitor of Rita's. The Ford Trimotor now has a full load of 12 passengers.

At a stop in Albuquerque, passenger Katie Tristo, who generally talks about nothing but astrology, buys an Indian-made dagger from a souvenir stand. Between there and the next stop in Kansas City, most of the passengers are dozing when someone uses this dagger to kill another passenger, Ramon Duval.

When the crime is discovered, Phelan reveals his true identity and attempts to take charge, but instead a "female" passenger draws a gun, disarms and handcuffs Phelan, and hijacks the aircraft. He removes his disguise: he is "Killer" Madsen. After the radio transmitter is disabled, he throws the pilots' guns out the cockpit window, and orders them to fly to Evansville, Indiana. As they fly, Brewer interviews Madsen, who claims he never murdered anyone with a knife. If so, someone else must have committed this new murder.

Rita attempts to drug Madsen's coffee, but instead knocks out copilot Johnny Martin. A dust storm arises and all aircraft are ordered to land. Madsen makes White fly until the dust stops the engines, forcing an emergency landing in Missouri. Madsen leaves the aircraft, ordering the other passengers and crew to give him a 10-minute start, and commandeers an elderly couple's farmhouse nearby. The others find the same house and are again taken hostage.

Eventually Madsen orders White to repair the engines and resume the flight. Brewer goes along to help, and while Madsen is watching White, he manages to repair the radio and call police as well as filing his news story. The other hostages are afraid enough of Madsen to remain in the house, which has no phone.

As they pass the time viewing anaglyph 3D photos with a stereoscope, Rita realizes that Katie looks younger when seen through its red lens. Phelan then recognizes her as Katie Dorne, a second fugitive, disguised by red makeup. Rita finds a way to arm herself and goes to confront Madsen, but he uses Brewer as a shield and shoots White, wounding him. Brewer then manages to overpower Madsen.

Phelan arrives, recovers his handcuff key, puts the cuffs on Madsen, and also arrests Dorne for murdering Duval. They had stolen $90,000 worth of bonds together, and Phelan had been following Duval to catch them both. She killed Duval because he had taken all the bonds. Madsen's presence on the same flight was coincidental.

White now assists with a smile as Brewer proposes to Rita; the two board the aircraft and begin kissing.

== Cast ==
- Jean Muir as Rita Moore
- Warren Hull as Terry Brewer
- Gordon Oliver as Bob White
- Carlyle Moore Jr. as Johnny Martin
- Howard Phillips as "Killer" Madsen
- Winifred Shaw as Autumn Day
- Mary Treen as Agatha Ormsby
- with John Litel as Mike Phelan from Department of Justice
- Gordon Elliott as Ramon Duval, mustachioed passenger on the aircraft
- Nedda Harrigan as Katie Tristo, passenger, astrology follower and disguised criminal who kills Ramon Duval
- John Kelly as Kid Couch, dimwitted boxer traveling on the aircraft
- Joe Cunningham as Spike, Kid Couch's trainer on the aircraft with Kid Couch
- Don Barclay as Ronald DeWitt, drunken passenger on the aircraft
- Charles Foy as Steve Fanning, another passenger on the aircraft
- Spencer Charters as Henry Staeger, farmhouse owner who welcomes the aircraft passengers
- Lillian Harmer as Martha Staeger, Henry Staeger's wife
- Tom Jackson as Dave Brandon, city desk editor at Terry Brewer's newspaper

(Note: Unbilled (in order of appearance): Louise Stanley……...Alice, cashier at Los Angeles airport newsstand; Al Herman………Jimmy, attendant at Los Angeles airport; Ferdinand Schumann-Heink………attendant as aircraft lands at Albuquerque airport; Milton Kibbee………official at Kansas City airport; Dennis Moore………radio operator in St. Louis; Ralph Dunn………radio announcer with news about the grounded aircraft; Harry Fox………radio announcer with news about murder of an aircraft passenger; George Magrill………lawman who arrives by aircraft and greets Mike Phelan)

== Production ==
A pre-release title and "working title" of Fugitive in the Sky was Heroes of the Air.

The aircraft used in Fugitive in the Sky were:

- Ford Trimotor 4-ATB c/n 24, NC5578
- Stinson SM-8A c/n 4024, NC215W
- Fokker Super Universal

A studio mock-up of a Ford Trimotor's interior and cockpit was also used in Fugitive in the Sky.

== Reception ==
Film reviewer Frank S. Nugent, writing in The New York Times considered that Fugitive in the Sky was a "... fairly interesting, if incredible, action picture". He further noted, "Without so much as a 'stop us if you've heard this one before', the Warners are blandly repeating the story of Paramount's 13 Hours by Air under a new title, "Fugitive in the Sky," which claimed sanctuary at the Palace yesterday ..."

Aviation film historian James H. Farmer in Celluloid Wings: The Impact of Movies on Aviation (1984) characterized Fugitive in the Sky as a "rather bland second feature rerun of Paramount's Thirteen Hours by Air (1936). All of the elements are here; the wanted killer, an airliner load of unsuspecting passengers, and, of course, the ever-present, life-threatening storm. Predictable results."
