= Lightning (dog) =

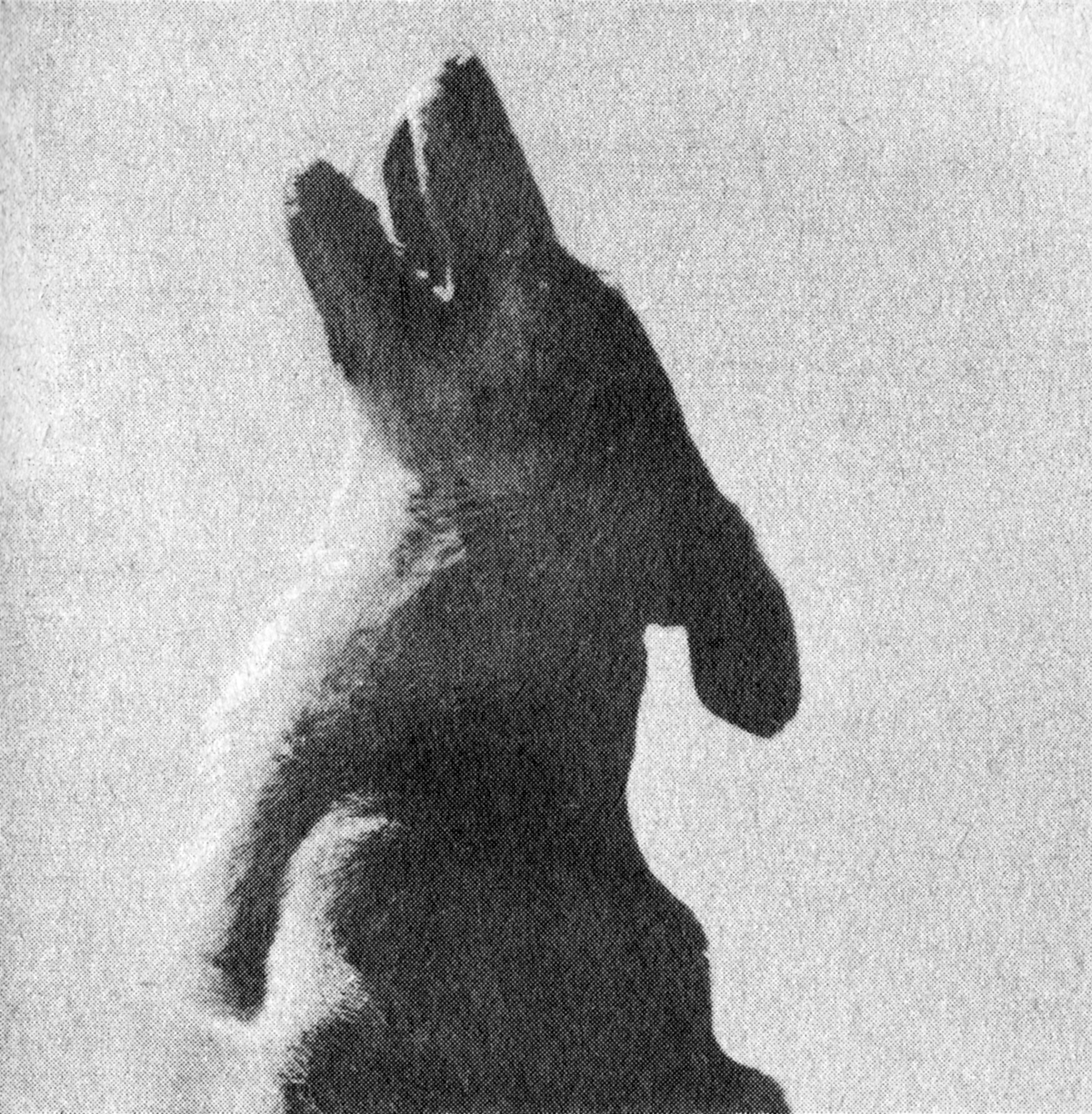
- Lightning in the Perry Mason film The Case of the Howling Dog (1934)
- Species: Canis lupus familiaris
- Breed: German Shepherd
- Sex: Male
- Born: United States
- Occupation: Actor
- Years active: 1934–1938
- Owner: Earl Johnson
- Parent: Strongheart (grandfather)

Lightning was a German Shepherd from a line of canine silent film stars. A grandson of Strongheart, Lightning was billed as "The Wonder Dog" and "The Marvel Dog". He began life as a runt but grew to be larger than average for the breed, and he was very intelligent. Lightning appeared in numerous movies.

== Select filmography ==
Year	Title	Notes
1934	The Case of the Howling Dog	
1934	When Lightning Strikes	
1935	A Dog of Flanders	
1935	Man's Best Friend	
1935	Wings in the Dark	
1936	White Fang	
1936	Two in Revolt	
1937	Renfrew of the Royal Mounted	
1938	Blind Alibi	

== Gallery ==
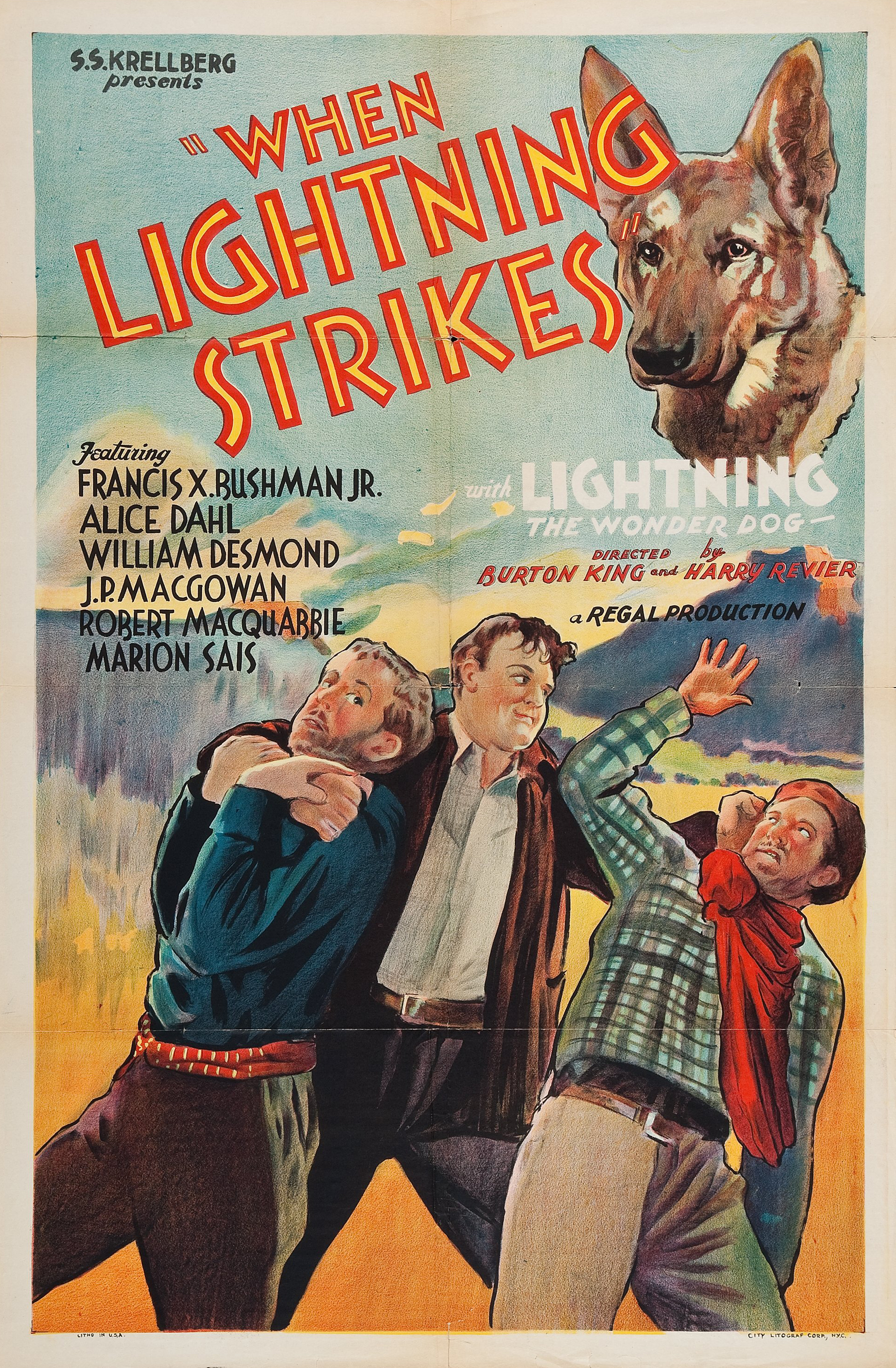
Poster for When Lightning Strikes (1934)

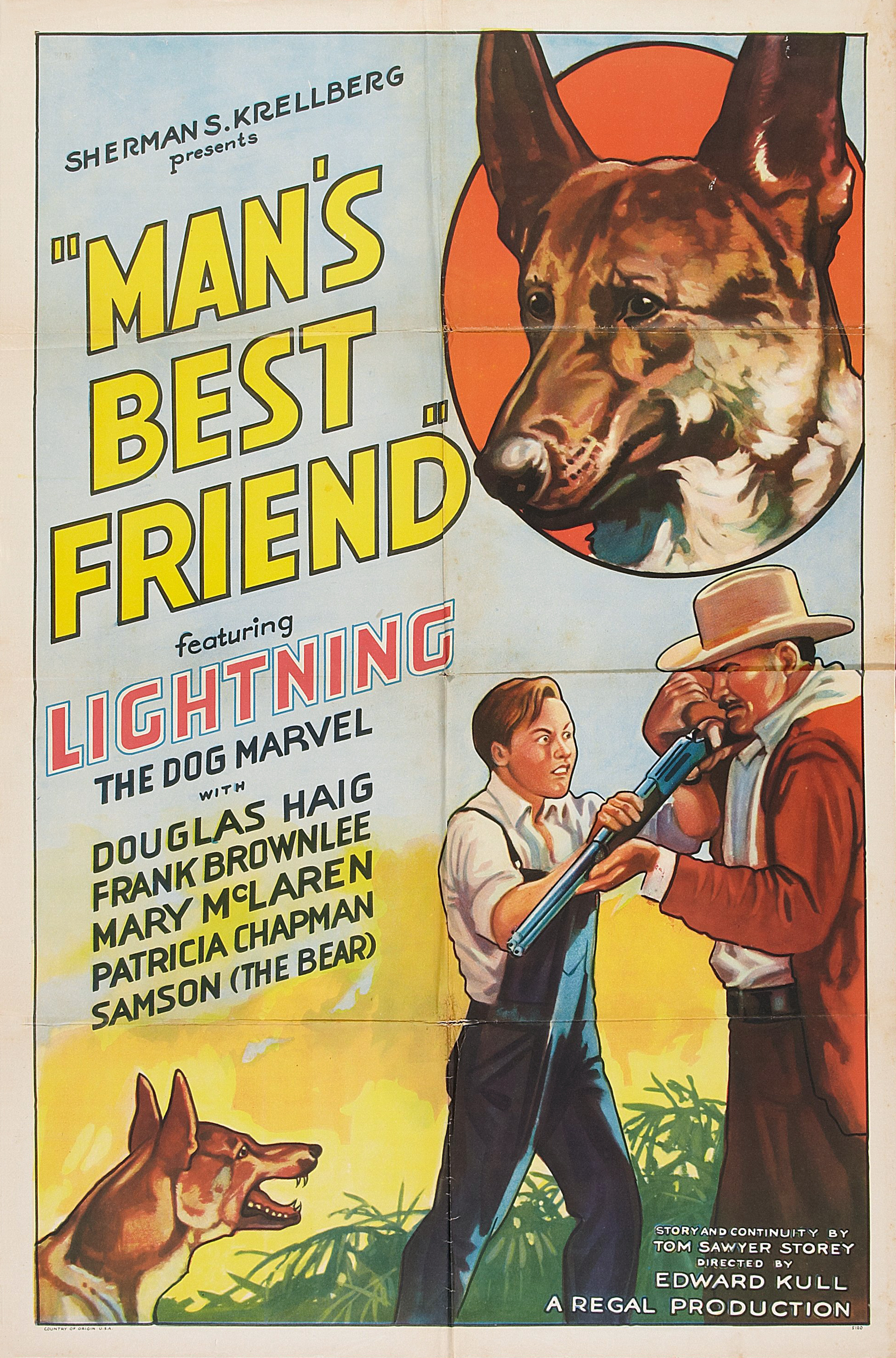
Poster for Man's Best Friend (1935)

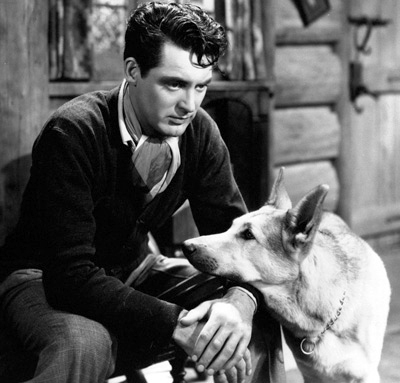
Cary Grant and Lightning in Wings in the Dark (1935)

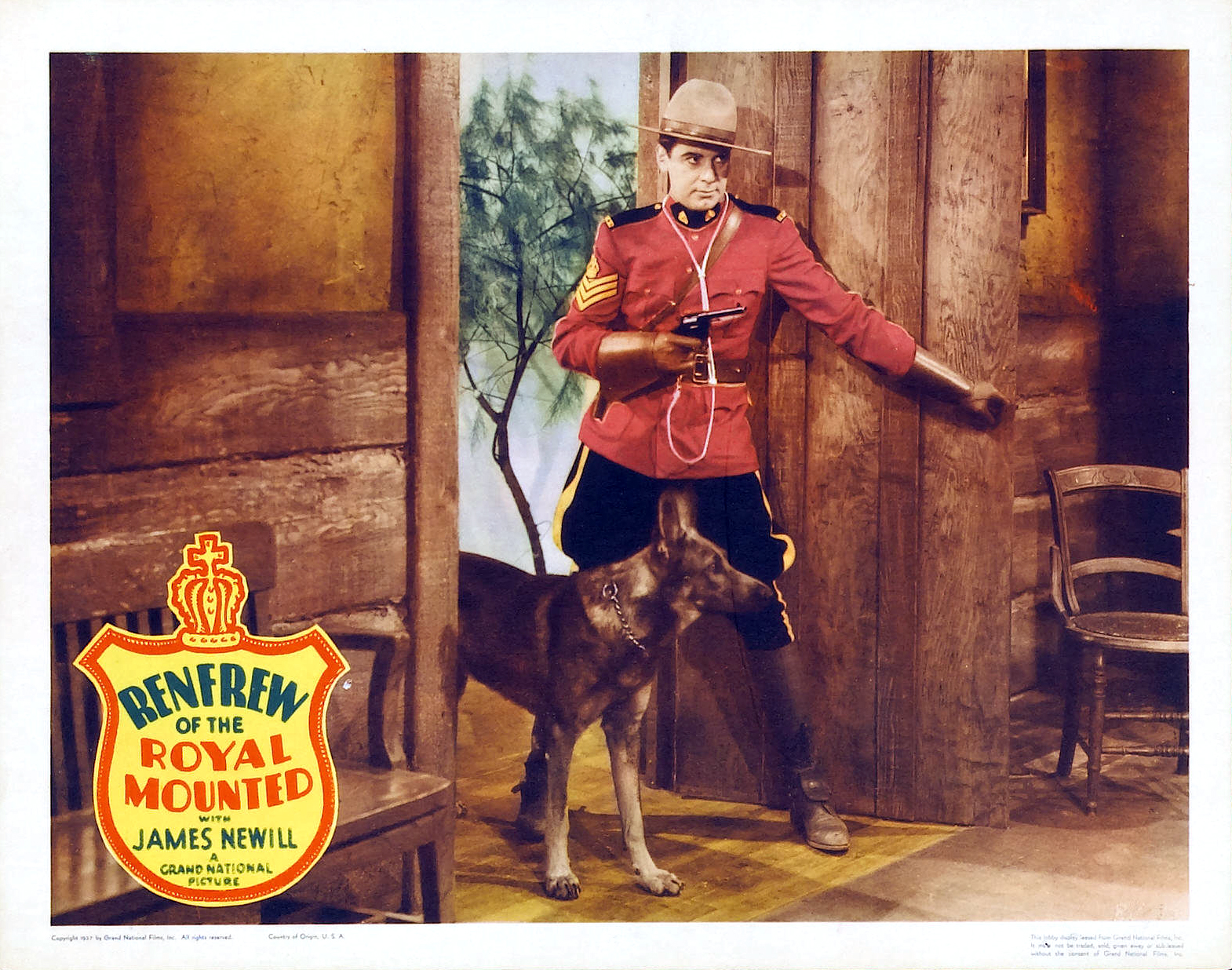
Lobby card for Renfrew of the Royal Mounted (1937)

== See also ==
- List of individual dogs
