= Dr. Monica =

1934 film

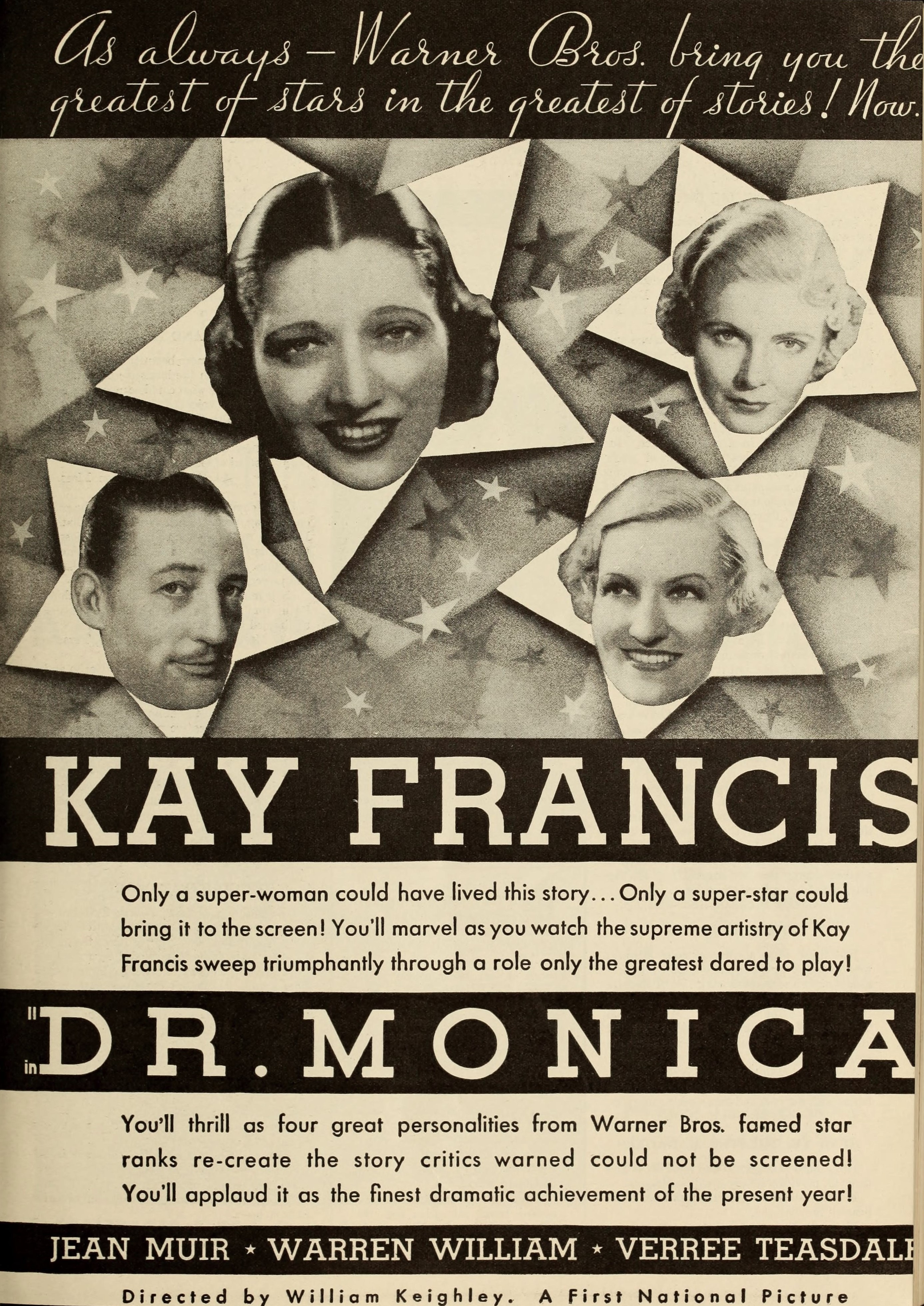
- Directed by: William Keighley; William Dieterle (uncredited)
- Written by: Charles Kenyon
- Based on: Sprawa Moniki, a Polish language play by Maria Morozowicz-Szczepkowska; Dr. Monica (1933 English adaptation) by Laura Walker Mayer
- Produced by: Henry Blanke (uncredited)
- Starring: Kay Francis; Warren William; Jean Muir
- Cinematography: Sol Polito
- Edited by: William Clemens
- Music by: Heinz Roemheld (uncredited)
- Production company: Warner Bros. Pictures
- Distributed by: Warner Bros. Pictures; Vitaphone Corp.
- Release dates: June 21, 1934 (NYC); June 23, 1934 (US)
- Running time: 65 minutes
- Country: United States
- Language: English

Dr. Monica is a 1934 American pre-Code melodrama film produced by Warner Bros. Pictures starring Kay Francis, Warren William, and Jean Muir. An obstetrician, who is unable to have children, discovers that the baby she is about to deliver was fathered by her husband.

== Plot ==
Mary Hathaway gives birth to a baby girl delivered by Dr. Monica Braden. Monica discovers her husband, John, is the child's father. John is unaware his affair with Mary resulted in her pregnancy. Monica prepares to leave John by telling him she is going abroad. Mary learns that Monica knows the truth and decides to leave the child in Monica's care. Mary, a pilot, flies her plane over the ocean, which is later reported to have vanished. When John asks Monica about the baby, Monica lies making John believe the baby was abandoned by both parents. In contemplating their new role, Monica looks at John and says "She's yours," while John unknowingly smiles.

== Cast ==
- Kay Francis as Dr. Monica Braden
- Warren William as John Braden
- Jean Muir as Mary Hathaway
- Verree Teasdale as Anna Littlefield
- Emma Dunn as Mrs. Monahan
- Phillip Reed as "Bunny" Burton
- Herbert Bunston as Mr. Pettinghill
- Ann Shoemaker as Mrs. Hazlitt
- Virginia Hammond as Mrs. Chandor
- Hale Hamilton as Dr. Brent

== Censorship ==
The censors at the Hays Office requested a large number of changes to the script before they would approve it for production. One of the major issues they had with the script was that it explicitly included dialogue about the potential dangers of childbirth.

== Reception ==
Mordaunt Hall, critic for The New York Times, wrote that Dr. Monica is "not especially suspenseful", but it "moves apace and the acting is excellent."
