= Two in Revolt =

1936 US film directed by Glenn Tryon

- Lobby card
- Directed by: Glenn Tryon
- Screenplay by: Ferdinand Reyher; Frank Howard Clark; Jerry Hutchison
- Story by: Earl Johnson; Thomas Storey
- Produced by: Samuel J. Briskin
- Starring: John Arledge; Louise Latimer; Moroni Olsen; Lightning the dog; Warrior the horse
- Cinematography: Jack MacKenzie
- Edited by: Fred Knudtson
- Music by: Alberto Colombo
- Production company: RKO Radio Pictures
- Release date: April 3, 1936 (US)
- Running time: 65 minutes
- Country: United States
- Language: English

Two in Revolt is a 1936 American drama film directed by Glenn Tryon. Released on April 3, 1936, by RKO Radio Pictures, the film stars John Arledge, Louise Latimer, and Moroni Olsen, and features Lightning the dog and Warrior the horse.

== Cast ==
- John Arledge as John Woods
- Louise Latimer as Gloria Benton
- Moroni Olsen as Cyrus Benton
- Harry Jans as Crane
- Willie Best as Eph
- Murray Alper as Andy
- Ethan Laidlaw as Bill Donlan
- Emmett Vogan as Mason
- Max Wagner as Davis
- Lightning the Dog as Himself
- Warrior the Horse as Himself

== Production ==
The working title for the film was Thoroughbreds All. Portions of the film were shot on location in the mountains near Sedona, Arizona. Dog trainer Earl Johnson wrapped his German Shepherd Lightning in four blankets at night, with just his nose exposed, when temperatures fell to 30 degrees below zero and water froze indoors.
