= Sabotage (1939 film) =

- Directed by: Harold Young
- Screenplay by: Lionel Houser; Alice Altschuler
- Story by: Lionel Houser; Alice Altschuler
- Produced by: Herman Schlom
- Starring: Arleen Whelan; Gordon Oliver; Charley Grapewin; Lucien Littlefield
- Cinematography: Reggie Lanning
- Edited by: William Morgan
- Music by: Cy Feuer; William Lava
- Production company: Republic Pictures
- Distributed by: Republic Pictures
- Release date: October 13, 1939
- Running time: 69 minutes
- Country: United States
- Language: English

Sabotage is a 1939 American action film directed by Harold Young and written by Lionel Houser and Alice Altschuler. The film stars Arleen Whelan, Gordon Oliver, Charley Grapewin and Lucien Littlefield. The film was released on October 13, 1939, by Republic Pictures.

== Cast ==
- Arleen Whelan as Gail
- Gordon Oliver as Tommy Grayson
- Charley Grapewin as Major Matt Grayson
- Lucien Littlefield as Eli
- Paul Guilfoyle as Steve Barsht
- J. M. Kerrigan as Mel
- Dorothy Peterson as Edith Grayson
- Don Douglas as Joe Grayson
- Joe Sawyer as Gardner
- Maude Eburne as Mrs. Hopkins
- Horace McMahon as Art Kruger
- Johnny Russell as Matt Grayson II
- Wade Boteler as Cop
- Frank Darien as Smitty
