= Youth on Parole =

1937 film by Phil Rosen

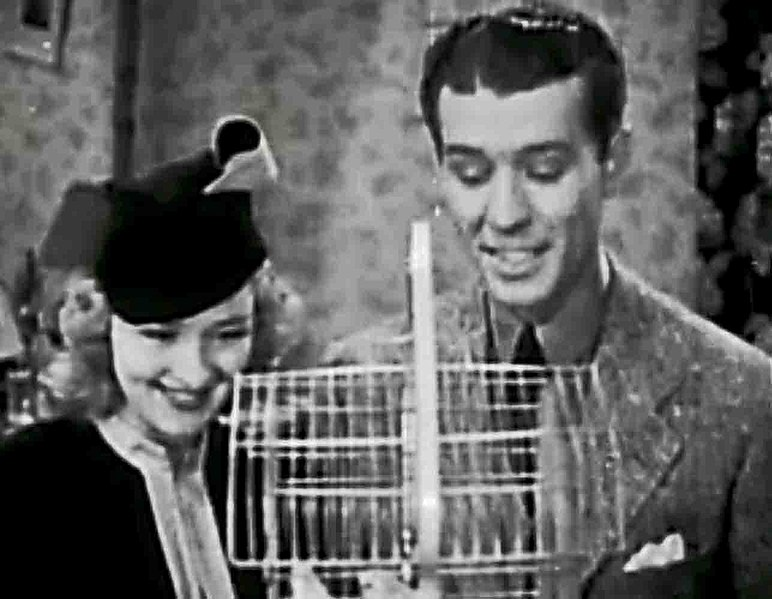
- Marian Marsh and Gordon Oliver in Youth on Parole
- Directed by: Phil Rosen
- Written by: Hershel Rebuas; Henry Blankfort (additional dialogue)
- Produced by: Phil Rosen (associate producer)
- Starring: Marian Marsh; Gordon Oliver
- Cinematography: Edward Snyder
- Edited by: Ernest J. Nims
- Music by: Alberto Colombo (uncredited)
- Release date: 4 October 1937
- Running time: 62 minutes 53 minutes (edited American version)
- Country: United States
- Language: English

Youth on Parole is a 1937 American drama film directed by Phil Rosen and starring Marian Marsh and Gordon Oliver.

== Plot ==
"Bobbie" Blake and Phillip Henderson are complete strangers looking in a jewelry store window, when a hood known as "The Sparkler" smashes the window and steals the jewelry display. He sets the two up to take the rap, stashing some of the loot in their coat pockets as The Sparkler and his accomplices makes their getaway. The two innocent bystanders are immediately arrested.

No one believes that they are innocent, not even their public defender. When they serve their time in "The Joint", no one will give them a break with their prison record, not even their own families; and they cannot keep a job.

Their Irish landlady, Mrs. Abernathy, likes them and encourages them to get married.

Despite the danger, Phil convinces Bobbie that their only chance is to see "The Sparkler" and even the score.

== Cast ==
- Marian Marsh as 'Bobbie' Blake
- Gordon Oliver as Phillip Henderson
- Margaret Dumont as Mrs. Abernathy (landlady)
- Peggy Shannon as Peggy
- Miles Mander as Sparkler (gang leader)
- Sarah Padden as Mrs. Blair
- Wade Boteler as Mr. Blair
- Mary Kornman as Mae Blair
- Joe Caits as Fingy (robber)
- Milburn Stone as Ratty (robber)
- Harry Tyler as Danny Hinkle (cellmate)
- Ranny Weeks as Michael Martin
- Theodore von Eltz as The Public Defender
- Ula Love as Maizie
- Paul Stanton as Police inspector
- Fred Toones as Redcap (uncredited)
