= And One Was Beautiful =

1940 film directed by Robert B. Sinclair

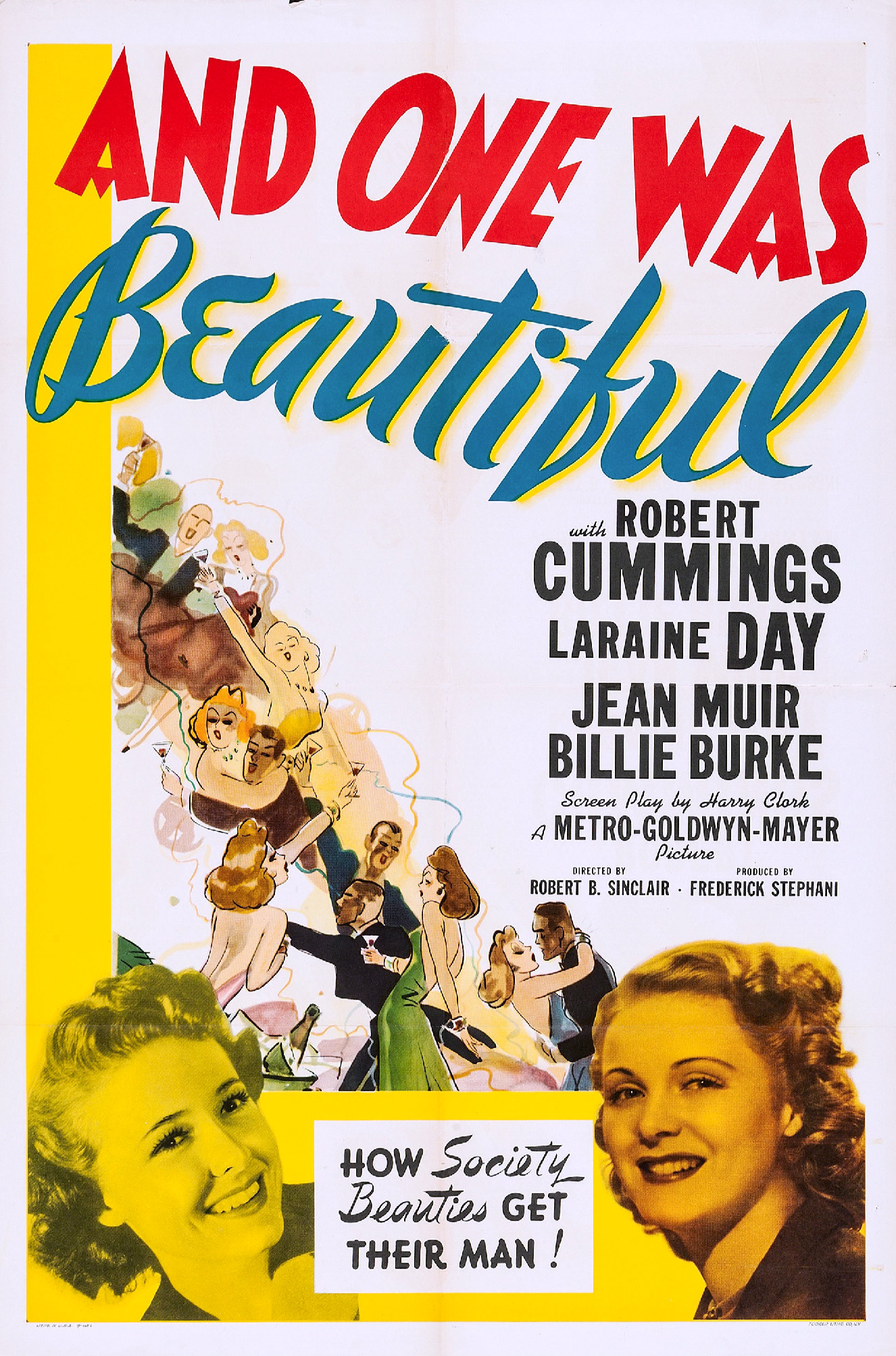
- Film poster
- Directed by: Robert B. Sinclair
- Written by: Kathryn Scola (uncredited)
- Screenplay by: Harry Clork
- Based on: And One Was Beautiful; 1937 novel Alice Duer Miller
- Produced by: Frederick Stephani
- Starring: Robert Cummings; Laraine Day; Jean Muir
- Cinematography: Ray June
- Edited by: Conrad A. Nervig
- Music by: Daniele Amfitheatrof
- Production company: Metro-Goldwyn-Mayer
- Distributed by: Loew's Inc
- Release date: April 5, 1940
- Running time: 68-70 minutes
- Country: United States
- Language: English

And One Was Beautiful is a 1940 American romantic drama film directed by Robert B. Sinclair and starring Robert Cummings, Laraine Day, and Jean Muir. It is based on the story of the same name by Alice Duer Miller. Two sisters are attracted to a rich playboy. One runs over and kills a man, and lets the playboy take the blame.

== Plot ==
Glamorous socialite Helen Lattimer is reaching for the top of society, while her younger sister Kate is perfectly content as she is.

Helen is very determined not to go to a seemingly dull party, so she sends Kate instead. At the party, Kate meets playboy Ridley Crane. They hit it off and spend the evening talking about cars. Kate is instantly smitten by Ridley, but he is more interested in her beautiful and more glamorous sister.

The night after, Ridley gets drunk at a road house and passes out. Helen decides to drive him home in his sports car, but she is not used to the roadster manual shift gear and hits and kills a bicyclist. Helen runs away, leaving Ridley behind in the car. Ridley is arrested and charged with manslaughter.

When Helen returns home very upset, Kate suspects that there is something wrong. Helen has stains on her driving gloves and she immediately starts burying a small package in the garden. Kate digs up the package, which contains her sister's shoe with a missing heel. Kate knows that a heel was found in Ridley's car, but when she confronts her sister, Helen denies everything.

Kate goes on to tell Ridley about what she has found, but he decides to shield Helen and pleads guilty. The judge makes an example of him and sentences him to five to ten years in Sing Sing. Kate takes every opportunity to remind her sister that she is responsible, driving Helen to marry a lawyer to escape the incessant accusations.

Kate visits Ridley as often as allowed. Ridley has arranged for the dead man's family to be financially secure, and Kate sees them regularly as well to make sure everything is all right. Kate eventually has them write letters to the governor asking for a pardon. It works. Meanwhile, Helen separates from a husband she finds excruciatingly boring. When Ridley is released from prison, she is eagerly waiting for him, assuming they will get married, but he proposes to Kate instead.

== Cast ==
- Robert Cummings as Ridley Crane
- Laraine Day as Kate Lattimer
- Jean Muir as Helen Lattimer
- Billie Burke as Mrs. Julia Lattimer, mother of Kate and Helen
- Ann Morriss as Gertrude Hunter
- Esther Dale as Margaret
- Charles Waldron as Stephen Harridge
- Frank Milan as George Olcott
- Rand Brooks as Joe Havens
- Paul Stanton as Arthur Prince
- Ruth Tobey as Zillah Torrington, a daughter of the dead bicyclist

== Production ==
The film was based on a novel by Alice Duer Miller which was bought by MGM in October 1937. The book was published in February 1938, The New York Times calling it "an exciting story of manslaughter".

In November 1939 MGM announced that Maureen O'Sullivan would star, Frederick Stephani would produce and Kathryn Scola was writing the screenplay. Virginia Bruce was cast in January 1940.

In February Laraine Day replaced Maureen O'Sullivan and Bob Cummings and Billie Burke joined the cast. Filming took place from February to March 1940. Cummings was borrowed from Universal.

== Reception ==
The New York Times said it was "more prosaic than lyric."
