= Paul Stanton (actor) =

American character actor (1884–1955)

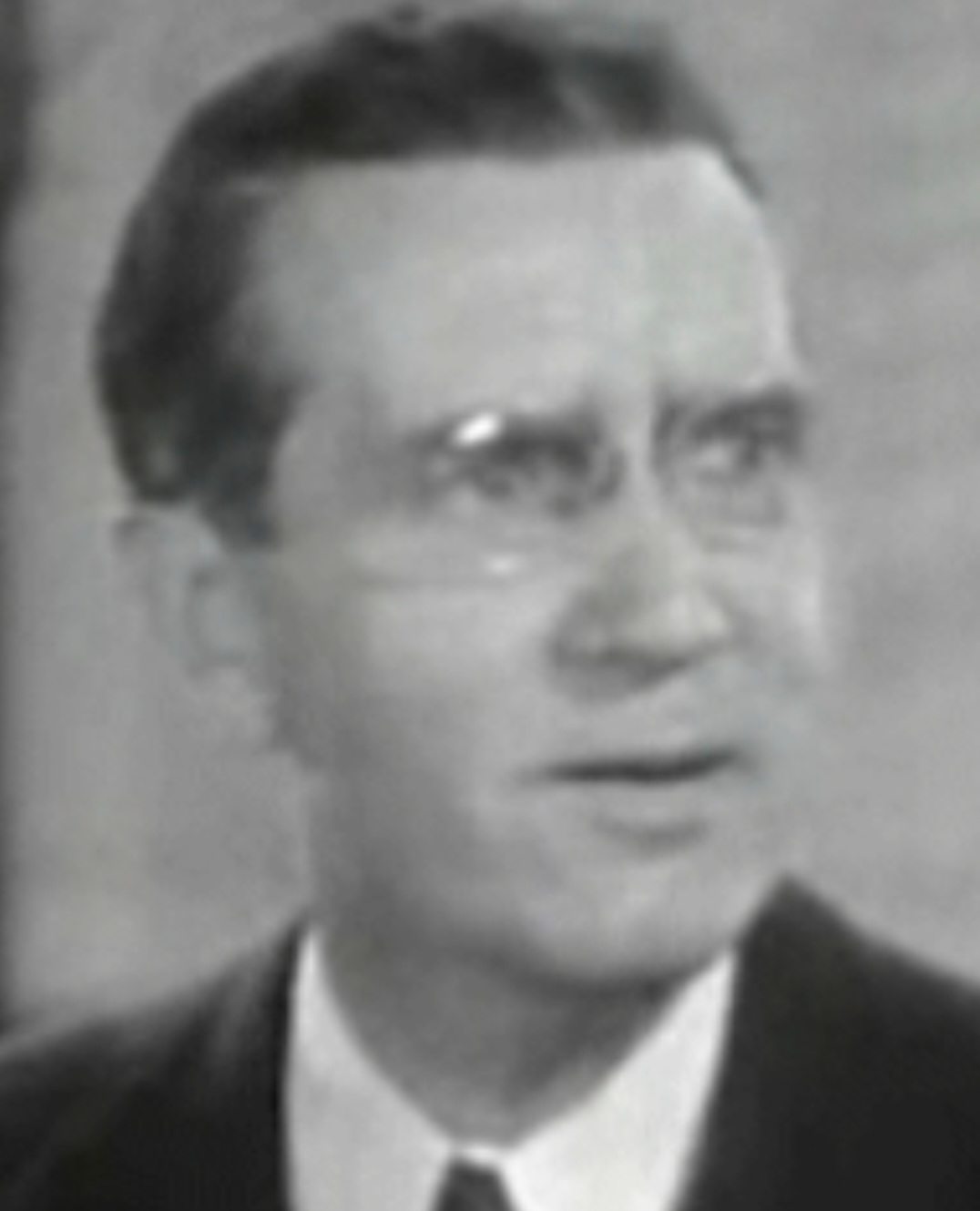
- Stanton in Youth on Parole (1937)
- Born: Paul George Stahl; December 21, 1884; Sterling, Illinois, U.S.
- Died: October 9, 1955 (aged 70); Los Angeles, California, U.S.
- Occupation: Actor
- Years active: 1933–19??

Paul Stanton (born Paul George Stahl; December 21, 1884 – October 9, 1955) was an American character actor and bit-part player in American films.

Stanton was a contract player with 20th Century-Fox. Originally from Illinois, he appeared in about 130 films between 1918 and 1952, mostly in supporting roles. He often portrayed authoritarian figures like judges, attorneys, managers, officials and doctors.

== Selected filmography ==
- The Girl and the Judge (1918) - Walter Stuyvesant
- The Glorious Adventure (1918) - Bob Williamson
- Her Price (1918) - Robert Carroll
- Should Ladies Behave (1933) - Oscar McFarrey (uncredited)
- The Women in His Life (1933) - Judge Malone (uncredited)
- This Side of Heaven (1934) - Doctor (scenes deleted)
- Viva Villa! (1934) - Newspaperman (scenes deleted)
- Stand Up and Cheer! (1934) - Senator (uncredited)
- The Most Precious Thing in Life (1934) - Charles Kelsey (uncredited)
- Call It Luck (1934) - Mr. Morgan (uncredited)
- His Greatest Gamble (1934) - Detective Connors (uncredited)
- She Was a Lady (1934) - Minor Role (uncredited)
- Marie Galante (1934) - Assistant to Head of Bureau in Washington (uncredited)
- Wednesday's Child (1934) - Keyes
- Anne of Green Gables (1934) - Dr. Terry (uncredited)
- Times Square Lady (1935) - Barney Engel (uncredited)
- West Point of the Air (1935) - Officer at Randolph Air Field (uncredited)
- Strangers All (1935) - Prosecuting Attorney
- Let 'Em Have It (1935) - Department Chief
- Red Salute (1935) - Louis Martin
- Another Face (1935) - Bill Branch - Director
- Whipsaw (1935) - Chief Hughes
- The Prisoner of Shark Island (1936) - Agitating Orator (uncredited)
- It Had to Happen (1936) - Mayor of New York (uncredited)
- Every Saturday Night (1936) - Mr. Mewell
- Charlie Chan at the Circus (1936) - Joe Kinney
- Gentle Julia (1936) - Minister (uncredited)
- Champagne Charlie (1936) - Board Member (uncredited)
- Half Angel (1936) - District Attorney
- The Road to Glory (1936) - Army Captain
- Private Number (1936) - Rawlings
- Sins of Man (1936) - Minister
- Poor Little Rich Girl (1936) - George Hathaway
- The Crime of Dr. Forbes (1936) - Dr. John Creighton
- Sing, Baby, Sing (1936) - Brewster
- Star for a Night (1936) - Announcer (uncredited)
- The Longest Night (1936) - Mr. Grover, Head Buyer for the Store
- Dimples (1936) - Mr. St. Clair
- The Public Pays (1936, Short) - Moran (uncredited)
- Crack-Up (1936) - Daniel D. Harrington
- Career Woman (1936) - Arthur Henshaw
- Black Legion (1937) - Barham
- Dangerous Number (1937) - Police Sergeant (uncredited)
- Man of the People (1937) - District Attorney Joel Stringer
- Time Out for Romance (1937) - Harmon (uncredited)
- Midnight Taxi (1937) - Agent J. W. McNeary
- A Star Is Born (1937) - Academy Award Presenter (uncredited)
- It Could Happen to You (1937) - District Attorney
- Between Two Women (1937) - Mr. Sloan's Attorney (uncredited)
- It Can't Last Forever (1937) - U.S. Attorney (uncredited)
- Stella Dallas (1937) - Arthur W. Morley (uncredited)
- Souls at Sea (1937) - Defense Attorney (uncredited)
- Danger – Love at Work (1937) - Hilton
- Youth on Parole (1937) - Police Inspector
- The Awful Truth (1937) - Judge (uncredited)
- Portia on Trial (1937) - Judge
- Paid to Dance (1937) - Charles Kennedy
- City Girl (1938) - Ralph Chaney (uncredited)
- Condemned Women (1938) - Judge (uncredited)
- Law of the Underworld (1938) - Barton
- Kentucky Moonshine (1938) - Mortimer Hilton
- Rascals (1938) - Dr. Cecil Carter
- Army Girl (1938) - Maj. Thorndike
- My Lucky Star (1938) - Dean Reed
- The Story of Alexander Graham Bell (1939) - Chauncey Smith
- Rose of Washington Square (1939) - District Attorney
- Undercover Doctor (1939) - Courtney Weld
- Bachelor Mother (1939) - Hargraves
- Stronger Than Desire (1939) - Assistant D.A. Galway
- They Shall Have Music (1939) - Inspector Johnson (uncredited)
- Stanley and Livingstone (1939) - David Webb (scenes deleted)
- The Star Maker (1939) - Mr. Coyle
- Hollywood Cavalcade (1939) - Filson
- Mr. Smith Goes to Washington (1939) - Flood - Newsman (uncredited)
- 20,000 Men a Year (1939) - Gerald Grant
- The Man Who Wouldn't Talk (1940) - Attorney Cluett
- And One Was Beautiful (1940) - Arthur Prince
- Queen of the Mob (1940) - Mr. Edmonds - Bank Manager
- I Love You Again (1940) - Mr. Littlejohn Sr.
- I Want a Divorce (1940) - Judge (uncredited)
- Public Deb No. 1 (1940) - Director (uncredited)
- Lady with Red Hair (1940) - Prosecuting Attorney Winter (uncredited)
- Road Show (1941) - Dr. Thorndyke (uncredited)
- Men of Boys Town (1941) - Dr. Trem Fellows (uncredited)
- Strange Alibi (1941) - Prosecutor
- The People vs. Dr. Kildare (1941) - Mr. Reynolds
- The Big Store (1941) - George Hastings
- Whistling in the Dark (1941) - Jennings
- The Night of January 16th (1941) - District Attorney
- The Body Disappears (1941) - Prosecutor (uncredited)
- You're in the Army Now (1941) - Lt. Col. Rogers
- Remember the Day (1941) - Committeeman (uncredited)
- Pacific Blackout (1941) - Judge
- The Adventures of Martin Eden (1942) - Attorney (uncredited)
- The Magnificent Dope (1942) - Peters
- Across the Pacific (1942) - Colonel Hart
- My Heart Belongs to Daddy (1942) - Mr. Whitman (uncredited)
- Lucky Jordan (1942) - George Hunnicutt - Draft Official (uncredited)
- Life Begins at Eight-Thirty (1942) - Store Official (uncredited)
- Flight for Freedom (1943) - Airport Official (uncredited)
- Slightly Dangerous (1943) - Stanhope
- Air Raid Wardens (1943) - Capt. Biddle
- Crash Dive (1943) - Officer (uncredited)
- So's Your Uncle (1943) - John L. Curtis
- Government Girl (1943) - Cedric L. Harvester (uncredited)
- Shine On, Harvest Moon (1944) - Ted Harvey (uncredited)
- Once Upon a Time (1944) - Dunhill (uncredited)
- Mr. Winkle Goes to War (1944) - A.B. Simkins (uncredited)
- Allergic to Love (1944) - Mr. Bradley
- She Gets Her Man (1945) - Dr. Bleaker
- Hit the Hay (1945) - J. Bellingham Parks
- The Stork Club (1945) - Mr. Hanson - Locke's Credit Manager (uncredited)
- Crime of the Century (1946) - Andrew Madison
- Holiday in Mexico (1946) - Sir Edward Owen (uncredited)
- Shadow of a Woman (1946) - Dr. Nelson Norris (uncredited)
- Sister Kenny (1946) - Dr. Gideon (uncredited)
- That's My Gal (1947) - Governor Thompson
- Welcome Stranger (1947) - Mr. Daniels
- Cry Wolf (1947) - Davenport
- Her Husband's Affairs (1947) - Dr. Frazee
- Always Together (1947) - Dr. Peters (uncredited)
- My Wild Irish Rose (1947) - Augustus Piton
- Here Comes Trouble (1948) - Attorney Martin Stafford
- Look for the Silver Lining (1948) - Mr. Hoffman - Show Director (uncredited)
- The Fountainhead (1949) - Dean Who Expels Roark (uncredited)
- The Second Face (1950) - Dr. Crenshaw (uncredited)
- Santa Fe (1951) - Col. Cyrus K. Holliday (uncredited)
- Jet Job (1952) - Chairman (final film role)
