= Addison Richards =

American actor (1902–1964)

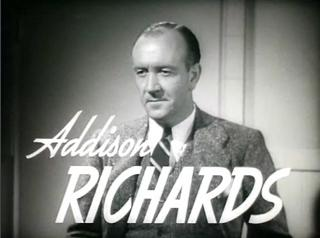
- Richards in the trailer for Nick Carter, Master Detective, 1939
- Born: Addison Whitaker Richards, Jr. October 20, 1902; Zanesville, Ohio, U.S.
- Died: March 22, 1964 (aged 61); Los Angeles, California, U.S.
- Resting place: Oak Park Cemetery in Claremont, California
- Occupations: Film and television actor
- Years active: 1933–1964
- Spouses: Vivian Eccles (m. 1930; died 1946) Patricia Sarazln (m. 1952)
- Children: 1

Addison Whittaker Richards, Jr. (October 20, 1902 – March 22, 1964) was an American actor of film and television. Richards appeared in more than 300 films between 1933 and his death in 1964.

== Biography ==
Richards was a native of Zanesville, Ohio; his grandfather was a mayor of Zanesville. Following his father's death, the family moved to California. Richards graduated with a bachelor of arts degree from Washington State College.

== Stage and screen ==
In 1931 Addison Richards joined the Pasadena Playhouse as actor and associate director. He entered motion pictures in 1933. Warner Bros. signed him to a nonexclusive five-year contract in 1934, and he appeared steadily in that studio's feature films. His dignified, businesslike demeanor established him as a character actor, and he almost always played professional men of authority: doctors, attorneys, judges, executives, military officers, legislators, prison wardens, etc. Richards became such a fixture at Warners that he can often be seen in the studio's annual blooper reels of the late 1930s (Breakdowns of 1937, etc.).

While working at Warners he accepted roles offered by other studios: Metro-Goldwyn-Mayer, Paramount Pictures, Universal Pictures, and RKO Radio Pictures. Later he also worked at Republic Pictures and Monogram Pictures. Today's audiences may recognize him from the James Cagney feature G Men; the Andy Hardy series (as neighbor Polly Benedict's father); the Mae West-W. C. Fields collaboration My Little Chickadee; the Charlie Chan mysteries Charlie Chan in Panama and The Shanghai Cobra; the western Badlands of Dakota, in which he played George Armstrong Custer; the Laurel and Hardy feature A-Haunting We Will Go; the Charlie Chaplin production Monsieur Verdoux; and the Bowery Boys comedy High Society.

In 1956, Richards appeared as Doc Jennings in The Fastest Gun Alive starring Glenn Ford, and as the marshal in The Broken Star.

== Television ==
Like many veteran screen actors, Richards began working in television, eventually becoming so busy that he slowed his motion-picture work to only one or two features a year. He was cast in many television series, including the syndicated 1950s crime drama, The Sheriff of Cochise, starring John Bromfield. He appeared in six episodes in different roles on the NBC anthology series, The Loretta Young Show (1955-61). Richards played the role of Evanson in the 1957 episode "Venus of Park Avenue" on the CBS crime drama, Richard Diamond, Private Detective. He appeared in different roles in two episodes of the CBS crime drama Checkmate (1961), and appeared in the "Mi's Citizenship" episode of the NBC family drama National Velvet (1962).

Richards often appeared in the then-popular genre of TV westerns. In 1957, in the first of three appearances on Dale Robertson's NBC western series, Tales of Wells Fargo, Richards played Governor Lew Wallace in the episode titled, "Billy the Kid". He was cast as Warden Johnson in the episode "Dead Reckoning" on the ABC/Warner Brothers series Colt .45 (1958). Richards was cast as Doc Jay Calhoun in seven episodes of the CBS series Trackdown (1958-59). Richards appeared in the 1959 series The Texan, starring Rory Calhoun, and in two episodes of Cimarron City. In 1960 and 1961, he appeared as Doc Landy in eight episodes of The Deputy, with Henry Fonda and Allen Case. In 1961 was in The Tall Man and Rawhide.

Richards was also seen in situation comedies. He appeared in the recurring role of J.B. Barker in nine episodes of Jackie Cooper's NBC sitcom The People's Choice (1957-58). When NBC adapted its Fibber McGee and Molly radio property for a 1959 TV series, Addison Richards was cast as Fibber's foil Doc Gamble. He appeared in a 1960 episode of Dennis the Menace, starring Jay North, and in two episodes of The Real McCoys. He also appeared as Dr. Butler, 1959, on The Donna Reed Show . Richards appeared on four CBS sitcoms of 1963-64: Pete and Gladys, The Many Loves of Dobie Gillis starring Dwayne Hickman, Petticoat Junction, and twice on The Beverly Hillbillies with Buddy Ebsen. His last television role was as Colonel Saunders in the 1964 episode "The Permanent Recruit" of ABC's No Time for Sergeants, loosely based on the Andy Griffith film of the same name.

== Return to the stage ==
For the summer of 1962, Richards joined the summer stock cast at Denver's Elitch Theatre and appeared in shows including Auntie Mame and The Best Man.

== Personal life and death ==
Richards met Vivian Eccles, daughter of businessman David Eccles, in late 1929, marrying a year later and later had one child, daughter Ann.

Richards died of a heart attack. His interment is at Oak Park Cemetery in Claremont, California. A news story in the March 26, 1964 issue of the Santa Cruz Sentinel reported that services were held at Forest Lawn Memorial Park.

== Selected filmography ==
- Riot Squad (1933) as Diamonds Jareck
- Lone Cowboy (1933) as Dobe Jones
- Let's Be Ritzy (1934) as Lieutenant Spaulding
- The Love Captive (1934) as Dr. Collins
- Such Women Are Dangerous (1934) as Delange
- Handy Andy (1934) as McKechnie (uncredited)
- Our Daily Bread (1934) as Louie
- Beyond the Law (1934) as Morgan
- The Girl from Missouri (1934) as Yacht Captain Hawkins (uncredited)
- British Agent (1934) as Colonel Zwaboda (uncredited)
- The Case of the Howling Dog (1934) as Judge Markham
- A Lost Lady (1934) as State Attorney (uncredited)
- The St. Louis Kid (1934) as Mr. Brown
- Gentlemen Are Born (1934) as Martinson
- Babbitt (1934) as District Attorney
- 365 Nights in Hollywood (1934) as Assistant District Attorney (uncredited)
- The White Cockatoo (1935) as David Lorn
- Society Doctor (1935) as Harrigan
- Home on the Range (1935) as Beady
- Sweet Music (1935) as Mr. Thomas
- A Dog of Flanders (1935) as Herr Herden
- Black Fury (1935) as Government Man (uncredited)
- Eight Bells (1935) as Tracey
- G Men (1935) as Bruce J. Gregory
- Alias Mary Dow (1935) as Martin
- Dinky (1935) as District Attorney
- Front Page Woman (1935) as District Attorney
- The Crusades (1935) as Sentry (uncredited)
- Here Comes the Band (1935) as Colonel Wallace
- Little Big Shot (1935) as Hank Gibbs
- Freckles (1935) as Jack Carter
- The Eagle's Brood (1935) as Big Henry
- Frisco Kid (1935) as Coleman
- The Walking Dead (1936) as Prison Warden
- Trailin' West (1936) as Curley Thorne
- The Case of the Velvet Claws (1936) as Frank Locke
- China Clipper (1936) as Mr. B.C. Hill
- Ready, Willing and Able (1937) as Edward McNeil
- The Singing Marine (1937) as Mr. Fowler
- Smart Blonde (1937) as Fitz Mularkey
- White Bondage (1937) as Kip Gillis
- Black Legion (1937) as Prosecuting Attorney
- Boys Town (1938) as Judge
- Valley of the Giants (1938) as Hewitt
- Flight to Fame (1938) as Colonel King
- Andy Hardy Gets Spring Fever (1939) as Mr. Benedict
- Exile Express (1939) as Purnell
- Geronimo (1939) as Frederick Allison
- Inside Information (1939) as Gerald Banford
- Man from Montreal (1939) as Captain Owens, R.C.M.P.
- Whispering Enemies (1939) as Red Barrett
- Mystery of the White Room (1939) as Dr. Finley Morton
- The Lone Wolf Strikes (1940) as Stanley Young
- South to Karanga (1940) as Edmund Daniels
- My Little Chickadee (1940) as Judge (uncredited)
- The Man from Dakota (1940) as Confederate Provost Marshal
- Northwest Passage (1940) as Lieutenant Crofton
- Charlie Chan in Panama (1940) as Godley
- Edison, the Man (1940) as Mr. Johnson
- Ski Patrol (1940) as James Burton, Speaker
- Andy Hardy Meets Debutante (1940) as Mr. Benedict
- Flight Command (1940) as Vice Admiral
- Western Union (1941) as Captain Harlow
- Forbidden Passage (1941, Short) as Frank J. Maxwell
- Andy Hardy's Private Secretary (1941) as Benedict
- Her First Beau (1941) as Dr. Tom Wood
- I Wanted Wings (1941) as Flight Surgeon
- The Great Lie (1941) as Mr. Talbot
- Mutiny in the Arctic (1941) as Ferguson
- Men of Boys Town (1941) as Judge
- Texas (1941) as Matt Lashan
- Secret Agent of Japan (1942) as Remsen
- A-Haunting We Will Go (1942) as Attorney Malcolm Kilgore
- Flying Tigers (1942) as Colonel Lindsay
- The Pride of the Yankees (1942) as Coach
- Underground Agent (1942) as George Martin
- Adventures of the Flying Cadets (1943) as Jack Hill
- Air Force (1943) as Major Daniels
- The Mad Ghoul (1943) as Gavigan
- Mystery Broadcast (1943) as Bill Burton
- A Guy Named Joe (1943) as Major Corbett
- The Mystery of the 13th Guest (1943) as Jim, District Attorney
- The Fighting Seabees (1944) as Captain Joyce
- The Mummy's Curse (1944) as Major Pat Walsh
- Are These Our Parents? (1944) as Clint Davis
- Black Market Babies (1945) as District Attorney Hamilton
- The Adventures of Rusty (1945) as Dr. Banning, Psychiatrist
- The Shanghai Cobra (1945) as John Adams
- Love Laughs at Andy Hardy (1946) as Mr. Benedict
- Queen Esther: A Story from the Bible (1947) as Haman
- Rustlers (1949) as Frank Abbott
- Henry, the Rainmaker (1949) as Steve Richards
- Davy Crockett, Indian Scout (1950) as Captain Weightman
- The Watchdogs (1954) as starring role in an industrial film for Packard
- The Ten Commandments (1956) as Fan Bearer
- Reprisal! (1956) as Judge (uncredited)
- Last of the Badmen (1957) as Dillon
- The Deerslayer (1957)
- Gunsight Ridge (1957) as Sheriff Tom Jones
- Perry Mason (1957) (Season 1 Episode 7: "The Case of the Angry Mourner") as Attorney George Lansing
- The Saga of Hemp Brown (1958) as Colonel Ford
- The Californians (1958) (Season 2 Episode 9: "Dangerous Journey") as Thomas Durkin
- Lassie (1958) (Season 5 Episode 16: "The Christmas Story") as Dr. Watkins
- Rawhide (1959) (Season 1 Episode 14: "Incident of the Dog Days") as Jed Blaine
- The Oregon Trail (1959) as President James K. Polk (uncredited)
- Alfred Hitchcock Presents (1960) (Season 6 Episode 7: "Outlaw in Town") as Judge
- All the Fine Young Cannibals (1960) as Mr. McDowall (uncredited)
- Inherit the Wind (1960) as Townsman (uncredited)
- The Dark at the Top of the Stairs (1960) as Harris (uncredited)
- The Facts of Life (1960) as Larry's Boss (uncredited)
- Alfred Hitchcock Presents (1961) (Season 6, Episode 33: "A Secret Life") as Mr. Johnson
- Frontier Uprising (1961) as Commander Kimball
- Operation Eichmann (1961) as The Stranger (uncredited)
- The Gambler Wore a Gun (1961) as Doc Devlin
- The Flight That Disappeared (1961) as The Sage
- Perry Mason (1961) (Season 5 Episode 8: "The Case of the Travelling Treasure") as Smith
- Rawhide (1961) (Season 3 Episode 18: "Incident of the Running Iron") as Frank Miller
- Bonanza (1961) (Season 3 Episode 10: "The Horse Breaker") as Dr. Paul Kay
- Rawhide (1962) (Season 4 Episode 19: "The Greedy Town") as Judge Wainwright
- Saintly Sinners (1962) as Monsignor Craig
- Bonanza (1963) (Season 4 Episode 23: "A Stranger Passed This Way") as Dr. Hickman
- Bonanza (1963) (Season 4 Episode 28: "My Brother's Keeper") as Dr. Hickman
- The Raiders (1963) as Huntington Lawford
- Rawhide (1964) (Season 6 Episode 25: "Incident of the Banker") as Mr. Connell
- For Those Who Think Young (1964) as Dean Watkins
