= Air Devils =

1938 film by John Rawlins

- Theatrical poster
- Directed by: John Rawlins
- Written by: Harold Buckley; George Waggner
- Based on: original story "The Fighting Marines" by Harold Buckley
- Produced by: Trem Carr (producer); Paul Malvern (associate producer)
- Starring: Larry J. Blake; Dick Purcell; Beryl Wallace
- Cinematography: Harry Neumann
- Edited by: Charles Craft
- Music by: Charles Previn
- Production company: Universal Pictures Co.
- Distributed by: Universal Pictures Co.
- Release date: May 13, 1938
- Running time: 57, 58 or 61 minutes
- Country: United States
- Language: English

Air Devils is a 1938 American action adventure film directed by John Rawlins, based on an original story, "The Fighting Marines" by Harold Buckley. The film stars Larry J. Blake, Dick Purcell and Beryl Wallace.

== Plot ==
Set in the island of Taro Pago in the years before World War II, two former Marine pilots, John P. "Horseshoe" Donovan (Larry J. Blake) and Percy "Slats" Harrington (Dick Purcell), are hired as air "constables" (constabularies) to keep order on the remote Pacific island. Both friends vie for the attentions of Marcia Bradford (Beryl Wallace) and, through a series of misadventures, find that neither will win out.

The two pilots find that local tavern owner, Tom Mordant (Charles Brokaw), has been stirring up the natives and a civil war is brewing. The two rivals have to combine forces to stop violence and bring the island back to peaceful times.

== Cast ==
- Larry J. Blake as John P. "Horseshoe" Donovan
- Dick Purcell as Percy "Slats" Harrington
- Beryl Wallace as Marcia Bradford
- Mamo Clark as Lolano
- Charles Brokaw as Tom Mordant
- Minerva Urecal as Margaret Price
- Forbes Murray as Capt. Hawthorne
- Paul Sutton as Holo
- LeRoy Mason as Robert Walker
- Al Kikume as Don Kahano
- Michael Visaroff
- Billy Wayne as Sgt. Jennings

== Production ==
Although the title hints at aerial action, there are few flying scenes. There are two dramatic parachute jumps, however, in the climactic battle scene.

Air Devils begins with this prologue: "The Pacific Ocean is strewn with tropical islands, large and small, to which drift adventuring souls. The island are policed and protected by constabularies which function under the local governments. These constabularies are well disciplined military organizations, splendidly equipped and officered by men who have completed enlistments in, and been honorably discharged from, the Army, Navy or Marine Corps, but who have succumbed to the magic spell of the South Seas." Despite the presence of Mamo Clark as Lolano, who had made her film debut in a featured role in Mutiny on the Bounty (1935) and the illusion of an exotic locale embodied by lush sets, Air Devils was a studio property. Universal Pictures began principal photography late March 1938 at Talisman Studios. Air Devils has an aviation-oriented title that is belied by there being very few scenes with an aircraft. Only one Waco biplane is seen in the film.

== Reception ==
Air Devils premiered at 70 minutes, but was subsequently re-edited down to a running time of 57–61 minutes. (Note: The DVD release is 62 minutes.) Typical of many of the low-budget B film of the period, later reviews were not complimentary. "A generic action movie with limited means support. Be it budget or actors. Had a couple of half-decent action scenes, but otherwise a very lackluster storyline which was forgotten as soon as the movie ended." Producer Trem Carr had been behind the numerous John Wayne B films of the same period.
