= Alma Lloyd =

American actress

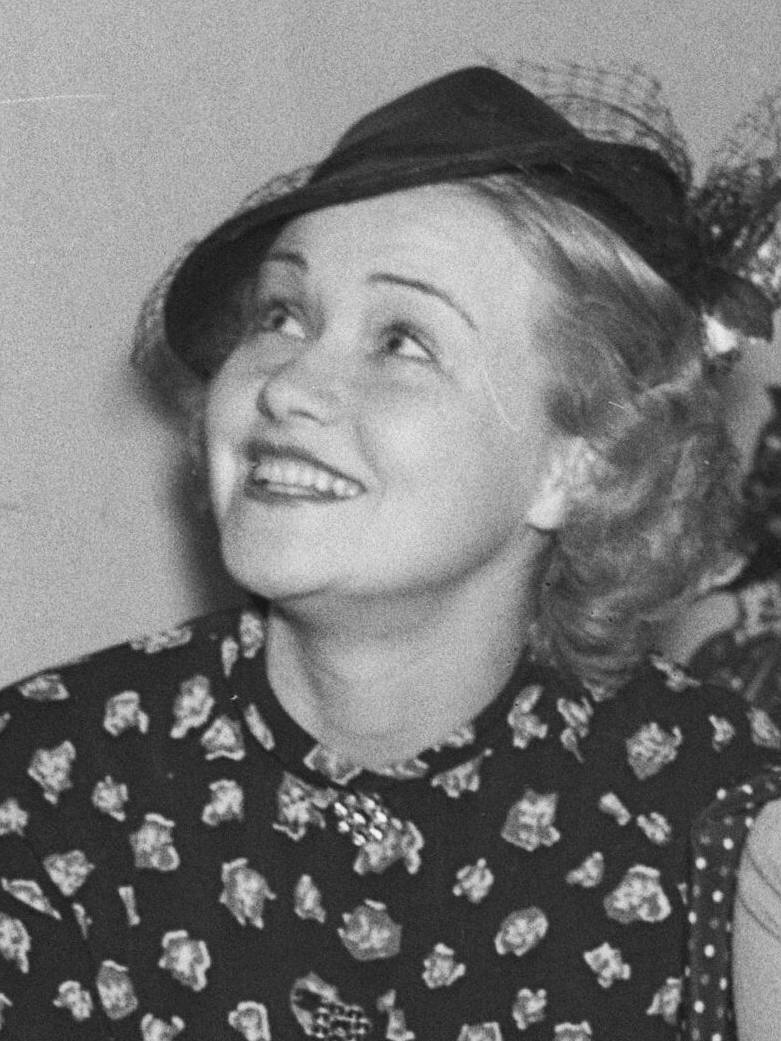
- Lloyd in 1936
- Born: April 3, 1914; Los Angeles, California
- Died: June 14, 1988 (aged 74); Santa Barbara, California
- Years active: 1933–1941

Alma Lloyd (April 3, 1914 – June 14, 1988) was an American actress. She is best known for her roles in If I Were King as Colette, Song of the Saddle as Jen Coburn, and The Big Noise as Betty Trent.

== Family background and personal life ==
Lloyd was the daughter of film director Frank Lloyd. She was the only child of Frank and his wife Alma Haller, who was a vaudeville actress.

On November 11, 1939, she and actor, playwright Franklin Gray were married in Los Angeles. They had met five years earlier on a theater guild production. She left acting to raise a family. She had four children, Christopher who was born in 1942, Antonia born in 1947, Jonathan born in 1951 and Miranda who was born in 1954.

She died on June 14, 1988, aged 74. Her last place of residence was in California.

Her daughter Antonia aka Tonia Guerrero is a retired teacher and translator who as of 2008 was living in Santa Barbara. She has been vocal about preserving the older films as well as introducing Frank Lloyd's films. Two of Alma Lloyd's other children Christopher Gray and Miranda Gray are involved in film. Chris makes documentary films and Miranda is a film editor.

== Career ==
Prior to her film entry as an adult, she had acted on stage and had done reasonably well. She had started out at the Pasadena Community Playhouse. She had also had a couple of acting roles as a child with one in a film that her father was in, playing a villain. In July 1935, she was signed up by Warner Brothers in a long-term contract. In late 1935, along with, among others, Kay Linaker, June Travis, Paula Stone, and Marie Wilson, she was picked for stardom. It was predicted that she along with them would be a fully fledged star by 1938. Also that year, she was pictured in the May 22 edition of the Nashua Telegraph presenting a winners trophy to athlete Frank Wykoff.

In an article that ran in the Chicago Daily Tribune, March 13, 1936 edition, she said that her father was a burden to her career. She said that he embarrassed her friends with his questions, checking up on her and asking people such as Guy Kibbee if she had any talent. She also said that his taking her out and showing her off was affecting her studying her lines and doing her rehearsals.

== Film work ==
At the age of eleven she had a small part in The Wise Guy which her father directed.

She was the co-star of the Louis King directed film Song of the Saddle. She played the part of Jen Coburn. This film which was released in 1936 also starred Dick Foran and Charles Middleton. Her role contributed to the appeal of the film. In the 1936 film The Big Noise aka Modern Madness, she played Betty Trent, a young woman who falls in love with her father's business partner Warren Hull, played by Ken Mitchell. The film plot also involves an extortion plot by gangsters who attempt to get money from her father and her lover. In the November 27 edition of The Lewiston Daily Sun, she was listed along with Claude Rains, Olivia de Havilland and Steffi Duna as the latest cast editions to the Warner Bros. film Anthony Adverse. She played the part of Florence Udney as an adult in the film. She had prepared for the role and put in time studying day and night for her role. According to her co-stars, the director and producer, her work was noteworthy. Her scenes with Fredric March were said to be particular outstanding. The publicity prior to the film's completion indicated or predicted that her part would be one of the most brilliant in the production. When she attended the film's preview with her parents and friends, she was shocked to discover that all of her work had been cut from the film. The reason given was one of excessive footage. Apparently what had happened to Alma Lloyd in Anthony Adverse had happened to other actors in other films. Similarly Valerie Hobson had her work cut from Great Expectations as did Sara Haden with her work in A Midsummer Nights Dream.

=== 1937 onwards ===
In 1938, even though she was one of the principal supporting actors, and even though an important role, it was less prominent than usual featured role as Colette in the film If I Were King. It was both directed and produced by her father Frank Lloyd. In spite of her star which earlier appeared to be on the rise with a co-starring role like she had in Song of the Saddle, and unlike Ellen Drew who also acted with her in If I Were King, her career slowed down.

== Filmography ==
Film
Title	Year	Role	Director	Notes #
Oliver Twist	1922	?	Frank Lloyd	
The Wise Guy	1926	?	Frank Lloyd	
Jimmy and Sally	1933	Mary	James Tinling	
Stars Over Broadway	1935	Girl with Joan at Luigi's	William Keighley	Uncredited
Dangerous	1935	Nurse Behind Counter	Alfred E. Green	Uncredited
Freshman Love	1936	Sandra	William C. McGann	
Song of the Saddle	1936	Jen Coburn	Louis King	Co-star
Colleen	1936	Nurse	Alfred E. Green	Uncredited
Snowed Under	1936	Silent Secretary in Outer Office	Ray Enright	Uncredited
The Singing Kid	1936	Receptionist	William Keighley	Uncredited
I Married a Doctor	1936	Fern Winters	Archie Mayo	
Times Square Playboy	1936	Blonde Information Desk Clerk	William C. McGann	Uncredited
The Golden Arrow	1936	Telephone Girl	Alfred E. Green	Uncredited
Bullets or Ballots	1936	Woman in Curlers Who Won	William Keighley	Uncredited
The Big Noise	1936	Betty Trent	Frank McDonald	Key actor
The White Angel	1936	Nurse	William Dieterle	Uncredited
Public Enemy's Wife	1936	Telephone Operator	Nick Grinde	Uncredited
Anthony Adverse	1936	(adult Florence)	Mervyn LeRoy, Michael Curtiz	Uncredited
If I Were King	1938	Collette	Frank Lloyd	
Bullets for O'Hara	1941	Switchboard Operator	William K. Howard	Uncredited, (final film role)
