= California Mail =

1936 film by Noel M. Smith

- Theatrical release poster
- Directed by: Noel M. Smith
- Screenplay by: Roy Chanslor; Harold Buckley
- Story by: Harold Buckley
- Produced by: Bryan Foy
- Starring: Dick Foran; Linda Perry; Edmund Cobb; Milton Kibbee; Tom Brower; James Farley
- Cinematography: Ted D. McCord
- Edited by: Doug Gould
- Music by: Howard Jackson
- Production company: Warner Bros. Pictures
- Distributed by: Warner Bros. Pictures
- Release date: November 14, 1936
- Running time: 55 minutes
- Country: United States
- Language: English

California Mail is a 1936 American Western film directed by Noel M. Smith and written by Roy Chanslor and Harold Buckley. The film stars Dick Foran, Linda Perry, Edmund Cobb, Milton Kibbee, Tom Brower and James Farley. The film was released by Warner Bros. Pictures on November 14, 1936. It was the fourth of 12 B-westerns Foran made for the studio over a two-year period, and is noteworthy for giving ubiquitous bit player Cobb a rare co-starring role as the chief villain. Roy Rogers makes an early, uncredited appearance as the square dance caller.

== Plot ==
As the Pony Express era is ending, Pony Express rider Bill Harkins, a resident of Gold Creek, is told by his father, Sam Harkins, that the government is terminating their contract, in favor of offering bids to stage coach lines. Bill and Roy Banton are both wooing Mary Tolliver. Three bids are received in Dodge City, including Harkins' and Banton's. Concerned with ambushes along the mail route, the Post Office decides to award the contract to the bidder who can run the route in the fastest time.

Roy Banton and his gang ambush Bill on his return to Gold Creek and assume he has been killed. Bill survives, however, and describes one of the horses in the ambush to his father. At a dance, Roy and Bill come to blows over Mary who leaves the dance upset. Bill later reconciles with Mary.

Roy and his gang sabotage Bill's stagecoach. During the race, Roy runs Bill off the path, down an embankment and his stagecoach crashes. Roy wins the race and is awarded the mail contract. Bill finds evidence of sabotage to his wheel spokes.

En route to Mary's, Bill recognizes Roy's horse from the ambush. Meanwhile, Roy plans to use his contract to rob the stagecoaches and frame Bill by stealing his horse, Smoke. Roy's henchman, Frank Wyatt, riding Smoke, robs a stagecoach in which Mary's father, Dan Tolliver, is a passenger. Tolliver thinks the masked robber is Bill, calls out his name, and is shot. The stagecoach hurriedly leaves. Smoke bucks Wyatt, who drops the stolen money bag, at the scene of the robbery. Wyatt dies from his injuries.

Mary arrives in town to surprise Bill just before the robbed stage arrives with her injured father. Mr. Tolliver dies and the witnesses describe Smoke as the horse in the robbery, implicating Bill. The sheriff arrests Bill and prevents the town from lynching him. Bill and Sam, with the bank's approval, plan to send a fake gold shipment in order to draw out the robbers. Meanwhile, Roy arranges for deputy Pete Nelson to allow Bill to escape on Smoke so he can shoot him for escape. Bill sees through Pete's plan, subdues Pete and goes to convince Mary of his innocence. Mary doesn't believe Bill but allows him to leave. Bill finds Wyatt's body next to the stolen money bag, which convinces the sheriff of Bill's innocence.

Mary leaves town on the stage that has the fake gold shipment. As the stage is being robbed by Roy and his gang, the sheriff and his posse, along with Bill, intervene and a gunfight ensues. Bill subdues the Bantons with the help of Smoke, who bucks Roy, and returns to Bill. Bill and Mary are married and leave town on the Harkins' stagecoach.

== Cast ==
- Dick Foran as Bill Harkins
- Linda Perry as Mary Tolliver
- Edmund Cobb as Roy Banton
- Milton Kibbee as Bart Banton
- Tom Brower as Sam Harkins
- James Farley as Dan Tolliver
- Edward Keane as Thompson
- Ben Hendricks Jr. as Deputy Pete Nelson
- Wilfred Lucas as Sheriff
- Cliff Saum as Man Taking Bets
- Gene Alsace as Jim
- Glenn Strange as Bud
- Bob Woodward as Frank Wyatt
- Fred Burns as Hank Ferguson
