= Let Us Be Gay =

1930 film

- Directed by: Robert Z. Leonard
- Written by: Frances Marion; Lucille Newmark
- Based on: Let Us Be Gay; 1929 play by Rachel Crothers
- Produced by: Robert Z. Leonard; Irving Thalberg
- Starring: Norma Shearer
- Cinematography: Norbert Brodine
- Edited by: Basil Wrangell
- Production company: Metro-Goldwyn-Mayer
- Distributed by: Loew's Inc.
- Release date: August 9, 1930
- Running time: 79 minutes
- Country: United States
- Language: English

Let Us Be Gay is a 1930 American pre-Code romantic comedy-drama film produced and distributed by MGM. It was directed by Robert Z. Leonard and stars Norma Shearer. It was based on and filmed concurrently with the 1929 play by Rachel Crothers which starred Tallulah Bankhead and ran for 128 performances at London's Lyric Theater. Critics generally preferred Tallulah's rendition to Shearer's.

== Plot ==
Let Us Be Gay (1930)

Housewife Kitty Brown does not spend much time on her personal appearance. She is devoted to her husband Bob. Kitty spends all her time seeing that Bob has everything he needs. Bob is embarrassed to be seen with his wife because he considers her dowdy and he does not like the homemade clothes she wears.

Kitty gets a shock when Bob's latest girlfriend, Helen, shows up at their home. Kitty is polite to Helen and pretends that she has known about the affair all along but secretly she is broken-hearted. She excuses herself to go to her room and cry. When she refuses to accept Bob's apology, he leaves, and their marriage is over.

Three years later, Bob is courting Diane. Diane's grandmother, Mrs. Bouccicault, is a leader in local society and disapproves of the match. Mrs. Bouccicault invites Kitty for the weekend. Kitty is now a fashionable, very attractive woman. Mrs. Bouccicault hopes to use Kitty to break Diane and Bob up.

Mrs. Bouccicault asks Kitty to steal a gentleman away from her granddaughter so Kitty flirts with each arriving male guest in turn assuming that each is the gentleman in question.

Bob arrives and is surprised by Kitty's appearance. They pretend to meet for the first time. The other weekend guests, including Townley, Madge, and Wallace, are baffled by the way Bob and Kitty behave around each other. Kitty continues to flirt with the male guests. She speaks disdainfully of marriage and makes it clear she is happily divorced. Diane is engaged to Bruce, who is also a guest. Bruce loves Diane and is pained to see her with Bob.

Townley goes to the terrace outside Kitty's room. She flirts with him. When Bob knocks on the door, Townley hides. Bob begs Kitty to marry him again. Bob hears a sneeze and discovers Townley hiding in the bathroom. He leaves through the terrace only to find Wallace waiting. Wallace has brought Kitty a poem. Disgusted and angry, Bob leaves. A few minutes later Mrs. Bouccicault comes to Kitty's room to announce that Bob has just become engaged to Diane.

The next day, Bob is upset to overhear Kitty making plans for a yachting trip with Townley. Kitty plans on leaving immediately, but her nanny shows up with Kitty and Bob's children. The children are overjoyed to see their father.

Bob tells Diane he still feels he is married to Kitty. Diane breaks up with Bob. Kitty says she does not want him either. She says goodbye to Bob. He begs for another chance. Again, he asks her to marry him. She tearfully tells him she still loves him and she asks him to take her back.

== Cast ==
- Norma Shearer - Mrs. Katherine Brown
- Marie Dressler - Mrs. Bouccy Bouccicault
- Rod La Rocque - Bob Brown
- Gilbert Emery - 'Towney' Townley
- Hedda Hopper - Madge Livingston
- Raymond Hackett - Bruce Keane
- Sally Eilers - Diane
- Tyrell Davis - Wallace Granger
- Wilfred Noy - Whitman, the Butler
- Sybil Grove - Perkins, a Maid
- Helene Millard - Helen Hibbard

== Home media ==
The film was released on DVD through the Warner Archive Collection.

== Production ==
The film was shot quickly (in 26 days) due to Norma Shearer's pregnancy. A French-language version of the film, Soyons gais, was filmed in 1931, directed by Arthur Robison, and stars Lili Damita, Adolphe Menjou, and Françoise Rosay.
