= Guns of the Pecos =

1937 film by Noel M. Smith

- Theatrical release poster
- Directed by: Noel M. Smith
- Screenplay by: Harold Buckley
- Story by: Anthony Coldeway
- Produced by: Bryan Foy
- Starring: Dick Foran; Anne Nagel; Gordon Hart; Joseph Crehan; Eddie Acuff; Robert Middlemass
- Cinematography: Ted D. McCord
- Edited by: Frank DeWar
- Music by: Howard Jackson
- Production company: Warner Bros. Pictures
- Distributed by: Warner Bros. Pictures
- Release date: January 2, 1937
- Running time: 56 minutes
- Country: United States
- Language: English

Guns of the Pecos is a 1937 American Western film directed by Noel M. Smith and written by Harold Buckley. The film stars Dick Foran, Anne Nagel, Gordon Hart, Joseph Crehan, Eddie Acuff and Robert Middlemass. The film was released by Warner Bros. Pictures on January 2, 1937.

== Cast ==
- Dick Foran as Steve Ainslee
- Anne Nagel as Alice Burton
- Gordon Hart as Major Burton
- Joseph Crehan as Captain Norris
- Eddie Acuff as Jeff Carter
- Robert Middlemass as Judge L.F. Blake
- Fay Holden as Aunt Carrie Burton
- Wild Bill Elliott as Wellman
- Monte Montague as Luke
- Milton Kibbee as Carlos
- Bud Osborne as Jake, Blake's Henchman
- Cliff Saum as Bartender
- Henry Otho as Hank Brady
- Bob Burns as Bob Jordan
- Douglas Wood as Texas Governor
