= Robert Armstrong (actor) =

American actor (1890–1973)

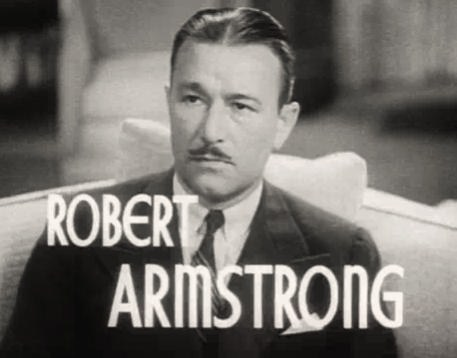
- Armstrong in The Ex-Mrs. Bradford (1936)
- Born: November 20, 1890; Saginaw, Michigan, U.S.
- Died: April 20, 1973 (aged 82); Santa Monica, California, U.S.
- Resting place: Westwood Village Memorial Park Cemetery in Los Angeles, California
- Occupation: Actor
- Years active: 1919–1966
- Spouses: Peggy Allenby (m. 1920; div. 1925) († 1966) Ethel Virah Smith (m. 1926; div. 1931) († 1950) Gladys Dubois (m. 1936; div. 1939) († 1971) Claire Louise Frisbie Armstrong (m. 1940) († 1990)
- Relatives: Paul Armstrong (uncle)

Robert William Armstrong (Note: The reference book Screen World Presents the Encyclopedia of Hollywood Film Actors: From the silent era to 1965 gives Armstrong's birth name as Donald Robert Smith, as do the Dictionary of Pseudonyms: 13,000 Assumed Names and Their Origins, 5th ed. and Golden Horrors: An Illustrated Critical Filmography of Terror Cinema, 1931–1939. Clarke in his 1977 Pseudonyms gave "Donald R. Smith".) (November 20, 1890 – April 20, 1973) was an American film and television actor, best known to today's audiences for playing Carl Denham in the 1933 version of King Kong from RKO Pictures. He delivered the film's famous final line: "Oh no, it wasn't the airplanes. It was Beauty killed the Beast."

== Early years ==
Born in Saginaw, Michigan, Armstrong lived in Bay City, Michigan until about 1902 and moved to Seattle. He attended the University of Washington, where he studied law, and became a member of Delta Tau Delta International Fraternity.

== Career ==
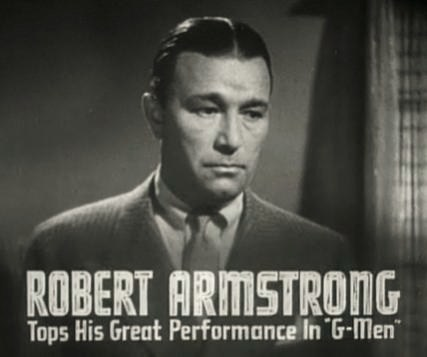
In Public Enemy's Wife (1936)

Armstrong's earliest known stage credit came in July 1915, for a one-act play called The Bank's Half Million, written by Paul Armstrong, who was Robert's uncle. Armstrong was in a 1919 production Boys Will Be Boys; the height of his stage career came with a leading part in the comedy hit Is Zat So?, which ran on Broadway from January 1925 through July 1926.

Armstrong's silver screen career began in 1927 when he appeared in Pathé's silent drama The Main Event. He appeared in 127 films between 1927 and 1964; very prolific in the late 1920s and early 1930s, he made nine movies in 1928 alone. He is best known for his role as filmmaker Carl Denham in King Kong. Months later, he starred as Denham again in the sequel, Son of Kong, released the same year. Armstrong resembled King Kong producer and adventurer Merian C. Cooper, and Cooper used him in several films as more or less a version of himself. The Most Dangerous Game was filmed at night on the same jungle sets as King Kong, which was shot during the day, with Armstrong and Fay Wray simultaneously starring in both pictures. In 1937, Armstrong starred in With Words and Music (also referred to as The Girl Said No), released by Grand National Films Inc. He also worked throughout the 1930s and 1940s for many film studios. Prior to World War II, in 1940, Universal Pictures released Enemy Agent, about countering a Nazi spy ring. In the film, Armstrong co-starred with Helen Vinson, Richard Cromwell and Jack La Rue. In 1942, he was reteamed with Cromwell in Baby Face Morgan, a notable B movie for PRC (Producers Releasing Corporation). Later in that decade, Armstrong played another Carl Denham-like leading character role as "Max O'Hara" in 1949's Mighty Joe Young. This film was another stop-motion animation giant gorilla fantasy, made by the same King Kong team of Merian C. Cooper and Ernest B. Schoedsack.

In the 1950s, he appeared as Sheriff Andy Anderson on Rod Cameron's syndicated western-themed television series, State Trooper. Armstrong made four guest appearances on Perry Mason during its nine-year run on CBS: in 1958, he played as Walter Haskell in "The Case of the Sardonic Sergeant"; in 1961 he played the title character and murder victim Captain Bancroft in "The Case of the Malicious Mariner"; in 1962 he played defendant Jimmy West in "The Case of the Playboy Pugilist"; and in 1964 he played murderer Phil Jenks in "The Case of the Accosted Accountant."

== Marriages ==
- Peggy Allenby (August 1920 - April 17, 1925; divorced) (died 1966)
- Ethel Virah Smith (June 12, 1926 - July 27, 1931; divorced) (died 1950)
- Gladys Dubois (January 10, 1936 - December 31, 1939; divorced) (died 1971)
- Claire Louise Frisbie (January 1, 1940 - April 20, 1973; his death) (died 1990)

== Death ==
Armstrong died of cancer in Santa Monica, California. He and King Kong's co-producer, Merian C. Cooper, died within sixteen hours of each other.

== Filmography ==
- The Main Event (1927) as Red Lucas
- The Leopard Lady (1928) as Chris
- A Girl in Every Port (1928) as Bill / Salami
- Square Crooks (1928) as Eddie Ellison
- The Cop (1928) as Scarface Marcas
- The Baby Cyclone (1928) as Gene
- Celebrity (1928) as Kid Reagan
- Show Folks (1928) as Owens - Promoter
- Ned McCobb's Daughter (1928) as Babe Callahan
- The Shady Lady (1928) as Blake
- The Leatherneck (1929) as Joseph Hanlon
- The Woman from Hell (1929) as Alf
- Big News (1929) as Steve Banks
- Oh, Yeah! (1929) as Dude Cowan
- The Racketeer (1929) as Mahlon Keane
- Be Yourself! (1930) as Jerry Moore
- Dumbbells in Ermine (1930) as Jerry Malone
- Danger Lights (1930) as Larry Doyle
- Big Money (1930) as Ace
- Paid (1930) as Joe Garson
- Iron Man (1931) as George Regan
- Ex-Bad Boy (1931) as Chester Binney
- The Tip-Off (1931) as Kayo McClure
- Suicide Fleet (1931) as Dutch
- Panama Flo (1932) as Babe Dillon
- The Lost Squadron (1932) as Woody
- Radio Patrol (1932) as Bill Kennedy
- Is My Face Red? (1932) as Ed Maloney
- The Most Dangerous Game (1932) as Martin Trowbridge
- Hold 'Em Jail (1932) as The Radio Announcer
- The Penguin Pool Murder (1932) as Barry Costello
- The Billion Dollar Scandal (1932) as Fingers Partos
- King Kong (1933) as Carl Denham
- Fast Workers (1933) as Bucker Reilly
- I Love That Man (1933) as Driller
- Blind Adventure (1933) as Richard Bruce
- Above the Clouds (1933) as Scoop Adams
- Son of Kong (1933) as Carl Denham
- Palooka (1934) as Pete Palooka
- Search for Beauty (1934) as Larry Williams
- She Made Her Bed (1934) as 'Duke' Gordon
- Manhattan Love Song (1934) as Tom Williams
- The Hell Cat (1934) as Dan Collins
- Kansas City Princess (1934) as Dynamite 'Dynie' Carson
- Flirting with Danger (1934) as Bob Owens
- The Mystery Man (1935) as Larry Doyle
- Gigolette (1935) as Chuck Ahearn
- Sweet Music (1935) as 'Dopey' Malone
- G Men (1935) as Jeffrey "Jeff" McCord
- Little Big Shot (1935) as Steve Craig
- Remember Last Night? (1935) as Flannagan, the Milburns' mechanic
- Dangerous Waters (1936) as 'Dusty' Johnson
- The Ex-Mrs. Bradford (1936) as Nick Martel (bookie)
- Public Enemy's Wife (1936) as Gene Ferguson
- All American Chump (1936) as Bill Hogan
- Without Orders (1936) as 'Wad' Madison
- Nobody's Baby (1937) as Scoops Hanford
- Three Legionnaires (1937) as Sergeant Chuck Connors
- It Can't Last Forever (1937) as Al Tinker
- The Girl Said No (1937) as Jimmie Allen
- She Loved a Fireman (1937) as Captain Smokey Shannon
- The Night Hawk (1938) as Charlie McCormick
- There Goes My Heart (1938) as Detective O'Brien
- The Flying Irishman (1939) as Joe Alden
- Man of Conquest (1939) as Jim Bowie
- Unmarried (1939) as Pins Streaver
- Winter Carnival (1939) as Tiger Reynolds
- Flight at Midnight (1939) as Jim Brennan
- The Roaring Twenties (1939) as Hatted Passerby before Nightclub (uncredited)
- Call a Messenger (1939) as Kirk Graham
- Framed (1940) as Skippy
- Forgotten Girls (1940) as Grover Mullins
- Enemy Agent (1940) as Gordon
- Service with the Colors (1940) as Sergeant Clicker
- The Bride Wore Crutches (1940) as Pete
- Behind the News (1940) as Vic Archer
- The San Francisco Docks (1940) as Father Cameron
- Mr. Dynamite (1941) as Paul
- Sky Raiders (1941) as Lieutenant Ed Carey
- Citadel of Crime (1941) as Cal Fullerton
- Dive Bomber (1941) as Art Lyons
- Gang Busters (1942) as Detective Tim Nolan
- My Favorite Spy (1942) as Harry Robinson
- It Happened in Flatbush (1942) as Danny Mitchell
- Let's Get Tough! (1942) as Pop Stevens
- Baby Face Morgan (1942) as 'Doc' Rogers
- Wings Over the Pacific (1943) as Pieter Van Bronk
- Adventures of the Flying Cadets (1943) as Arthur Galt, alias The Black Hangman
- The Kansan (1943) as Malachy
- The Mad Ghoul (1943) as Ken McClure
- Around the World (1943) as General (uncredited)
- Action in Arabia (1944) as Matthew Reed
- The Navy Way (1944) as Chief Petty Officer Harper
- Mr. Winkle Goes to War (1944) as Joe Tinker
- Belle of the Yukon (1944) as George
- Blood on the Sun (1945) as Colonel Hideki Tojo
- Gangs of the Waterfront (1945) as Peter Winkly and Dutch Malone
- The Falcon in San Francisco (1945) as De Forrest Marshall
- Arson Squad (1945) as Fire Captain Joe Dugan
- The Royal Mounted Rides Again (1945) as Jonathan Price
- Gay Blades (1946) as McManus
- Blonde Alibi (1946) as Williams
- G.I. War Brides (1946) as Dawson
- Decoy (1946) as Frankie Olins
- Criminal Court (1946) as Vic Wright, Club Circle Owner
- The Sea of Grass (1947) as Floyd McCurtin (Brewton's attorney)
- Fall Guy (1947) as Mac McLaine
- Exposed (1947) as Inspector Prentice
- The Fugitive (1947) as Police Sergeant
- Return of the Bad Men (1948) as 'Wild Bill Doolin' / Wild Bill Doolin
- The Paleface (1948) as Terri
- The Lucky Stiff (1949) as Inspector Von Flanagan
- The Crime Doctor's Diary (1949) as George 'Goldie' Harrigan
- Streets of San Francisco (1949) as Willard Logan
- Mighty Joe Young (1949) as Max O'Hara
- Sons of New Mexico (1949) as Pat Feeney
- Captain China (1950) as Keegan
- Destination Big House (1950) as Ed Somers
- The Pace That Thrills (1952) as J.C. Barton
- Las Vegas Shakedown (1955) as Doc
- Double Jeopardy (1955) as Sam Baggott
- The Peacemaker (1956) as Sheriff Ben Seale
- The Crooked Circle (1957) as Al Taylor
- Girl with an Itch (1958) as Ben Cooper
- Johnny Cool (1963) as Gang Member
- For Those Who Think Young (1964) as Norman Armstrong, Cronin's Business Associate (final film role)

== Television ==
Year	Title	Role	Notes
1960	Perry Mason	Walter Haskell	Season 2 Episode 4: "The Case of the Sardonic Sergeant"
1960	Alfred Hitchcock Presents	Saloonkeeper	Season 5 Episode 25: "The Little Man Who Was There"
1961	Rawhide	Cal Stone	S3:E27, "Incident Before Black Pass"
1962	Alfred Hitchcock Presents	Doc Buckles	Season 7 Episode 17: "The Faith of Aaron Menefee"
1962	The Alfred Hitchcock Hour	Captain Charles Faulkner	Season 1 Episode 8: "House Guest"
