= Lucille Newmark =

American screenwriter

- Born: 5 November 1880; New York, US
- Died: 6 March 1965 (aged 84); Los Angeles, California
- Occupation: Screenwriter

Lucille Newmark (1880-1965) was an American screenwriter active during the 1920s and 1930s. Little is known about her personal life, but she wrote intertitles during the silent era and scripts and dialogue after that.

== Selected filmography ==
- Miss Pacific Fleet (1935)
- Let Us Be Gay (1930)
- Not So Dumb (1930)
- Untamed (1929)
- Sioux Blood (1929)
- A Single Man (1929)
- Their Own Desire (1929) (uncredited)
- The Cardboard Lover (1928)
- Tea for Three (1927)
