= Strange Cargo (1929 film) =

1929 film

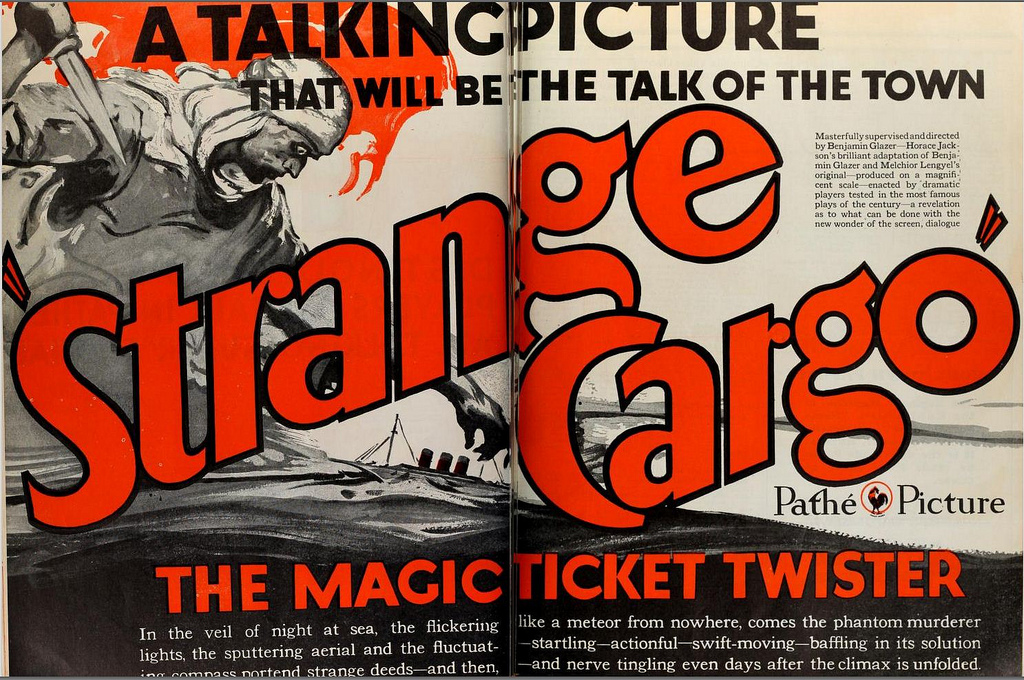
- Directed by: Arthur Gregor
- Written by: Benjamin Glazer; Horace Jackson; John W. Krafft; Melchior Lengyel
- Produced by: Benjamin Glazer
- Starring: Lee Patrick; June Nash; George Barraud
- Cinematography: Arthur C. Miller
- Edited by: Jack Ogilvie; Paul Weatherwax
- Production company: Pathé Exchange
- Distributed by: Pathé Exchange
- Release date: March 21, 1929
- Running time: 75 minutes
- Country: United States
- Language: English

Strange Cargo is a 1929 American mystery film directed by Arthur Gregor and starring Lee Patrick, June Nash, and George Barraud. It was the first full "All-Talking" sound film produced by Pathé Exchange, shortly afterwards to be merged into the major studio RKO Pictures. A separate silent version was also produced for theaters that had not yet been wired for sound.

It was based on a play called The Missing Man, with the adaptation worked on by an uncredited Paul Bern. The film's sets were designed by the art director Edward C. Jewell. It received a good critical reception following its Los Angeles premiere.

== Plot ==
Sir Richard Barclay, wealthy owner of the oceangoing yacht Sprite, invites a select party to accompany him on a pleasure cruise to the Azores. Among the guests are Diana Foster, whom Barclay desires though she despises him; Mrs. Townsend, Diana's protective aunt; Bruce Lloyd, the man Diana truly loves; Paul Hungerford; and Barclay's sister, Ruth.

Although Barclay has long since been divorced, he still pursues Diana with unwanted intensity. One night Bruce discovers him forcing his attentions upon her, rescues her from his grasp, and swears to kill him should he ever repeat such behavior. Unbeknownst to Bruce, the yacht's Captain overhears his threat.

Meanwhile, the crew contends with another mystery: a stowaway has been discovered by the steward and threatens him with death if his presence is revealed. As if this were not enough, strange phenomena trouble the ship, particularly the lights, which flicker and fail at ominous moments. Barclay, fearful and suspicious, sends for Dr. Stecker. Under pressure, the physician is exposed as Dr. Gans, a wanted criminal in London. To prevent further revelation, Barclay forces him to compound a mysterious powder.

One evening, as the entire company is gathered in the main salon, the lights again flicker and finally go out altogether. When candles are lit, Barclay has vanished. A bloodstained knife is embedded in the floor, but no trace of him can be found. The Captain begins a formal investigation.

The guests reveal fragments of Barclay's dark past: he once lived in India, where he incurred the wrath of the Church, and has long been marked for death. Suspicion falls heavily on Bruce, especially as the Captain recalls overhearing his vow of vengeance. Paul produces a newspaper with Dr. Gans’ photograph and criminal record, further muddying the situation. Though the disgraced doctor admits his true identity, he insists he knows nothing of Barclay's fate.

Suddenly, Mrs. Townsend and Diana bring alarming news—Bruce has disappeared. A search leads to the Crow's Nest, where an unconscious man is hidden away by the mysterious stowaway, identified as the First Stranger. Just as Mrs. Townsend, the First Officer, and Paul arrive to hold a séance in hopes of contacting the missing man, Bruce tumbles out of a locker, dazed and beaten from behind. The stowaway emerges, revolver in hand, and confesses he had intended to kill Barclay, though he is astonished to learn the man is missing. He gives himself up, deepening the mystery.

Diana, shaken, suspects Bruce of murdering Barclay and breaks off their engagement. Her doubts grow until Paul stumbles upon another secret passenger—the Second Stranger, a Hindu yogi. Calmly, the Yogi explains that the Church ordered him to slay Barclay. However, having been in a trance, he claims no memory of carrying out the deed. To prove himself, he proposes a re-enactment: the guests will assume their former positions in the salon while he again enters a trance.

The lights suddenly fail once more, and in the suffocating darkness the Yogi's voice rings out: “Of course I killed him, you fools—and hid his body in this suit of armor!” Chaos erupts; he slips through a trapdoor and vanishes. When the lights return, Barclay's corpse lies grotesquely displayed on a table.

The Captain, skeptical of the Yogi's powers, has been waiting outside all along. He captures the fleeing mystic and brings him back in irons. With the true culprit revealed, Diana begs Bruce's forgiveness for doubting him, and the two lovers reconcile. Out of terror and bloodshed aboard the Sprite, their path toward happiness begins at last.

== Cast ==
- Lee Patrick as Diana Foster
- June Nash as Ruth
- George Barraud as Bruce Lloyd
- Cosmo Kyrle Bellew as Sir Richard Barclay
- Russell Gleason as Hungerford
- Frank Reicher as Dr. Stecker
- Claude King as Yacht Captain
- Ned Sparks as Yacht First Mate
- Josephine Brown as Mrs. Townsend
- Chuck Hamilton as Boatswain
- George Beranger as First Stranger
- Otto Matieson as Second Stranger
- Harry Allen as Short
- Warner Richmond as Neil Stoker

== See also ==
- List of early sound feature films (1926–1929)

== Bibliography ==
- Fleming, E.J. Paul Bern: The Life and Famous Death of the MGM Director and Husband of Harlow. McFarland, 2008.
