= The Big Noise (1936 American film) =

1936 film by Frank McDonald

- Directed by: Frank McDonald
- Written by: George Bricker; William Jacobs
- Story by: Edmund L. Hartmann
- Produced by: Hal B. Wallis; Jack L. Warner
- Starring: Guy Kibbee; Warren Hull; Alma Lloyd; Dick Foran; Marie Wilson; Henry O'Neill
- Cinematography: L. William O'Connell
- Edited by: Terry O. Morse
- Music by: Heinz Roemheld
- Production company: Warner Bros. Pictures
- Distributed by: Warner Bros. Pictures
- Release date: June 22, 1936
- Running time: 57 minutes
- Country: United States
- Language: English

The Big Noise is a 1936 American romantic comedy crime film directed by Frank McDonald. It starred Guy Kibbee, Warren Hull, Alma Lloyd, Dick Foran, Marie Wilson, and Henry O'Neill.

== Plot ==
Julius Trent, being unable to adopt new technology retires, from his position as president of a textile company. He then goes into partnership with Ken Mitchell in a dry cleaning venture. His daughter Betty becomes romantically involved with his partner. A group of racketeers attempt to extort money from him so he attempts to singlehandedly run them out of town.

== Cast ==
- Guy Kibbee as Julius Trent
- Warren Hull as Ken Mitchell
- Alma Lloyd as Betty Trent
- Dick Foran as Don Andrews
- Marie Wilson as Daisy
- Henry O'Neill as Charlie Caldwell
- Olin Howland as Harrison
- Virginia Brissac as Mrs. Trent
- William Davidson as Welford Andrews
- Andre Berenger as Mr. Rosewater
- Robert Emmett Keane as Mr. Aldrich
- Eddie Shubert as Machine Gun Nolan
