= James Farley (actor) =

American actor (1882-1947)

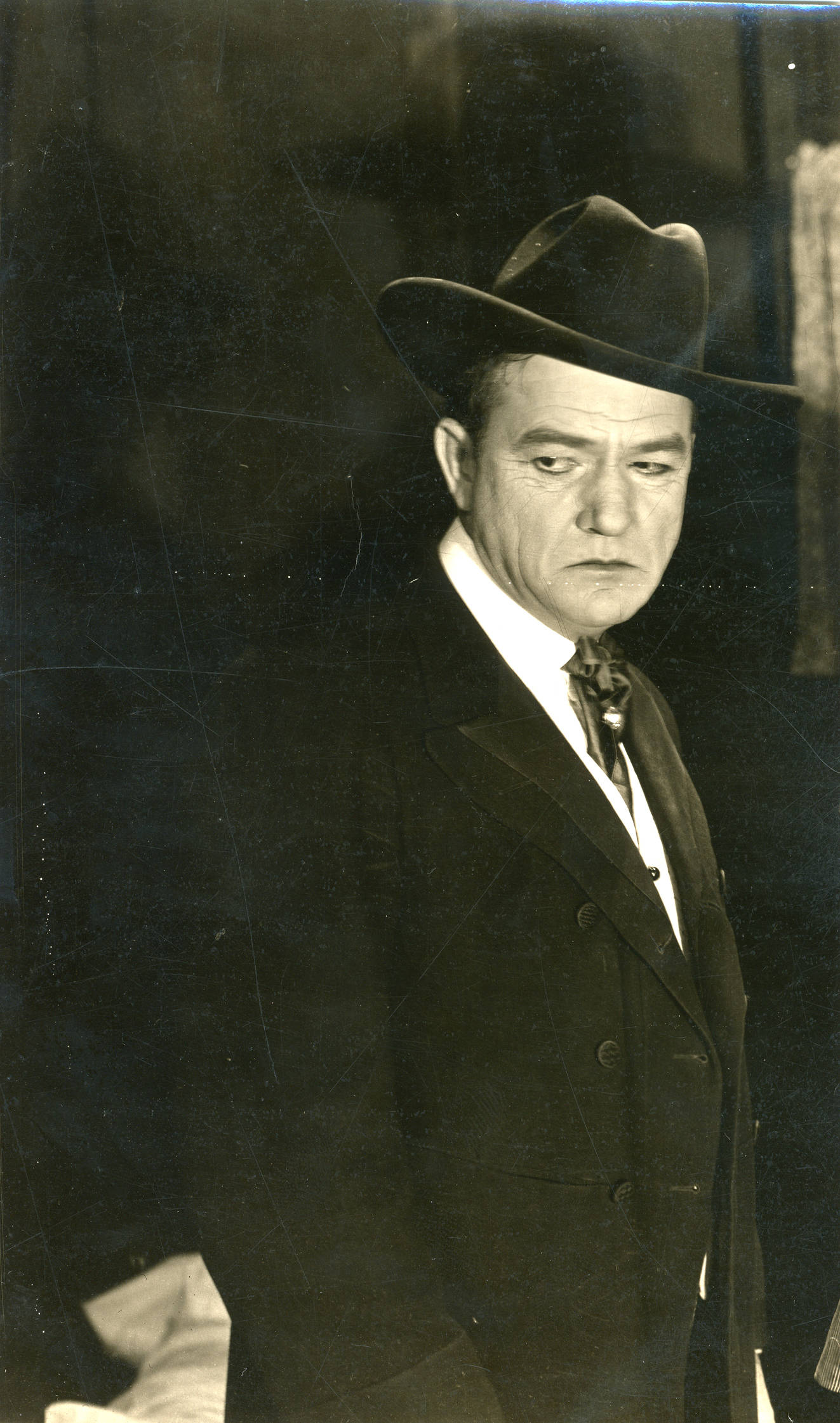
- Farley in 1922
- Born: January 8, 1882; Waldron, Arkansas, United States
- Died: October 12, 1947 (aged 65); Pacoima, Los Angeles, California, United States
- Other name: Jim Farley
- Occupation: Actor
- Years active: 1916–1947

James Farley (January 8, 1882 – October 12, 1947) was an American character actor of the silent and sound film eras.

== Biography ==
Born in Waldron, Arkansas, on January 8, 1882, Farley made his film debut in the 1916 silent film Sins of Her Parent. During his thirty-year film career he appeared in over 200 films and film shorts, including over 175 feature films. Farley worked right up until his death; his final film was released after his death, 1948's The Man from Texas. The production of the film ended in early June 1947, and Farley died shortly after, on October 12, 1947, in Pacoima, California.

== Filmography ==
(Per AFI database)

- Sins of Her Parent (1916)
- The Highway of Hope (1917)
- Desert Law (1918)
- The White Lie (1918)
- The Spirit of '17 (1918)
- Believe Me, Xantippe (1918)
- Her Country First (1918)
- A Lady's Name (1918)
- Desert Law (1918)
- An Innocent Adventuress (1919)
- Nugget Nell (1919)
- Rustling a Bride (1919)
- Sue of the South (1919)
- You Never Saw Such a Girl (1919)
- The Challenge of the Law (1920)
- The Fourteenth Man (1920)
- Alias Jimmy Valentine (1920)
- The Girl in the Rain (1920)
- That Something (1920)
- Bar Nothin' (1921)
- Bucking the Line (1921)
- The Devil Within (1921)
- The One-Man Trail (1921)
- Boy Crazy (1922)
- Gleam O'Dawn (1922)
- Little Wildcat (1922)
- My Wild Irish Rose (1922)
- Travelin' On (1922)
- When Danger Smiles (1922)
- Trifling with Honor (1923)
- Wild Bill Hickok (1923)
- The Woman With Four Faces (1923)
- The City That Never Sleeps (1924)
- A Son of His Father (1925)
- The Lodge in the Wilderness (1926)
- The General (1926) as General Thatcher
- The King of Kings (1927)
- The Tired Business Man (1927)
- The Grip of the Yukon (1928)
- Mad Hour (1928)
- The Perfect Crime (1928)
- A Woman Against the World (1928)
- Courtin' Wildcats (1929)
- The Dance of Life (1929)
- Dynamite (1929)
- The Godless Girl (1929)
- Voice of the City (1929)
- Danger Lights (1930)
- Lucky Larkin (1930)
- Fighting Caravans (1931)
- Charlie Chan Carries On (1931)
- The Deadline (1931)
- Caught Plastered (1931)
- Not Exactly Gentlemen (1931)
- Night Nurse (1931) as Policeman (uncredited)
- Texas Cyclone (1932)
- Scandal for Sale (1932)
- Bachelor of Arts (1934)
- Let's Talk It Over (1934)
- Here Comes the Groom (1934)
- Death on the Diamond (1934)
- Jealousy (1934)
- The Captain Hates the Sea (1934)
- Princess O'Hara (1935)
- Westward Ho (1935)
- Front Page Woman (1935)
- Frisco Kid (1935)
- Air Hawks (1935)
- Silk Hat Kid (1935)
- A Notorious Gentleman (1935)
- Midnight Phantom (1935)
- I Live for Love (1935)
- Transient Lady (1935)
- Diamond Jim (1935)
- Carnival (1935)
- Dancing Pirate (1936)
- The Bride Walks Out (1936)
- Captain January (1936)
- The Milky Way (1936)
- The Petrified Forest (1936) as Sheriff (uncredited)
- California Mail (1936)
- Song of the Saddle (1936)
- Mysterious Crossing (1936)
- San Francisco (1936)
- The Californian (1937)
- Green Light (1937)
- The Wildcatter (1937)
- She's Dangerous (1937)
- Quick Money (1937)
- Submarine D-1 (1937)
- The Great O'Malley (1937)
- The Man Who Cried Wolf (1937)
- Let Them Live (1937)
- Breezing Home (1937)
- A Girl with Ideas (1937)
- The Hit Parade (1937)
- Gold Is Where You Find It (1938)
- The Girl of the Golden West (1938)
- Sweethearts (1938)
- Angels with Dirty Faces (1938)
- Little Tough Guys in Society (1938)
- Love Is a Headache (1938)
- Exposed (1938)
- You Can't Take It with You (1938)
- Zenobia (1939)
- Dodge City (1939)
- Union Pacific (1939)
- First Offenders (1939)
- Code of the Streets (1939)
- The Forgotten Woman (1939)
- Call a Messenger (1939)
- I Stole a Million (1939)
- Mutiny on the Blackhawk (1939)
- Risky Business (1939)
- Santa Fe Trail (1940)
- Sky Bandits (1940)
- Virginia City (1940) as Southerner (uncredited)
- East Side Kids (1940)
- Queen of the Mob (1940)
- Trail of the Vigilantes (1940)
- The House Across the Bay (1940)
- The Devil and Daniel Webster (1941)
- The Bandit Trail (1941)
- Glamour Boy (1941)
- I Wanted Wings (1941)
- In the Navy (1941)
- Look Who's Laughing (1941)
- My Life with Caroline (1941)
- Nothing But the Truth (1941)
- Pacific Blackout (1941)
- Richest Man in Town (1941)
- We Go Fast (1941)
- Rawhide Rangers (1941)
- In Old California (1942)
- Little Tokyo, U.S.A. (1942)
- The Silver Bullet (1942)
- This Gun for Hire (1942)
- Yokel Boy (1942)
- You Can't Escape Forever (1942)
- The Fallen Sparrow (1943)
- Frontier Law (1943)
- Gangway for Tomorrow (1943)
- Hitler's Madman (1943)
- I Dood It (1943)
- Northern Pursuit (1943)
- Quiet Please, Murder (1943)
- Sleepy Lagoon (1943)
- Northwest Rangers (1943)
- The Pride of the Yankees (1943)
- What a Man! (1944)
- Heavenly Days (1944)
- Gentle Annie (1944)
- Christmas Holiday (1944)
- Can't Help Singing (1944)
- Roger Touhy, Gangster (1944)
- The Adventures of Mark Twain (1944)
- Barbary Coast Gent (1944)
- Home in Indiana (1944)
- Marshal of Gunsmoke (1944)
- In Old New Mexico (1945)
- Mama Loves Papa (1945)
- Roughly Speaking (1945)
- They Were Expendable (1945)
- The Valley of Decision (1945)
- Wonder Man (1945)
- Leave Her to Heaven (1946)
- Abie's Irish Rose (1946)
- The Kid from Brooklyn (1946)
- Murder in the Music Hall (1946)
- The Postman Always Rings Twice (1946)
- The Strange Mr. Gregory (1946)
- My Brother Talks to Horses (1947)
- Buck Privates Come Home (1947)
- Ladies' Man (1947)
- Time Out of Mind (1947)
- Curley (1947)
- The Man from Texas (1948)
