= Daughters of Desire =

1929 silent film

- Directed by: Burton L. King
- Written by: Isadore Bernstein; Janet Vale
- Produced by: Samuel Zierler
- Starring: Irene Rich; Richard Tucker; June Nash
- Cinematography: William Miller; Joseph Walters
- Edited by: Betty Davis
- Production company: Excellent Pictures
- Distributed by: Excellent Pictures
- Release date: March 1, 1929
- Running time: 66 minutes
- Country: United States
- Languages: Silent; English intertitles

Daughters of Desire is a 1929 American silent drama film directed by Burton L. King and starring Irene Rich, Richard Tucker and June Nash.

== Cast ==
- Irene Rich
- Richard Tucker
- June Nash
- Julius Molnar
- Jackie Searl
- William Scott

== Bibliography ==
- Munden, Kenneth White. The American Film Institute Catalog of Motion Pictures Produced in the United States, Part 1. University of California Press, 1997.
