= Moonlight on the Prairie =

1935 film

- Film poster
- Directed by: D. Ross Lederman
- Written by: William Jacobs
- Produced by: Bryan Foy
- Starring: Dick Foran
- Cinematography: Fred Jackman Jr.
- Edited by: Thomas Pratt
- Music by: Leo F. Forbstein
- Distributed by: Warner Bros. Pictures
- Release date: November 2, 1935
- Running time: 63 minutes
- Country: United States
- Language: English

Moonlight on the Prairie is a 1935 American Western film directed by D. Ross Lederman. It was the first of a Warner Bros. singing cowboy film series with Dick Foran and his Palomino Smoke. A print is preserved in the Library of Congress collection.

== Cast ==
- Dick Foran as Ace Andrews (as Dick Foran the Singing Cowboy)
- Smoke as Smoke - Ace Andrews' Horse (as Smoky)
- Sheila Bromley as Barbara Roberts (as Sheila Mannors)
- George E. Stone as Small Change
- Joe Sawyer as Luke Thomas
- Joe King as Sheriff Jim (as Joseph King)
- Robert Barrat as Buck Cantrell
- Dickie Jones as Dickie Roberts
- Bill Elliott as Jeff Holt (as Gordon Elliott)
- Herbert Heywood as Pop Powell
- Raymond Brown as Stage agent
- Richard Carle as Colonel Gowdy (scenes deleted)
- Milton Kibbee as Henchman Pete (as Milt Kibbee)

== Critical reception ==
Motion Picture Herald wrote that the film offered "little more than a further presentation of the often tried tooting, rooting, shooting, wild riding western formula ... there being only one departure from standard specifications — that of having the action pause a bit while the star sings."
