= A Single Man (1929 film) =

1929 film

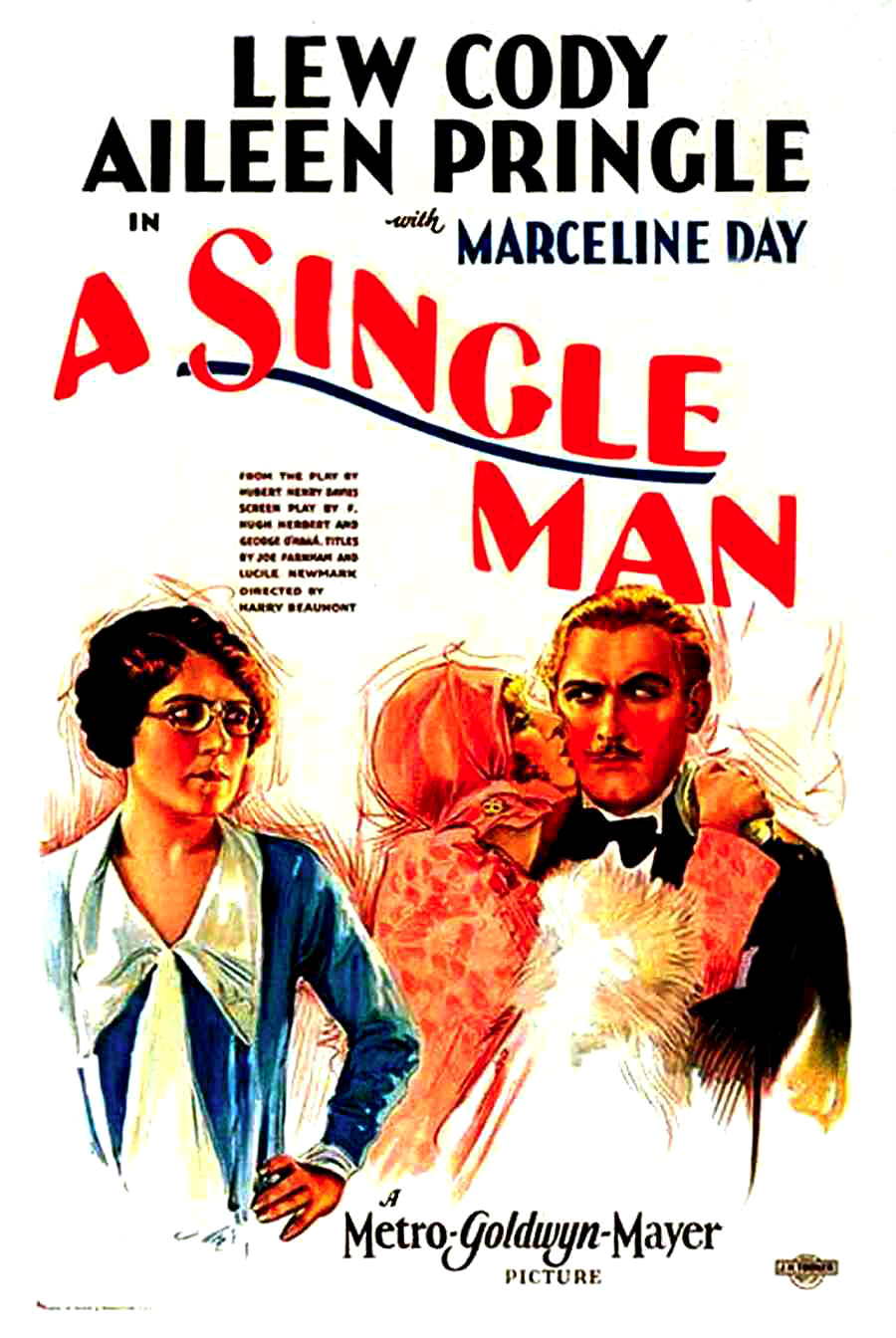
- Film poster
- Directed by: Harry Beaumont
- Written by: F. Hugh Herbert (script); George O'Hara (script); Joseph Farnham (intertitles); Lucille Newmark (intertitles)
- Based on: A Single Man by Hubert Henry Davies
- Produced by: Metro-Goldwyn-Mayer
- Starring: Lew Cody; Aileen Pringle; Marceline Day
- Cinematography: André Barlatier (- French Wikipedia)
- Edited by: Ben Lewis
- Production company: Metro-Goldwyn-Mayer
- Distributed by: Metro-Goldwyn-Mayer
- Release date: January 12, 1929
- Running time: 7 reels
- Country: United States
- Language: Silent (English intertitles)

A Single Man is a 1929 American silent comedy film directed by Harry Beaumont and starring Lew Cody, Aileen Pringle, and Marceline Day. It is based on a 1911 Broadway stage play by Hubert Henry Davies, A Single Man. It was produced and distributed by Metro-Goldwyn-Mayer.

== Cast ==
- Lew Cody as Robin Worthington
- Aileen Pringle as Mary Hazeltine
- Marceline Day as Maggie
- Edward Nugent as Dickie
- Kathlyn Williams as Mrs. Cottrell
- Aileen Manning as Mrs. Farley
- Alona Marlowe
- Harry Murray
- Drew Percy
- Robert Bolder
- Ruth Holly
- Patsy Kelly (Undetermined Role)

== Censorship ==
When A Single Man was released, many states and cities in the United States had censor boards that could require cuts or other eliminations before the film could be shown. The Kansas censor board ordered a cut of an intertitle with the caption, "You great big cave man. I bet you're a devil when you're aroused."

== Preservation ==
With no prints of A Single Man located in any film archives, it is a lost film.
