= Peggy Allenby =

American actress (1896–1966)

- Born: Eleanor Byrne Fox; February 1, 1896; New York City, NY
- Died: March 23, 1966 (aged 70); New York City, NY
- Occupation: Actress
- Spouses: Robert Armstrong (m. 1920; div. 1925) John McGovern (m. 1932)
- Children: 2

Peggy Allenby (February 1, 1896 – March 23, 1966) was an American stage, film, television, and radio actress.

== Early life ==
Allenby was born Eleanor Byrne Fox in New York City and attended the Convent of the Sacred Heart. She entered theatrical work in Nashville.

== Career ==
=== Television ===
Allenby may be best known for her role as "Mattie Lane Grimsley" on the CBS-TV soap opera Edge of Night. Peggy Allenby was in the show's cast from 1956 to 1966. She also appeared on Cosmopolitan Theater (1951), The Philco Television Playhouse (1951), First Love (1954), Studio One (1954) and The United States Steel Hour (1959).

=== Radio ===
From 1930 to 1950, her voice was a part of such radio broadcasts as Second Husband, Young Doctor Malone, David Harum and Road of Life. She had the role of Mrs. Brown, mother of the title character on the comedy serial Claudia, based on the character created by author Rose Franken, and she played the mother in The Nichols Family. Allenby had the title role in Phyl Coe Radio Mysteries.

=== Theater ===
In 1948, she appeared in The Happy Journey to Trenton and Camden on Broadway. Soon after, she replaced Mildred Dunnock, as Willy Loman's wife, in the 1949 production of Death of a Salesman.

== Personal life and death ==
Allenby was married to actors John McGovern and Robert Armstrong. Her marriage with John McGovern produced two children, John Jr. and Eleanor. She died in 1966 in Park West Hospital after a short illness, aged 70.
