= Lucky Larkin =

1930 film

- Directed by: Harry Joe Brown
- Screenplay by: Marion Jackson; Leslie Mason
- Story by: Marion Jackson
- Produced by: Ken Maynard
- Starring: Ken Maynard; Nora Lane; Jim Farley; Harry Todd; Paul Hurst; Charles Clary
- Cinematography: Ted D. McCord
- Edited by: Fred Allen
- Production company: Ken Maynard Productions Inc.
- Distributed by: Universal Pictures
- Release date: March 2, 1930
- Running time: 66 minutes
- Country: United States
- Languages: Sound (Synchronized); English Intertitles

Lucky Larkin is a 1930 American pre-Code synchronized sound Western film directed by Harry Joe Brown and written by Marion Jackson and Leslie Mason. While the film has no audible dialog, it was released with a synchronized musical score with sound effects. The film stars Ken Maynard, Nora Lane, Jim Farley, Harry Todd, Paul Hurst and Charles Clary. The film was released on March 2, 1930, by Universal Pictures.

== Cast ==
- Ken Maynard as 'Lucky' Larkin
- Tarzan as Larkin's Horse
- Nora Lane as Emmy Lou Parkinson
- Jim Farley as Martin Brierson
- Harry Todd as Bill Parkinson
- Paul Hurst as Pete Brierson
- Charles Clary as Colonel Lee
- Blue Washington as Hambone
