= The Main Event (1927 film) =

1927 film

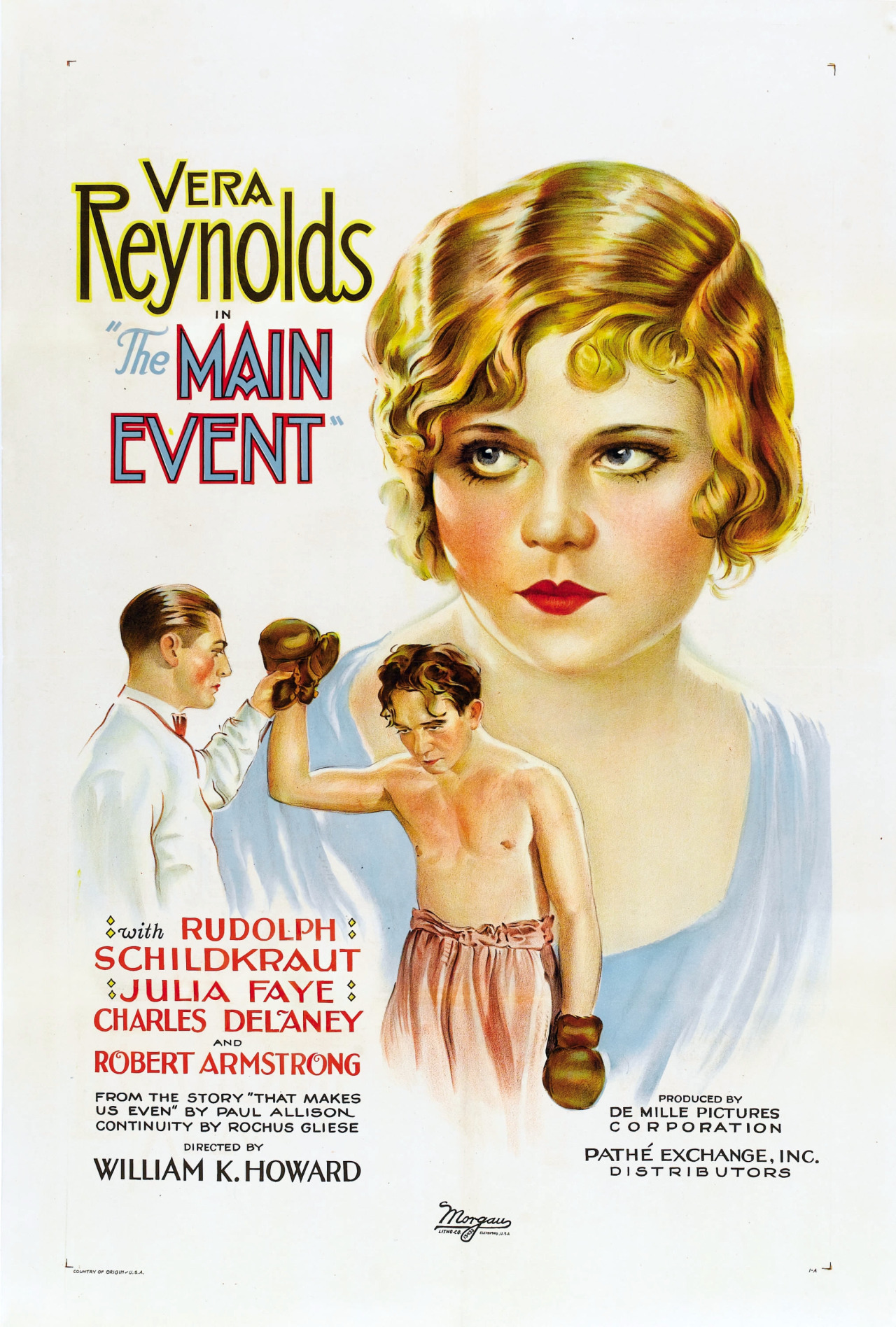
- Lobby poster
- Directed by: William K. Howard
- Produced by: Cecil B. DeMille
- Starring: Vera Reynolds
- Cinematography: Lucien Andriot
- Edited by: Claude Berkeley
- Distributed by: Pathé Exchange
- Release date: November 18, 1927
- Running time: 70 minutes
- Country: United States
- Language: Silent (English intertitles)

The Main Event is a 1927 American silent romantic drama film directed by William K. Howard and starring Vera Reynolds. It was produced by Cecil B. DeMille and released through Pathé Exchange.

== Cast ==
- Vera Reynolds as Glory Frayne
- Rudolph Schildkraut as Regan Sr.
- Julia Faye as Margie
- Charles Delaney as Johnnie Regan
- Robert Armstrong as Red Lucas
- Ernie Adams as Slug-nutty fighter

== See also ==
- Rough House Rosie (1927)

== Preservation status ==
A print of The Main Event is preserved in the French archive Centre national du cinéma et de l'image animée in Fort de Bois-d'Arcy and the Museum of Modern Art.
