= Unfinished Business (1941 film) =

1941 film by Gregory La Cava

- Directed by: Gregory La Cava
- Written by: Vicki Baum; Eugene Thackrey
- Produced by: Gregory La Cava
- Starring: Irene Dunne; Robert Montgomery; Preston Foster
- Cinematography: Joseph A. Valentine
- Edited by: Russell Schoengarth
- Music by: Franz Waxman
- Production company: Universal Pictures
- Distributed by: Universal Pictures
- Release date: August 27, 1941
- Running time: 96 minutes
- Country: United States
- Language: English

Unfinished Business is a 1941 American romantic comedy film directed by Gregory La Cava and starring Irene Dunne, Robert Montgomery, and Preston Foster. It was produced and distributed by Universal Pictures.

== Plot ==
On a train to New York City, small-town singer Nancy Andrews meets and falls in love with sophisticated playboy Steve Duncan. However, Steve ignores her when they reach their destination.

Rejected following an opera audition, Nancy must take a job as a telephone operator performing singing telegrams. Nightclub impresario Billy Ross likes her voice and offers her a job. At the club, Steve's brother and attorney Tommy Duncan becomes inebriated and reveals that Steve is soon to marry another woman. Nancy, also drunk, agrees to escape with Tommy to South Carolina for a quick elopement.

The following day, Tommy discovers that Nancy does not love him. After they return to New York and throw a party, Nancy kisses Steve, angering Steve's new wife and Tommy's old girlfriend. In his disappointment, Tommy enlists in the army and leaves for a year.

When Tommy returns, he punches Steve and prepares to grant Nancy her divorce, but he learns that Nancy and he are parents of a baby boy and that she is overjoyed to know that Tommy still loves her.

== Cast ==
- Irene Dunne as Nancy Andrews
- Robert Montgomery as Tommy Duncan
- Preston Foster as Steve Duncan
- Eugene Pallette as Elmer
- Dick Foran as Frank
- Esther Dale as Aunt Mathilda
- Walter Catlett as Billy Ross
- Richard Davies as Richard
- Kathryn Adams as Katy
- Samuel S. Hinds as Uncle
- June Clyde as Clarisse
- Phyllis Barry as Sheila
- Ferike Boros as Sarah, Nancy's Maid
- Chester Clute as Mr. Beck
- Hugh Beaumont as Hugh, Bridegroom
- Mary Gordon as Miss Brady
- Helene Millard as Helen
- Norma Drury as Cousin Nell
- Renie Riano as Ross's Secretary
- Yolande Donlan as Manicurist
- Fortunio Bonanova as Impresario
- Virginia Brissac as Aunt
- Pierre Watkin as Lawyer
- Paul Fix as Reporter
- Dorothy Granger as Woman
- Phyllis Kennedy as Woman
- Hillary Brooke as Woman
- Dolly Haas as Woman

== Reception ==
In a contemporary review for The New York Times, critic Bosley Crowther wrote:

Any picture which brings Irene Dunne and Robert Montgomery to a state of matrimony, with the directorial blessing of Gregory La Cava, must, perforce and in truth, have a great deal to recommend it. And a great deal of random charm and pleasantly caustic humor, there is, without any dispute, in Universal's 'Unfinished Business,' which provides that denouement in a manner somewhat less than harmonious but sufficiently withal ... But this oddly 'Unfinished Business,' in which they are so desperately involved, is something to tax the credulity of even the most lenient mind. ... In brief, like many another picture, it makes a romantic plot but not much sense. ... Mr. La Cava has done a lot to disguise a foolish script with glib action, but the trick doesn't quite come off. The unfinished business here lies dead in someone's typewriter.
