= Dynamite (1929 film) =

1929 film

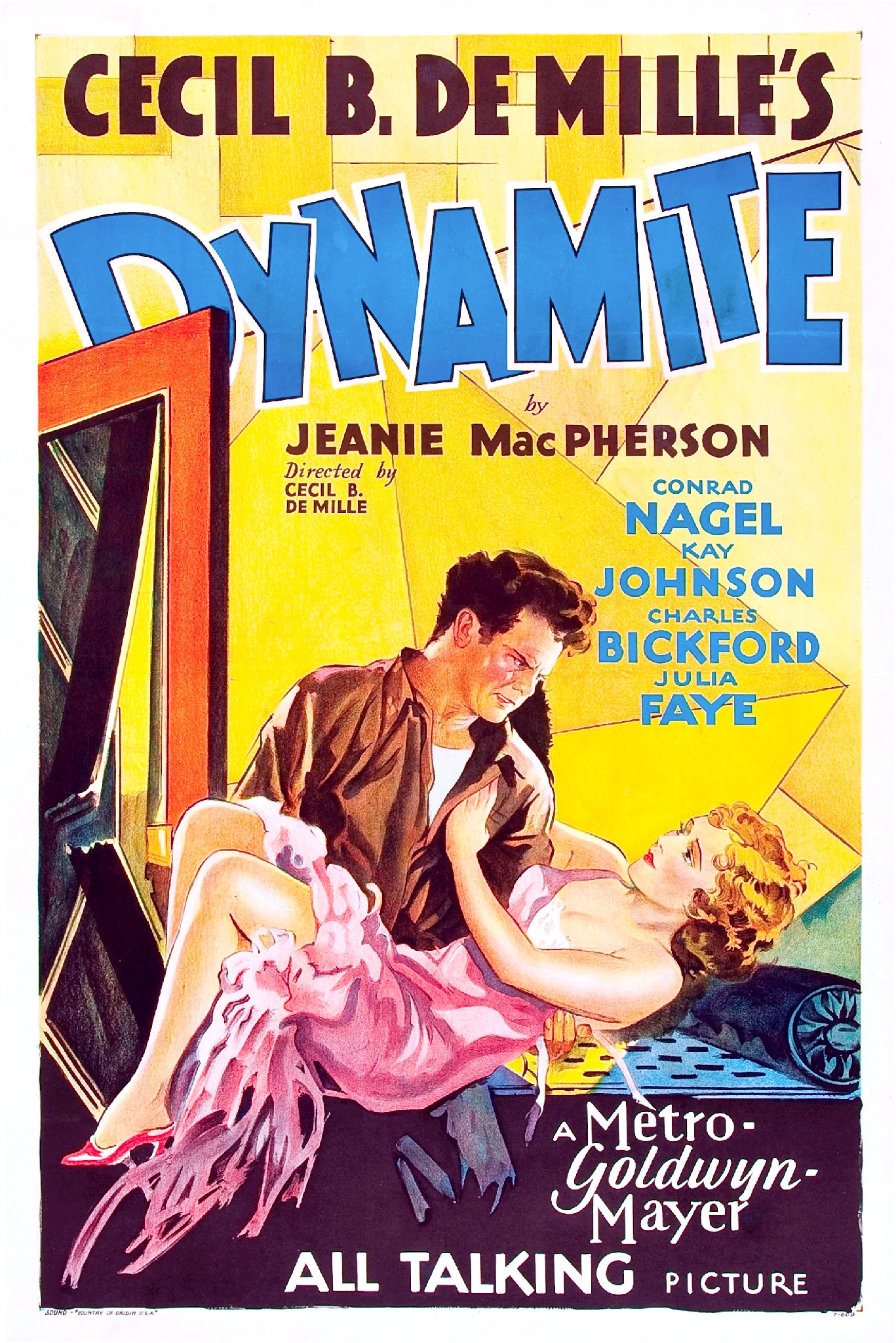
- Theatrical release poster
- Directed by: Cecil B. DeMille
- Screenplay by: Jeanie MacPherson; John Howard Lawson; Gladys Unger
- Produced by: Cecil B. DeMille
- Starring: Conrad Nagel; Kay Johnson; Charles Bickford; Julia Faye
- Cinematography: J. Peverell Marley
- Edited by: Anne Bauchens
- Production company: Metro-Goldwyn-Mayer
- Distributed by: Loew's Inc.
- Release date: December 13, 1929 (USA)
- Running time: 129 minutes
- Country: United States
- Language: English

Dynamite (1929)

Dynamite is a 1929 American pre-Code drama film produced and directed by Cecil B. DeMille and starring Conrad Nagel, Kay Johnson, Charles Bickford, and Julia Faye. Written by Jeanie MacPherson, John Howard Lawson, and Gladys Unger, the film is about a convicted murderer scheduled to be executed, whom a socialite marries simply to satisfy a condition of her grandfather's will. Mitchell Leisen was nominated for the Academy Award for Best Art Direction.

== Plot ==
Coal miner Hagon Derk is sentenced to hang for murder. His only concern is for his young sister Katie, who will be left all alone. Meanwhile, frivolous socialite Cynthia Crothers will not inherit her grandfather's millions and will be penniless if she is not married by her twenty-third birthday (a month away). She is "engaged" to Roger Towne, but he is married to Marcia. Marcia has her own lover, Marco, and is willing to grant Roger a divorce for the right price. The women settle on $100,000 behind Roger's back.

Hagon, desperate to provide for Katie, offers his body for $10,000 in a newspaper ad. Cynthia offers him the money in exchange for him marrying her. He accepts. Just minutes before Hagon's execution though, the real killer is goaded into attacking a man with a gun and is fatally shot. He confesses before dying, and Hagon is released.

Hagon goes to see his stunned wife. When her friends show up to party the night away, he sees Cynthia writing a $25,000 check as a down payment to Marcia and discussing their agreement. Hagon grabs the check and shows it to Roger. Roger tells Cynthia that if she gives Marcia the check, they are through. Cynthia rips up the check. She then announces that she is married. When Hagon reveals he is her husband, Cynthia is made a laughingstock. Hagon throws out the partygoers. When Cynthia locks herself in her room, Hagon breaks down her door. After a brief confrontation, Hagon flings $10,000 at her and leaves.

When Cynthia is informed that she must be living with her husband on her birthday, she drives to his mining town. He refuses to go back to her apartment, so she persuades him to let her stay with him. He agrees on condition that she cook and clean, and locks up her fancy car in his tool shed. Her first attempt at cooking is a dismal failure. Katie helps out and keeps it a secret from Hagon, but Cynthia confesses. Hagon tells her it is the first honest thing he has seen her do.

The next day, while shopping, Cynthia buys a gift for a young boy. His mother objects, but the child runs away with his present and is hurt in a traffic accident. The doctor says that only a brain specialist in the city can save him, but the boy only has hours to live. Cynthia breaks into the tool shed, speeds away in her car and returns with the specialist. The child is saved.

Hagon returns from work to find the door of his shed demolished and learns that Cynthia withdrew $2,000 from the bank (to pay the specialist). He assumes that she got tired of his way of life and went to see Roger. When Hagon demands an explanation, Cynthia is too disheartened to reply. She telephones Roger to come for her. However, the child's mother tells Hagon what Cynthia has done.

When Roger shows up, he insists on seeing Hagon before leaving. They go down into the mine to find him. A cave-in traps the trio with only fifteen minutes worth of air. Hagon finally confesses he loves Cynthia. Then he realizes there is a way out. He quickly packs a stick of dynamite into a wall; there is another chamber on the other side with enough air to sustain them until they can be rescued. However, without a fuse cap, someone will have to strike the dynamite with a sledgehammer to set it off. The two men toss a coin for the privilege. Roger "wins", but Hagon wrestles the sledgehammer away from him. After Cynthia whispers something to Roger, he tells Hagon that Cynthia wants to say goodbye to him. Hagon asks Cynthia to say what she needs to say. Confused, she reveals that she said she loves him. With the two safely out of the way, Roger detonates the dynamite and is killed. As Hagon carries Cynthia into the opened chamber, he tells her that he was wrong about Roger.

== Cast ==
- Conrad Nagel as Roger Towne
- Kay Johnson as Cynthia Crothers
- Charles Bickford as Hagon Derk
- Julia Faye as Marcia Towne
- Muriel McCormac as Katie Derk
- Joel McCrea as Marco
- Robert Edeson as First Wise Fool
- William Holden as Second Wise Fool
- Henry Stockbridge as Third Wise Fool
- Leslie Fenton as Young "Vulture" Firing Gun
- Barton Hepburn as Young "Vulture" Confessing Crime
- Ernest Hilliard as Good Mixer
- June Nash as Good Mixer
- Judith Barrett as Good Mixer
- Neely Edwards as Good Mixer
- Marjorie Zier as Good Mixer
- Rita La Roy as Good Mixer
- Tyler Brooke as The Life of the Party
- Clarence Burton as Police Officer
- Jim Farley as Death Row Police Officer
- Robert T. Haines as The Judge
- Douglas Scott as Bobby Smith
- Jane Keckley as Bobby's Mother
- Blanche Craig as Neighbor (Mrs. Johnson)
- Mary Gordon as Neighbor at Store
- Ynez Seabury as Neighbor (Mrs. Johnson's daughter)
- Scott Kolk as Radio Announcer
- Fred Walton as Doctor Rawlins
- Wade Boteler as Mine Foreman (uncredited)
- Randolph Scott as Coal Miner (uncredited)

== Production ==
Dynamite was DeMille's first full-length sound film (a silent version was also released simultaneously), and casting the right actors (with adequate voices) proved a difficult process. Development began on the heels of the release of his previous film, The Godless Girl, which had featured hastily added sound footage (now currently unavailable for viewing) and which had been a box-office disappointment.

Numerous actors were screen-tested by assistant Mitchell Leisen by December 18, 1928, and apart from Ricardo Cortez and Monte Blue, most of them were B-movie actors. Male actors tested but passed over included Buck Jones, Bob Custer, Jason Robards, Sr., Guinn "Big Boy" Williams, Dean Jagger and Randolph Scott. Actresses tested but passed over included Carmelita Geraghty, Merna Kennedy, Leila Hyams, Dorothy Burgess and Sally Blane. His final selections were Charles Bickford and Kay Johnson, primarily known for their stage work. Leisen reportedly tried to interest DeMille in up-and-coming Carole Lombard for Johnson's role; allegedly, she can be glimpsed in the surviving versions of the film.

Filming of Dynamite began on January 29, 1929, and lasted until April 30. Scenes for the silent version were shot beginning on May 28 and ending on June 5. Charles Bickford would later describe the script as "'a mess of corn' with terrible dialogue."

Dorothy Parker, who was living in Los Angeles at the time, was commandeered to pen the lyrics for an original song for Dynamite. Her third try, titled "How Am I To Know", and set to music by Jack King, was accepted and featured in the film's prison sequence; after that introduction into the film, the music is used in a foxtrot form by a pianist in an impromptu party given at Johnson's home just after Bickford arrives there (and is hustled out of sight of the guests), a subsequent sequence in the mining town where Johnson teaches Bickford to dance (and they almost kiss) to music coming from Bickford's radio, and also under the film's "The End" credit.

== Reception ==
The New York Times reviewer Mordaunt Hall had mixed feelings about DeMille's first talkie, calling it "an astonishing mixture, with artificiality vying with realism and comedy hanging on the heels of grim melodrama." "Even in the work of the performers, there are moments when they are human beings and then, at times, they become nothing more than Mr. De Mille's puppets", "behaving strangely and conversing in movie epigrams". Nonetheless, Hall approved of the efforts of Johnson ("an accomplished actress") and Bickford ("a splendid performance"), though he could not say the same of Nagel ("does not act up to his usual standard").

=== Censorship ===
The Commonwealth Film Censorship Board refused to permit the film to be released in Australia, a decision upheld by the Censor Appeals Board. At the time, approximately half of all foreign films that were submitted were rejected by the Board.

== See also ==
- List of early sound feature films (1926–1929)
