= I Married a Doctor =

1936 film by Archie Mayo

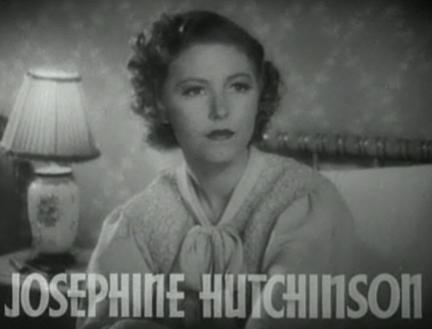
- Josephine Hutchinson in I Married a Doctor
- Directed by: Archie Mayo
- Screenplay by: Casey Robinson
- Based on: Main Street by Sinclair Lewis
- Produced by: Hal B. Wallis
- Starring: Pat O'Brien; Josephine Hutchinson; Ross Alexander; Guy Kibbee; Louise Fazenda; Olin Howland
- Cinematography: Byron Haskin
- Edited by: Owen Marks
- Music by: Heinz Roemheld
- Production company: First National Pictures
- Distributed by: Warner Bros. Pictures
- Release date: April 25, 1936
- Running time: 83 minutes
- Country: United States
- Language: English

I Married a Doctor is a 1936 American drama film directed by Archie Mayo and written by Casey Robinson. It is an adaptation of Sinclair Lewis’s 1920 novel Main Street. The film stars Pat O'Brien, Josephine Hutchinson, Ross Alexander, Guy Kibbee, Louise Fazenda and Olin Howland. The film was released by Warner Bros. Pictures on April 25, 1936.

== Plot ==
When small town doctor Will P. Kennicott marries Carol, a Chicago woman, the townspeople are displeased that he has married an outsider. Carol is determined to make friends, but the town's women resent her popularity with the men. She further alienates everyone with her suggestions on how to fix up the town, which they all think looks fine the way it is. She befriends Erik Valborg, a young man with artistic inclinations. In a gesture of support, she encourages him to leave the farm and study architecture in the city. His parents are convinced that she has seduced him. Erik, himself, is sure that Carol is in love with him and says as much to Will. At Will's suggestion, Erik asks Carol to leave with him. She is stunned, admitting that she sees him only as a friend. In despair, Erik gets drunk and is killed in a car crash. When Carol realizes that the whole town blames her for Erik's death, she decides to leave. All her efforts to fit in have failed, and although Will begs her to stay, she takes the next train out of town. After she is gone, the townspeople hypocritically claim to miss her. Will is so sure that she will come back that he waits every afternoon for the train from the city. One afternoon, Carol does return, having learned that there are small minds everywhere and that her love for Will is what is important.

== Cast ==
- Pat O'Brien as Dr. William P. Kennicott
- Josephine Hutchinson as Carol Kennicott
- Ross Alexander as Erik Valborg
- Guy Kibbee as Samuel Clark
- Louise Fazenda as Bea Sorenson
- Olin Howland as Dave Dyer
- Margaret Irving as Maude Dyer
- Alma Lloyd as Fern Winters
- Grace Stafford as Vera Sherwin
- Ray Mayer as Miles Bjornstam
- Robert Barrat as Nels Valborg
- Hedwiga Reicher as Bessie Valborg
- Willard Robertson as Guy Pollock
- Edythe Elliott as Mrs. Clark
- Thomas Pogue as Reverend Champ Perry
- Janet Young as Dolly Perry
- Harry Hayden as Prof. George Mott
- Frank Rhodes as Ezra Stowbody
- Fay Holden as Ella Stowbody
- Sam Wren as 'Chet' Sashaway
- Dora Clement as Mrs. Jackson Elder
- George 'Gabby' Hayes as Train Station Agent
