= Public Enemy's Wife =

1936 film by Nick Grinde

- Theatrical release poster
- Directed by: Nick Grinde
- Screenplay by: Abem Finkel; Harold Buckley
- Story by: P.J. Wolfson
- Produced by: Samuel Bischoff
- Starring: Pat O'Brien; Margaret Lindsay; Robert Armstrong; Cesar Romero; Dick Foran; Joe King
- Cinematography: Ernest Haller
- Edited by: Thomas Pratt
- Production company: Warner Bros. Pictures
- Distributed by: Warner Bros. Pictures
- Release date: July 25, 1936
- Running time: 69 minutes
- Country: United States
- Language: English

Public Enemy's Wife is a 1936 American crime film directed by Nick Grinde and written by Abem Finkel and Harold Buckley. The film stars Pat O'Brien, Margaret Lindsay, Robert Armstrong, Cesar Romero, Dick Foran and Joe King. The film was released by Warner Bros. Pictures on July 25, 1936.

== Cast ==
- Pat O'Brien as Lee Laird
- Margaret Lindsay as Judith Roberts Maroc
- Robert Armstrong as Gene Ferguson
- Cesar Romero as Gene Maroc
- Dick Foran as Thomas Duncan McKay
- Joe King as Wilcox
- Dick Purcell as Louie
- Addison Richards as Warden Williams
- Hal K. Dawson as Daugherty
- Harry Hayden as Justice of the Peace
- Al Bridge as Swartzman
- Kenneth Harlan as G-Man
- Selmer Jackson as Duffield
- William Pawley as Correlli
