= Companionate Marriage =

1928 film

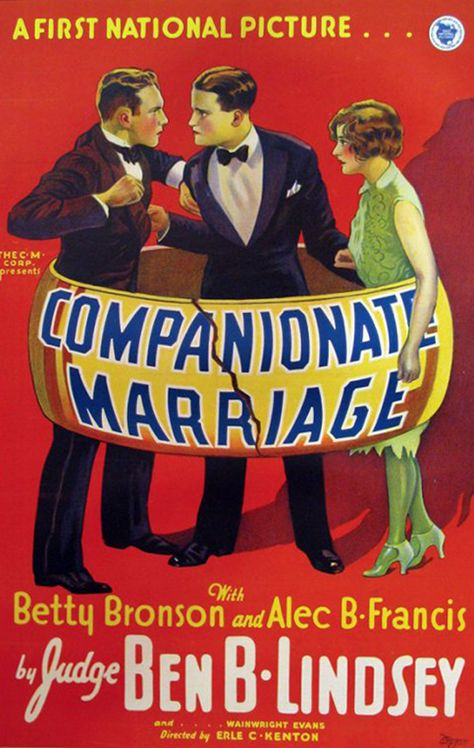
- Theatrical release poster
- Directed by: Erle C. Kenton
- Written by: Beatrice Van; Casey Robinson (intertitles)
- Screenplay by: Wainwright Evans; Ben B. Lindsey
- Based on: Companionate Marriage by Wainwright Evans and Ben B. Lindsey
- Produced by: Edward Small; Sam Sax
- Starring: Betty Bronson
- Cinematography: Ray June
- Edited by: W. Donn Hayes
- Production companies: Gotham Productions; Sam Sax; CM Corporation; Asher Small Rogers
- Distributed by: First National Pictures
- Release date: October 21, 1928
- Running time: 70 minutes
- Country: United States
- Language: Silent (English intertitles)

Companionate Marriage is a 1928 American silent drama film directed by Erle C. Kenton and starring Betty Bronson. The film was produced by Sam Sax of Gotham Productions and acquired by First National Pictures for distribution only. This explains why the film at this late date was completely silent as by this time First National was routinely supplying synchronized musical soundtracks to its feature films.

The film was a collaboration between the company of Asher Small Rogers and Sam Sax. It was banned by the New York State Censor.

The title phrase had received great attention the previous year, with the publication of Ben B. Lindsey's book The Companionate Marriage.

== Plot ==
In a cramped and emotionally exhausted courtroom, Judge Meredith presides over a family case that mirrors the heartbreak of so many like it—Mr. Williams, once a devoted father, now stands accused of abandoning his family. His wife sits silently beside their children, aged by hardship and sorrow. With measured sternness and a flicker of compassion, the Judge warns Williams: one more flight from duty, and a jail sentence awaits.

Amid this wreckage stands the eldest daughter, Sally Williams, whose bright eyes belie a guarded heart. Sensitive and observant, she has come to view marriage not as a hopeful union but as a snare of poverty and disillusionment. Her job as secretary to wealthy businessman James Moore offers a window into a more elegant world—but even here, she sees duplicity, as Moore maintains a discreet liaison outside his marriage to Mrs. Moore. These experiences only deepen Sally’s skepticism toward love and marriage.

One heart still dares to hope. Donald Moore, James's idealistic son, is smitten with Sally. Though he courts her gently and with sincerity, Sally keeps her distance, unsure whether any romantic dream is worth the inevitable fall.

That illusion is shattered further when Sally is invited to a party at the Moore home. There, she meets Ruth Moore, Donald’s spirited sister, and her latest beau, Tommy Van Cleve, a fast-living, reckless flirt who immediately sets his sights on Sally. When rebuffed, he redirects his charm back to Ruth, coaxing her into a whirlwind escapade.

In a haze of jazz, champagne, and spontaneity, Ruth and Tommy drive to the infamous Lakeside Café, where a revue called "The Jazz Bride" is underway. Emboldened by drink and the thrill of rebellion, they agree to get married live on stage—a joke for the crowd, a tragedy in the making.

Reality sets in the next morning. Ruth tries to smile through her disappointment, while Tommy grows restless. The illusion of happiness crumbles when he announces that he can no longer endure married life and walks out. Ruth, shattered, discovers she is pregnant. Alone and terrified, she bolts—taking the car and speeding toward nowhere.

Donald follows, desperate to stop his sister. But as Ruth’s car nears a bridge, it veers wildly, smashes through the railing, and plunges into the river below. Donald leaps in after her, pulling her unconscious body from the wreckage. Firemen labor with a pulmotor in a backroom of the very café where her nightmare began—but Ruth is gone.

Overwhelmed with grief and anger, Donald denounces the institution of marriage, calling it a lie that ruins lives. Sally, witnessing his anguish, finds herself moved to compassion—and a bold resolution. If love and marriage are ever to be redeemed, she must lead the way. She proposes a marriage to Donald—not based on illusion, but on mutual understanding, guided by the wisdom of Judge Meredith.

With the Judge’s help, they draw up a marital pact: if, after a set period, they are not truly and joyfully in accord, their marriage will be dissolved—no bitterness, no shame.

Years pass. We return to find Sally and Donald now truly united, their bond no longer speculative, but built on trust, empathy, and affection. They have transcended youthful doubt and romantic delusion. In their arms sleeps a baby boy—a symbol of hope, healing, and the promise that a compassionate marriage, built not on fantasy but on love’s deeper truths, can endure.

== Cast ==
- Betty Bronson as Sally Williams
- Alec B. Francis as Judge Meredith
- William Welsh as Mr. Williams
- Edward Martindel as James Moore
- Sarah Padden as Mrs. Williams
- Hedda Hopper as Mrs. Moore
- Richard Walling as Donald Moore
- Arthur Rankin as Tommy Van Cleve
- June Nash as Ruth Moore

== Preservation ==
With no prints of Companionate Marriage located in any film archives, it is a lost film.
