= Song of the Saddle =

1936 film by Louis King

- Directed by: Louis King
- Written by: William Jacobs
- Distributed by: Warner Bros. Pictures
- Release date: February 28, 1936
- Running time: 58 minutes
- Country: United States
- Language: English

Song of the Saddle is a 1936 American Western film starring Dick Foran, Alma Lloyd, Charles Middleton, and featuring an uncredited Sons of the Pioneers with Roy Rogers.

== Plot ==
In 1850, a land rush is on as the U.S. government has opened lands for settlement in the Arapaho Indian nation. Phineas Hook establishes his claim to land for a new town by shooting and killing a man who stakes his claim first. Five years later, with the town well established and Hook as a corrupt stage line boss, Frank Wilson and his son, Frank Jr., stop on their way to California to sell some of their goods in order to further finance their trip. Frank Jr. has a talent for singing and Hook dubs him "The Singing Kid." Hook buys some of Wilson's goods but tells Wilson to return to Ohio for more goods to purchase. Hook's henchmen, dressed as Indians, ambush Wilson's wagon, kill him, burn the wagon and steal his money. Frank Jr. escapes.

Ten years later, Frank Jr., now an adult, returns as "The Singing Kid" for revenge and holds up one of Hook's stage lines. The Kid then intervenes to stop the lynching of three innocent men from being hanged by Hook as cattle rustlers. The Kid ties up Hook and his gang and, though masked, the Kid reminds Hook of Frank Sr.'s murder and reveals his identity. Hook offers a $1,000 reward for the Kid. The three alleged rustlers, Curley, Little Casino and Jose assist the Kid with his mission.

The Kid is attracted to Jen Coburn, whom he had met when she was a girl during his first trip to town as a boy. The Kid attends a social at the Coburn ranch and when he sings a song to impress Jen, Hook and his gang discover his identity and force him at gunpoint to return to the marshal for arrest. En route, the Kid escapes and returns to Jen to explain who he is and that he returned to get even with Hook. Jake Bannion, one of Hook's gang, attempts to shoot the Kid, but is captured by Curley, Little Casino and Jose. They set up Jake by allowing him to escape on the Kid's horse which results in Hook mistakenly shooting Jake, thinking he is the Kid. Hook sends the marshal after the Kid at Coburn's ranch. Mr. Coburn explains to the marshal that Hook killed the Kid's father but there is no evidence of it. He also tells the marshal that Hook is corrupt and the Kid could do the town a lot of good.

The Kid sends a message that he will meet with Hook. Curley, Little Casino and Jake pose as bounty hunters who have captured the Kid and agree to turn him over to Hook in exchange for the reward money. When Hook's henchman, Simon Bannion (Jake's brother) enters Hook's office to make the exchange, Hook shoots him dead believing he is the Kid coming at the appointed time. Hook then hires another singing cowboy to pose as the Kid. However, the Kid and Jose learn of Hook's plan to rob the mail stage and frame the Kid for the robbery. When Hook goes to report the Kid's robbery, he is surprised the marshal already has the Kid and his pals in custody. The marshal, now in cahoots with the Kid, tells Hook the Kid was in custody an hour before the mail stage was robbed, and implicates Hook. Hooks shoots and wounds the marshal and escapes on a stagecoach. The marshal frees the Kid who chases after Hook. The Kid catches up to the stage and as he engages the driver in a fight on the roof, the wagon hitch disengages. The Kid jumps off, but the stage, with Hook inside, plummets down a ravine killing Hook. The Kid promises to return the money he stole in the initial stage robbery to the town, and his entourage with Jen accompanying him, head for California as the Kid sings "Underneath A Western Sky."

== Cast ==
- Dick Foran - Frank Wilson Jr. as The Singing Kid
- Alma Lloyd - Jen Coburn
- Charles Middleton - Phineas P. Hook
- Addison Richards - Frank Wilson Sr.
- Eddie Shubert - Jake Bannion
- George Ernest - Frank "Frankie" Wilson Jr., as a child
- Monte Montague - Simon Bannion
- Victor Potel - Little Casino
- Kenneth Harlan - Marshall Bill Graves
- Myrtle Stedman - Mrs. Coburn (as Myrtle Stedman)
- Pat West - Curley
- James Farley - Tom Coburn
- Bud Osborne - Porter (as Bud Osborne)
- Julian Rivero - José
- Bonita Granville - Jen, as a child
- William Desmond - Stage Driver Tim
