= June Nash (actress) =

American actress (1911–1979)

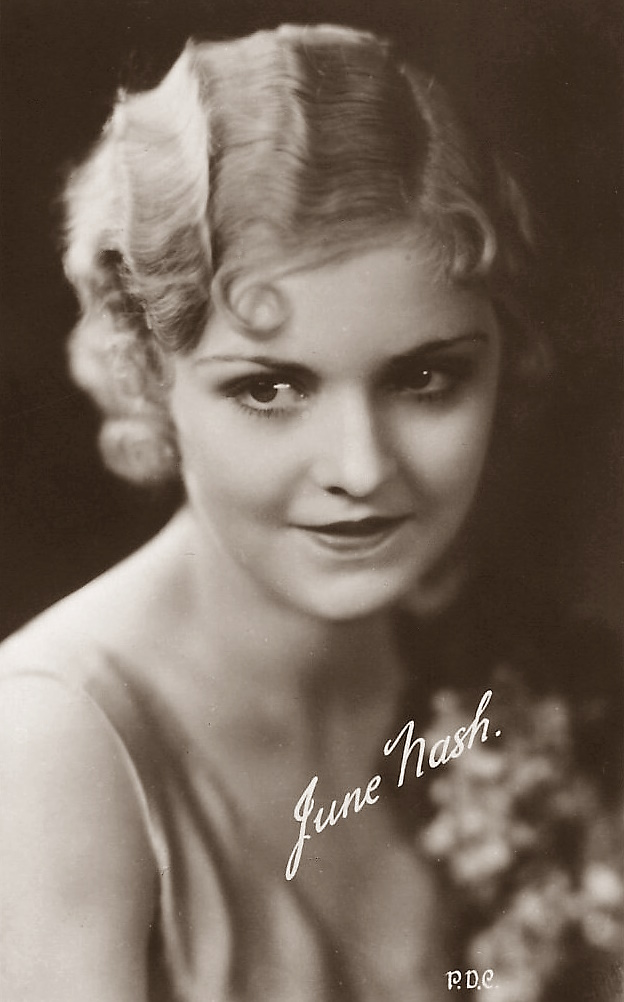
- Nash in the 1929 film Strange Cargo
- Born: January 26, 1911; New York, U.S.
- Died: October 8, 1979 (aged 68); Hampton Bays, New York, U.S.
- Occupation: Film actress
- Years active: 1928–1932

June Nash (January 26, 1911 – October 8, 1979) was an American film actress.

Nash started her film career in Frank Capra's Say It with Sables in 1928. In 1929, Nash played the lead role of "Ruth" in the mystery film Strange Cargo. Her last film appearance was in the film Two Kinds of Women, in 1932.

Nash died in October 1979 in Hampton Bays, New York, at the age of 68.

== Filmography ==
=== Film ===
Year	Title	Role	Notes
1928	Say It with Sables	Marie Caswell	
1928	Companionate Marriage	Ruth Moore	
1929	Daughters of Desire		
1929	Strange Cargo	Ruth	
1929	Dynamite	Good Mixer	uncredited
1929	Their Own Desire	Mildred	
1930	Madam Satan	Undetermined Secondary Role	uncredited
1932	Two Kinds of Women	Ms. Bowen	uncredited
