= Thomas Lourds =

Book series by Charles Brokaw

Thomas Lourds (novel series)
- The Atlantis Code; The Lucifer Code; The Temple Mount Code; The Oracle Code
- Author: Charles Brokaw
- Country: United States
- Language: English
- Genre: Thriller, Mystery, Suspense
- Publisher: Forge Books
- Published: 2009 - current
- Media type: Print

Thomas Lourds is a book series by author Charles Brokaw, focusing on the title character of anthropologist and linguist Thomas Lourds.

== Plot overview ==
The series follows Thomas Lourds as he is thrust into several situations concerning religious historical secrets centering on ancient artifacts.

== Books ==
- The Atlantis Code, 2009
- The Lucifer Code, 2010
- The Temple Mount Code, 2011
- The Oracle Code, 2013

== Reception ==
Critical reception for the Thomas Lourds series has been mixed, with Publishers Weekly saying that The Atlantis Code "will get few readers' pulses racing, especially since Brokaw relies more on shoot-outs and narrow escapes than plausible archeological details to carry his story along." Of The Atlantis Code, Kirkus Reviews wrote "Despite the lumbering pace, by-the-numbers descriptions and a surfeit of chase scenes, Brokaw holds readers until the last stone is turned."

The Seattle PI praised The Lucifer Code, calling it "a fun rollercoaster ride".

Of The Temple Mount Code, Kirkus gave the novel a mixed review, saying it was "derivative but entertaining escapist fare". The Journal Star praised the book, calling it "a sophisticated Indiana Jones".
