= Dick Foran =

American actor (1910–1979)

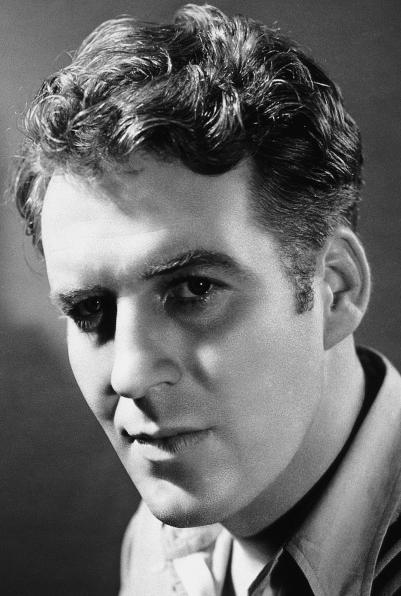
- Foran in Heart of the North (1938)
- Born: John Nicholas Foran; June 18, 1910; Flemington, New Jersey, U.S.
- Died: August 10, 1979 (aged 69); Panorama City, California, U.S.
- Resting place: San Fernando Mission Cemetery, Los Angeles, California, U.S.
- Other name: Nick Foran
- Occupations: Actor, singer
- Years active: 1934–1969
- Spouses: Ruth Piper Hollingsworth (m. 1937; div. 1940) Carole Gallagher (m. 1943; div. 1945) Susanne Rosser (m. 1951)
- Children: 4

John Nicholas "Dick" Foran (June 18, 1910 – August 10, 1979) was an American actor and singer, known for his performances in Western musicals and for playing supporting roles in dramatic pictures. He appeared in dozens of movies of every type during his lengthy career, often with top stars leading the cast.

== Early years ==
Foran was born in Flemington, New Jersey, the first of five sons to Arthur F. Foran and Elizabeth Foran. His father was a Republican member of the New Jersey Senate, as was Dick Foran's younger brother, Walter E. Foran.

He attended Mercersburg Academy, where he competed on the track team under Scots-American athletics coach Jimmy Curran. After graduation he attended the Hun School, a college preparatory school in nearby Princeton, and then enrolled at Princeton University, pursuing a degree in geology. He played on the football team while taking courses in the arts, where he developed an interest in the theater.

Foran studied music at the Leibling Studio in New York before singing on radio. As Nick Foran, he went on to become a lead singer with a band and later formed his own orchestra.

== Film ==
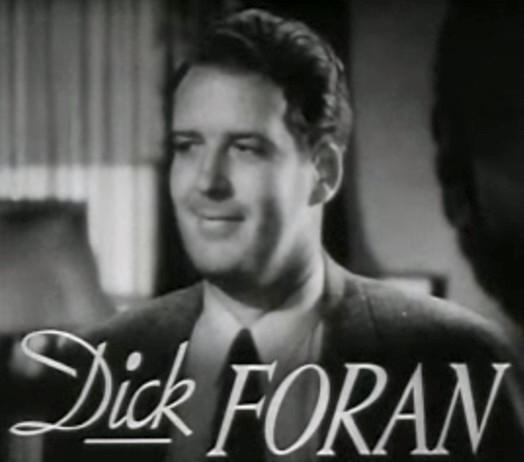
Four Daughters (1938)

Foran was still billed as Nick Foran when he signed a contract with Fox in 1934. In 1935, Foran, who stood 6-foot-2 and had red hair, could also sing when called upon in films such as Change of Heart (1934) with Janet Gaynor. His handsome appearance and good-natured personality made him a natural choice for the supporting cast.

Fox didn't pick up Foran's contract option, and he was released after one year. He was soon signed by Warner Bros., which changed his name to Dick Foran and cast him as a singing cowboy, to compete with the successful Gene Autry musical westerns. His first starring role was in Moonlight on the Prairie (1935). His other singing-cowboy features included Song of the Saddle (1936), Guns of the Pecos (1937), and Empty Holsters (1937); some of these were remakes of earlier Warner westerns starring John Wayne.

Foran also appeared as a character actor in Warners' important films, like The Petrified Forest (1936) with Bette Davis and Humphrey Bogart, The Sisters (1938) with Errol Flynn and Bette Davis, and Boy Meets Girl (1938) and The Fighting 69th (1940), both with James Cagney and Pat O'Brien.

In 1940, Foran moved to Universal Studios, where he acted in many different genres of film from horror to comedy, such as My Little Chickadee (1940) with Mae West and W.C. Fields; Keep 'Em Flying (1941) In The Navy (1941) and Ride 'Em Cowboy (1942), all three with Abbott and Costello; Private Buckaroo with Harry James, the Andrews Sisters, and Shemp Howard; and The Mummy's Hand (1940) with Tom Tyler as the Mummy. Foran reprised the same role in the sequel The Mummy's Tomb (1942), this time with Lon Chaney Jr. as the Mummy. He also starred in the studio's western serials Winners of the West (1940) and Riders of Death Valley (1941).

One of his last film roles was a small one in Donovan's Reef (1963), starring his longtime friend John Wayne and Lee Marvin. His final film appearance was as the prospector "Old Timer" in the sentimental film Brighty of the Grand Canyon (1967) with Joseph Cotten, Pat Conway, and Karl Swenson.

== Stage ==
Foran left Universal in 1943 to star on Broadway in the Rodgers and Hart musical comedy A Connecticut Yankee, based on Mark Twain's A Connecticut Yankee in King Arthur's Court.

== Television ==
In 1954, Foran guest-starred on NBC's Justice, a legal drama starring Dane Clark and Gary Merrill, on CBS's The Public Defender starring Reed Hadley and Hugh Beaumont, and on NBC's The Martha Raye Show, a comedy/variety show.

Foran appeared in at least four episodes of Science Fiction Theatre (1955). One of these, "The Miracle Hour", aired December 22, 1956. Foran appeared three times (1955–1956) as Father Brophy on the ABC anthology series Crossroads. He guest-starred in the syndicated crime drama Sheriff of Cochise starring John Bromfield. He also appeared as Burt, a carnival hustler, in 1957 on NBC's Father Knows Best with Robert Young.

Foran was prominently featured as a sheriff in the episode "The Third Rider" in the first season (1957) of the ABC/Warner Bros. Western series Maverick starring Jack Kelly as Bart Maverick, the brother of James Garner's character Bret Maverick. He also portrayed Tuck Degan in the 1957 episode "Final Payment" of another ABC/WB Western series, Colt .45 starring Wayde Preston.

In the January 1959 episode "The Spurs", he portrayed Sheriff Wilkes on Wanted Dead or Alive starring Steve McQueen. He made another guest appearance in the December 1960 episode: "The Choice", portraying aging bounty hunter Frank Koster. Also in 1959, Foran portrayed defendant Dr. David Craig on CBS's Perry Mason in the episode "The Case of the Bedeviled Doctor". Later that year, he played defendant Steve Benton in another Perry Mason episode, "The Case of the Garrulous Gambler". He was also featured as Perry Mason's client in the 1961 episode "The Case of the Renegade Refugee". In 1959, Foran was cast as David Steele in the episode "The Adjuster" of the NBC crime drama series Richard Diamond, Private Detective, starring David Janssen. Dabbs Greer and DeForest Kelley also appeared in this episode.

In 1962, Foran appeared with Marie Windsor in the roles of Frank and Ann Jesse in the episode "The Wanted Man" of the ABC/WB Western series Lawman, starring John Russell as Marshal Dan Troop.

Foran later appeared as Gabriel Marion, brother of title character Francis Marion (Leslie Nielsen), in the Walt Disney Presents miniseries The Swamp Fox. In 1965–1966, he had his only regular role on a TV series playing "Slim" on O.K. Crackerby!. In 1968, Foran was cast in the role of "Fred Haines" in season one, episode 13, of the NBC television series Adam-12.

== Death ==
On August 10, 1979, Foran died aged 69 of respiratory ailments and pneumonia in Burbank, California. He was buried in the San Fernando Mission Cemetery.

== Recognition ==
Foran has a star on the Hollywood Walk of Fame for his contribution to television, at 1600 Vine Street. It was dedicated on February 8, 1960.

== Selected filmography ==
- Stand Up and Cheer! (1934) as Nick Foran
- Change of Heart (1934) as Nick
- Student Tour (1934) as Assistant Manager (uncredited)
- Gentlemen Are Born (1934) as Smudge Casey
- The Lottery Lover (1935) as Cadet
- One More Spring (1935) as Park Policeman
- It's a Small World (1935) as Cop
- Farmer Takes a Wife (1935) as Walt Lansing (uncredited)
- Accent of Youth (1935) as Butch
- Ladies Love Danger (1935) as Sergeant Bender
- Shipmates Forever (1935) as Gifford
- Moonlight on the Prairie (1935) as Ace Andrews
- Dangerous (1935) as Teddy
- The Petrified Forest (1936) as Boze Hertzlinger
- Song of the Saddle (1936) as Frank Wilson Jr. aka The Singing Kid
- Treachery Rides the Range (1936) as Captain Red Taylor
- The Golden Arrow (1936) as Tommy Blake
- The Big Noise (1936) as Don Andrews
- Public Enemy's Wife (1936) as Thomas Duncan McKay
- Earthworm Tractors (1936) as Emmet McManus
- Trailin' West (1936) as Lieutenant Red Colton
- California Mail (1936) as Bill Harkins
- Guns of the Pecos (1937) as Steve Ainslee
- Black Legion (1937) as Ed Jackson
- Land Beyond the Law (1937) as John 'Chip' Douglas Jr.
- The Cherokee Strip (1937) as Dick Hudson
- Blazing Sixes (1937) as Red Barton
- Empty Holsters (1937) as Clay Brent
- The Devil's Saddle Legion (1937) as Tal Holladay
- Prairie Thunder (1937) as Rod Farrell
- The Perfect Specimen (1937) as Jink Carter
- She Loved a Fireman (1937) as James 'Red' Tyler
- Love, Honor and Behave (1938) as Pete Martin
- Over the Wall (1938) as Jerry Davis
- Cowboy from Brooklyn (1938) as Sam Thorne
- Four Daughters (1938) as Ernest
- Boy Meets Girl (1938) as Larry Toms
- The Sisters (1938) as Tom Knivel
- Secrets of a Nurse (1938) as Lee Burke
- Heart of the North (1938) as Sergeant Alan Baker
- Inside Information (1939) as Danny Blake
- Daughters Courageous (1939) as Eddie Moore
- I Stole a Million (1939) as Paul Carver
- Hero for a Day (1939) as Brainy Thornton
- Private Detective (1939) as Jim Rickey
- Four Wives (1939) as Ernest Talbot
- The Fighting 69th (1940) as Lt. 'Long John' Wynn
- My Little Chickadee (1940) as Wayne Carter
- The House of Seven Gables (1940) as Matthew Holgrave
- Winners of the West (1940, Serial) as Jeff Ramsay
- Rangers of Fortune (1940) as Johnny Cash
- The Mummy's Hand (1940) as Steve Banning
- Four Mothers (1941) as Ernest Talbot
- Horror Island (1941) as Bill Martin
- In the Navy (1941) as Dynamite Dugan
- Riders of Death Valley (1941) as Jim Benton
- Unfinished Business (1941) as Frank
- The Kid from Kansas (1941) as Kansas
- Mob Town (1941) as Sgt. Frank Conroy
- Keep 'Em Flying (1941) as Jinx Roberts
- Road Agent (1941) as Duke Masters
- Ride 'Em Cowboy (1942) as Bronco Bob Mitchell
- Butch Minds the Baby (1942) as Dennis Devlin
- Private Buckaroo (1942) as Lon Prentice
- The Mummy's Tomb (1942) as Stephen Banning
- Behind the Eight Ball (1942) as Bill Edwards
- Hi, Buddy (1943) as Dave O'Connor
- He's My Guy (1943) as Van Moore
- Guest Wife (1945) as Christopher Price
- Easy Come, Easy Go (1947) as Dale Whipple
- Fort Apache (1948) as Sgt. Quincannon
- El Paso (1949) as Sheriff La Farge
- Deputy Marshall (1949) as Joel Benton / Jed Northey
- Al Jennings of Oklahoma (1951) as Frank Jennings
- Treasure of Ruby Hills (1955) as Alan Doran
- Please Murder Me (1956) as Joe Leeds
- Sierra Stranger (1957) as Bert Gaines
- Chicago Confidential (1957) as Arthur 'Artie' Blane
- Violent Road (aka Hell's Highway) (1958) as Frank 'Sarge' Miller
- Thundering Jets (1958) as Lt. Col. Henry Spalding
- The Fearmakers (1958) as Jim McGinnis
- The Atomic Submarine (1959) as Cmdr. Dan Wendover
- The Big Night (1960) as Ed
- Studs Lonigan (1960) as Patrick Lonigan
- Lassie as the fire chief Ed Washburne (TV series, 7 episodes, 1961–64)
- Donovan's Reef (1963) as Australian Navy Officer Sean O'Brien
- Taggart (1964) as Adam Stark
- Brighty of the Grand Canyon (1966) as Old Timer, the Prospector

== Selected television ==
Year	Title	Role	Notes
1956	Science Fiction Theater	Various roles	Episodes "The Long Sleep", "The Missing Waveband", "Death at My Fingertips", "The Miracle Hour"
1962	Death Valley Days	Ferguson	Episode "The Breaking Point"
1958	Have Gun - Will Travel	Roy Calvert	Episode "Young Gun"
1963	Death Valley Days	Doc Hutchins	Episode "Pioneer Doctor"
1963	Death Valley Days	Bill Franklin	Episode "The Holy Terror"
1964	Death Valley Days	Bannerman	Episode "See the Elephant and Hear the Owl"
1965	Death Valley Days	Will Melville	Episode "Kate Melville and the Law"
1959	Wanted Dead or Alive	Sheriff D. Wilkes	Episode "The Spurs"
1960	Wanted Dead or Alive	Frank Koster	Episode "The Choice"
1969	Mayberry RFD	King Beaumont	Episode "Palm Springs Cowboy"
