= Helene Millard =

American actress

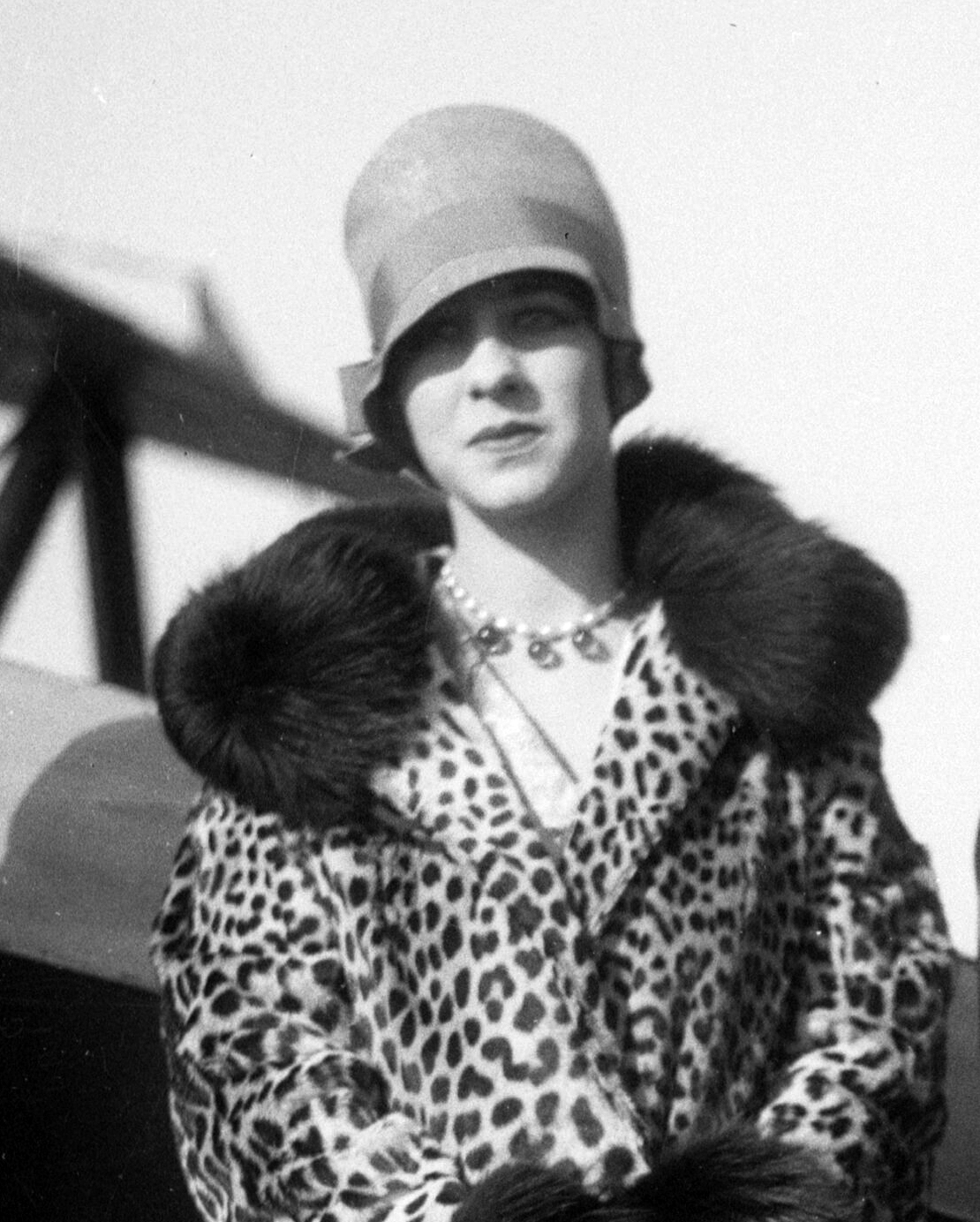
- Millard, c. 1927
- Born: September 30, 1905; Minneapolis, Minnesota, U.S.
- Died: September 20, 1974 (aged 68); Laguna Hills, California, U.S.
- Occupation: Actress
- Years active: 1929–1953
- Spouses: Joseph Ward; Harold Spielman

Helene Millard (September 30, 1905 – September 20, 1974) was an American supporting actress of the 1930s and 1940s.

Millard began acting on stage in Los Angeles when she was in the seventh grade.

Millard left the Pasadena Players in July 1926 to go to Denver, where she had a one-year contract to perform with the Wilkes Stock Company. In 1928–29, Millard acted for six months with the Henry Duffy Players in the northwestern United States, after which she went to Los Angeles to co-star in The Hottentot. On Broadway, Millard portrayed Sybil Weyman in A Roman Servant (1934).

She started her film career in a featured role in 1929's The Thirteenth Chair. During the 1930s, she appeared in 18 films, mostly in supporting or featured roles, but her roles diminished near the end of the decade. She made six films at the beginning of the 1940s, all in supporting roles, after which she left the film industry in 1942. She returned to films briefly in 1952–53, when she made four more films, before leaving the film industry for good. Her final film appearance was in a small role in Remains to Be Seen (1953), starring June Allyson and Van Johnson.

During the early 1950s, Millard appeared in several television shows before retiring for good in 1954 after an appearance on Topper. She died on September 20, 1974, in Laguna Hills, California.

== Filmography ==
(Per AFI database)

- Their Own Desire (1929)
- The Thirteenth Chair (1929)
- The Divorcee (1930)
- Lawful Larceny (1930)
- The Pay-Off (1930)
- Don't Bet on Women (1931)
- Doctors' Wives (1931)
- Ladies of the Jury (1932)
- False Faces (1932)
- Lady with a Past (1932)
- The Fourth Horseman (1932)
- By Whose Hand? (1932)
- Broadway Bill (1934)
- Desirable (1934)
- Break of Hearts (1935)
- My American Wife (1936)
- Her Husband Lies (1937)
- Change of Heart (1938)
- Letter of Introduction (1938)
- The Women (1939)
- The Night of Nights (1939)
- Sporting Blood (1940)
- Men Against the Sky (1940)
- The Biscuit Eater (1940)
- Nothing But the Truth (1941)
- Unfinished Business (1941)
- We Were Dancing (1942)
- And Now Tomorrow (1952)
- Young Man with Ideas (1952)
- The Clown (1953)
- Remains to Be Seen (1953)
