= Harold Robert Buckley =

American World War I flying ace

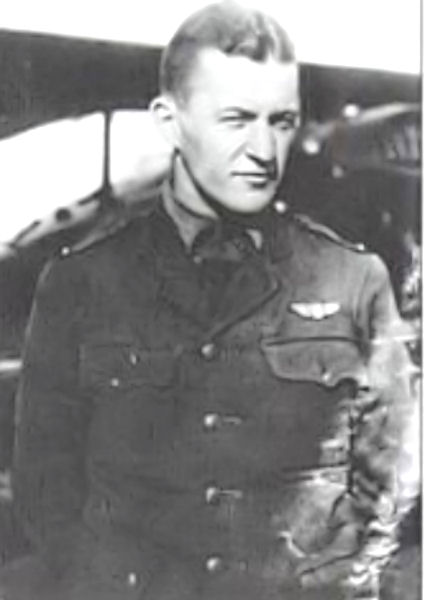
- Captain Harold Robert Buckley, 95th Aero Squadron
- Born: 4 April 1896; Westfield, Massachusetts, United States
- Died: 13 June 1958 (aged 62); Rigby, Idaho, US
- Military career
- Allegiance: United States
- Branch: United States Army Ambulance Service; Air Service, United States Army
- Service years: 1917 - 1918
- Rank: Captain
- Unit: Andover Ambulance Unit; Air Service, United States Army: 95th Aero Squadron
- Conflicts: World War I
- Awards: Distinguished Service Cross with Oak Leaf Cluster, French Croix de Guerre

Captain Harold Robert Buckley (4 April 1896 – 13 June 1958) was a World War I flying ace credited with five aerial victories.

== World War I service ==
Buckley was one of the American pilots who came to aviation via an ambulance service. Once in France, he joined the U.S. Army Air Service in Paris. He found himself assigned to the 95th Aero Squadron in March 1918. Between 30 May and 27 September 1918, he downed four enemy airplanes and an observation balloon.

== Post World War I ==
When the war ended, Buckley stayed in Paris. He wrote an unofficial history of the 95th Aero called Squadron 95 in 1933; fellow squadron member Lansing Holden illustrated it. The book has been in publication as recently as 1972.

== Honors and awards ==
Distinguished Service Cross (DSC)

The Distinguished Service Cross is presented to Harold Robert Buckley, First Lieutenant (Air Service), U.S. Army, for extraordinary heroism in action near Perle, France, August 10, 1918. Lieutenant Buckley was on a patrol protecting a French biplane observation machine, when they were suddenly set upon by six enemy planes. Lieutenant Buckley attacked and destroyed the nearest, and the remainder fled into their own territory. He then carried on with his mission until he had escorted the allied plane safely to its own aerodrome.

Distinguished Service Cross (DSC) Oak Leaf Cluster

The Distinguished Service Cross is presented to Harold Robert Buckley, First Lieutenant (Air Service), U.S. Army, for extraordinary heroism in action near Neville, France, and Boureuilles, France, September 16–27, 1918. Lieutenant Buckley dived through a violent and heavy antiaircraft and machine-gun fire and set on fire an enemy balloon that was being lowered to its nest. On the next day, while leading a patrol, he met and sent down in flames an enemy plane while it was engaged in reglage work.

== Writing career ==
Buckley wrote a variety of short stories and screenplays,

== See also ==
- List of World War I flying aces from the United States

== Bibliography ==
- Squadron 95. Obelisk Press, Paris 1933. Repr.: Arno Press, 1972. ISBN 0405037546, 9780405037542.
- American Aces of World War I. Norman Franks, Harry Dempsey. Osprey Publishing, 2001. ISBN 1-84176-375-6, ISBN 978-1-84176-375-0.
