= List of RKO Pictures films =

RKO Pictures (also known as RKO Productions, Radio Pictures, RKO Radio Pictures, and RKO Teleradio Pictures) is an American film production and distribution company. The original company produced films from 1929 through 1957, with releases extending until its dissolution in 1959. On October 23, 1928, RCA announced that it had acquired control of the Film Booking Offices of America studio and Keith-Albee-Orpheum theater chain and was merging them under a holding company, Radio-Keith-Orpheum Corp. Its new production arm was incorporated as RKO Productions Inc. on January 25, 1929. While RKO Distributing Corp. was originally organized as a distinct business entity, by July 1930 the studio was transitioning into the new, unified RKO Radio Pictures Inc. In December, RKO announced that it would be acquiring Pathé Exchange, including its studio and backlot in Culver City, film laboratories in New Jersey, distribution exchanges in the United States and Great Britain, and the Pathé News operation. In 1931–32, RKO Pathé operated as a semiautonomous division of RKO Pictures.

In the 1930s and 1940s, Hollywood's Golden Age, RKO was one of the Big Five studios. Its lineup of acting talent during this period included Cary Grant, Katharine Hepburn, Fred Astaire, Ginger Rogers, and Robert Mitchum. Among the studio's most notable films are Cimarron (winner of the 1931 Academy Award for Best Picture), King Kong (1933), Bringing Up Baby (1938), The Hunchback of Notre Dame (1939), The Best Years of Our Lives (1946—the studio's only other Academy Award for Best Picture), and what some people consider the greatest film of all time, 1941's Citizen Kane.

The studio declined after Howard Hughes acquired ownership in 1948, and it was sold to the General Tire and Rubber Company in 1955. After several years of attempting to save the company, in January 1957, General Tire reached an agreement with Universal Pictures, where Universal would distribute the remaining RKO product, but the agreement effectively ended all film production at RKO. In 1959, General Tire put all of its non-core operations in a holding company, RKO General, which in 1978 reconstituted RKO Pictures Inc. as a production subsidiary, although the new company did not release its first film until 1981. General Tire sold RKO Pictures in 1989, at which point it began operating under new management as a small independent film company, RKO Pictures LLC.

RKO Pictures was sold off to Concord's film and TV division in 2025 alongside the derivative rights to more than 5,000 titles. It will continue to operate as its own imprint under Concord Originals.

All release dates are from the AFI Database, except as follows: those designated with an (*) are from imdb.com, and those designated with a (**) are from Theiapolis.com; other sources are noted with footnotes. The date listed is the earliest date, whether that be the premiere or the general release date. The order is according to release dates in the United States.

Note: All films released by the original incarnation of RKO are now owned by Warner Bros. through Turner Entertainment Co. unless otherwise noted.

== 1929 ==
RKO's first year of production resulted in the release of 13 films, highlighted by Syncopation, The Vagabond Lover, and Rio Rita. Two previous films titled Come and Get It (February 3, 1929) and The Drifter (February 8, 1929) were listed by AFI as RKO productions, but the copyright claimant is RKO's precursor, F.B.O. Productions, Inc.

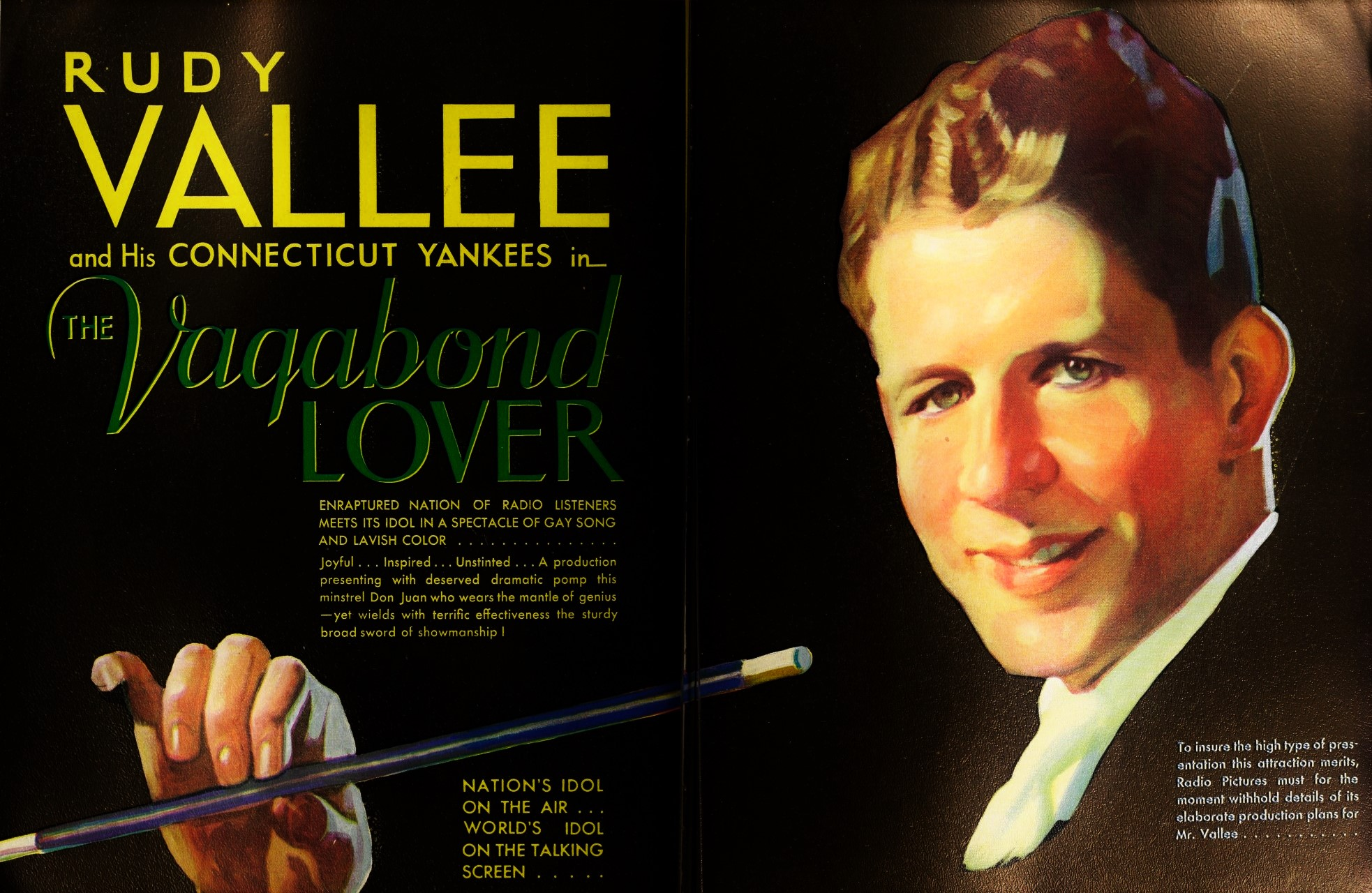
Advertisement for The Vagabond Lover

Release date	Film	Notes/References
March 24, 1929	Syncopation	First film released by RKO, but second produced
July 30, 1929	Street Girl	First film produced by RKO; premiered in New York City with wide release on August 21, 1929
August 10, 1929	Half Marriage	Premiered in New York City, wide release on October 13, 1929
August 24, 1929	The Very Idea	Premiered in New York City, wide release on September 15, 1929
September 8, 1929	Side Street	
September 15, 1929	Rio Rita	With Technicolor sequences
September 22, 1929	The Delightful Rogue	
October 27, 1929	Night Parade	
October 30, 1929	Jazz Heaven	Premiered in New York City, wide release on November 3, 1929
November 10, 1929	Tanned Legs	
November 26, 1929	The Vagabond Lover	First talking film for Rudy Vallee; premiered in New York City, wide release on December 1, 1929
December 14, 1929	Dance Hall	Premiered in New York City, wide release December 27, 1929
December 25, 1929	Seven Keys to Baldpate	Premiered in New York City, wide release on January 12, 1930

== The 1930s ==
The first full decade for the fledgling film studio was a mixture of large successes and deep instability, as the studio went through numerous management changes. The studio produced many classic films, such as Gunga Din, Cimarron (the first Western film to win the Academy Award for Best Picture, and only one of two RKO films to win that award), King Kong, Little Women, Anne of Green Gables, Top Hat, The Three Musketeers, Bringing Up Baby and The Hunchback of Notre Dame. During this decade, the studio owned the contracts of such notable talents as Cary Grant, Katharine Hepburn, Fred Astaire, Ginger Rogers, Mary Astor, Joel McCrea and Joan Fontaine, as well as off-screen talent such as Irving Berlin and John Ford. A major accomplishment for the studio came when they signed an exclusive distribution deal with Walt Disney Productions.

=== 1930 ===
The studio released 29 films that year, although there were no major critical or financial hits.

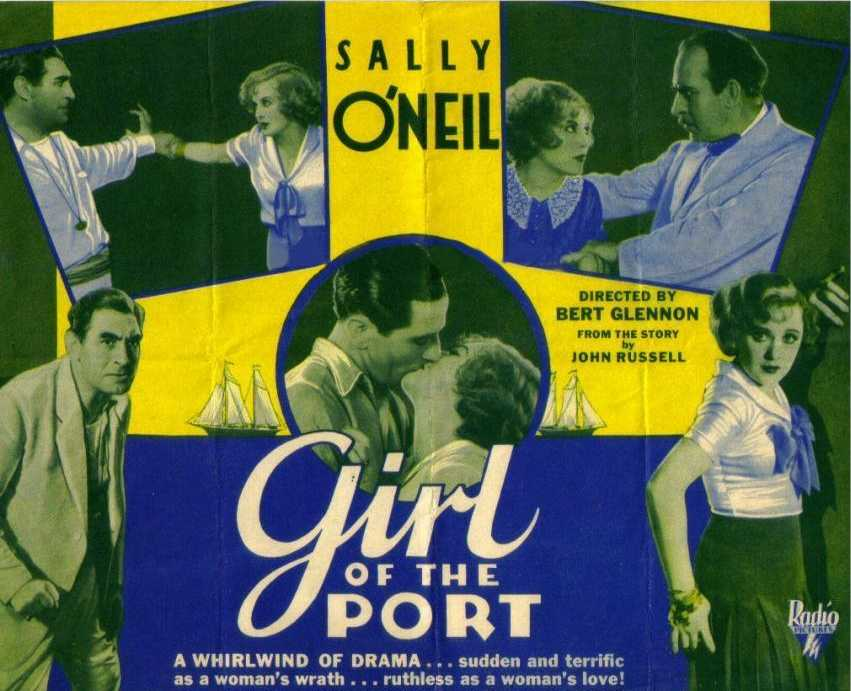
Theatrical poster for Girl of the Port

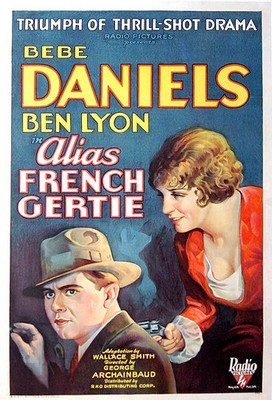
Theatrical poster for Alias French Gertie

Release date	Film	Notes
January 5, 1930	Love Comes Along	
January 14, 1930	Hit the Deck	With Technicolor sequences; premiered in New York, wide release on February 23, 1930
February 2, 1930	Girl of the Port	
February 9, 1930	Second Wife	
February 23, 1930	The Case of Sergeant Grischa	Oscar nomination for Best Sound Recording
March 2, 1930	Beau Bandit	
March 16, 1930	Framed	
March 21, 1930	Lovin' the Ladies	Premiered in New York City, wide release April 6, 1930
April 11, 1930	Alias French Gertie	Premiered in New York City, wide release April 20, 1930
April 18, 1930	He Knew Women	Premiered in New York City, wide release May 18, 1930
April 25, 1930	The Cuckoos	Premiered in New York City, wide release May 4, 1930
May 4, 1930	The Runaway Bride	
May 30, 1930	Midnight Mystery	Premiered in New York City, wide release May 1, 1930
June 15, 1930	The Fall Guy	
June 20, 1930	She's My Weakness	Premiered in New York City, wide release August 1, 1930
July 5, 1930	Inside the Lines	
July 11, 1930	Lawful Larceny	Premiered in New York City, wide release August 17, 1930
July 20, 1930	Shooting Straight	
August 1, 1930	Dixiana	With Technicolor sequences; currently in the public domain
August 10, 1930	Conspiracy	
September 1, 1930*	Escape	
September 12, 1930	Leathernecking	With Technicolor sequences; premiered in New York City, wide release September 22, 1930
October 4, 1930	Half Shot at Sunrise	
October 15, 1930	The Pay-Off	
October 24, 1930	The Silver Horde	Premiered in New York City, wide release on October 25, 1930
October 25, 1930	Check and Double Check	
November 10, 1930	Sin Takes a Holiday	Produced by Pathé; might have been released on November 20, 1930
November 15, 1930	Danger Lights	Premiered Chicago, wide release December 12, 1930
December 24, 1930	Hook, Line and Sinker	Premiered in New York City, wide release on December 26, 1930

=== 1931 ===
RKO acquired Pathé in January, and released films under both the RKO and RKO Pathé labels. Combined, the studio would release 50 films during the year; its film Cimarron won the Best Picture Oscar. By the end of the year, David O. Selznick took over as the head of production for the studio.

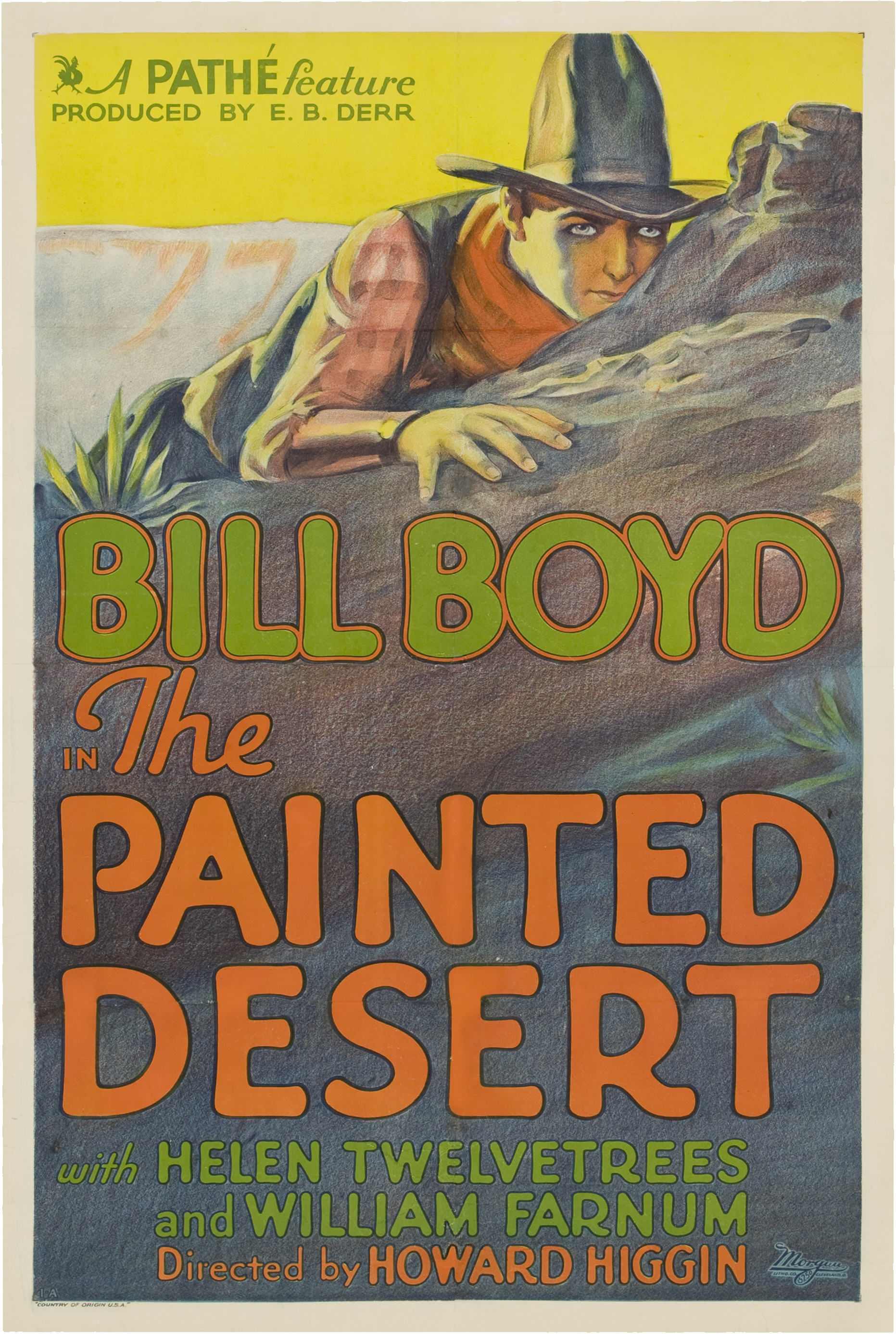
Poster for The Painted Desert

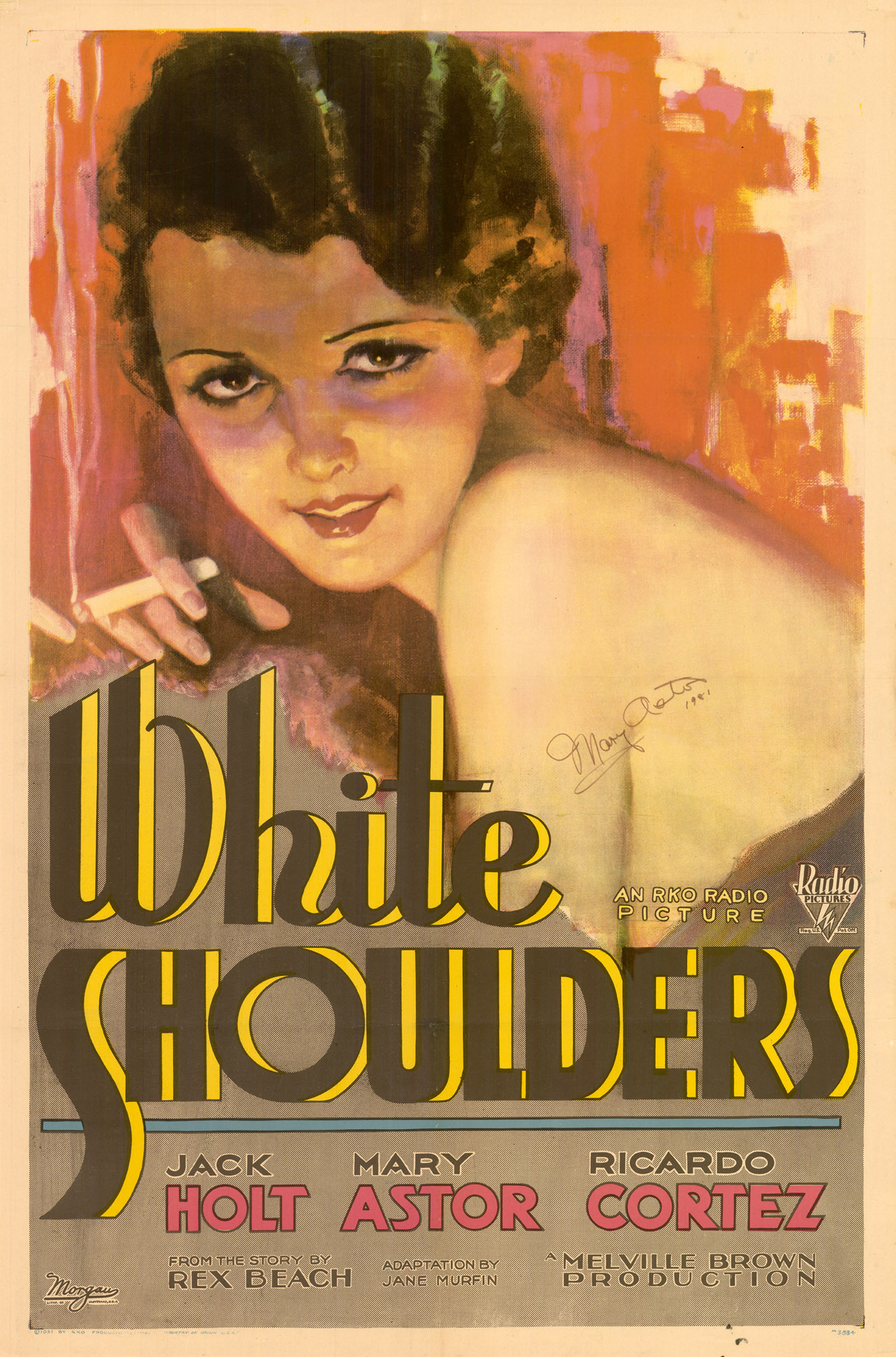
Poster for White Shoulders

Release date	Film	Notes/References
January 15, 1931	The Royal Bed	
January 16, 1931	Beau Ideal	Premiered in New York City, wide release January 25, 1931
January 18, 1931	The Painted Desert	First talking film for Clark Gable
January 26, 1931	Cimarron	Academy Award for Best Picture, the first for a Western film; premiered in New York City, wide release February 9, 1931
February 6, 1931	Millie	Premiered in New York City, wide release February 8, 1931
February 22, 1931	Lonely Wives	
February 22, 1931	Kept Husbands	
March 8, 1931	The Lady Refuses	
March 15, 1931	Behind Office Doors	
March 15, 1931**	The W Plan	
March 27, 1931	Laugh and Get Rich	Premiered in New York City, wide release April 20, 1931
April 1, 1931	The Perfect Alibi	Aka Birds of Prey
April 4, 1931	Cracked Nuts	Premiered in New York City, wide release April 19, 1931
April 12, 1931	Beyond Victory	
April 15, 1931	Bachelor Apartment	
April 17, 1931	Born to Love	
April 18, 1931	The Sin Ship	
May 22, 1931	Everything's Rosie	Premiered in New York City, wide release June 13, 1931
May 23, 1931	Young Donovan's Kid	Premiered in New York City, wide release June 6, 1931
June 6, 1931	White Shoulders	
June 12, 1931	Transgression	Premiered in New York City, wide release June 27, 1931
June 25, 1931	Sweepstakes	Premiered in New York City, wide release July 10, 1931
July 3, 1931	Three Who Loved	
July 8, 1931	A Woman of Experience	Premiered in New York City, wide release August 7, 1931
July 17, 1931	The Common Law	Premiered in New York City, wide release July 24, 1931
July 18, 1931	Too Many Cooks	
July 31, 1931	The Public Defender	Premiered in New York City, wide release August 1, 1931
August 3, 1931*	The Woman Between	
August 7, 1931	Traveling Husbands	Premiered in New York City, wide release August 15, 1931
August 7, 1931	The Runaround	First all-Technicolor RKO production; premiered in New York City, wide release August 22, 1931
August 18, 1931	High Stakes	
August 22, 1931	The Gay Diplomat	
August 28, 1931	Rebound	Premiered in New York City, wide release September 18, 1931
September 4, 1931	The Big Gamble	
September 5, 1931	Caught Plastered	
September 11, 1931	Sundown Trail	
September 12, 1931	Smart Woman	
September 25, 1931	Devotion	
October 2, 1931	Bad Company	
October 3, 1931	Friends and Lovers	
October 10, 1931	Fanny Foley Herself	Second all-Technicolor RKO production
October 15, 1931	Consolation Marriage	Premiered Hollywood, CA; wide release November 21, 1931
October 16, 1931	The Tip-Off	
October 30, 1931	Freighters of Destiny	
November 13, 1931	Are These Our Children	Premiered in New York City, wide release November 14, 1931
November 13, 1931	Way Back Home	
November 14, 1931	Secret Service	
November 20, 1931	Suicide Fleet	
December 18, 1931	The Big Shot	
December 25, 1931	Peach O'Reno	Aka Peach-O-Reno

=== 1932 ===
46 films were produced and released by RKO during the year. Although Selznick was successful in signing major talent like Fred Astaire, Katharine Hepburn and George Cukor, financially, it was one of the worst years for the studio, as it was for many other studios as the Great Depression deepened. The RKO Pathé label was completely abandoned during this year.

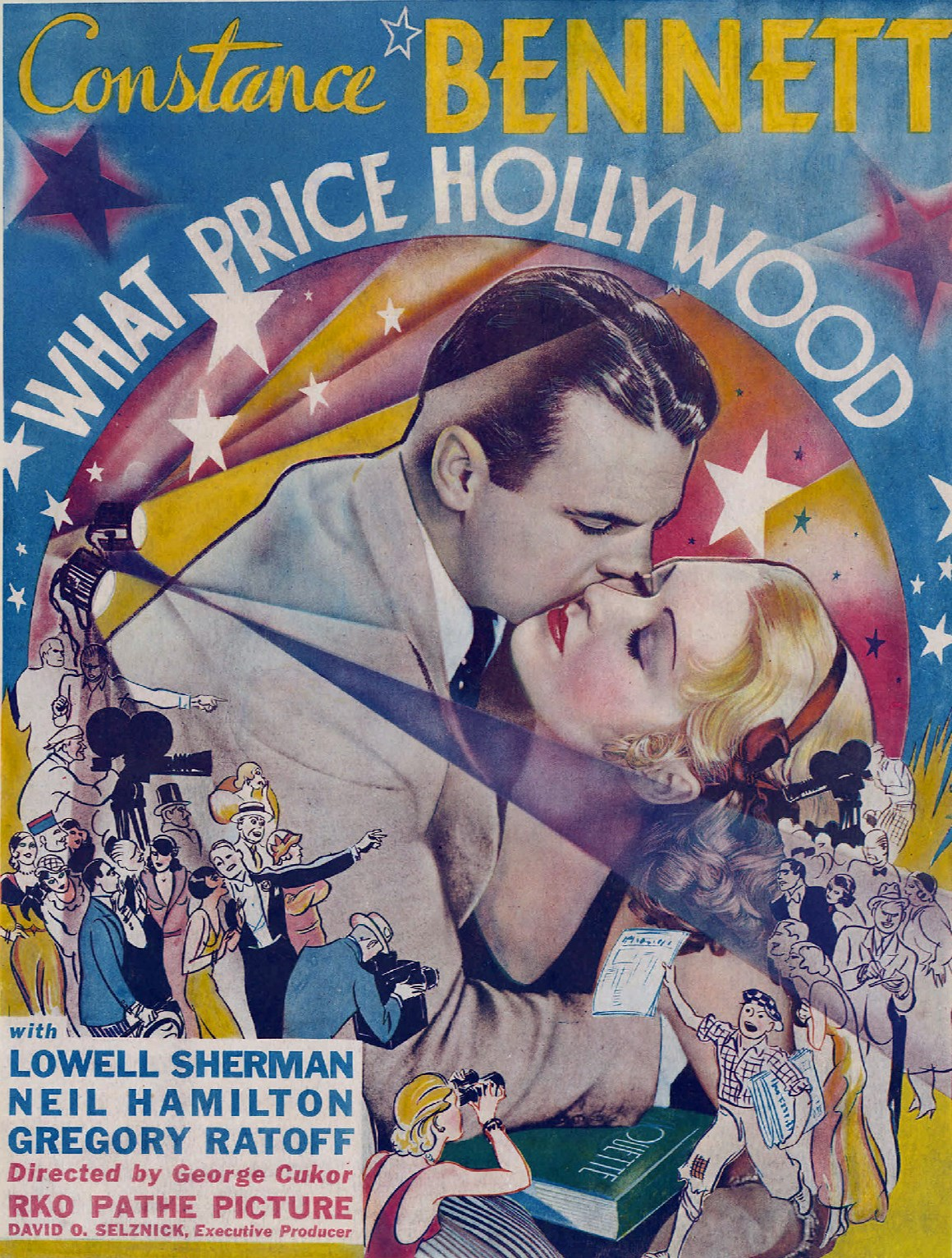
Window card for What Price Hollywood?

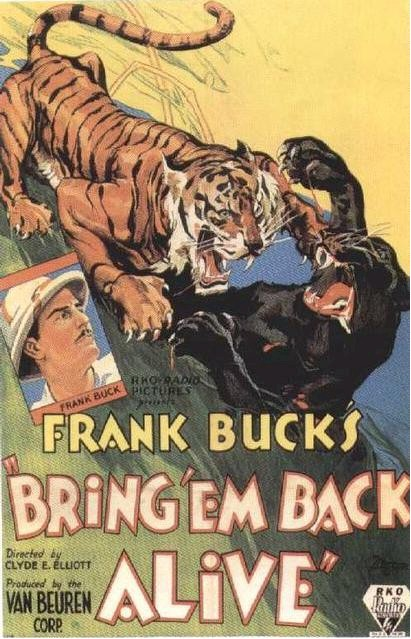
Poster for Bring 'Em Back Alive

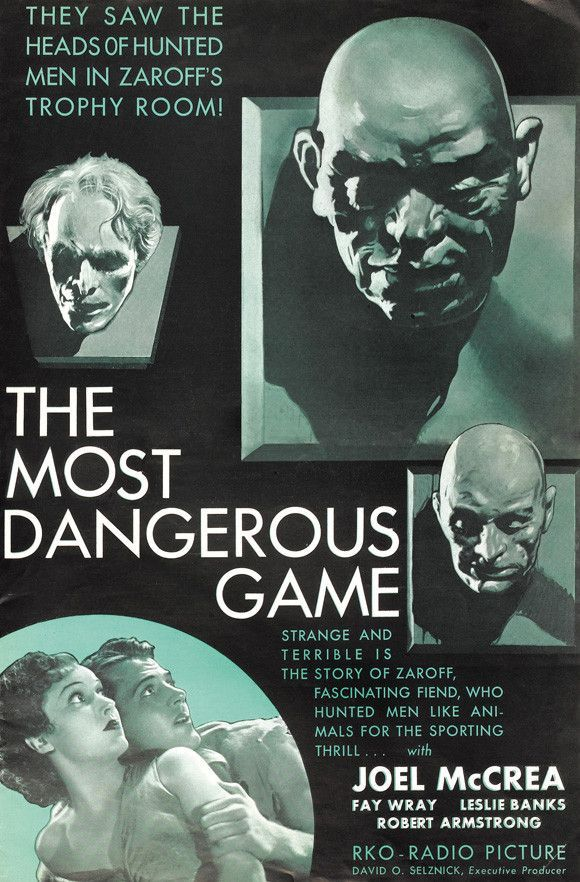
Poster for The Most Dangerous Game

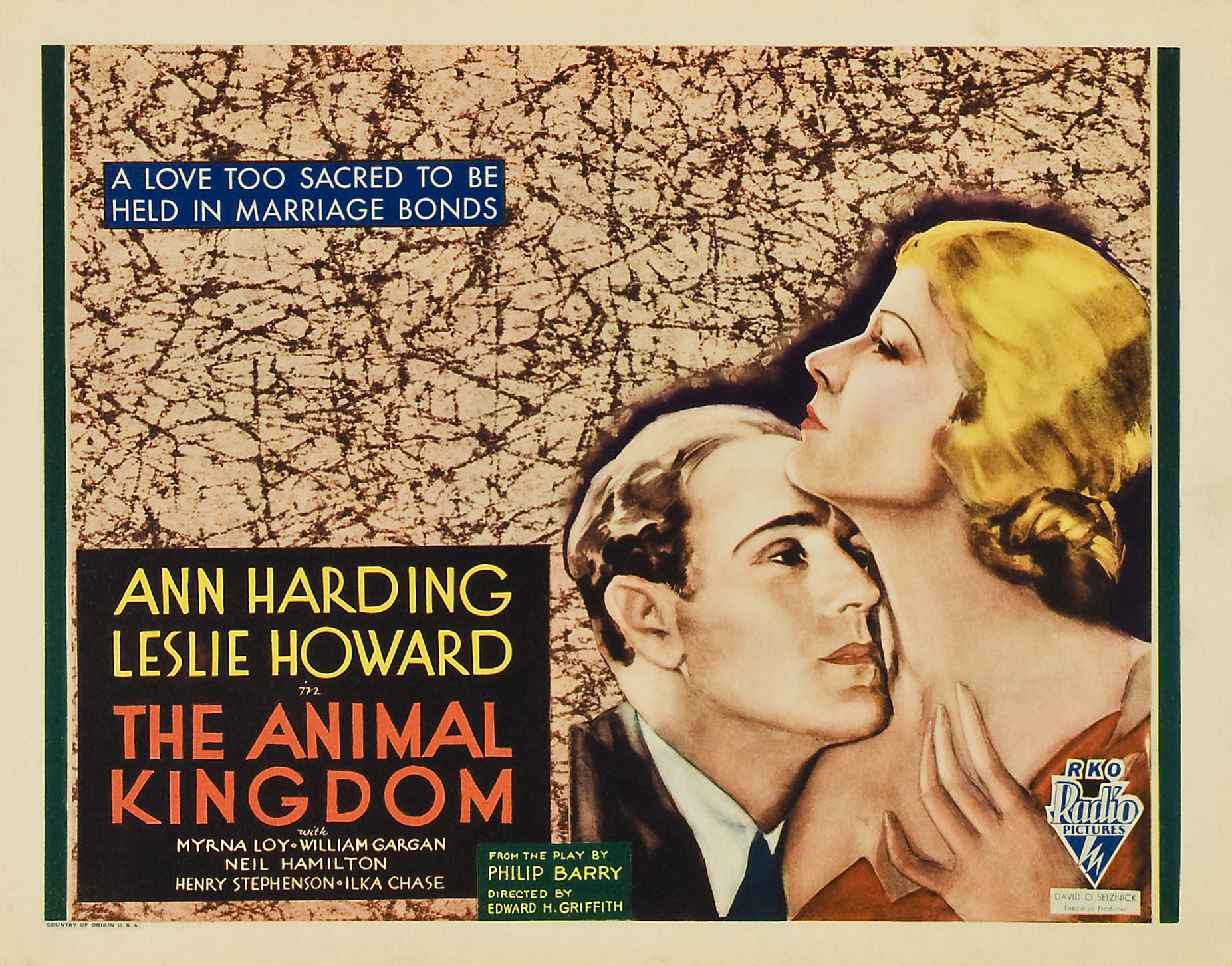
Lobby card for The Animal Kingdom

Release date	Film	Notes/References
January 1, 1932	A Woman Commands	First talking film for Pola Negri
January 8, 1932	Men of Chance	Released in January, after premiering in NYC on December 26, 1931
January 8, 1932	Partners	
January 15, 1932	Girl of the Rio	
January 19, 1932	Panama Flo	
January 22, 1932	Prestige	
February 5, 1932	Ladies of the Jury	
February 19, 1932	Lady with a Past	
March 10, 1932	The Lost Squadron	
March 19, 1932	The Saddle Buster	
March 19, 1932	Carnival Boat	
March 27, 1932	Girl Crazy	
March 29, 1932	The Theft of the Mona Lisa	Distribution only, produced by Super-Film GmbH
April 8, 1932	Young Bride	
April 8, 1932	The Office Girl	Aka Sunshine Susie; distribution only
April 14, 1932	Symphony of Six Million	
April 28, 1932	The Roadhouse Murder	
May 5, 1932	State's Attorney	
May 13, 1932	Ghost Valley	
May 27, 1932	Westward Passage	
June 17, 1932	Is My Face Red?	
June 24, 1932	What Price Hollywood?	
July 8, 1932	Beyond the Rockies	
July 8, 1932	Roar of the Dragon	
August 12, 1932	Bird of Paradise	Currently in the public domain
August 19, 1932	The Age of Consent	
August 19, 1932	Bring 'Em Back Alive	
September 9, 1932	The Most Dangerous Game	
September 16, 1932	Hold 'Em Jail	
September 16, 1932	Thirteen Women	
September 23, 1932	Hell's Highway	
September 23, 1932	Come On Danger!	
September 30, 1932	A Bill of Divorcement (Note: Owned by Disney (via ABC))	
October 7, 1932	Strange Justice	
October 14, 1932	The Phantom of Crestwood	
November 4, 1932	Little Orphan Annie (Note: Owned by Sony Pictures (via Columbia Pictures))	
November 11, 1932	The Sport Parade	
November 18, 1932	Men Are Such Fools	
November 18, 1932	The Conquerors	
November 25, 1932	Renegades of the West	
November 25, 1932	Rockabye	
November 25, 1932	Men of America	
December 2, 1932	Secrets of the French Police	
December 9, 1932	The Penguin Pool Murder	
December 16, 1932	The Half-Naked Truth	
December 23, 1932	The Animal Kingdom	Currently in the public domain

=== 1933 ===
RKO produced and/or distributed 49 films during the year. Selznick left the studio early in 1933 due to in-fighting over production control. As a result of the record losses in 1932, the studio went into receivership. Through all the hardship, and while posting a net loss for the year of just over $4 million, the studio saw some large successes, such as King Kong, Little Women, Flying Down to Rio (the first pairing of Astaire and Rogers), and Morning Glory (which netted Katharine Hepburn her first Oscar for Best Actress).

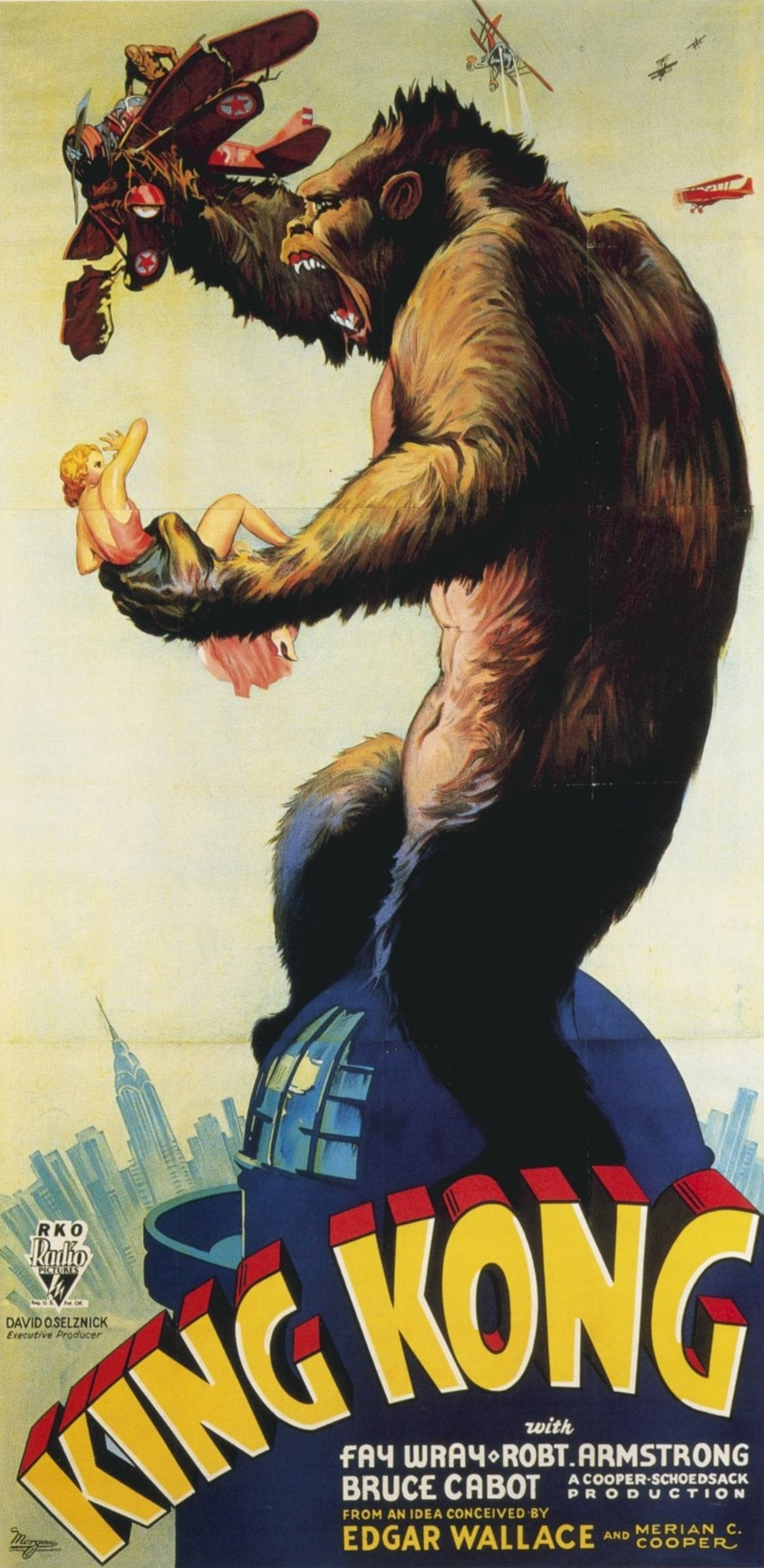
Poster for King Kong

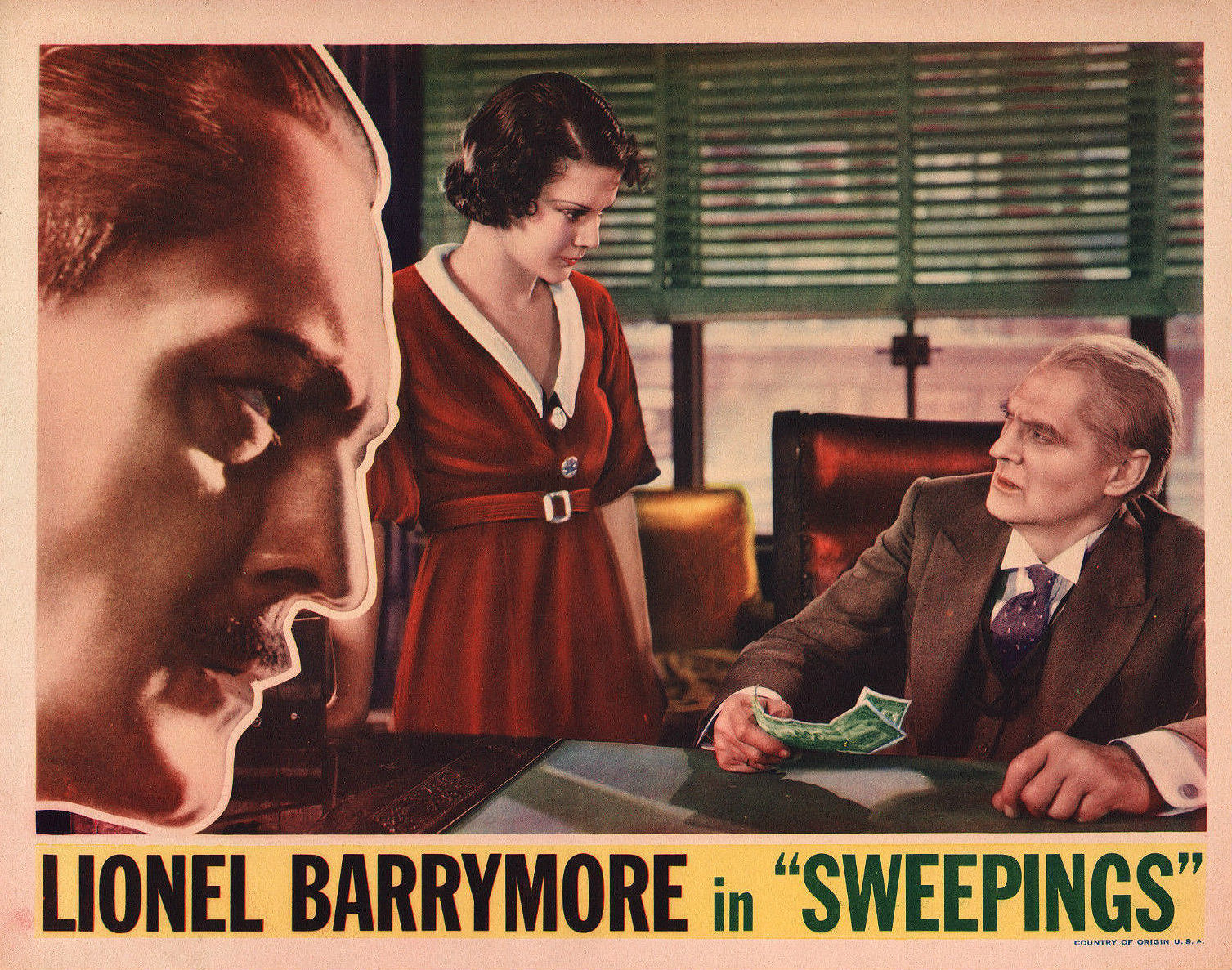
Lobby card for Sweepings

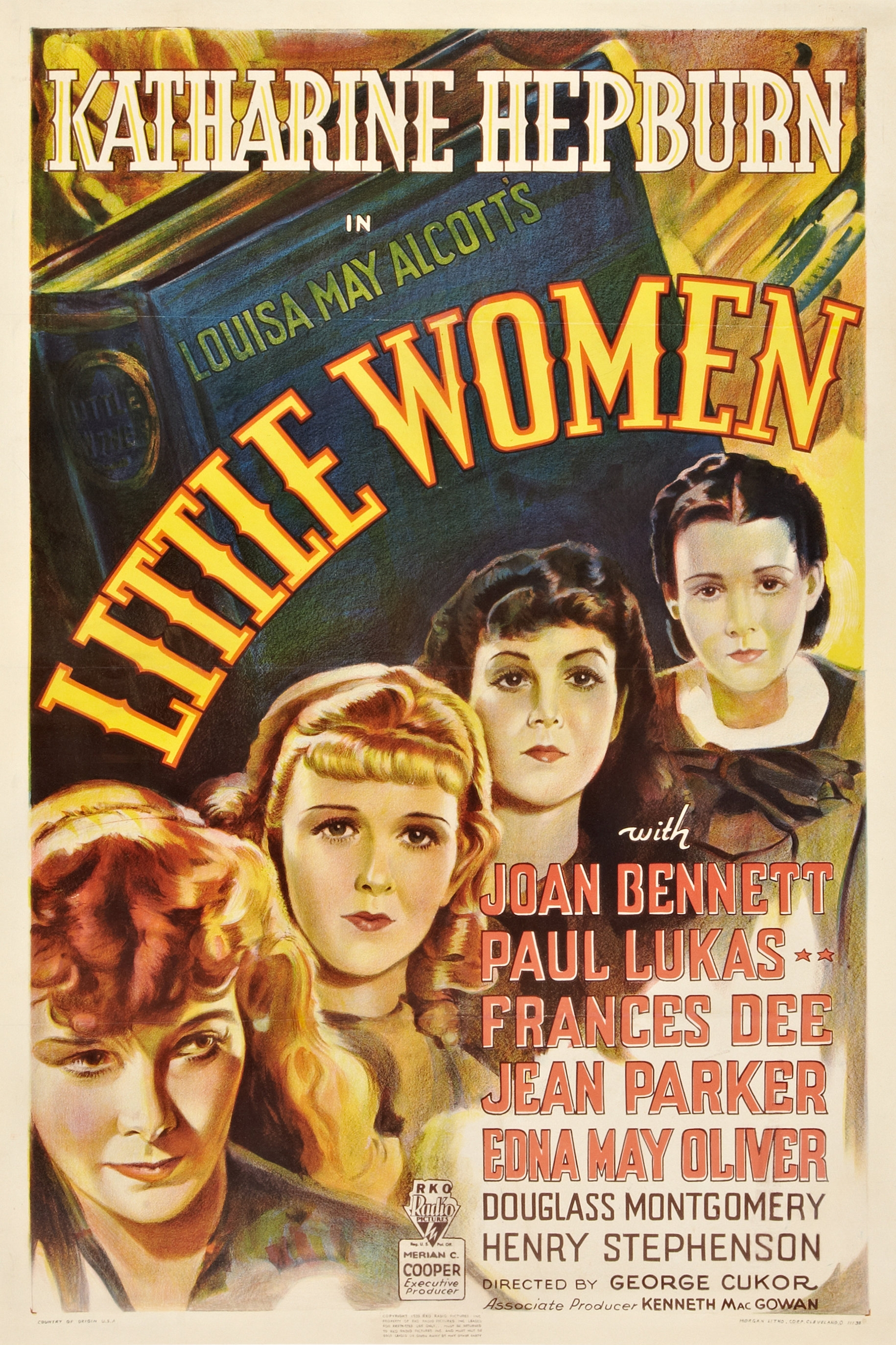
Poster for Little Women

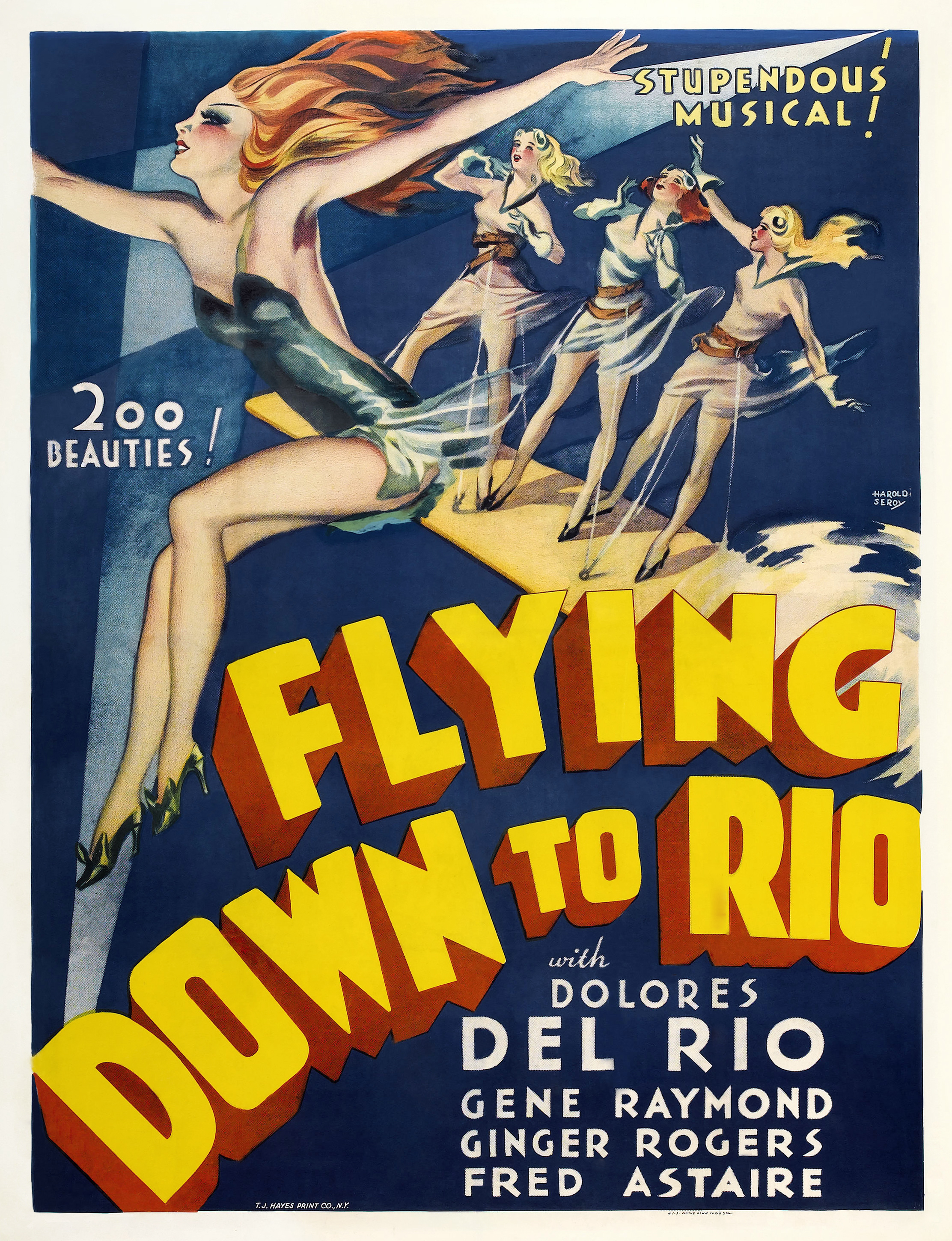
Poster for Flying Down to Rio

Release date	Film	Notes
January 6, 1933	No Other Woman	
January 13, 1933	The Monkey's Paw	
January 20, 1933	The Cheyenne Kid	
January 20, 1933	The Past of Mary Holmes	
January 27, 1933	Goldie Gets Along	
January 28, 1933	Lucky Devils	
February 17, 1933	The Great Jasper	
February 23, 1933	Our Betters	
February 24, 1933	Topaze	
March 7, 1933	Sailor Be Good	
March 9, 1933	Christopher Strong	
March 10, 1933	Scarlet River	
April 7, 1933	King Kong	
April 14, 1933	Sweepings	
April 28, 1933	India Speaks	
April 29, 1933	Diplomaniacs	
May 5, 1933	Son of the Border	
May 5, 1933	The Silver Cord	
May 24, 1933	Man Hunt	
June 2, 1933	Tomorrow at Seven	
June 9, 1933	Professional Sweetheart	
June 16, 1933	Melody Cruise	
June 24, 1933	Emergency Call	
June 29, 1933	Bed of Roses	
June 30, 1933	Cross Fire	
July 13, 1933	Double Harness	
July 14, 1933	Flying Devils	
July 28, 1933	Headline Shooter	
August 4, 1933	Before Dawn	
August 5, 1933	The Big Brain	
August 8, 1933	No Marriage Ties	
August 18, 1933	Morning Glory	
August 18, 1933	Blind Adventure	
August 18, 1933	Deluge	
September 1, 1933	Rafter Romance	
September 8, 1933	One Man's Journey	
September 22, 1933	Midshipman Jack	
September 26, 1933	Ann Vickers	
September 29, 1933	Flaming Gold	
October 20, 1933	Ace of Aces	
October 26, 1933	After Tonight	
October 27, 1933	Chance at Heaven	
November 3, 1933	Aggie Appleby, Maker of Men	
November 10, 1933	Goodbye Love	
November 16, 1933	Little Women	Nominated for the Academy Award for Best Picture
November 17, 1933	The Right to Romance	
December 1, 1933	If I Were Free	
December 22, 1933	Flying Down to Rio	First film teaming of Fred Astaire and Ginger Rogers
December 22, 1933	Son of Kong	

=== 1934 ===
RKO released 45 films in 1934. While the studio lost money, its losses were far less ($310,000) than they had been in the prior three years. The year saw George Stevens become a major director. Several highlights of the year were The Lost Patrol (the first RKO film directed by John Ford), Of Human Bondage, Anne of Green Gables, and The Little Minister.

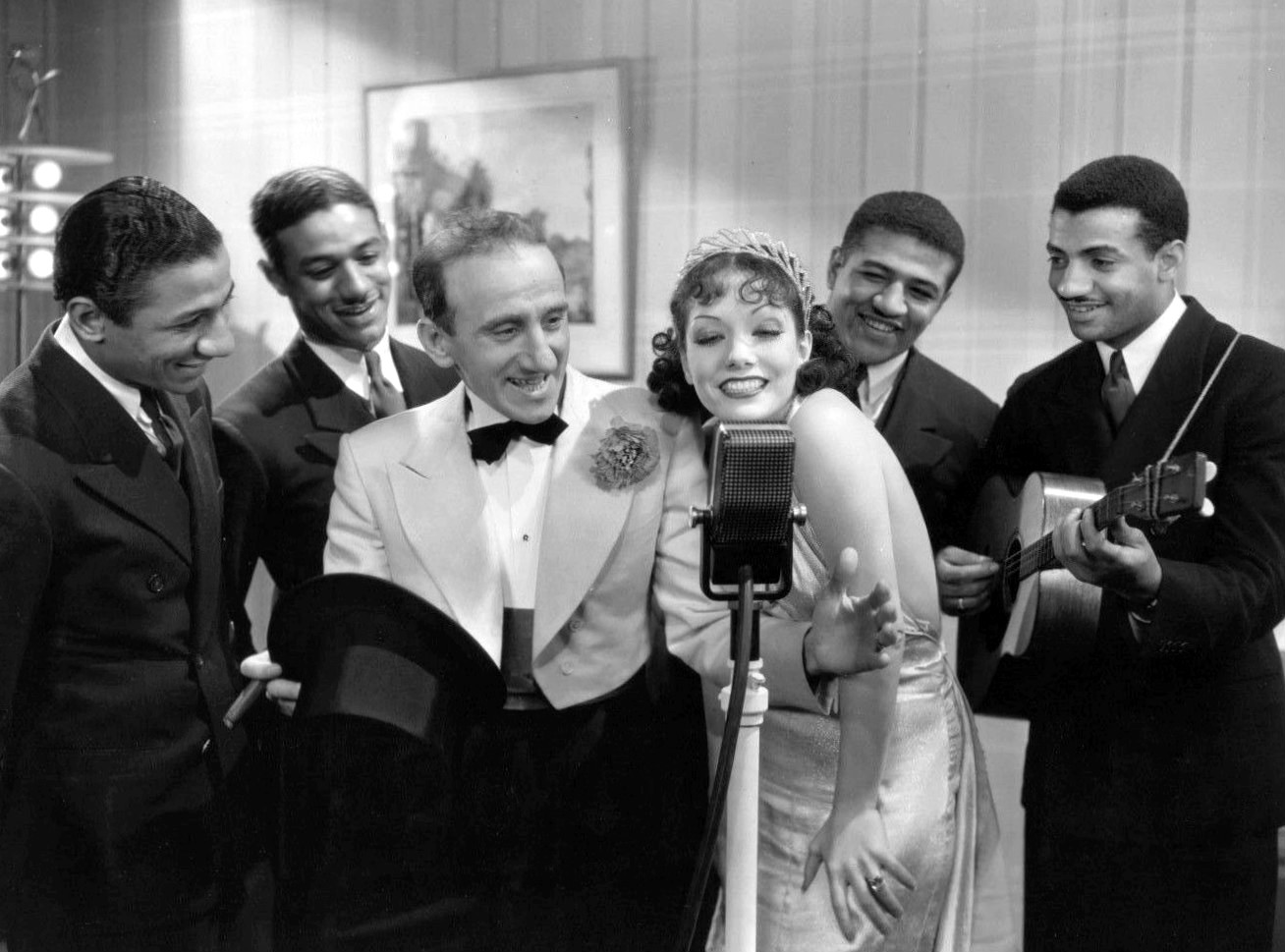
Jimmy Durante, Lupe Vélez, and The Mills Brothers in Strictly Dynamite

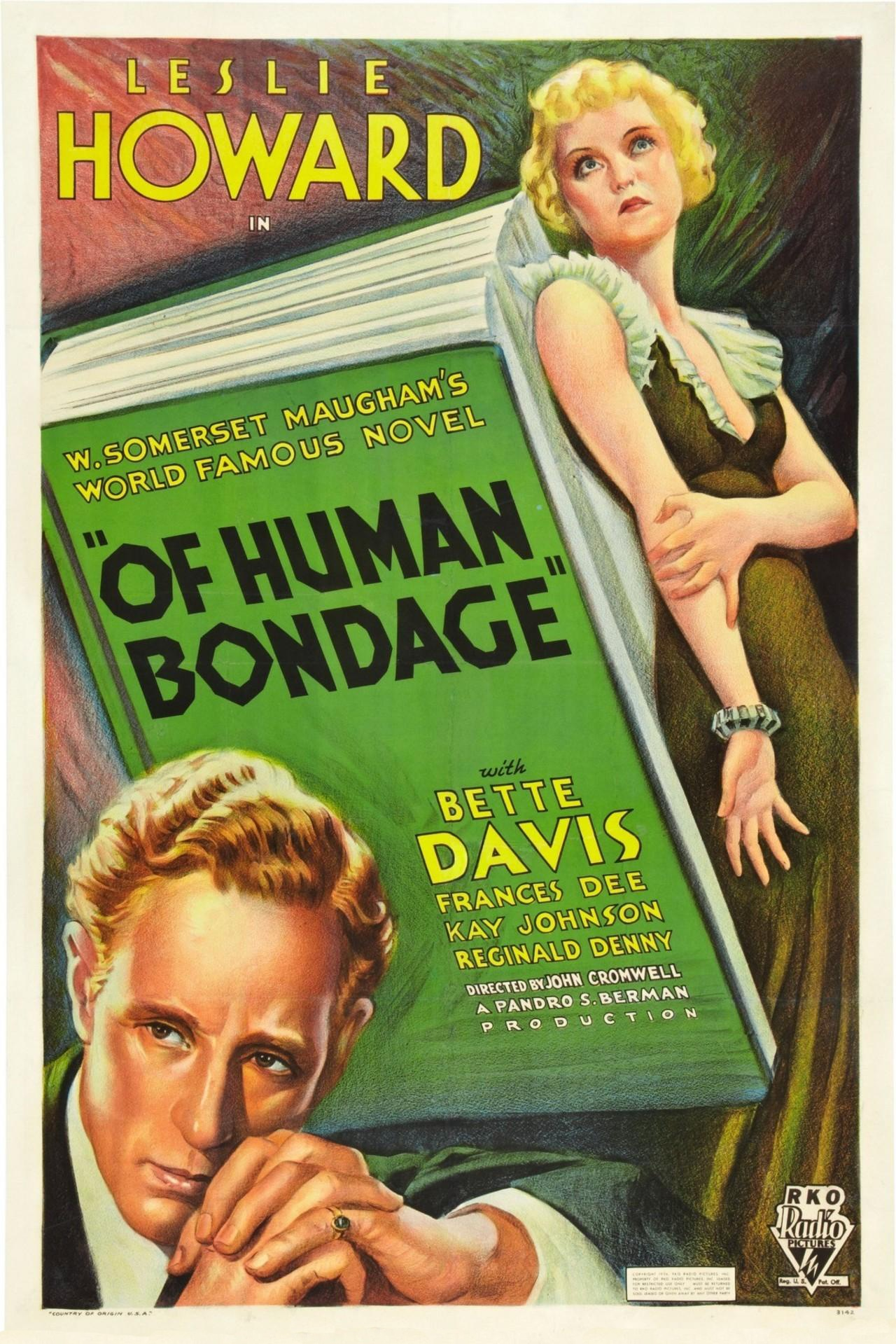
Poster for Of Human Bondage

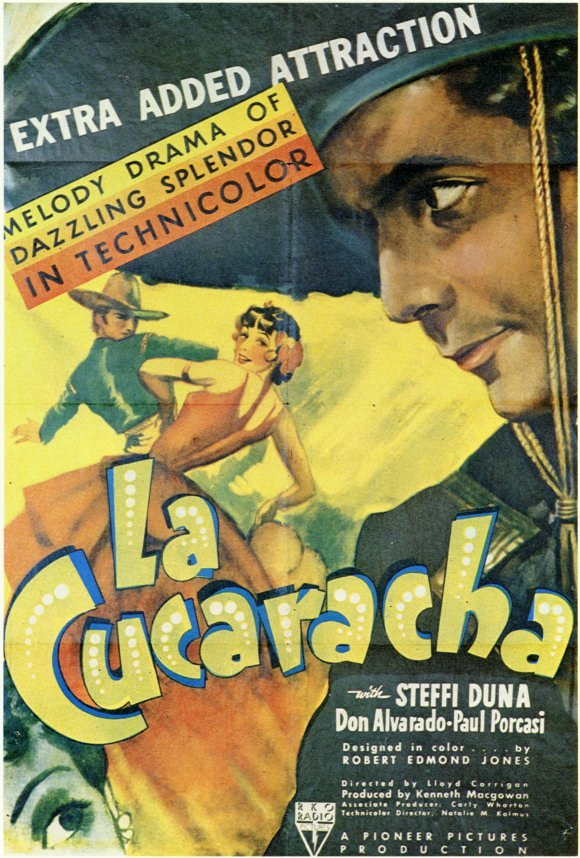
Poster for La Cucaracha

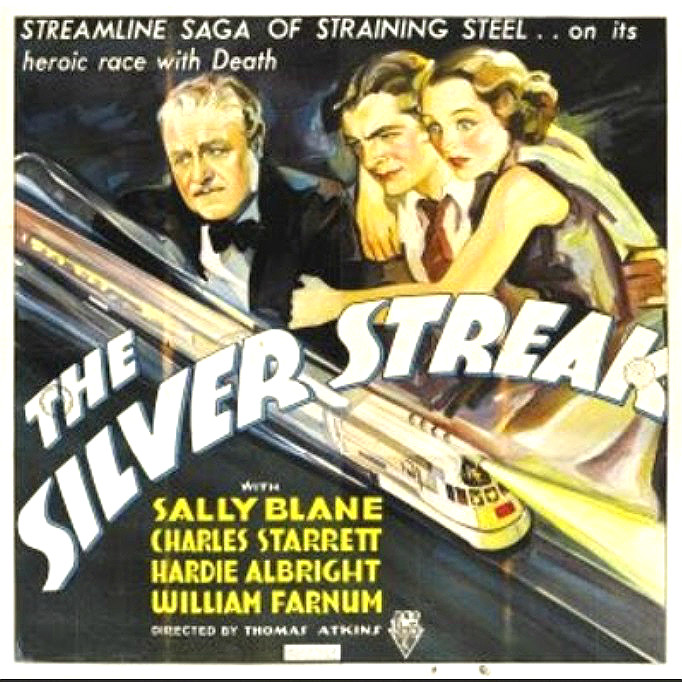
Poster for The Silver Streak

Release date	Film	Notes
January 12, 1934	The Meanest Gal in Town	
January 13, 1934	Man of Two Worlds	
January 19, 1934	Long Lost Father	
January 26, 1934	Two Alone	
February 2, 1934	Hips, Hips, Hooray!	
February 16, 1934	The Lost Patrol	
March 2, 1934	Keep 'Em Rolling	
March 8, 1934	Spitfire	
March 14, 1934	The Crime Doctor	
April 6, 1934	Wild Cargo	
April 13, 1934	This Man is Mine	
April 19, 1934	Where Sinners Meet	
April 20, 1934	Sing and Like It	
May 3, 1934**	Success at Any Price	Some sources, including AFI, have the film opening in March, but the New York Times review is on May 4, which would coincide with the May 3 release date.
May 4, 1934	Finishing School	
May 11, 1934	Strictly Dynamite	
May 12, 1934	Stingaree	
June 14, 1934	The Life of Vergie Winters	Premiered in New York City, general release date was June 22, 1934
June 15, 1934	Murder on the Blackboard	
June 22, 1934	Let's Try Again	
June 28, 1934	Of Human Bondage (Note: Owned by Warner Bros. (via Turner Entertainment Co.) in some international territories, but currently in the public domain in the United States. Kino Lorber issued a restoration by the Library of Congress in 2012)	
June 29, 1934	Cockeyed Cavaliers	
July 13, 1934	We're Rich Again	
July 17, 1934	His Greatest Gamble	Premiered in New York City, general release date was August 10, 1934
July 26, 1934	Hat, Coat, and Glove	Premiered in New York City, general release date was July 27, 1934
July 28, 1934	Bachelor Bait	
August 17, 1934	Their Big Moment	
August 17, 1934	Adventure Girl	
August 23, 1934	The Fountain	
August 31, 1934	Down to Their Last Yacht	
September 14, 1934	The Age of Innocence	Premiered on September 1, 1934
September 21, 1934	The Richest Girl in the World	
October 5, 1934	Dangerous Corner	
October 12, 1934	The Gay Divorcee	Nominated for the Academy Award for Best Picture
October 26, 1934	Gridiron Flash	
October 26, 1934	Wednesday's Child	
November 2, 1934	Kentucky Kernels	
November 9, 1934	By Your Leave	
November 9, 1934	Woman in the Dark	
November 23, 1934	Anne of Green Gables	
December 7, 1934	Lightning Strikes Twice	
December 10, 1934	The Silver Streak	
December 14, 1934	Red Morning	
December 27, 1934	West of the Pecos	Premiered in New York City, general release date was January 4, 1935
December 28, 1934	The Little Minister	

=== 1935 ===
RKO released 42 films in 1935, of which it produced 39. There was yet another shake-up in the management structure of the studio, but the company saw its first profit since 1930, albeit a small one of $684,000. Highlights of the year included Alice Adams, and Becky Sharp (the first full-length feature film made entirely in Technicolor). The studio also saw several major disappointments, including The Last Days of Pompeii. In addition to the films produced, RKO acquired the distribution rights for The March of Time newsreel series in June 1935, a relationship with Time magazine that continued until July 1942. Released monthly, each edition was approximately 20 minutes long.

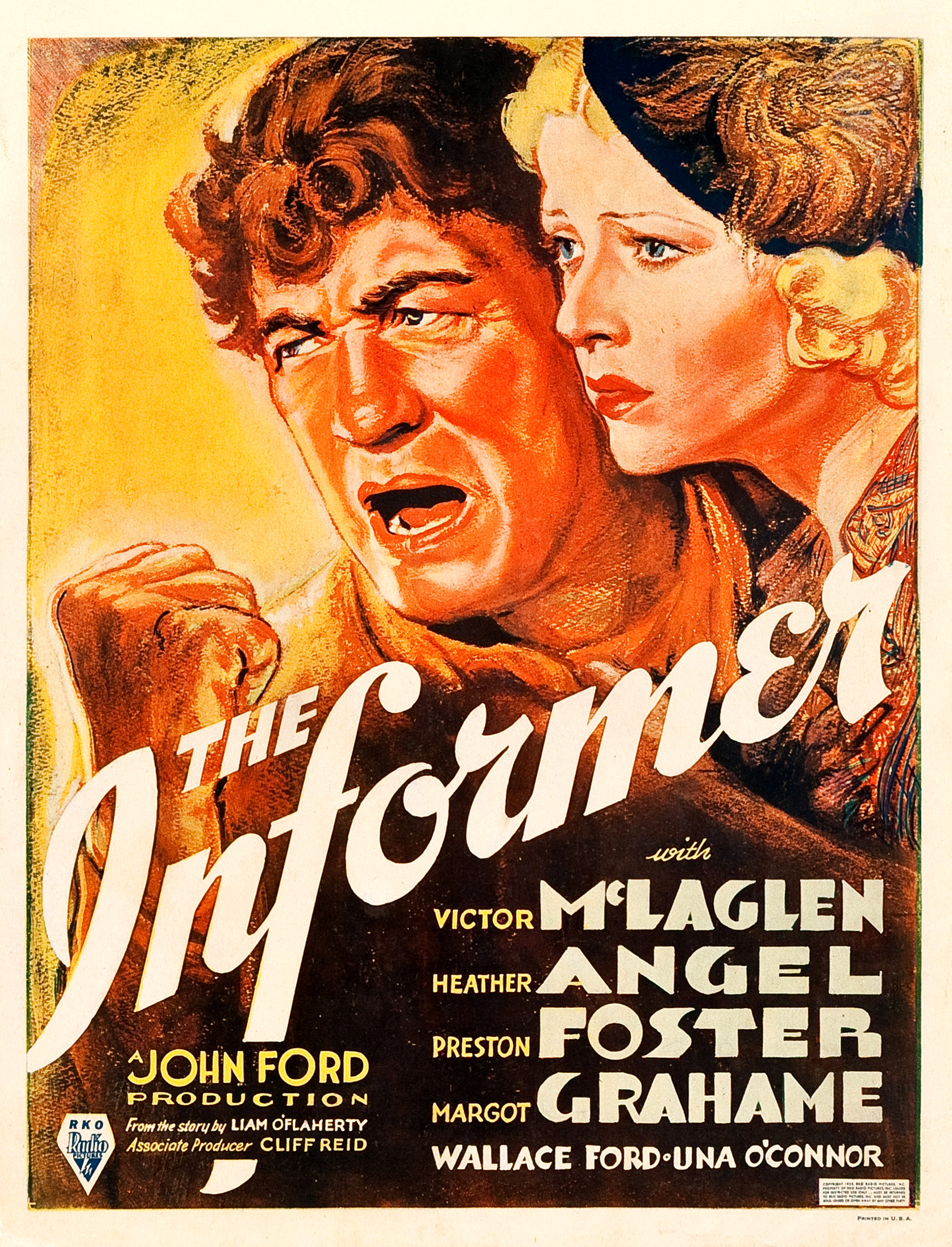
Poster for The Informer

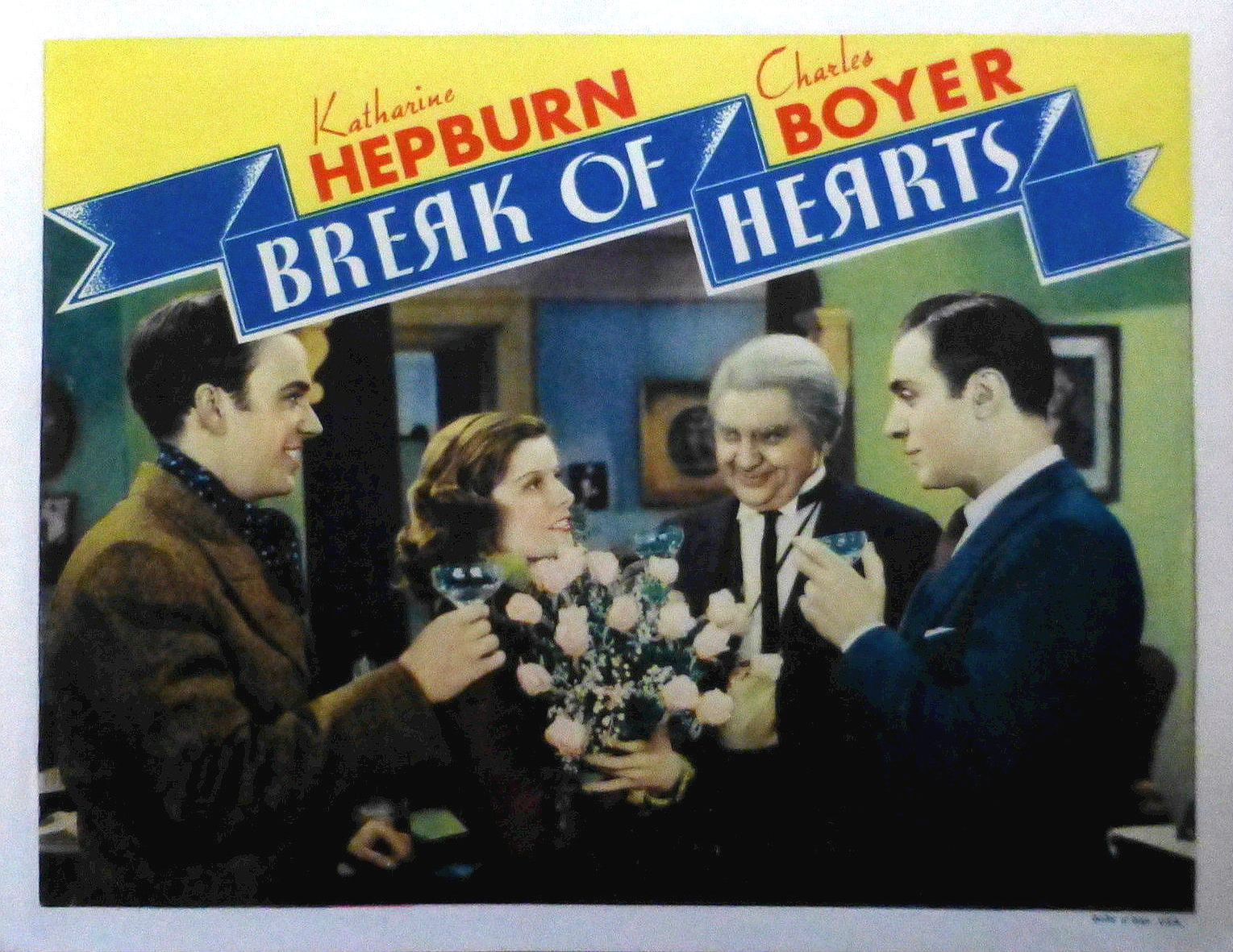
Lobby card for Break of Hearts

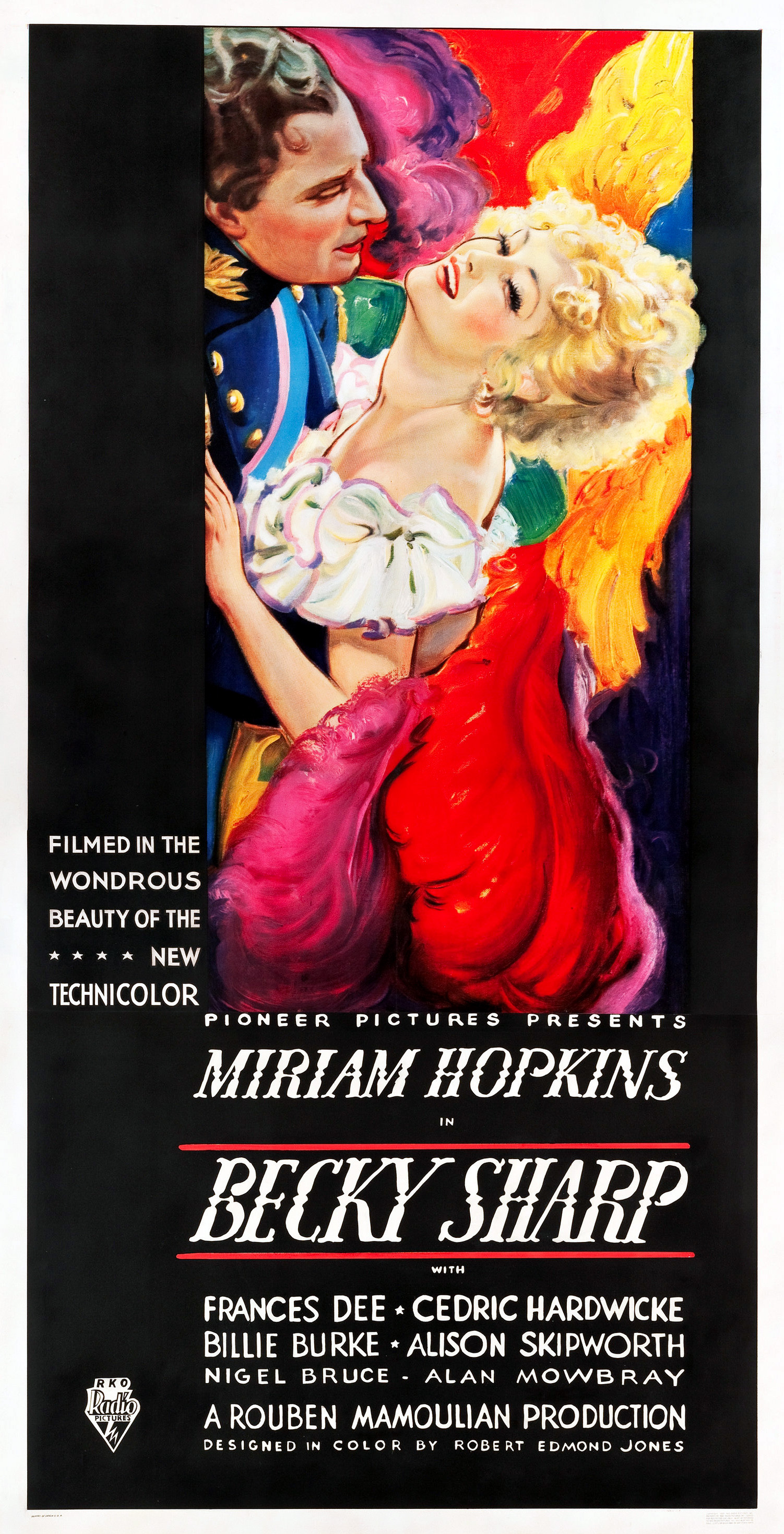
Poster for Becky Sharp

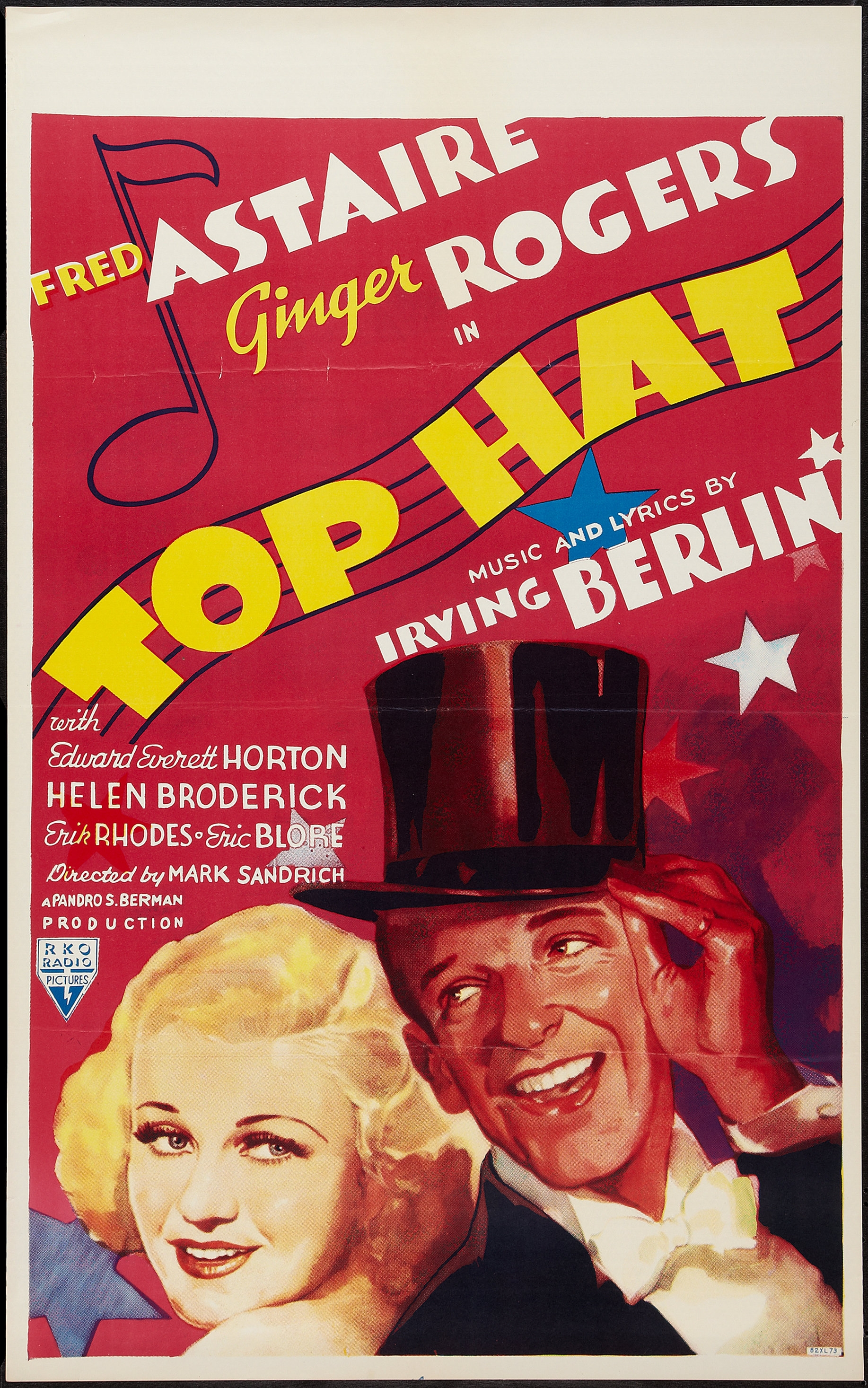
Poster for Top Hat, most successful film of the Fred Astaire-Ginger Rogers partnership and Academy Award nominee for Outstanding Production

Release date	Film	Notes
January 11, 1935	Romance in Manhattan	
January 18, 1935	Grand Old Girl	
February 1, 1935	Enchanted April	
February 14, 1935	Murder on a Honeymoon	Wide release date was February 22
February 15, 1935	Gigolette	Distribution only, produced by Select Productions
March 1, 1935	Captain Hurricane	
March 8, 1935	Roberta	
March 15, 1935	The People's Enemy	Distribution only, produced by Select Productions
March 22, 1935	A Dog of Flanders	
April 1, 1935	Strangers All	
April 5, 1935	Laddie	
April 11, 1935	Star of Midnight	Wide release date was April 19
May 3, 1935	Chasing Yesterday	
May 9, 1935	The Informer	Nominated for the Academy Award for Best Picture; wide release date was May 24
May 10, 1935	Village Tale	
May 16, 1935	Break of Hearts	Wide release date was May 31
June 7, 1935	The Nitwits	
June 13, 1935	Becky Sharp (Note: Owned by Paramount Pictures (via Republic Pictures))	First full-length feature entirely in three-strip Technicolor; wide release date was June 28; distribution only, produced by Pioneer Films
June 14, 1935	Hooray for Love	
June 28, 1935	The Arizonian	
July 12, 1935	She	
August 2, 1935	Old Man Rhythm	
August 9, 1935	Jalna	
August 15, 1935	Alice Adams	Nominated for the Academy Award for Best Picture; wide release date was August 23
September 6, 1935	Hot Tip	
August 29, 1935	Top Hat	Nominated for the Academy Award for Best Picture; went into wide release on September 6
September 13, 1935	The Return of Peter Grimm	
September 27, 1935	Powdersmoke Range	
September 29, 1935	His Family Tree	
October 4, 1935	Freckles	
October 11, 1935	Hi, Gaucho!	
October 18, 1935	The Last Days of Pompeii	
October 25, 1935	The Rainmakers	
November 1, 1935	The Three Musketeers	
November 8, 1935	To Beat the Band	
November 15, 1935	Annie Oakley	
November 22, 1935	In Person	
November 27, 1935	I Dream Too Much	
December 13, 1935	Seven Keys to Baldpate	
December 20, 1935	Another Face	
December 20, 1935	Fang and Claw	
December 27, 1935	We're Only Human	

=== 1936 ===
1936 was another profitable year for RKO, which released 39 films. The studio saw the arrival of producer Howard Hawks as well as George and Ira Gershwin. Although the studio did well overall, two of the few outstanding pictures to come out during the year were Follow the Fleet and Swing Time, which were both Astaire and Rogers vehicles, and one of the biggest disappointments of the year was Sylvia Scarlett, starring Katharine Hepburn.

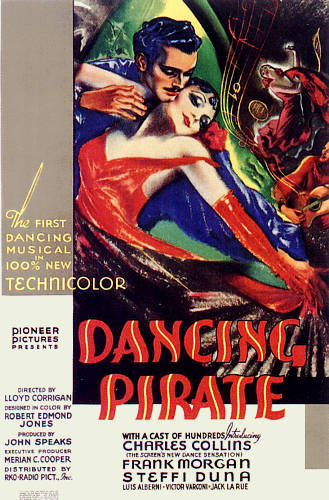
Poster for Dancing Pirate

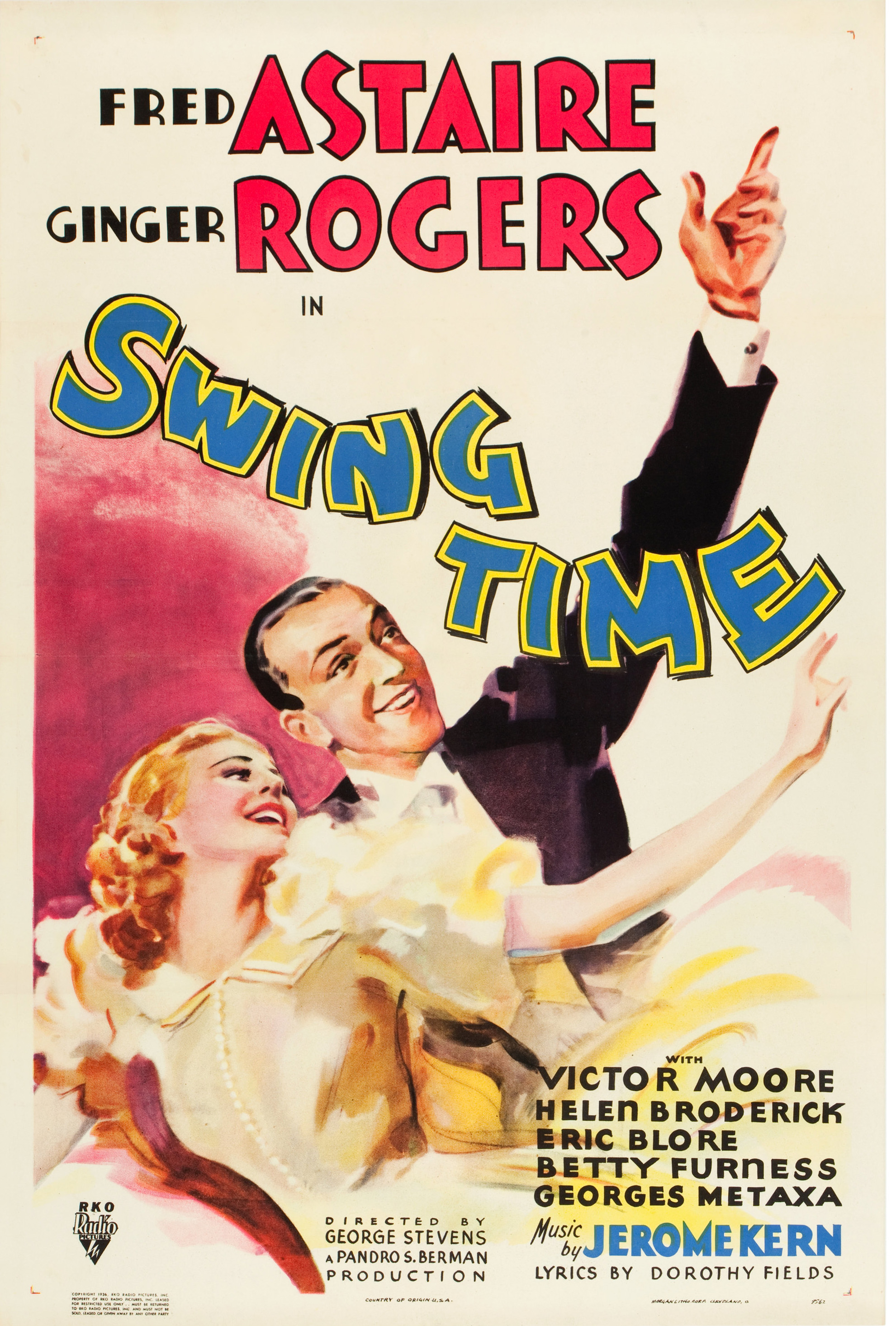
Poster for Swing Time

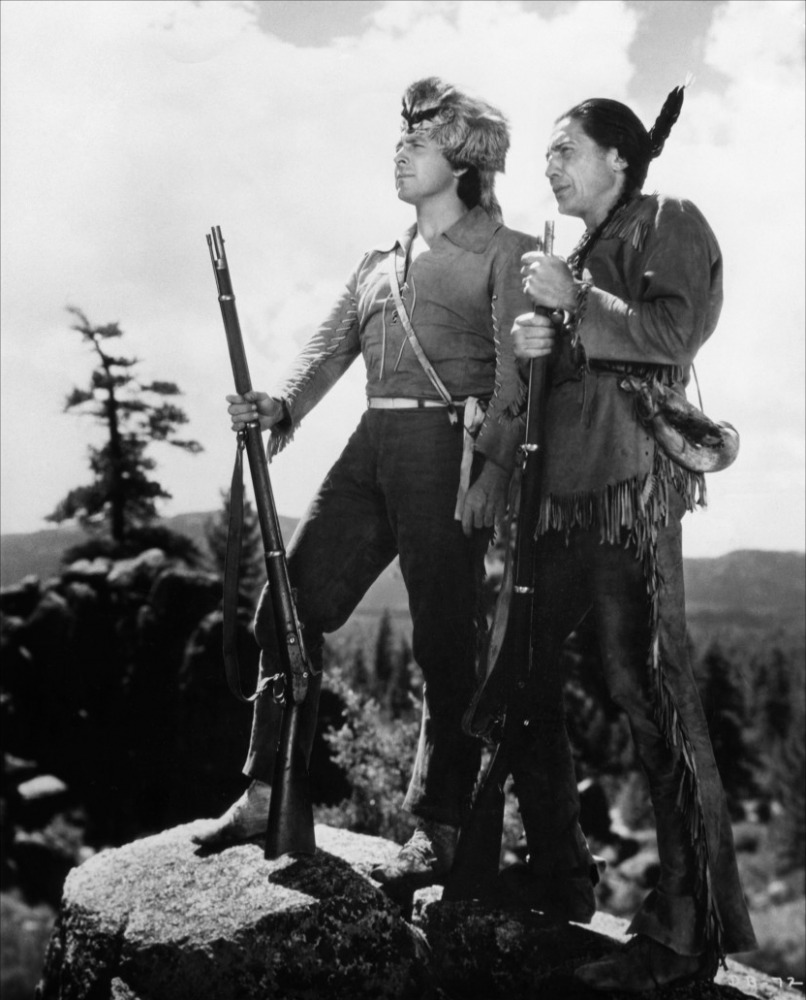
George O'Brien and George Regas in Daniel Boone

Release date	Film	Notes
January 3, 1936	Sylvia Scarlett	
January 10, 1936	Two in the Dark	
January 17, 1936	Chatterbox	
February 1, 1936	Muss 'Em Up	Premiered in New York City, wide release on February 14, 1936
February 7, 1936	The Lady Consents	
February 21, 1936	Follow the Fleet	
February 22, 1936	Yellow Dust	Premiered in New York City, wide release on March 13, 1936
March 4, 1936	Love on a Bet	Premiered in New York City, wide release on March 6, 1936
March 6, 1936	The Farmer in the Dell	Premiered in New York City, wide release on March 27, 1936
March 20, 1936	Silly Billies	
April 3, 1936	Two in Revolt	
April 17, 1936	Murder on a Bridle Path	
April 24, 1936	The Witness Chair	
April 24, 1936	Special Investigator	Premiered in New York City, wide release on May 8, 1936
May 15, 1936	The Ex-Mrs. Bradford	
May 22, 1936	Dancing Pirate	
July 10, 1936	The Bride Walks Out	
July 12, 1936	Let's Sing Again	
June 12, 1936	The Last Outlaw	Premiered in New York City, wide release on June 19, 1936
June 26, 1936	Bunker Bean	
July 27, 1936	M'Liss	
July 31, 1936	Grand Jury	Premiered in New York City, wide release on August 7, 1936
August 21, 1936	Second Wife	
August 28, 1936	Mary of Scotland	
September 4, 1936	Swing Time	
September 11, 1936	Walking on Air	
September 18, 1936	Don't Turn 'Em Loose	
October 2, 1936	Mummy's Boys	
October 9, 1936	The Big Game	
October 17, 1936	Daniel Boone	
October 23, 1936	Without Orders	
November 6, 1936	A Woman Rebels	
November 13, 1936	Make Way for a Lady	
November 20, 1936	Winterset	
November 27, 1936	Smartest Girl in Town	
December 4, 1936	Wanted! Jane Turner	
December 11, 1936	The Plot Thickens	
December 18, 1936	Night Waitress	
December 25, 1936	Rainbow on the River	

=== 1937 ===
1937 was the most productive year in RKO's history, with the studio releasing 56 films, as well as entering into an agreement to distribute films produced by Walt Disney Productions, in place of Van Beuren Studios, which subsequently folded its operations. Snow White and the Seven Dwarfs, the first Disney film released by RKO, premiered on December 21, 1937, although it underwent wide release on February 4, 1938, and was a huge success. It was one of the few successes of the year for RKO, which again went through yet another management change. Another bright spot for the studio was Stage Door, which was only a small financial success, yet received very good critical notices, including four Oscar nominations.

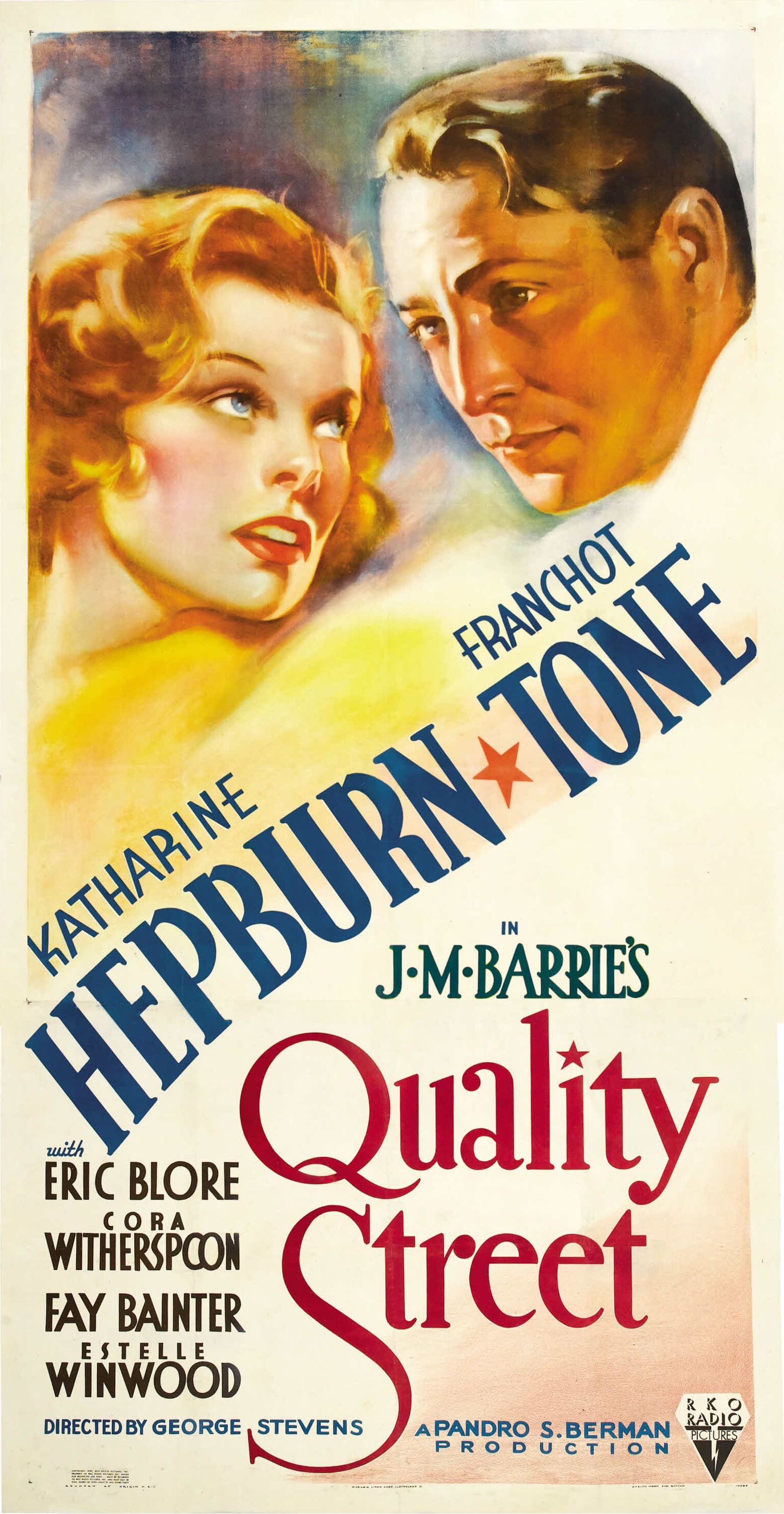
Poster for Quality Street

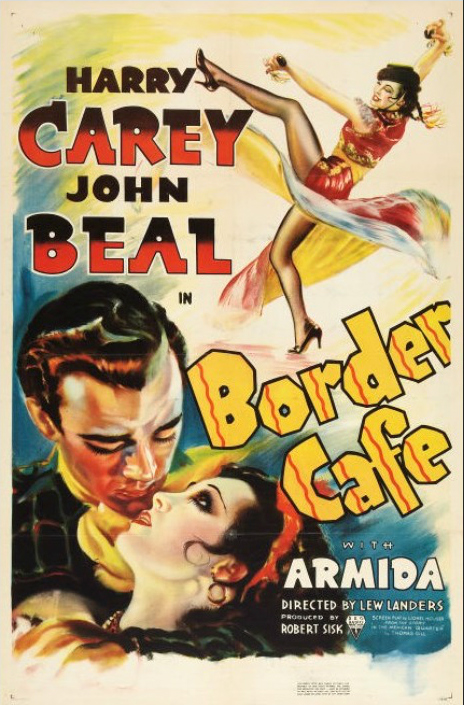
Poster for Border Cafe

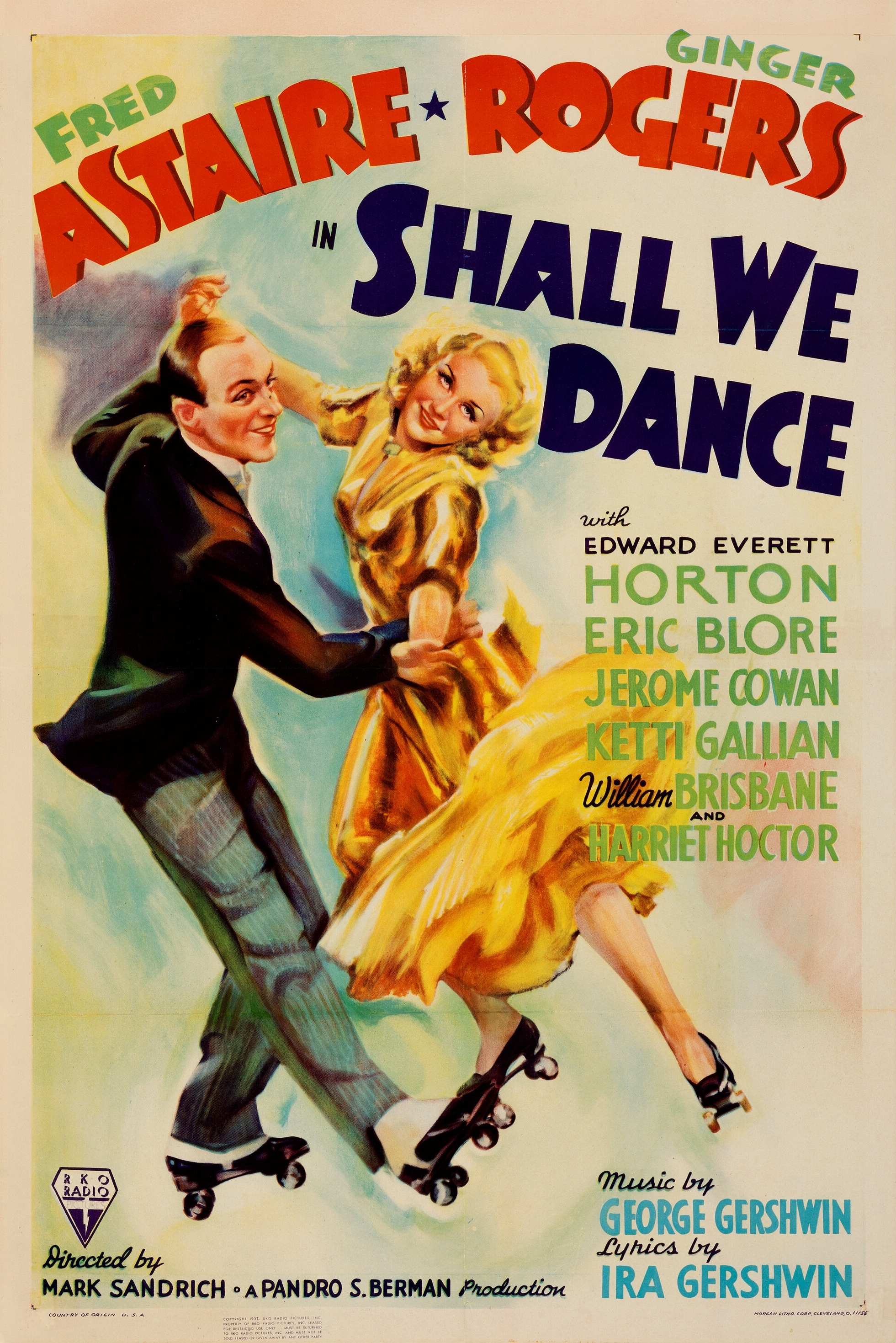
Poster for Shall We Dance

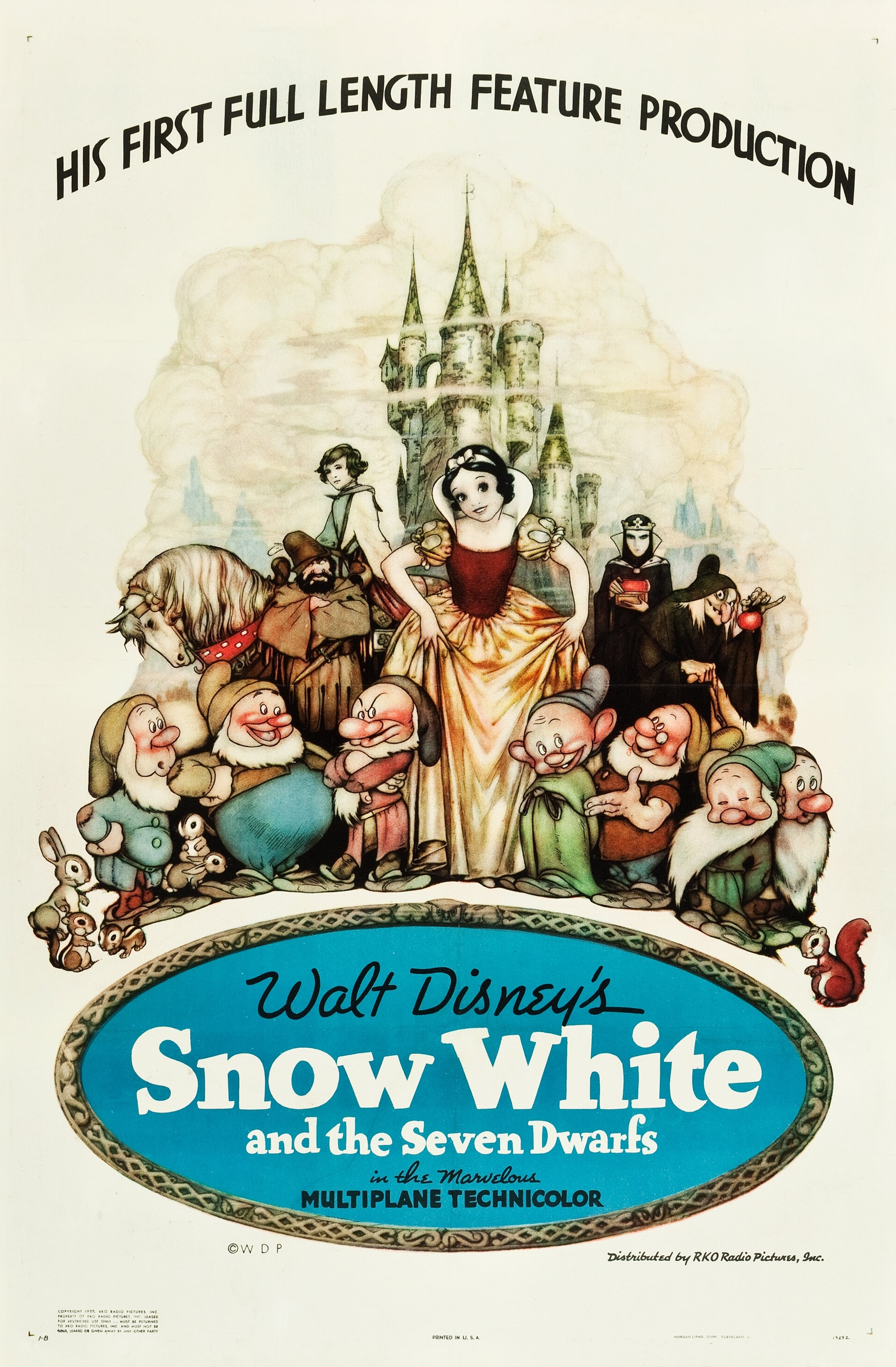
Poster for Snow White and the Seven Dwarfs

Release date	Film	Notes
January 1, 1937	That Girl from Paris	
January 8, 1937	We Who Are About to Die	
January 12, 1937	Racing Lady	Premiered in New York, wide release on January 29, 1937
January 15, 1937	The Plough and the Stars	
January 26, 1937	Criminal Lawyer	Premiered in New York, wide release on January 29, 1937
February 5, 1937	They Wanted to Marry	
February 11, 1937	We're on the Jury	Premiered in New York, wide release on February 12, 1937
February 19, 1937	When's Your Birthday?	
February 19, 1937	Sea Devils	
February 26, 1937	Park Avenue Logger	
March 5, 1937	Don't Tell the Wife	
March 12, 1937	China Passage	
March 26, 1937	Quality Street	
April 2, 1937	The Man Who Found Himself	
April 9, 1937	The Soldier and the Lady	
April 9, 1937	Too Many Wives	
April 16, 1937	The Outcasts of Poker Flat	
April 23, 1937	The Woman I Love	
April 30, 1937	You Can't Buy Luck	
May 7, 1937	Shall We Dance	
May 14, 1937	Behind the Headlines	
May 21, 1937	There Goes My Girl	
May 28, 1937	Hollywood Cowboy	
June 4, 1937	Border Cafe	
June 4, 1937	Meet the Missus	
June 18, 1937	Riding on Air	
June 25, 1937	You Can't Beat Love	
July 2, 1937	New Faces of 1937	
July 9, 1937	On Again-Off Again	
July 16, 1937	Super-Sleuth	
July 23, 1937	The Big Shot	
July 30, 1937	The Toast of New York	
August 6, 1937	Windjammer	
August 13, 1937	Hideaway	
August 20, 1937	Flight from Glory	
August 27, 1937	Make a Wish	
September 3, 1937	The Life of the Party	
September 10, 1937	Annapolis Salute	
September 24, 1937	Forty Naughty Girls	
October 8, 1937	Saturday's Heroes	
October 8, 1937	Stage Door	
October 8, 1937	Music for Madame	
October 15, 1937	Fit for a King	
October 22, 1937	Breakfast for Two	
October 29, 1937	There Goes the Groom	
November 5, 1937	Fight for Your Lady	
November 11, 1937	The Rat	Distribution only; premiered in London, wide release on January 21, 1938
November 12, 1937	Living on Love	
November 12, 1937	Victoria the Great (Note: Owned by StudioCanal)	Theatrical distribution only
November 19, 1937	A Damsel in Distress	
November 26, 1937	High Flyers	
December 3, 1937	Danger Patrol	
December 10, 1937	Quick Money	
December 21, 1937	Snow White and the Seven Dwarfs (Note: Owned by Disney (via Walt Disney Pictures))	Theatrical distribution only; premiered in Los Angeles, wide release on February 4, 1938; produced by Walt Disney Productions
December 24, 1937	Hitting a New High	
December 31, 1937	Wise Girl	
December 31, 1937	She's Got Everything	

=== 1938 ===
Profits for the studio fell again in 1938, on the release of 42 films, and the studio lost the talents of Katharine Hepburn, Joan Fontaine and Howard Hawks. However, they did gain the services of Garson Kanin. One of the biggest disappointments of the year was Bringing Up Baby. While today it is considered to be one of the finest comedies ever produced, at the time it was a box office flop. One of the few bright spots for RKO was the establishment of The Saint film series, which would run successfully through 1941.

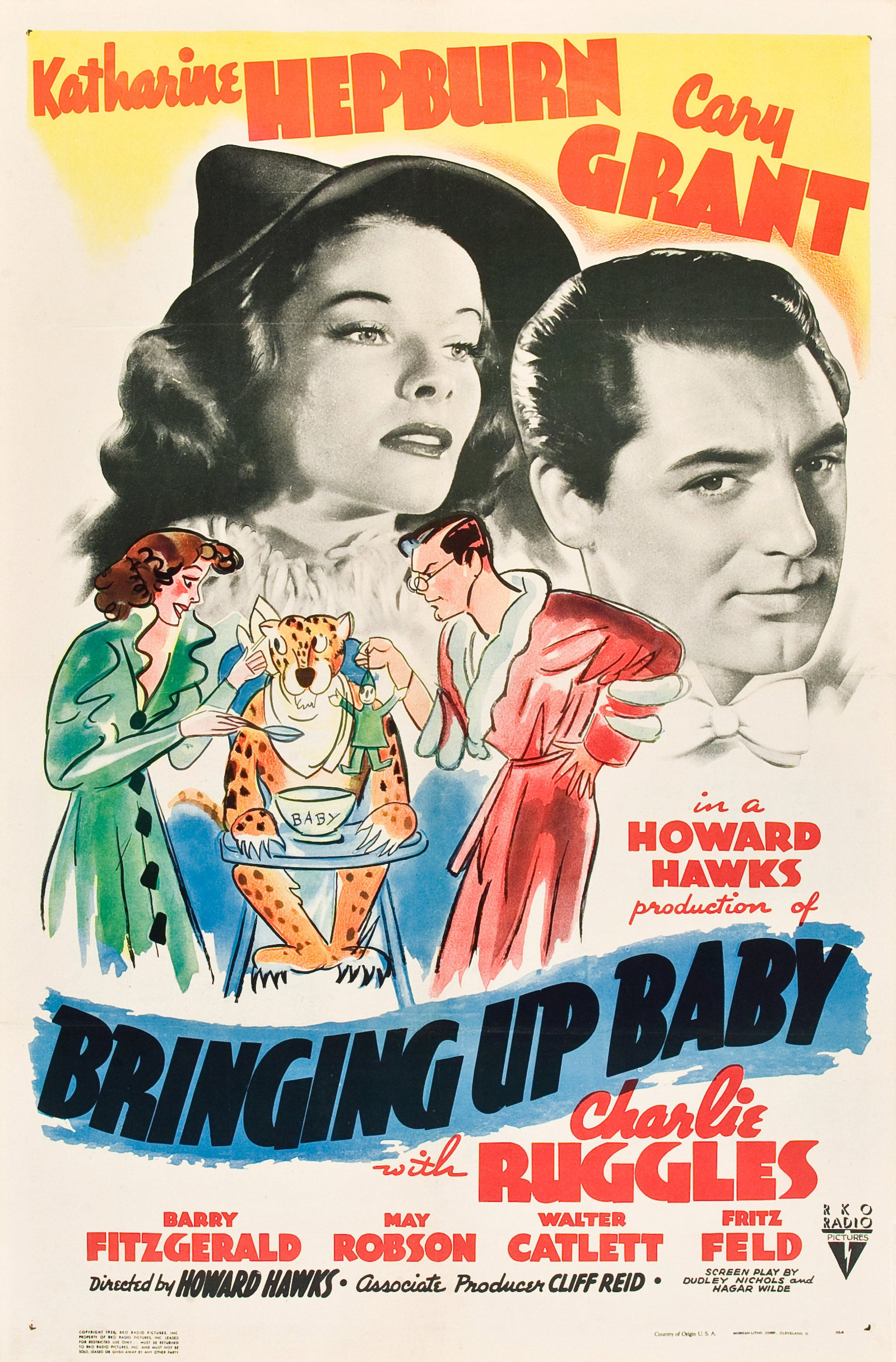
Poster for Bringing Up Baby

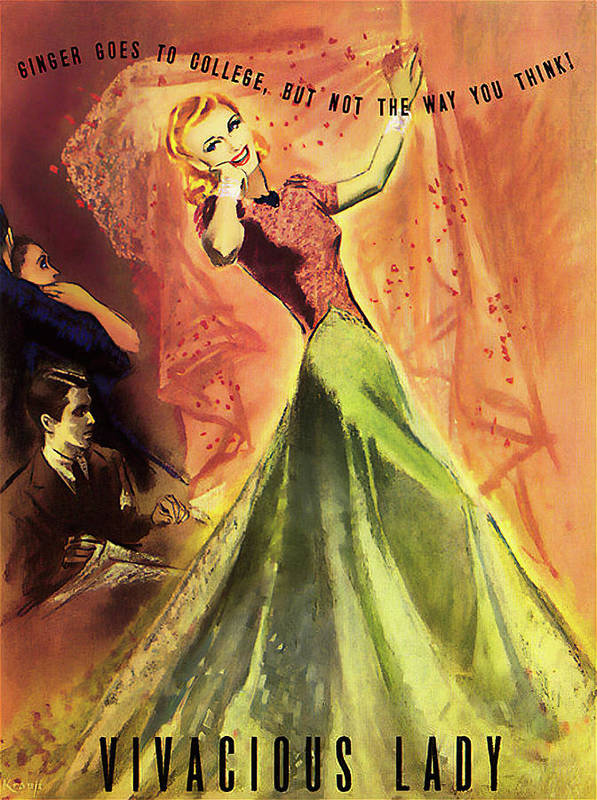
Poster for Vivacious Lady

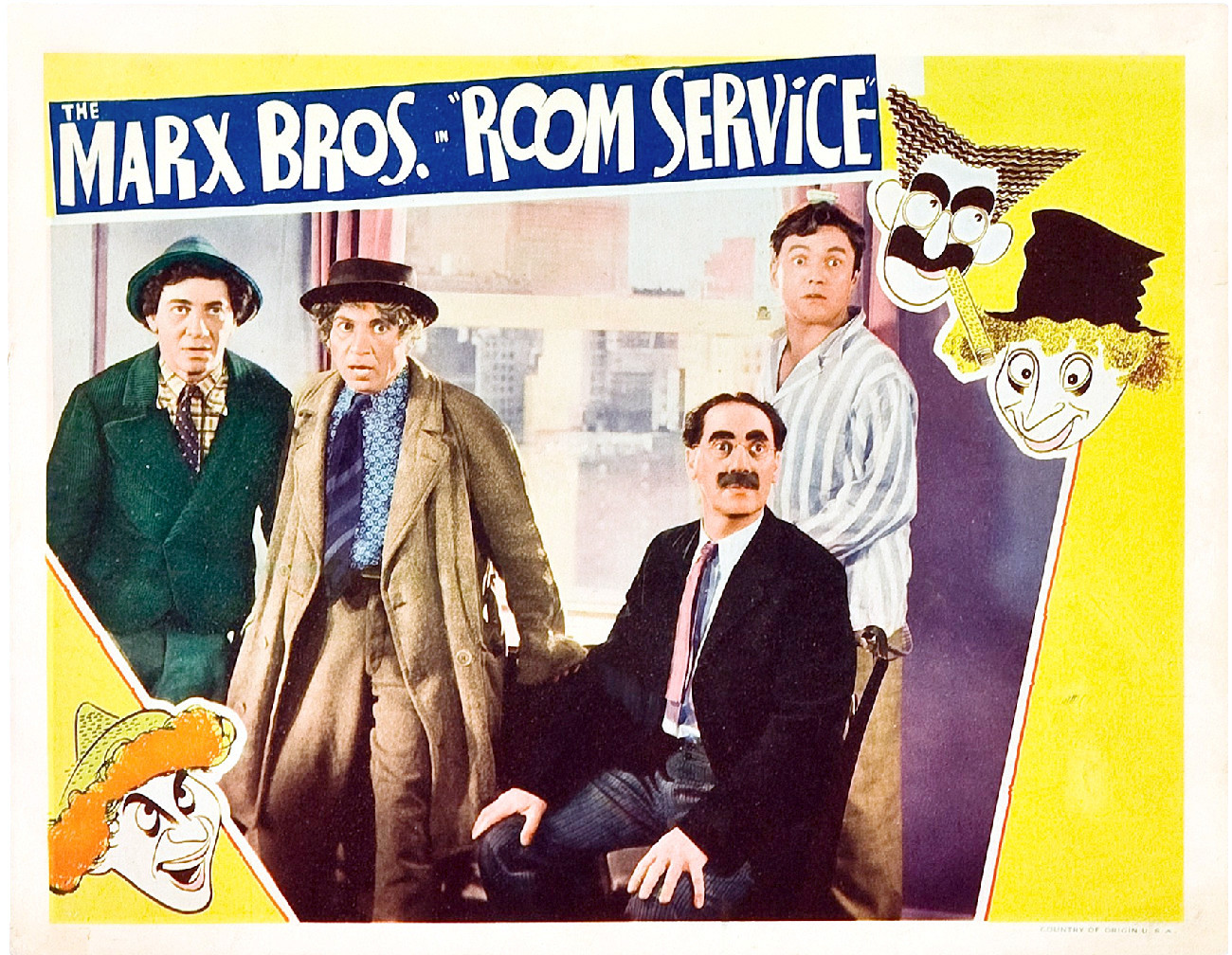
Lobby card for Room Service

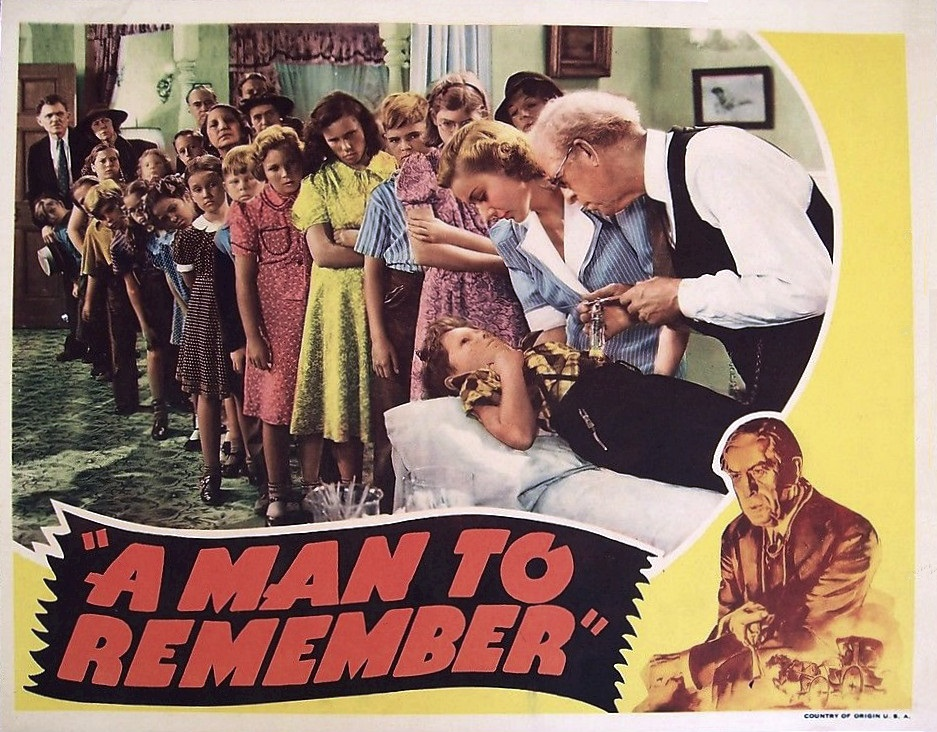
Lobby card for A Man to Remember

Release date	Film	Notes
January 7, 1938	Crashing Hollywood	
January 14, 1938	Everybody's Doing It	
January 18, 1938	Inside Nazi Germany	Distributor, The March of Time short
January 28, 1938	Double Danger	
February 11, 1938	Radio City Revels	
February 18, 1938	Bringing Up Baby	
February 25, 1938	Night Spot	
March 4, 1938	Maid's Night Out	
March 11, 1938	Hawaii Calls	
March 18, 1938	Condemned Women	
April 8, 1938	This Marriage Business	
April 22, 1938	Go Chase Yourself	
May 6, 1938	Law of the Underworld	
May 6, 1938	Joy of Living	
May 13, 1938	Vivacious Lady	
May 13, 1938	Gun Law	
May 20, 1938	Blind Alibi	
June 3, 1938	The Saint in New York	
June 17, 1938	Blond Cheat	
June 24, 1938	Border G-Man	
July 1, 1938	Having Wonderful Time	
July 8, 1938	Crime Ring	
July 22, 1938	Sky Giant	
July 29, 1938	Mother Carey's Chickens	
August 5, 1938	I'm From the City	
August 12, 1938	Painted Desert	
August 19, 1938	Smashing the Rackets	
August 26, 1938	Breaking the Ice	
September 2, 1938	Carefree	
September 9, 1938	The Affairs of Annabel	
September 16, 1938	The Renegade Ranger	
September 23, 1938	Fugitives for a Night	
September 30, 1938	Room Service	
October 7, 1938	Mr. Doodle Kicks Off	
October 14, 1938	A Man to Remember	
October 21, 1938	The Mad Miss Manton	
October 28, 1938	Tarnished Angel	
November 4, 1938	Lawless Valley	
November 11, 1938	Annabel Takes a Tour	
November 18, 1938	The Law West of Tombstone	
November 25, 1938	Peck's Bad Boy with the Circus	
December 9, 1938	Next Time I Marry	

=== 1939 ===
One of the biggest events for the studio this year was the signing of an agreement for Orson Welles to produce films for RKO. Even though 1939 was one of RKO's most creative years, with the release of 49 films, it ended the year showing a slight net loss. Highlights were Gunga Din, The Hunchback of Notre Dame, Love Affair, Allegheny Uprising, The Story of Vernon and Irene Castle (RKO's last Astaire/Rogers film), Five Came Back, In Name Only, Bachelor Mother, Nurse Edith Cavell, and The Flying Deuces.

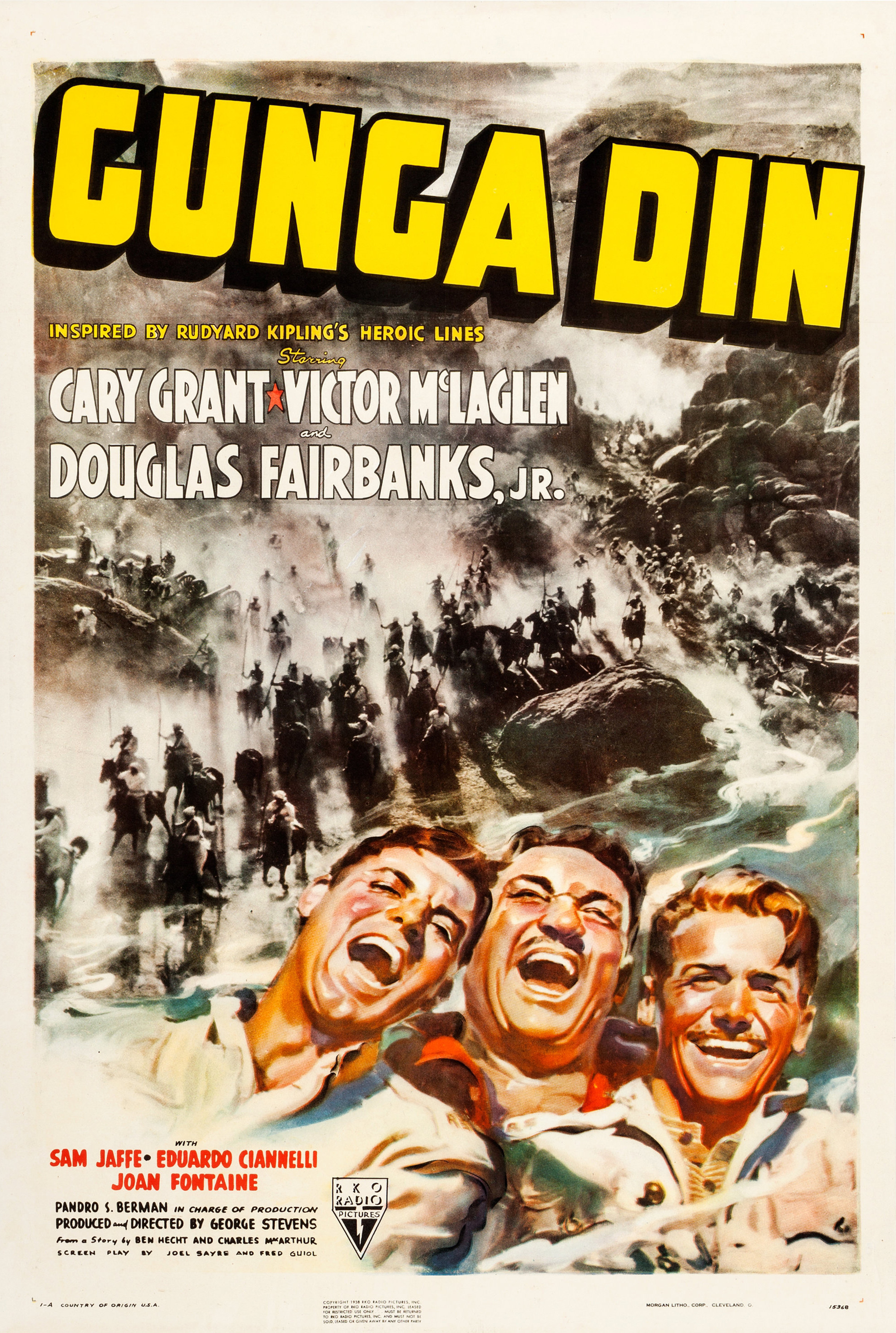
Poster for Gunga Din

Release date	Film	Notes
January 6, 1939	Pacific Liner	
January 13, 1939	The Great Man Votes	
January 20, 1939	Arizona Legion	
February 2, 1939	Boy Slaves	
February 3, 1939	Fisherman's Wharf	
February 17, 1939	Gunga Din	
February 24, 1939	Beauty for the Asking	
March 3, 1939	Twelve Crowded Hours	
March 10, 1939	The Saint Strikes Back	
March 24, 1939	Trouble in Sundown	
March 29, 1939	They Made Her a Spy	Premiered in New York, wide release on April 14, 1939
March 31, 1939	Almost a Gentleman	
April 7, 1939	Love Affair	Theatrical distribution only; currently in the public domain
April 7, 1939	The Flying Irishman	
April 21, 1939	Fixer Dugan	
April 28, 1939	The Story of Vernon and Irene Castle	
April 28, 1939	The Rookie Cop	
May 5, 1939	Sorority House	
May 12, 1939	Panama Lady	
May 26, 1939	Racketeers of the Range	
June 2, 1939	The Girl from Mexico	
June 16, 1939	The Girl and the Gambler	
June 23, 1939	Five Came Back	
June 30, 1939	Timber Stampede	
June 30, 1939	The Saint in London	
July 7, 1939	Career	
July 21, 1939	Way Down South	
July 28, 1939	The Spellbinder	
August 4, 1939	Bachelor Mother	
August 8, 1939	The Fighting Gringo	
August 18, 1939	In Name Only	
August 23, 1939	Conspiracy	Premiered in New York, wide release on September 1, 1939
August 28, 1939	Bad Lands	
September 8, 1939	Full Confession	
September 15, 1939	The Day the Bookies Wept	
September 22, 1939	Fifth Avenue Girl	Aka Fifth Avenue Girl
September 22, 1939	Nurse Edith Cavell (Note: Owned by Cohen Media Group)	Premiered in New York, wide release on September 29, 1939
October 6, 1939	Everything's on Ice	
October 13, 1939	Three Sons	
October 27, 1939	Sued for Libel	
November 3, 1939	The Marshal of Mesa City	
November 3, 1939	The Flying Deuces	Theatrical distribution only; produced by Boris Morros Productions
November 10, 1939	Allegheny Uprising	
November 17, 1939	Meet Dr. Christian	
November 24, 1939	That's Right – You're Wrong	
December 1, 1939	Reno	
December 8, 1939	Two Thoroughbreds	
December 22, 1939	Escape to Paradise	
December 29, 1939	The Hunchback of Notre Dame (Note: Currently in the public domain in the United States, although copyright is registered to Warner Bros. (via Turner Entertainment Co.))	

== The 1940s ==
This decade saw a continuation of the revolving door policy regarding management and creative talent at the studio, although RKO made it out of receivership in 1940. The quality of the films also increased overall, the studio receiving its second Oscar for Best Film, for 1946's The Best Years of Our Lives, as well as producing what many consider the greatest film of all time, Citizen Kane in 1941. Howard Hughes' takeover of the studio in 1948 would begin a downward spiral for RKO.

=== 1940 ===
RKO released 55 pictures during this year, of which they produced 39. The studio also premiered two others, Little Men and Fantasia, which did not go into wide release until 1941 and 1942 respectively. The studio lost the services of director George Stevens this year, and despite emerging from receivership, RKO would post an almost $1 million loss in 1940. Highlights of the year included Abe Lincoln in Illinois, My Favorite Wife, Irene, and Kitty Foyle (which won an Academy Award for Best Actress for Ginger Rogers). In addition, the studio continued its successful Saint series, and released two major successes from Walt Disney: Pinocchio and Fantasia.

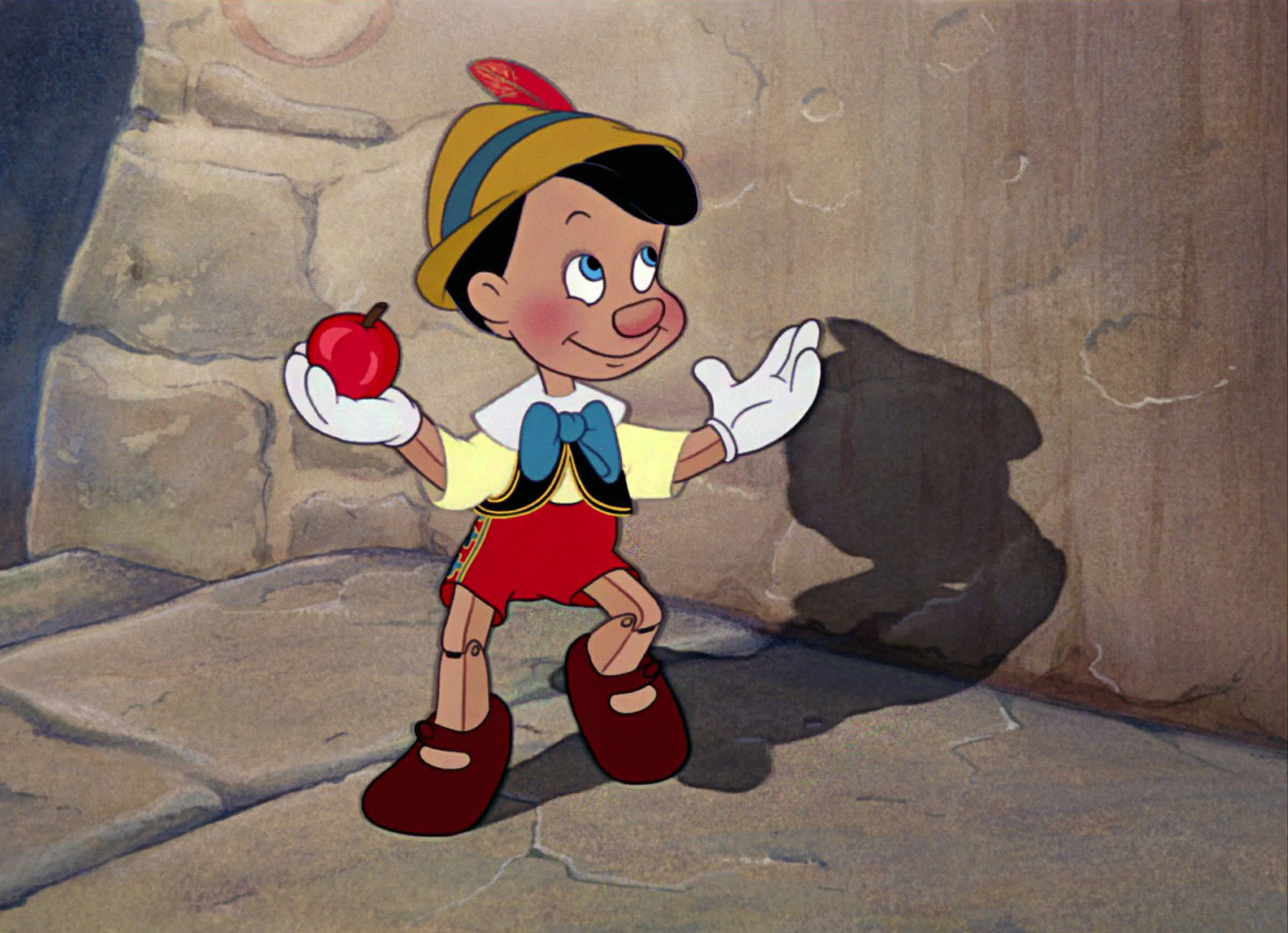
Screen capture from Pinocchio

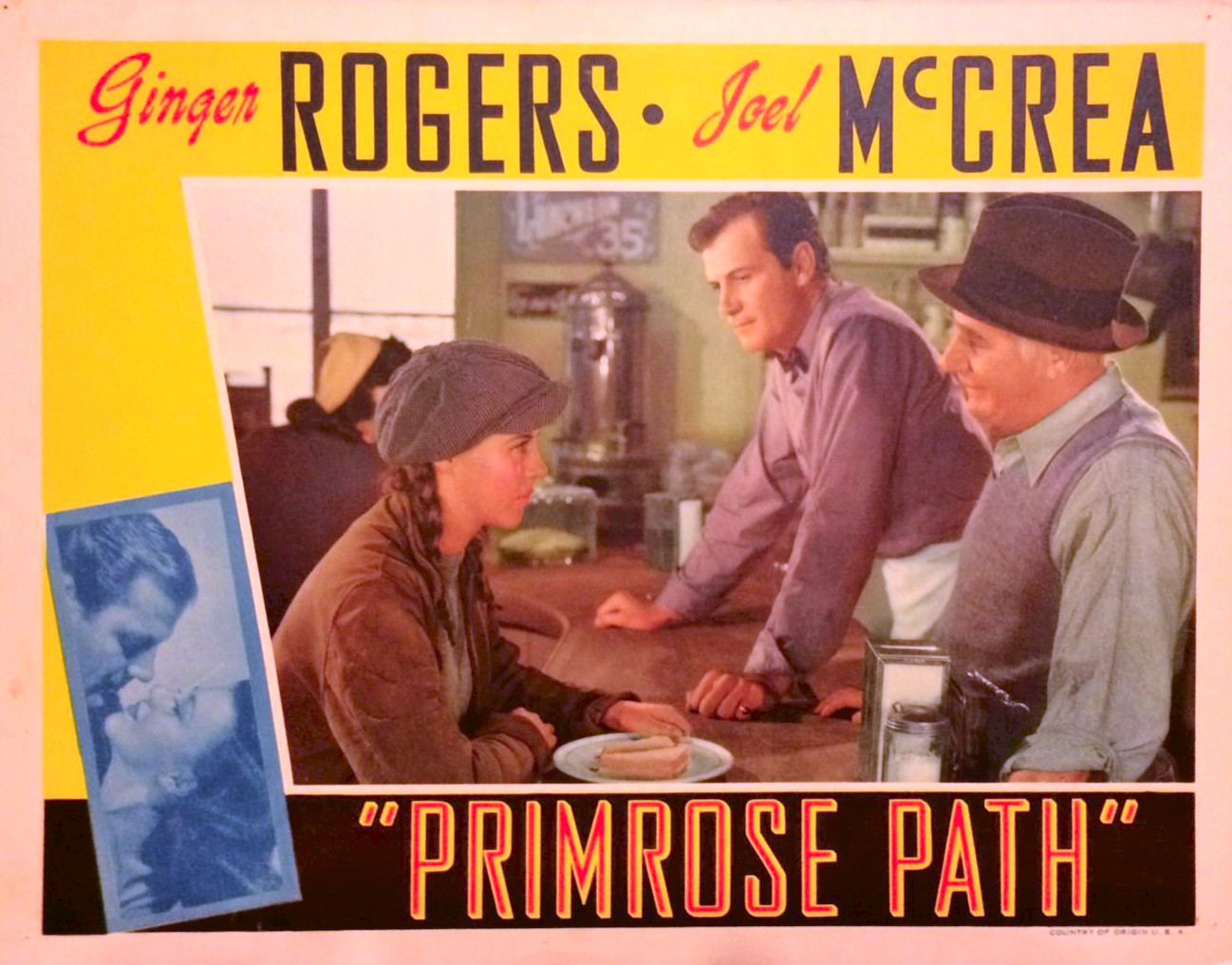
Lobby card for Primrose Path

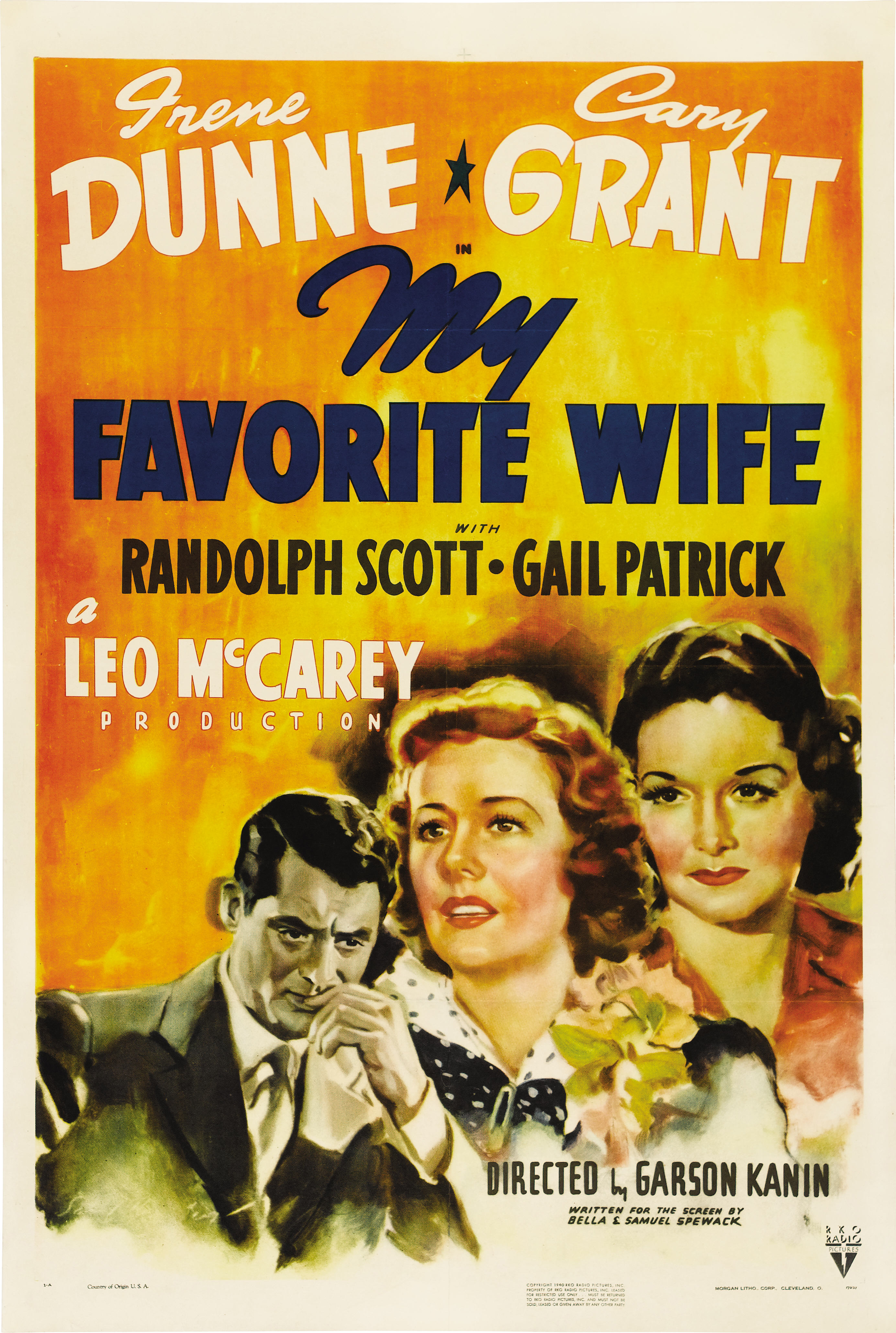
Poster for My Favorite Wife

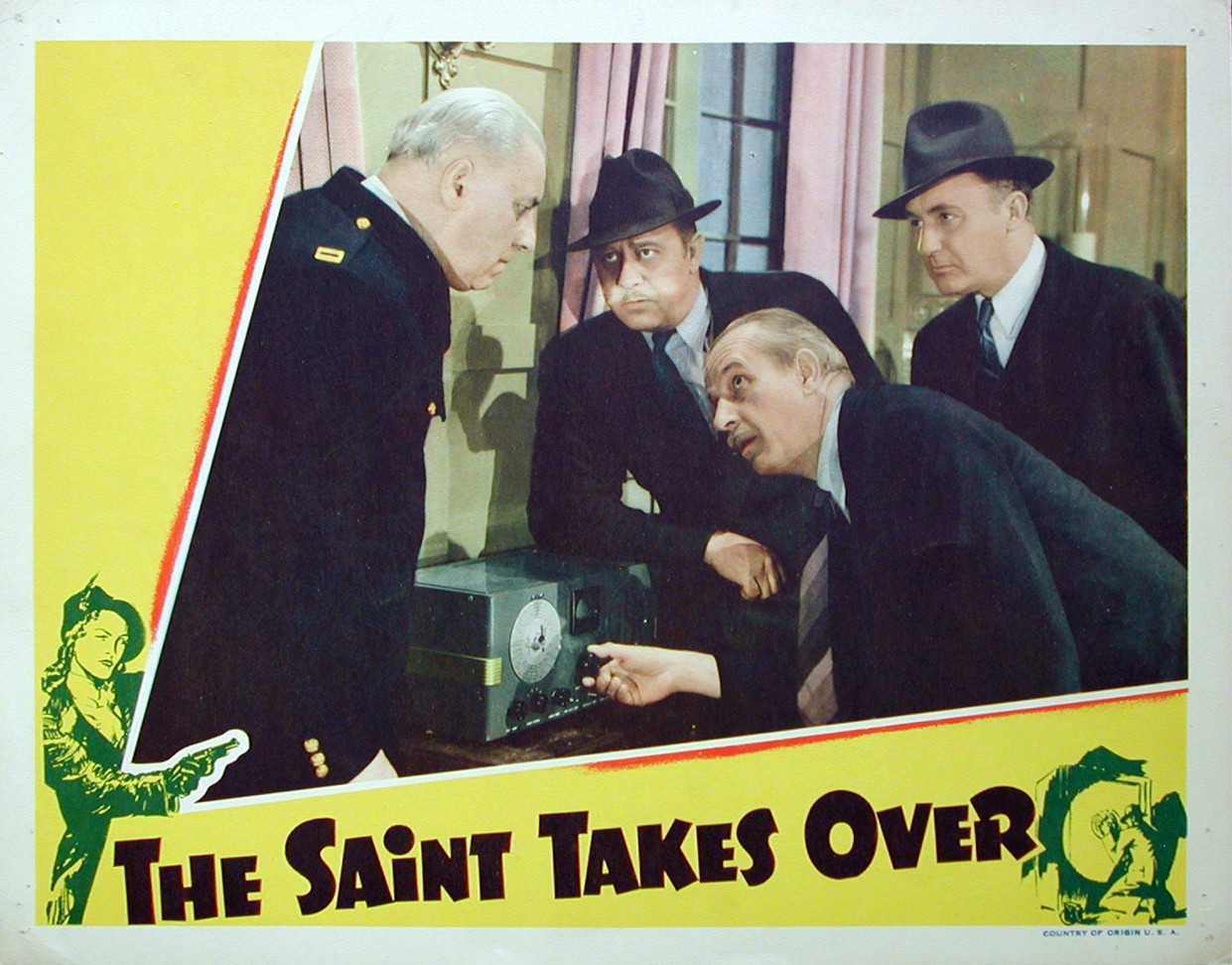
Lobby card for The Saint Takes Over

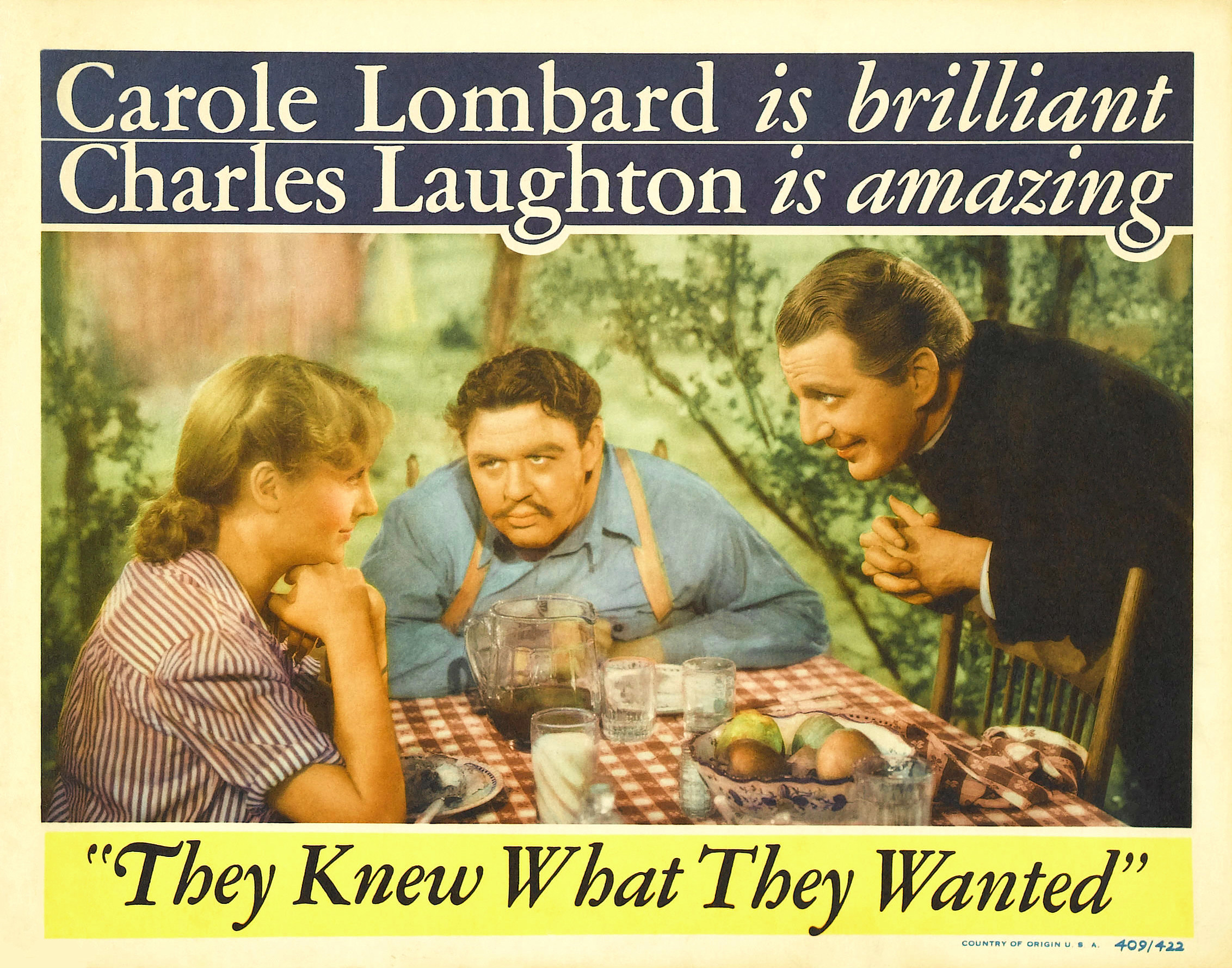
Lobby card for They Knew What They Wanted

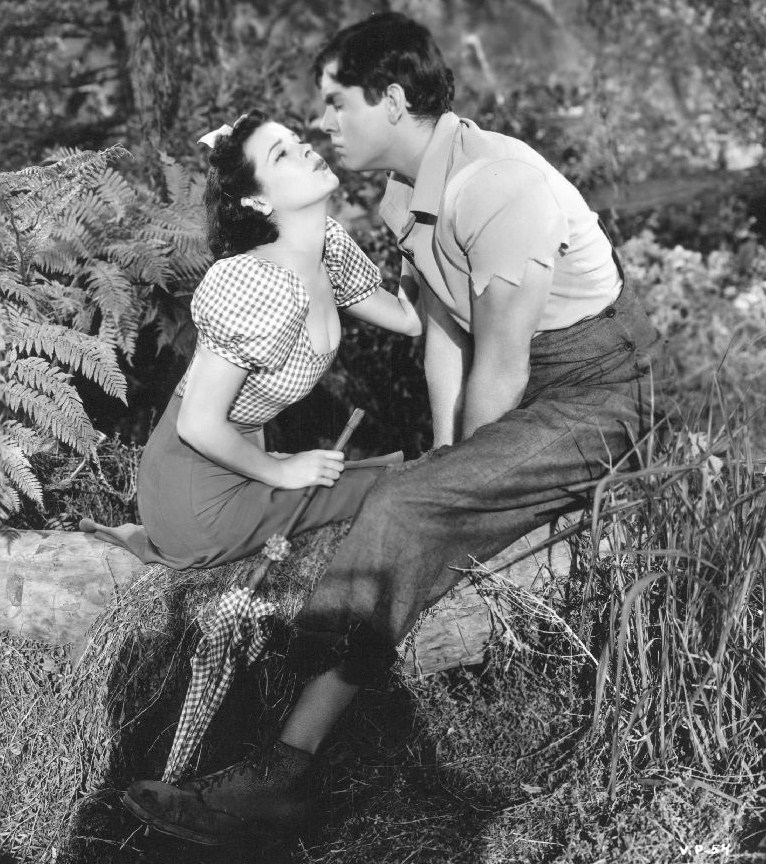
Billie Seward and Jeff York in Li'l Abner

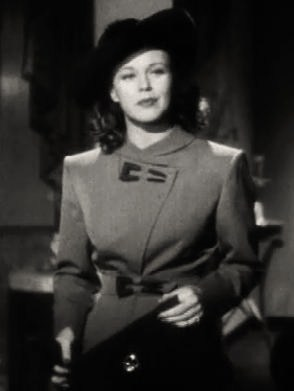
Ginger Rogers in Kitty Foyle

Release date	Film	Notes
January 5, 1940	Legion of the Lawless	
January 12, 1940	Mexican Spitfire	
January 19, 1940	Married and in Love	
January 26, 1940	The Saint's Double Trouble	
February 9, 1940	Vigil in the Night	
February 16, 1940	Swiss Family Robinson	Distribution only
February 23, 1940	Pinocchio	Theatrical distribution only; produced by Walt Disney Productions
March 1, 1940	Little Orvie	
March 7, 1940	The Marines Fly High	
March 8, 1940	Isle of Destiny	
March 15, 1940	Millionaire Playboy	
March 22, 1940	Primrose Path	
April 5, 1940	The Courageous Dr. Christian	
April 12, 1940	Bullet Code	
April 19, 1940	Abe Lincoln in Illinois	
April 26, 1940	Curtain Call	
May 3, 1940	Irene	
May 10, 1940	Beyond Tomorrow	
May 17, 1940	My Favorite Wife	
May 21, 1940	You Can't Fool Your Wife	
May 31, 1940	A Bill of Divorcement	
June 7, 1940	The Saint Takes Over	
June 14, 1940	Prairie Law	
June 21, 1940	Pop Always Pays	
June 28, 1940	Anne of Windy Poplars	
July 5, 1940	Dr. Christian Meets the Women	
July 12, 1940	Cross-Country Romance	
July 12, 1940	Millionaires in Prison	
July 19, 1940	Tom Brown's School Days	
July 26, 1940	Stage to Chino	
August 2, 1940	Queen of Destiny	
August 2, 1940	Lucky Partners	
August 9, 1940	One Crowded Night	
August 16, 1940	Stranger on the Third Floor	
August 16, 1940	The Ramparts We Watch	
August 23, 1940	Wildcat Bus	
August 30, 1940	Dance, Girl, Dance	
September 6, 1940	Men Against the Sky	
September 13, 1940	Dreaming Out Loud	
September 20, 1940	I'm Still Alive	
September 20, 1940	Triple Justice	
October 4, 1940	Wagon Train	
October 8, 1940	Too Many Girls	
October 11, 1940*	The Villain Still Pursued Her	
October 18, 1940	Laddie	
October 25, 1940	They Knew What They Wanted	
November 1, 1940	Li'l Abner	
November 13, 1940	Fantasia	Distribution only; produced by Walt Disney Productions; premiered in New York City, followed by a premiere in Los Angeles on January 29, 1941, and went into wide release on April 10, 1942
November 22, 1940	You'll Find Out	
November 29, 1940	Remedy for Riches	
November 29, 1940	Mexican Spitfire Out West	
December 6, 1940	The Fargo Kid	
December 7, 1940	Little Men	Premiered in New York city, wide release on January 10, 1941
December 13, 1940	No, No, Nanette	
December 27, 1940	Kitty Foyle	

=== 1941 ===
Citizen Kane trailer

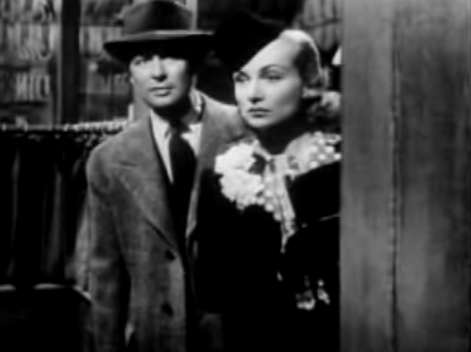
Robert Montgomery and Carole Lombard in Mr and Mrs Smith

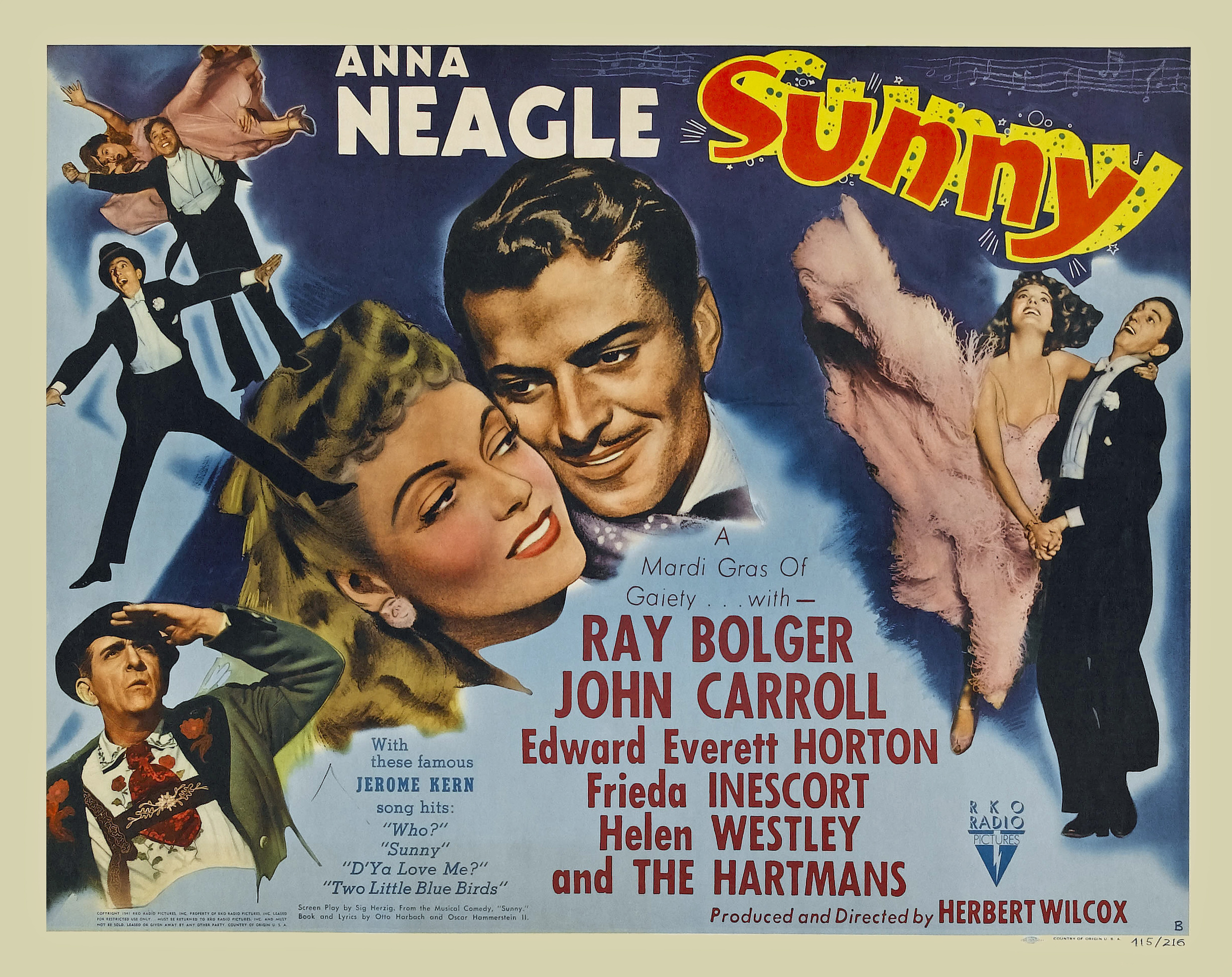
Lobby card for Sunny

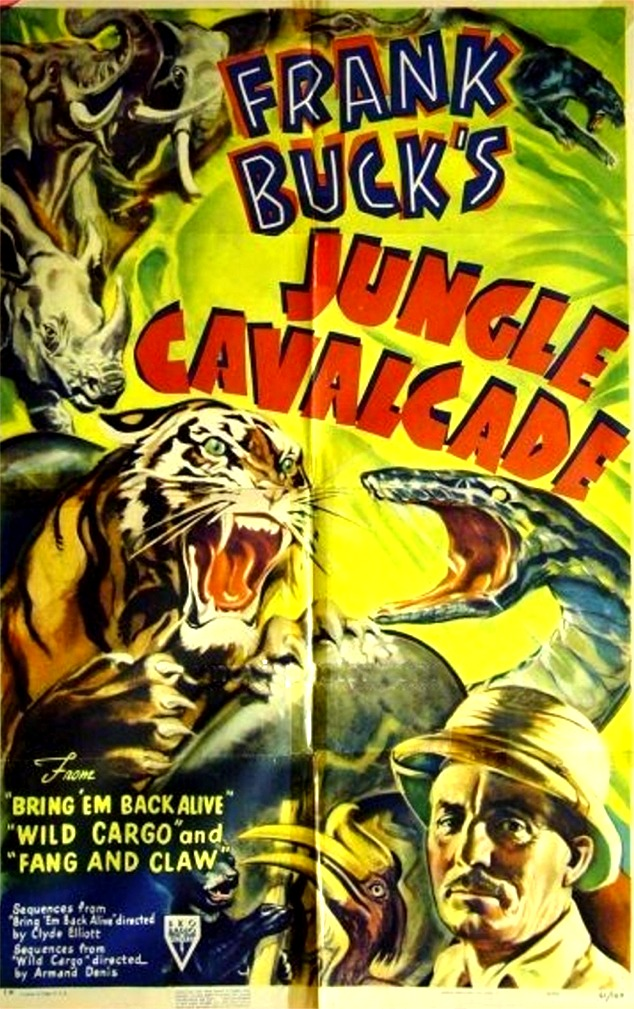
Poster for Jungle Cavalcade

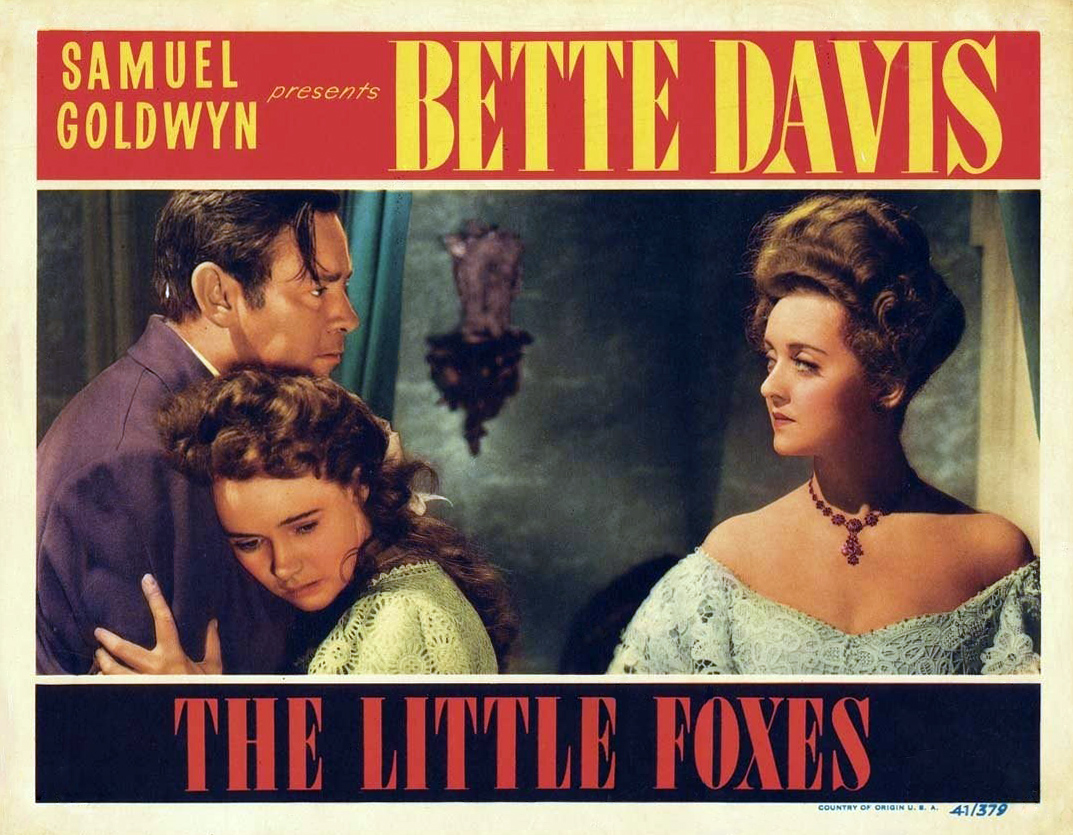
Theatrical poster for The Little Foxes

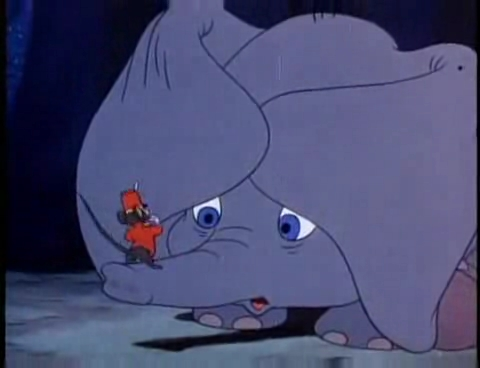
Dumbo from the 1941 Walt Disney animated film Dumbo.

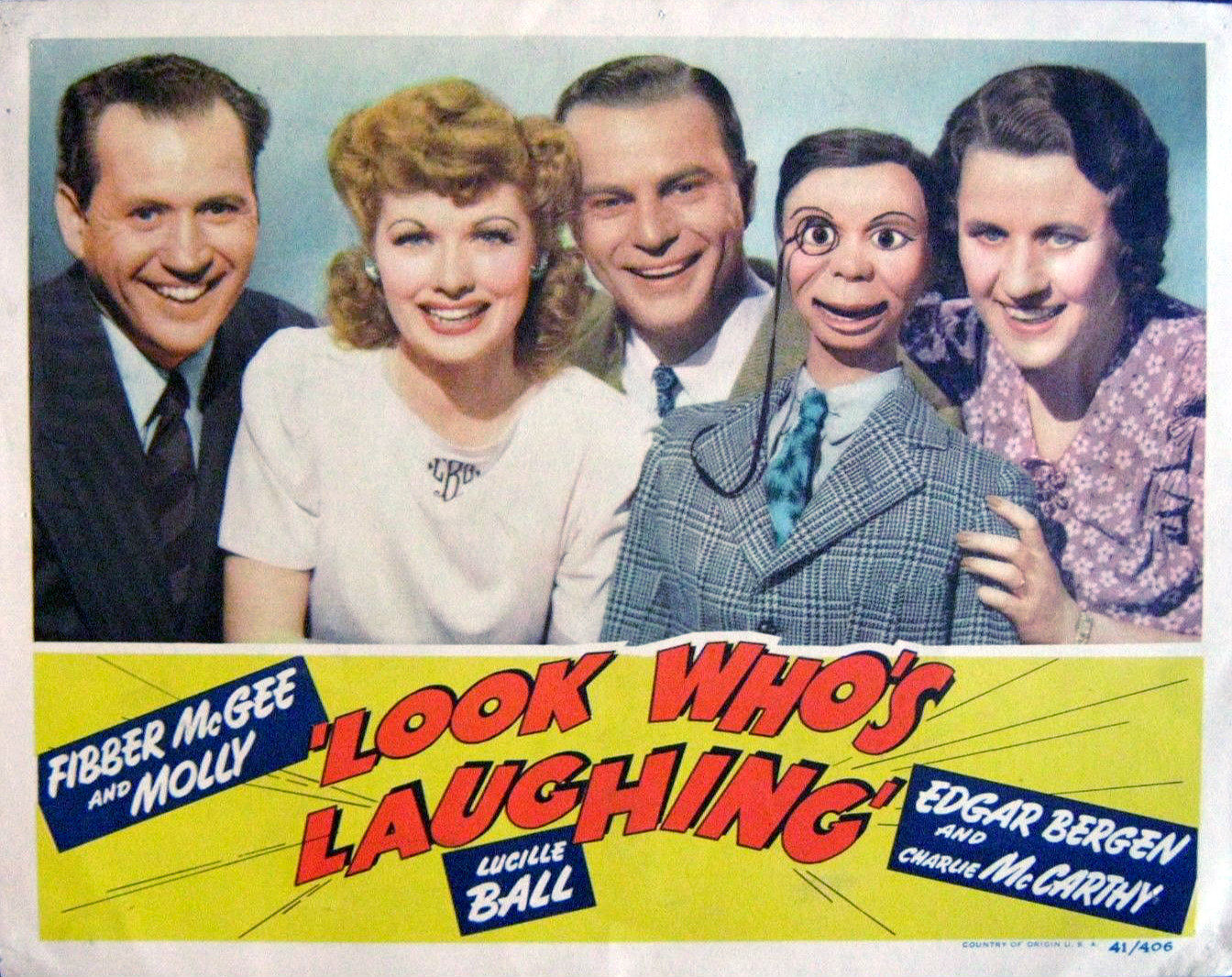
Lobby card for Look Who's Laughing

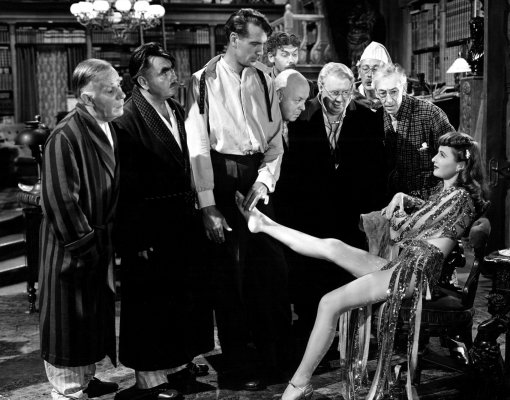
The main cast of Ball of Fire

RKO's year most likely will always be remembered for its release of Citizen Kane, which many consider to be the greatest film of all time. While the company saw a modest profit for the year, RKO lost the exclusive services of Ginger Rogers, the last great star of the studio, and Garson Kanin departed. Even the one bright spot, the signing of an agreement with the Samuel Goldwyn studios to distribute their films, was a double-edged sword, since the financial arrangements left little room for profits to be garnered by RKO. The studio released 45 films during the year, of which they produced 33. Highlights of the year, other than Citizen Kane, included Mr. and Mrs. Smith (a comedy directed by Alfred Hitchcock), the continuation of RKO's successful Saint franchise, The Devil and Miss Jones, The Little Foxes, Ball of Fire, Suspicion and Walt Disney's productions of The Reluctant Dragon and Dumbo; these last two were made, and one was released, in the midst of an animator strike at the Disney studio. A bit of trivia occurred this year when Bing Crosby's younger brother Bob made his film debut in Let's Make Music.

Release date	Film	Notes
January 3, 1941*	Convoy	Produced by Ealing Studios and released in 1940 in Great Britain
January 17, 1941	Let's Make Music	
January 24, 1941	The Saint in Palm Springs	
January 31, 1941	Mr. & Mrs. Smith	
February 7, 1941	Along the Rio Grande	
February 21, 1941	Scattergood Baines	
February 22, 1941*	It Happened to One Man	Premiered in Great Britain in October 1940
March 7, 1941*	Play Girl	
March 14, 1941	A Girl, a Guy and a Gob	
March 21, 1941	Footlight Fever	
March 28, 1941	Melody for Three	
April 4, 1941	Repent at Leisure	
April 11, 1941	The Devil and Miss Jones	
April 18, 1941	Robbers of the Range	
April 25, 1941	They Met in Argentina	
May 1, 1941	Citizen Kane	Co-produced with Mercury Theatre, premiered NYC, wide release on September 5, 1941
May 9, 1941	The Saint's Vacation	
May 23, 1941	Scattergood Pulls the Strings	
May 30, 1941	Sunny	
June 13, 1941	Tom, Dick and Harry	
June 13, 1941	Cyclone on Horseback	
June 13, 1941	Hurry, Charlie, Hurry	
June 27, 1941	The Reluctant Dragon	Distribution only; produced by Walt Disney Productions
June 27, 1941	Jungle Cavalcade	
July 11, 1941	They Meet Again	One of six films in the Dr. Christian series
July 18, 1941	The Story of the Vatican	Distribution, The March of Time short
August 1, 1941	My Life with Caroline	
August 8, 1941	Six-Gun Gold	
August 22, 1941	Scattergood Meets Broadway	
August 29, 1941	The Little Foxes (Note: Owned by the estate of Samuel Goldwyn, with U.S. distribution handled by Warner Bros. and international distribution handled by Miramax; Samuel Goldwyn Films also holds certain distribution rights)	Distribution only; produced by Samuel Goldwyn Productions
September 12, 1941	Parachute Battalion	
September 26, 1941	Lady Scarface	
September 1941	Norway in Revolt	Distribution, The March of Time feature
October 3, 1941	Father Takes a Wife	
October 10, 1941	The Bandit Trail	
October 17, 1941	The Devil and Daniel Webster	Aka All That Money Can Buy
October 24, 1941	The Gay Falcon	
October 31, 1941	Dumbo	Theatrical distribution only; produced by Walt Disney Productions
November 7, 1941	Unexpected Uncle	
November 14, 1941	Suspicion	
November 21, 1941	Look Who's Laughing	
November 28, 1941	The Mexican Spitfire's Baby	
December 2, 1941	Ball of Fire	Theatrical distribution only; produced by Samuel Goldwyn Productions released in December, before its premiere in NYC on January 9, 1942
December 12, 1941	Week-End for Three	
December 12, 1941	Dude Cowboy	
December 26, 1941	Playmates	

=== 1942 ===
In 1942, RKO was almost forced back into receivership, before Charles Koerner became head of production in March. The studio released 38 films in 1942, which included several films which they only distributed, such as another Walt Disney production, Bambi, which received mixed reviews at the time of its release, but has since been hailed as one of the hallmarks of Disney's animated canon. The year also saw the termination of the agreement between RKO and Orson Welles. There were few bright spots during the year, although one was the continuation of RKO's The Falcon series.

Trailer for The Magnificent Ambersons

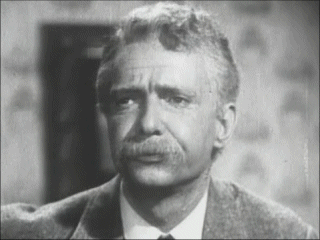
Chester Lauck in The Bashful Bachelor

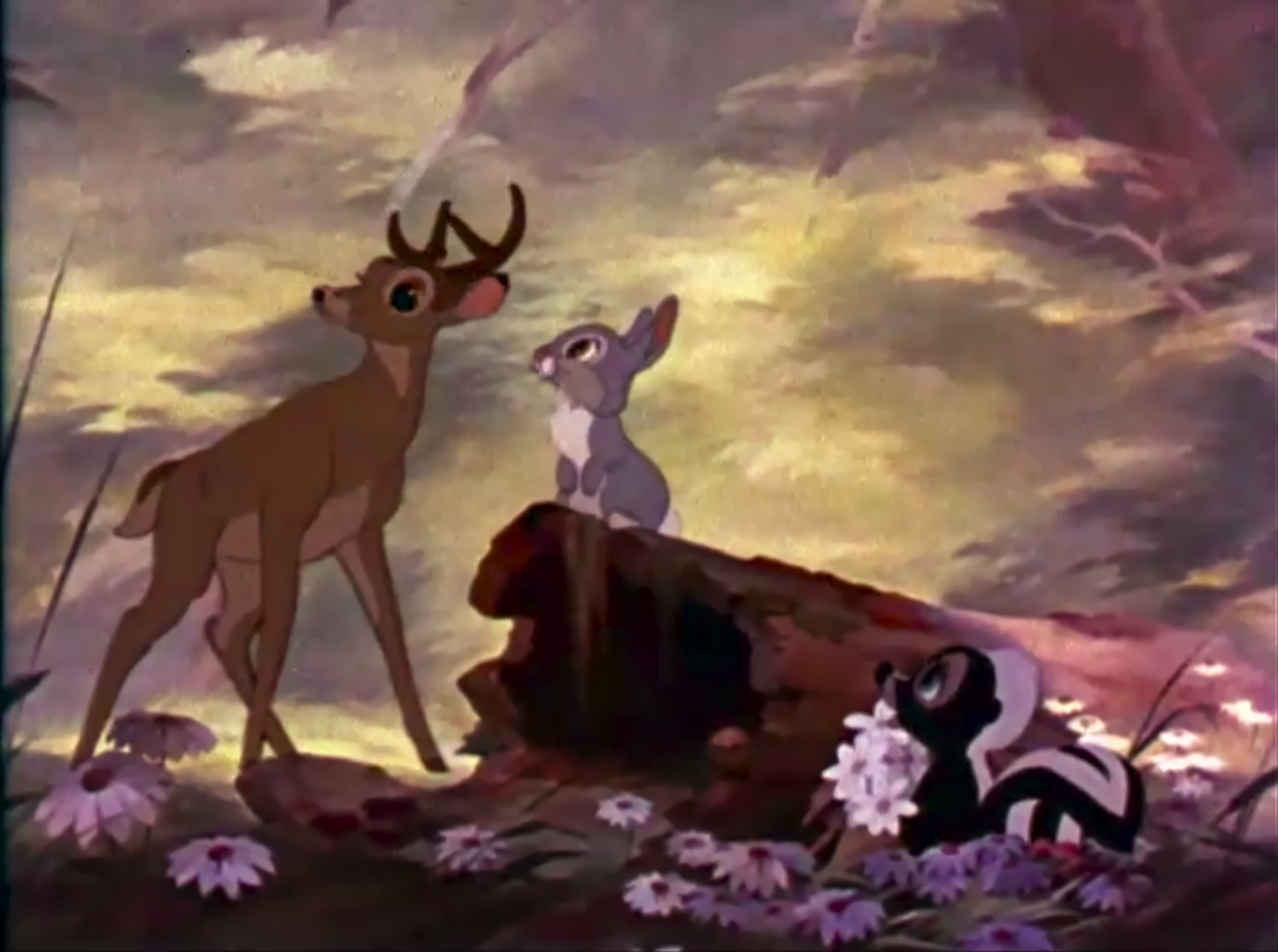
Screenshot from Bambi

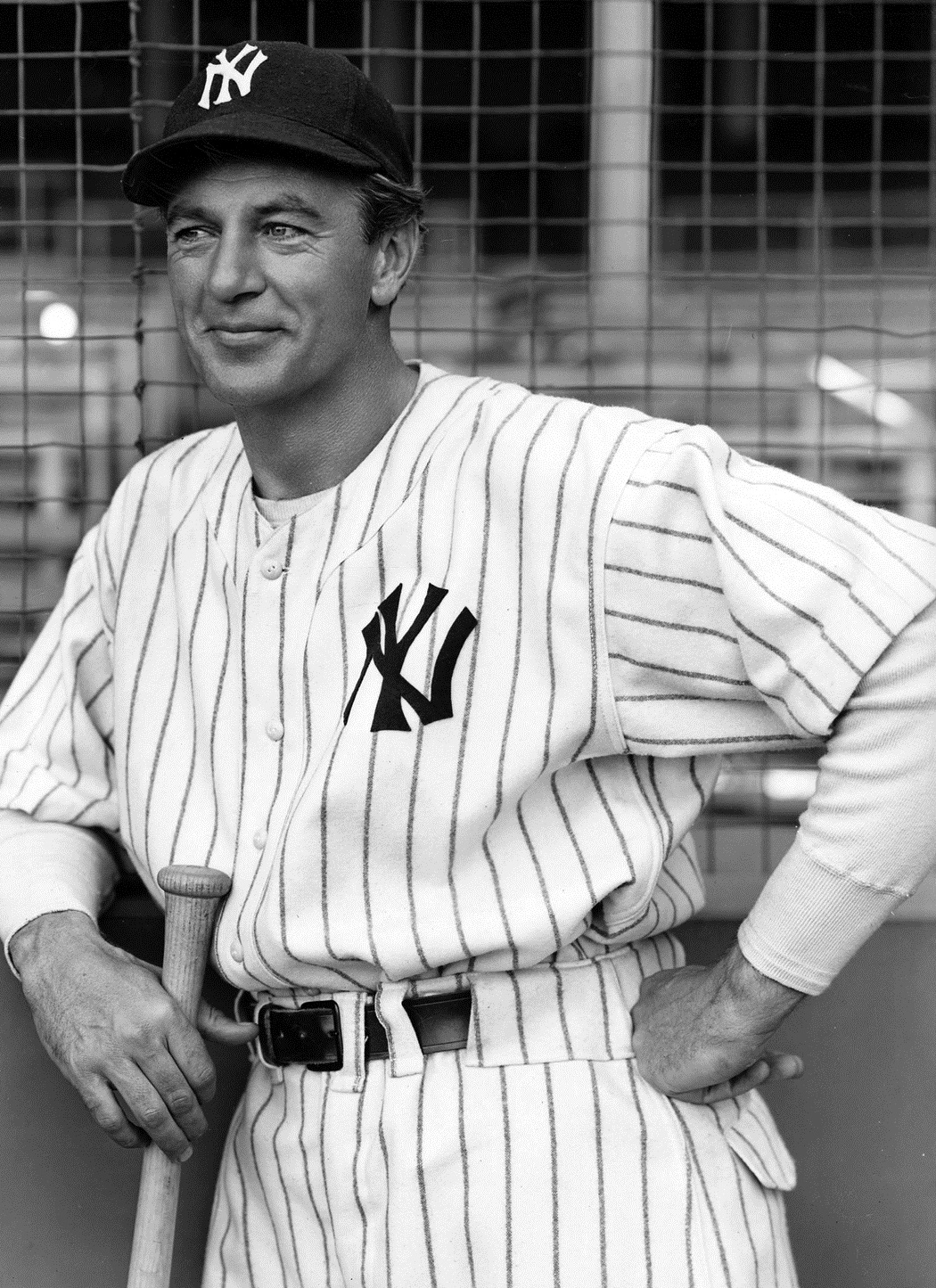
Publicity shot of Gary Cooper as Lou Gehrig in Pride of the Yankees

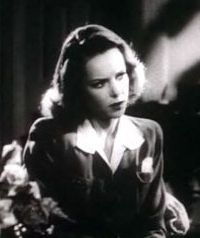
Jane Randolph in Cat People

Release date	Film	Notes
January 16, 1942	A Date with the Falcon	
January 23, 1942	Four Jacks and a Jill	
January 30, 1942	Obliging Young Lady	
February 6, 1942	Valley of the Sun	
February 13, 1942	Call Out the Marines	
February 20, 1942	Joan of Paris	
February 27, 1942	Riding the Wind	
March 6, 1942	Sing Your Worries Away	
March 13, 1942	Mexican Spitfire at Sea	
April 17, 1942	Land of the Open Range	
April 20, 1942	Suicide Squadron	Released June 27, 1941 in Great Britain as Dangerous Moonlight
April 24, 1942	The Bashful Bachelor	
May 1, 1942	The Tuttles of Tahiti	
May 8, 1942	Scattergood Rides High	
May 15, 1942	The Mayor of 44th Street	
May 22, 1942	Syncopation (Note: Owned by MGM (via United Artists))	
May 29, 1942	The Falcon Takes Over	
June 5, 1942	Come on Danger	
June 12, 1942	My Favorite Spy	
June 19, 1942	Powder Town	
June 26, 1942	Mexican Spitfire Sees a Ghost	
July 10, 1942	The Magnificent Ambersons	Co-produced with Mercury Theatre
July 14, 1942	The Pride of the Yankees	Distribution only; produced by Samuel Goldwyn Productions; Premiered in New York City and went into wide release on March 5, 1943
July 24, 1942*	Thundering Hoofs	
August 21, 1942	Bambi	Distribution only; produced by Walt Disney Productions
September 4, 1942	The Big Street	
September 11, 1942	Mexican Spitfire's Elephant	
September 18, 1942	Wings and the Woman	
September 25, 1942	Bandit Ranger	
October 2, 1942	Highways by Night	
October 9, 1942	Here We Go Again	
October 16, 1942	Scattergood Survives a Murder	
October 30, 1942*	The Navy Comes Through	
November 6, 1942	The Falcon's Brother	
November 6, 1942	Red River Robin Hood	
November 13, 1942	Seven Days' Leave	
November 18, 1942	Seven Miles from Alcatraz	Premiered in New York City and went into wide release on January 8, 1943
November 27, 1942	Once Upon a Honeymoon	
November 20, 1942	Pirates of the Prairie	
December 4, 1942	Army Surgeon	
December 17, 1942	The Great Gildersleeve	
December 25, 1942	Cat People	

=== 1943 ===
1943 was a very profitable year for the studio, with 43 of the 46 films that were released during the year showing profits. The year also saw a few critical successes, such as Mr. Lucky, They Got Me Covered, Hitler's Children, and Behind the Rising Sun.

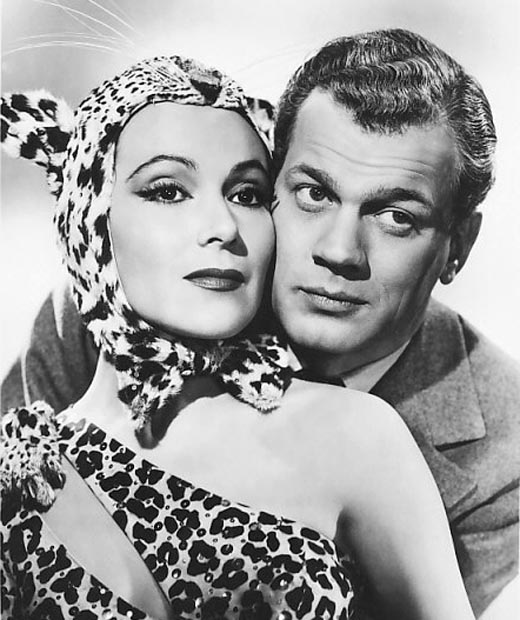
Dolores del Río and Joseph Cotten in Journey Into Fear

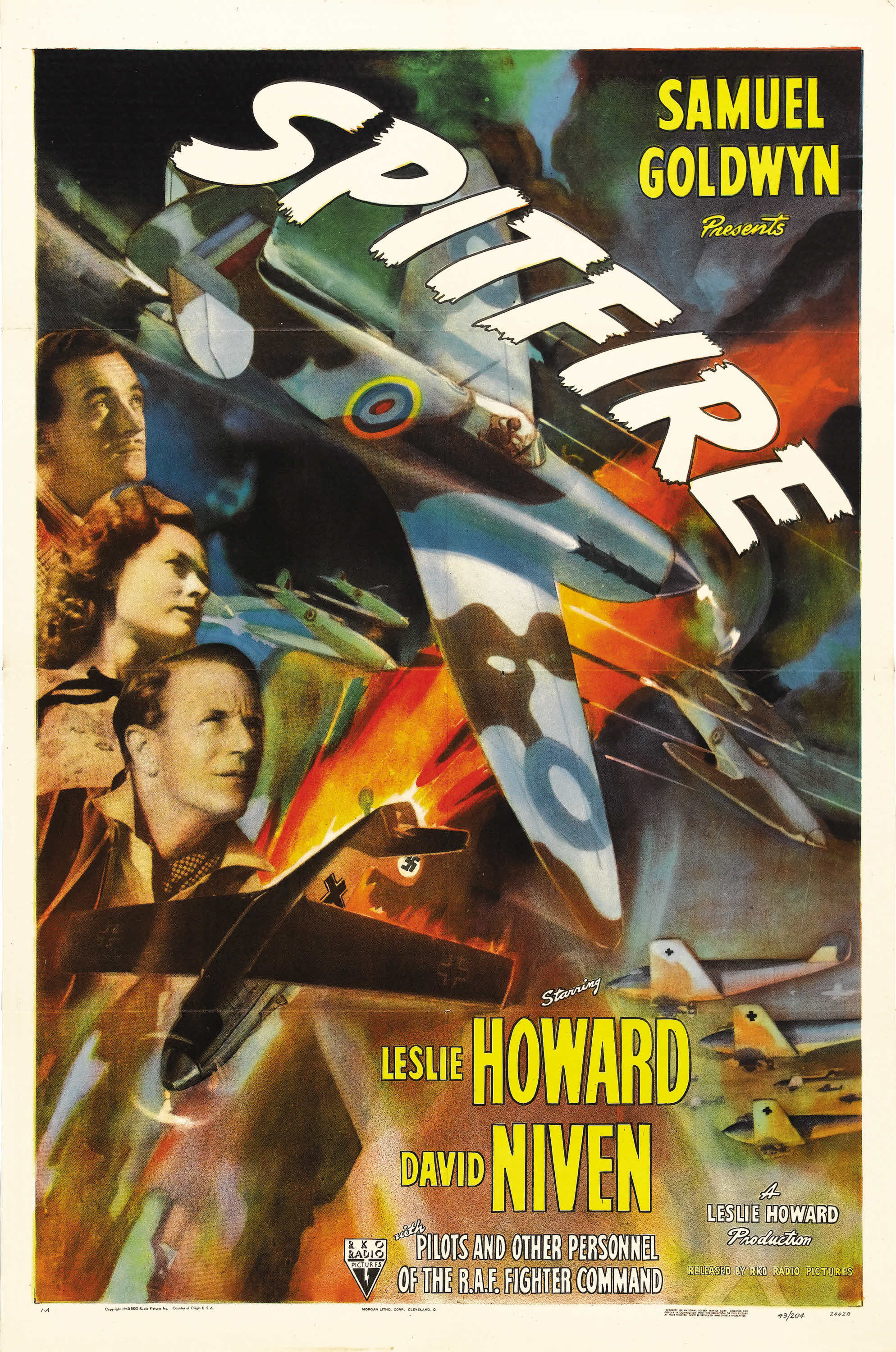
Poster for Spitfire

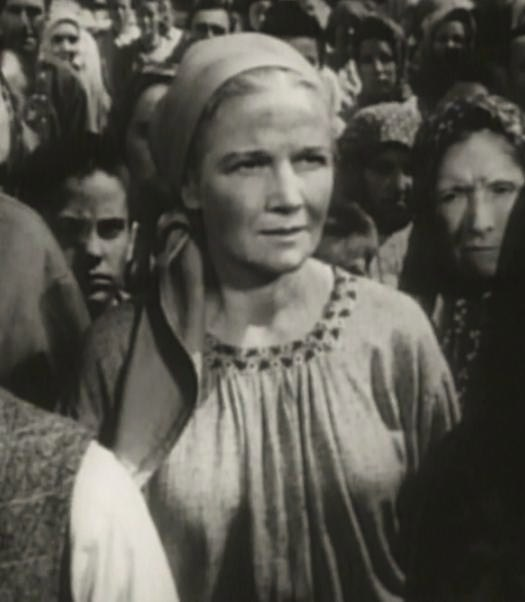
Ann Harding in The North Star

Release date	Film	Notes
January 14, 1943	Hitler's Children	Premiered in Cincinnati, OH; wide release March 19, 1943
January 15, 1943	Fighting Frontier	
January 22, 1943*	Cinderella Swings It	
January 27, 1943	They Got Me Covered	Distribution only; produced by Samuel Goldwyn Productions; premiered in San Francisco, wide release February 5, 1943
February 6, 1943	Saludos Amigos	World premiere in Rio de Janeiro, August 24, 1942; US premiere in Boston, with wide release on February 19, 1943; distribution only; produced by Walt Disney Productions
February 12, 1943	Journey into Fear	
February 19, 1943	Tarzan Triumphs	
February 26, 1943	Two Weeks to Live	
March 26, 1943	Forever and a Day	
March 26, 1943	Ladies' Day	Premiered in New York City, wide release April 9, 1943
April 1, 1943	The Falcon Strikes Back	Premiered in New York City, wide release May 7, 1943
April 2, 1943	Flight for Freedom	
April 2, 1943	Sagebrush Law	
April 21, 1943	I Walked with a Zombie	Premiered in New York City, wide release April 30, 1943
May 8, 1943	The Leopard Man	
May 10, 1943	Squadron Leader X	Premiered March 1, 1943 in the U.K.
May 14, 1943	Bombardier	
May 20, 1943*	The Avenging Rider	
May 28, 1943	Mr. Lucky	
June 10, 1943	Gildersleeve's Bad Day	
June 12, 1943	Spitfire	Premiered in the U.K. (as The First of the Few) on September 14, 1942
July 17, 1943*	The Falcon in Danger	
July 17, 1943*	Mexican Spitfire's Blessed Event	
July 17, 1943*	Petticoat Larceny	
July 29, 1943	The Saint Meets the Tiger	
August 1, 1943*	Behind the Rising Sun	
August 17, 1943	So This is Washington	
August 19, 1943	The Fallen Sparrow	
August 20, 1943	The Adventures of a Rookie	
August 21, 1943	The Seventh Victim	
September 2, 1943	The Sky's the Limit	
September 15, 1943	A Lady Takes a Chance	
October 25, 1943	The Iron Major	
October 28, 1943*	Gildersleeve on Broadway	
November 4, 1943*	The North Star	Distribution only; produced by Samuel Goldwyn Productions
November 10, 1943*	The Falcon and the Co-eds	
December 16, 1943	Gangway for Tomorrow	
December 24, 1943	The Ghost Ship	
December 26, 1943	Tarzan's Desert Mystery	
December 29, 1943	Tender Comrade	
November 24, 1943	Around the World	
December 1943*	Rookies in Burma	
May 7, 1943	This Land Is Mine	

=== 1944 ===
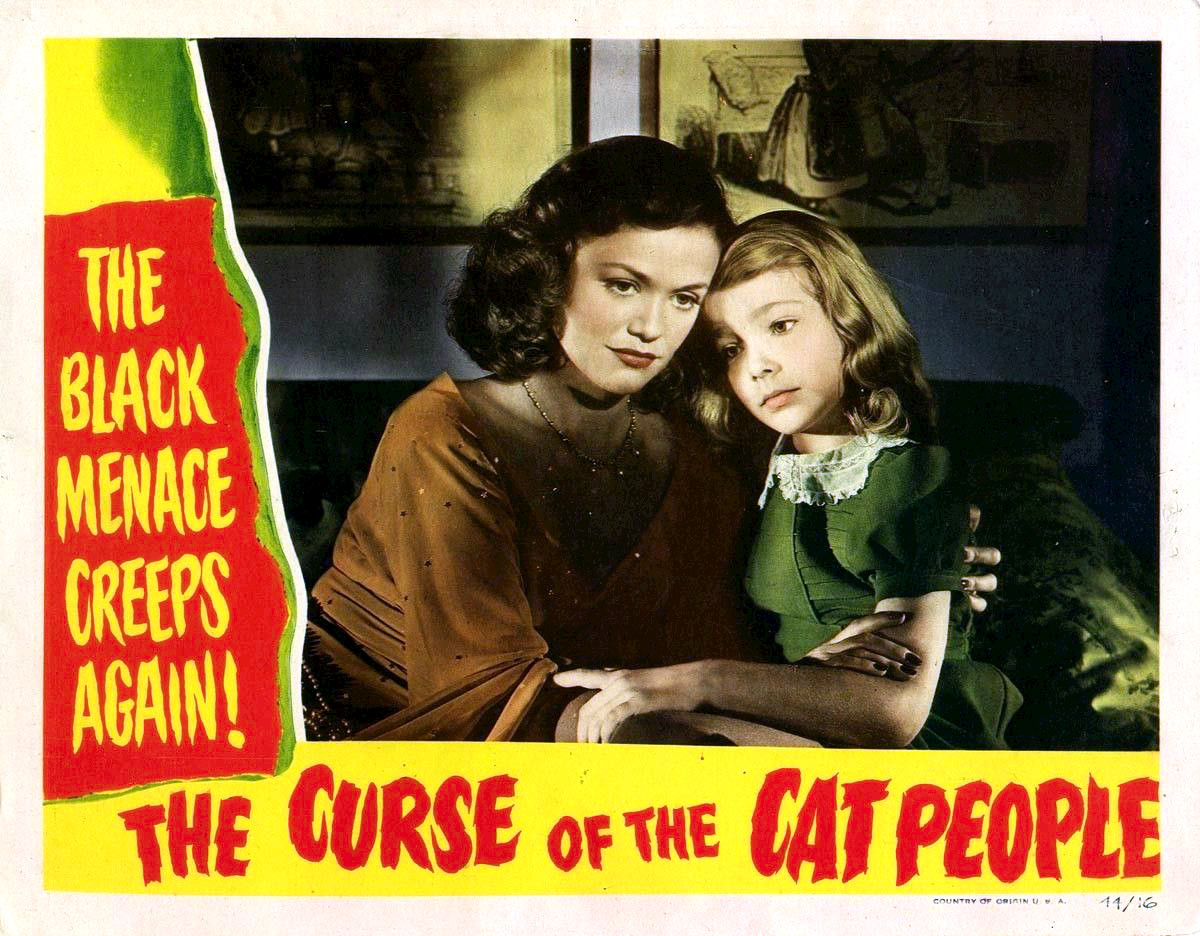
Lobby card for The Curse of the Cat People

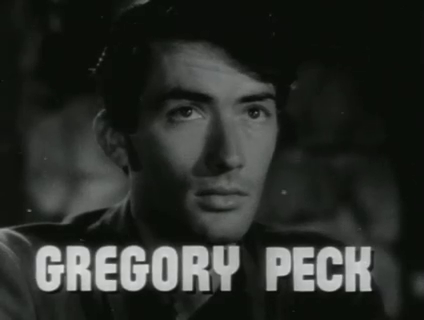
Gregory Peck's title card from Days of Glory

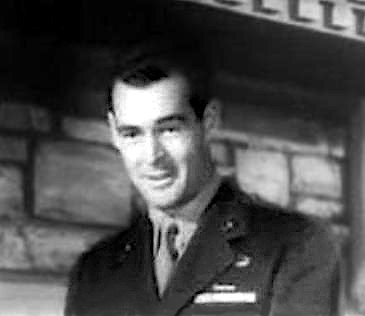
Robert Ryan in Marine Raiders

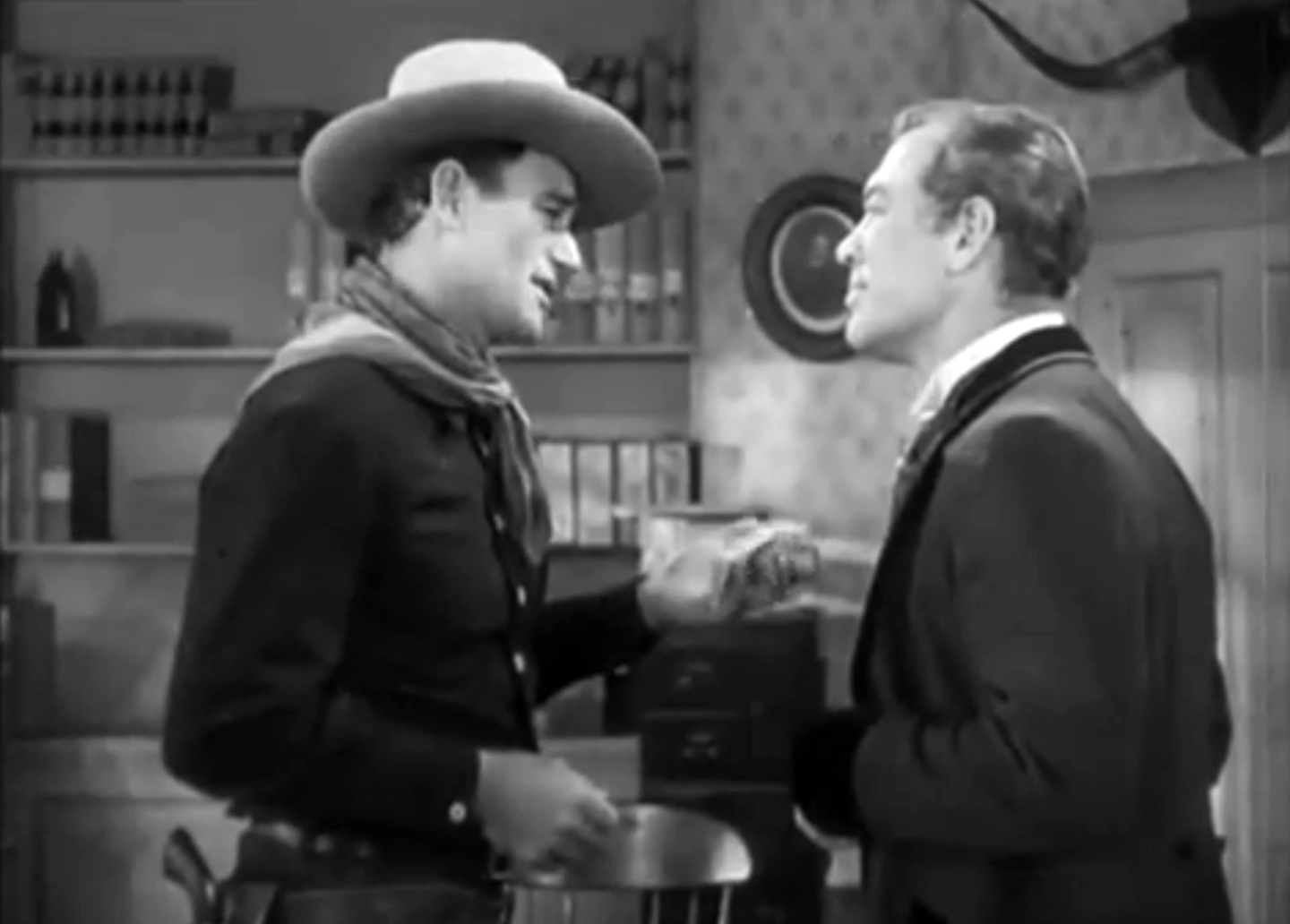
John Wayne and Ward Bond in Tall in the Saddle

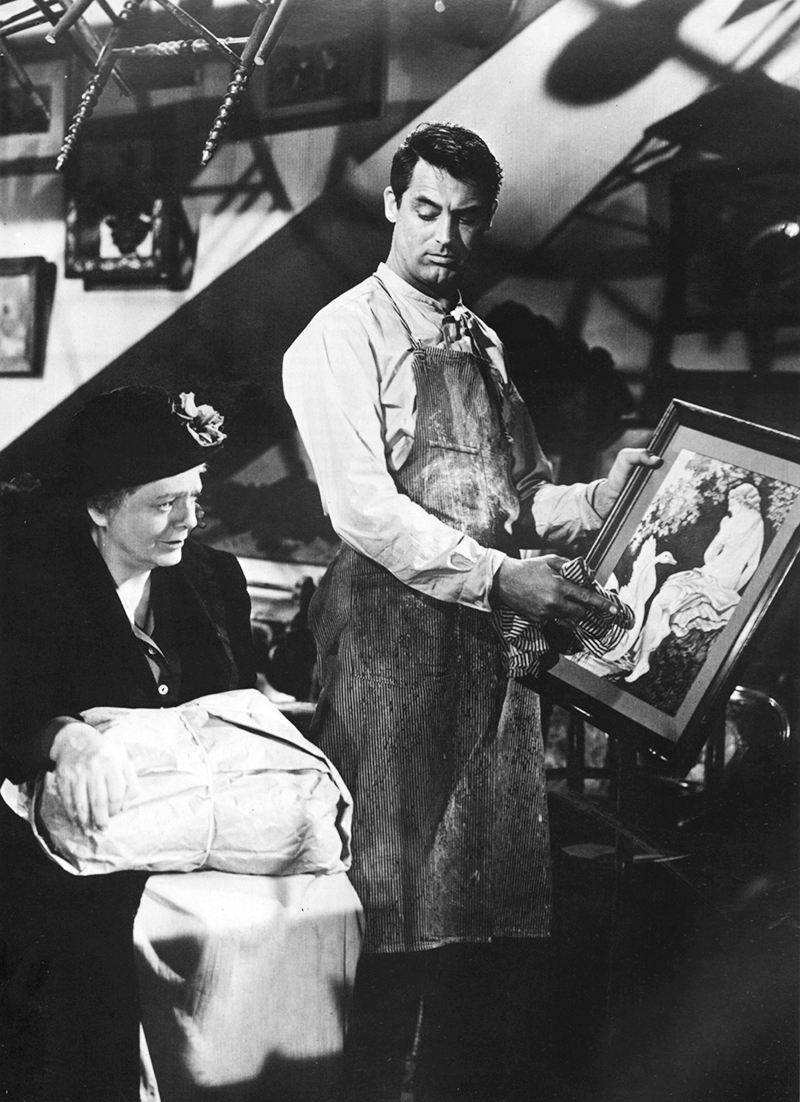
Ethel Barrymore and Cary Grant in None but the Lonely Heart

1944 was another profitable year for the studio, which released 36 films. In addition, there were quite a few notable occurrences for RKO that year. First, they entered into an agreement to release the films by the independent production house, International Pictures; second, two major stars would make their film debuts — Robert Mitchum and Gregory Peck; and third, several notable writers would make their initial foray into directing: Clifford Odets, Howard Estabrook, and Herbert Biberman. The studio's film highlights of 1944 included Higher and Higher (Frank Sinatra's first film lead), The Princess and the Pirate, Tall in the Saddle, Murder, My Sweet, The Woman in the Window, and None But the Lonely Heart.

Release date	Film	Notes
January 1, 1944	Higher and Higher	
January 6, 1944	Government Girl	
February 14, 1944	Escape to Danger	World premiere in London on July 22, 1943
February 18, 1944	Action in Arabia	
February 17, 1944	Up in Arms	Distribution only; produced by Samuel Goldwyn Productions
February 25, 1944	Passport to Destiny	
March 2, 1944	The Curse of the Cat People	
March 17, 1944	The Falcon Out West	
April 13, 1944	Yellow Canary	World premiere in London on October 19, 1943
April 18, 1944	Coastal Command	
April 25, 1944	Seven Days Ashore	
May 10, 1944	Show Business	
June 8, 1944	Days of Glory	
June 9, 1944	A Night of Adventure	
June 30, 1944	Marine Raiders	
July 26, 1944	Step Lively	
July 28, 1944	Mademoiselle Fifi	
August 23, 1944	Casanova Brown	World premiere in Western France, just after its liberation in World War II, on August 5, 1944
September 1, 1944	Youth Runs Wild	
September 5, 1944	Gildersleeve's Ghost	
September 15, 1944	Bride by Mistake	
September 29, 1944	Tall in the Saddle	
September 1944	Goin' to Town	
October 6, 1944	Music in Manhattan	
October 8, 1944	My Pal Wolf	
October 17, 1944	None but the Lonely Heart	
October 18, 1944	The Master Race	
October 20, 1944	Heavenly Days	
October 25, 1944	Girl Rush	
November 3, 1944	The Woman in the Window	Distribution only; produced by International Pictures
November 4, 1944	The Falcon in Mexico	
November 17, 1944	The Princess and the Pirate	Distribution only; produced by Samuel Goldwyn Productions
December 8, 1944	The Falcon in Hollywood	
December 9, 1944	Murder, My Sweet	
December 20, 1944	Nevada	
December 27, 1944	Belle of the Yukon	
December 29, 1944	Experiment Perilous	

=== 1945 ===
Hampered by an industry-wide strike, RKO released only 34 films in 1945, but managed another profitable year. Two more independents agreed to distribution deals with the studio: Rainbow Productions and Liberty Films (Frank Capra's film company). The studio signed numerous stars during the year, such as John Wayne, Cary Grant, Bing Crosby, Ingrid Bergman, Rosalind Russell and Paul Henreid, and the year also marked the return of Ginger Rogers to the studio. Some of RKO's cinematic highlights of 1945 included Along Came Jones, The Enchanted Cottage, Johnny Angel, and The Spanish Main. Two notable films RKO released during 1945 were produced by outside companies: Walt Disney's The Three Caballeros and a film from Leo McCarey's Rainbow Productions named The Bells of St. Mary's; the latter film of the two would become the biggest grossing film in RKO's history.

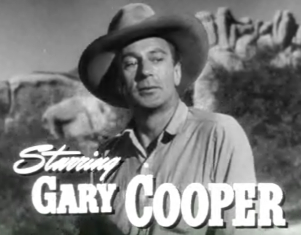
Gary Cooper's title card from Along Came Jones

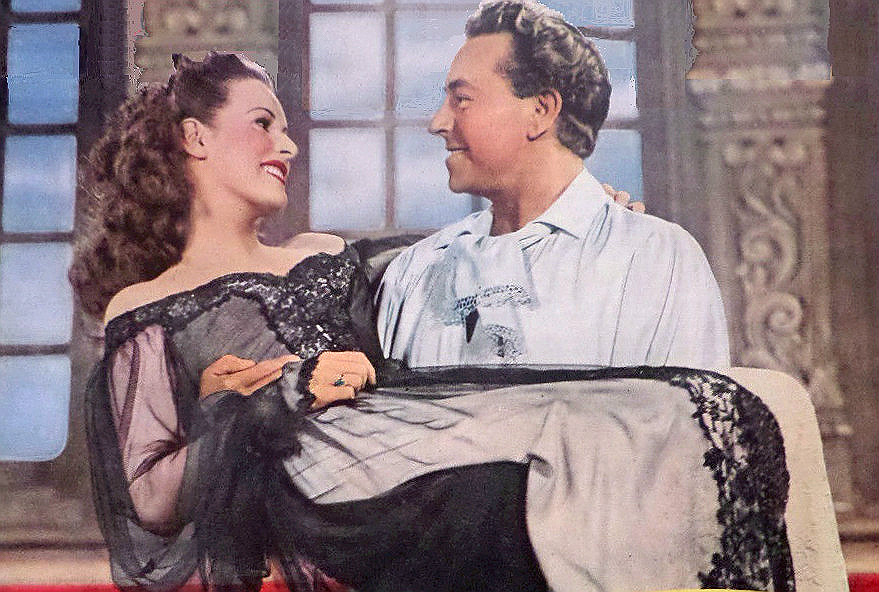
Maureen O'Hara and Paul Henreid in The Spanish Main

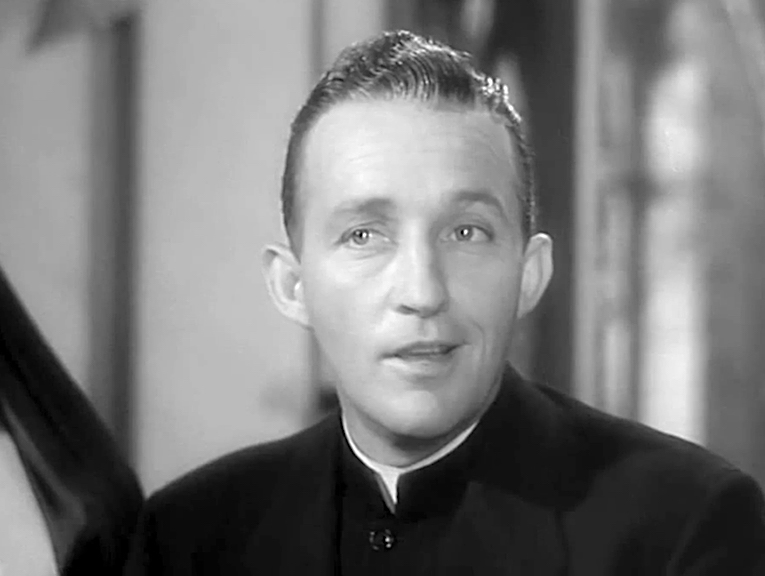
Bing Crosby in The Bells of St. Mary's

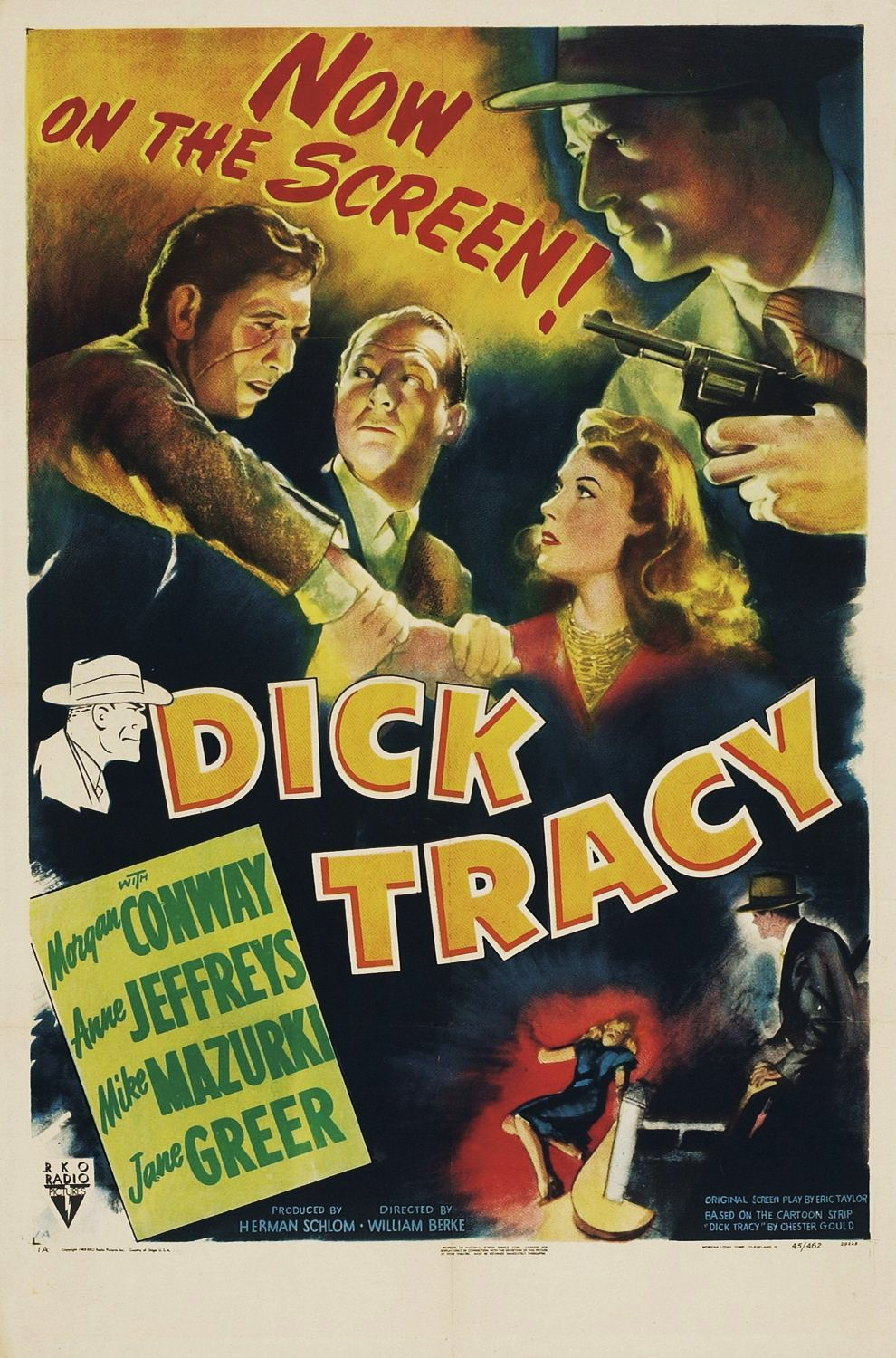
Poster for Dick Tracy

Release date	Film	Notes
January 27, 1945	What a Blonde	
February 22, 1945	The Three Caballeros	World premiere in Mexico City on December 21, 1944; distribution only; produced by Walt Disney Productions
March 3, 1945	It's a Pleasure	
March 22, 1945	Pan-Americana	
April 12, 1945	Having Wonderful Crime	
April 13, 1945	Two O'Clock Courage	
April 24, 1945	Betrayal from the East	
April 26, 1945	Zombies on Broadway	
April 28, 1945	The Enchanted Cottage	
April 29, 1945	Tarzan and the Amazons	
May 10, 1945	The Brighton Strangler	
May 24, 1945	China Sky	
May 25, 1945	The Body Snatcher	
June 8, 1945*	Wonder Man	Distribution only; produced by Samuel Goldwyn Productions
June 19, 1945	Those Endearing Young Charms	
June 20, 1945	Along Came Jones	Distribution only; produced by International Pictures
June 25, 1945	Back to Bataan	
July 25, 1945	The Falcon in San Francisco	
August 1, 1945	Radio Stars on Parade	
August 8, 1945*	Mama Loves Papa	
August 11, 1945	West of the Pecos	
September 7, 1945	Isle of the Dead	
September 11, 1945	First Yank into Tokyo	
September 28, 1945	Wanderer of the Wasteland	
October 4, 1945	The Spanish Main	
October 10, 1945	George White's Scandals	
October 25, 1945	Johnny Angel	
November 14, 1945*	Sing Your Way Home	
November 16, 1945	Man Alive	
November 23, 1945	A Game of Death	
December 6, 1945	The Bells of St. Mary's	Theatrical distribution only
December 20, 1945	Dick Tracy	
December 22, 1945	Hotel Reserve	World premiere in London on June 1, 1944
December 25, 1945	Cornered	

=== 1946 ===
Perhaps the best overall year for the studio, it would rake in over $12M in profits, and release 38 films, some of which received high critical acclaim. Unfortunately for RKO, studio head Charles Koerner, the man responsible for this success, died of leukemia early in the year. Highlights of the year included The Spiral Staircase, The Kid from Brooklyn, Till the End of Time, Notorious, The Best Years of Our Lives, It's a Wonderful Life and Nocturne. During the year, RKO also released a film that would haunt its producer's studio in years to come: Walt Disney's Song of the South.

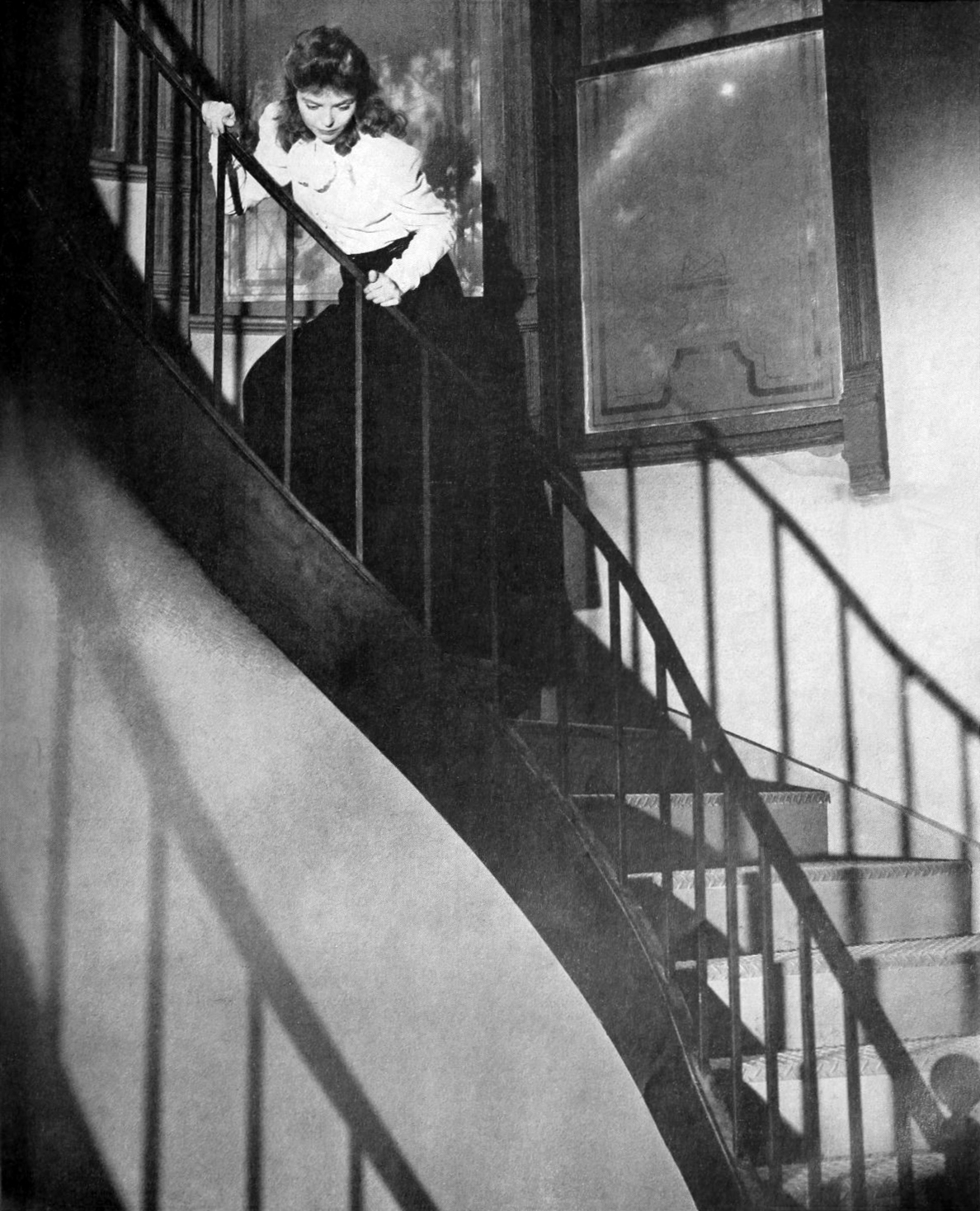
Dorothy McGuire in The Spiral Staircase

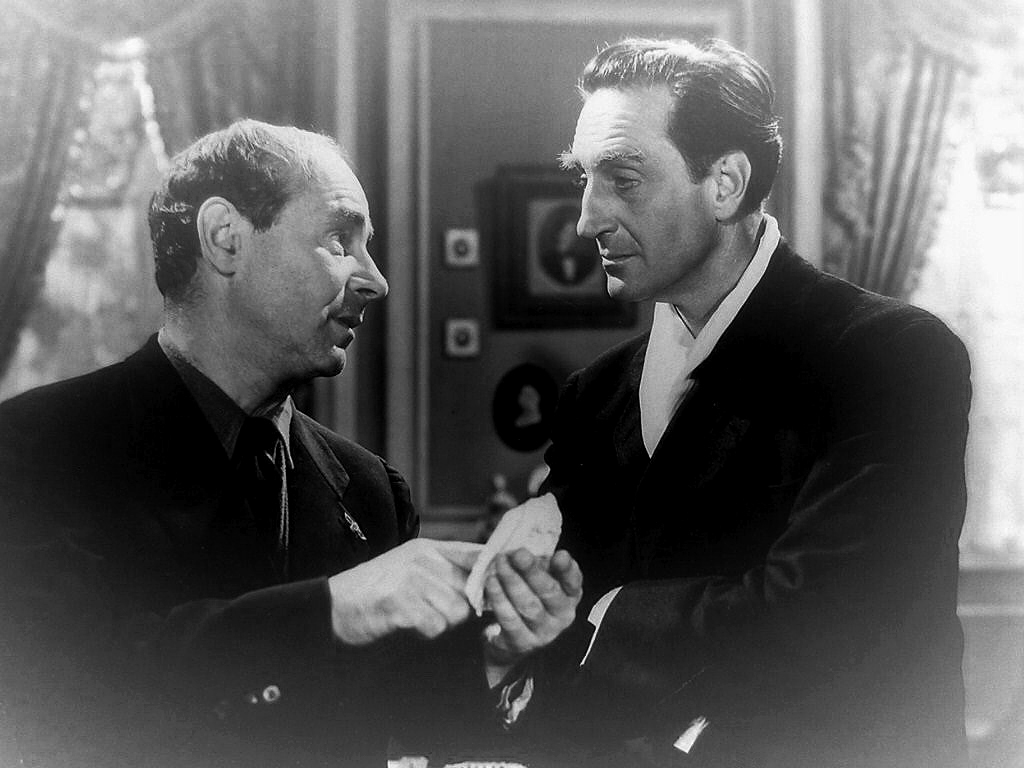
Mikhail Rasumny and Basil Rathbone in Heartbeat

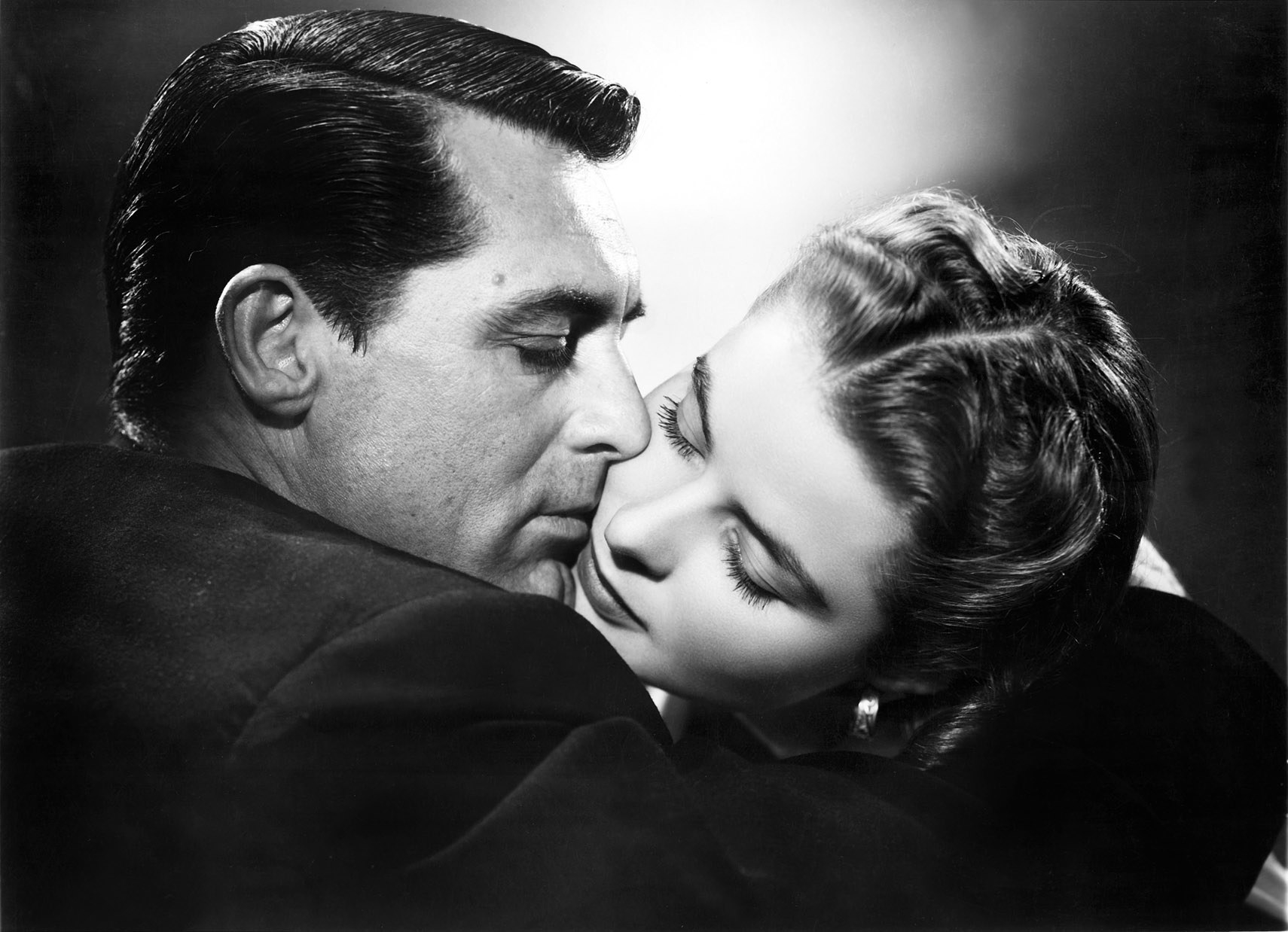
Cary Grant and Ingrid Bergman in Notorious

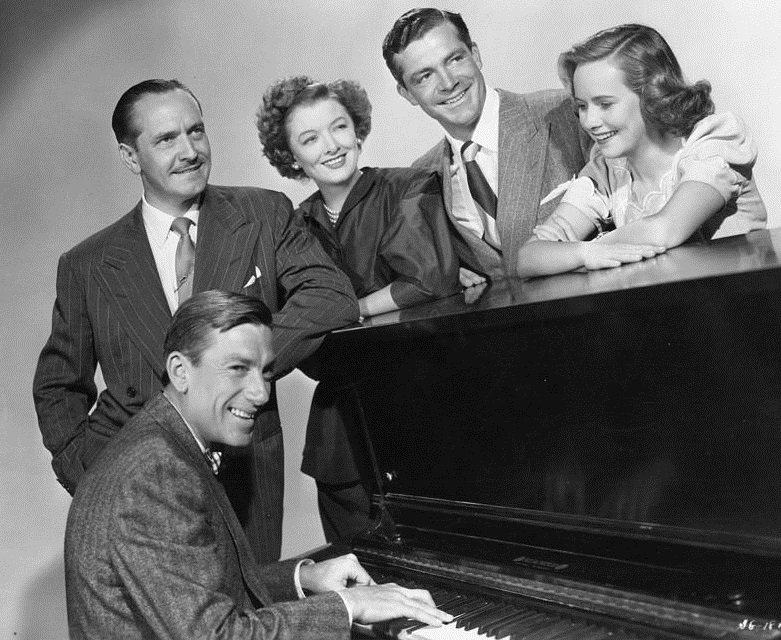
Hoagy Carmichael, Fredric March, Myrna Loy, Dana Andrews and Teresa Wright in The Best Years of Our Lives

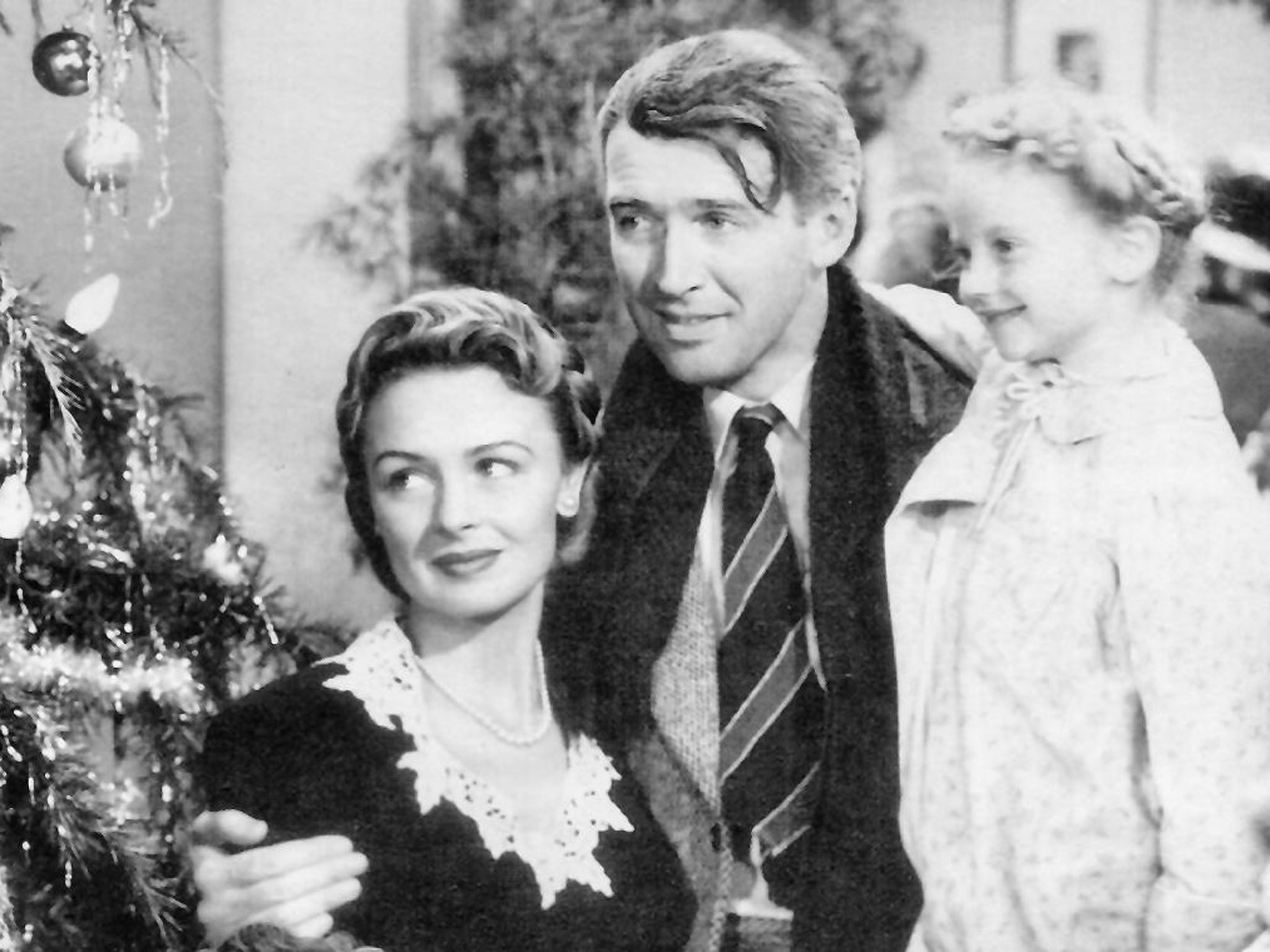
Donna Reed, James Stewart, and Karolyn Grimes in It's a Wonderful Life

Release date	Film	Notes
February 7, 1946	The Spiral Staircase	
February 13, 1946	Riverboat Rhythm	
February 18, 1946	Tarzan and the Leopard Woman	
February 20, 1946	Tomorrow Is Forever	World premiere in London on January 18, 1946; distribution only; produced by International Pictures
March 21, 1946	The Kid from Brooklyn	Theatrical distribution only; produced by Samuel Goldwyn Productions [N2] owned by The Samuel Goldwyn Family Trustee
April 3, 1946	Deadline at Dawn	
April 15, 1946	Ding Dong Williams	
April 19, 1946	From This Day Forward	
April 20, 1946	Make Mine Music	Premiered in New York City, wide release on August 15, 1946; distribution only; produced by Walt Disney Productions
April 22, 1946	The Falcon's Alibi	
April 25, 1946	Partners in Time	
April 22, 1946	Badman's Territory	
May 10, 1946	Bedlam	
May 10, 1946	Heartbeat	
May 13, 1946	Without Reservations	
July 2, 1946	The Stranger (Note: Owned by MGM (via United Artists), but currently in the public domain in the United States)	
July 15, 1946	The Bamboo Blonde	
July 23, 1946	Till the End of Time	
July 26, 1946	The Truth About Murder	
August 15, 1946	Notorious	Premiered in New York City, wide release on September 6, 1946
August 30, 1946	Step by Step	
September 6, 1946	Crack-Up	
September 29, 1946	Sister Kenny	Premiered in New York City, wide release on October 10, 1946
October 1, 1946	Sunset Pass	
October 15, 1946	Child of Divorce	
October 18, 1946	Lady Luck	
October 20, 1946	Genius at Work	
October 29, 1946	Nocturne	
October 30, 1946	Great Day	World premiere in London on April 13, 1945
November 12, 1946	Song of the South	Premiered in Atlanta, GA, wide release on November 20, 1946; Distribution only; produced by Walt Disney Productions
November 15, 1946	Criminal Court	Premiered in New York City, wide release on November 20, 1946
November 21, 1946	The Best Years of Our Lives	Distribution only; produced by Samuel Goldwyn Productions
November 22, 1946	Dick Tracy vs. Cueball	Premiered in New York City, wide release on December 18, 1946
December 5, 1946	San Quentin	Premiered in Boston, wide release on December 17, 1946
December 10, 1946	Vacation in Reno	
December 13, 1946	The Falcon's Adventure	
December 20, 1946	It's a Wonderful Life	Theatrical distribution only; produced by Liberty Films
December 20, 1946	The Locket	

=== 1947 ===
This year saw the beginning of activity by the House Un-American Activities Committee (HUAC) in the film industry. Two of the infamous "Hollywood Ten" were the only director and producer among that group (Edward Dmytryk and Adrian Scott, respectively), and were also two of RKO's top talent. In addition, production costs were rising at the same time that revenues, both domestically and overseas, were declining. Despite those challenges, the studio saw another profitable year, releasing 35 films. Some of more notable films released during 1947 included Trail Street, The Farmer's Daughter, The Bachelor and the Bobby-Soxer, Crossfire (the last picture of Scott and Dmytryk before their blacklist), Out of the Past, and the Samuel Goldwyn efforts The Bishop's Wife, and The Secret Life of Walter Mitty. Two of the largest disappointments (artistically and financially) were Mourning Becomes Electra and Tycoon.

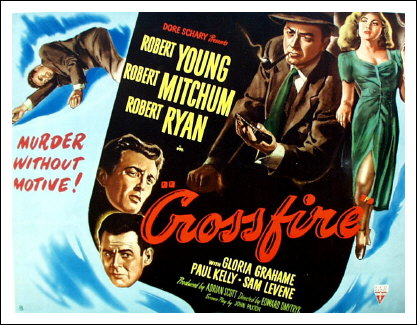
Poster for Crossfire

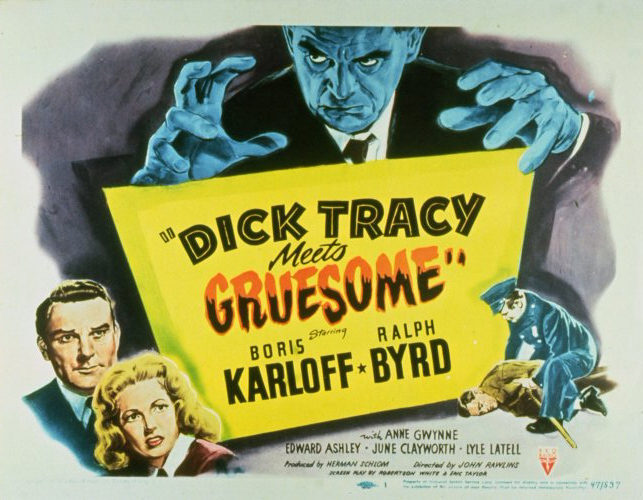
Lobby card for Dick Tracy Meets Gruesome

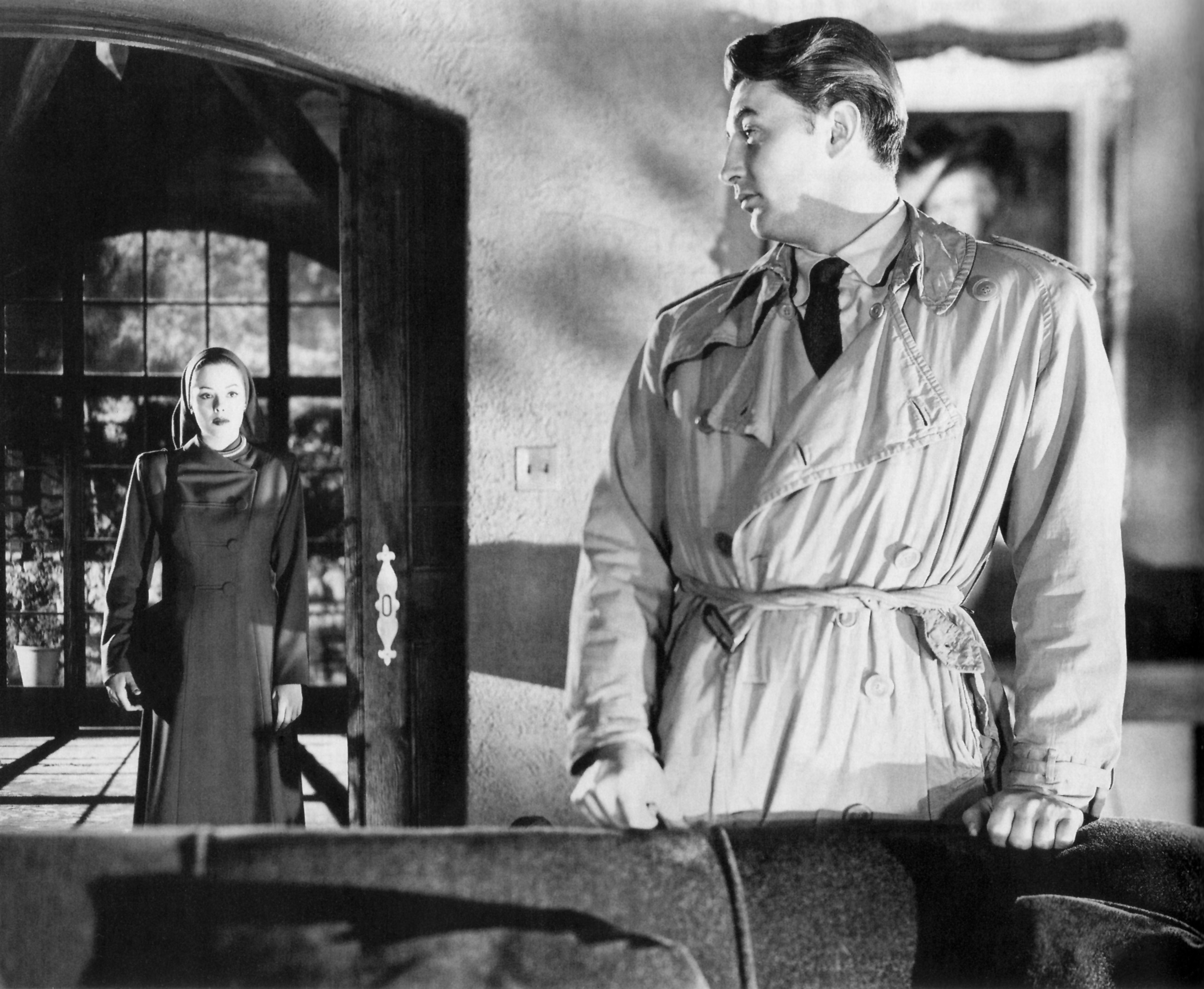
Jane Greer and Robert Mitchum in Out of the Past

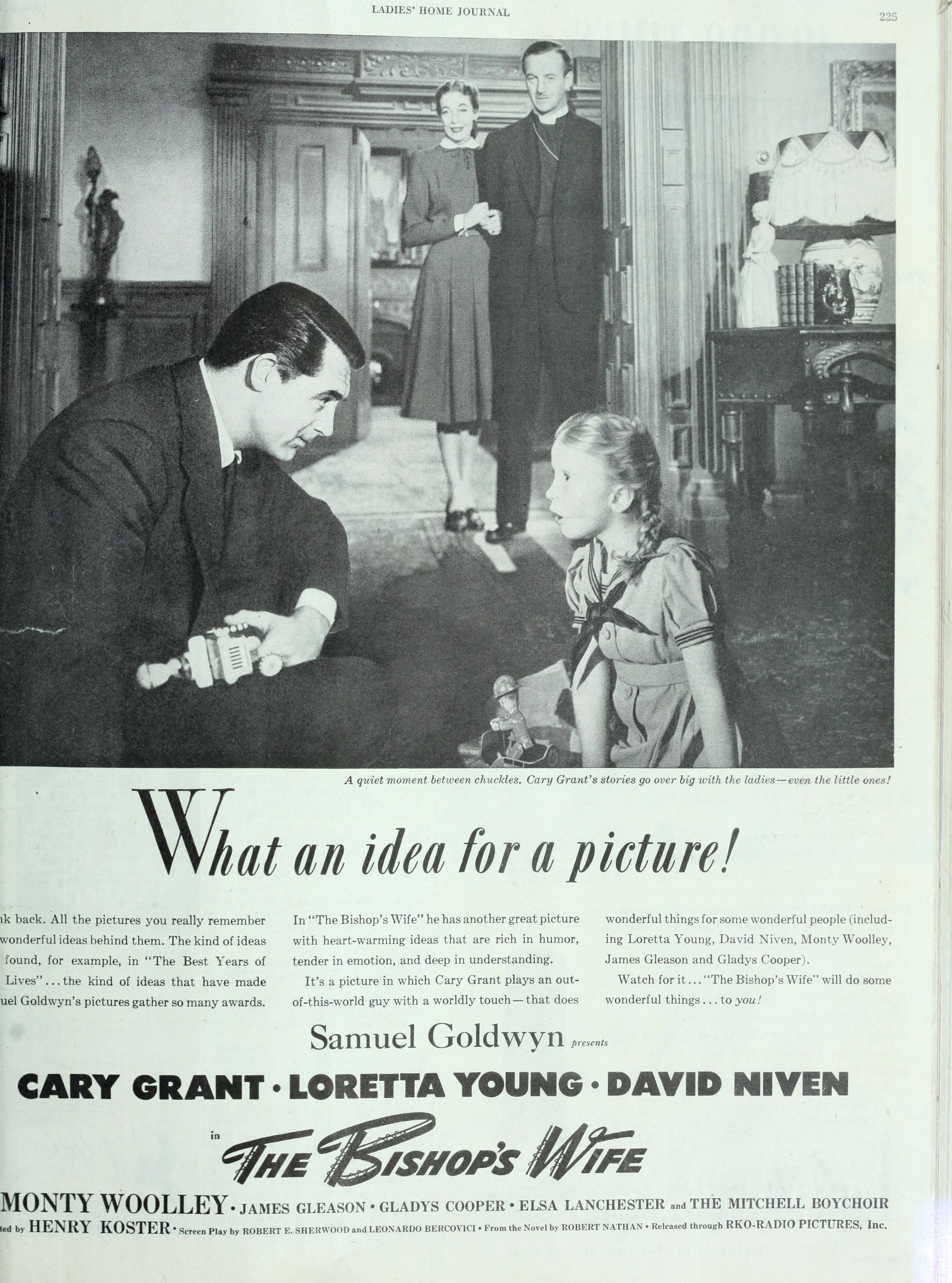
Cary Grant, Loretta Young, and David Niven, and Karolyn Grimes in The Bishop's Wife

Release date	Film	Notes
January 13, 1947	Sinbad the Sailor	
February 19, 1947	Beat the Band	
February 19, 1947	Trail Street	
February 20, 1947	The Devil Thumbs a Ride	
February 20, 1947	Code of the West	
April 5, 1947	Tarzan and the Huntress	
April 16, 1947	A Likely Story	
May 3, 1947	Born to Kill	
May 14, 1947	Thunder Mountain	
May 15, 1947	Banjo	
May 17, 1947	Desperate	
May 17, 1947	Honeymoon	
May 25, 1947	The Farmer's Daughter	Premiered in New York City, wide release on May 26, 1947
June 7, 1947	The Woman on the Beach	
June 28, 1947	Riff-Raff	Premiered in New York City, wide release on September 15, 1947
July 12, 1947	Dick Tracy's Dilemma	
July 16, 1947*	They Won't Believe Me	
July 22, 1947	Crossfire	Premiered in New York City, wide release on August 15, 1947
July 24, 1947	The Bachelor and the Bobby-Soxer	Premiered in New York City, wide release on September 1, 1947
July 30, 1947	Seven Keys to Baldpate	Premiered in Los Angeles, wide release on October 1, 1947
August 1, 1947	Under the Tonto Rim	
August 4, 1947	The Secret Life of Walter Mitty	Distribution only; produced by Samuel Goldwyn Productions;premiered in Chicago, wide release on September 1, 1947
August 6, 1947	The Long Night	
September 26, 1947	Dick Tracy Meets Gruesome	
September 27, 1947	Fun and Fancy Free	Distribution only; produced by Walt Disney Productions
October 7, 1947	Magic Town	Premiered in New York City, wide release on October 12, 1947
October 21, 1947	Man About Town	World premiere in Paris, May 21, 1947
November 4, 1947	So Well Remembered	Premiered in London on July 8, 1947
November 3, 1947	The Fugitive	
November 13, 1947	Wild Horse Mesa	
November 13, 1947	Out of the Past	
November 19, 1947	Mourning Becomes Electra	
December 9, 1947	The Bishop's Wife	Premiered in New York City, wide release on February 16, 1948; distribution only; produced by Samuel Goldwyn Productions
December 27, 1947	Tycoon	

=== 1948 ===
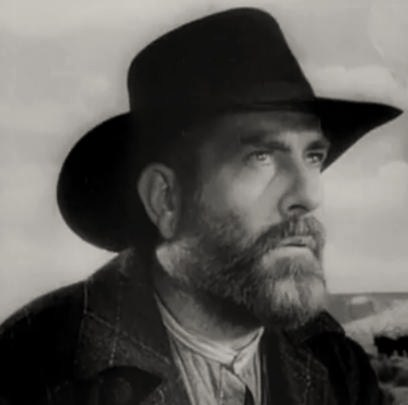
Grant Withers in Fort Apache

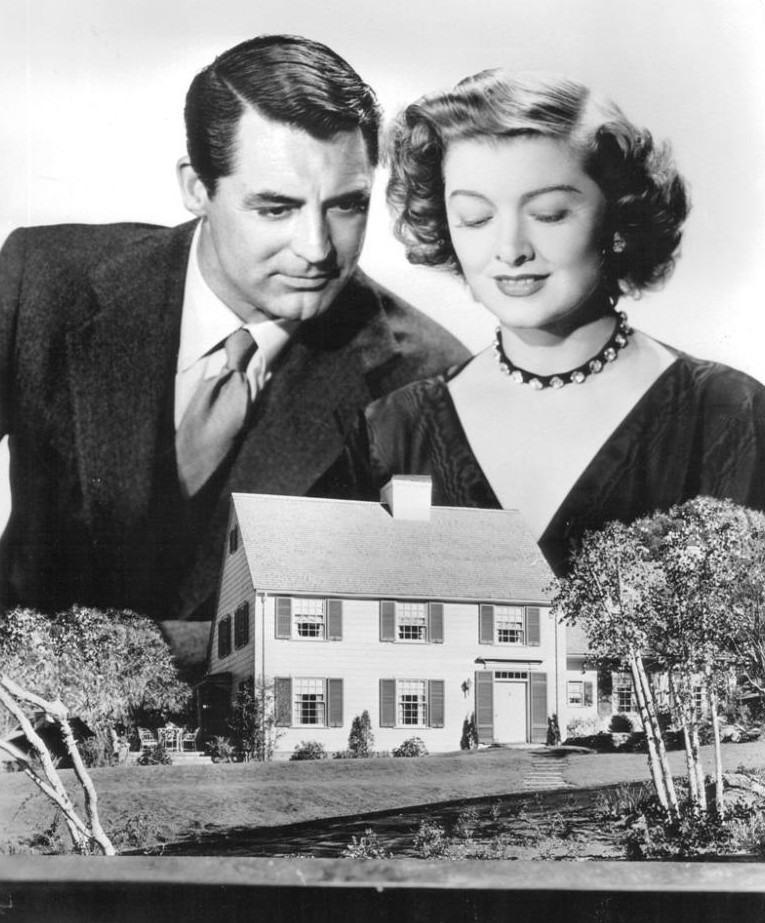
Cary Grant and Myrna Loy in a promotional shot for Mr. Blandings Builds His Dream House

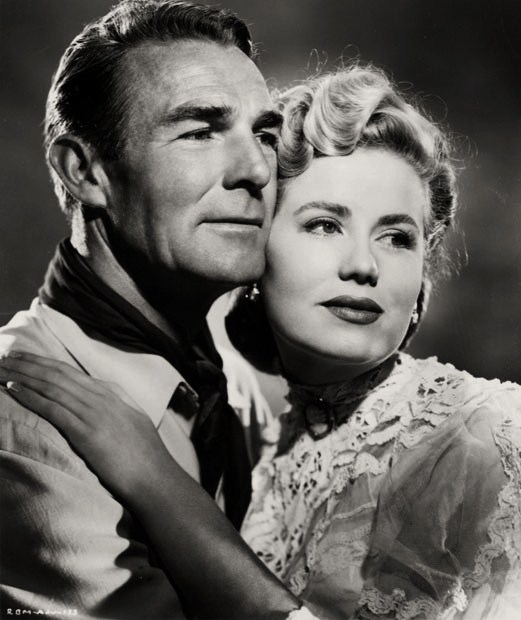
Randolph Scott and Jacqueline White in Return of the Bad Men

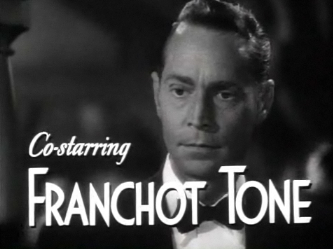
Franchot Tone's title card from Every Girl Should Be Married

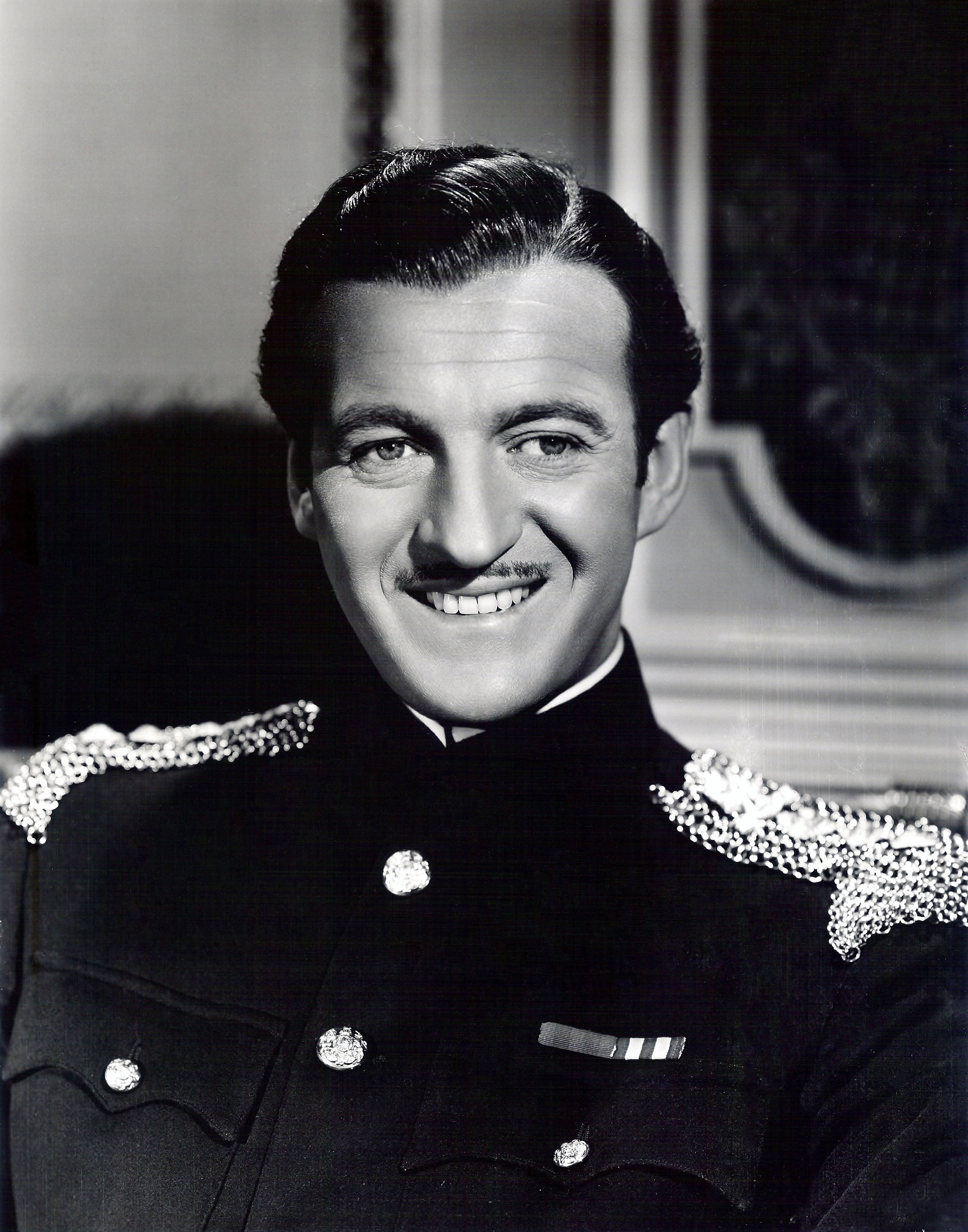
David Niven publicity photo from Enchantment

1948 marked the beginning of the slow end of the studio when Howard Hughes purchased enough stock to gain control of RKO. This precipitated another shake-up in the creative control at the production company, which in turn led to seventy-five percent of the studio's workforce being terminated in July, and production coming to a virtual standstill. RKO managed to release 32 films during the year, but most were either through distribution deals, or had been finished prior to Hughes' takeover. Despite the light release schedule, the studio did have a few highlights, which included Fort Apache, Mr. Blandings Builds His Dream House, Rachel and the Stranger, A Song Is Born, and Every Girl Should Be Married. In addition, I Remember Mama and The Pearl were critical, if not financial, successes. The biggest disappointment was Joan of Arc.

Release date	Film	Notes
January 20, 1948	Night Song	
January 24, 1948	Western Heritage	
February 7, 1948	If You Knew Susie	
February 17, 1948	The Pearl	Spanish version premiered in Mexico City on September 12, 1947, English version premiered in New York City
March 11, 1948	I Remember Mama	Premiered in New York City, wide release on March 17, 1948
March 16, 1948	The Miracle of the Bells	Distribution only; produced by Jesse L. Lasky Productions: Premiered in New York City, wide release on March 27, 1948
March 27, 1948	Fort Apache	
April 14, 1948	Design for Death	Academy Award Winner for Best Documentary of 1947
April 27, 1948	Tarzan and the Mermaids	Premiered in Los Angeles, wide release on May 15, 1948
May 7, 1948	Berlin Express	
May 15, 1948	The Arizona Ranger	
May 27, 1948	Melody Time	Distribution only; produced by Walt Disney Productions
June 4, 1948	Mr. Blandings Builds His Dream House	
June 19, 1948	Fighting Father Dunne	
June 18, 1948	Guns of Hate	
June 22, 1948	Race Street	
July 1, 1948	Mystery in Mexico	
July 17, 1948	Return of the Bad Men	
August 21, 1948	Variety Time	
August 25, 1948	The Velvet Touch	
September 1, 1948	Good Sam	
September 4, 1948	Bodyguard	
September 18, 1948	Rachel and the Stranger	Premiered in New York City, wide release on October 2, 1948
October 19, 1948	Station West	
October 19, 1948	A Song is Born	Distribution only; produced by Samuel Goldwyn Productions; premiered in New York City, wide release on November 6, 1948
November 9, 1948	Blood on the Moon	
November 9, 1948	Every Girl Should Be Married	
November 11, 1948	Joan of Arc	
December 2, 1948	The Green Promise	Premiered in Chicago, wide release on March 22, 1949
December 11, 1948	Indian Agent	
December 11, 1948	Enchantment	Distribution only; produced by Samuel Goldwyn Productions
December 27, 1948	The Boy With Green Hair	
December 28, 1948	Gun Smugglers	

=== 1949 ===
This was not a banner year for the studio, as Hughes continued to interfere with the creative people underneath him. RKO only began production on 12 films during the year, although they would release 34. The few highlights of 1949 included The Set-Up, The Big Steal, Mighty Joe Young, and She Wore a Yellow Ribbon. They Live by Night was a critical success, but it did poorly at box office.

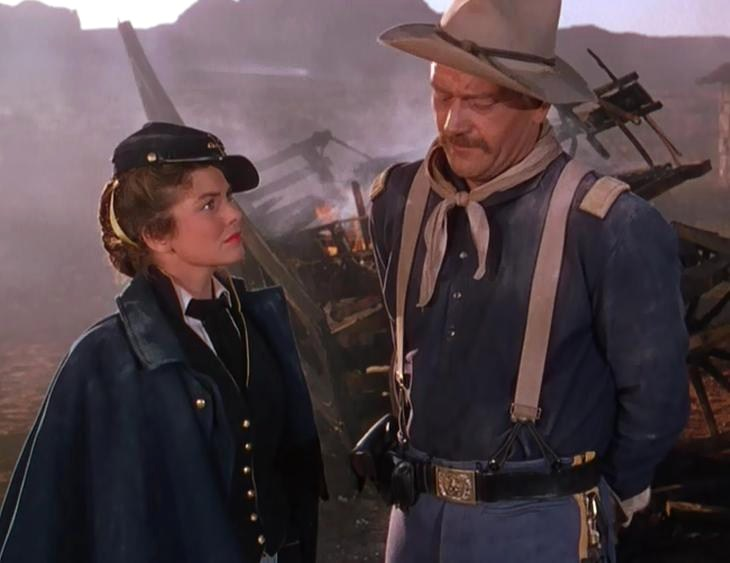
John Wayne and Joanne Dru in She Wore a Yellow Ribbon

Release date	Film	Notes
January 19, 1949	So Dear to My Heart	Premiered in Indianapolis, wide release on January 30, 1949; distribution only; produced by Walt Disney Productions
February 5, 1949	Tarzan's Magic Fountain	
February 7, 1949	A Woman's Secret	
February 8, 1949	Brothers in the Saddle	
February 11, 1949	Riders of the Range	
February 14, 1949	The Clay Pigeon	
March 29, 1949	The Set-Up	Premiered in New York City, wide release on April 2, 1949
April 19, 1949	Adventure in Baltimore	
May 4, 1949	Arctic Fury	Premiered in New York City, wide release on April 2, 1949
May 14, 1949	Rustlers	
May 17, 1949	The Window	Premiered in Los Angeles, wide release on October 1, 1949
June 11, 1949	The Judge Steps Out	
June 16, 1949	Roughshod	
June 27, 1949	Stagecoach Kid	
July 1, 1949	The Big Steal	
July 7, 1949	Follow Me Quietly	
July 26, 1949	She Wore a Yellow Ribbon	Premiered in Kansas City, KS, wide release on October 22, 1949
July 27, 1949	Mighty Joe Young	Premiered in New York City, wide release on July 30, 1949
August 11, 1949	Make Mine Laughs	
August 18, 1949	Roseanna McCoy	Premiered in Wheeling, WV, wide release on August 20, 1949; distribution only; produced by Samuel Goldwyn Productions
September 10, 1949	The Mysterious Desperado	
September 17, 1949	Savage Splendor	
September 29, 1949	Strange Bargain	Premiered in New York, wide release on November 5, 1949
October 5, 1949	The Adventures of Ichabod and Mr. Toad	Distribution only; produced by Walt Disney Productions
October 7, 1949	The Woman on Pier 13	Previewed in Los Angeles, wide release on June 3, 1950
October 8, 1949	Easy Living	
October 15, 1949	Masked Raiders	
November 3, 1949	They Live by Night	Premiered in London in August 1948
November 12, 1949	Bride for Sale	Distribution only; produced by Crest Productions
November 23, 1949	Holiday Affair	Premiered in New York, wide release on December 24, 1949
November 26, 1949	The Threat	
November 26, 1949	A Dangerous Profession	
December 25, 1949	My Foolish Heart	Distribution only; produced by Samuel Goldwyn Productions; premiered in Los Angeles, wide release on January 21, 1950

== 1950s ==
The decade would be the last for the original RKO Studio. The downward spiral which had begun upon Hughes' gaining control in 1948 continued. In addition, the studio suffered from a sequence of other difficulties, from which it was unable to overcome. These included a failed sale of the studio to several racketeers, the loss of RKO's chain of movie theaters (due to government regulation), and a multitude of lawsuits. The setbacks ultimately led, in 1955, to the studio's sale to General Teleradio, Inc., the entertainment subsidiary of General Tire and Rubber Company. Ironically, General Teleradio was basically a radio and television company, and it was competition with television which put the final nails in RKO's coffin. RKO ended production in 1958.

=== 1950 ===
Of the 30 films released by the studio during the year, approximately half were actually produced by the studio. In addition, not a single picture would generate profits greater than $100,000, the first time this happened in the history of RKO, and this resulted in the first net loss for the studio ($5.8M) in over a decade. Hope was raised when Hughes hired what many considered the top producer-writer team in Hollywood, Jerry Wald and Norman Krasna, who were contracted to produce 60 films over the next five years. The few highlights were all films which were not produced by RKO: The Outlaw (Jane Russell's debut — and a re-release of the film which had seen limited release as an independent Hughes' production in 1943 and 1946, so is not included in the below list), along with Walt Disney's productions of Cinderella and Treasure Island, the first project he made which was entirely live-action.

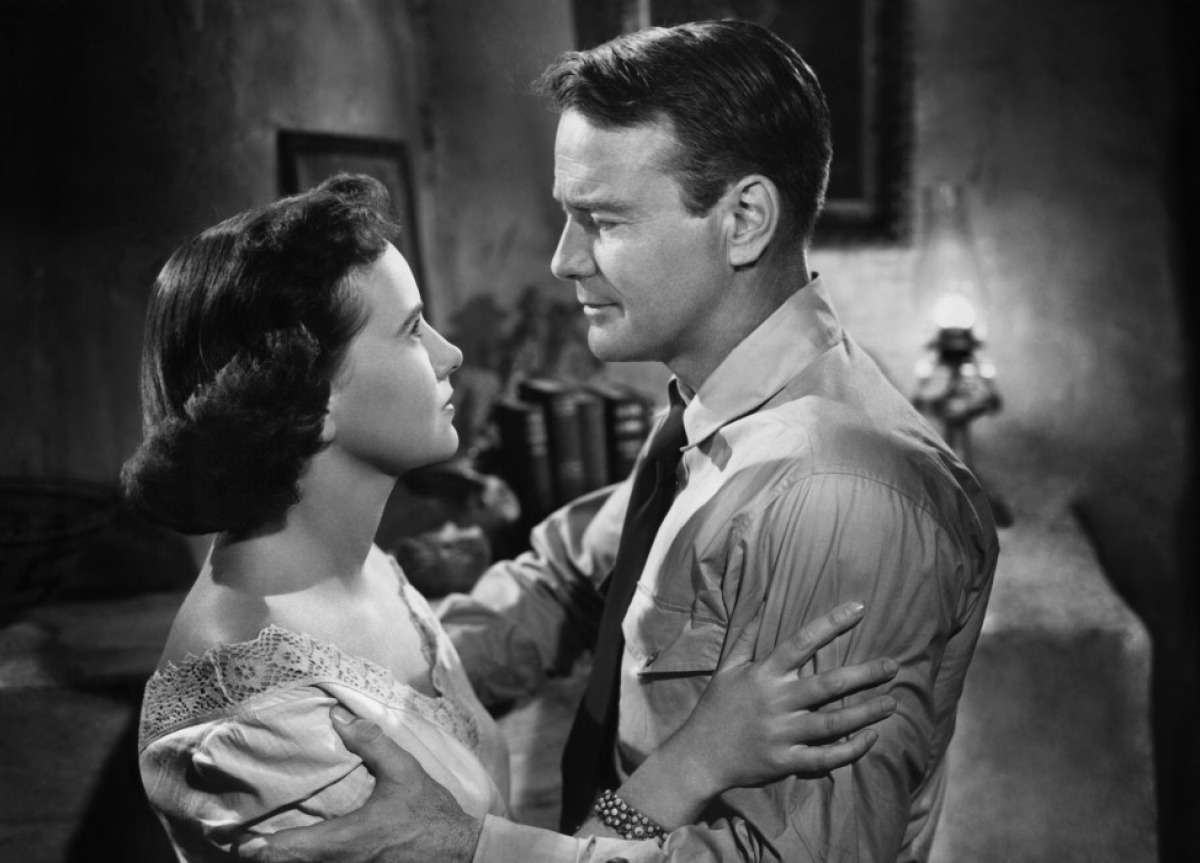
Teresa Wright and Lew Ayres in The Capture

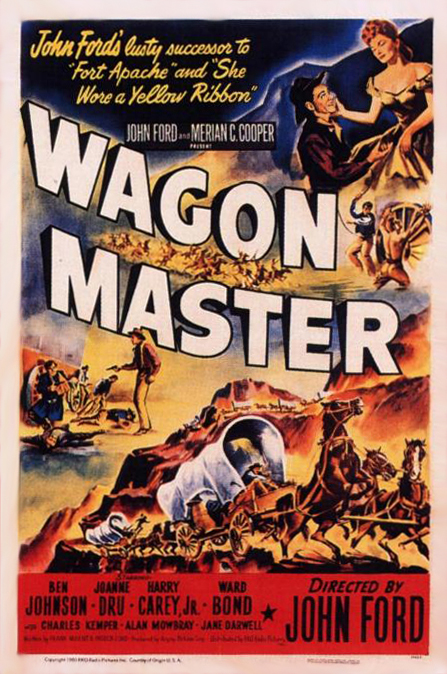
Poster for Wagon Master

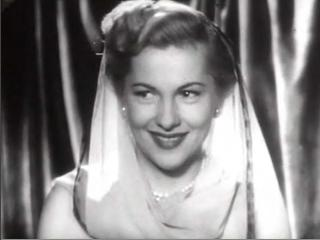
Joan Fontaine in Born to Be Bad

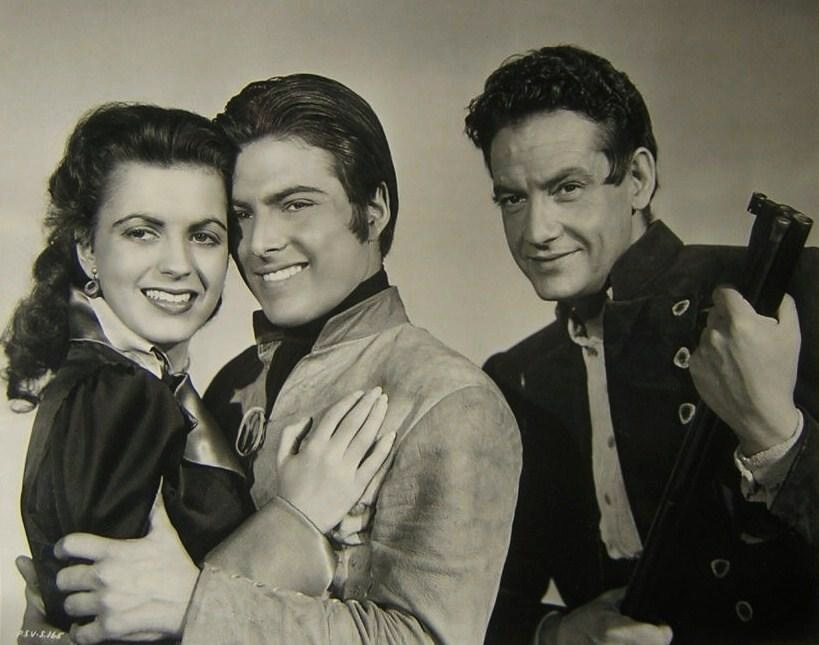
Faith Domergue, Donald Buka, and George Dolenz in a publicity still for Vendetta

Release date	Film	Notes
January 28, 1950	The Man on the Eiffel Tower	World premiere in Montreal, Quebec on January 19, 1950, premiered in New York City in the US, with wide release on February 4, 1950
February 9, 1950	The Tattooed Stranger	
February 15, 1950	Stromboli	Premiered in New York City, wide release on February 18, 1950
February 21, 1950	The Secret Fury	
March 4, 1950	Cinderella	Distribution only; produced by Walt Disney Productions
April 8, 1950	The Capture	
April 8, 1950	The Golden Twenties	
April 22, 1950	Wagon Master	
April 22, 1950	Storm Over Wyoming	
June 6, 1950	Destination Murder	
June 7, 1950	Rider from Tucson	
June 8, 1950	Armored Car Robbery	
June 15, 1950	Dynamite Pass	
June 23, 1950	Tarzan and the Slave Girl	
June 24, 1950	The White Tower	
July 19, 1950	Treasure Island	World premiere in London on June 22, 1950; distribution only; produced by Walt Disney Productions
July 27, 1950	Our Very Own	Distribution only; produced by Samuel Goldwyn Productions
August 3, 1950	Edge of Doom	Distribution only; produced by Samuel Goldwyn Productions
August 5, 1950*	Border Treasure	
August 31, 1950	Born to Be Bad	
September 1, 1950	Bunco Squad	
September 27, 1950	Outrage	Distribution only; produced by The Filmakers
October 14, 1950	Walk Softly, Stranger	Premiered in New York City, wide release on November 4, 1950
October 21, 1950*	Rio Grande Patrol	
November 16, 1950	Where Danger Lives	
November 21, 1950	Experiment Alcatraz	
November 21, 1950	Never a Dull Moment	Premiered in New York City, wide release on November 22, 1950
December 1, 1950	Double Deal	
December 25, 1950	Vendetta	
December 26, 1950	Hunt the Man Down	
December 27, 1950	Law of the Badlands	

=== 1951 ===
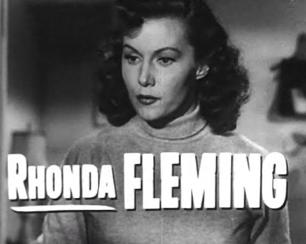
Rhonda Fleming title card from Cry Danger

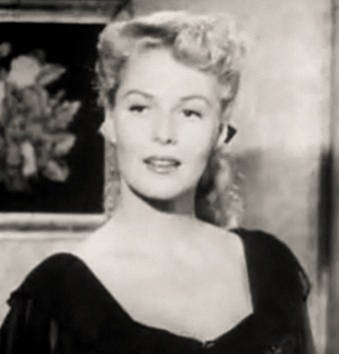
Janis Carter in My Forbidden Past

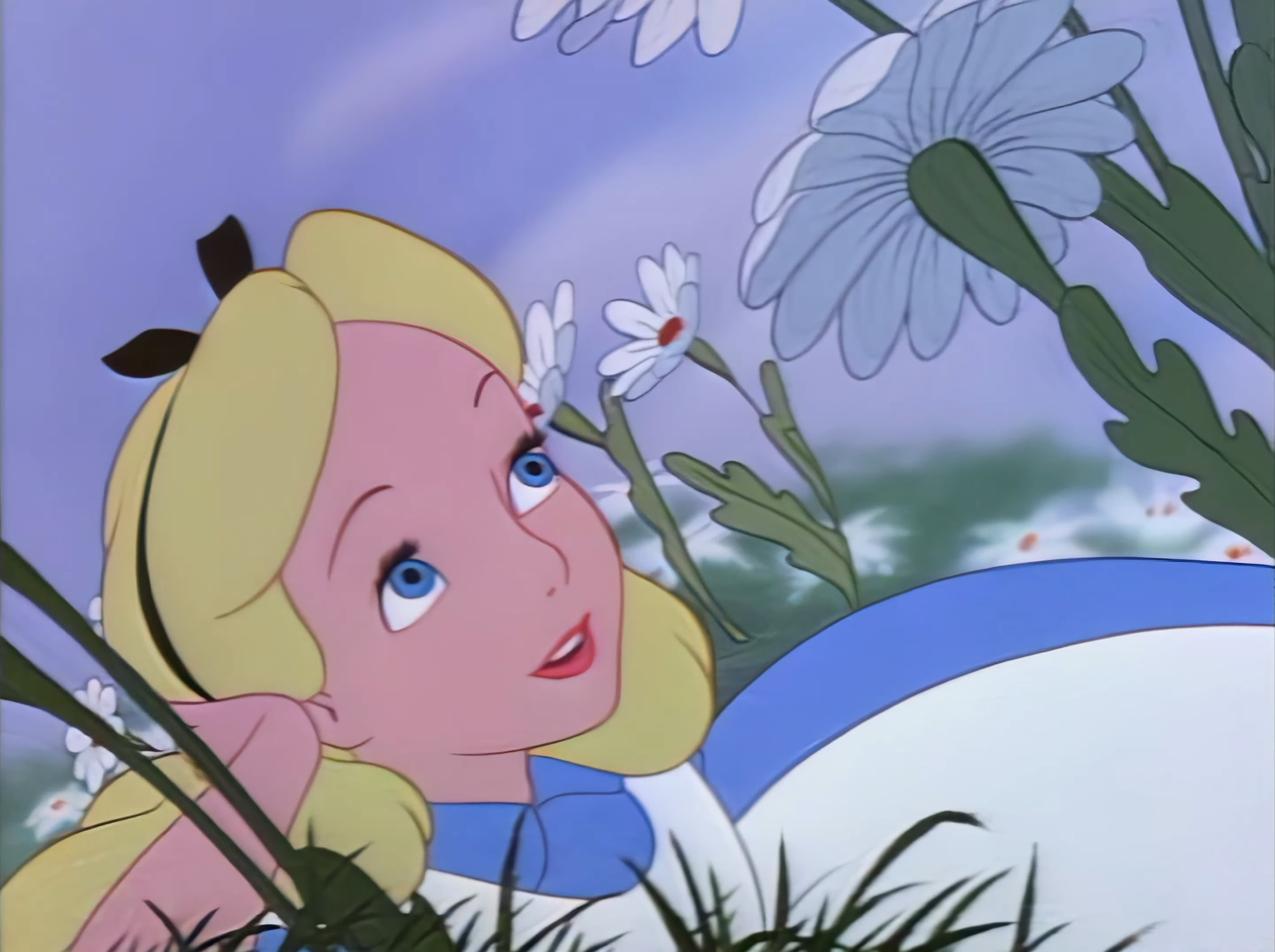
Alice from the 1951 Walt Disney animated film Alice in Wonderland.

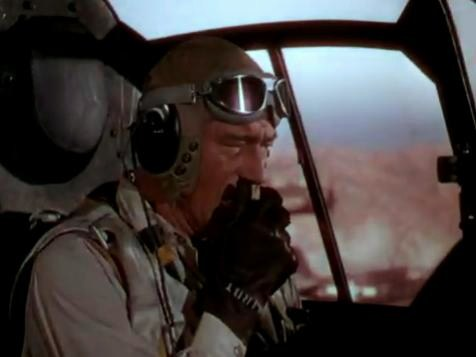
John Wayne in Flying Leathernecks

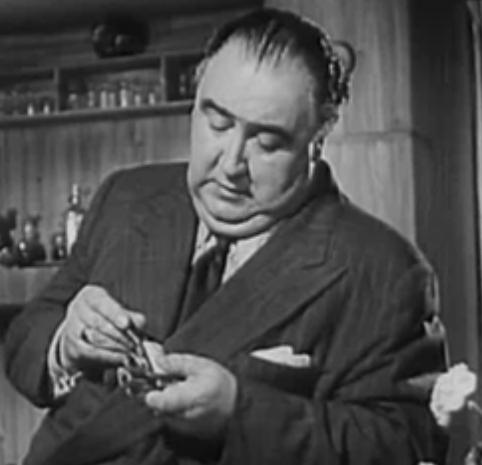
Francis L. Sullivan in Behave Yourself!

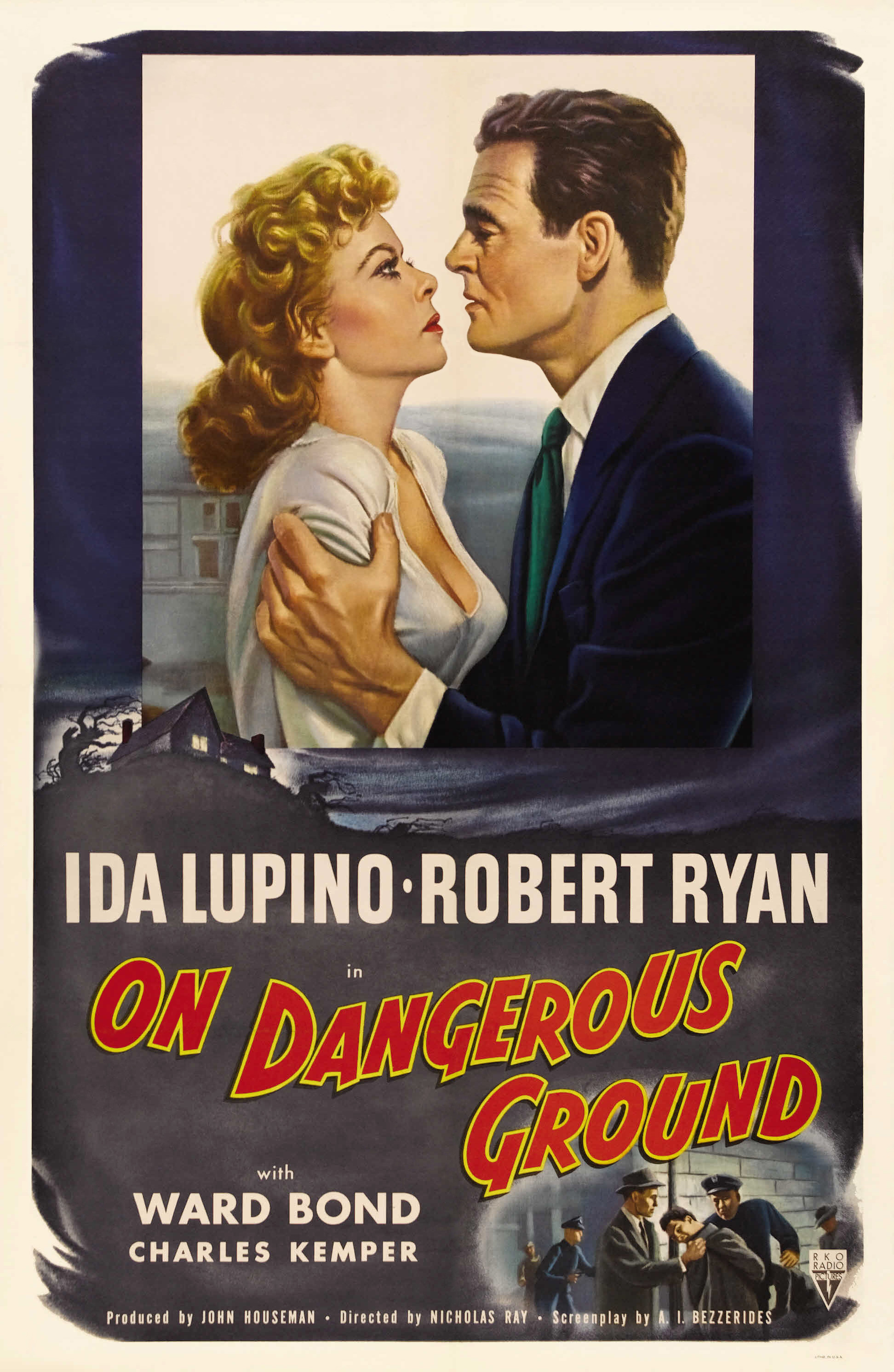
Poster for On Dangerous Ground

The studio's slow slide to oblivion continued in 1951, exacerbated by the government requirement that they split off their theater operations from their film operations. The RKO Story, by Richard Jewell with Vernon Harbin, states that RKO had "... become the combination laughing stock and pariah of the entire industry." Barely showing a profit, the studio released 39 films, the highlights being: Payment on Demand, The Racket, The Thing from Another World (aka The Thing), Flying Leathernecks, and The Blue Veil. The biggest financial and critical disappointment RKO had during the year was a film from Walt Disney that would ironically be hailed as an animated classic: Alice in Wonderland.

Release date	Film	Notes
January 6, 1951	The Company She Keeps	
January 20, 1951	Gambling House	
February 3, 1951	Payment on Demand	
February 22, 1951	Nor Orchids for Miss Blandish	
February 22, 1951	Cry Danger	Distribution only; co-production with Olympic Productions Inc. & Wiesenthal-Frank Productions
March 13, 1951	Tarzan's Peril	
March 21, 1951	Footlight Varieties	
April 3, 1951	Kon-Tiki	Received Academy Award nomination for Best Documentary Feature
April 20, 1951	Saddle Legion	
April 21, 1951	My Forbidden Past	
April 24, 1951	Gunplay	
April 29, 1951	The Thing from Another World	aka. The Thing; co-produced with Winchester Pictures Corporation
May 4, 1951	Jungle Headhunters	
May 5, 1951	Tokyo File 212	
May 19, 1951	Sealed Cargo	
May 23, 1951	Hard, Fast and Beautiful	Premiered in San Francisco, wide release on June 9, 1951
July 23, 1951*	Lilli Marlene	
July 8, 1951	Happy Go Lovely	World premiere in London on June 7, 1951; U.S. distribution only; produced by Excelsior Films
July 27, 1951	Pistol Harvest	
July 28, 1951	Alice in Wonderland	World premiere in London on July 26, 1951; distribution only; produced by Walt Disney Productions
July 30, 1951	Roadblock	
June 9, 1951	Best of the Badmen	
August 15, 1951	His Kind of Woman	Premiered in Philadelphia, wide release on August 25, 1951
August 28, 1951	Flying Leathernecks	
September 5, 1951	The Blue Veil	
September 19, 1951	Behave Yourself!	
September 28, 1951	On the Loose	
October 4, 1951	Tembo	Documentary; premiered in Dallas, wide release on January 4, 1952
October 11, 1951	Slaughter Trail	
October 16, 1951	Drums in the Deep South	
October 24, 1951	The Whip Hand	
October 25, 1951	The Racket	
October 30, 1951	Hot Lead	
November 20, 1951	Two Tickets to Broadway	
December 15, 1951*	Overland Telegraph	
December 17, 1951	On Dangerous Ground	
December 22, 1951	I Want You	Distribution only; produced by Samuel Goldwyn Productions
December 25, 1951	Double Dynamite	
December 25, 1951*	Rashomon (Note: Owned by Kadokawa Pictures, with U.S. distribution rights currently licensed to Janus Films and The Criterion Collection)	Distribution only, produced by Daiei Film; received an Academy Honorary Award for Foreign Film

=== 1952 ===
According to The RKO Story, "... 1952 was the most tempestuous year in the history of an altogether tempestuous enterprise." The studio was plagued by lawsuits, and Howard Hughes would eventually sell his stock in the company. However, the group he sold it to was involved in scandal, and was forced to back out of the deal prior to year's end, leaving the studio virtually without an owner. RKO lost over $10 million on the release of 31 films, half of which were not produced by the studio. In fact, the studio only produced one film in the last five months of the year. 1952 saw few cinematic highlights, and the company's only successes that year came in Rashomon (a Japanese film which had opened in December of the prior year) and Samuel Goldwyn's production of Hans Christian Andersen. The last Goldwyn production to be distributed by RKO Radio Pictures, in fact.

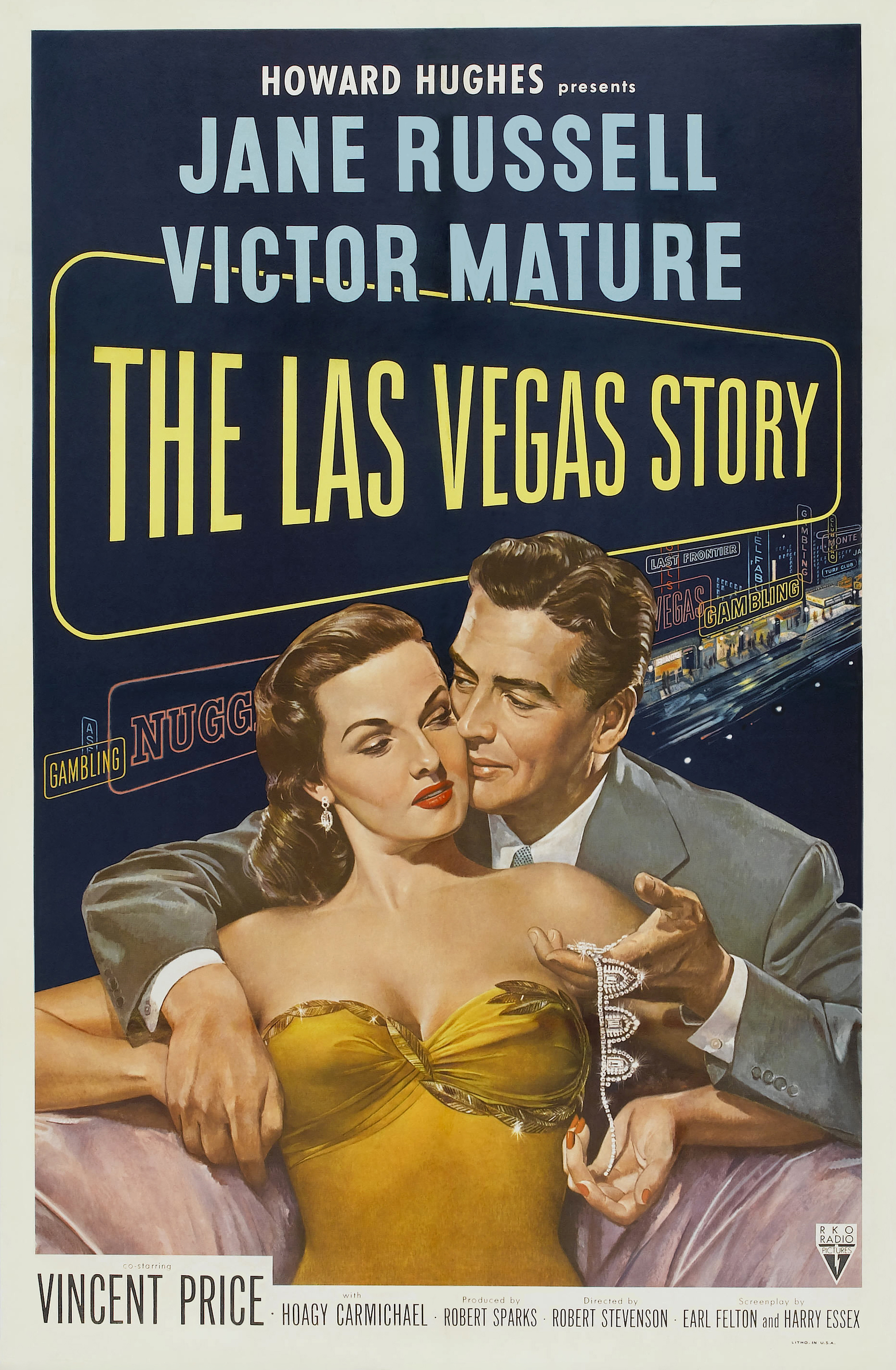
Poster for The Las Vegas Story

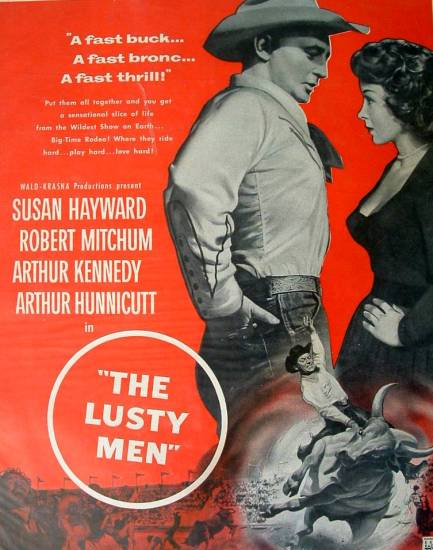
Poster for The Lusty Men

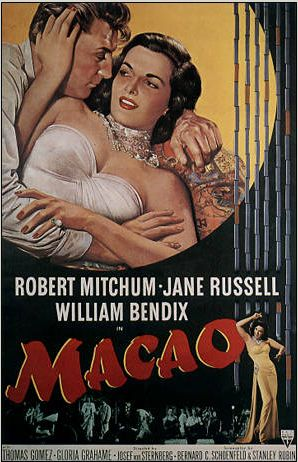
Poster for Macao

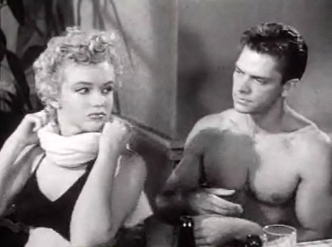
Marilyn Monroe and Keith Andes in Clash by Night

Release date	Film	Notes
January 8, 1952	A Girl in Every Port	
January 30, 1952	The Las Vegas Story	
February 4, 1952	At Sword's Point	
February 13, 1952*	Trail Guide	
February 14, 1952*	Road Agent	
March 6, 1952	Rancho Notorious	
March 14, 1952*	Tarzan's Savage Fury	
March 20, 1952*	Whispering Smith vs. Scotland Yard	Premiered in London on January 31, 1952; aka Whispering Smith Hits London
March 21, 1952	The Pace That Thrills	
April 7, 1952*	The Faithful City	
April 11, 1952*	Target	
April 30, 1952	Macao	
May 2, 1952	The Narrow Margin	
May 4, 1952*	The Half-Breed	
May 13, 1952*	Desert Passage	
May 28, 1952	The Wild Heart	
June 6, 1952	Clash by Night	
June 26, 1952	The Story of Robin Hood and His Merrie Men	World premiere in London on March 22, 1952; distribution only; produced by Walt Disney Productions
July 29, 1952	The Big Sky	Premiered in Chicago, wide release August 19, 1952
July 21, 1952*	One Minute to Zero	
August 7, 1952*	Sudden Fear	Distribution only; co-production with Joseph Kaufman Productions
August 29, 1952	Beware, My Lovely	Distribution only; produced by The Filmakers
October 2, 1952*	Under the Red Sea	
October 10, 1952*	Captive Women	
October 24, 1952	The Lusty Men	
October 30, 1952	Androcles and the Lion (Note: Owned by Valerie Delacorte and the Society of Authors, representing George Bernard Shaw, with U.S. distribution rights currently licensed to Janus Films and The Criterion Collection under the Eclipse brand)	Premiered in Los Angeles, wide release January 9, 1953
November 7, 1952	Montana Belle	Premiered in New York City, wide release November 11, 1952
November 14, 1952	Face to Face	
November 25, 1952	Hans Christian Andersen	Premiered in New York City, wide release December 19, 1952; distribution only; produced by Samuel Goldwyn Productions
December 24, 1952	Blackbeard the Pirate	
December 25, 1952	No Time for Flowers	Premiered in New York City, wide release January 31, 1953

=== 1953 ===
The year was another disaster for the studio, which was mired in lawsuits. The company returned to the control of Howard Hughes, but the studio released only 24 films during the year, the fewest total since their inaugural year of 1929, which had not been a full year. Of those 24 films, only 8 were actual RKO productions. Disney's Peter Pan, the Academy Award-winning documentary The Sea Around Us, and the 3-D Second Chance comprised the trio of highlights for the studio during 1953. On June 23, 1953, Walt Disney severed ties with RKO after a heated dispute with Hughes over the distribution of his True-Life Adventures series of nature documentaries, opting to form his own distribution company.

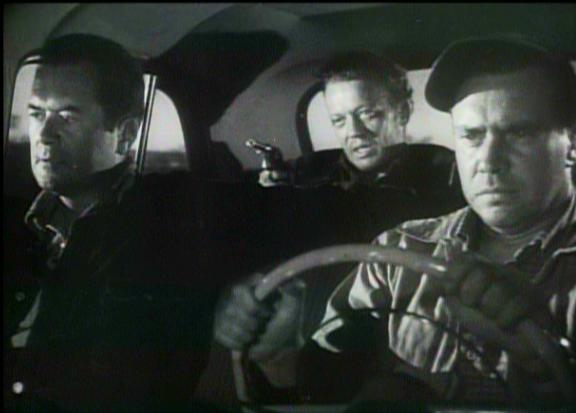
Frank Lovejoy, William Talman, and Edmond O'Brien in The Hitch-Hiker

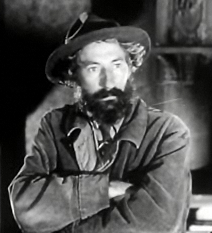
Arthur Hunnicutt in Split Second

Release date	Film	Notes
January 13, 1953	Decameron Nights	Premiered London, wide release on November 16, 1953
January 21, 1953	Sword of Venus	Premiered Los Angeles, wide release on February 20, 1953
January 28, 1953	Never Wave at a WAC	
February 4, 1953	Angel Face	Premiered Los Angeles, wide release on February 11, 1953
February 5, 1953	Peter Pan	Distribution only; produced by Walt Disney Productions
March 20, 1953	The Hitch-Hiker	
April 1, 1953	Count the Hours	
April 3, 1953	Port Sinister	Premiered Los Angeles, wide release on April 10, 1953
April 25, 1953*	The Big Frame	
May 2, 1953	Split Second	
May 23, 1953	Sea Devils	
June 8, 1953	Tarzan and the She-Devil	
June 20, 1953	Affair with a Stranger	
July 5, 1953*	Night Without Stars	
July 7, 1953*	The Sea Around Us	
July 18, 1953	Second Chance	
July 23, 1953	The Sword and the Rose	Distribution only; produced by Walt Disney Productions
July 29, 1953	Below the Sahara	Premiered Los Angeles, wide release on September 1, 1953
August 15, 1953	Devil's Canyon	
September 23, 1953	Marry Me Again	Premiered in Seattle, wide release on October 22, 1953
October 14, 1953	Louisiana Territory	Premiered in New Orleans, wide release on October 16, 1953
October 16, 1953	Appointment in Honduras	
December 29, 1953	The French Line	Premiered London, wide release on February 8, 1954

=== 1954 ===
Although Howard Hughes purchased all the outstanding shares of stock of the company, becoming the first individual to own a major studio since the era of silent films, the downward trajectory of RKO continued. Only 14 films were released, and there was not a single notable one among them.

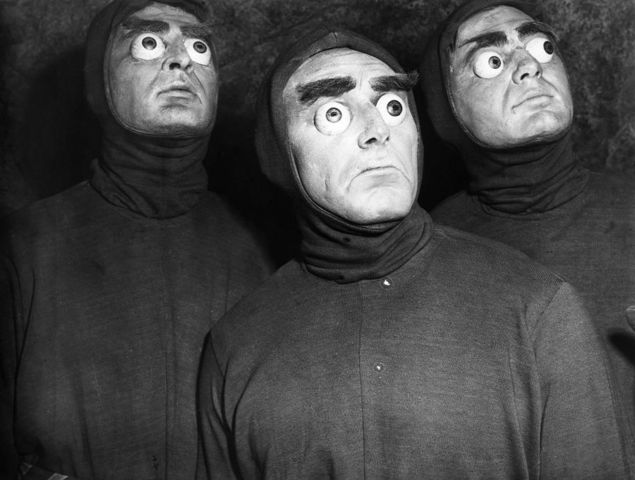
Publicity photo from Killers from Space

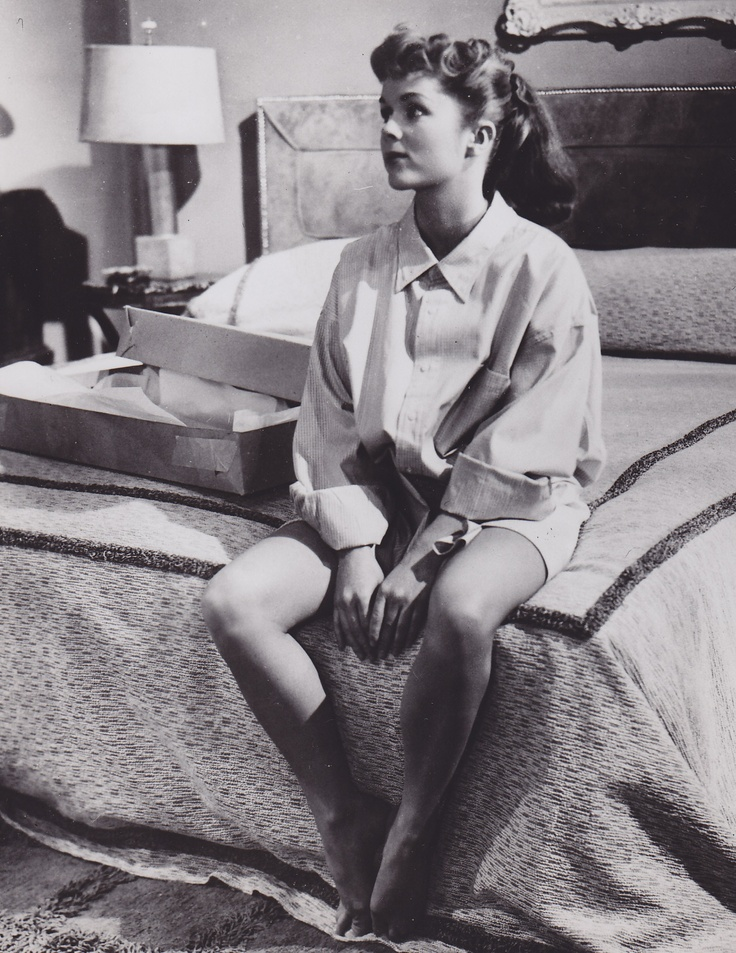
Publicity photo of Debbie Reynolds for Susan Slept Here

Release date	Film	Notes
January 23, 1954	Killers from Space	
February 15, 1954	She Couldn't Say No	
February 27, 1954	Rob Roy, the Highland Rogue	Premiered London, wide release on October 26, 1953; distribution only; produced by Walt Disney Productions
March 6, 1954	Dangerous Mission	
April 15, 1954	The Saint's Girl Friday	
April 16, 1954	Carnival Story	
June 1954*	Sins of Rome	
June 24, 1954	Silver Lode	
July 14, 1954	Susan Slept Here	
September 28, 1954	Africa Adventure	
October 6, 1954	Passion	
November 3, 1954	This Is My Love	Premiered Los Angeles, wide release on November 11, 1954
November 18, 1954	Cattle Queen of Montana	
October 10, 1954	Hansel and Gretel	Premiered in New York City, wide release on December 25, 1954; distribution only
December 14, 1954	Naked Sea	Premiered Long Beach, CA, wide release on December 13, 1955

=== 1955 ===
Howard Hughes sold RKO to General Teleradio in the middle of the year. Teleradio was the entertainment arm of the General Tire and Rubber Company, and had purchased the studio to gain access to its film library, which it intended to air on its small network of television stations. RKO became a division in the new company, RKO Teleradio Pictures. While the studio came up with its own version of the wide screen format, called Superscope, they would only release 14 films during the year, the only one of which was notable was the musical, Oklahoma!, which RKO distributed.

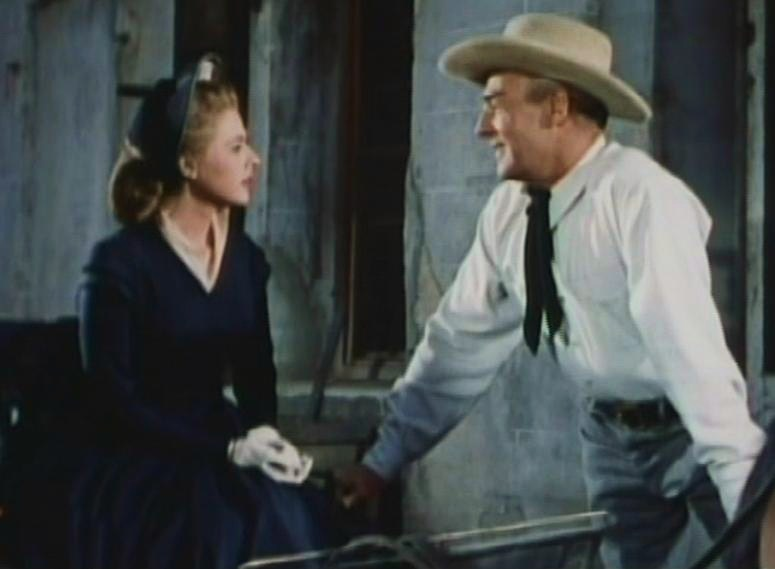
Mala Powers and Randolph Scott in Rage at Dawn

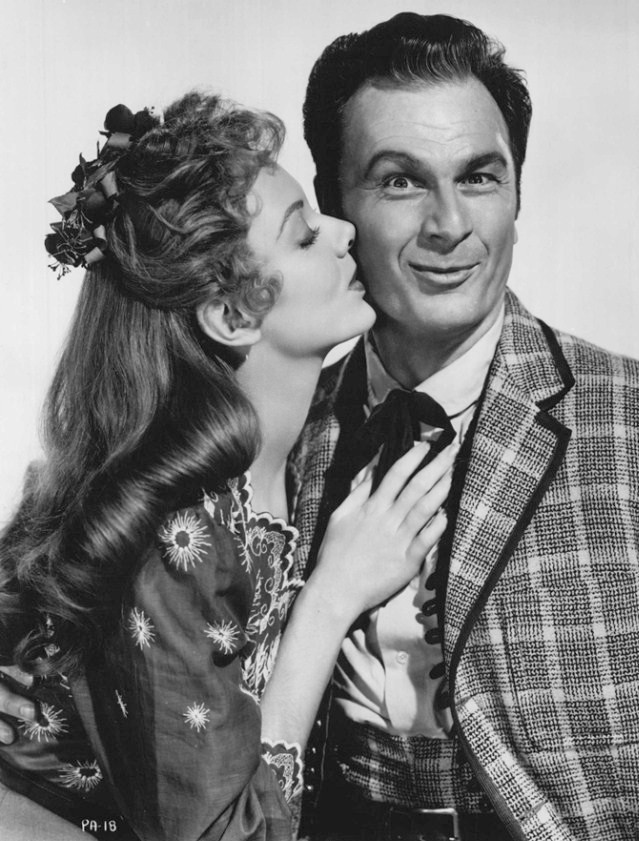
Publicity shot of Barbara Lawrence and Eddie Albert for Oklahoma!

Release date	Film	Notes
January 29, 1955	The Americano	
February 9, 1955	Underwater!	
February 16, 1955	Tarzan's Hidden Jungle	
March 26, 1955	Rage at Dawn	
April 9, 1955	Escape to Burma	
May 4, 1955	Quest for the Lost City	
June 1, 1955	Son of Sinbad	
June 29, 1955	Wakamba!	
July 4, 1955	Pearl of the South Pacific	
September 14, 1955	Bengazi	
September 21, 1955	Tennessee's Partner	
October 11, 1955	Oklahoma! (Note: Owned by Concord Originals and the estates of Rodgers and Hammerstein, with distribution rights currently licensed to Samuel Goldwyn Films)	Distribution only, and only for its first run; distributed for its second run by 20th Century Fox
October 19, 1955	The Treasure of Pancho Villa	
November 30, 1955	Texas Lady	

=== 1956 ===
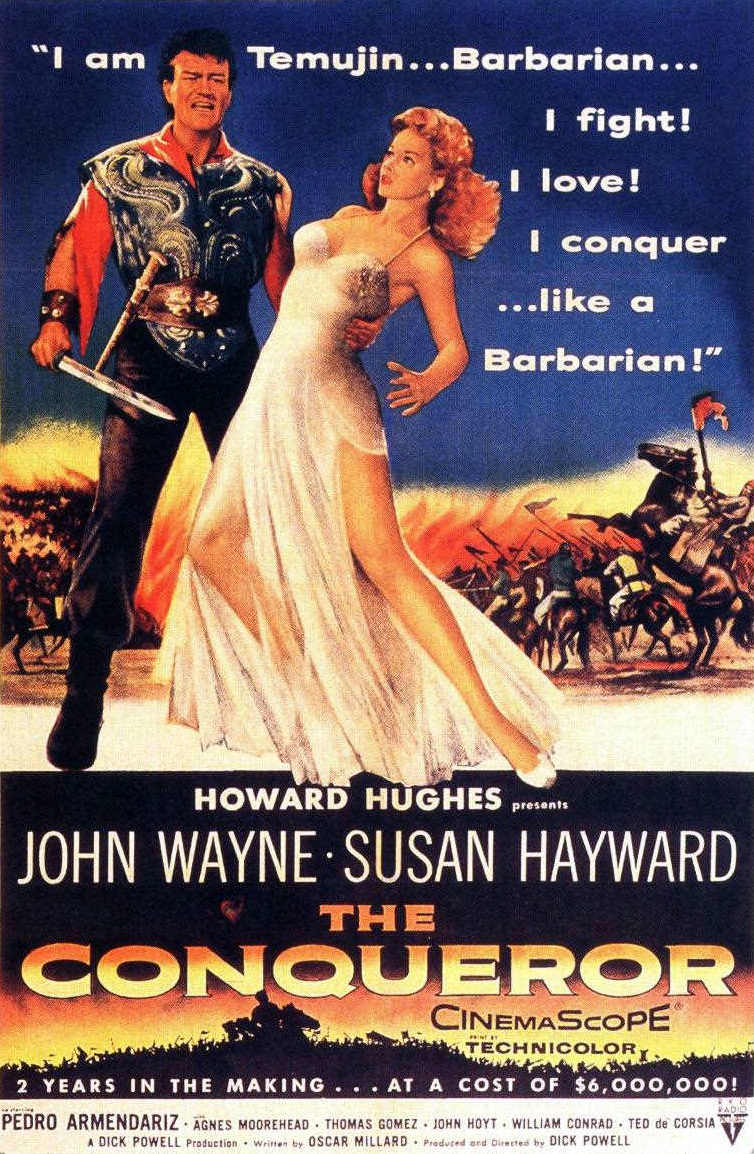
Theatrical poster for The Conqueror

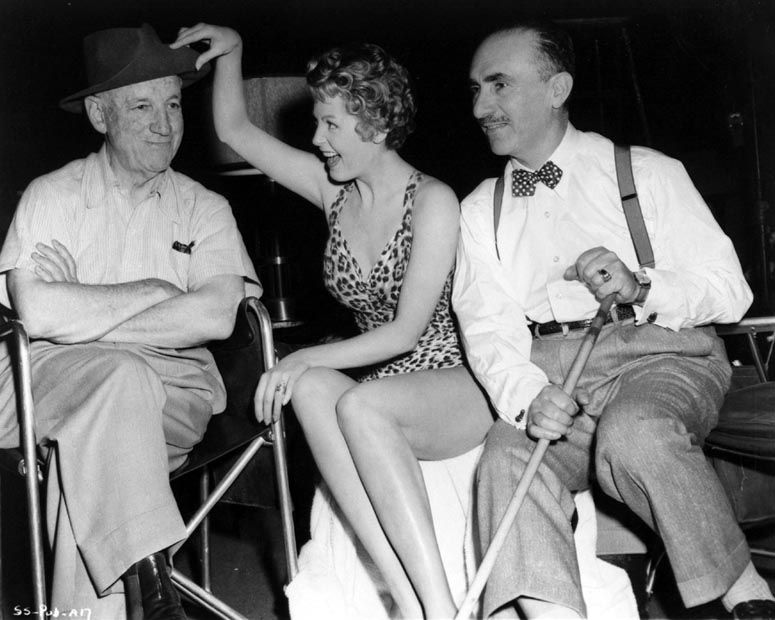
Publicity still of director Allan Dwan, Arlene Dahl, and cinematographer John Alton for Slightly Scarlet

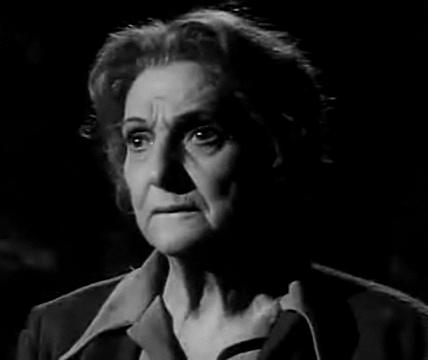
Beulah Bondi in Back from Eternity

While the studio increased its number of releases to 20 in 1956, by year's end the fact that RKO was looking to sell part of its distribution arm was a signal that the death knell was tolling for the studio. There were, however, a few notable films released, such as Fritz Lang's final two American films, While the City Sleeps, and Beyond a Reasonable Doubt. The studio's highest-grossing film of the year, The Conqueror, was also its biggest financial flop, since its $4.5 million in North American rentals did not come close to covering its $6 million cost.

Release date	Film	Notes
January 11, 1956	Glory	
January 18, 1956	Postmark for Danger	Released in Great Britain as Portrait of Alison
January 25, 1956	Cash on Delivery	Released in Great Britain as To Dorothy a Son
February 8, 1956	Slightly Scarlet	
February 22, 1956	The Conqueror (Note: Owned by Universal Pictures)	Premiered Los Angeles, wide release on March 28, 1956
February 1956*	The Brain Machine	
April 11, 1956	The Way Out	
April 18, 1956	The Bold and the Brave	
May 16, 1956	While the City Sleeps	Premiered in New York City, wide release on May 30, 1956; distribution only
May 16, 1956	Great Day in the Morning	
May 30, 1956*	Murder on Approval	
August 15, 1956*	The First Traveling Saleslady	
September 8, 1956	Back from Eternity	
September 13, 1956	Beyond a Reasonable Doubt	
October 3, 1956*	Tension at Table Rock	
October 17, 1956*	Finger of Guilt	Released in Great Britain as The Intimate Stranger
October 26, 1956	The Brave One	
November 5, 1956	Death of a Scoundrel	
December 19, 1956	Bundle of Joy	
December 21, 1956	Man in the Vault (Note: Owned by Batjac Productions, with distribution rights owned by Paramount Pictures)	Distribution only; produced by Batjac Productions

=== 1957 ===
This was the end of production for the original RKO Radio Pictures. All production was halted in January, and distribution was handled by Universal-International. Only 11 films were released, and none were noteworthy.

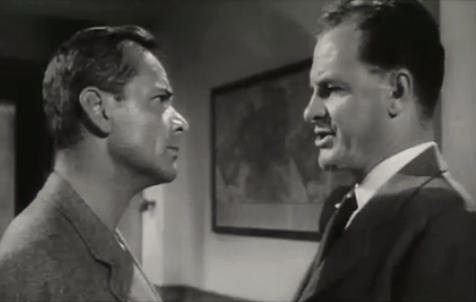
James Daly and James Gregory in The Young Stranger

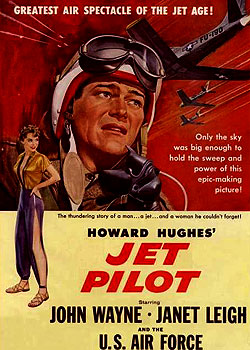
Poster for Jet Pilot

Release date	Film	Notes
April 7, 1957	The Young Stranger	
May 17, 1957	Public Pigeon No. 1	Premiered in Los Angeles, wide release June 5, 1957
September 2, 1957*	Cartouche	
July 25, 1957	Run of the Arrow	
September 25, 1957	Jet Pilot	Premiered in Los Angeles, wide release October 4, 1957
August 22, 1957	That Night!	
October 1957	The Unholy Wife	
November 13, 1957	All Mine to Give	Premiered in Oshkosh, Wisconsin; wide release January 1958
November 27, 1957	The Violators	
October 17, 1957	Escapade in Japan	Premiered in San Francisco, wide release November 1957
1957	Guilty?	

=== 1958–60 ===
While the studio was no longer producing films, it would release the 12 it had already made over the three-year period from 1958 to 1960.

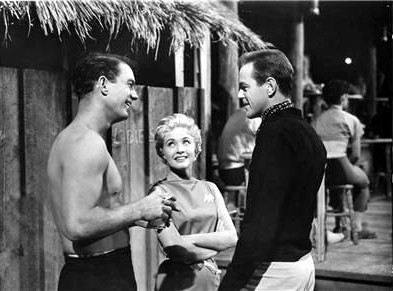
Cliff Robertson, Jane Powell, and Keith Andes in the 1958 film, The Girl Most Likely

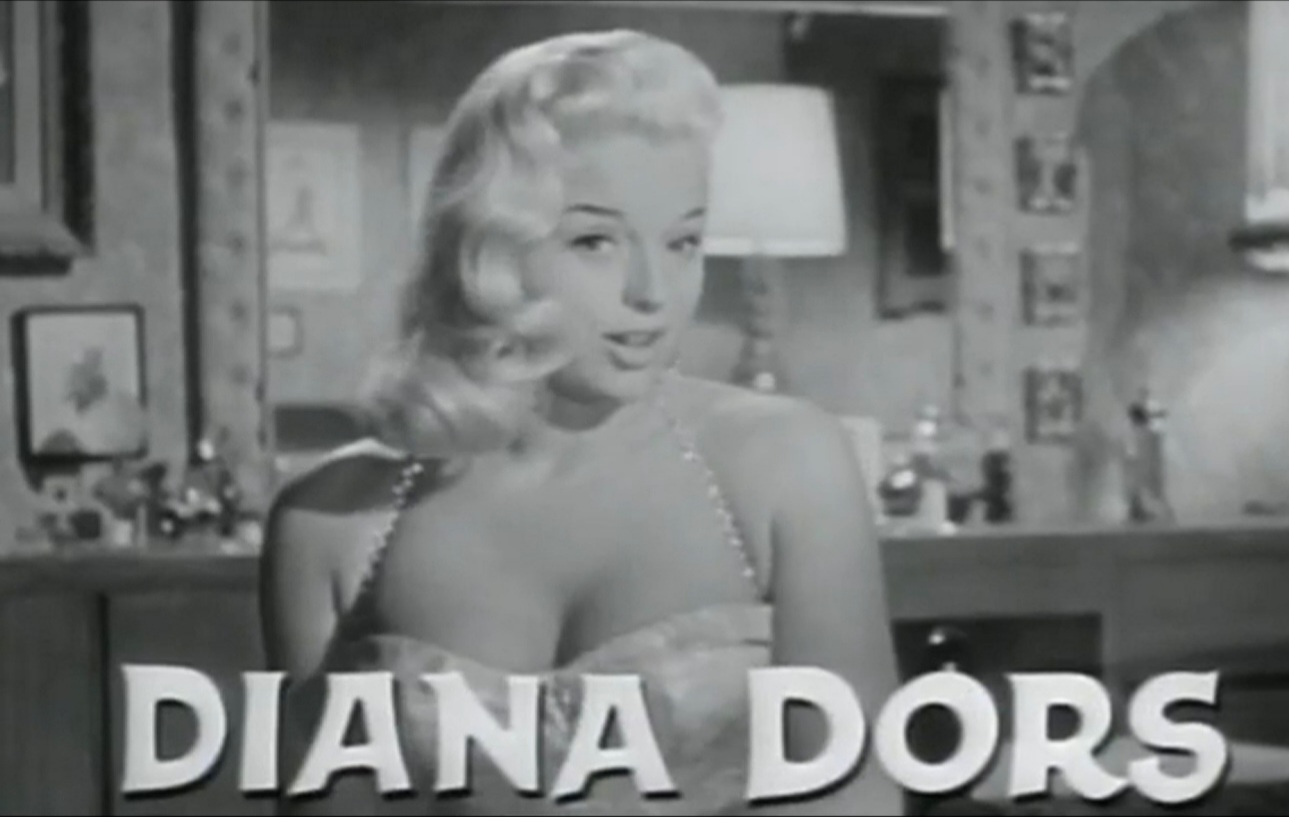
Diana Dors title card from I Married a Woman

Release date	Film	Notes
February 5, 1958	The Girl Most Likely	Production only; distributed by Universal Pictures
March 6, 1958*	Stage Struck	Production only; distributed by Buena Vista Distribution
May 14, 1958	I Married a Woman	Production only; distributed by Universal Pictures
August 6, 1958	The Naked and the Dead	Production only; distributed by Warner Bros. Pictures; final RKO release
November 6, 1958*	From the Earth to the Moon	Production only; distributed by Warner Bros. Pictures
November 8, 1958	Enchanted Island	Production only; distributed by Warner Bros. Pictures
March 13, 1959	Verboten!	Production only; distributed by Columbia Pictures
May 15, 1959*	The Mysterians	Production only; made in Japan in 1957 by Toho; distributed by Metro-Goldwyn-Mayer
June 1959	Home Is the Hero	Production only
July 16, 1959*	Desert Desperadoes	Distribution only; produced by Venturini Express and Nasht Productions
August 1959*	City After Midnight	Production only
February 15, 1960*	The Poacher's Daughter	Production only

== 1960s–1970s ==
RKO Pictures dissolved in 1958, and was reconstituted in 1978 by its parent corporation RKO General.

== 1980s: RKO Pictures Inc. ==
In 1978, RKO General created a subsidiary, RKO Pictures Inc. Three years later they began to produce a number of feature films and television projects. In collaboration with Universal Studios, RKO put out half a dozen films during the first half of the decade, although none met with much success. from 1985 to 1987 the studio produced several more films on their own, some with more acclaim such as Plenty (1985), Half Moon Street (1986) and Hamburger Hill (1987), but production ended when RKO General underwent a massive reorganization following an attempted hostile takeover, and the production company was eventually sold to Wesray Capital Corporation in late 1987.

Release date	Film	Notes
September 25, 1981	Carbon Copy	Co-production with Hemdale Film Corporation; distributed by AVCO Embassy Pictures
January 31, 1982	The Border	co-production with Universal Pictures
July 23, 1982	The Best Little Whorehouse in Texas	co-production with Universal Pictures
July 23, 1982	Cat People	co-production with Universal Pictures; remake of the 1942 film Cat People
December 16, 1983	D.C. Cab	co-production with Universal Pictures
1983	The Brass Ring	Television film
June 1, 1984	Streets of Fire	co-production with Universal Pictures
September 20, 1985	Plenty	Co-production with Pressmen Productions; distributed by 20th Century Fox
August 13, 1986	Half Moon Street	Co-production with Pressmen Productions; distributed by 20th Century Fox
1986	My Letter to George	Also released under the titles Mesmerized and Shocked
April 10, 1987	Campus Man	distributed by Paramount Pictures
May 8, 1987	Hot Pursuit	distributed by Paramount Pictures
August 28, 1987	Hamburger Hill	distributed by Paramount Pictures
September 10, 1987	The Lighthorsemen	Released in the United States: April 8, 1988
1987	Dark Age	Australian release

== 1990s–current: RKO Pictures LLC ==
In 1989, Wesray sold the company to Pavilion Communications, which renamed the entity RKO Pictures LLC. In its latest incarnation, the studio has been involved with several notable films, including Mighty Joe Young (1998), Shade (2003), Are We Done Yet? (2007), A Late Quartet (2012), and Barely Lethal (2015).

Release date	Film	Notes
June 8, 1990	False Identity	
October 17, 1991	It's All True	Documentary; co-producer
March 21, 1992	Laws of Gravity	
June 24, 1992	The Elegant Criminal	Distribution only
October 23, 1992	Frozen Assets	Distribution only
October 19, 1996	Milk & Money	co-producer
December 15, 1996	Holiday Affair	Television film
December 25, 1998	Mighty Joe Young	co-production with Walt Disney Pictures and The Jacobson Company
January 13, 2002	The Magnificent Ambersons	television film
May 4, 2003	The Gin Game	television film
June 21, 2003	Shade	co-production with Dimension Films
September 22, 2006	Laura Smiles	television film
April 4, 2007	Are We Done Yet?	co-production with Revolution Studios, Cube Vision and Columbia Pictures; remake of Mr. Blandings Builds His Dream House
September 11, 2009	Beyond a Reasonable Doubt	Distributed by Anchor Bay Films and After Dark Films; a remake of the 1956 film of the same name
November 2, 2012	A Late Quartet	co-production with Entertainment One
April 30, 2015	Barely Lethal	Distributed by A24, co-production with RatPac Entertainment

== Bibliography ==
- Jewell, Richard B. (2012). RKO Radio Pictures: A Titan Is Born. Berkeley and Los Angeles: University of California Press. ISBN 978-0-520-27178-4.
- Jewell, Richard B.; Harbin, Vernon (1982). The RKO Story. New York: Arlington House. ISBN 0-517-54656-6.
