= Russell Wade =

American actor (1917–2006)

Russel Wade
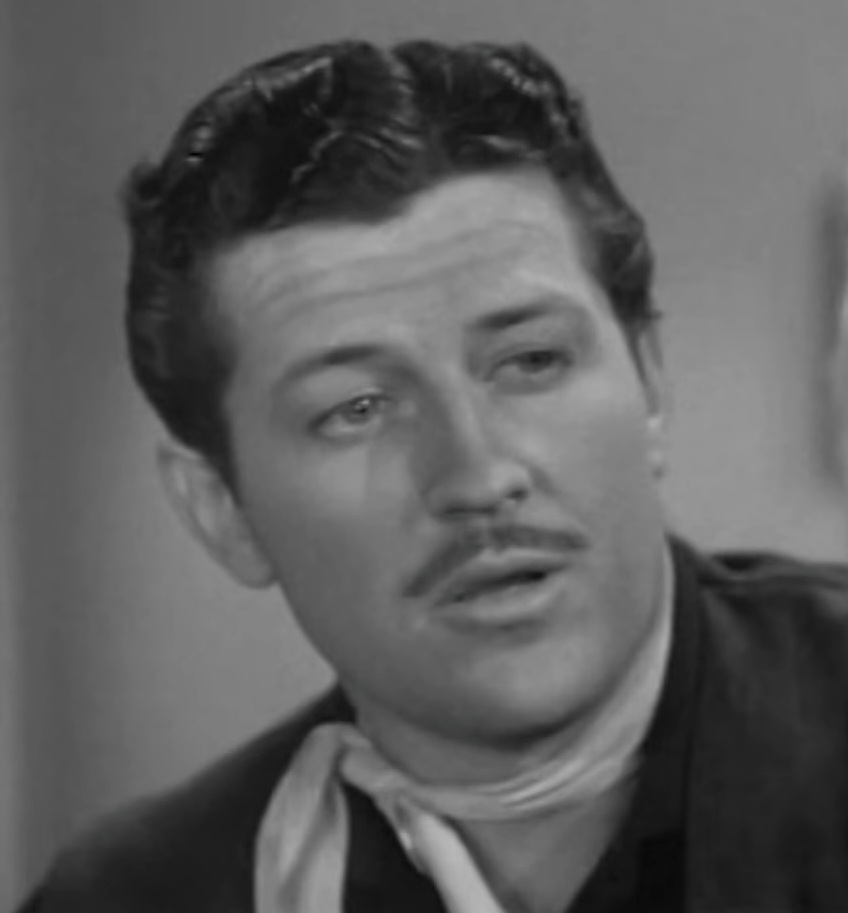
- Wade in Renegade Girl (1946)
- Born: June 22, 1917; Oklahoma City, Oklahoma, U.S.
- Died: December 9, 2006 (aged 89); Palm Springs, California, U.S.
- Occupation: Actor
- Years active: 1933–1948

Russell Wade (June 22, 1917 – December 9, 2006) was an American actor.

== Life and career ==
Russell Wade was born on June 21, 1917, in Oklahoma City, Oklahoma, USA. He signed an RKO contract in 1942. Having appeared in 80 films, his last one was Beyond Glory in 1948.

With a boost from actor Pat O'Brien, Wade moved up from being an extra to having a role that was "expanded and tailored" for him in The Iron Major (1943).

== Death ==
On December 9, 2006, Wade died in Palm Springs, California, at age 89.

== Selected filmography ==
- The Wrecker (1933) - Chuck Regan (first appearance)
- Fighting Youth (1935) - Buck's Roommate
- The House of a Thousand Candles (1936) - Young Man (uncredited)
- We Went to College (1936) - Student (uncredited)
- Postal Inspector (1936) - Man (uncredited)
- My Man Godfrey (1936) - Socialite at Scavenger Hunt (uncredited)
- Yellowstone (1936) - Bellboy (uncredited)
- The Girl on the Front Page (1936) - Elevator Operator (uncredited)
- Ace Drummond (1936, Serial) - Second Co-Pilot (uncredited)
- Flying Hostess (1936) - Kansas City Radio Operator (uncredited)
- Pick a Star (1937) - Colonial Club Patron (uncredited)
- Topper (1937) - Nightclub Patron (uncredited)
- Double or Nothing (1937) - Nightclub Patron (uncredited)
- Music for Madame (1937) - Wedding Guest (uncredited)
- Hitting a New High (1937) - Nightclub Dance Extra (uncredited)
- The Goldwyn Follies (1938) - Party Guest (uncredited)
- Under Western Stars (1938) - Fairview Country Club Guest (uncredited)
- Vivacious Lady (1938) - Ball Guest (uncredited)
- Hold That Kiss (1938) - Wedding Reception Guest (uncredited)
- Kentucky Moonshine (1938) - Young Man in Hotel Lobby (uncredited)
- Three Blind Mice (1938) - Nightclub Patron (uncredited)
- Letter of Introduction (1938) - Young Autograph Seeker's Escort (uncredited)
- Three Loves Has Nancy (1938) - Party Guest (uncredited)
- My Lucky Star (1938) - Student (uncredited)
- Fugitives for a Night (1938) - Man in Tenwright's Outer Office (uncredited)
- Straight Place and Show (1938) - Race Track Spectator (uncredited)
- The Mad Miss Manton (1938) - Charity Ball Guest (uncredited)
- Spring Madness (1938) - Dartmouth College Student (uncredited)
- You Can't Cheat an Honest Man (1939) - Wedding Guest (uncredited)
- Three Smart Girls Grow Up (1939) - Guest (uncredited)
- Sorority House (1939) - Dance Extra (uncredited)
- Million Dollar Legs (1939) - Student (uncredited)
- Indianapolis Speedway (1939) - Dance Extra (uncredited)
- These Glamour Girls (1939) - College Boy (uncredited)
- First Love (1939) - Ball Guest (uncredited)
- Broadway Melody of 1940 (1940) - Nightclub Dancer (uncredited)
- Black Friday (1940) - Student (uncredited)
- Road to Singapore (1940) - Yacht Party Guest (uncredited)
- Star Dust (1940) - Theatre Audience Attendee (uncredited)
- My Favorite Wife (1940) - Bellhop (uncredited)
- Turnabout (1940) - Officer Worker in Corridor (uncredited)
- Andy Hardy Meets Debutante (1940) - Party Guest (uncredited)
- My Love Came Back (1940) - Party Guest (uncredited)
- Flowing Gold (1940) - Chalmers' Chauffeur (uncredited)
- One Night in the Tropics (1940) - Nightclub Patron (uncredited)
- Lady with Red Hair (1940) - Theatregoer (uncredited)
- Mr. & Mrs. Smith (1941) - Nightclub Patron (uncredited)
- I'll Wait for You (1941) - Nightclub Extra (uncredited)
- Moon Over Miami (1941) - Jeff's Friend (uncredited)
- Sun Valley Serenade (1941) - Nightclub Patron (uncredited)
- Unexpected Uncle (1941) - Colony Club Patron (uncredited)
- Niagara Falls (1941) - Newlywed on Beach (uncredited)
- Week-End for Three (1941) - Old Field Inn Patron (uncredited)
- Keep 'Em Flying (1941) - Young Flyer (uncredited)
- Ball of Fire (1941) - Nightclub Patron (uncredited)
- Captains of the Clouds (1942) - Flyer in Nightclub (uncredited)
- My Gal Sal (1942) - Restaurant Patron (uncredited)
- A Desperate Chance for Ellery Queen (1942) - Gambling Casino Patron (uncredited)
- They All Kissed the Bride (1942) - Wedding Guest (uncredited)
- The Big Street (1942) - Minor Role (uncredited)
- Bandit Ranger (1942) - Tex - Clay's Ranchhand
- Highways by Night (1942) - Bartender (uncredited)
- Army Surgeon (1942) - Soldier-Patient (uncredited)
- Pirates of the Prairie (1942) - Vigilante (uncredited)
- Red River Robin Hood (1942) - Chet Andrews
- The Great Gildersleeve (1942) - Charles - Governor's Chauffeur (uncredited)
- Fighting Frontier (1943) - Young Henchman (uncredited)
- Ladies' Day (1943) - Ball Player (uncredited)
- Sagebrush Law (1943) - Banty - Cowhand (uncredited)
- Gildersleeve's Bad Day (1943) - Jimmy
- Bombardier (1943) - Paul Harris
- The Leopard Man (1943) - Man in Black Car / Man Outside Graveyard (uncredited)
- The Falcon in Danger (1943) - The Pilot (uncredited)
- The Man from Down Under (1943) - Ringsider (uncredited)
- The Fallen Sparrow (1943) - Florist (uncredited)
- The Iron Major (1943) - Private Manning
- The Ghost Ship (1943) - 3rd Officer Tom Merriam / Tertius
- Higher and Higher (1943) - Night Club Patron (uncredited)
- Marine Raiders (1944) - Lt. Tony 'Junior' Hewitt
- Tall in the Saddle (1944) - Clint Harolday
- The Body Snatcher (1945) - Donald Fettes
- A Game of Death (1945) - Robert Trowbridge
- The Bamboo Blonde (1946) - Patrick Ransom, Jr.
- Renegade Girl (1946) - Jerry Long
- Shoot to Kill (1947) - George Mitchell
- Beyond Glory (1948) - Cadet Jensen (final film role)
