= Desert Passage (film) =

1952 film by Lesley Selander

- Theatrical release poster
- Directed by: Lesley Selander
- Written by: Norman Houston
- Produced by: Herman Schlom
- Starring: Tim Holt; Richard Martin; Dorothy Patrick
- Cinematography: J. Roy Hunt
- Edited by: Paul Weatherwax
- Music by: Paul Sawtell
- Distributed by: RKO Radio Pictures
- Release date: May 13, 1952
- Running time: 62 minutes
- Country: United States
- Language: English
- Budget: $99,000
- Box office: $145,000

Desert Passage is a 1952 American Western film directed by Lesley Selander and starring Tim Holt, Richard Martin and Dorothy Patrick. It is the last of the 46 Westerns in which Holt starred for RKO Radio Pictures.

== Plot ==
Tim Holt and old sidekick Chito Rafferty are considering leaving the stagecoach business when they encounter John Carver, a prison parolee who supposedly has hidden a stash of stolen loot. Everyone else whom they encounter is also seeking the money.

== Cast ==
- Tim Holt as Holt
- Richard Martin as Rafferty
- Walter Reed as Carver
- John Dehner as Bronson
- Joan Dixon as Emily
- Dorothy Patrick as Roxie
- Denver Pyle as Allen
- Clayton Moore as Warwick

== Reception ==
The film recorded a loss of $30,000. Holt's films had been losing money over the past few years, so RKO Radio Pictures stopped the series.

== External list ==
- Desert Passage at IMDb
- Desert Passage at the TCM Movie Database (archived)
- Desert Passage at the AFI Catalog of Feature Films
