= Come on Danger =

1942 film by Edward Killy

- Theatrical release poster
- Directed by: Edward Killy
- Written by: Bennett Cohen
- Screenplay by: Norton S. Parker
- Produced by: Bert Gilroy
- Starring: Tim Holt
- Cinematography: Harry J. Wild
- Edited by: Frederic Knudtson
- Music by: Paul Sawtell
- Distributed by: RKO Radio Pictures
- Release date: June 5, 1942 (U.S.)
- Running time: 59 min
- Country: United States
- Language: English

Come on Danger is a 1942 American Western film directed by Edward Killy. It was a remake of a 1932 Tom Keene film. The story was bought for Holt in June 1941.

== Cast ==
- Tim Holt as Jack Mason
- Frances E. Neal as Ann Jordan (as Frances Neal)
- Ray Whitley as Smokey
- Lee 'Lasses' White as Whopper
- Karl Hackett as Ott Ramsey
- Malcolm 'Bud' McTaggart as Russ
- Glenn Strange as Henchman Sloan
- Evelyn Dockson as Aunt Fanny (as Evlynn Dockson)
- Davison Clark as Ranger Captain Blake
- John Elliott as Saunders
- Slim Whitaker as Sheriff (as 'Slim' Whitaker)
- Kate Harrington as Maggie
- Henry Roquemore as Jed

== External list ==
- Come on Danger at IMDb
- Come on Danger at the TCM Movie Database (archived version)
- Come on Danger at the AFI Catalog of Feature Films
