= The Arizona Ranger =

1948 film

- Theatrical release poster
- Directed by: John Rawlins
- Written by: Norman Houston
- Produced by: Herman Schlom
- Starring: Tim Holt; Jack Holt; Nan Leslie
- Cinematography: J. Roy Hunt
- Edited by: Desmond Marquette
- Music by: Paul Sawtell
- Production company: RKO
- Distributed by: RKO Radio Pictures
- Release date: March 23, 1948 (U.S.)
- Running time: 63 mins
- Country: United States
- Language: English

The Arizona Ranger is a 1948 American Western film directed by John Rawlins and starring Tim Holt and his father Jack.

RKO head of production Dore Schary, impressed by the Holts being in The Treasure of the Sierra Madre, gave the film a bigger budget than Holt Westerns normally received.

== Plot ==
Bob Morgan is mustered out of Teddy Roosevelt's Rough Riders to join the Arizona Rangers. However Bob's father, Rawhide Morgan, wants him to help run Rawhide's cattle ranch. Instead, Bob tells his friend, Chito Rafferty, to stay and assist with the farm. Rawhide resents Bob leaving the ranch. Bob arrests Nimino Welch, a fugitive from justice, and member of Quirt Butler's gang. During Nimino's transfer to prison, the stagecoach is attacked by Quirt. Nimino is freed, but while riding off, Quirt is wounded by gunfire when Ben Riddle and Rawhide intervene. Bob trails Quirt to his house where Quirt's wife, Laura, lies as to Quirt's whereabouts. Quirt notices Bob and Laura are attracted to each other.

Rawhide fires Chito who happily leaves to join Bob's rangers. Quirt's gang rustle Rawhide's cattle, killing Ben Riddle. Rawhide and his farm hands arrive at Quirt's house and take him away to be lynched, assuming he was the one who killed Ben. Laura reports the abduction to Bob, who realizes Laura lied earlier about Quirt's whereabouts.

Bob intervenes to prevent his father from hanging Quirt. Rawhide hits Bob and rides off with the lynch mob. Bob is stunned that his own father would strike him. Chito arrives and takes Quirt into custody. Laura returns home to find henchmen Nimino and Jaspar Todd waiting for Quirt. She convinces the men to remain at her home while she tells Bob, who is holding Quirt at the jail. Bob and the other rangers leave town to arrest Nimino and Jaspar.

With Bob away, the rest of Quirt's gang ride into town to free him. During the melee, they shoot up the town and kill one of the rangers who stayed behind. Bob returns to find his colleague dead, and accuses Laura of being part of the plot to free Quirt. Bob is relieved of his duties by the governor. In a show of loyalty, Chito quits. Bob heads to Laura's house. Nimino and Jaspar arrive to retrieve Laura, but she refuses to go. Bob arrives and a fight ensues, during which Laura shoots Nimino. Jaspar escapes with Bob in pursuit. Quirt and his gang force Bob off his horse, but Bob resists and a gunfight ensues. Meanwhile, Laura seeks help from Rawhide who initially refuses, but has a change of heart. Bob runs out of ammunition just as Rawhide and his farm hands arrive and chase off the gang. Bob tries to subdue Quirt who is shot and killed by Rawhide. Father and son are reconciled.

Rawhide apologizes to the newly widowed Laura and asks to escort her as she leaves town on the stagecoach. Chito tells Bob he needs to intervene before Laura becomes his mother rather than his wife. Bob hurriedly rides off in pursuit of the stagecoach.

== Cast ==
- Tim Holt as Bob Morgan
- Jack Holt as Rawhide Morgan
- Nan Leslie as Laura Butler
- Richard Martin as Chito Rafferty
- Steve Brodie as Quirt Butler
- Paul Hurst as Ben Riddle
- James Nolan as Nimino Welch (as Jim Nolan)
- Robert Bray as Jasper Todd
- Richard Benedict as Ranger Gills
- William Phipps as Ranger Mac
- Harry Harvey as Payton - Stagecoach Agent

== Rest of cast listed alphabetically ==
- Lane Chandler as Captain G.W. McNeill (uncredited)
- Chick Hannan as Henchman (uncredited)
- Frank Matts as Cowhand (uncredited)
- Herman Nowlin as Herman - Stage Driver (uncredited)
- Chuck Roberson as Henchman (uncredited)
- Brick Sullivan as Townsman (uncredited)

== External list ==
- The Arizona Ranger at IMDb
- The Arizona Ranger at the TCM Movie Database (archived)
- The Arizona Ranger at the AFI Catalog of Feature Films
