= The Bandit Trail =

1941 film by Edward Killy

- Theatrical release poster
- Directed by: Edward Killy
- Screenplay by: Norton S. Parker
- Story by: Arthur T. Horman
- Produced by: Bert Gilroy
- Starring: Tim Holt
- Cinematography: Harry J. Wild
- Edited by: Frederic Knudtson
- Music by: Paul Sawtell
- Production company: RKO Radio Pictures
- Distributed by: RKO Radio Pictures
- Release date: October 10, 1941 (U.S.)
- Running time: 59-61 mins
- Country: United States
- Language: English
- Budget: $45,000

The Bandit Trail is a 1941 American western film directed by Edward Killy.

== Plot ==
A cowboy helps rob a bank to get revenge on an unscrupulous banker.

== Cast ==
- Tim Holt as Steve Haggerty
- Ray Whitley as Smokey
- Janet Waldo as Ellen Grant
- Lee 'Lasses' White as Whopper
- Morris Ankrum as Red Haggerty
- Roy Barcroft as Joel Nesbitt
- Glenn Strange as Gang member

== External list ==
- The Bandit Trail at IMDb
- The Bandit Trail at the TCM Movie Database (archived version)
- The Bandit Trail at the AFI Catalog of Feature Films
