= Along the Rio Grande =

1941 film by Edward Killy

- Theatrical release poster
- Directed by: Edward Killy
- Written by: Stuart Anthony
- Produced by: Bert Gilroy
- Starring: Tim Holt; Betty Jane Rhodes; Ray Whitley
- Cinematography: Frank Redman
- Edited by: Frederic Knudtson
- Music by: Paul Sawtell
- Production company: RKO Radio Pictures
- Distributed by: RKO Radio Pictures
- Release date: February 7, 1941
- Running time: 64 minutes
- Country: United States
- Language: English

Along the Rio Grande is a 1941 American Western film directed by Edward Killy and starring Tim Holt. The female lead was Betty Jane Rhodes.

== Plot ==
A young cowhand and two friends join forces to avenge the murder of their former boss.

Cattle rustler Doc Randall holds a gun on rancher Pop Edwards while three hands, Jeff, Smokey and Whopper, are making a deposit for Pop at the bank. The boys get word Pop needs the money back, but when the banker refuses, they steal it and flee, chased by a posse. They return to find Pop dead. They are arrested, although the sheriff is sure someone else did the killing.

After an arrest and a jailbreak, cantina singer Mary Lawry doesn't care to get involved with Jeff until he confides he's working undercover for the law. Doc is tipped off by saloon girl Paula, who overhears Jeff's conversation with Mary. A trap is set, but Jeff and Doc trade punches until Smokey arrives with the lawmen, just in time.

== Cast ==
- Tim Holt as Jeff
- Betty Jane Rhodes as Mary
- Ray Whitley as Smokey
- Robert Fiske as Doc
- Ruth Clifford as Paula
- Emmett Lynn as Whopper

== External list ==
- Along the Rio Grande at IMDb
- Along the Rio Grande at the TCM Movie Database (archived)
- Along the Rio Grande at the AFI Catalog of Feature Films
