= Saddle Legion =

1951 film by Lesley Selander

- Directed by: Lesley Selander
- Written by: Ed Earl Repp
- Produced by: Herman Schlom
- Starring: Tim Holt; Dorothy Malone
- Cinematography: J. Roy Hunt
- Edited by: Desmond Marquette
- Music by: Paul Sawtell; Constantin Bakaleinikoff
- Distributed by: RKO Radio Pictures
- Release date: April 20, 1951 (US)
- Running time: 60 minutes
- Country: United States
- Language: English

Saddle Legion is a 1951 American Western film directed by Lesley Selander and starring Tim Holt and Dorothy Malone, who was borrowed from Warner Bros.

== Plot ==
In the Old West, Dave Saunders and sidekick Chito Rafferty seek jobs as cowhands with rancher Fred Warren. Warren's cowhand Gabe drunkenly causes a stampede and shoots Warren, injuring him. Gabe rides away, but Dave captures him. Chito escorts Dr. Ann Rollins to the ranch to treat Warren. Gabe, held captive at the Warren ranch, escapes over the Mexican border.

In Mexico, Gabe meets with bar owner Ace Kelso, who hires him to rustle Warren's cattle. Kelso's gang ambush and kill Graham, the cattle inspector. Kelso's henchman Regan steals Graham's credentials in order to pose as Graham. Chito discovers Gabe around Warren's herd suspiciously tending to a calf and confronts him. Gabe knocks Chito down and escapes. Regan, posing as Graham, inspects the herd and determines that a calf (the same one that Chito saw with Gabe) shows evidence of blackleg disease and says that Warren's entire herd must be condemned and destroyed. Dave becomes suspicious and orders the inspectors held until Chito can return Warren. After Warren returns with Chito and two other local ranchers, the ranchers confirm that the calf has blackleg.

Anticipating destruction of his herd, Warren can no longer employ Dave and Chito, who return to Dr. Rollins asking whether she knows anything about blackleg. Dr. Rollins researches the disease and tells them that it could also be dangerous to humans. Returning to Warren's ranch to warn him, Dave and Chito see Gabe and Regan together with the injured calf. Dave becomes suspicious and he and Chito follow Gabe to Kelso's bar. Kelso starts a fight with Dave and Chito in order to have the Mexican police arrest them. Dave and Chito escape back across the border. Dave suspects that Kelso and Graham are conspiring to rustle Warren's cattle. Dr. Rollins goes to the chief cattle inspector, John Layton, for help. Dave and Chito arrive and advise Layton about Kelso. Layton suspects that an imposter is posing as Graham. Dave and Chito locate Regan (as Graham) with Layton's written order to not move the herd. Regan rides across the border to warn Kelso. Dave and Chito follow him to Kelso's bar and overhear Kelso's plan to rustle Warren's cattle across the border. Chito rides for help while Dave follows Kelso's gang. Dave surprises Gabe and Kelso's henchman Hooker. Dave kills Hooker, who draws a gun on him. Dave holds Gabe hostage when Kelso's gang arrives, but they kill Gabe, leaving Dave undefended. A gunfight ensues between Dave and the rest of the gang. Chito returns with Warren and the other ranchers. Dave's ammunition supply is exhausted just as Chito arrives with help and subdues the gang. Dave and Chito leave to take the cattle to market. Chito, who usually flees from romantic commitments, asks Dr. Rollins to wait for him until his return.

== Cas ==
- Tim Holt as Dave Saunders
- Dorothy Malone as Dr. Ann Rollins
- Richard Martin as Chito Rafferty
- Movita Castaneda as Mercedes
- Mauritz Hugo as Ace Kelso
- James Bush as Gabe
- Robert Livingston as Regan – Henchman
- Cliff Clark as Fred Warren
- Stanley Andrews as Chief John Layton
- George J. Lewis as Mexican Police Captain
- Dick Foote as Sandy
- Robert J. Wilke as Hooker – Henchman
