= Red River Robin Hood =

1942 film by Lesley Selander

- Theatrical release poster
- Directed by: Lesley Selander
- Written by: Bennett Cohen
- Produced by: Bert Gilroy
- Cinematography: J. Roy Hunt
- Edited by: Les Millbrook
- Distributed by: RKO Radio Pictures
- Release date: November 6, 1942
- Running time: 57 min.
- Country: United States
- Language: English

Red River Robin Hood is a 1942 American Western film directed by Lesley Selander with a screenplay by Bennett Cohen and starring Tim Holt. It was released by RKO Radio Pictures.

The plot was inspired by Zorro. This was the last Tim Holt Western until after the war.

== Plot ==
In the Old West, Scott Yager wins a court case upholding an old Spanish land grant which gives him ownership of much of the ranching land around the town of Red River. The angry ranchers must now give up their land to Yager, or become his tenants. Cowhand Jim Carey, and his sidekick, Ike, have left their former employer to return to Jim's ranch and his business partner, Chet Andrews. They learn from the newspaper editor, Sam Sterling, about Yager's case and that Chet is in jail for resisting an officer. They also meet his daughter, Carol. Yager's men disrupt Sterling's office because of Sterling's negative editorials. The sheriff intercedes, but after the fight, Ike discovers a tin star stuck to his shirt. Jim and Ike use the star as a ruse to free Chet. The sheriff discovers the escape, but Jim, Ike and Chet get away. Because the ranchers don't have enough money to pay Yager rent for very long, the trio decide that Jim and Ike will return Chet as a "prisoner" under a ruse of a double-cross to gain Yager's trust. Yager takes them in to his gang.

Jim and Ike go undercover as masked men and leave messages to the ranchers to "stay and fight" signed by "Mr. Justice." The pair then rob Yager's men of the rent they collect and return it to the ranchers. Jim and Ike return to Yager and claim they, too, were robbed by Mr. Justice. Yager and his gang report the robberies to the sheriff and Yager decides to evict the ranchers, who, under the law, have 30 days to leave.

Sam Sterling questions the authenticity of the land grant and sets out to prove it is fake. Jim reports to Yager that he should put the land grant document in a safe place after overhearing people talking about it. As Yager retrieves the document, Jim and Ike accost him as "Mr. Justice," knock Yager unconscious and give the document to Sterling who reviews it and returns it. Yager regains consciousness and finds Jim and Ike tied up outside, claiming Mr. Justice ambushed them. Yager concludes Sterling wanted to look at the document and likely knows who Mr. Justice is. Yager confronts Sterling and Carol at the newspaper office. Jim and Ike are hiding out there. They put out the lights and a fight ensues after which Jim, Ike and the Sterlings get away. Jim and Ike return and, with Yager, discover the capes and masks worn by Mr. Justice.

Yager tells two of his henchmen to dress up as Mr. Justice and retrieve his rent money. As Carol is obtaining petition signatures to re-open the case, she is resisted by the ranchers who were robbed by Mr. Justice (Yager's henchmen). Jim and Ike's cover is blown and they are taken hostage by Yager. Carol suspects Yager's men are posing as Mr. Justice, rounds up a posse, and heads to Yager's ranch. Meanwhile, Jim and Ike engage in a skirmish with Yager and his men. Yager escapes and Jim pursues him. Ike subdues the henchmen as Carol and the posse arrive. Jim subdues Yager. Yager and his men are given long prison sentences. Carol and Jim embrace and Ike comically falls off a ladder as he re-enacts the final skirmish with Yager and his men.

== Cast ==
- Tim Holt as Jim Carey
- Cliff Edwards as Ike
- Barbara Moffett as Carol Sterling
- Eddie Dew as Scott Yager
- Otto Hoffman as Sam Sterling
- Russell Wade as Chet Andrews
- Tom London as Sheriff Del Auston
- Earle Hodgins as Deputy Pete
- Malcolm 'Bud' McTaggart as Henchman Denver
- Reed Howes as Henchman Buck Owens
- Kenne Duncan as Henchman Ed Rance
