= Riding the Wind =

1942 film by Edward Killy

- Directed by: Edward Killy
- Written by: Bernard McConville
- Screenplay by: Morton Grant; Earle Snell
- Produced by: Bert Gilroy
- Starring: Tim Holt; Ray Whitley
- Cinematography: Harry J. Wild
- Edited by: Frederic Knudtson
- Music by: Paul Sawtell
- Distributed by: RKO Radio Pictures
- Release date: February 27, 1942
- Running time: 60 minutes
- Country: United States
- Language: English

Riding the Wind is a 1942 American Western film directed by Edward Killy and starring Tim Holt.

== Plot ==
A cowboy fights against a schemer who is manipulating water rights.

== Cast ==
- Tim Holt as Clay Stewart
- Ray Whitley as Smokey
- Joan Barclay as Joan Westfall(as Mary Douglas)
- Lee 'Lasses' White as Whopper
- Eddie Dew as Henry Dodge
- Ernie Adams as Jones
- Earle Hodgins as Bert MacLeod
- Kate Harrington as Martha MacLeod
