= Charles John Holt =

Charles John Holt may refer to:

- Jack Holt (actor)
- Tim Holt, his actor grandson
