= Ray Whitley (singer-songwriter) =

American singer (1901–1979)

Raymond Otis Whitley
- Born: December 5, 1901; Atlanta, Georgia, U.S.
- Died: February 21, 1979 (aged 77)
- Genres: Country, Western
- Occupations: Singer-songwriter, musician, actor
- Instrument: Guitar
- Labels: Okeh, Apollo Records, Decca Records
- Formerly of: Frank Luther Trio, The Range Ramblers, Ray Whitley and The Six Bar Cowboys

Raymond Otis Whitley (December 5, 1901 – February 21, 1979) was a country and western singer, songwriter, and actor, best known for writing the Western song "Back in the Saddle Again". His career in film lasted between 1936 and 1956.

== Early life ==
Whitley was born in Atlanta, Georgia, United States. He had traveled to New York where he became a construction worker on the Empire State Building and the George Washington Bridge.

== Career ==
=== Singing, music groups and live performance ===
Whitley began his singing career in New York City, New York in 1930.

While working as a steelworker, he heard of an audition at a local radio station. He was hired as a pop singer and learned a few chords on a guitar to back himself. Soon he was backed by professional musicians, including the Frank Luther Trio.

He formed "The Range Ramblers" and began to broadcast on WMCA. He then traveled with the World's Championship Rodeo organization, under the ownership of Colonel Johnson, renaming his band "Ray Whitley and The Six Bar Cowboys." Whitley was skilled in the use of the stock whip and could remove a cigarette from a man's lips with a single stroke, using either hand.

Whitley recorded for several record labels, including Okeh, Apollo Records and Decca.

=== Development of the Gibson SJ-200 ===
In 1937, Whitley had worked with Gibson on the production of the Gibson SJ-200 acoustic guitar, which was initially known as the "Super Jumbo". Whitley used his own time and money to design a guitar, which he took to Gibson. He explained the features and merits of the instrument, suggesting that by presenting them to other stars of the day, would result in really putting the Gibson name on the musical instrument map. As a result, Whitley was the first performer to own a Gibson SJ-200, which is on display in the Country Music Hall of Fame Museum. The SJ-200 has since become an American icon, and has been played by hundreds of different guitarists over the years.

=== Motion pictures ===
In 1937, Whitley was signed by RKO Radio Pictures as a specialty performer in the studio's "B" westerns starring George O'Brien, and O'Brien's successor Tim Holt. RKO also gave Whitley a starring series of his own: 18 two-reel musical short subjects, produced between 1937 and 1942.

In the late 1950s, Whitley made appearances on the Roy Rogers TV specials, he also appeared in the feature film Giant starring Elizabeth Taylor, Rock Hudson, and James Dean.

Whitley wrote the Western tune "Back in the Saddle Again". The song was first performed by him in the Western movie Border G-Man, in which he played the part of 'Luke Jones'. Gene Autry heard it and bought the song for a reported $200, making it his theme song. Whitley and Autry changed the order of the verse and chorus, and made a very slight change in the melody, resulting in the present popular version. It is one of the most recognized and recorded Western tunes in history.

== Death and legacy ==
Ray Whitley died on February 21, 1979, while en route to a fishing trip to Mexico with his son-in-law, Hal Bracken.

Whitley's original Gibson SJ-200 is on display at the Country Music Hall of Fame in Nashville Tennessee. He was inducted into the Nashville Songwriters Hall of Fame in 1981 and, in 1996, Whitley was inducted into the Western Music Association Hall of Fame.

=== Instruments ===
Whitley also endorsed another Gibson made guitar, sold by the mail order house Montgomery Ward, under the house brand 'Recording King'. This guitar was marketed only in 1939, and featured the signature of Whitley on the headstock. 235 of these were made in mahogany, and 235 in rosewood. One of these instruments was the preferred guitar of American composer John Fahey, who recorded extensively on the instrument from 1969 until the mid-1970s. Fahey destroyed the guitar during a fight with his girlfriend and replaced it with a Martin D-76.

Gibson Shipping Ledgers show the following totals for the Montgomery Ward – Recording King Ray Whitley Jumbo Models:

Total of 147 – RK Ray Whitley Model No. 1027 (Rosewood back & sides, "bat wing" shaped bridge) Total of 170 – RK Ray Whitley Model No. 1028 (Mahogany back & sides, plain rectangle-style bridge)

Breaks down like this: 143 No. 1027s shipped in 1939 Only 4 No. 1027s shipped in 1940

115 No. 1028s were shipped in 1939 55 No. 1028s shipped in 1940

First shipment of 1027s – January 23, 1939 – Last: February 27, 1940, First shipment of 1028s – June 23, 1939 – Last: June 13, 1940

== Filmography ==
=== Feature films, featuring Ray Whitley ===
Film
Year	Title	Role	Notes
1936	King of the Royal Mounted	Singer	Uncredited
1936	Hopalong Cassidy Returns	Davis	
1937	Hittin' the Trail	Guitar Player	
1937	The Mystery of the Hooded Horsemen	Guitar Player	
1937	The Old Wyoming Trail	Singing cowhand	Uncredited
1938	Where the West Begins	Singer / Henchman	Uncredited
1938	Rawhide	Gehrig Party Guitarist	Uncredited
1938	Gun Law	Sam McGee	
1938	Border G-Man	Luke Jones	
1938	Painted Desert	Steve	
1938	The Renegade Ranger	Happy	
1939	Trouble in Sundown	Andy	
1939	Racketeers of the Range	Ray Whitley	
1940	Wagon Train	Ned	
1940	The Fargo Kid	Johnny	
1941	Along the Rio Grande	'Smokey' Ryan	
1941	Robbers of the Range	'Smokey' Ryan	
1941	Cyclone on Horseback	'Smokey' Ryan	
1941	Six-Gun Gold	'Smokey' Ryan	
1941	The Bandit Trail	'Smokey' Ryan	
1941	Dude Cowboy	'Smokey' Ryan	
1942	Riding the Wind	'Smokey' Ryan	
1942	Land of the Open Range	'Smokey' Ryan	
1942	Come on Danger	'Smokey' Ryan	
1942	Thundering Hoofs	'Smokey' Ryan	
1944	Boss of Boomtown	Corporal Clark	
1944	Trigger Trail	Gilroy	
1944	Trail to Gunsight	Barton, Cattle Buyer	
1944	Riders of the Santa Fe	Deputy Hank	
1944	The Old Texas Trail	Amarillo	
1945	Hollywood and Vine	Tex	Uncredited
1945	Beyond the Pecos	Dan Muncie	
1945	Renegades of the Rio Grande	Tex Henry	
1946	West of the Alamo	Keno Wilson	
1949	Gun Law Justice	Ray – Guitar Player	Uncredited
1953	Calamity Jane	Minor Role	Uncredited
1956	Giant	Watts	

=== Short subjects, starring Ray Whitley and His Six Bar Cowboys ===
All produced and released by RKO Radio Pictures

Film
Year	Title
1937	Rhythm Wranglers
1938	A Buckaroo Broadcast
1938	A Western Welcome
1938	Prairie Papas
1939	Ranch House Romeo
1939	Sagebrush Serenade
1939	Cupid Rides the Range
1939	Bandits and Ballads
1940	Molly Cures a Cowboy
1940	Corralling a Schoolmarm
1940	Bar Buckaroos
1941	Prairie Spooners
1941	Red Skins and Red Heads
1941	The Musical Bandit
1941	California or Bust
1942	Keep Shooting
1942	Cactus Capers
1942	Range Rhythm
