= Bandit Ranger =

1942 film

- Theatrical release poster
- Directed by: Lesley Selander
- Written by: Bennett Cohen; Morton Grant
- Produced by: Bert Gilroy
- Starring: Tim Holt
- Cinematography: Nicholas Musuraca
- Edited by: Les Millbrook
- Music by: Paul Sawtell
- Distributed by: RKO Radio Pictures
- Release date: September 25, 1942 (U.S.)
- Running time: 65 minutes
- Country: United States
- Language: English

Bandit Ranger is a 1942 Western film.

It was the first of six Westerns produced starring Tim Holt between 11 May and 17 July 1942 caused by Holt's impending induction into the United States Army Air Forces.

== Cast ==
- Tim Holt as Clay Travers
- Cliff Edwards as Ike (as Cliff 'Ukulele Ike' Edwards)
- Joan Barclay as Sally Mattison
- Kenneth Harlan as Mark Kenyon
- LeRoy Mason as Ed Martin (as Leroy Mason)
- Glenn Strange as Frank Curtis
- Jack Rockwell as Joe - Stage Driver
- Frank Ellis as Henchman
- Bob Kortman as Henchman
- Bud Geary as Henchman
- Dennis Moore as Frank Mattison
- Russell Wade as Tex - Clay's Ranchhand

== External list ==
- Bandit Ranger at IMDb
- Bandit Ranger at the TCM Movie Database (archived)
- Bandit Ranger at the AFI Catalog of Feature Films
