= Cyclone on Horseback =

1941 film by Edward Killy

- Theatrical release poster
- Directed by: Edward Killy
- Written by: Norton S. Parker; Tom Gibson
- Produced by: Bert Gilroy
- Starring: Tim Holt; Marjorie Reynolds; Ray Whitley
- Cinematography: Harry J. Wild
- Edited by: Frederic Knudtson
- Music by: Paul Sawtell
- Production company: RKO Radio Pictures
- Distributed by: RKO Radio Pictures
- Release date: June 13, 1941
- Running time: 60 minutes
- Country: United States
- Language: English

Cyclone on Horseback is a 1941 American western film directed by Edward Killy and starring Tim Holt, Marjorie Reynolds and Ray Whitley. It was produced and distributed by RKO Pictures. Tom Stempel thought the film "features a livelier heroine than is usual in B westerns."

== Plot ==
In the Old West, horse rancher Stan Bradford delivers a herd of pack horses to Valley City. The horses were purchased by Jeff Corbin who won a bid on a contract to lay a telephone line. Upon delivery, Stan is told Jeff's check for payment is no good. A man named Cobb Wayne offers to cover Jeff's check and tells Stan to deliver the horses to him. Mary Corbin, Jeff's sister, promises Stan she will make Jeff's payment good with negotiable bonds she is holding for Jeff. Mary heads to the ranch, but Stan sees her being pursued by Wayne's men to steal Jeff's bonds. Stan gives chase with his buddies, Smokey and Whopper. They run off Wayne's men and Stan escorts Mary to Jeff's work camp. At the camp, Stan breaks up a fight between Jeff and the line workers who are angry because Jeff hasn't paid them. Mary gives Jeff his bonds and Jeff promises to cash the bonds to pay the workers. Jeff says he underbid Wayne for the telephone line job and if he cant complete it, Wayne gets the job. Stan lends Jeff $2,400 to cover his expenses and Jeff gives him negotiable bonds as security. When Stan tries to cash the bonds, Mr. Williams, the local banker, summons the sheriff to arrest Stan because of reports that some stolen bonds are being passed around in the area. Smokey and Whopper are not arrested and go to a local diner. Smokey sings and raises contributions from the other customers to pay for the meal, but they unwittingly short change the owner.

Mary appears at the jail and tells Stan she is waiting on a telegram from her lawyer proving the bonds are not stolen. Mary jokingly says "If anyone stole them, I did." The sheriff then releases Stan and arrests Mary. Stan leaves with Smokey and Whopper to see Jeff and is seen riding out of town. This is reported to Wayne who knows he has to stop Jeff before Jeff re-routes the telephone line in order to make the deadline. Stan returns to the jail with Mr. Williams who substantiates Jeff's bonds are not stolen, exonerating Jeff and Mary. The work camp is ambushed by Wayne's men and Jeff is injured by gunfire. The injury will take him off the job to recuperate. The investors threaten to pull the contract, until Stan reluctantly agrees to stand in for Jeff.

Stan, accompanied by Mary, drives wagon loads of dynamite to the job site. Wayne's men pursue them but retreat after Stan and Mary throw lit dynamite sticks. In turn, Wayne leads his men to dynamite the work project. Wayne then goes to Jeff's work camp, assaults the workers and runs them off. Stan uses a harness and horse team to load the telephone wire to string through the trees. Wayne and his men pursue them and a gunfight ensues. With the help of cover fire, Stan takes the spool of wire off the harness and rolls it downhill, so he can finish stringing it. Wayne's men retreat after an intense gunfight. Wayne tries to thwart Stan from hanging the last connection to complete the wire contract deadline. Stan subdues Wayne, connects the wire and makes the deadline. Wayne goes to jail. Smokey and Whopper are run out of the diner by the owner they previously short changed. Stan joins them as they make their way out of town.

== Cast ==
- Tim Holt as Stan Bradford
- Marjorie Reynolds as Mary Corbin
- Ray Whitley as Smokey
- Lee "Lasses" White as Whopper
- Harry Worth as Cobb Wayne
- Dennis Moore as Jeff Corbin
- Eddie Dew as Pete
- Monte Montague as Randall
- Slim Whitaker as Valley City Sheriff
- Max Wagner as Jamison
- John Dilson as Mr. Williams
- Lew Kelly as Thad Madison

== External list ==
- Cyclone on Horseback at IMDb
