= Gun Law (1938 film) =

1938 film by David Howard

- Directed by: David Howard
- Screenplay by: Oliver Drake
- Produced by: Bert Gilroy
- Starring: George O'Brien
- Cinematography: Joseph August
- Edited by: Frederic Knudtson
- Music by: Roy Webb
- Distributed by: RKO Radio Pictures
- Release date: May 13, 1938
- Running time: 58 minutes
- Country: United States
- Language: English
- Budget: $78,000
- Box office: $195,000

Gun Law is a 1938 western film. It made a profit of $47,000.

== Plot ==
After he finds the wanted outlaw "The Raven" dead from having sipped water from a contaminated stream, U.S. Marshal Tom O'Malley decides to impersonate him and investigate criminal activities in the Arizona town of Gunsight.

Saloon keeper Flash Arnold and a corrupt mayor are engaged in various nefarious deeds. At first they believe O'Malley to be the Raven and even appoint him the town's sheriff. Then they try to frame him after the lawman begins foiling their robbery attempts, but O'Malley prevails.

== Cast ==
- George O'Brien as Tom O'Malley
- Ward Bond as Pecos
- Robert Gleckler as Flash Arnold
- Rita Oehmen as Ruth Ross
- Ray Whitley as Singing Sam McGee
- Paul Everton as John Blaine
- Francis McDonald as Henchman Nevada
- Edward Pawley as The Raven
