= Border G-Man =

1938 film by David Howard

- Theatrical release poster
- Directed by: David Howard
- Screenplay by: Oliver Drake
- Story by: Bernard McConville
- Produced by: Bert Gilroy
- Starring: George O'Brien; Laraine Day; Ray Whitley; John Miljan; Rita La Roy
- Cinematography: Joseph H. August
- Edited by: Frederic Knudtson
- Music by: Roy Webb
- Production company: RKO Pictures
- Distributed by: RKO Pictures
- Release date: June 24, 1938
- Running time: 60 minutes
- Country: United States
- Language: English

Border G-Man is a 1938 American western film directed by David Howard and written by Oliver Drake. The film stars George O'Brien, Laraine Day, Ray Whitley, John Miljan and Rita La Roy. The film was released on June 24, 1938, by RKO Pictures.

== Plot ==
Jim Galloway, posing as a ranch foreman, is sent to investigate a suspicion that ammunition, horses and men are being smuggled out of the country and becomes involved in a mystery and a romance.

== Cast ==
- George O'Brien as Jim Galloway
- Laraine Day as Betty Holden
- Ray Whitley as Luke Jones
- John Miljan as Louis Rankin
- Rita La Roy as Mrs. Rita Browning
- Edgar Dearing as Smoky Joslin
- William Stelling as Leslie Holden
- Edward Keane as Colonel Christie
- Ethan Laidlaw as Henchman Curly
- Hugh Sothern as Matt Rathburn
- Bob Burns as Sheriff Clemens
