= The Rookie Cop =

1939 film

- Theatrical release poster
- Directed by: David Howard
- Written by: Guy K. Austin; Earl Johnson
- Screenplay by: Morton Grant; Jo Pagano
- Produced by: Bert Gilroy
- Starring: Tim Holt; Virginia Weidler; Janet Shaw
- Cinematography: Harry J. Wild
- Edited by: Frederic Knudtson
- Music by: Roy Webb
- Distributed by: RKO Radio Pictures
- Release date: April 28, 1939
- Running time: 60 mins
- Language: English
- Budget: $77,000
- Box office: $162,000

The Rookie Cop is a 1939 crime film directed by David Howard and starring Tim Holt as a rookie cop who wants to prove his friend wasn't involved with a robbery. The film also stars Virginia Weidler, Janet Shaw, Frank M. Thomas, and Muriel Evans.

== Cast ==
- Tim Holt as Clem Maitland
- Virginia Weidler as Nicey
- Janet Shaw as Gerry Lane
- Frank M. Thomas as Police Chief Gordon H. Lane
- Robert Emmett Keane as Commissioner Hugh Thomas
- Monte Montague as Tom Hadley/'Monte' – Henchman
- Don Brodie as Frank 'Frankie' Dixon
- Ralf Harolde as Joey Anderman – Roadhouse Owner
- Muriel Evans as Fern – Joey's Girl
- Ace the Wonder Dog as Ace

== Reception ==
The film made a profit of $18,000.

The Los Angeles Times called it "an unusually agreeable picture".
