= Brothers in the Saddle =

1949 film by Lesley Selander

- Theatrical release poster
- Directed by: Lesley Selander
- Starring: Tim Holt; Steve Brodie; Richard Martin; Virginia Cox; Carol Forman
- Cinematography: J. Roy Hunt
- Edited by: Samuel E. Beetley
- Music by: Paul Sawtell
- Production company: RKO Radio Pictures
- Distributed by: RKO Radio Pictures
- Release date: February 8, 1949 (US)
- Running time: 60 minutes
- Country: United States
- Language: English
- Budget: $157,000
- Box office: $205,000

Brothers in the Saddle is a 1949 American Western film directed by Lesley Selander. Virginia Cox makes her film debut.

== Plot ==
Tim Taylor ia a cowboy who tries to convince and reform his younger brother, Steve, who killed a man in self defence and became outlaw.

== Cast ==
- Tim Holt as Tim Taylor
- Steve Brodie as Steve Taylor
- Richard Martin as Chito Rafferty
- Virginia Cox as Nancy Austin
- Carol Forman

== Reception ==
The film recorded a loss to RKO of $35,000.

== External list ==
- Brothers in the Saddle at IMDb
