= Six-Gun Gold =

1941 film by David Howard

Six Gun Gold
- Directed by: David Howard
- Written by: Tom Gibson
- Screenplay by: Norton S. Parker
- Produced by: Bert Gilroy
- Starring: Tim Holt; Ray Whitley; Jan Clayton
- Cinematography: Harry J. Wild
- Edited by: Frederic Knudtson
- Music by: Paul Sawtell
- Production company: RKO Radio Pictures
- Distributed by: RKO Radio Pictures
- Release date: August 8, 1941 (U.S.)
- Running time: 57 minutes
- Country: United States
- Language: English
- Budget: $49,000
- Box office: $113,000

Six Gun Gold is a 1941 Western film directed by David Howard and starring Tim Holt, Ray Whitley and Jan Clayton. It was produced and distributed by RKO Pictures.

== Plot ==
Don, Smokey and Whopper stop a runaway stagecoach and save passenger Jenny Blanchard on their way to Placerville, where the marshal is Don's brother, Brad.

When he gets to town, Don finds someone impersonating his brother. The law counters by accusing Don and his pals of being horse thieves. Jenny vouches for their integrity with father Ben and sister Penny.

It turns out the stagecoach line owner's assistant is behind a gold-shipment theft and other crimes. Don and local miners get involved, saving the day.

== Cast ==
- Tim Holt as Don Cardigan
- Fern Emmett as Jenny
- Jan Clayton as Penny
- Eddy Waller as Ben
- Ray Whitley as Smokey
- Lee White as Whopper
- LeRoy Mason as Reynolds, fake Brad Cardigan
- Eddy Waller as Ben Blanchard
- Fern Emmett as Jenny Blanchard
- Davison Clark as Robinson
- Harry Harvey as Vander
- Slim Whitaker as Deputy Miller
- Lane Chandler as Brad Cardigan
- Jim Corey as Deputy

== Reception ==
The film made a profit of $22,000. It was also critically well received.

== Bibliography ==
- Fetrow, Alan G. Feature Films, 1940-1949: a United States Filmography. McFarland, 1994.
