= Bert Gilroy =

American film producer

- Born: May 7, 1899; Arizona, United States
- Died: January 16, 1973 (aged 73); San Bernardino, California, United States
- Occupation: Producer
- Years active: 1934–1944

Bert Gilroy (May 7, 1899 – January 16, 1973) was an American film producer of the 1930s and 1940s. Born in Arizona in 1899, he began his Hollywood career behind the scenes on the 1926 silent film Pals in Paradise. In 1934, he began producing by overseeing short films for RKO Radio Pictures with Bandits and Ballads, a musical short. After four years of producing shorts, he would be given a chance at producing a full-length feature at RKO, with the western film, Gun Law. Later that year he would produce Painted Desert, a remake of the 1931 film The Painted Desert for which he was the assistant director, and was memorable as containing the first speaking role for Clark Gable. During the decade he was active, he would produce over 150 short and feature films. His feature films would overwhelmingly consist of westerns, many of which would star RKO's leading western star of the 1930s, Tim Holt. Gilroy spent almost his entire career at RKO studios, after its creation in 1929. His last credited film on which he was an associate producer on in 1946, Hollywood Bound was a compilation of three 1930s Betty Grable RKO short subjects that was released by Astor Pictures.

== Filmography ==
(as per AFI's database)

Year	Title	Role	Notes
1926	Pals in Paradise	Production manager	
1927	Jewels of Desire	Production manager	
1930	Swing High	Assistant Director	
1931	The Painted Desert	Assistant Director	
1932	A Woman Commands	Assistant Director	
1933	Flying Down to Rio	Assistant Director, Unit Manager	
1936	Mary of Scotland	Unit Manager	
1938	The Renegade Ranger	Producer	
1938	Border G-Man	Producer	
1938	Gun Law	Producer	
1938	Painted Desert	Producer	
1938	Lawless Valley	Producer	
1939	The Fighting Gringo	Producer	
1939	The Rookie Cop	Producer	
1939	Arizona Legion	Producer	
1939	Racketeers of the Range	Producer	
1939	The Marshal of Mesa City	Producer	
1939	Timber Stampede	Producer	
1939	Trouble in Sundown	Producer	
1940	Bullet Code	Producer	
1940	The Fargo Kid	Producer	
1940	Pop Always Pays	Producer	
1940	Prairie Law	Producer	
1940	Wagon Train	Producer	
1940	Legion of the Lawless	Producer	
1940	Triple Justice	Producer	
1940	Stage to Chino	Producer	
1941	Along the Rio Grande	Producer	
1941	The Bandit Trail	Producer	
1941	Come on Danger	Producer	
1941	Cyclone on Horseback	Producer	
1941	Dude Cowboy	Producer	
1941	Robbers of the Range	Producer	
1941	Thundering Hoofs	Producer	
1941	Six-Gun Gold	Producer, screenplay	
1942	Army Surgeon	Producer	
1942	Bandit Ranger	Producer	
1942	Land of the Open Range	Producer	
1942	Mexican Spitfire's Elephant	Producer	
1942	Pirates of the Prairie	Producer	
1942	Riding the Wind	Producer	
1942	Red River Robin Hood	Producer	
1943	Fighting Frontier	Producer	
1943	Ladies' Day	Producer	
1943	Mexican Spitfire's Blessed Event	Producer	
1943	Petticoat Larceny	Producer	
1943	Rookies in Burma	Producer	
1943	Sagebrush Law	Producer	
1943	The Avenging Rider	Producer	
1943	The Adventures of a Rookie	Producer	
1946	Hollywood Bound	Associate Producer	
