= The Law West of Tombstone =

1938 film by Glenn Tryon

- Directed by: Glenn Tryon
- Written by: John Twist; Clarence Upson Young
- Produced by: Cliff Reid
- Starring: Harry Carey; Tim Holt
- Cinematography: J. Roy Hunt
- Edited by: George Crone
- Music by: Roy Webb
- Distributed by: RKO Radio Pictures
- Release date: November 18, 1938
- Running time: 72-73 minutes
- Country: United States
- Language: English

The Law West of Tombstone is a 1938 Western film. It was an early Western for Tim Holt.

== Plot ==
A Judge Roy Bean figure dispenses justice in Arizona. He teams up with the Tonto Kid to fight the McQuinn gang.

== Cast ==
- Harry Carey as Bill Barker
- Tim Holt as Ted aka The Tonto Kid
- Evelyn Brent as Clara 'Clary' Martinez
- Jean Rouverol as Nita Mosby
- Clarence Kolb as Sam Kent
- Allan Lane as Danny Sanders
- Esther Muir as Madame Mustache
- Bradley Page as Doc Howard
- Paul Guilfoyle as Bud McQuinn
- Robert Spindola as Joey Chuy (as Robert Moya)
- Ward Bond as Mulligan P. Martinez
- George Irving as Mort Dixon

== Production ==
Tim Holt was borrowed by RKO from Walter Wanger to play the Tonto Kid. He would soon star in a series of Westerns for the studio.

Anne Shirley and Harry Carey were also borrowed from Wanger. However Shirley refused to play the role and was suspended.

Author Tom Stempel called the film " one of the more haphazard movies of the time" in which "Carey plays a combination of Buffalo Bill, Judge Roy Bean, and Pat Garrett, with a young Holt playing a version of Billy the Kid. Holt seems right at home in westerns."
