= Dude Cowboy =

1941 film

- Directed by: David Howard
- Written by: Morton Grant
- Screenplay by: Morton Grant
- Produced by: Bert Gilroy
- Starring: Tim Holt; Marjorie Reynolds; Ray Whitley
- Cinematography: Harry J. Wild
- Edited by: Frederic Knudtson
- Music by: Paul Sawtell
- Production company: RKO Radio Pictures
- Distributed by: RKO Radio Pictures
- Release date: December 12, 1941 (U.S.)
- Running time: 59 minutes
- Country: United States
- Language: English

Dude Cowboy is a 1941 American western film. David Howard directed the film (his final one) and Morton Grant wrote the screenplay. The film stars Tim Holt as Terry McVey, Eddie Kane as Gordon West, Marjorie Reynolds as Barbara Adams (alias Bernice Allen), Byron Foulger as Frank Adams, Louise Currie as Gail Sargent, Eddie Dew as French, Helen Holmes as Aunt Althea Carter, Lloyd Ingraham as Pop Stebbins, Eddie Kane as Gordon West, and Tom London as the Silver City Sheriff.

Filming began 25 April 1941.

== Plot summary ==
In the Old West, cowhand, Terry McVey, is hired by the United States Secret Service to go undercover in Silver City, Nevada and investigate a counterfeiting ring after the disappearance of Frank Adams, a noted engraver. Adams is being held at the Silver Bar Ranch by counterfeiter Gordon West and his gang. The ranch includes a casino and hotel through which West launders his fake money. Terry arrives by train along with Adams' daughter, Barbara, who poses as "Bernice Allen." Terry and Barbara are attracted to each other. Also in Silver City are two of Terry's pals, Smokey and Whopper, who are working a medicine show.

The sheriff arrests Terry, Smokey and Whopper for disturbing the peace after a fight breaks out. The three are released but the medicine show inventory is auctioned to Pop Stebbins. Meanwhile, Barbara, posing as Bernice, arrives at the Silver Bar Ranch stating she wants to board there for a few days. Terry and his pals are hired to work at the ranch. West plans to kill Adams after his work is completed.

Terry and Barbara become suspicious of French, one of West's men, and follow him to the Silver Queen mine, a hideout where Adams is printing the counterfeit money. Terry's cover is blown and he is chased by West's gang. French discovers Barbara and takes her hostage. Terry eludes his pursuers and heads back to the ranch. Terry informs Smokey and Whopper about the counterfeiting at the mine. French discovers Barbara's true identity and also Terry's involvement. Terry, Smokey and Whopper are held prisoner by West's gang. The gang abandons the three, taking the horses and cutting the phone lines. However, Pop Stebbins arrives with the medicine show wagon which the boys use to transport themselves to the Silver Queen mine. Terry and his pals breach the mine and a gunfight ensues. Adams attempts to destroy the engraving plates but is knocked down by West. Pop Stebbins summons the sheriff to bring a posse. West orders a stampede of the horses to facilitate his escape but Terry jumps on West and French as they ride out, subduing both. Outside the mine, the sheriff and his posse have arrived and arrest West and his gang.

With the ranch now in the hands of Aunt Althea Carter, Terry bids farewell to Barbara, promising to return. Whopper tells Terry that Althea hired him as ranch foreman and he plans to stay. However, when a preacher arrives, Whopper chases Terry's wagon to avoid marrying Althea.

== Cast ==
- Tim Holt as Terry McVey
- Marjorie Reynolds as Barbara Adams (alias Bernice Allen)
- Ray Whitley as Smokey
- Lee 'Lasses' White as Prof. Whopper Hatch
- Louise Currie as Gail Sargent
- Helen Holmes as Aunt Althea Carter
- Eddie Kane as Gordon West
- Eddie Dew as French
- Byron Foulger as Frank Adams
- Tom London as Silver City Sheriff
- Lloyd Ingraham as Pop Stebbins
- Glenn Strange as Henchman Krinkle
