= Love's Redemption =

1921 film

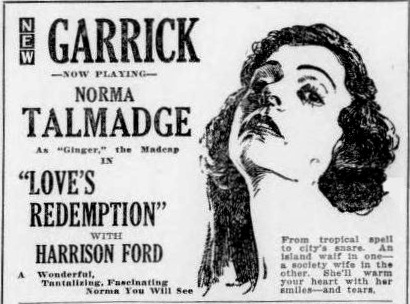
- Advertisement
- Directed by: Albert Parker
- Written by: Anthony Paul Kelly
- Based on: "On Principle" by Andrew Soutar
- Starring: Norma Talmadge; Harrison Ford; Montagu Love
- Cinematography: J. Roy Hunt
- Production company: Norma Talmadge Film Corporation
- Distributed by: Associated First National Pictures
- Release date: December 19, 1921
- Running time: 6 reels
- Country: United States
- Language: Silent (English intertitles)

Love's Redemption is a 1921 American silent adventure drama film directed by Albert Parker and starring Norma Talmadge, Harrison Ford, and Montagu Love. The film is presumed to be lost.

== Plot ==
As described in a film magazine, Ginger, a young Jamaican woman, secures a position as a housekeeper for Englishman Clifford Standish, a wealthy plantation owner, when Captain Bill Hennessey, with whom she had lived for several years, sails away for England. Clifford struggles as he is addicted to drink. Ginger saves Clifford from being robbed by some locals, and then by reforming him she induces him to give up drink and take an interest in running the plantation. Clifford falls in love with her and, on the day they are married, his brother John arrives from England. He brings news that Clifford has inherited a vast estate. They return to England where his mother and former sweetheart meet Ginger with carefully rehearsed hauteur. During a card game Ginger discovers one player is cheating with marked cards and the Englishman is exposed. Cliff and his bride Ginger return to the West Indies to get away from the pretense and hypocrisy of the society she had been thrust into.

== Cast ==
- Norma Talmadge as Jennie Dobson (aka Ginger)
- Harrison Ford as Clifford Standish
- Montagu Love as Frederick Kent
- H. Cooper Cliffe as John Standish
- Ida Waterman as Mrs. Standish
- Michael M. Barnes as Captain Bill Hennessey
- E.L. Fernandez as Overseer
- Frazer Coulter as Club Steward

== Production ==
The film's working title was Regeneration Isle.
