= Storm over Wyoming =

1950 film by Lesley Selander

- Directed by: Lesley Selander
- Starring: Tim Holt; Richard Martin
- Distributed by: RKO Radio Pictures
- Release date: April 22, 1950 (US)
- Running time: 61 minutes
- Country: United States
- Language: English

Storm over Wyoming is a 1950 Western film directed by Lesley Selander and starring Tim Holt and Richard Martin.

== Plot ==
In the Old West, a range war develops between cattlemen and sheepmen. Cattle rancher Robert Dawson hires a couple of cowhands, Dave Saunders and Chito Rafferty, who find themselves caught in the middle when they see what appears to be a sheep rustling on Dawson’s ranch. The rustler was sent by Rawlins, the foreman for sheep rancher Chris Marvin, to frame Dawson in order to steal Marvin’s herd for himself. Dave and Chito capture the rustler, but Rawlins kills him, accuses Dave and Chito of murder and wants them lynched. Chris, however, wants them tried and holds them for the sheriff.

Saloon singer Ruby (and Chito’s girlfriend), slips a gun to Dave and Chito in Chito’s guitar, and the pair escape. They visit the local undertaker who shows them the bullet that killed the rustler came from a rifle, which neither Dave or Chito owns. The cowhands prove their innocence to Chris and the three pursue Rawlins who has also killed the undertaker. Ultimately, a gunfight ensues ending in Rawlins' arrest. Dave and Chris form a bond. But when Chito's girlfriend, Ruby, begins feeling romantic, Chito has other ideas and runs away with Ruby in pursuit.

== Cast ==
- Tim Holt as Dave Saunders
- Richard Martin as Chito Rafferty
- Noreen Nash as Chris Marvin
- Bill Kennedy as Rawlins
- Richard Powers as Tug
- Betty Underwood as Ruby
- Kenneth MacDonald as Robert Dawson

== Production ==
Storm over Wyoming was the only Tim Holt Western shot in Agoura. This was required because the plot involved sheep.
