= Rio Grande Patrol =

1950 film by Lesley Selander

- Directed by: Lesley Selander
- Starring: Tim Holt; Tom Tyler
- Distributed by: RKO Radio Pictures
- Release date: 1950
- Country: United States
- Language: English

Rio Grande Patrol is a 1950 Western film directed by Lesley Selander and starring Tim Holt and Tom Tyler.

== Plot ==
In the Old West, Laredo saloon owner, Fowler, is smuggling guns across the U.S. - Mexican border with the assistance of outlaw, Bragg Orcutt, by hiding them inside the costume trunks of his dance-hall girls. Border agents Kansas Jones, and his pal, Chito Rafferty, accompany Captain Trevino to the train station to investigate. Bragg shoots Captain Trevino as the girls arrive at the station. Kansas and Chito chase Bragg who is intercepted by his gang and gets away. Fowler breaks the news of Trevino's death to Sherry Bliss, one of his dance hall girls who is engaged to Trevino. Kansas and Chito discover, however, that Trevino survived the shooting and is recuperating at the doctor's office. Kansas and Chito head to Fowler's saloon to search the place. Sherry tells Kansas that Trevino believed Fowler and Bragg were in cahoots. Kansas tells Sherry that Trevino is alive. Fowler arrives and tells Kansas and Chito to leave as they have no search warrant. Chito and a dance hall girl named Peppie are attracted to each other.

Fowler heads to Bragg's hideout and tells him Trevino is not dead and he can't move the guns because he is under suspicion. He urges Bragg to take care of Kansas and Chito, but Bragg is reluctant to go back into town because he can be identified. The pair hire Bragg's henchman, Chet Yance, to kill the border agents and instruct him to be at Fowler's saloon that evening. A gunfight ensues at the saloon. Kansas wounds Yance who rides away. Kansas and Chito now put the saloon under constant surveillance. Fowler closes the saloon and tells the girls he is moving his business, and them, to Monterrey, Mexico. Sherry tells Fowler she intends to marry Trevino and is leaving his employment as soon as they arrive in Monterrey.

Kansas and Chito confront Fowler on his way to the border. Kansas escorts him while Chito watches the saloon. At the border, and outside his jurisdiction, Kansas withdraws. Bragg and Yance capture Kansas and take him to Bragg's hideout. Kansas' horse, Lightning, escapes and heads back to town putting Chito and a recovered Trevino on notice. Against medical advice, Trevino, accompanied by Chito, with Lightning in tow, heads for Bragg's. As the pair near the hideout, Chito baits Yance to come out, knocks him down, and rescues Kansas, who then shoots and kills Yance as he rides off.

In town, Kansas and Chito see Bragg and his gang loading a wagon with crates at Fowler's saloon. A gunfight ensues. Kansas and Chito overcome the gang and subdue Bragg just as Trevino arrives to make the arrest. Sherry and Trevino are married. Peppie catches the bridal bouquet causing Chito to hurriedly ride away. Kansas bids farewell to join Chito and escort Bragg to trial.

== Cast ==
- Tim Holt as Kansas Jones
- Richard Martin as Chito Rafferty
- Jane Nigh as Sherry Bliss
- Tom Tyler as Chet Yance
- Douglas Fowley as Bragg Orcutt
- Rick Vallin as Captain Alberto Trevino
- John Holland as Fowler
- Cleo Moore as Peppie
- Larry Johns as Dr. A.M. Reynolds
- Harry Harvey Sr. as Station Master

== Production ==
Cleo Moore did 16 hours of dancing during filming, causing her to come down with bruises on her feet. Doctors ordered her to rest for five days.

== Error ==
The town setting, Laredo, Texas, is erroneously identified as "Laredo, Arizona" in an establishing shot near the beginning of the film.
