= Masked Raiders =

1949 film by Lesley Selander

- Theatrical poster of 1949 film
- Directed by: Lesley Selander
- Written by: Norman Houston
- Produced by: Herman Schlom
- Starring: Tim Holt; Marjorie Lord
- Cinematography: George E. Diskant
- Edited by: Les Millbrook
- Music by: Paul Sawtell
- Distributed by: RKO Radio Pictures
- Release date: October 15, 1949 (US)
- Running time: 59-60 mins
- Country: United States
- Language: English

Masked Raiders is a 1949 American Western film starring Tim Holt.

It was originally called Trouble in Texas. Filming started 25 April 1949.

== Cast ==
- Tim Holt as Tim
- Marjorie Lord as Gale Trevett
- Richard Martin as Chito
- Houseley Stevenson as Uncle Henry
- Clayton Moore as Matt
- Frank Wilcox as Corthell
- Gary Gray as Artie
