= The Mysterious Desperado =

1949 film by Lesley Selander

- Directed by: Lesley Selander
- Starring: Tim Holt
- Distributed by: RKO Radio Pictures
- Release date: September 10, 1949 (US)
- Country: United States
- Language: English

The Mysterious Desperado is a 1949 American Western film. The Los Angeles Times reported that "Tim Holt Westerns have attained a good standard which is adequately maintained" in the film.

== Plot ==
Tim Holt and his partner, Chito Rafferty, investigate when Rafferty's uncle is killed and his son disappears, leaving Rafferty the possible heir to the estate.

== Cast ==
- Tim Holt as himself
- Richard Martin as Chito Rafferty
- Movita Castaneda as Luisa
- Edward Norris as Ramon
