= The Avenging Rider =

1943 film by Sam Nelson

- Directed by: Sam Nelson
- Based on: story The Five of Spades by Harry O. Hoyt
- Produced by: Bert Gilroy
- Starring: Tim Holt, Cliff Edwards,
- Distributed by: RKO Radio Pictures
- Release date: May 20, 1943 (U.S.)
- Country: United States
- Language: English

The Avenging Rider is a 1943 American Western film directed by Sam Nelson and starring Tim Holt.

The story was bought in December 1941 as a vehicle for Holt.

== Plot ==
A cowboy tries to clear himself of murder.

== Cast ==
- Tim Holt as Brit Marshal
- Cliff Edwards as Ike (as Cliff "Ukulele Ike" Edwards)
- Ann Summers as Jean McClane
- Davison Clark as W.J. Grayson (as Davison Clarke)
- Norman Willis as Red
- Karl Hackett as Sheriff Allen
- Earle Hodgins as Deputy (as Earl Hodgins)
- Edward Cassidy as Sheriff Lewis
- Kenne Duncan as Blackie (as Kenneth Duncan)
- Bud McTaggart as Baxter

== External list ==
- The Avenging Rider at IMDb
