= Indian Agent (film) =

1948 film by Lesley Selander

- Directed by: Lesley Selander
- Written by: Norman Houston
- Produced by: Herman Schlom
- Starring: Tim Holt; Noah Beery Jr.
- Distributed by: RKO Radio Pictures
- Release date: December 11, 1948 (U.S.)
- Running time: 64 minutes
- Country: United States
- Language: English

Indian Agent is a 1948 Western film starring Tim Holt.

== Plot ==
A cowboy tries to convince Indians not to go on the warpath due to the activities of a corrupt Indian agent.

== Background ==
The film was finished in May 1948. It was released in December 1948 on a double bill with He Walked By Night.

== Significance ==
The so-called A Westerns are often credited with the major break throughs in movie making culture. So we often overlook the significance of the so-called B Westerns. A good example. Any Western Movie fan knows that the July 1950 released A Western Broken Arrow (1950 film) pioneered early attempts to bring a more positive pro-aboriginal or pro-indigenous perspective to the USA's early peoples. However, with this earlier movie filmed in May 1948, Writer Norman Houston, Producer Herman Schlom, and the All-Time Movie Volume Western Movie Director Lesley Selander, advanced "the goal posts" even closer to that date in July 1950 with this December 1948 released B Western movie which portrayed the USA's earliest people in a more positive light.

== External list ==
- Indian Agent at IMDb
- Review of film at Variety
