= Rustlers (1949 film) =

1949 film

- Directed by: Lesley Selander
- Written by: Jack Natteford; Luci Ward
- Produced by: Herman Schlom
- Starring: Tim Holt
- Cinematography: J. Roy Hunt
- Edited by: Frank Doyle
- Music by: Paul Sawtell
- Distributed by: RKO Radio Pictures
- Release date: 14 May 1949 (US)
- Running time: 61 minutes
- Country: United States
- Language: English

Rustlers is a 1949 American Western directed by Lesley Selander. The film is a Tim Holt B Western about a group of Arizona ranchers intent on stopping a gang of cattle rustlers.

== Plot ==
In the Old West out-of-work cowhands Dick McBride and Chito Rafferty arrive in the town of Trail Cross, Arizona and are confronted by Wheeler, a rustler. Wheeler objects to the attention that saloon singer Trixie Fontaine pays to Chito, her wandering beau, and picks a fight with him. Saloon owner Brad Carew, who is part of Wheeler's Salt River gang, breaks up the ensuing brawl, then orders Wheeler to go to the Bar One ranch. There, as rancher Frank Abbott discusses with his neighbors the gang's recent cattle thefts, Wheeler delivers a ransom note written by Carew. The gang demands $2,000 for the return of Frank's stolen cattle, but the beleaguered rancher refuses to pay and declares his intention to sell the Bar One. Frank's feisty daughter Ruth, however, is determined to thwart the gang and suggests that they can identify the rustlers by paying the ransom with marked money. Agreeing to Ruth's plan, the ranchers pool their cash, which Ruth then marks by cutting off the corners of the bills. Dick and Chito, meanwhile, ride toward the Bar One, having seen a "help wanted" notice for the ranch. Along the way, the cowboys are shot at by Ruth, who assumes they are rustlers. Dick soon disarms Ruth and, after spanking her, playfully chastises her for being unfeminine. Riding down the road, Dick and Chito meet Frank, who tells them that he is probably selling the ranch and therefore is not hiring. Frank then delivers the ransom to a masked Wheeler, who refuses to reveal the cattle's whereabouts until later. While Wheeler hands the marked money over to Carew, Chito goes to the saloon to say goodbye to Trixie. During his farewells, Chito accidentally drops a coin on a roulette wheel number and inadvertently wins a bet. Feeling lucky, he plays the number again and wins $6,000. When Chito and Dick go to Carew's office to collect, however, Carew pulls a gun on them. Dick disarms Carew, and while he holds the saloon keeper at gunpoint, Chito removes $6,000 from the office safe. The cowboys then escape with their winnings and ride to the Bar One. There Frank agrees to sell Dick and Chito one quarter of his ranch for $5,000, but when he and Ruth see the marked ransom money in Dick's cash, they immediately draw their guns. Frank and Ruth turn Dick and Chito over to Sheriff Harmon and demand that Carew, who has accused the cowboys of stealing his money, be arrested as well. The sheriff, who is the gang's silent leader, then tells Carew to leave town and reveals his intention to kill Dick and Chito during a staged jailbreak. Before Harmon can execute his plan, however, Trixie slips Dick and Chito a cake with a gun planted inside. After Dick and Chito escape, they catch Carew outside of town and force him to go to the Bar One. There they extract a confession out of Carew and are about to learn the name of the gang's leader when Wheeler shoots the saloon keeper through a window. After Wheeler eludes the pursuing Dick and rides to town, Trixie tells Dick that Wheeler and Harmon are in Carew's office. Deducing that Harmon is the gang's leader, Dick confronts the two men at gunpoint. Soon Dick is involved in a gunfight with the gang, who trap him in a stable and set the building on fire. While Dick tries to shoot his way out, Trixie rides to the Bar One to tell Frank and Ruth, who are holding Chito, about the sheriff. Finally convinced of the cowboys' innocence, Frank releases Chito and helps rescue Dick, who then lassos the fleeing sheriff. Later, an apologetic Ruth, adorned in a frilly dress, begs Dick to stay, and he happily reveals that he and Chito have bought a share of the Bar One. Hearing the news, Trixie then suggests to Chito that they "get hitched," but the confirmed ladies' man takes off on his horse in a panic.

== Cast ==
- Tim Holt as Dick McBride
- Richard Martin as Chito Rafferty
- Martha Hyer as Ruth Abbott
- Steve Brodie as Mort Wheeler
- Lois Andrews as Trixie Fontaine
- Harry Shannon as Sheriff Harmon
- Addison Richards as Frank Abbott
- Frank Fenton as Brad Carew
- Robert Bray as Henchman Hank
- Don Haggerty as Rancher
- Monte Montague as Rancher
- Stanley Blystone as Rancher
