= Harry J. Wild =

American cinematographer (1901–1961)

Harry J. Wild, A.S.C.
- Born: July 5, 1901; New York, New York, U.S.
- Died: February 24, 1961 (aged 59); Los Angeles, California, U.S.
- Occupation: Cinematographer

Harry J. Wild, A.S.C. (July 5, 1901 – February 24, 1961) was a film and television cinematographer. Wild worked at RKO Pictures studios from 1931 through the 1950s. In total Wild was involved in 91 major film projects and two extended television series.

In 1931, he began his career and was hired as second cameraman and operator on nine projects, most notably Fred Niblo's Young Donovan's Kid (1931). In 1936, Wild shot his first feature, Wallace Fox's sports drama The Big Game. Two years later he shared an Academy Award nomination for the Republic Pictures film Army Girl (1938).

According to film critic Spencer Selby, Wild was a prolific film noir cinematographer, shooting 13 of them, including: Dmytryk's Murder, My Sweet (1944), Johnny Angel (1945), Nocturne (1946), the Jean Renoir-directed The Woman on the Beach (1947), They Won't Believe Me (1947), and others. He was also, in the early 1950s, Jane Russell's cinematographer; he worked on seven of her movies as an actress, three of which were released by other studios: His Kind of Woman (1951) and Son of Paleface (1952) for Paramount, and, his most widely seen movie, Gentlemen Prefer Blondes (1953) for Twentieth Century-Fox.

== Filmography ==
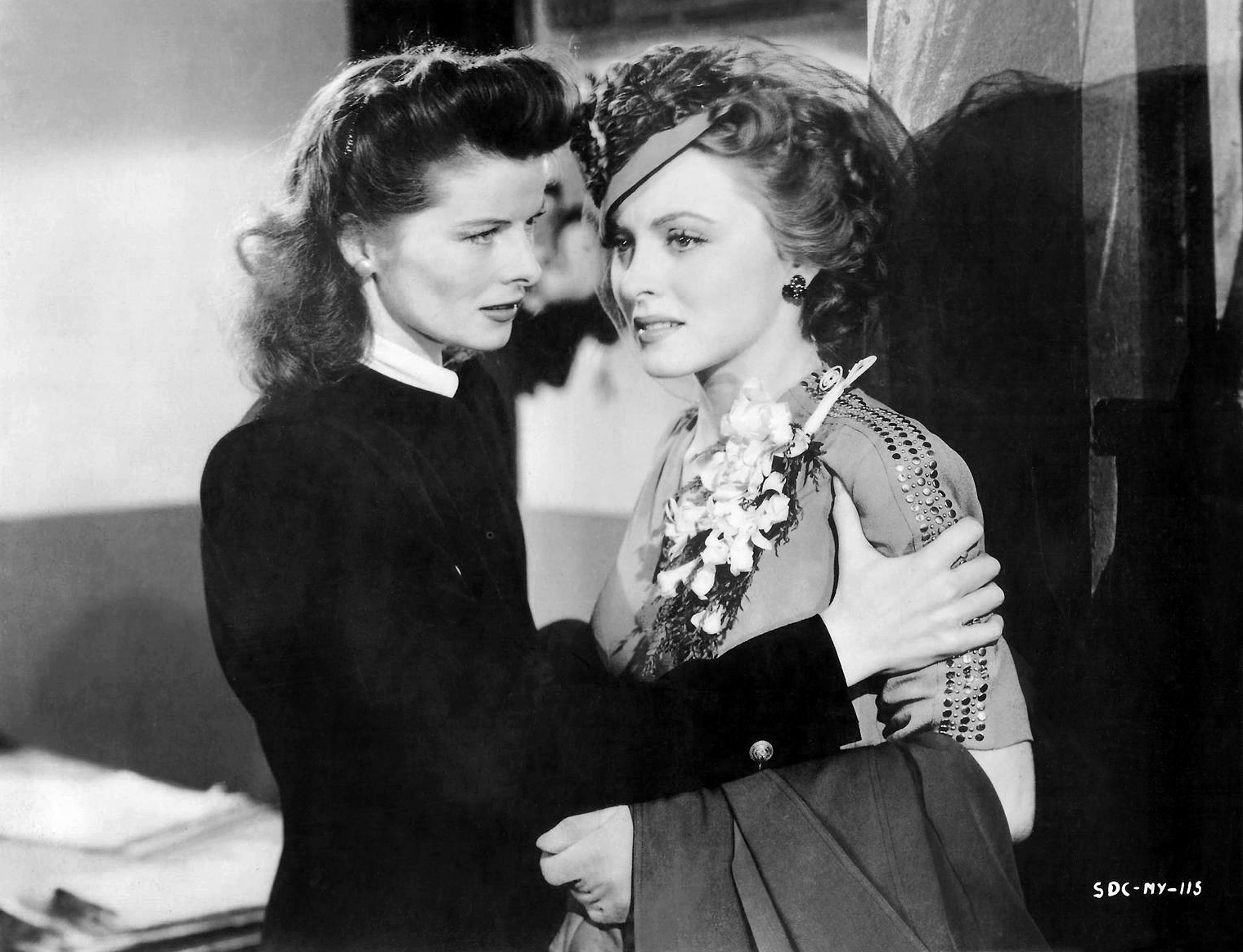
Promotional still of Katharine Hepburn (left) & Cheryl Walker in Stage Door Canteen

- The Big Game (1936)
- Racing Lady (1937)
- Don't Tell the Wife (1937)
- Portia on Trial (1937)
- Lady Behave! (1938)
- Painted Desert (1938)
- Army Girl (1938)
- Lawless Valley (1938)
- The Renegade Ranger (1938)
- Arizona Legion (1939)
- The Rookie Cop (1939)
- Racketeers of the Range (1939)
- Timber Stampede (1939)
- The Fighting Gringo (1939)
- The Marshal of Mesa City (1939)
- Trouble in Sundown (1939)
- The Fargo Kid (1940)
- Bullet Code (1940)
- Millionaires in Prison (1940)
- Laddie (1940)
- Legion of the Lawless (1940)
- Prairie Law (1940)
- Wagon Train (1940)
- The Saint in Palm Springs (1941)
- Cyclone on Horseback (1941)
- Robbers of the Range (1941)
- Citizen Kane (1941, additional photography; uncredited)
- The Bandit Trail (1941)
- Dude Cowboy (1941)
- Valley of the Sun (1942)
- Riding the Wind (1942)
- Land of the Open Range (1942)
- Come on Danger (1942)
- The Magnificent Ambersons (1942, additional photography; uncredited)
- Six Gun Gold (1942)
- It's All True (1942)
- Rookies in Burma (1943)
- So This Is Washington (1943)
- Tarzan Triumphs (1943)
- Stage Door Canteen (1943)
- Tarzan's Desert Mystery (1943)
- Nevada (1944)
- Mademoiselle Fifi (1944)
- Murder, My Sweet (1944)
- The Falcon Out West (1944)
- Radio Stars on Parade (1945)
- Cornered (1945)
- Johnny Angel (1945)
- West of the Pecos (1945)
- Wanderer of the Wasteland (1945)
- First Yank Into Tokyo (1945)
- The Woman on the Beach (1946)
- Till the End of Time (1946)
- Nocturne (1946)
- The Falcon's Adventure (1946)
- They Won't Believe Me (1947)
- Tycoon (1947)
- Pitfall (1948)
- Station West (1948)
- Strange Bargain (1949)
- The Big Steal (1949)
- Easy Living (1949)
- The Threat (1949)
- Walk Softly, Stranger (1950)
- Gambling House (1951)
- His Kind of Woman (1951)
- Two Tickets to Broadway (1951)
- My Forbidden Past (1951)
- The Las Vegas Story (1952)
- Macao (1952)
- Son of Paleface (1952)
- The French Line (1953)
- Gentlemen Prefer Blondes (1953)
- Affair with a Stranger (1953)
- She Couldn't Say No (1954)
- Top of World (1955)
- Underwater! (1955)

== Television ==
- The Bob Cummings Show (1955–1958)
- Law of the Plainsman (1959)
- Wanted: Dead or Alive (1959–1960)
- The Twilight Zone (1960 ("Third from the Sun" episode)

== Accolades ==
- Nomination, Academy Awards: Best Cinematography for Army Girl (1938)
