= Sagebrush Law =

1943 film by Sam Nelson

- Directed by: Sam Nelson
- Screenplay by: Bennett Cohen; Morton Grant
- Produced by: Bert Gilroy
- Starring: Tim Holt; Cliff Edwards; Joan Barclay
- Cinematography: Mack Stengler
- Edited by: John Lockert
- Music by: Paul Sawtell
- Production company: RKO Pictures
- Distributed by: RKO Pictures
- Release date: April 2, 1943 (U.S.)
- Running time: 55 minutes
- Country: United States
- Language: English

Sagebrush Law is a 1943 American Western film directed by Sam Nelson and starring Tim Holt (The Magnificent Ambersons, The Treasure of the Sierra Madre) and Cliff Edwards (perhaps best known as the original voice of Disney's Jiminy Cricket).

It is one of Holt's least regarded Westerns although the fight scene on top of the stage coach is highly regarded. It was one of six films Holt made in two months before going into the United States Army Air Forces as a B-29 bombardier during World War II.

== Plot summary ==
Cowboy Tom Weston and his friend Ike ride anonymously into town. Upon arrival, they discover that Weston's father, the town's banker, is dead. The bank's surviving partner, Mark Carter, and a purported bank examiner named Landers have convinced the townspeople the death was a suicide. Carter and Landers also claim that Weston's father had embezzled most of the town's money from the now insolvent bank.

A suspicious Weston, aware that his left-handed father was found with a gun in his right hand, begins investigating. Carter reveals Weston's true identity prompting angry townspeople to chase Weston and Ike out of town. During their escape Weston and Ike discover a gunshot victim on the outskirts of town. Weston and Ike learn that wounded man is the real bank examiner, bolstering their suspicions of foul play. The pair return to town in a race to identify the murderer(s) before they can escape from justice with the town's money.

== Cast ==
- Tim Holt as Tom Weston
- Cliff Edwards as Ike (as Cliff 'Ukulele Ike' Edwards)
- Joan Barclay as Sally Winters
- John Elliott as Cole Winters (as John H. Elliott)
- Roy Barcroft as Mark Carter
- Ernie Adams as Landers
- Ed Cassidy as Sheriff (as Edward Cassidy)
- John Merton as Burl Mason - Henchman
- Malcolm 'Bud' McTaggart as Foley - Henchman (as Bud McTaggart)
- Karl Hackett as Roberts
- Edmund Cobb as Bill Lanning
- Otto Hoffman as Doc Crandall

== External list ==
- Sagebrush Law at IMDb
- Sagebrush Law at the TCM Movie Database (archived version)
- Sagebrush Law at the AFI Catalog of Feature Films
