= The Bamboo Blonde =

1946 film by Anthony Mann

- Theatrical release poster
- Directed by: Anthony Mann
- Screenplay by: Olive Cooper; Lawrence Kimble
- Based on: "Chicago Lulu" short story The Saturday Evening Post (April 15, 1944) by Wayne Whittaker
- Produced by: Herman Schlom
- Starring: Frances Langford; Ralph Edwards; Russell Wade
- Cinematography: Frank Redman
- Edited by: Les Millbrook
- Music by: Constantin Bakaleinikoff
- Production company: RKO Pictures
- Distributed by: RKO Pictures
- Release date: July 15, 1946
- Running time: 67 minutes
- Country: United States
- Language: English

The Bamboo Blonde is a 1946 American romantic comedy directed by Anthony Mann based on an original story "Chicago Lulu" by Wayne Whittaker. A low budget production, it stars singer Frances Langford in the title role, Ralph Edwards – from TV's This Is Your Life – and Russell Wade, usually a bit player. As an RKO star, Langford was famous for her role in entertaining the troops in World War II, and the film features a number of songs that her character sings at a nightclub and war bond rallies across the nation.

== Plot ==
A reporter is interviewing businessman Eddie Clark on the backstory behind his conglomerate of companies branded the alluring "Bamboo Blonde". During World War II, young Captain Patrick Ransom, Jr., an experienced private recreational pilot, has just been commissioned and given command of a B-29, bomber. Seeking to meet up with his veteran aircrew for the first time before shipping out together the next morning to the Pacific, he is first ditched by the unimpressed and wily bunch, which misdirects him to a declasse New York nightclub, then snubbed by his elitist fiancée, socialite Eileen Sawyer, who refuses to accompany him there.

Determined to meet up with his new aircrew, he persists on his own, only to cluelessly end up at a nightspot owned by Clark that is out-of-bounds to military personnel. Before he realizes this, or is apprehended by M.P.s, Ransom sees beautiful blonde singer Louise Anderson. Overwhelmed, he impetuously falls in love her. When he later passionately kisses the curvy torch singer goodbye his crew mistakenly imagines he's a playboy and dubs him the Air Corps' greatest wolf.

Out in the Pacific, Ransom's plane and crew run into a prolonged stretch of bad luck. Trying to shake it, one of them paints a risque image of the singer on the nose of their bomber. At first, both embarrassed and put off, Captain Ransom relents and allows what becomes dubbed "the Bamboo Blonde" to stay. The plane and crew go on to become famous, without Ransom ever letting on that the blonde bombshell is not "his girl". Seeking to capitalize on their fame, the Air Corps decides to bring the "Bamboo Blonde" and its crew back home to front a national war bond drive. Clark immediately dreams up ways to exploit his singer's connection to the famous bomber.

While all of America assumes the couple has been reunited stateside, things are actually pretty touch-and-go with the couple, as each is coming from a different place and struggling to find their way. Their magnetic attraction to one-another merely complicates things at every turn.

With the pair finally back in New York for a big finale, Eileen schemes a way to break them up, under the guise of throwing a $100,000 a ticket bond rally gala. Only then does Louise discover that rather than being the shy "farmboy" he had presented himself as being (while seeking to downplay to both her and his crew that he was instead a scion to a substantial Pennsylvania fortune) he is of the same social set as Eileen. Convinced her romance with Ransom is just a lark on his part, and determined to ruin any possibility of a match together, she gives her full vampy nightclub performance to the stuffy old money crowd. In spite of a surprisingly enthusiastic reception – certainly by the men in the crowd, young and old alike – she flees to the airport to put as many miles as she can between her and her nonplussed beau.

When all commercial flights are grounded due to fog, she relents when Ransom offers to fly her instead. Deceiving her, he lands on the grounds of the family estate, where Louise is warmly embraced by Ransom's open-armed parents. After some humbling miscues on Ransom's part, the lovebirds' future together is finally assured.

== Cast ==
- Frances Langford as Louise Anderson
- Ralph Edwards as Eddie Clark
- Russell Wade as Patrick Ransom, Jr.
- Iris Adrian as Montana Jones
- Richard Martin as Jim Wilson
- Jane Greer as Eileen Sawyer
- Glen Vernon as Shorty Parker
- Paul Harvey as Patrick Ransom, Sr.
- Regina Wallace as Mrs. Julie Ransom
- Jean Brooks as Marsha
- Tom Noonan as Art Department
- Dorothy Vaughan as Mom
- Jason Robards, Sr. as American officer

== Background ==
In May 1943, RKO originally advertised that a countrywide series of contests would be used to find an "unknown" to portray The Bamboo Blonde in a future romantic comedy feature. Anthony Mann, on his 11th film as a director, is better known for later working with James Stewart on many films (primarily Westerns), as well as for making epics in his later career. This early film is typical of a period when Mann accepted any and all assignments in a variety of genres.

== Songs ==
Songs in the film were all written by Mort Greene and Lew Pollack, and sung by Frances Langford.

- "I'm Good for Nothing but Love"
- "Dreaming out Loud"
- "Moonlight over the Islands", Langford with chorus
- "Right Along about Evening"
- "Right Along about Evening" (reprise), Langford with Paul Harvey, Ralph Edwards, Iris Adrian and Regina Wallace

== Legacy ==
Scenes from The Bamboo Blonde later appeared in an excerpted form in Make Mine Laughs (1949), starring Joan Davis, Dennis Day and Ray Bolger. The new picture was a filmed variety show, using old material from RKO and some new scenes.

Mainly due to its connection with Mann, The Bamboo Blonde was screened at the "B Musicals Film Festival" in 2011 at Film Forum in Manhattan, New York City.
