= Kate Harrington =

American actress

- Born: December 8, 1902; Boise, Idaho, U.S.
- Died: November 23, 1978 (aged 75); New York City, New York, U.S.
- Occupations: Television, film actress
- Years active: 1941–1977

Kate Harrington (December 8, 1902 – November 23, 1978) was an American television and movie actress.

== Career ==
Born and raised in Boise, Idaho, Harrington studied dramatics at the Bush Conservatory in Chicago. Three years later she was given her first professional engagement; the lead in a J.C. Nugent Company production of Kempy.

Harrington spent twelve years in Hollywood, during which time she made numerous movies including Rhapsody in Blue, the Scattergood Baines comedy series starring Guy Kibbee, as well as a number of Tim Holt westerns.

Harrington made her Broadway debut in 1943's Slightly Married, in which she co-starred Leon Ames. Later Broadway appearances included Buy Me Blue Ribbons in 1951, The Happiest Millionaire from 1956 to 1957, playing opposite Walter Pidgeon in the role of Emma, which she originated (Harrington was also in the cast of the show's national tour) and Minor Miracle in 1965. Other off-Broadway roles included Buy Me Blue Ribbons, Morning's at Seven, The Plough and the Stars, The Days and Nights of Beebee Fenstermaker, Not a Way of Life and Stephen D, a play adapted from James Joyce's novel A Portrait of the Artist as a Young Man.

Occasional film roles included those in Madigan and Rachel, Rachel in 1968, Love Story in 1970, The Hospital in 1971, Child's Play in 1972 and The Sentinel in 1977.

Beginning in 1956, Harrington made sporadic television appearances, including NBC Experiment in Television and Great Performances. On daytime television, Harrington was the second actress to play Katherine 'Kate' Martin on All My Children, a role she played from early February until August 1970. Then Harrington moved on to the role of Marion Conway (#2) on Guiding Light from 1971 to 1972.

== Personal life and death ==
Harrington and her husband, Edward, had a son and a daughter. She died in New York City from complications of a stroke suffered the previous year.

== Film ==
- Scattergood Baines (1941) as Gertrude Brown
- Riding the Wind (1942) as Martha MacLeod
- Come on Danger (1942) as Maggie (Jed's wife)
- Wintertime (1943) as Bridge player (uncredited)
- Reckless Age (1944) as Spinster (uncredited)
- See My Lawyer (1945) as Side Show Performer (uncredited)
- Rhapsody in Blue (1945) as Music teacher (uncredited)
- Madigan (1968) as Woman
- Rachel, Rachel (1968) as May Cameron
- Love Story (1970) as (uncredited)
- The Hospital (1971) as Nurse Dunne
- Child's Play (1972) as Mrs. Carter
- The Sentinel (1977) as Anna Clark (final film role)

== Television ==
- Hallmark Hall of Fame: The Cradle Song (1956) as Sister Tomera
- Ford Star Jubilee: This Happy Breed (1956)
- Hallmark Hall of Fame: The Cradle Song (1960) as Sister Tomera
- NBC Experiment in Television: Big Sur (1969)
- All My Children (March 1970 - July 1970) as Kate Martin #2
- The Guiding Light (1971-1972) as Marion Conway #2
- Great Performances The Rimers of Eldritch (1972) as Martha Truit
- All About Welfare: The Resolution of Mossie Wax (1973) as Mossie Wax
- Wide World of Mystery: And the Bones Came Together (1973)
