= Land of the Open Range =

1942 film by Edward Killy

- Directed by: Edward Killy
- Produced by: Bert Gilroy
- Starring: Tim Holt
- Cinematography: Harry J. Wild
- Production company: RKO Radio Pictures
- Release date: April 17, 1942 (U.S.)
- Country: United States
- Language: English
- Budget: $49,000

Land of the Open Range is a 1942 Western film. It uses out takes from Cimarron (1931).

== Plot ==
Luke Archer's will stipulates that his huge land holding will be open for filing, but only to ex-convicts who served at least two years in prison. This brings a large criminal element to town but the real crooks are Archer's Lawyer Carse and his henchmen. Dave and his deputies are aided by ex-safecracker Pinky who uses his skills to learn of Carse's plan.

== Production ==
It was based on a magazine article "Homesteads of Hate".

Filming started August 1941.
