= Fighting Frontier =

1943 film by Lambert Hillyer

- Theatrical release poster
- Directed by: Lambert Hillyer
- Produced by: Bert Gilroy
- Starring: Tim Holt
- Cinematography: Jack Greenhalgh
- Edited by: Les Millbrook
- Distributed by: RKO Radio Pictures
- Release date: January 15, 1943
- Country: United States
- Language: English

Fighting Frontier is a 1943 Western film directed by Lambert Hillyer.

== Plot ==
In the Old West, Kit Russell is identified as one of a gang of bandits that robs Commissioner Slocum’s stage en route to Marlin City, Arizona. However, both of the two identifying witnesses are threatened and Kit’s case is dismissed for lack of evidence. It is revealed that Kit is actually an undercover investigator appointed by the governor to infiltrate the gang and discover its leader. Kit’s girlfriend, Jeannie, is unaware of Kit’s assignment and thinks he has turned into a criminal. The gang steals gold from Walton Mining Company. Frustrated by lack of justice, the mine’s owner, Frank Walton, forms a vigilante posse. Walton’s men locate the bandits’ hideout. A gunfight ensues and the vigilantes breach the hideout, capturing Kit. Walton refuses to turn the outlaws over to the sheriff, but allows Judge Halvorsen, Jeannie’s father, to see Kit. The judge, aware of Kit’s undercover role, encourages Kit to reveal himself to Walton, but Kit refuses. Kit and the rest of the gang are convicted by the vigilante court and sentenced to hang. Kit discovers Commissioner Slocum is the boss of the outlaw gang and tells Walton, who doesn’t believe him. Kit knocks out the guard and escapes with his pal, Ike. Slocum, aware of Kit’s mission, prepares to leave town. Kit intervenes and a gunfight ensues. Slocum’s gang surrenders, but Slocum escapes on a buckboard and is pursued by Kit. Kit catches Slocum, subdues him and turns him over to the sheriff. Kit and Jeannie are reconciled.

== Cast ==
- Tim Holt as Kit Russell
- Cliff Edwards as Ike
- Ann Summers as Jeannie Halvorsen
- William Gould as Commissioner Daniel Slocum
- Slim Whitaker as Sheriff Logan
- Eddie Dew as Frank Walton
- Tom London as Snap
- Monte Montague as Pete
- Jack Rockwell as Ira Jessup

== External list ==
- Fighting Frontier at IMDb
