= Tim Holt =

American actor (1919–1973)

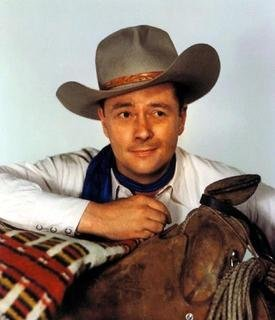
- Holt in 1948
- Born: Charles John Holt III; February 5, 1919; Beverly Hills, California, U.S.
- Died: February 15, 1973 (aged 54); Shawnee, Oklahoma, U.S.
- Resting place: Memory Lane Cemetery; Harrah, Oklahoma, U.S.
- Education: Culver Military Academy
- Occupation: Actor
- Years active: 1927–1971
- Spouses: Virginia Ashcroft (m. 1938; div. 1944) Alice Harrison (m. 1944; div. 1952) Berdee Stephens (m. 1952)
- Children: 4
- Father: Jack Holt
- Relatives: Jennifer Holt (sister)

Charles John "Tim" Holt III (February 5, 1919 – February 15, 1973) was an American actor. He was a popular Western star during the 1940s and early 1950s, appearing in forty-six B westerns released by RKO Pictures.

In a career spanning more than four decades, Holt is best remembered for his roles in the films The Magnificent Ambersons (1942), My Darling Clementine (1946) and The Treasure of the Sierra Madre (1948).

== Early life ==
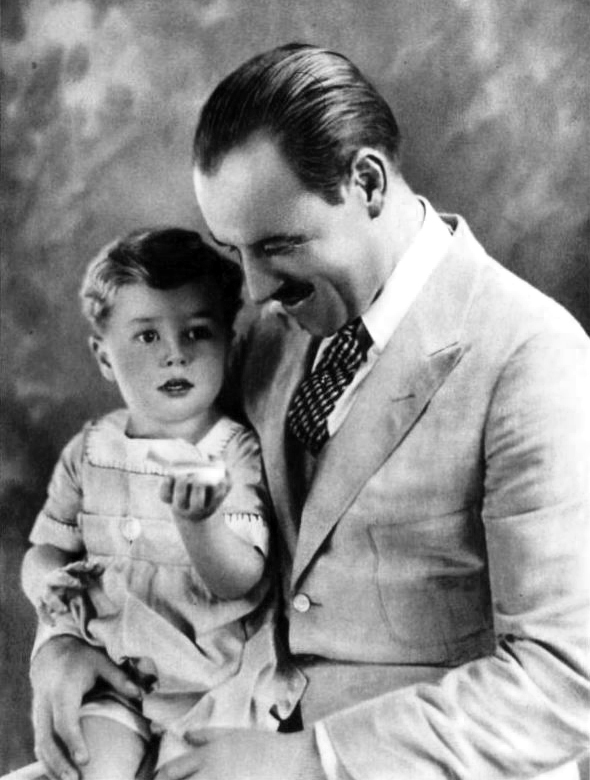
Tim Holt and his father, actor Jack Holt (1921)

Holt was born Charles John Holt III on February 5, 1919, in Beverly Hills, California, the son of actor Jack Holt and Margaret Woods. During his early years, he accompanied his father on location, even appearing in an early silent film. He was the inspiration for his father's book, Lance and His First Horse.

Holt was educated at Culver Military Academy in Culver, Indiana, graduating in 1936. One of his classmates was Budd Boetticher, who recalled Holt "used to walk around in our suite of rooms there...and he often had on his .38 revolvers and holster. He'd walk up and down the hall in his bathrobe and practice drawing his guns. He'd say, ‘I'm going to be a western star some day’." Immediately after graduation he went to work in the Hollywood film business.

His sister, Jennifer Holt, also appeared in B-westerns, notably opposite Johnny Mack Brown at Universal.

== Acting career ==
=== Walter Wanger ===
Holt was signed to a contract by producer Walter Wanger in January 1937. Wanger was going to use him in Blockade, but that film was postponed.

Instead he made his debut as Anne Shirley's suitor in Stella Dallas (1937) for Sam Goldwyn – the same role that another film star's son, Douglas Fairbanks Jr., had played in the 1925 version. When told he was given the role his father Jack said, "Fine. Let's have one good actor in the family." Wanger then cast him in I Met My Love Again (1938) and used him for a Technicolor Western, Gold is Where You Find It. In the latter the Los Angeles Times said Holt "confirms the favorable impression he gave" in Stella Dallas.

RKO borrowed him for a western, The Renegade Ranger (1938), supporting George O'Brien, then a leading star of B-westerns. Wanger wanted to star Holt opposite Henry Fonda and Louise Platt in an adaptation of Vincent Sheean's Personal History; however after the problems Wanger had making Blockade he decided to postpone the project. (It was later filmed as Foreign Correspondent.) He lent Holt to Paramount to play the juvenile lead in Sons of the Legion then RKO asked for him again in The Law West of Tombstone, supporting Harry Carey.

Wanger then used Holt in the role of young Lieutenant Blanchard in the 1939 classic Stagecoach. At Universal he appeared in a story of his old alma mater, Culver Military Academy, The Spirit of Culver. His contract with Wanger expired. RKO signed Holt to a seven-year contract in December 1938.

=== RKO Pictures ===
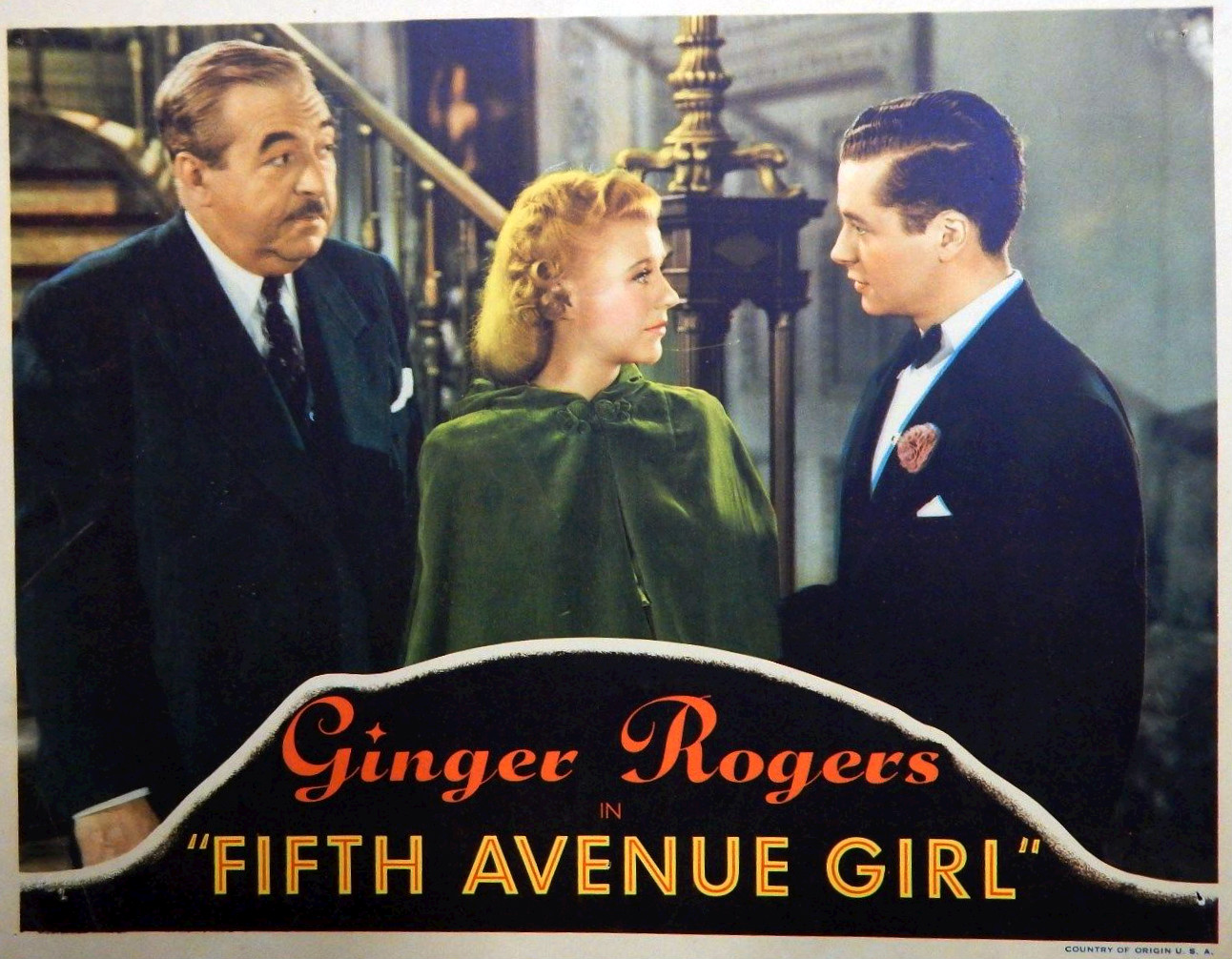
Lobby card for 5th Avenue Girl (1939)

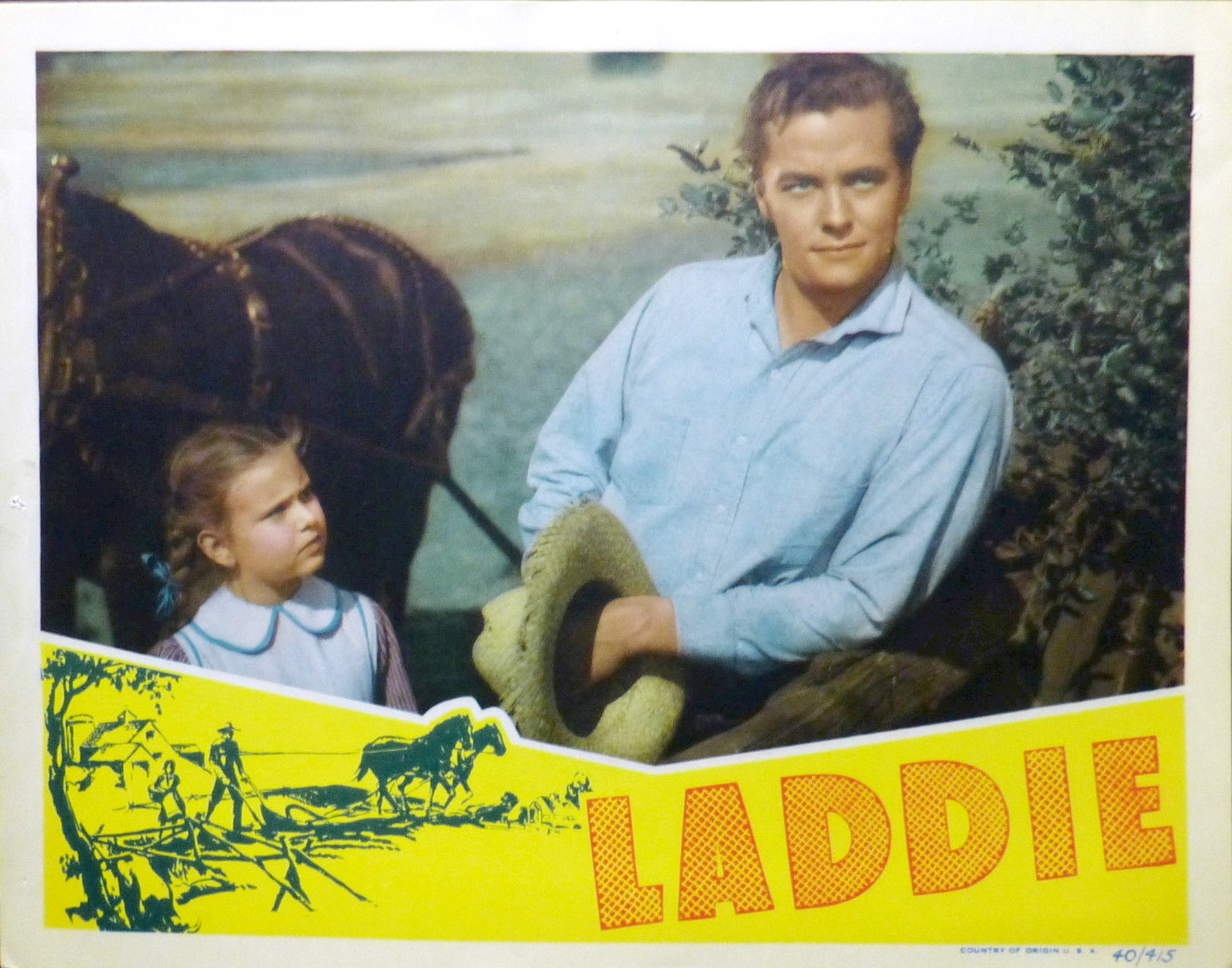
Lobby card for Laddie (1940)

RKO gave Holt his first lead in the B-film The Rookie Cop. It was popular, and RKO put him in The Girl and the Gambler opposite Leo Carrillo. He was then cast as the romantic lead for the studio's biggest star, Ginger Rogers, in 5th Avenue Girl (1939). It was popular and the Los Angeles Times said Holt "does unusually well in this", although the New York Times thought he "seems a trifle young to be running a great corporation". He was meant to play the eldest son in Three Sons (1939) with Edward Ellis, but he was withdrawn and replaced by William Gargan. He was also meant to star in a Western, Silver City, with Betty Grable, but it was not made. In early 1940 it was announced Holt and Ginger Rogers would be reunited in an adaptation of The Enchanted Cottage. The film was not made until several years later with different stars. Instead he was assigned to play Fritz Robinson in the studio's expensive adaptation of Swiss Family Robinson (1940). He also played the lead in Laddie (1940); the Los Angeles Times called him "engaging and capable". Swiss Family Robinson was a financial failure and Laddie was not particularly popular.

==== Western star ====
During the late 1930s, actor George O'Brien had made a number of low-budget Westerns for RKO. Holt later recalled, "I believe George O’Brien quit over money so RKO needed another Western star and I was put forward." In early 1940, RKO announced Holt would make six low-budget B-Westerns, starting with Wagon Train with Martha O'Driscoll. O'Driscoll and Holt were meant to reteam in Sir Piegan Passes but it was not made. Instead Holt appeared in The Fargo Kid. Universal borrowed him to play Charles Boyer's son in Back Street (1941). The Los Angeles Times said Holt had "some splendid scenes towards the end". Then it was back to Westerns: Robbers of the Range (1941), Along the Rio Grande (1941), Cyclone on Horseback (1941) and Six-Gun Gold (1941). Holt usually played a cowboy who had one or two friends, who occasionally sang. From 1940 to 1942 he made 18 Westerns. His first sidekick was Ray Whitley, who was slightly older than Holt, and who would usually sing a song or two in each film. The other sidekick was a character "Whopper" played by Emmett Lynn and then Lee White. 1942 they were replaced by Cliff Edwards as Ike. Author Tom Stempel later recalled:

Holt, unlike many other B western stars, played characters not named Tim Holt. From his debut in 1934 Gene Autry always played "Gene Autry" and after 1941 Roy Rogers always played "Roy Rogers", but Holt's names varied, even if the basic character he played is the same... In these early films Tim's jobs were diverse. While Hopalong Cassidy was always the foreman of the Bar 20 Ranch, Tim played a cowboy, a Treasury agent, a Texas Ranger, or a number of other occupations. The characters were pretty much the same: Tim, with his boyish good looks, is drawn into situations where he must right some wrongs. Holt had a charming personality on the screen, which made him one of the top western stars from 1940 to 1943.

The Westerns proved popular and Holt wound up making six more: The Bandit Trail (1941), Dude Cowboy (1941), Riding the Wind (1942), Land of the Open Range (1942), Come on Danger (1942) and Thundering Hoofs (1942).

==== The Magnificent Ambersons ====
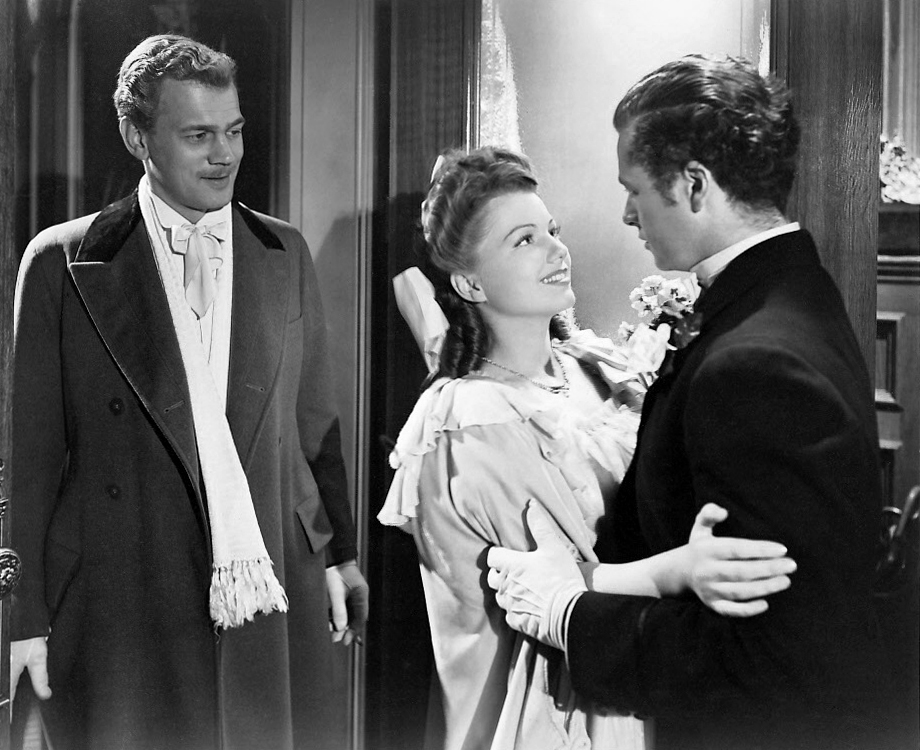
Joseph Cotten, Anne Baxter and Tim Holt in The Magnificent Ambersons (1942)

Holt's career received a boost in September 1941 when Orson Welles cast him as the lead in his second film, The Magnificent Ambersons (1942). "It was a lucky decision", Welles later said, calling Holt "one of the most interesting actors that's ever been in American movies". The Washington Post thought Holt "gives an excellent account of himself". The New York Times said he "draws out all the meanness in George's character which is precisely what the role demands". (In 1965 Welles wanted to reshoot the ending with those of the original cast still alive, including Holt, but it did not happen.)

RKO announced they had purchased two stories for Holt, Five of Spades (which became The Avenging Rider) and Adventures of Salt Valley. He was already announced for There Goes Lona Henry. Holt was going to enter the army, so RKO quickly put him in six more Westerns: Bandit Ranger (1942), Red River Robin Hood (1942), Pirates of the Prairie (1942), Fighting Frontier (1943), Sagebrush Law (1943) and The Avenging Rider (1942). His entry into the U.S. Army Air Forces was delayed long enough so that Holt could star in Hitler's Children (1943). He was called to active duty during production. The film proved to be one of RKO's most profitable during the war.

==== War service ====
Holt became a decorated combat veteran of World War II, flying in the Pacific Theatre with the United States Army Air Forces as a B-29 bombardier. He was wounded over Tokyo on the last day of the war and was awarded a Purple Heart. He was also a recipient of the Distinguished Flying Cross.

=== Post-war ===
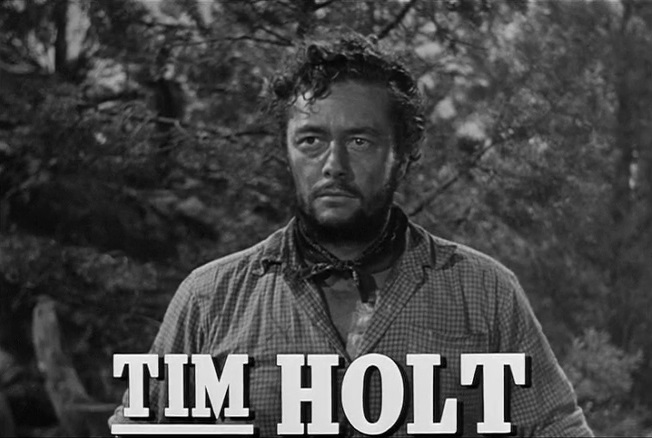
Tim Holt in the trailer for The Treasure of the Sierra Madre (1948)

Following the war, Holt returned to films and went back to RKO. According to his biographer David Rothel, "No more was he the callow, youthful cowboy with big, silly grin on his face. Now he exuded a steady, serious no-nonsense type of mature cowboy who was less impulsive, more contemporary, and somewhat ‘world weary." Tom Stempel argues that "While Holt had lost his baby fat during the war, he still had a wonderful grin and cute dimples. He used the mixture of charm and seriousness very well."

His post-war career began well when 20th Century Fox borrowed him to play Virgil Earp alongside Henry Fonda's Wyatt Earp in the John Ford western My Darling Clementine (1946). For RKO he appeared in a series of Zane Gray adaptations: Thunder Mountain (1947), Under the Tonto Rim (1947) and Wild Horse Mesa (1947). He also made Western Heritage (1947), which was an original screenplay. The budgets were around $100,000 a film, making them among the more expensive B Westerns.

==== The Treasure of the Sierra Madre ====
Holt was next borrowed by Warner Bros for the role for which he is probably best remembered — that of Bob Curtin to Humphrey Bogart's Fred C. Dobbs in John Huston's The Treasure of the Sierra Madre (1948), about two men who team up to prospect for gold, only to have greed tear apart their partnership. Holt's father also appeared in a small part. Tim Holt tended to be outshone in reviews by Bogart and Walter Huston, the latter winning an Oscar for Best Supporting Actor for his performance. However the Chicago Daily Tribune said he was "very likeable". The Los Angeles Times said Holt "gives a rare and sincere impression of character in his performance".

According to the Los Angeles Times, Holt's casting in Madre impressed RKO studio chief Dore Schary who announced "expanding plans" for the actor, looking to cast him in films other than Westerns. He also promised a bigger budget for Holt's Westerns such as The Arizona Ranger (1948), which cast him opposite his father. However the films remained undistinguished: Guns of Hate (1948), Indian Agent (1948) and Gun Smugglers (1948).

His most frequent director was Lesley Selander and his sidekick in more than 25 of these movies was Richard Martin. Martin played Chito Jose Gonzales Bustamente Rafferty, a character created by writer Jack Wagner for the 1943 film Bombardier and who had appeared in some Robert Mitchum westerns before being put into Tim Holt films. Stempel:

The chemistry between Holt and Martin was immediate. Tim was entertained by Chito's constant pursuit of the ladies, which gave Holt a variety of reactions to play: amusement, surprise, slight irritation, bafflement at the hopelessness of Chito's attempted conquests. Unlike Hopalong Cassidy's young sidekick Lucky, who just mooned after girls, Chito was active, which was a lot more interesting to watch, especially with Tim's reactions. Chito was not just a lovesick fool, but he was also ready for action. As he explained his name, his mother was Spanish, and the Spanish is for loving, and his father was Irish, which is for fighting. Chito performed the crucial functions of a B western movie sidekick: he was somebody with whom the hero could discuss the plot, and he provided some comedy relief. In the 47–52 series, the comic relief is verbal rather than visual, and often a part of the story. The directors can shoot both Chito's flirting and Tim's reaction in one shot. Unlike other B westerns, such as those Holts with Cliff Edwards, the movie does not have to stop while the comic does his routine. It makes for much smoother flowing films.

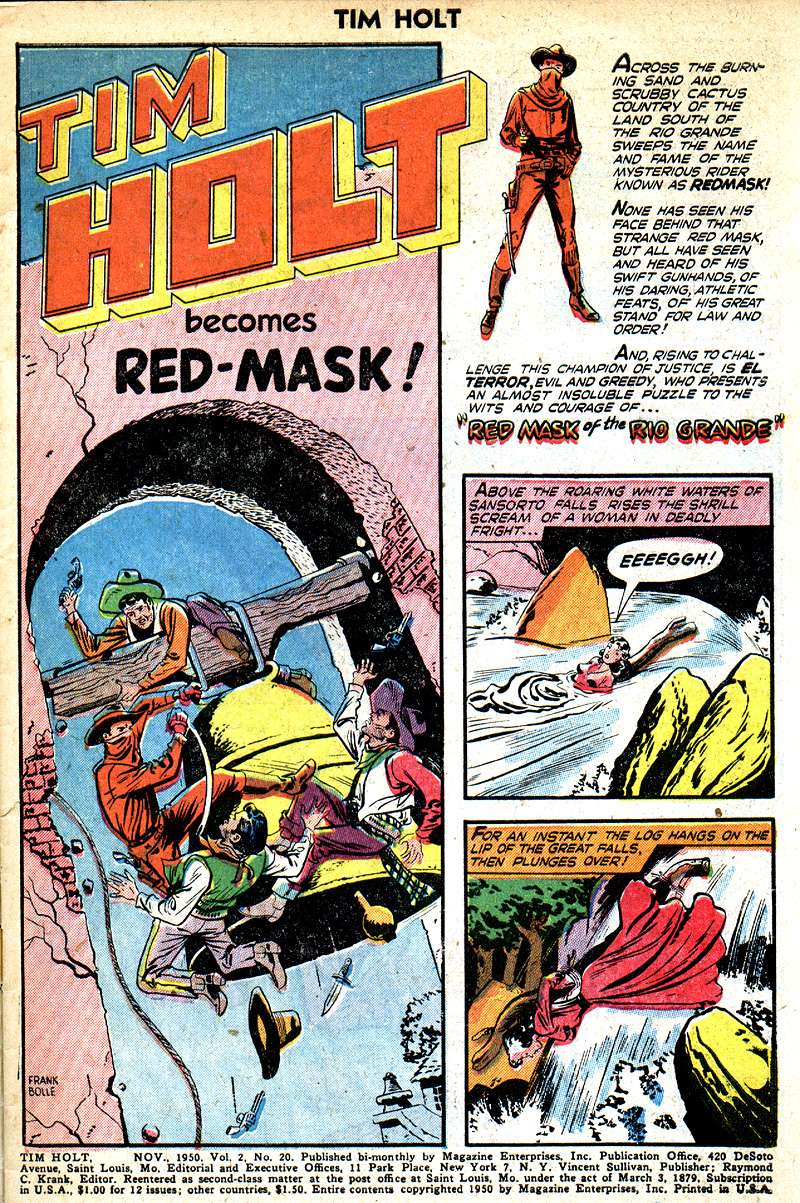
Tim Holt #20 (November 1950), art by Frank Bolle.

In 1948, Tim Holt was also featured as the hero of a comic book series published by Magazine Enterprises. Following a pattern seen with other cowboy characters published by the company, Holt was reinvented as the masked hero Red Mask in issue #20. This new identity lasted until issue #42, when the licensing agreement between Magazine Enterprises and Tim Holt's representatives was dissolved. As a result, the comic book was retitled simply as Red Mask and continued publication without Tim Holt's name or likeness from that point onward.

However that year Brothers in the Saddle (1948) recorded a loss of $35,000 as the growth of TV and decline in cinema audiences started to cut into Holt's market.

=== Later movies ===
Dore Schary left RKO in 1948 and the new management was not keen to cast Holt in anything other than Westerns: Rustlers (1949), Stagecoach Kid (1949), Masked Raiders (1949), The Mysterious Desperado (1949) and Riders of the Range (1949). The latter lost $50,000.

The Westerns continued: Dynamite Pass (1950), Storm over Wyoming (1950), Rider from Tucson (1950), Border Treasure (1950) and Rio Grande Patrol (1950). Law of the Badlands (1951) was the cheapest Tim Holt vehicle since the war years, made for $98,000, but still recorded a loss of $20,000.

After Gunplay (1951), Saddle Legion (1951) had a higher quality female lead – Dorothy Malone – and then Holt unexpectedly appeared in an "A", supporting Robert Mitchum and Jane Russell in His Kind of Woman for director John Farrow.

In September 1950 it was announced Holt would support Montgomery Clift for director Nicholas Ray in The Flying Leathernecks (1951) but the film was made without either actor.

Instead it was back to Westerns: Pistol Harvest (1951), Hot Lead (1951), Overland Telegraph (1951), Trail Guide (1952), Road Agent (1952), Target (1952), and finally Desert Passage (1952). The latter lost $30,000 so it was decided to end the series.

He made a TV appearance for Chevron Theatre.

== Later career ==
Holt had been to Oklahoma in 1947 with a rodeo, and met the woman who became his final wife. When his movie series ended he decided to move to Oklahoma for good. "I never did like Hollywood that much... there was nothing magical about it for me", he said.

He was absent from the screen for five years until he starred in a horror film, The Monster That Challenged the World, in 1957, Holt said it "wasn't too bad a picture at all". Over the next 16 years, he appeared in only two more motion pictures as well as an episode of The Virginian. He was going to make a sequel to Treasure of the Sierra Madre with Nick Adams, but Adams died.

However he kept busy managing theatres and making personal appearances. He got a degree in animal nutrition from Iowa, worked as a builder, produced rodeos, staged and performed Western music jamborees, and worked as an advertising manager for a radio station from 1962 onwards. Holt later said of this period:

Do you realize that this is the first time in my life that I can make my own decisions and do what I want to do? First it was my parents who told me what to do, then RKO told me what to do, then I went into the service and Uncle Sam told me what to do. I came back out and RKO still told me what to do. This is the first time I have not been under somebody's thumb in my life.

Holt's film career has also been commemorated in a trading card set.

The Western Films of Tim Holt comprises 70 cards featuring 140 images from all 47 of his Western films, including movie posters, lobby cards, inserts and other promotional artwork. The cards bear a 1999 copyright notice stating that they were produced under license from Holt.

== Personal life ==
Holt was married three times and had four children: three sons (one from his first marriage) and a daughter.

Tim Holt died from bone cancer on February 15, 1973, in Shawnee, Oklahoma, where he had been managing a radio station. He was interred in the Memory Lane Cemetery in Harrah, Oklahoma. The street where he and his wife had lived in Harrah was subsequently renamed Tim Holt Drive in his honor.

== Legacy ==
Robert Mott of the Washington Post later said of Holt:

Holt was the hero, strong and silent and always more comfortable in the presence of boots and saddles, horses and he-men, than with the heroine – though he almost invariably ended up marrying her... Like many sons of famous entertainers, Tim Holt never achieved the stature of his father, and projected a bland image in contrast with the elder Holt's strong characterisation.

In 1991, Tim Holt was inducted posthumously into the Western Performers Hall of Fame at the National Cowboy & Western Heritage Museum in Oklahoma City, Oklahoma. In 1992, the Golden Boot Awards honored Holt for his lifetime contributions to western cinema.

== Filmography ==
- French Dressing (1927) (uncredited)
- The Vanishing Pioneer (1928) as John Ballard, Age 7
- History Is Made at Night (1937) as S.O.S. Radio Operator (uncredited)
- Stella Dallas (1937) as Richard Grosvenor
- I Met My Love Again (1938) as Budge Williams
- Gold Is Where You Find It (1938) as Lance Ferris
- The Renegade Ranger (1938) as Larry Corwin
- Sons of the Legion (1938) as Steven Scott
- The Law West of Tombstone (1938) as Ted aka The Tonto Kid
- Stagecoach (1939) as Lieutenant Blanchard
- The Spirit of Culver (1939) as Capt. Wilson
- The Rookie Cop (1939) as Clem Maitland
- The Girl and the Gambler (1939) as Johnny Powell
- Fifth Avenue Girl (1939) as Tim Borden
- Laddie (1940) as Laddie Stanton
- Swiss Family Robinson (1940) as Fritz Robinson
- Wagon Train (1940) as Zack Sibley
- The Fargo Kid (1940) as The Fargo Kid
- Back Street (1941) as Richard Saxel
- Along the Rio Grande (1941) as Jeff
- Robbers of the Range (1941) as Jim Drummond aka Curly Yantis
- Cyclone on Horseback (1941) as Stan Bradford
- Six Gun Gold (1941) as Don Cardigan
- The Bandit Trail (1941) as Steve Haggerty
- Dude Cowboy (1941) as Terry McVey
- Riding the Wind (1942) as Clay Stewart
- Land of the Open Range (1942) as Dave Walton
- Come on Danger (1942) as Jack Mason
- The Magnificent Ambersons (1942) as George Minafer
- Thundering Hoofs (1942) as Bill Underwood aka Bill Dawson
- Bandit Ranger (1942) as Clay Travers
- Red River Robin Hood (1942) as Jim Carey
- Pirates of the Prairie (1942) as Deputy Marshal Larry Durant
- Hitler's Children (1943) as Lieutenant Karl Bruner
- Fighting Frontier (1943) as Kit Russell
- Sagebrush Law (1943) as Tom Weston
- The Avenging Rider (1943) as Brit Marshall
- My Darling Clementine (1946) as Virgil Earp
- Thunder Mountain (1947) as Marvin Hayden
- Under the Tonto Rim (1947) as Brad Canfield
- Wild Horse Mesa (1947) as Dave Jordan
- The Treasure of the Sierra Madre (1948) as Bob Curtin
- Western Heritage (1948) as Ross Daggert
- The Arizona Ranger (1948) as Bob Morgan
- Guns of Hate (1948) as Bob Banning
- Indian Agent (1948) as Dave Taylor
- Gun Smugglers (1948) as Himself
- Brothers in the Saddle (1949) as Tim Taylor
- Rustlers (1949) as Dick McBride
- Stagecoach Kid (1949) as Dave Collins
- Masked Raiders (1949) as Himself
- The Mysterious Desperado (1949) as Himself
- Riders of the Range (1950) as Kansas Jones
- Dynamite Pass (1950) as Ross Taylor
- Storm Over Wyoming (1950) as Dave Saunders
- Rider from Tucson (1950) as Dave Saunders
- Border Treasure (1950) as Ed Porter
- Rio Grande Patrol (1950) as Kansas
- Law of the Badlands (1951) as Dave Saunders
- Saddle Legion (1951) as Dave Saunders
- Gunplay (1951) as Himself
- His Kind of Woman (1951) as Bill Lusk
- Pistol Harvest (1951) as Tim
- Hot Lead (1951) as Himself
- Overland Telegraph (1951) as Himself
- Trail Guide (1952) as Himself
- Road Agent (1952) as Himself
- Target (1952) as Himself
- Desert Passage (1952) as Himself
- Chevron Theatre (1953, TV series, "Adventure in Java")
- The Monster That Challenged the World (1957) as Lt. Cmdr. John 'Twill' Twillinger
- The Yesterday Machine (1963) as Police Lt. Partane
- The Virginian (1969 TV show, "A Woman of Stone") as Abe Landeen
- This Stuff'll Kill Ya! (1971) as Agent Clark (final film role)

== Box office ranking ==
For a number of years Holt was voted by US exhibitors as among the most popular Western stars in the country.

- 1949 – 4th
- 1951 – 3rd
- 1952 – 5th
