= Pirates of the Prairie =

1942 film by Howard Bretherton

- Directed by: Howard Bretherton
- Written by: Berne Giler
- Screenplay by: Doris Schroeder; J. Benton Cheney; Morton Grant
- Produced by: Bert Gilroy
- Starring: Tim Holt; Cliff Edwards; Nell O'Day
- Cinematography: Nicholas Musuraca
- Edited by: John Lockert
- Music by: Paul Sawtell
- Distributed by: RKO Radio Pictures
- Release date: November 20, 1942 (U.S.)
- Running time: 57 minutes
- Country: United States
- Language: English

Pirates of the Prairie is a 1942 American Western film directed by Howard Bretherton and starring Tim Holt, Cliff Edwards and Nell O'Day. Produced by RKO Pictures, it was inspired by the Banditti of the Prairie. The plotline is strikingly similar to the 1940 film Legion of the Lawless. Doris Schroeder is credited with the screenplay for both films.

== Plot ==
In the Old West, deputy marshal Larry Durant comes to Spencerville to establish his gunsmith business. He discovers the town is run by a vigilante committee, which was organized to keep law and order, but is now terrorizing the farmers and business owners to control the town before the coming of the railroad. The vigilante committee is led by the corrupt Lew Harmon who demands Durant leave town. Harmon's brother-in-law, John Spencer, is honest but has been fooled by Harmon to believe Harmon is doing his job. Spencer's daughter, Helen, has been deceived as well. Durant's friend, Allen, is the chief surveyor, and tells Durant plans are being formed to build a depot for the coming railroad in East Spencerville rather than Spencerville. Durant's sidekick, Ike, inadvertently reveals the plans to Harmon and his gang, but Durant thinks it was Helen. Harmon's gang force the land owners of East Spencerville to sell their property. When they force store owner Rufe Jackson to sell out, Durant and Ike intervene. A gunfight ensues injuring Rufe's wife and killing one of Harmon's henchmen. Durant discovers other land deeds the gang forced owners to sign.

In light of the assault of East Spencerville, John Spencer calls a meeting of the vigilante committee to disband it, but Harmon orders him to be shot and killed as he leaves Harmon's ranch. At the meeting, Harmon announces the railroad is going through East Spencerville and falsely says Durant and Allen are in cahoots. Durant finds John Spencer's body and reports his death. Harmon accuses Durant of the murder. Ike interrupts the meeting and is chased out of town by Harmon's gang and shot. Injured, Ike finds Durant and reports Harmon's plans to kill Durant and move in on East Spencerville. Ike confesses that he is the one who revealed the plans to redirect the railroad. Durant rides to East Spencerville and warns the citizens of the vigilantes' plans. A gunfight ensues when the vigilantes ride into East Spencerville. Durant arrests Harmon and part of his gang and secures them in the jail. Harmon's remaining gang break into the jail and free Harmon. The gang rides back to Spencerville with Durant in pursuit. Durant finds the gang at the bar and a gunfight ensues. Harmon is shot and killed by Durant. The rest of the gang is arrested. Ike announces plans to consolidate the two towns. Durant bids farewell. Ike, who has anxiously waited for his fiancée Genevieve, to arrive, hurries out of town when she finally arrives with several children in tow.

== Cast ==
- Tim Holt as Deputy Marshal Larry Durant
- Cliff Edwards as Ike (as Cliff 'Ukulele Ike' Edwards)
- Nell O'Day as Helen Spencer
- John Elliott as John Spencer (as John H. Elliott)
- Roy Barcroft as Lew Harmon
- Karl Hackett as Rufe Jackson
- Ed Cassidy as Chief Surveyor Allen (as Edward Cassidy)
- Charles King as Henchman Layton
