= Lesley Selander =

American film director (1900–1979)

- Born: 26 May 1900; Los Angeles, California
- Died: 5 December 1979 (aged 79); Los Alamitos, California
- Occupations: Film director, television director

Lesley Selander (May 26, 1900 – December 5, 1979) was an American film director of Westerns and adventure movies. His career as director, spanning 127 feature films and dozens of TV episodes, lasted from 1936 to 1968. Before that, Selander was assistant director on films such as The Cat and the Fiddle (1934), A Night at the Opera (1935), and Fritz Lang's Fury (1936).

To this day Selander remains one of the most prolific directors of feature Westerns in cinema history, having taken the helm for 107 Westerns between his first directorial feature in 1936 and 1967. In 1956 he was nominated for the Directors Guild of America award for Outstanding Directorial Achievement in Television, for his work directing a 1954 episode of Lassie.

== Filmography ==
- 1936: Empty Saddles
- 1936: the Boss Rider of Gun Creek
- 1936: Ride 'Em Cowboy
- 1937: The Barrier
- 1937: Black Aces
- 1937: Hopalong Rides Again
- 1937: Smoke Tree Range
- 1937: Left-Handed Law
- 1937: Sandflow
- 1938: The Frontiersmen
- 1938: The Mysterious Rider
- 1938: Pride of the West
- 1938: Bar 20 Justice
- 1938: Heart of Arizona
- 1938: Cassidy of Bar 20
- 1938: Partners of the Plains
- 1939: Range War
- 1939: The Renegade Trail
- 1939: Heritage of the Desert
- 1939: Silver on the Sage
- 1939: Sunset Trail
- 1940: Three Men from Texas
- 1940: Knights of the Range
- 1940: Cherokee Strip
- 1940: Stagecoach War
- 1940: Hidden Gold
- 1940: The Light of Western Stars
- 1940: Santa Fe Marshal
- 1941: Riders of the Timberline
- 1941: Stick to Your Guns
- 1941: Wide Open Town
- 1941: Pirates on Horseback
- 1941: The Roundup
- 1941: Doomed Caravan
- 1942: Undercover Man
- 1942: Lost Canyon
- 1942: Red River Robin Hood
- 1942: Bandit Ranger
- 1942: Thundering Hoofs
- 1943: Bar 20
- 1943: Colt Comrades
- 1943: Buckskin Frontier
- 1943: Riders of the Deadline
- 1943: Border Patrol
- 1944: Sheriff of Las Vegas
- 1944: Firebrands of Arizona
- 1944: Sheriff of Sundown
- 1944: Cheyenne Wildcat
- 1944: Stagecoach to Monterey
- 1944: Bordertown Trail
- 1944: Call of the Rockies
- 1944: Forty Thieves
- 1944: Lumberjack
- 1945: The Fatal Witness
- 1945: Jungle Raiders
- 1945: Phantom of the Plains
- 1945: Trail of Kit Carson
- 1945: Three's a Crowd
- 1945: The Vampire's Ghost
- 1945: Great Stagecoach Robbery
- 1946: Out California Way
- 1946: Night Train to Memphis
- 1946: Traffic in Crime
- 1946: Passkey to Danger
- 1946: The Catman of Paris
- 1947: The Red Stallion
- 1947: Blackmail
- 1947: Robin Hood of Texas
- 1947: Saddle Pals
- 1947: Last Frontier Uprising
- 1947: The Pilgrim Lady
- 1948: Indian Agent
- 1948: Belle Starr's Daughter
- 1948: Panhandle
- 1948: Guns of Hate
- 1949: Masked Raiders
- 1949: The Mysterious Desperado
- 1949: Stampede
- 1949: Sky Dragon
- 1949: Rustlers
- 1949: Brothers in the Saddle
- 1949: Strike It Rich
- 1950: Dakota Lil
- 1950: Short Grass
- 1950: The Kangaroo Kid
- 1950: Rio Grande Patrol
- 1950: Rider from Tucson
- 1950: Storm Over Wyoming
- 1950: Riders of the Range
- 1951: Overland Telegraph
- 1951: Flight to Mars
- 1951: Pistol Harvest
- 1951: The Highwayman
- 1951: Gunplay
- 1951: Cavalry Scout
- 1951: I Was an American Spy
- 1951: Saddle Legion
- 1951: Law of the Badlands
- 1952: The Raiders
- 1952: Battle Zone
- 1952: Flat Top
- 1952: Desert Passage
- 1952: Road Agent
- 1952: Trail Guide
- 1952: Fort Osage
- 1953: Fighter Attack
- 1953: Fort Algiers
- 1953: The Royal African Rifles
- 1953: War Paint
- 1953: Cow Country
- 1953: Fort Vengeance
- 1954: Return from the Sea
- 1954: The Yellow Tomahawk
- 1954: Arrow in the Dust
- 1954: Dragonfly Squadron
- 1955: Fort Yuma
- 1955: Desert Sands
- 1955: Tall Man Riding
- 1955: Shotgun
- 1956: Quincannon, Frontier Scout
- 1956: The Broken Star
- 1956: The Lone Ranger
- 1957: The Wayward Girl
- 1957: Taming Sutton's Gal
- 1957: Outlaw's Son
- 1957: Revolt at Fort Laramie
- 1957: Tomahawk Trail
- 1958: The Lone Ranger and the Lost City of Gold
- 1965: Town Tamer
- 1965: Fort Courageous
- 1965: War Party
- 1965: Convict Stage
- 1966: The Texican
- 1967: Fort Utah
- 1968: Arizona Bushwhackers
