= J. Roy Hunt =

American motion picture cameraman and cinematographer

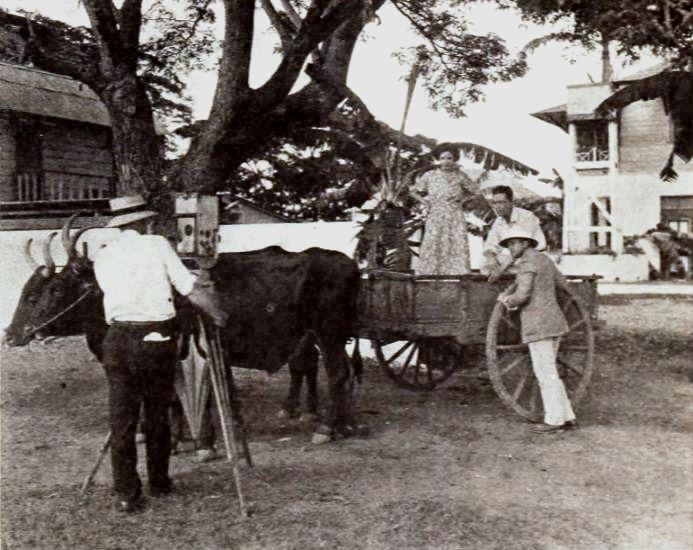
- J. Roy Hunt filming Love's Redemption (1921)
- Born: John Roy Hunt; July 7, 1884; Caperton, West Virginia, U.S.
- Died: October 1972 (aged 88); Sheffield, Alabama, U.S.
- Occupation: Cinematographer
- Years active: 1916–1953

J. Roy Hunt (July 7, 1884 Caperton, West Virginia – October 1972 Sheffield, Alabama) born John Roy Hunt was an American motion picture cameraman and cinematographer. His career began around the time of World War I and continued to the 1950s. Hunt served as director of cinematography on numerous films, such as Beau Geste, A Kiss for Cinderella, Flying Down to Rio, and She.

== Partial filmography ==
“As I remember, I was held spellbound by a cameraman named Roy Hunt. I used him [as cinematographer] on several pictures because he was so interested in everything. He was a loquacious Southerner, and as mechanically inventive as anyone I ever saw. Almost every week he would appear with a new camera cover or an ingenious camera dolly for getting through small doors, etc….”

— Director John Cromwell, in a letter to film historian Kingsley Canham, 15 October 1973.
- A Daughter of the Gods (1916)
- The Lincoln Cycle (1917)
- The Lone Wolf (1917)
- Victory and Peace (1918)
- Pagan Love (1920)
- The Branded Woman (1920)
- Woman's Place (1921)
- What Women Will Do (1921)
- Love's Redemption (1921)
- Polly of the Follies (1922)
- Sherlock Holmes (1922)
- Smilin' Through (1922)
- Second Youth (1924)
- The Rejected Woman (1924)
- Dangerous Money (1924)
- Argentine Love (1924)
- Her Own Free Will (1924)
- The Crowded Hour (1925)
- The Manicure Girl (1925)
- Wild, Wild Susan (1925)
- Lovers in Quarantine (1925)
- A Kiss for Cinderella (1926)
- The American Venus (1926)
- Dancing Mothers (1926)
- The Ace of Cads (1926)
- She's a Sheik (1927)
- Something Always Happens (1928)
- The Fifty-Fifty Girl (1928)
- Forgotten Faces (1928)
- Take Me Home (1928)
- Interference (1929)
- The Virginian (1929)
- The Cocoanuts (1929)
- The Dance of Life (1929)
- Why Bring That Up? (1929)
- Dixiana (1930)
- The Woman Between (1931)
- Friends and Lovers (1931)
- Consolation Marriage (1931)
- Let's Try Again (1934)
- The Last Days of Pompeii (1935)
- Sea Devils (1937)
- Thundering Hoofs (1942)
- I walked with a Zombie (1943)
- Crossfire (1947)
- Gun Smugglers (1948)
- Return of the Bad Men (1948)
- Rustlers (1949)
