= AFI Catalog of Feature Films =

Project cataloging American films, launched 1967

- Available in: English
- Founded: 1967
- Headquarters: United States
- Country of origin: United States
- Services: Film catalog
- Website: aficatalog.afi.com

The AFI Catalog of Feature Films, also known as the AFI Catalog, is an ongoing project by the American Film Institute (AFI) to catalog all commercially made and theatrically exhibited American motion pictures from the birth of cinema in 1893 to the present. It began as a series of hardcover books known as The American Film Institute Catalog of Motion Pictures, and subsequently became an exclusively online film database.

Each entry in the catalog typically includes the film's title, physical description, production and distribution companies, production and release dates, cast and production credits, a plot summary, song titles, and notes on the film's history. The films are indexed by personal credits, production and distribution companies, year of release, and major and minor plot subjects.

To qualify for the "Feature Films" volumes, a film must have been commercially produced either on American soil or by an American company. In accordance with the International Federation of Film Archives (FIAF; French: Fédération Internationale des Archives du Film), the film must have also been given a theatrical release in 35 mm or larger gauge to the general public, with a running time of at least 40 minutes (or a length of at least four reels). With that said, the Catalog has included over 17,000 short films (those less than 40 minutes/four reels) from the first era of filmmaking (1893–1910).

The print version comprises five volumes documenting all films produced in the United States from 1892 to 1993, while new records are created by the AFI editorial team and added each year to the online database.

== History ==
On September 29, 1965, according to congress.gov, U.S. Senate Bill S.1483 was signed into law as the National Foundation on the Arts and Humanities Act of 1965 by the 36th U.S. President Lyndon B. Johnson; it established the American Film Institute (AFI), as well as the National Endowment for the Arts and the National Endowment for the Humanities. As there was no existing listings of films of the past—making preservation an immediate concern—the Bill obliged the AFI to build a new "catalog" of feature films that would protect cultural history from being lost in obscurity or disappearing entirely.

In 1967, the AFI officially began operation, documenting the first century of American filmmaking through the AFI Catalog of Feature Films. The Catalog was the first scholarly listing of American films, "with academically vetted information about the existence, availability and sources of motion pictures already produced, spanning the entirety of the art form since 1893."

From 1968 to 1971, AFI researched film production between 1921 and 1930 (i.e., the 1920s). The first AFI Catalog was published thereafter in 1971 by the University of California Press; the publication featured, as encyclopedic volumes, the records for every American feature film released during the 1920s.

=== Hardcover publications ===
The Catalog began as a series of hardcover books known as The American Film Institute Catalog of Motion Pictures, published by the University of California Press (excluding vol. A) from 1971 to 1993.

The print version comprises seven volumes documenting all films produced in the United States from 1892 to 1970. The publication of the hardcover volumes was suspended due to budgetary reasons after volume F4 (1941–50) in 1997. Feature films released from 1951 to 1960 and from 1971 to 1993 have been cataloged only in the online database.

Hardcover volumes
Publication date	Volume	Title	Period covered	Notes
1995	A	Film Beginnings, 1893–1910	1893–1910	Compiled by Elias Savada, published by University Press of America (ISBN 0-8108-3021-3) Subtitled "A Work in Progress" due to the scant information available on many films released in this era. Foreign-made films are included if they were released by American companies.
1971	F1	Feature Films, 1911–1920	1911–20	Edited by Patricia King Hanson (ISBN 0-520-06301-5)
1971	F2	Feature Films, 1921–1930	1921–30	Edited by Kenneth Mundin.
1993	F3	Feature Films, 1931–1940	1931–40	Edited by Patricia King Hanson. With this volume, the project began to include plot summaries written especially for the catalog from viewing the movie itself, whenever possible, instead of relying on plot summaries taken from copyright registrations, studio publicity materials, or reviews.
1997	F4	Feature Films, 1941–1950	1941–50	Edited by Patricia King Hanson.
1976	F6	Feature Films, 1961–1970	1961–70	Edited by Richard Krafsur (ISBN 9780913616451) Due to the large number of co-productions between American and foreign companies in the 1960s, and the difficulty of determining any particular film's nationality, this volume includes all feature films released theatrically in the United States in that period. The hardcover edition includes pornographic features, although they have been excluded from the electronic database edition. Errors in the print editions have been carried over to the online version, despite published criticisms, and there is no means by which users can offer discussions or corrections.
1997		Within Our Gates: Ethnicity in American Feature Films, 1911–1960	1911–60	Edited by Alan Gevinson. This is the first of the AFI Catalog series to include films from more than one decade. It contains over 2500 feature-length films whose central components include racial and national ethnic experience in the United States, such as Gentleman's Agreement (1947), Broken Arrow (1950), Bright Victory (1951), Giant (1956), and The Defiant Ones (1958). This volume also includes various independent productions by African-American filmmakers and various ethnic and religious organizations.

The project estimates that additional years will be cataloged at six-month intervals. Film school students are offered the opportunity to provide plot synopses and original research, but input from other, experienced film researchers is not encouraged. The project will also eventually catalog short films (beyond 1910) and newsreels.

== See also ==
- The Criterion Collection
- IMDb – the Internet Movie Database
- Swank Digital Campus
