= Frederic Knudtson =

American film editor (1906–1964)

- Born: April 9, 1906; North Dakota
- Died: February 15, 1964 (aged 57); Los Angeles, California
- Occupation: Film Editor
- Years active: 1932 - 1963

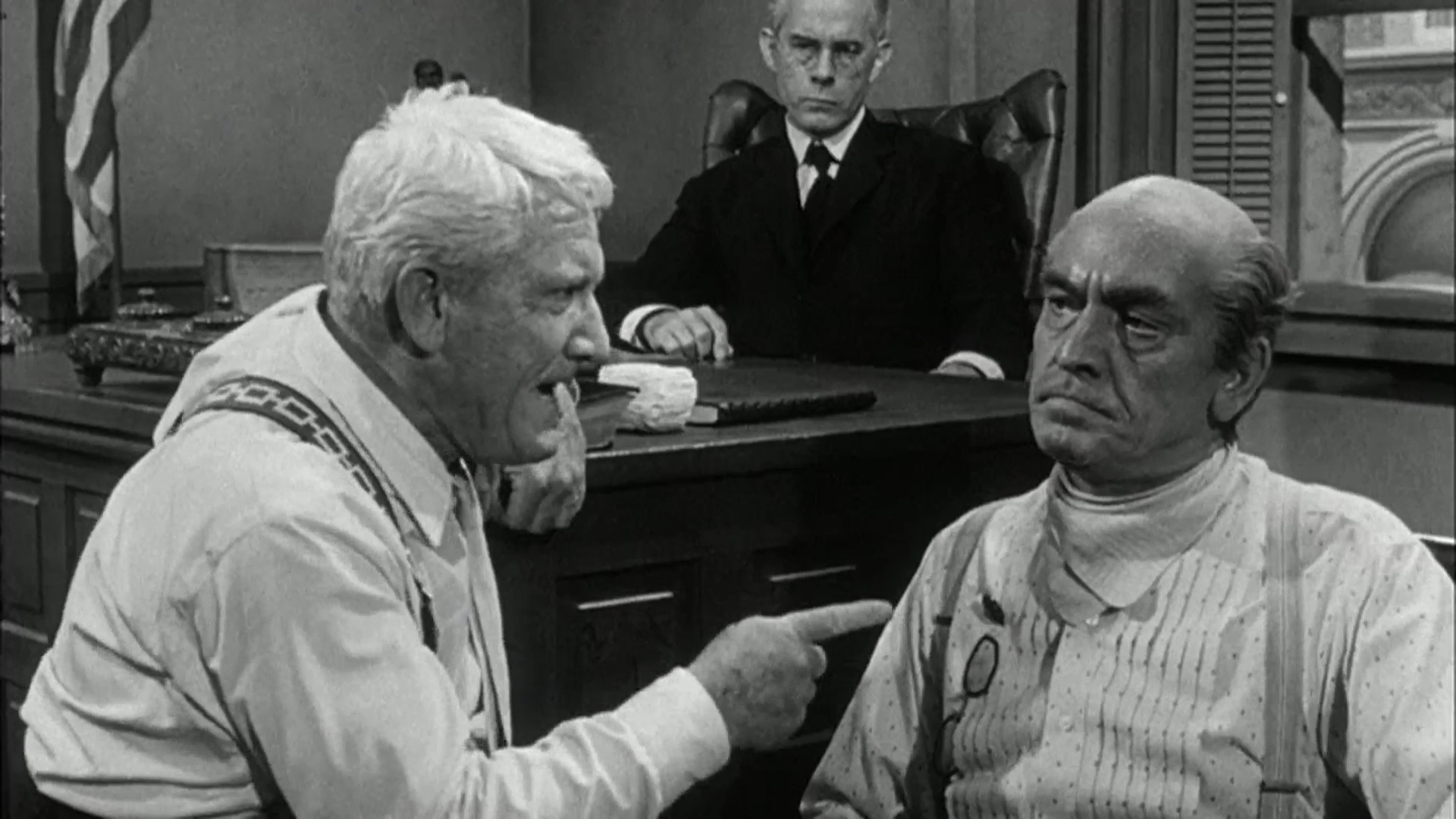
Inherit the wind trailer (1) Spencer Tracy Fredric March.jpg

Frederic Knudtson (April 9, 1906 – February 15, 1964) was an American film editor with 79 credits over his career, which spanned 1932 to 1964. He received six nominations for the Academy Award for Best Film Editing, including five in the six years preceding his death.

== Biography ==
His first credit was as an assistant editor on the 1932 film What Price Hollywood?. He then edited a string of B-movies throughout the 1930s and 1940s, picking up his first Oscar nomination in 1949 for the dark thriller The Window (directed by Ted Tetzlaff).

His professional relationship with director Stanley Kramer began in 1955, which yielded his most prolific work and garnered him five more Academy Awards nominations: The Defiant Ones (1958), On the Beach (1959), Inherit the Wind (1960), Judgment at Nuremberg (1961), and It's a Mad, Mad, Mad, Mad World (1963).

He died on February 14, 1964.
