= Salyers =

Salyers is a surname. Notable people with the surname include:

- Abigail A. Salyers (1942–2013), microbiologist
- Marc Salyers (born 1979), American basketball player
- Vincent Salyers, American professor of nursing
- William Salyers (born 1964), American actor

== See also ==
- Salyer (disambiguation)
