= Salyer =

Salyer may refer to:

== People ==
- Jamaree Salyer (born 2000), American football player
- John Clark Salyer II (1902–1966), American environmentalist and government administrator
- Karen Salyer McElmurray (born 1956), American author
- Lucy E. Salyer, American historian and professor
- Mona Salyer Lambird (1938–1999), American lawyer, first woman president of the Oklahoma Bar Association
- Philip Salyer (born 1981), American soccer player
- Saunie Salyer, American film critic
- Stephen Salyer, American businessman

== Places in the United States ==
- Salyer, California, an unincorporated community
- Salyer Lake, a reservoir in Caddo County, Oklahoma

== See also ==
- Salyer Ledge, a ridge in Victoria Land, Antarctica
- Salyers, a list of people with the surname
