= John W. Holmes =

John W. Holmes may refer to:

- John Wendell Holmes (1910–1988), Canadian diplomat and academic
- John W. Holmes (film editor) (1917–2001)
