= Night Life of the Gods =

1935 film by Lowell Sherman

- Directed by: Lowell Sherman
- Written by: Barry Trivers
- Based on: The Night Life of the Gods by Thorne Smith
- Produced by: Carl Laemmle; Carl Laemmle, Jr.
- Starring: Alan Mowbray; Florine McKinney; Peggy Shannon
- Cinematography: John J. Mescall
- Production company: Universal Pictures
- Distributed by: Universal
- Release date: March 11, 1935
- Running time: 73–75 or 80 minutes
- Country: United States
- Language: English

Night Life of the Gods (also known as Thorne Smith's Night Life of the Gods) is a 1935 American fantasy film released by Universal Pictures. Based on a 1931 novel by Thorne Smith, the film was directed by Lowell Sherman and starred Alan Mowbray as a scientist who devises a ray that can turn people to stone and bring statues to life.

For many years believed to be a lost film, a 35mm print surfaced in the 1980s in a donation to the UCLA Film and Television Archive.

== Plot ==
Eccentric scientist Hunter Hawk nearly blows himself up during an experiment. When he comes to, he finds that he is successful at last: he has created a ring that can turn living creatures into statues as well as bring statues to life. After testing the device on his dog, he makes statues of his disagreeable family; only his favorite niece, Daphne, is spared. Hawk and Daphne celebrate the petrification of their relatives with a bottle of wine after which Daphne goes off to meet her boyfriend Cyril. Hawk takes a drunken stroll through the cornfield where he encounters the gardener, Old Man Turner, who turns out to be a leprechaun. Turner takes Hawk home to meet his daughter, Meg, and the two hit it off.

They embark on a spree, turning other disagreeable people into statues left and right. At the Metropolitan Museum of Art, Hawk brings statues of Greek gods to life. Hawk and Meg take the gods on a whirlwind tour of the modern world embodied by Manhattan resulting in more mayhem, the disillusionment of the gods, and Hawk's eventual weariness with what he has wrought. Since he and Meg wish to be together, and concluding that he is certain to be locked up as a madman, he turns the ring on Meg and himself. Hawk then awakens in an ambulance and discovers that the entire evening was the result of head injuries sustained in the explosion at the beginning of the story.

== Cast ==
- Alan Mowbray as Hunter Hawk
- Florine McKinney as "Meg" Turner
- Peggy Shannon as Daphne Lambert
- Richard Carle as Grandpa Lambert
- Teresa Maxwell-Conover as Alice Lambert
- Phillips Smalley as Alfred Lambert
- Wesley Barry as Alfred Jr.
- Gilbert Emery as Betts
- Ferdinand Gottschalk as Old Man Turner
- Douglas Fowley as Cyril Sparks
- William "Stage" Boyd as Mulligan
- Henry Armetta as Roigi
- Alene Carroll as Stella
- Raymond Benard as Apollo
- George Hassell as Bacchus
- Irene Ware as Diana
- Geneva Mitchell as Hebe
- Paul Kaye as Mercury
- Robert Warwick as Neptune
- Pat De Cicco as Perseus
- Marda Deering as Venus

== Production ==
In March 1934, Carl Laemmle, Jr. purchased the rights to Thorne Smith's popular 1931 humorous fantasy The Night Life of the Gods. (Note: Smith was the leading author in the genre and had recently come to Hollywood as a script writer for M-G-M. He died in June 1934 before this film went into production.) While the plot remained essentially the same, the sexual humor was vitiated by Code considerations. The ending, too, was changed by adding the "it was only a dream" device.

At first, Lowell Sherman himself was considered for the lead role, but he suffered from laryngitis and lost his voice. Also considered for the role of Hunter Hawk was Edward Everett Horton, but Mowbray was signed in July. A well-known character actor throughout his career, this was one of Mowbray's few leading roles. Among the actors portraying gods, "Crash" Corrigan appears as Apollo (credited as Raymond Benard). Pat DiCicco made his only known screen appearance as Perseus (credited as Pat De Cicco); DiCicco was better known as a powerful Hollywood agent and for his brief, troubled marriage to Thelma Todd.

Filming took place between August 13 and October 15, 1934.

Lowell Sherman became ill while shooting Night Life of the Gods and it would be his last finished work; he died of double-pneumonia in December 1934, just days into directing Becky Sharp. (Note: Becky Sharp went into production on December 11, beginning with color testing and rehearsals; Sherman was taken to the hospital on December 25 and died three days later. Rouben Mamoulian took over directing duties on Sharp and began shooting from scratch, making Night Life Sherman's final released work.)

== Release ==
The film was released nationally on March 11, 1935. In general it received mixed reviews, some critics finding it funny in parts but drawing an unfavorable comparison to the popular novel. New York Times critic Andre Sennwald found it only "moderately entertaining", but noted that the production was at a disadvantage because of the "current cinema morality". Other critics observed that fans of farcical comedy would be entertained, such as Photoplay's brief review that commented: "If you are the type who has tried to take a cow home in an elevator... this is your picture".
