= Linda Douglas =

American model and actress (1928–2017)

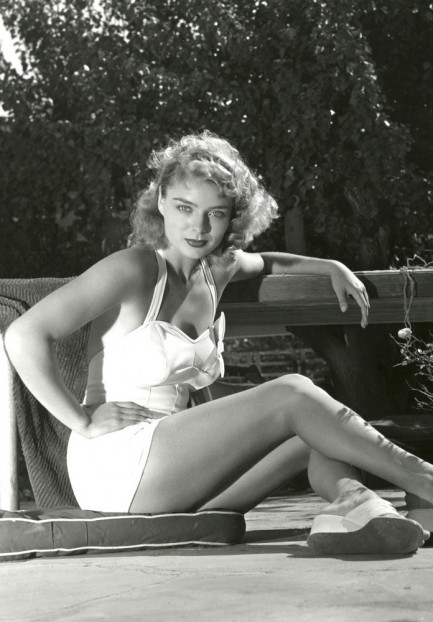
- Douglas in 1952
- Born: Mary Joanne Tarola; February 27, 1928; Portland, Oregon, U.S.
- Died: May 2017 (aged 89); Los Angeles, California, U.S.
- Other name: Mary Jo Greenberg
- Occupations: Actress; model
- Spouses: Pat DiCicco (m. 1952; div. 1960) Hank Greenberg (m. 1966; died 1986)

Linda Douglas (born Mary Joanne Tarola; February 27, 1928 – May 2017) was an American model and actress. A native of Portland, Oregon, she began modeling and appearing in beauty contests as a teenager, and was named as a Princess to the Portland Rose Festival representing Grant High in 1947. She was discovered by a talent scout of Howard Hughes while sitting in a hotel lobby in Phoenix and eventually embarked on an acting career in 1952. Under the stage name Linda Douglas, she starred in two Westerns: Trail Guide and Target (both 1952), followed by the drama Affair with a Stranger (1953), in which she was billed under her birth name.

Douglas garnered publicity when she married film producer and mobster Pat DiCicco, former husband of Thelma Todd and Gloria Vanderbilt, in 1952. The couple divorced in 1960 after eight years of marriage. Douglas subsequently married Major League Baseball player Hank Greenberg in 1966, after which she went by the name Mary Jo Greenberg. She remained married to him until his death in 1986. She died in Los Angeles in 2017.

== Biography ==
=== 1928–1950: Early life ===
Douglas was born Mary Joanne Tarola in Portland, Oregon to Mildred (née Andeerson) and Joseph Tarola. Her mother was a native of Alaska, born to Swedish immigrants, while her father was an immigrant from Italy. She had two older brothers, Hoyt and Ralph, and considered herself "a bit of a tomboy." Tall and blonde, Douglas was noticed at age 17 by a talent agent of Howard Hughes while sitting in a hotel lobby in Phoenix. She had been in Arizona at the time visiting her mother, who after divorcing Douglas' father relocated there for the drier climate in an effort to reduce symptoms of arthritis.

Douglas initially accepted Hughes' invitation and flew with her mother to Los Angeles on one of Hughes' private airplanes to complete screen tests. Recalling the event, Douglas said: "Even then, Howard Hughes had a questionable reputation regarding women. This was after he had produced The Outlaw with Jane Russell and had a slew of famous girlfriends, including Jean Harlow. Anyway, my father got wind of this–my parents were divorced–and he got word to Howard Hughes that if he laid a hand on me, he'd shoot him." After completing screen tests, Douglas was offered a film contract by Hughes at RKO Pictures, but declined. First, her father insisted, she must complete her education. She returned to Portland, where she finished her senior year at Grant High School. Douglas worked as beauty contestant and model in Portland, and was named queen of the Portland Rose Festival in 1947.

=== 1951–2016: Film career and marriages ===
Returning to Los Angeles, she made her feature film debut in the Western Trail Guide, followed by Target (both 1952), under the stage name Linda Douglas. On December 12, 1952, Douglas married film producer Pat DiCicco, former husband of Thelma Todd and Gloria Vanderbilt, in Beverly Hills, California. After the wedding Douglas formally retired from acting. "I was never really interested in it," she recalled. "And I was never comfortable with it." Douglas and DiCicco eventually divorced in 1960, after which Douglas briefly dated singer Andy Williams.

In the early 1960s, Douglas began dating Major League Baseball player Hank Greenberg. She had first met Greenberg briefly in 1955 while visiting New York City to attend the World Series with her then-husband, DiCicco: "We were the guests of Dan Topping, the then the co-owner of the Yankees... As we were getting into our limousines in front of the Park Lane Hotel, Pat took me aside to introduce me to Hank Greenberg." Douglas recalled that, after the meeting, she observed DiCicco, Topping, and others in their limousine making anti-semitic remarks: "It was my first experience with antisemitism. It left an impression." Douglas and Greenberg's romance received significant publicity, and the two were married in a small ceremony in Virginia in late November 1966, after which Douglas went by the name Mary Jo Greenberg.

=== 1966–2016: Later life ===
After marrying Greenberg, Douglas traveled between her home in Los Angeles and his in New York City, though the couple eventually settled in Los Angeles, They lived in the Fields House, a Regency-style home in Beverly Hills designed by architect Craig Ellwood. Douglas was widowed in 1986 after Greenberg's death, and spent the remainder of her life living in the home she had shared with Greenberg. In July 1999, she established the Mary Jo and Hank Greenberg Animal Welfare Foundation, a nonprofit animal welfare organization for homeless and neglected animals.

== Death ==
Douglas died in May 2017 in Los Angeles.

== Filmography ==
Year	Title	Role	Notes	Ref.
1952	Trail Guide	Peg Masters		
1952	Target	Terry Moran		
1953	Affair with a Stranger	Dolly Murray	As Mary Jo Tarola	
2001	SportsCentury: Hank Greenberg	Herself	ESPN documentary	

== Sources ==
- Greenberg, Hank (2009) [1989]. Hank Greenberg: The Story of My Life. Chicago: Ira R. Dee. ISBN 978-1-461-66238-9.
- Kurlansky, Mark (2011). Hank Greenberg: The Hero Who Didn't Want to Be One. New Haven, Connecticut: Yale University Press. ISBN 978-0-300-17514-1.
