= Spirit of Television =

1993 television series

- Created by: Michael L. White
- Starring: Gene R. Lowry (1-6); Michael L. White (7-14).
- Country of origin: United States
- No. of episodes: 14

Production
- Running time: approx. 0:50 (per episode)

Original release
- Network: Syndicated
- Release: January 5 – September 1, 1993

Spirit of Television is a syndicated American television anthology series that aired in 1993. Each episode which feature a different show from the 1950s and early 1960s America as well as cast interviews, trivia, and the odd commercial of that time.

== Cast ==
- Gene R. Lowry (Episode 1-6) – Himself, Host
- Michael L. White (episode 7 – 14) – himself, Host

== Episodes ==
- 001 – Trouble With Father
- 002 – Four Star Playhouse (David Niven)
- 003 – Texaco Star Theater
- 004 – Judge Roy Bean (TV series)
- 005 – Jack Benny Show
- 006 – Dragnet
- 007 – Make Room for Daddy
- 009 – Four Star Playhouse ([Ida Lupino])
- 010 – Kraft Television Theater
- 011 – Cisco Kid
- 012 – The George Burns and Gracie Allen Show
- 013 – The Donna Reed Show
- 014 – Tribute to Old Tucson
