= The Andromeda Strain (film) =

1971 film by Robert Wise

- Theatrical release poster
- Directed by: Robert Wise
- Screenplay by: Nelson Gidding
- Based on: The Andromeda Strain (1969 novel) by Michael Crichton
- Produced by: Robert Wise
- Starring: Arthur Hill; James Olson; Kate Reid; David Wayne; Paula Kelly; George Mitchell
- Cinematography: Richard H. Kline
- Edited by: Stuart Gilmore; John W. Holmes
- Music by: Gil Mellé
- Production company: Universal Pictures
- Distributed by: Universal Pictures
- Release date: March 12, 1971 (U.S.)
- Running time: 130 minutes
- Country: United States
- Language: English
- Budget: $6.5 million
- Box office: $12.4 million (North America)

The Andromeda Strain is a 1971 American science-fiction thriller film directed and produced by Robert Wise, adapted by Nelson Gidding from Michael Crichton's 1969 novel. It stars Arthur Hill, James Olson, Kate Reid, and David Wayne as a team of scientists who investigate a deadly organism of extraterrestrial origin.

The film closely follows the original book's plot, with only a few changes. The special effects were designed by Douglas Trumbull, and are notable for their use of advanced computerized photography. Real laboratory scenes using a spectrograph were shot at Caltech. Composer Gil Mellé recorded actual laboratory sounds for the film at the Jet Propulsion Laboratory (JPL) for authenticity while doing research for the film score.

The film was released by Universal Pictures on March 12, 1971. It received mixed-to-positive reviews, and was a moderate commercial success. At the 44th Academy Awards, the film was nominated for Best Film Editing and Best Art Direction. Mellé's score was nominated for a Golden Globe.

Microbiologist Abigail A. Salyers noted that The Andromeda Strain raised real concerns with the larger public about the risks of interplanetary contamination. Environmental scientist Michael Paul Meltzer referred to the larger story as a "touchstone for planetary protection specialists in discussing matters of back contamination and the dangers that they present". (Note: Meltzer slightly changes the meaning of Salyers' quote, implying that she was only referring to Crichton's book, but her original quote was referring to both the book and the film.)

== Plot ==
Dr. Jeremy Stone recounts the events before the United States Senate Committee on Space Sciences in 1971:

After a U.S. government satellite crashes near the small rural town of Piedmont, New Mexico, on February 5, nearly all the residents are dead. A military recovery team from Vandenberg Air Force Base sent to recover the satellite dies while trying to do so. Suspecting that the satellite has brought back an alien organism, the military activates an elite team of scientists.

Dr. Stone, the team leader, and Dr. Mark Hall, a surgeon, are dropped in by helicopter. They discover the town's doctor opened the satellite in his office and that all of his blood has crystallized into a powder, the same death befalling nearly all of the town. Stone and Hall retrieve the satellite and find two survivors, 69-year-old alcoholic Peter Jackson and six-month-old crying infant Manuel Rios.

The elite team also includes Dr. Charles Dutton and Dr. Ruth Leavitt, who join them at a top-secret Nevada underground facility, code named Wildfire. They go through four sub-levels of decontamination procedures, arriving at the fifth sub-level laboratories. If the organism threatens to escape, the Wildfire facility includes an automatic nuclear self-destruct mechanism to incinerate all infectious agents. Under the "odd-man hypothesis", Dr. Hall is entrusted with the only key that can deactivate the device, the theory being that an unmarried male is the most dispassionate person within a group to make critical decisions in a crisis.

Examining the satellite, the team discovers the microscopic alien organism that caused the deaths. The greenish, throbbing life form is assigned the code name "Andromeda." Infecting through the lungs, Andromeda kills biological life almost instantly via a blood clot in the brain and asphyxiation. It appears to be highly virulent. The team studies the organism using animal subjects, an electron microscope, and culturing in various growth media to learn how it behaves. The microbe contains the hydrogen and carbon required for terrestrial life and appears to have a crystalline structure, but lacks the DNA, RNA, proteins, and amino acids present in all forms of terrestrial life, and directly transforms energy to matter with no discernible byproducts.

Hall tries to determine why the two Piedmont residents survived. Unknown to the others, Leavitt's research on the germ is impaired by her undisclosed epilepsy.

A military jet crashes near Piedmont after the pilot radios that his plastic oxygen mask is dissolving.

Hall realizes that the alcoholic Jackson survived because his blood was too acidic from drinking Sterno, and that the baby lived due to his blood being too alkaline from constant crying, suggesting that Andromeda can survive only within a narrow range of blood pH. Just as he has this insight, the organism mutates into a non-lethal form that degrades synthetic rubber and plastic. Andromeda escapes the biocontainment room into the laboratory where Dutton is working. When Andromeda causes all the laboratory's seals to start decaying, a five-minute countdown to nuclear destruction is initiated. Hall rescues Leavitt from an epileptic seizure, triggered by the flashing red lights of Wildfire's alarm system.

The team discover that the microbe would thrive on the energy of a nuclear explosion and would consequently be transformed into a super-colony that could destroy all life on Earth. Hall races to reach a functioning station where he can disable the nuclear bomb with his key. He endures multiple attacks by automated lasers as he climbs through the laboratory's central core. He finds a working station, disables the bomb with seconds to spare, and collapses.

Hall awakens in a hospital. His colleagues reveal that clouds are being seeded over the Pacific Ocean, which will cause rain to sweep Andromeda from the atmosphere and into alkaline seawater, rendering it harmless.

Stone finishes testifying by saying that while they were able to defeat the alien pathogen, they may be unable to do so in the future. The film ends with a computer feed suddenly stopping and the computer flashing the number "601", the Wildfire code for information coming in too fast to analyze.

== Cast ==
- Arthur Hill as Dr. Jeremy Stone
- David Wayne as Dr. Charles Dutton
- James Olson as Dr. Mark Hall
- Kate Reid as Dr. Ruth Leavitt
- Paula Kelly as Nurse Karen Anson
- George Mitchell as Jackson
- Ramon Bieri as Maj. Arthur Manchek, Scoop Mission Controller
- Kermit Murdock as Dr. Robertson, White House science advisor
- Richard O'Brien as Grimes
- Peter Hobbs as General Sparks
- Eric Christmas as Senator Phillips
- Joe Di Reda as Sgt. Burk
- Carl Reidel as Lt. Comroe
- Ken Swofford as Toby
- Frances Reid as Clara Dutton
- Richard Bull as Air Force Major
- John Carter as MP Captain Morton
- Georgia Schmidt as Old Lady - Piedmont (uncredited)
- Midori Arimoto as Bess
- Robert Soto as Manuel Rios (uncredited)

In addition, source author Michael Crichton makes a cameo appearance as a physician in the scene in which Dr. Hall is pulled from surgery to report to Wildfire.

== Production ==
=== Development and writing ===
Film rights were bought by Universal Pictures for $250,000 in 1969. The cast of characters in the novel was modified for the film, including by replacing the male Dr. Peter Leavitt in the novel with the female Dr. Ruth Leavitt. Screenwriter Nelson Gidding suggested the change to Wise, who at first was not enthusiastic, as he initially pictured the female Dr. Leavitt as a largely decorative character reminiscent of Raquel Welch's character in the 1966 film Fantastic Voyage. When Gidding explained his take on Leavitt, Wise resolved the question by asking the opinion of a number of scientists, who were unanimously enthusiastic about the idea. Eventually Wise came to be very happy with the decision to make Leavitt female, feeling that Kate Reid's Dr. Leavitt was "the most interesting character" in the film.

=== Filming ===
The filming in the fictional town of Piedmont took place in Shafter, Texas, while other filming was conducted at Ocotillo Wells, California.

=== Visual effects ===
The Andromeda Strain was one of the first films to use advanced computerized photographic visual effects, with work by Douglas Trumbull, who had pioneered effects for 2001: A Space Odyssey, along with James Shourt and Albert Whitlock who worked on The Birds. Reportedly $250,000 of the film's budget of $6.5 million was used to create the special effects, including Trumbull's simulation of an electron microscope.

The film contained a faux computer rendering, created with conventional film-making processes, of a mapped 3-D view of the rotating structure of the Project Wildfire laboratory.

== Reception and legacy ==
=== Box office ===
The Andromeda Strain was a minor box office success. Produced on a relatively high budget of $6.5 million, the film grossed $12,376,563 in North America, earning $8.2 million in United States theatrical rentals. It was the 16th highest-grossing film of 1971.

=== Critical response ===
The opinion of critics is generally mixed, with some critics enjoying the film for its dedication to the original novel and with others disliking it for its drawn-out plot. At review aggregator website Rotten Tomatoes, the film has a 68% approval rating based on 44 reviews, with an average score of 6.6/10. The website's critics consensus reads: "Although its urgent subject matter warrants less a deliberate pace, The Andromeda Strain brings Michael Crichton's techno-thriller to the big screen with striking intelligence and an engrossing sense of paranoia." Metacritic, which uses a weighted average, assigned the film a score of 60 out of 100, based on 9 critics, indicating "mixed or average" reviews.

Roger Greenspun of The New York Times panned the film in the 22 March 1971 issue, calling the novel "dreadful". John Simon called The Andromeda Strain "a tidy film, yet it completely fades from memory after its 130 minutes are over."

=== Scientific response ===
A 2003 publication by the Infectious Diseases Society of America noted that The Andromeda Strain is the "most significant, scientifically accurate, and prototypic of all films of this [killer virus] genre ... it accurately details the appearance of a deadly agent, its impact, and the efforts at containing it, and, finally, the work-up on its identification and clarification on why certain persons are immune to it."

=== In other media ===
In the 1992 experimental feature Strain Andromeda The, video artist Anne McGuire re-edited the entire film shot-by-shot in reverse order of sequences.

=== Awards and nominations ===
Award	Year	Category	Nominee	Result	Ref.
Academy Awards	1972	Best Film Editing	Stuart Gilmore, John W. Holmes	Nominated	
Academy Awards	1972	Best Art Direction	Boris Leven, William H. Tuntke, Ruby R. Levitt	Nominated	
Golden Globes	1972	Best Original Score	Gil Mellé	Nominated	
Hugo Award	1972	Best Dramatic Presentation	Robert Wise, Nelson Gidding, Michael Crichton	Nominated	

== See also ==
- List of American films of 1971
- The Andromeda Strain, a 2008 television miniseries adaptation of the same novel
