= X Brands =

American actor

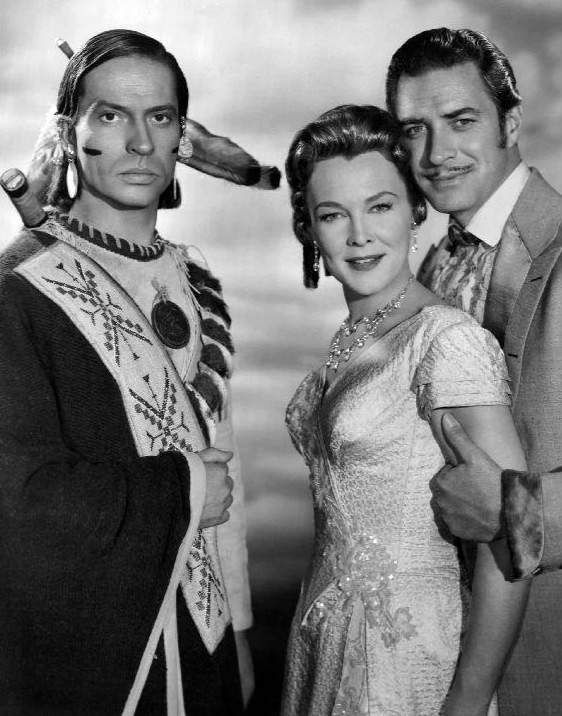
- Brands (left) with Frances Bergen and Jock Mahoney in Yancy Derringer (1959)
- Born: Jay X Brands; July 24, 1927; Kansas City, Missouri, U.S.
- Died: May 8, 2000 (aged 72); Northridge, California, U.S.
- Occupation: Actor
- Years active: 1956–1978
- Spouses: Suzan H. Edwards (m. 1946, divorced); Jean D. Merriam (m. 1950; div. 1961); Pamela M. McInnes (m. 1971; div. 1975)
- Children: 2

X Brands (July 24, 1927 – May 8, 2000), sometimes credited as "Jay X. Brands", was an American actor of German ancestry known for his roles on various television series and in some films between 1956 and the late 1970s. His best-known recurring character is Pahoo-Ka-Ta-Wah ("Wolf Who Stands In Water"), the shotgun-toting American Indian on Yancy Derringer, a 1958-1959 CBS series set in post-Civil War New Orleans and starring Jock Mahoney in the title role.

== Early life ==
Born in Kansas City, Missouri, Jay X Brands was the youngest of three children of Pansy H. (née Allen) and William G. Brands. By 1940 Jay had relocated with his family to Glendale, California, where his father worked as a general contractor. There the Brands lived only 11 miles (18 km) from Hollywood, and over time "X" became interested in film work, later finding employment as a stuntman as well as minor acting roles.

Brands' unusual use of a lone alphabetic character as a name derives from his family's history. In the small town in Germany where his ancestors once resided, there were two men named Jan Brands. One of them adopted the middle initial "X" to distinguish himself from the other Jan. He became known as "X" Brands, and the name continued to be used by his descendants who immigrated to America. In keeping with family tradition, no Brands could use the initial until the previous "X" had died.

Although X Brands was of European ancestry, his portrayals of Native Americans in film and television roles earned praise for their authenticity. Brummett Echohawk, a Pawnee Indian veteran, wrote a letter to Hollywood producers in which he commended Brands for his authentic performance and his ability to speak the tribe's language.

== Films ==
During his film career, Brands invariably served as supporting characters, often in uncredited roles, performing in at least 13 films between 1956 and 1978. His most noteworthy roles are as "Hook" in Santee, starring Glenn Ford, and as "Vallejo" in the third remake of Beau Geste (1966).

== Television ==
=== Best-known role ===
The television series Yancy Derringer stars Jock Mahoney and consists of 34 episodes, which originally aired weekly from October 1958 through June 1959. The series' storyline is set in New Orleans just after the end of the Civil War in 1865. X Brands plays Pahoo-Ka-Ta-Wah, ("Wolf Who Stands in Water"), a Pawnee Indian who carries a double-barrel shotgun and throwing knife and is Derringer's (Mahoney's) constant companion and protector. Pahoo's loyalty and overriding concern for Derringer's welfare began after he saved Yancy's life. In the series' pilot episode, "Return to New Orleans", Yancy recounts that act, explaining that by saving his life, Pahoo believes "he went against fate" and "therefore he's responsible for my life from now on." Also, throughout the series, Brands' Pawnee character is silent, never uttering a word. Whenever Yancy does speak to him, Pahoo uses only sign language—hand gestures—to communicate.

=== Other notable roles ===
In 1956, two years before he began work on Yancy Derringer, Brands appeared in different roles in 15 episodes of the syndicated Western series
Judge Roy Bean, featuring Edgar Buchanan, Jack Buetel, and Jackie Loughery. His other TV guest star appearances include series such as Crossroads, Cheyenne, Annie Oakley, Gunsmoke (1975 as a Chief in “The Squaw”), The Tall Man, Daniel Boone, Mission: Impossible, The High Chaparral, Laredo, Alias Smith and Jones, Bonanza, Wagon Train, The Rifleman, Rawhide, and Broken Arrow.

Although most of his roles were of that genre, he did not always appear as an Indian in Westerns. For instance, he appeared in the speaking role of "Yancey" in an episode of Sergeant Preston of the Yukon, a popular late '50s adventure series. Later, on the NBC espionage series, The Man from U.N.C.L.E., he portrayed, yet again, a Native American in a 1966 episode titled "The Indian Affairs Affair".

Brands can also be seen in a rare talking role as trail boss Jeb Mitchell in a 1960 episode of NBC's Bat Masterson. He has another speaking role in the ABC/Warner Brothers series, Cheyenne, in the episode, "Massacre At Gunsight Pass", portraying the Indian leader, "Powderface". He plays rogue Indian "Sharp Tongue" in a speaking role on the season six episode of Bonanza, "A Far, Far Better Thing". He has a speaking role as well in a 1970 episode of NBC's police series, Adam-12, in which he plays Officer Sanchez.

== Personal life and death ==
X Brands was married three times. On October 3, 1946, while serving as an electrician's mate in the United States Navy, he wed 16-year-old California native Suzan Harriet Edwards in Los Angeles. Though the duration of their union is undetermined, it appears to have been brief; in 1950, he married Jean Dorothy Merriam of Fort Worth, Texas. He and Merriam had two daughters, Kathleen Jean (1951-2001) and Karen Juliet (1956- ), before their marriage ended in 1961. In Los Angeles, ten years later, on August 28, 1971, Brands was married to 23-year-old Pamela M. McInnes. Los Angeles County records document that they were divorced in October 1975.

Brands died at age 72 in Northridge, California, on May 8, 2000. According to Brands' daughter Karen Juliet (Brands) Dougherty, her father's death certificate attributed his demise to sepsis, pneumonia and congestive heart failure and not to cancer as cited by some biographical references. Jay was an avid aviator and FAA Certified Instructor and Examiner.

== Filmography ==
=== Film ===
Year	Title	Role	Director	Notes
1954	Overland Pacific	Railroad Worker	Fred F. Sears	Uncredited
1955	Apache Woman	Townsman	Roger Corman	Uncredited
1956	Fury at Gunsight Pass	Townsman	Fred F. Sears	Uncredited
1956	Frontier Gambler	Gregg	Sam Newfield	Uncredited
1956	Naked Gun	Lang	Edward Drew	
1957	She Devil	First Doctor	Kurt Neumann	
1957	Band of Angels	Officer	Raoul Walsh	Uncredited
1957	Young and Dangerous	Motorcycle Cop	William F. Claxton	Uncredited
1958	Revolt in the Big House	Guard	R.G. Springsteen	Uncredited
1959	Escort West	Tago	Francis D. Lyon	
1959	Gunmen from Laredo	Delgados	Wallace MacDonald	Uncredited
1960	Oklahoma Territory	Running Cloud	Edward L. Cahn	
1966	Beau Geste	Vallejo	Douglas Heyes	
1968	Three Guns for Texas	Randoe	Earl Bellamy, David Lowell Rich, and Paul Stanley	Uncredited
1971	Captain Apache		Alexander Singer	
1973	Santee	Hook	Gary Nelson	
1978	Avalanche	Marty Brenner	Corey Allen	Final role

=== Television ===
Year	Title	Role	Notes
1952–1953	Cowboy G-Men	Henchman / Lieutenant Jennings / Lew Danning / Townsman / Man Loading Silver / Gypsy / Hotel Clerk / Various Henchman / Registrar / Jury Member / Gives Signal / Ranch Hand	11 episodes; uncredited in 7 episodes, credited as Jay X. Brands in 1 episode.
1954	Studio 57	Cafe Brawler	Episode: "No Great Hero"
1954–1955	The Adventures of Kit Carson	Henchman / Messenger / The Ambush Outlaw / Deputy / Trooper / Army Orderly	8 episodes; uncredited in 3 episodes. credited as Jay X. Brands in 2 episodes.
1955	Soldiers of Fortune	Prison Guard / Sniper	2 episodes; uncredited
1955–1956	Judge Roy Bean	Henchman Buck / Stage Driver / Dallas / Stage Driver Jonas / Danning / George Hackett / Grad Grover / Hickey / Jim Brown / Ben Logan / Klondike / Tyler / Henchman Curly / Daniels / Reverend Walter Cable / Dan Wiler	16 episodes; uncredited in 1 episode, credited as Jay X. Brands in 4 episodes.
1956	Buffalo Bill, Jr.	Henchman / Kansas / Dave Gates	4 episodes
1956	Crossroads	Ball Player	Episode: "The Comeback"
1956	Annie Oakley	Peter Maher / Tenanda / Randy	3 episodes
1956–1958	The Adventures of Rin Tin Tin	Cochise / Brave Bow / Angry Fox	4 episodes
1957	26 Men	Ranger Joe Pierce	Episode: "Violent Land"; credited as X Brand
1957	Tales of the 77th Bengal Lancers		Episode: "Ten Thousand Rupees"
1957	The Silent Service	Helmsman	Episode: "The End of the Line"
1957	Circus Boy	Henchman / Jake	2 episodes; uncredited
1957	Tales of the Texas Rangers	Johnnie Tyce	Episode: "Whirlwind Raiders"
1957	Casey Jones	Louis Lacero	Episode: "A Badge for Casey"
1957	Death Valley Days	Jack Donovan	Episode: "Fifty Years a Mystery"
1957	The Adventures of Jim Bowie	Newt	Episode: "The Pearls of Talimerco"; credited as X. Brand
1957–1958	Sergeant Preston of the Yukon	Yancey / Metka Joe	2 episodes
1957–1961	The Life and Legend of Wyatt Earp	Deputy Ted / 1st Apache / Deputy / Cowboy Warning Doc	7 episodes; uncredited in 6 episodes
1957–1961	Tales of Wells Fargo	Brock / Spotted Tail / Finnley	3 episodes; credited as X Brand in 1 episode
1958	Broken Arrow	Nicaro	Episode: "The Duel"
1958	Zorro	Courier	Episode: "The Eagle's Brood"; uncredited
1958	Maverick	First Sioux Indian / Indian	2 episodes; uncredited
1958–1959	Yancy Derringer	Pahoo-Ka-Ta-Wah	34 episodes
1958–1961	Cheyenne	Indian Messenger / Powder Face / Apache Brave	3 episodes; uncredited in 1 episode
1958–1962	Wagon Train	Tulo / 1st Indian Brave / Indian Renegade Leader / Broken Finger / Little Horse	5 episodes
1959	Special Agent 7	Parisi	Episode: "The Inside Man"
1959	Northwest Passage	Indian	Episode: "Trial by Fire"
1960	Bat Masterson	Jeb Mitchell	Episode: "Masterson's Arcadia Club"
1960–1961	Rawhide	1st Indian Brave / Indian Leader / Kah-Wah	3 episodes
1961	The Tall Man	Dave Rudabaugh	Episode: "Rovin' Gambler"
1961	The Rifleman	Pretty Man Longden	Episode: "The Clarence Bibs Story"
1961	Rawhide	1st Indian Brave	S3:E22, "Incident in the Middle of Nowhere"
1962	Laramie	Skenya	Episode: "Day of the Savage"
1964–1968	The Virginian	Commanche Lookout / The 3rd Gunman / Raven Wing	3 episodes
1965	Bonanza	Sharp Tongue	Episode: "The Far, Far Better Thing"
1965	Branded	Red Arm	Episode: "One Way Out"
1965–1966	Laredo	First Indian Chief / Randoe / Blue Dog	3 episodes; uncredited in 1 episode
1966	The Man from U.N.C.L.E.	Indian	Episode: "The Indian Affairs Affair"
1966	Shane	Young Brave	Episode: "High Road to Viator"
1966–1968	Daniel Boone	Spokesman / Tall Deer	2 episodes
1967	Iron Horse	Juanito	Episode: "The Bridge at Forty Mile"
1967	The Monroes	Two Pipes	Episode: "Ghosts of Paradox"
1967	Custer	Red Wolf	Episode: "Desperate Mission"
1967	Hondo	Coro / Indian Tracker	2 episodes; uncredited in 1 episode
1967–1970	The High Chaparral	Tularosa / Nock-Ay-Del	4 episodes
1968–1975	Gunsmoke	Renegade #1 / Red Willow / Chief / Renegade Indian / Singleton	7 episodes
1969	Here Come the Brides	Johnny Wolf	Episode: "The Deadly Trade"
1970	Here's Lucy	Lefty Logan	Episode: "Lucy and Wally Cox"
1970	Adam-12	Officer Sanchez	Episode: "Log 74: Light Duty"
1971	Bearcats!	Mantano	Episode: "Blood Knot"
1972	Mission: Impossible	Barsi	Episode: "Trapped"
1972	Alias Smith and Jones	Roberts / Poker Player	2 episodes
1973	Emergency!	Captain-Engine Co. 81	Episode: "Alley Cat"
1973	Cannon	Louie Grey Wolf	Episode: "Valley of the Damned"
1976	Bridger	Crow Chief	TV movie
1979	Beach Patrol	1st Officer	TV movie
