= Rose of Cimarron (film) =

1952 American film by Harry Keller

- Original film poster
- Directed by: Harry Keller
- Written by: Maurice Geraghty
- Produced by: Edward L. Alperson
- Starring: Mala Powers; Jack Beutel; Bill Williams
- Cinematography: Karl Struss
- Edited by: Arthur Roberts
- Music by: Raoul Kraushaar; Edward L. Alperson Jr. Mort Glickman
- Color process: Cinecolor (as Natural Color)
- Production companies: Johnar Film Productions; Edward L. Alperson Productions
- Distributed by: 20th Century Fox
- Release date: January 28, 1952
- Running time: 72 minutes
- Country: United States
- Language: English

Rose of Cimarron is a 1952 American Western film produced by Edward L. Alperson for 20th Century Fox. Despite the title, it has nothing to do with Rose Dunn the actual "Rose of Cimarron". The film is a revenge Western with a twist: the protagonist is a woman raised by the Cherokee avenging her parents who were murdered by whites.

== Plot ==
When a covered wagon heading for California is attacked by Comanche, the only survivor is a baby girl. A young Cherokee brave finds her and brings her to his parents where she is raised as a Cherokee but with intimate knowledge of the language and customs of white Americans. She is named Rose of Cimarron after a mountain lion.

Rose's pleasant life ends when a sheriff's posse arrives at her adopted parents' ranch. They are searching for three bank robbers and ask Lone Eagle's advice of which route would take the bank robbers out of the badlands. Rose and her brother Willie know the area due to their trapping and guide the sheriff and his men there. As soon as they leave the three bank robbers come out of hiding and demand Lone Eagle and his wife sell or trade fresh horses to them. When they refuse they murder the both of them.

Rose straps on a pair of six guns and a knife to avenge her parents. Though she has not witnessed the murders she can identify the horses the killers have stolen, a skewbald, a palomino and a sorrel. Arriving in town Rose demands the town marshal apprehend and hang the murderers. The marshal offers to perform his duty within the law but advises Rose that sometimes even the law can fail. Rose promises that if the law fails, she won't.

Rose acquires a room in a boarding house without realising the man who offers it to her, George Newcombe, is one of the murderers. With the law taking its time Rose identifies two of the murderers by their mounts. When she questions them the two move away but she draws her six-guns and shoots them dead. Despite the plea of self-defence, Rose is locked up where she meets Deacon, an elderly criminal with a plan for a bullion robbery. George and his new accomplices free Deacon and Rose from jail. On the trail escaping from the law, Rose and George gradually discover each is out to kill the other.

== Cast ==
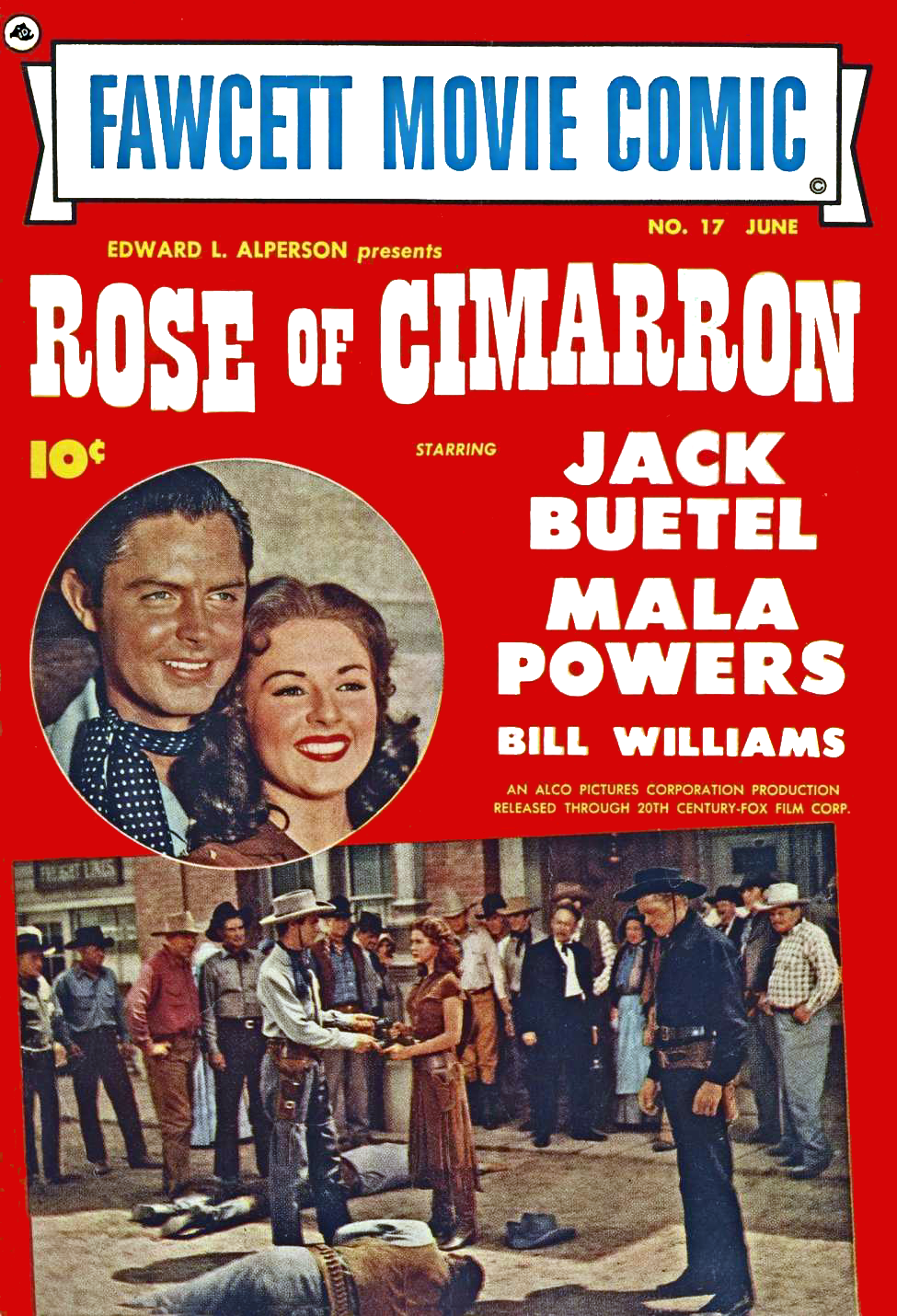
Fawcett Movie Comic for Rose of Cimarron (1952)

- Mala Powers as Rose of Cimarron
- Jack Buetel as Marshal Hollister
- Bill Williams as George Newcomb
- Jim Davis as Willie Whitewater
- Dick Curtis as Clem Dawley
- Lane Bradford as Mike Finch
- William Phipps as Jeb Dawley
- Bob Steele as Rio
- Alex Gerry as Judge Kirby
- Lillian Bronson as Emmy Anders
- Art Smith as Deacon
- Monte Blue as Lone Eagle
- Argentina Brunetti as Red Fawn
- Irving Bacon as Sheriff
- Tom Monroe as Townsman
- George Chandler as Deputy Sheriff
- John Doucette as Henchman
- Tommy Cook as Willie, as a Boy
- William Schallert as Gold Bullion Guard
- Wade Crosby as Henchman
- Kenneth MacDonald as Posse Sheriff
- Byron Foulger as Townsman

== Production ==
Both Mala Powers and Jack Buetel were borrowed from Howard Hughes who had both under a personal contract. Outdoor scenes were filmed in Topanga Canyon.

Though she had only ever ridden ponies and fired cap pistols, Powers was convincingly trained for several weeks in riding at the Ace Hudkins stables and in fast draws and weapons use by ace stuntmen Tom Steele and David Sharpe. The only scene she was doubled in was when stuntwoman Polly Burson climbed from a galloping horse onto a moving train.

== Quotes ==
All they have for us is a quick trial, a brief verdict and a short rope - Deacon
