= Jarrett (film) =

- Written by: Richard Maibaum
- Directed by: Barry Shear
- Starring: Glenn Ford; Anthony Quayle
- Country of origin: United States
- Original language: English

Production
- Editors: John W. Holmes; David Wages
- Running time: 73 minutes
- Production companies: David Gerber Productions; Screen Gems

Original release
- Network: NBC
- Release: March 17, 1973

Jarrett is a 1973 American television film which aired on NBC, directed by Barry Shear and starring Glenn Ford as an investigator who specializes in art cases. A feature-length pilot, it was envisioned as a weekly series, but the network did not pick it up.

== Background ==
Glenn Ford had recently starred in Western drama Cade's County, and its executive producer David Gerber wanted to work with Ford again and pitched it to NBC. Jarrett was intended to be a comedy-mystery series akin to James Bond films, and the filmmakers recruited Bond scriptwriter Richard Maibaum for its script. Ford did his own stunts for the film.

== Plot ==
Sam Jarrett, a middleweight boxing champion turned globe-trotting private detective, specializes in art crimes. He is tasked with tracking down the missing Book of Adam and Eve, a collection of rare biblical papyrus scrolls stolen from a museum. His nemesis is Cosmo Bastrop, a comic book enthusiast who owns a private island and brags about his large collection of obscure comics. Bastrop also wants the scrolls, and antagonizes Jarrett throughout the film to get them, at one point trapping Jarrett's bed with a cobra.

A traveling preacher, Vocal Simpson, claims to own the scrolls and has built a religious practice about the salacious behavior within them. Jarrett attends one of his revivals, in which his assistant Luluwa portrays Eve while dancing naked with a snake. However, Bastrop is there too, claiming to be a filmmaker who wants to buy the rights to the book. After Jarrett exposes him, his henchmen attempt to kidnap Luluwa.

Jarrett meets another woman, Sigrid Larsen, who says that her father discovered the scrolls but does not remember their location. Bastrop steals her father's frame bed in an attempt to seize the treasure. Luluwa receives the scrolls and gives them to Jarrett, but testing seems to indicate that they were counterfeited. However, Jarrett and Larsen realize that Bastrop had arranged that Simpson and Luluwa would receive the scrolls, and that the test was a hoax. Jarrett invades Bastrop's island and finds the scrolls amid his much-bragged-about comic collection.

== Cast ==
- Glenn Ford as Sam Jarrett
- Anthony Quayle as Cosmo Bastrop
- Forrest Tucker as Rev. Vocal Simpson
- Richard Anderson as Spencer Loomis
- Yvonne Craig as Luluwa
- Elliott Montgomery as Dr. Carey
- Laraine Stephens as Sigrid Larsen
- Jody Gilbert as Sawyer

== See also ==
- List of American films of 1973
