= Camera Obscura (journal) =

- Discipline: Media studies
- Language: English
- Edited by: Lalitha Gopalan, Lynne Joyrich, Homay King, Constance Penley, Tess Takahashi, Patricia White, Sharon Willis

Publication details
- History: 1976–present
- Publisher: Duke University Press (United States)
- Frequency: Triannual

Standard abbreviations
- ISO 4: Camera Obscura

Indexing
- ISSN: 0270-5346 (print); 1529-1510 (web)
- LCCN: 86642435
- OCLC no.: 983213062

Links
- Journal homepage; Online archive

Camera Obscura is a triannual peer-reviewed academic journal of feminism, culture, and media studies that has operated as a feminist editorial collective out of the University of California since the 1970s, and is published by Duke University Press. The editors-in-chief are Lalitha Gopalan, Lynne Joyrich, Homay King, Constance Penley, Tess Takahashi, Patricia White, Sharon Willis.

== History ==
Camera Obscura was established in 1976 by four graduate students at the University of California, Berkeley: Janet Bergstrom, Sandy Flitterman-Lewis, Elisabeth Lyon, and Constance Penley. The four had contributed to Women & Film magazine, but departed seeking to create a collectively edited journal that engaged with the contemporary critical theory. As Penley recounts, their intention was based on the view that the "analytical tools of structuralism, semiotics, and psychoanalysis could help us give a better description and explanation of the cinematic system that we wanted to counter."

== Abstracting and indexing ==
The journal is abstracted and indexed in:

- Arts and Humanities Citation Index
- Current Contents/Arts & Humanities
- DIALNET
- EBSCO databases
- Index Islamicus
- International Bibliography of Periodical Literature
- Modern Language Association Database
- ProQuest databases
- Scopus

== See also ==
- List of film periodicals
