= Trail Guide =

1952 film by Lesley Selander

- Directed by: Lesley Selander
- Written by: William Lively
- Screenplay by: Arthur E. Orloff
- Produced by: Herman Schlom
- Starring: Tim Holt; Richard Martin; Linda Douglas
- Cinematography: Nicholas Musuraca
- Edited by: Samuel E. Beetley
- Music by: Paul Sawtell
- Production company: RKO Radio Pictures
- Distributed by: RKO Radio Pictures
- Release date: February 13, 1952 (US)
- Running time: 60 minutes
- Country: United States
- Language: English
- Budget: $89,000

Trail Guide is a 1952 American Western film directed by Lesley Selander and starring Tim Holt, Richard Martin and Linda Douglas . Distributed by RKO Pictures, it lost $20,000.

== Plot ==
In the Old West, Tim Holt and his sidekick, Chito Rafferty, are trail guides for a group of homesteaders. As the homesteaders near their destination, Tim and Chito depart for the nearby town of Silver Springs to look for jobs as cowhands. En route, they are shot at by cattle rancher Kenny Masters who, along with his sister, Peg Masters, tells them homesteaders are not welcome. Tim and Chito deny they are homesteaders. Arriving in town, Tim looks for work while Chito flirts with a saloon girl who happens to be Kenny's girlfriend. Saloon owner, Regan, breaks up a fight between Kenny and Chito; and, after Chito departs, it is revealed Kenny hired Regan to steal the homesteaders' claims to prevent them from settling in the area. Tim and Chito see a gang of men suspiciously depart town, and follow them. The gang accost Wheeler, the homesteaders' wagon master, and rob him of the homesteaders' claim papers and money. Wheeler can't identify the gang who were masked. Tim and Chito find a gun at the scene and head to the Masters' cattle ranch to question them about the assault on Wheeler. The Masters deny any involvement. Tim and Chito head to town to find the marshal.

Kenny asks Peg for some of their deceased father's money but refuses to tell her why. Kenny heads to Regan's saloon where Tim and Chito observe him gambling. Tim accuses Kenny of gambling the homesteaders' money and asks if the gun they found is his. Kenny denies the accusations. Regan's men pick a fight with Tim in the bar, in order to retrieve the gun Tim found, but are unsuccessful. Tim and Chito are pursued by Regan's gang but get away.

Tim and Chito return to the homesteaders' caravan and, surprisingly, find Peg Masters treating Wheeler's injuries. Peg says she is willing to negotiate with the other cattle ranchers to allow the homesteaders to stay. She denies the gun belongs to Kenny. Tim and Chito return to town and discover the marshal has been killed. Tim concludes the ownership of the gun is a bigger issue than the disagreement between the ranchers and homesteaders.

Peg arrives back at the Masters' ranch to find Kenny packing to leave, not knowing Regan and his henchman, Dawson, have been there to threaten him. Tim and Chito intercept Kenny. Kenny starts to tell them the truth, but is shot and killed by Dawson, who is lying in wait with Regan. Tim chases Dawson. Regan confronts Chito as he tends to Kenny's body. Returning to the Masters' ranch, Regan tells Peg that Chito killed her brother, causing Peg to turn against the homesteaders. Peg leaves with Regan while Chito is held captive at the ranch.

Meanwhile, Tim heads to Regan's saloon and subdues Dawson. Dawson attempts to grab a gun from Regan's desk drawer, and in doing so, reveals the location of the homesteaders' claim papers implicating Regan. Meanwhile, Chito escapes, finds Tim at the saloon; and, he and Tim, with Dawson, arrive at the Masters' ranch, where Peg and Regan have returned. Tim reveals to Peg that Dawson, not Chito, killed Kenny. Regan attempts escape, but is subdued.

The homesteaders arrive in town and Peg offers Tim and Chito jobs. Chito refuses to stay, afraid that Maria, a homesteader to whom he is attracted, will pressure him into marriage. Tim leaves as well, saying he needs to keep Chito out of trouble.

== Cast ==
- Tim Holt as Tim Holt
- Richard Martin as Chito Rafferty
- Linda Douglas as Peg Masters
- Frank Wilcox as Regan
- Robert Sherwood as Kenny Masters
- John Pickard as Dawson (henchman)
- Kenneth MacDonald as Wheeler (wagon master)
- Wendy Waldron as Maria
- Patricia Wright as Saloon Girl
- Tom London as Old Timer
- John Merton as Dale
