= Stuart Gilmore =

American film editor and film director (1909–1971)

- Born: March 8, 1909; Tombstone, Arizona, US
- Died: November 19, 1971 (aged 62); Los Angeles, California, US
- Occupations: Film editor and director
- Years active: 1927–1971
- Children: William S. Gilmore

Stuart Gilmore (March 8, 1909 – November 19, 1971) was an American film editor who had over 45 editing credits along with 10 directing credits. He was nominated for three Academy Awards with the last nomination being posthumous.

== Career ==
Gilmore joined Paramount Pictures in 1927 and started editing films in 1934. He worked there until 1945. He joined RKO in 1950 and moved to 20th Century Fox in 1957, where he worked for two years. He was working at Universal Pictures when he died from a heart attack.

He received three nominations for the Academy Award for Best Film Editing:

- 33rd Academy Awards – Nominated for The Alamo. Lost to The Apartment.
- 43rd Academy Awards – Nominated for Airport. Lost to Patton.
- 44th Academy Awards –Nominated for The Andromeda Strain, nomination shared with John W. Holmes. Lost to The French Connection.

== Personal life ==
He was married to Audrey and had a son, Wiliam.

== Selected filmography ==
=== As an editor ===
- The Andromeda Strain (1971)
- Airport (1970)
- Sweet Charity (1969)
- Yours, Mine and Ours (1968)
- Rosie! (1967)
- Thoroughly Modern Millie (1967)
- Hawaii (1966)
- Red Line 7000 (1965)
- Toys in the Attic (1963)
- Hatari! (1962)
- Two for the Seesaw (1962)
- The Alamo (1960)
- Journey to the Center of the Earth (1959)
- Holiday for Lovers (1959)
- The Sound and the Fury (1959)
- Stage Struck (1958)
- The Barbarian and the Geisha (1958)
- The Hunters (1958)
- The Enemy Below (1957)
- The Conqueror (1956)
- Underwater! (1955)
- Vendetta (1950)
- Road to Utopia (1945)
- Out of This World (1945)
- Hail the Conquering Hero (1944)
- The Miracle of Morgan's Creek (1944)
- The Hour Before the Dawn (1944)
- The Palm Beach Story (1942)
- The Lady Eve (1941)
- Sullivan's Travels (1941)
- Arrest Bulldog Drummond (1939)

=== As a director ===
- Captive Women (1952)
- The Half-Breed (1952)
- Target (1952)
- Hot Lead (1951)
- The Virginian (1946)

== See also ==
- List of posthumous Academy Award winners and nominees
