= The Half-Breed (1952 film) =

1952 film by Stuart Gilmore

- Directed by: Stuart Gilmore
- Screenplay by: Harold Shumate; Richard Wormser; Charles Hoffman
- Story by: Robert Hardy Andrews
- Produced by: Herman Schlom; Irving Starr
- Starring: Robert Young
- Cinematography: William V. Skall
- Edited by: Samuel E. Beetley
- Music by: Paul Sawtell
- Color process: Technicolor
- Production company: RKO Radio Pictures
- Distributed by: RKO Radio Pictures
- Release date: May 4, 1952
- Running time: 81 minutes
- Country: United States
- Language: English

The Half-Breed is a 1952 American Western film directed by Stuart Gilmore, written by Harold Shumate, Richard Wormser and Charles Hoffman and starring Robert Young, Janis Carter, Jack Buetel, Barton MacLane, Reed Hadley and Porter Hall. The film was released on May 4, 1952 by RKO Radio Pictures.

== Plot ==
The Apache Indians near the town of San Remo, Arizona are subject to exploitation by local whites and a corrupt U.S. Indian agent. Charlie Wolf, an Indian of partial European ancestry, tries to lead his people during difficult times. Dan Craig is a gambler who becomes involved in negotiations between Wolf and the townspeople, who fear an Apache attack. There are rumors of gold in the ground under the Apache reservation.

== Cast ==
- Robert Young as Dan Craig
- Janis Carter as Helen Dowling
- Jack Buetel as Charlie Wolf
- Barton MacLane as Marshal Cassidy
- Reed Hadley as Frank Crawford
- Porter Hall as Kraemer
- Connie Gilchrist as Ma Higgins
- Sammy White as Willy Wayne
- Damian O'Flynn as Capt. Jackson
- Frank Wilcox as Sands
- Judy Walsh as Nah-Lin
- Tom Monroe as Russell
