= Best of the Badmen =

1951 film by William D. Russell

- Film poster
- Directed by: William D. Russell
- Written by: Robert Hardy Andrews
- Screenplay by: John Twist
- Produced by: Samuel Bischoff
- Starring: Robert Ryan; Claire Trevor; Jack Buetel; Walter Brennan; Lawrence Tierney
- Cinematography: Edward Cronjager
- Edited by: Desmond Marquette
- Music by: Paul Sawtell
- Distributed by: RKO Radio Pictures
- Release date: June 9, 1951
- Running time: 84 minutes
- Country: United States
- Language: English

Best of the Badmen is a 1951 Western film directed by William D. Russell and starring Robert Ryan, Claire Trevor and Robert Preston. Its plot involves the notorious James–Younger Gang of 19th century Missouri.

== Plot ==
Jeff Clanton, an Army major from Missouri, captures the survivors of the Confederacy's Quantrill's Raiders and convinces them to surrender and pledge their allegiance to the Union. Clanton pledges that they will be paroled, but Matthew Fowler, a carpetbagger who owns a powerful detective agency, is determined to arrest them for the reward. Fowler's deputy wounds one of the captives and is killed in the return fire. Clanton is unjustly arrested for murdering Fowler's deputy, tried by a kangaroo court and sentenced to be hanged the following morning. He escapes that night and leads the band of outlaws including Jesse James and the Younger brothers in a vendetta against Fowler's detective agency.

== Cast ==
- Robert Ryan as Jeff Clanton
- Claire Trevor as Lily
- Jack Buetel as Bob Younger
- Robert Preston as Matthew Fowler
- Walter Brennan as 'Doc' Butcher
- Bruce Cabot as Cole Younger
- John Archer as Curley Ringo
- Lawrence Tierney as Jesse James
- Barton MacLane as Joad
- Tom Tyler as Frank James
- Robert J. Wilke as Jim Younger
- John Cliff as John Younger
- Lee MacGregor as Lieutenant Blaine
- Emmett Lynn as Oscar
- Carleton Young as Wilson

== Production ==
Parts of the film were shot in Paria, Johnson Canyon, Strawberry Valley, the Gap and Kanab Canyon in Utah.
