= Affair with a Stranger =

1953 film by Roy Rowland

- Theatrical release poster
- Directed by: Roy Rowland
- Written by: Richard Flournoy
- Based on: story by Richard Flournoy
- Produced by: Robert Sparks; Howard Hughes (uncredited)
- Starring: Jean Simmons; Victor Mature; Mary Jo Tarola; Monica Lewis; Jane Darwell; Dabbs Greer; Olive Carey
- Cinematography: Harry J. Wild
- Edited by: George Amy
- Music by: Sam Coslow; Roy Webb
- Distributed by: RKO Radio Pictures
- Release date: June 20, 1953 (US)
- Running time: 87 minutes
- Country: United States
- Language: English

Affair with a Stranger is a 1953 American comedy-drama directed by Roy Rowland and starring Jean Simmons and Victor Mature. It was originally to be released as Kiss and Run.

The film centres on the rumoured marital troubles of a successful playwright. As various people who came into contact with the couple reminisce about the couple's past, the story of the relationship and the budding affair that is potentially destroying it is told through a series of flashbacks.

The film received mixed reviews.

== Plot ==
On a train, playwright Bill Blakeley (Victor Mature) fends off the romantic flirtations of Janet Boothe (Monica Lewis), an actress from his play. But, when wife Carolyn (Jean Simmons) decides not to join him, Bill makes a dinner date with Janet, who plants a story with a gossip columnist about the Blakeleys possibly heading for a divorce.

Friends and acquaintances begin recalling how the couple met. Carolyn Parker was a fashion model who bought a Toledo, Ohio, newspaper each day. Bill pretended to be from Toledo as well to get to know her, only to learn that Carolyn's actually from England and has been buying the papers for a neighbor.

After their marriage, Bill's struggles to find work, combined with his gambling, force Carolyn to support them. He finally takes a job as a waiter and slips a copy of a manuscript to a customer, a producer who makes Bill's play a success.

One night, Carolyn must miss the opening of a play because she is having a baby. The child dies, and she can have no more. Bill is as supportive in her hour of need as she had been in his.

Concerned that he might be vulnerable to an ambitious actress, however, Carolyn takes the next train to New York. She runs into Bill at the station and into his arms. They both deny leaking the information. Bill realizes the trains are leaving and talks to the station master. Meanwhile, Carolyn looks at the hanky she used to wipe her tears. It has lipstick on it. As Bill returns to tell her there are no more trains and they will have to find a hotel, she drops the hanky into the garbage.

== Cast ==
- Victor Mature as Bill Blakeley
- Jean Simmons as Carolyn Parker
- Monica Lewis as Janet Boothe
- Jane Darwell as Ma Stanton
- Linda Douglas as Dolly Murray
- Dabbs Greer as Happy Murray
- Wally Vernon as Joe, Taxi Driver
- Nicholas Joy as Producer George W. Craig
- Olive Carey as Cynthia Craig
- Victoria Horne as Mrs. Wallace
- Lillian Bronson as Miss Crutcher
- George Cleveland as Pop
- Billy Chapin as Timmy

== Production ==
Victor Mature was going to star in Split Second. However he assigned to this instead and production on Split Second was pushed back. Filming started 9 July 1952 and papers reported it being "rushed before the cameras".

The original title was Break up. This was changed to Kiss and Run in April 1953 before becoming Affair with a Stranger.

The film was the fourth Jean Simmons made for Howard Hughes and RKO. Simmons and her husband Stewart Granger sued Hughes to get out of the contract. It settled out of court. Part of the final arrangement was she would do this film for no extra money. Also, Simmons agreed to make three more movies under the auspices of RKO, but not actually at that studio – she would be loaned out. She would make an additional picture for 20th Century Fox while RKO got the services of Victor Mature for one film. (Simmons and Mature would team two other times, on Fox's enormously popular The Robe and in The Egyptian)

Olive Carey, widow of Harry Carey, had a small role. Steve Rowland, son of director Roy Rowland, made his debut in the film.

== Reception ==
The Los Angeles Times called the story "quite ordinary" and said the film "can't seem to make up its mind if it's comedy or drama." Bosley Crowther of The New York Times called it "a virtual collection of cliches".
