= Jesse James' Women =

1954 film by Don Red" Barry""

- Directed by: Don "Red" Barry (as Donald Barry)
- Screenplay by: William R. Cox (as William Cox); Don "Red" Barry (as Donald Barry)
- Based on: Don "Red" Barry (as Donald Barry); T.V. Garraway; Lloyd Royal
- Produced by: Don "Red" Barry (as Donald Barry)
- Starring: Don "Red" Barry; Peggie Castle; Jack Buetel; Lita Baron
- Cinematography: Kenneth Peach
- Edited by: Barton Hayes
- Music by: Walter Greene
- Production company: Panorama
- Distributed by: United Artists
- Release date: 4 September 1954
- Running time: 84 minutes
- Country: United States
- Language: English
- Budget: $138,000
- Box office: $2,600,000

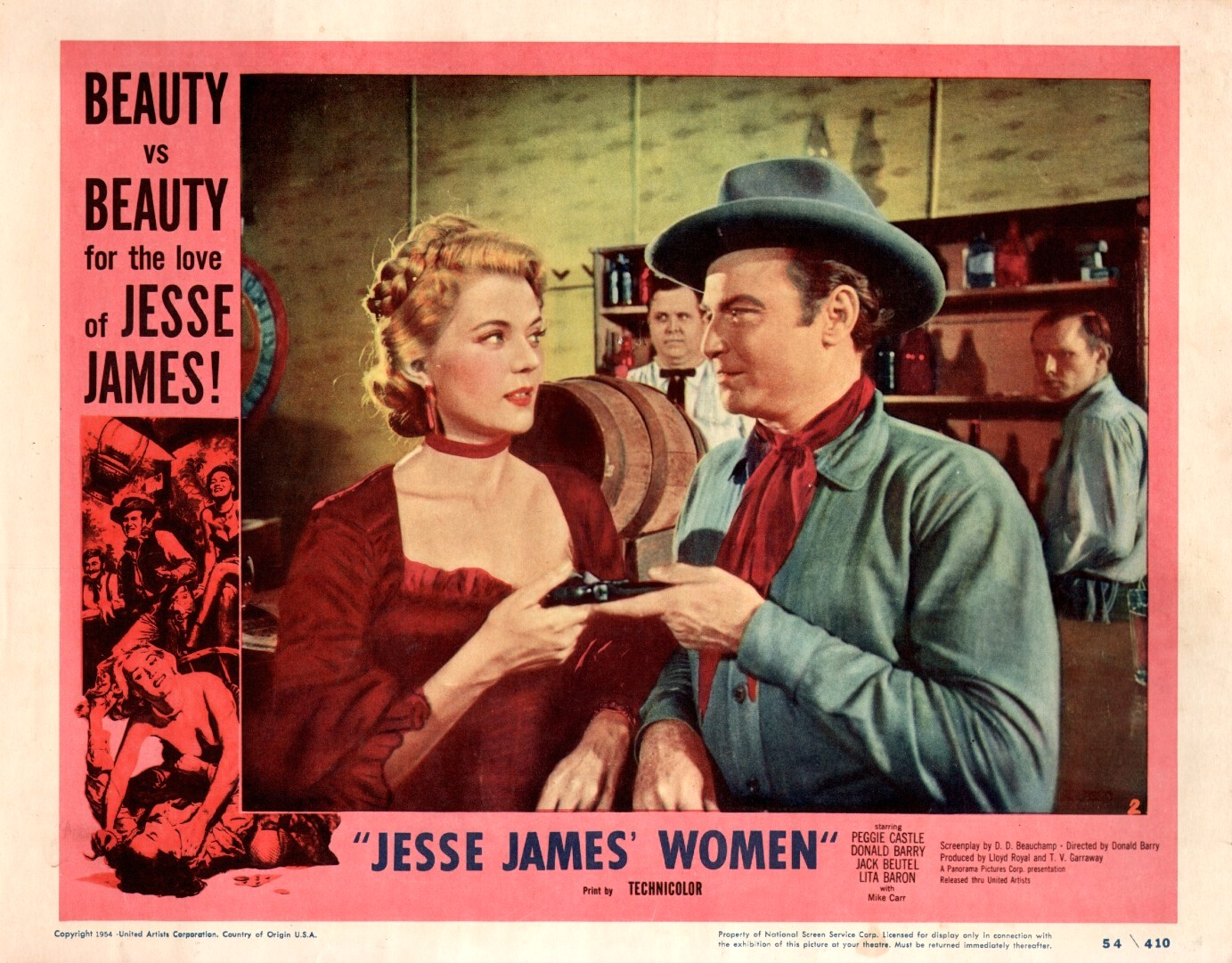
Theatrical poster

Jesse James' Women is a 1954 American Technicolor Western film starring as well as directed, co-produced and co-written by Don "Red" Barry, who portrays Jesse James. The supporting cast features Peggie Castle and Jack Buetel. Filming took place in Silver Creek, Mississippi.

== Plot summary ==
Jesse James is posing as a rancher whilst his gang is laying low. He uses various women to plan his robberies.

== Cast ==
- Don "Red" Barry as Jesse James (as Donald Barry)
- Peggie Castle as Waco Gans
- Jack Buetel as Frank James
- Lita Baron as Delta
- Michael Carr as Bob Ford (as Mike Carr)
- Joyce Barrett as Caprice Clark
- Sam Keller as Cole Younger
- Betty Brueck as Cattle Kate Kennedy
- James Clayton as Cameo Jane (as Cully Abrell)
- Laura Lea as Angel Botts
- Alton Hillman as Champ O'Toole (as Al Hillman)
- Curtis Dossett as Banker Clark (as Curtiss Dossert)
- Jimmie Hammons as Sheriff Clem Botts
- Mac McAllister as Ace, O'Toole's Manager
- Frank Cunningham as Pete
- Joan Geiger as Can-can dancer

== Soundtrack ==
- Don "Red" Barry - "Careless Lover" (Music and lyrics by George Antheil)
- "In the Shadows of My Heart" (Written by Stan Jones)
