= Target (1952 film) =

1952 film

- Theatrical release poster
- Directed by: Stuart Gilmore
- Written by: Norman Houston
- Produced by: Herman Schlom
- Starring: Tim Holt; Mary Jo Tarola; Walter Reed
- Narrated by: Tim Holt
- Cinematography: J. Roy Hunt
- Edited by: George C. Shrader
- Music by: Paul Sawtell
- Distributed by: RKO Pictures
- Release date: April 11, 1952 (U.S.)
- Running time: 61 minutes
- Country: United States
- Language: English

Target is a 1952 American Western film directed by Stuart Gilmore and starring Tim Holt.

== Plot ==
In 1893 Pecos, Texas, two cowhands join forces with a lady marshal. The town is surprised when the new marshal they hired, "Terry Moran", turns out to be the daughter of the famous lawman, of the same name, whom they thought they were hiring. The "petticoat marshal" proves her competence, deputizes the cowhands, and help protect landowner Bailey from the depredations of manipulative businessman Conroy and his gang.

== Cast ==
- Tim Holt as Tim Holt
- Mary Jo Tarola as Terry Moran (as Linda Douglas)
- Walter Reed as Martin Conroy
- Harry Harvey as Editor David Carson
- John Hamilton as Rancher Bailey
- Lane Bradford as Henchman Garrett
- Riley Hill as Henchman Foster
- Mike Ragan as Henchman Higgins
- Richard Martin as Chito Rafferty
