= The Outlaw =

1943 film by Howard Hughes

- Theatrical release poster
- Directed by: Howard Hughes (Note: Though sometimes listed as an uncredited co-director, none of the footage shot by Howard Hawks during the first two weeks of production with Lucien Ballard remains in the finished film.)
- Written by: Jules Furthman
- Produced by: Howard Hughes
- Starring: Jack Buetel; Jane Russell; Walter Huston; Thomas Mitchell
- Cinematography: Gregg Toland
- Edited by: Wallace Grissell
- Music by: Victor Young
- Production company: Howard Hughes Productions
- Distributed by: Hughes (original release); United Artists (1946 release); RKO Radio Pictures
- Release dates: February 5, 1943 (San Francisco); March 1946 (Re-release)
- Running time: 121 minutes (original release); 115 minutes (1946 release)
- Country: United States
- Language: English
- Budget: $3,400,000
- Box office: $20 million

Link to watch The Outlaw

The Outlaw is a 1943 American Western film directed by Howard Hughes and starring Jack Buetel, Jane Russell, Thomas Mitchell and Walter Huston. Hughes produced the film, replacing original director Howard Hawks with himself, and replacing original cinematographer Lucien Ballard with Gregg Toland. The film is Russell's breakthrough role to becoming a sex symbol and Hollywood movie star. Later advertising for the film billed Russell as the sole star. The Outlaw is an early example of a psychological Western.

== Plot ==
Sheriff Pat Garrett welcomes his friend Doc Holliday to Lincoln, New Mexico. Doc is looking for his stolen horse, only to find the strawberry roan in the possession of Billy the Kid, who says he bought it from someone else. They spar over it, yet take a liking to each other, much to Garrett's disgust. Doc still tries to steal his horse back late that night, but Billy is waiting and foils him.

Billy then decides to sleep in the barn, only to be shot at. He overpowers his ambusher, the willful Rio McDonald, Doc's love interest. She is out to avenge her brother, slain by the Kid, and next tries to stab Billy with a pitchfork, but he overpowers and rapes her.

The next day, a stranger offers to shoot Garrett in the back while the Kid distracts the lawman, but Billy suspects a trap and guns the man down in self-defense. There are no witnesses, and Garrett tries to arrest Billy, only to have Doc take Billy's side. As the pair attempt to leave, Garrett shoots Billy. Doc blasts the rifle out of Garrett's hand, kills two deputies, and holds off a third.

Doc flees with Billy to the home of Rio and her aunt, Guadalupe. With a posse after them, Doc leaves Billy and rides away. Instead of killing the unconscious Kid, Rio is now drawn to him and nurses him back to health over the next month, even climbing in bed with him when he becomes chilled. By the time Doc returns, Rio has fallen in love with Billy, and claims to have secretly married the still delirious gunslinger. Doc is furious that Billy has stolen first his horse and now his girlfriend. After Doc simmers down, the Kid gives him a choice: the horse or Rio. To Billy's annoyance, Doc picks the horse. Angered that both men prefer the animal over her, Rio secretly fills their canteens with sand. The two men ride off together.

On the trail, they are pursued by Garrett. The pair surmise that Rio tipped off the sheriff. Billy leaves in the night to confront her. Garrett arrives and captures a sleeping Doc and holds him prisoner.

Before the two men can depart, they find that Billy has left Rio tied nearby, in sight of water, in revenge. Suspecting that Billy loves Rio and will return to free her, Garrett waits. Billy does come back and is captured.

On the way back to town, they are surrounded by hostile Mescaleros. In a desperate situation, Garrett reluctantly frees his prisoners and returns their guns, after Billy promises to surrender his revolvers if they escape, but Doc evades making such a promise. They manage to elude the Indians, and Doc balks at giving his guns back. The foursome continue on together, away from Lincoln.

Later that night, Doc seeks to leave with the contested horse, but Billy protests. The two men decide to duel, which Garrett expects Billy to lose. However, as they await the signal to draw, Billy moves his hands away from his guns. Doc tries to provoke him, winging the Kid three times, but Billy refuses to return fire. The two reconcile. Furious, Garrett calls Doc out, despite not having a chance. Doc makes no attempt to shoot his friend and is fatally wounded. Garrett is nonplussed.

After Doc is buried, Garrett offers to give Billy Doc's revolvers as mementos, requesting Billy's in return. He says he'll tell everyone he'd buried Billy instead of Doc, and the Kid can leave his past behind and make a fresh start in life. Billy agrees, but Garrett had removed the firing pins from Doc's guns. However, while comparing the revolvers, Billy switches one of Doc's for his, and he gets the jump on a gloating Garrett. He handcuffs the lawman to a post, encouraging him to stick to his original yarn rather than admit having been left helpless by the Kid. As Billy starts to ride away, he stops and looks back; Rio runs to join him and they gallop off together on the roan.

== Cast ==
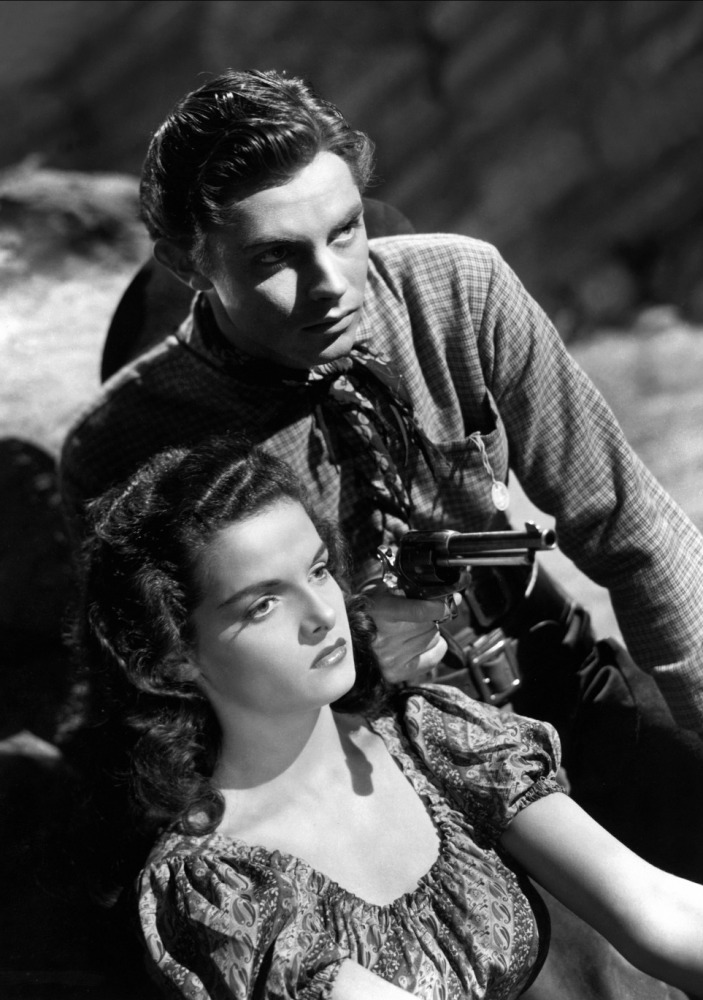
Jack Buetel and Jane Russell in the film

- Jack Buetel as Billy the Kid
- Jane Russell as Rio McDonald
- Thomas Mitchell as Pat Garrett
- Walter Huston as Doc Holliday
- Mimi Aguglia as Guadalupe
- Joe Sawyer as Charley
- Gene Rizzi as stranger who tries to trick Billy
- Dickie Jones as boy (uncredited)
- Edward Peil Sr. as Swanson (uncredited)
- Lee Shumway as card dealer (uncredited)

== Production ==
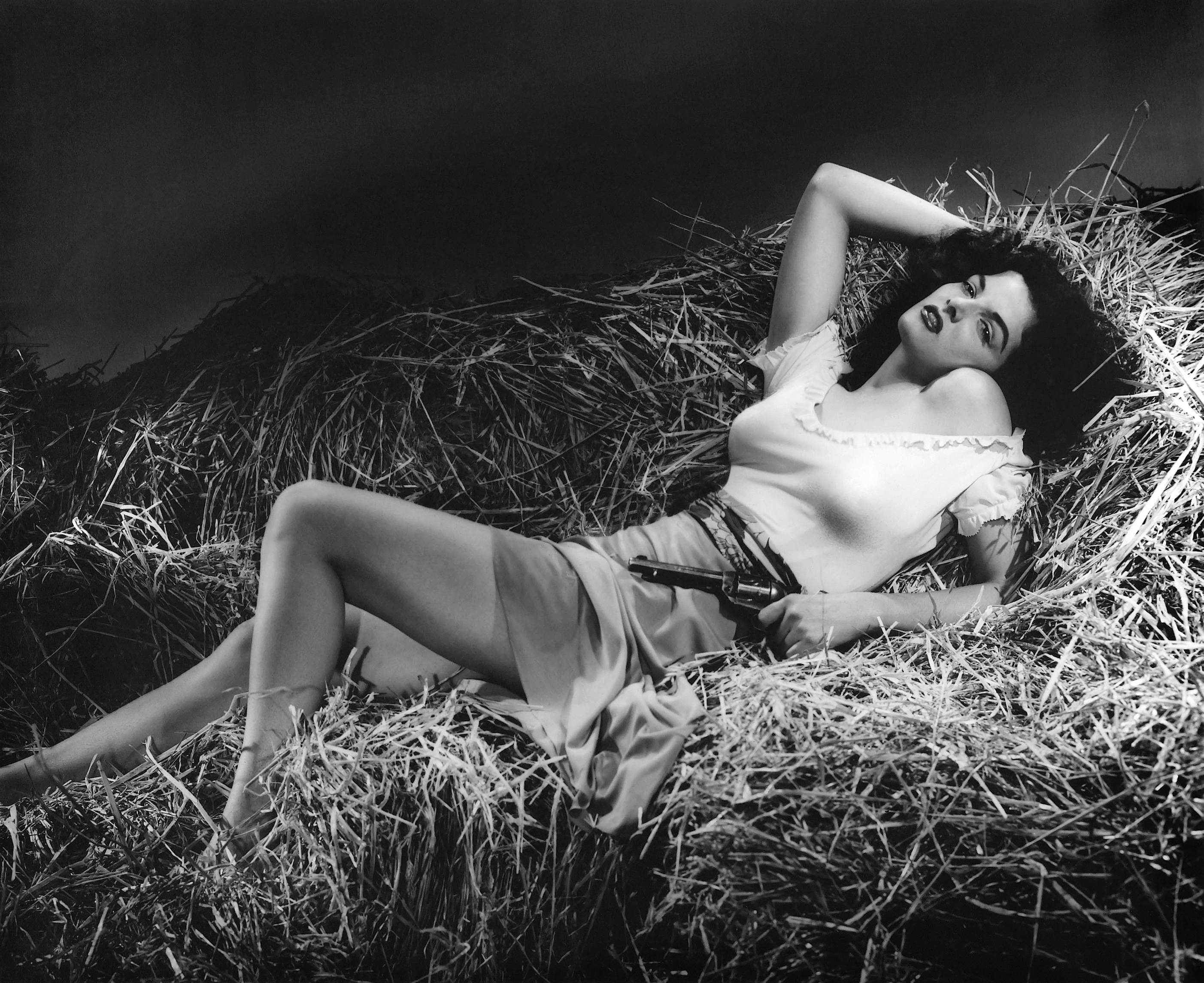
Famous publicity still used to promote both the film and Russell

=== Casting ===
The Los Angeles Times reported that Howard Hughes was specifically looking for an actress with "ample breasts" to portray Rio McDonald.

According to one story, Hughes himself discovered Jane Russell while she was working as a receptionist, either for a dentist or a podiatrist, but this has turned out to be false. Instead, a talent agent spotted Russell at a photographer's studio, leading either Hughes or Hawks to hire her. However, it is true that Russell had a job as a receptionist at the time. Russell was hired after a single audition.

=== Filming ===
While filming The Outlaw, Hughes felt that the camera did not properly capture Russell's bust, so he designed a cantilevered underwire bra to emphasize her figure. He added curved metal supports that were sewn into the brassiere under each breast cup and connected to the bra's shoulder straps. This arrangement was intended to expose more of her breasts. Contrary to many later media reports, Russell did not wear the bra during filming; she said in her 1988 autobiography that it was so uncomfortable that she secretly discarded it. She wrote that the "ridiculous" contraption hurt so much that she only wore it for a few minutes and instead wore her own bra. To prevent Hughes from noticing, Russell padded the cups with tissue and tightened the shoulder straps before returning to the set. She later said: "I never wore it in The Outlaw, and he never knew. He wasn't going to take my clothes off to check if I had it on. I just told him I did." Hughes' bra was later exhibited in a Hollywood museum.

== Release ==
=== Early controversy (1941-1943) ===
After the film was completed in February 1941, Hughes faced difficulty obtaining approval from the Hollywood Production Code Administration because of the film's display of Russell's breasts. The Code office ordered cuts, and Hughes reluctantly removed about 40 feet, or half a minute's worth of footage that prominently featured Russell's bust. However, 20th Century Fox still wished to cancel its agreement to release The Outlaw.

Facing the loss of millions of dollars, Hughes sought to create a public outcry for his film to be banned. Hughes had his managers call ministers, women's clubs and housewives, informing them about the purportedly lewd film soon to be released. This caused the public protests and calls to ban the film for which Hughes had hoped in order to establish a demand for the film's release.

=== First release (1943) ===
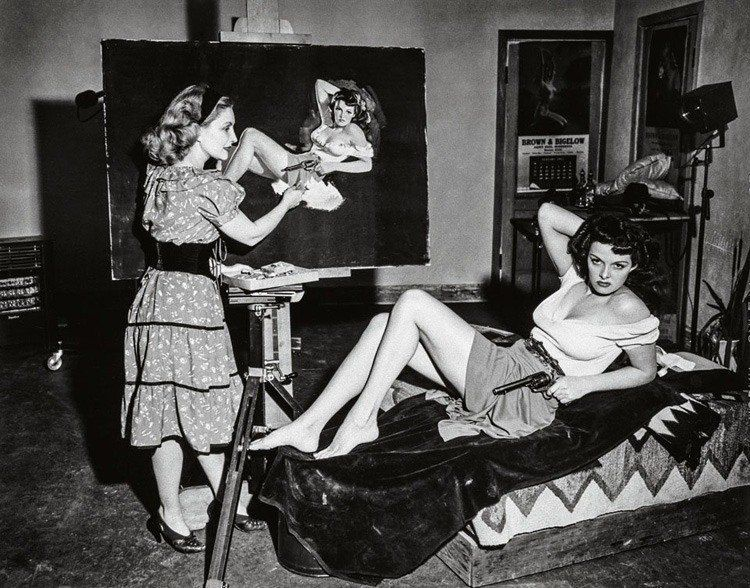
Zoë Mozert painting Jane Russell to promote the film

The film opened February 5, 1943 at the Geary Theatre in San Francisco on a reserved seat, upped scale basis, without the Hays office purity seal but with the Production Code seal of approval. The film was due to play the Geary for three weeks before a two-week run at the Tivoli in San Francisco, with Hughes leasing the theatres.

The film's attendance at the Geary was near capacity in its opening two weeks and grossed $31,000 in its opening week. After two weeks, police started a censorship drive for the posters featuring Russell, following complaints about the posters and obscene remarks and embellishments scribbled on them, and planned warrants for the arrest of the billposting company representatives before the posters were removed. Following release, the Legion of Decency gave it their "condemned" classification due to its "glorification of crime and immoral actions" and "indecent" costuming. The film eventually played four weeks at the Tivoli, for a total of seven weeks in San Francisco, grossing $140,000, a record for a film in the city at the time.

Due to issues finding somewhere to play the film in Detroit, Hughes acquired a 15-year lease on the RKO Downtown in Detroit with the intention of screening the film in the city to defy the Hays office and censors. Hughes also agreed to cuts to the film for its planned release in Pennsylvania to remove certain scenes with Russell, which also meant that certain shots of Russell could not appear in advertising in the state. However, with no release dates agreed and another deal with Fox that fell through, the film sat on the shelf.

=== Second release (1946-1947) ===
The Outlaw was rereleased by United Artists in the first week of March 1946 at the Loew's theatre in Richmond, Virginia where it set a house record for the weekend. Six minutes were cut for the rerelease. Further release dates were set for Chicago, Atlanta and Norfolk, Virginia on March 14, 1946 and Salt Lake City on March 15. In its first week at the Oriental Theatre in Chicago, paired with a stage show featuring Russell, it grossed a house record $73,000 for the week. It set house records in most theatres it played in. The film faced further challenges with its advertising, which wasn't approved by the Motion Picture Association, and in September 1946, the film's seal of approval was revoked. As United Artists were not members of the Association, they didn't have to cease distribution. These issues limited the number of theatres where it could play and, by the end of 1946, the film had earned $1.75 million in theatrical rentals in the United States and Canada for United Artists. The film was banned in New York and city License Commissioner Ben Fielding threatened to revoke the license of any theatre that played the film. However, in September 1947, United Artists decided to defy the ban by showing the film in one of their closed theatres, the Broadway Theatre, and Fielding decided not to take any action. By the end of its run in 1947, it had earned UA $2.5 million.

For its Australian release, a new ending was shot to ensure that law and order prevailed.

=== Further releases (1949 onwards) ===
In 1948, RKO, now owned by Hughes, acquired distribution rights for the film. Further cuts were made to secure the Production Code seal of approval in October 1949, and the film received a B rating (morally objectionable in part) from the Legion of Decency. It opened over the 1950 New Year holiday in 21 theatres and performed well in its opening week. Based on the key cities that Variety tracked, it was number three at the US box office in its second week. The rerelease brought its lifetime rental earnings to $5.075 million. There was an additional rerelease in 1952. By 1968, the film was reported to have grossed $20 million.

Hughes sued Classic Film Museum, Inc. and Alan J. Taylor for unlawful distribution of Hell's Angels, Scarface and The Outlaw. When it emerged that The Outlaw had fallen into the public domain in 1969 for lack of copyright renewal, the case was settled, with Classic Film Museum agreeing to stop distribution of the two copyrighted titles and Hughes withdrawing his claim on The Outlaw.

The film was later colorized twice. The first colorization was released by Hal Roach Studios in 1988. The second colorized version, produced by Legend Films, was released to DVD on June 16, 2009, featuring both the newly colorized edition and a restored black-and-white edition of the film. The DVD version also features an audio commentary by Jane Russell and actress Terry Moore, Hughes's alleged wife. Russell approved of the colorization, stating "The color looked great. It was not too strong, like in many of the early colorized movies that made the films look cheap."

== Critical reception ==
William Brogdon wrote in his review of the film in Variety that, "Beyond sex attraction of Miss Russell's frankly displayed charms, the picture, according to accepted screen entertainment standards, falls short". In 1946, Herb at Variety said it was "full of surprises. First is that it is so bad." The film's worst point was deemed to be its slowness and Russell and Buetel's performances were described as amateurish. The dialogue, direction and music were all felt to be cliched. After finally getting to see the film in 1947, The New York Times called it "a strictly second-rate Western, long and tedious and crudely acted for the most part, a great deal more soporific than swashbuckling". They said of Russell that while "undeniably decorative in low-cut blouses, she is hopelessly inept as an actress."
