= Jack Buetel =

American actor

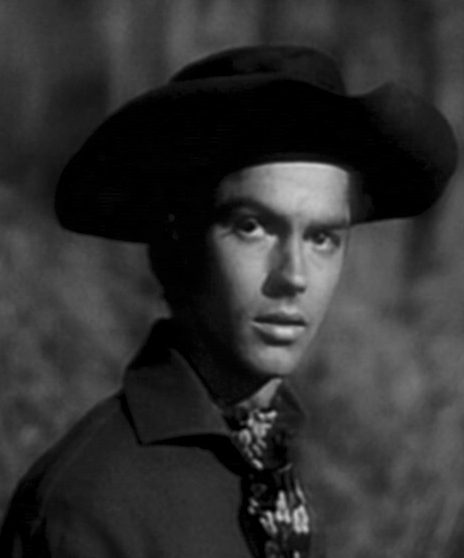
- Jack Buetel from The Outlaw, 1943
- Born: John Alexander Beutel; September 5, 1915; Dallas, Texas, U.S.
- Died: June 27, 1989 (aged 73); Portland, Oregon, U.S.
- Resting place: Wilhelm's Portland Memorial, Mausoleum JS2 Tier 3 Vault 10, Portland, Oregon, U.S. 45.47453°N 122.65186°W
- Occupation: Actor
- Years active: 1943–1961
- Spouse: Joann Jensen Beutel (m. 1937–1984)

Jack Buetel (September 5, 1915 – June 27, 1989) was an American film and television actor best known for portraying Billy the Kid in Howard Hughes’s controversial Western The Outlaw (1943).

== Early life ==
Buetel was born John Alexander Beutel in Dallas, Texas. He had stage experience in little theater in Dallas before being chosen to co-star in Hughes’s The Outlaw; Hughes also changed the spelling of his surname to "Buetel" in publicity to avoid mispronunciation.

== Career ==
Hughes cast Buetel as Billy the Kid in The Outlaw alongside newcomers Jane Russell and veterans Walter Huston and Thomas Mitchell. Production took place in 1940–41, but troubles with the Production Code and local bans delayed general exhibition for years. The film had a 1943 premiere and piecemeal engagements, but wider releases followed in 1946–47 after further edits and highly publicized marketing. Contemporary critics were mixed to hostile; Variety faulted the film beyond Russell’s sex appeal, and The New York Times called it “strictly second-rate…long and tedious and crudely acted,” assessments summarized in the AFI Catalog.

After The Outlaw, Buetel’s screen opportunities were limited. He returned to features as Bob Younger in Best of the Badmen (1951) and appeared in Westerns including Rose of Cimarron (1952), The Half-Breed (1952), and Jesse James' Women (1954).

=== Television ===
Buetel co-starred as deputy Jeff Taggert in the syndicated color Western series Judge Roy Bean (1955–56), which ran 39 episodes and was set in Langtry, Texas. He also made guest appearances on 26 Men (1958), Maverick (1959), Hawaiian Eye (1960), Wagon Train (1959–61), and Lawman (1961).

=== Later years ===
Buetel appeared as himself in the television special Night of 100 Stars (1982). His last dramatic screen credit was a 1961 episode of Wagon Train.

== Personal life ==
An early marriage to Cereatha Browning was reported in 1941. He later married Joann Jensen Crawford (also credited as Joann Jensen Beutel). Buetel relocated to Portland, Oregon, by the 1970s.

== Death ==
Buetel died in Portland on June 27, 1989, aged 73, and was interred at Portland Memorial Mausoleum (Mausoleum JS2 Tier 3 Vault 10).

== Legacy and reception ==
The Outlaw’s stop-start release pattern and censorship battles have been widely studied; the AFI Catalog documents the film’s staggered openings (1943, 1946, 1947), bans, and edited rereleases, as well as contemporaneous critical reaction. The role remained Buetel’s signature part.

== Filmography ==
Year	Title	Role	Notes
1943	The Outlaw	Billy the Kid	As Jack Beutel
1951	Best of the Badmen	Bob Younger	
1952	Rose of Cimarron	Marshal Hollister	
1952	The Half-Breed	Charlie Wolf	
1954	Jesse James' Women	Frank James	
1955–1956	Judge Roy Bean	Jeff Taggert	39 episodes
1958	26 Men	Ranger Johnny Whitecloud	2 episodes
1959	Mustang!	Gable	As Jack Beutel
1959	Mackenzie's Raiders	Corby's Henchman	Episode: "The Poisoners"
1959	Maverick	Phillips	Episode: "Easy Mark"
1960	Hawaiian Eye	Dr. Eliot	Episode: "The Kamehameha Cloak"
1959–1961	Wagon Train	Jack Reynolds / Joe Hampler	2 episodes
1961	Lawman	Ryder	Episode: "Whiphand" (final appearance)
