= Vincent Salyers =

American professor of nursing

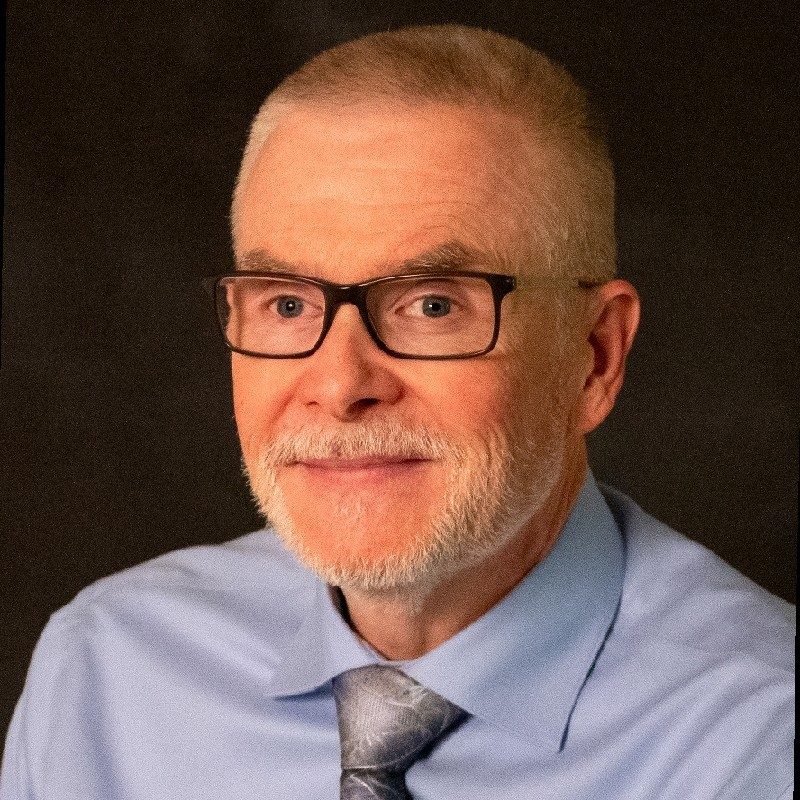
- Born: Des Moines, Iowa
- Citizenship: USA and Canada
- Education: San Francisco State University; University of San Francisco
- Known for: Nurse education
- Awards: Fellow AAN; Fellow ANEF
- Scientific career
- Fields: Nurse education
- Workplaces: Mount Royal University; MacEwan University; Gonzaga University; Cardinal Stritch University; Arizona College of Nursing; Mercy College of Health Sciences
- Website: www.linkedin.com/in/vince-salyers/

Vincent Salyers is an American professor of nursing. He is best known for his contributions to intersections between technology, curriculum design, clinical practice and inter-professional education.

Salyers earned his BS in psychology and his MS in nursing at San Francisco State University, and he earned his doctorate from the University of San Francisco.

Prior to joining the faculty at Gonzaga University, where he was the Dean of the School of Nursing and Human Physiology, Salyers was the inaugural dean of the Faculty of Nursing at MacEwan University. Salyers held previous positions on the faculty and administration of a number of universities in the United States and Canada including as associate dean of the Faculty of Health, Community & Education at Mount Royal University in Calgary.

In 2014, Salyers was inducted as a Fellow of the Academy of Nursing Education of the National League for Nursing, and in 2019, he was inducted as a Fellow of the American Academy of Nursing.

In 2023, Salyers was appointed as the Dean of Nursing for the East Hartford, CT campus of Arizona College of Nursing.

In 2025, Mercy College of Health Sciences announced the appointment of Dr. Salyers as the first dean of the newly established Joyce E. Lillis School of Nursing. With over 30 years of experience in academic and clinical settings, Salyers is recognized nationally for his contributions to nursing education, academic innovation, and global health engagement.
