= Pat DiCicco =

American film producer (1909–1978)

- Born: Pasquale DeCicco; February 14, 1909; New York City, U.S.
- Died: October 24, 1978 (aged 69); New York City, U.S.
- Other name: The Glamour Boy of Hollywood
- Occupations: Agent, movie producer
- Years active: 1935–1946
- Spouses: Thelma Todd (m. 1932; div. 1934) Gloria Vanderbilt (m. 1941; div. 1945) Mary Jo Tarola (m. 1952; div. 1960)
- Relatives: Albert R. Broccoli (cousin)

Pasquale "Pat" DiCicco (/dɪˈsiːkoʊ/ diss-EE-koh; February 14, 1909 – October 24, 1978) was an American agent, movie producer, and occasional actor, as well as an alleged mobster working for Lucky Luciano. He was married three times, including to Thelma Todd and Gloria Vanderbilt. He was a cousin of Albert R. Broccoli and gave him his nickname "Cubby".

== Personal life ==
DiCicco married Thelma Todd in 1932. The couple had a particularly unstable marriage, and they frequently erupted in drunken brawls, one of which resulted in a broken nose for DiCicco and an emergency appendectomy for Todd. They divorced in 1934. Todd died a year later from what was ruled to be accidental carbon monoxide poisoning.

In 1941, DiCicco married Gloria Vanderbilt. Vanderbilt, who was only 17 and had moved to Hollywood that same year. DiCicco was allegedly a temperamental and abusive husband who called Vanderbilt "Fatsy Roo" and regularly beat her. Vanderbilt later said, "He would take my head and bang it against the wall. I had black eyes." They divorced in 1945.

In 1953, DiCicco married actress Mary Joanne Tarola (born February 27, 1928), also known by her stage name, Linda Douglas. The marriage lasted eight years before ending in divorce in 1960.

DiCicco died in 1978 after a long bout with cancer.

== Ted Healy death ==
DiCicco is alleged to have been involved in an altercation with comedian Ted Healy just before the latter's death in 1937. A source alleged that actor Wallace Beery, producer Albert R. "Cubby" Broccoli and DiCicco beat Healy so badly that he fell into a coma and died. While there is no documentation in contemporaneous news reports that either Beery or DiCicco was present, Broccoli admitted that he was indeed involved in a fist fight with Healy at the Trocadero. He later modified his story, stating that a heavily intoxicated Healy had picked a fight with him, the two had briefly scuffled, then shook hands and parted ways. In other reports, Broccoli admitted to pushing Healy, but not striking him. It is also possible the investigation and subsequent newspaper coverage were influenced by the Metro-Goldwyn-Mayer studio "fixers" Eddie Mannix and Howard Strickling (Mannix would later run the studio) because Wallace Beery was one of MGM's highest paid actors. Beery took a long vacation in Europe after the altercation until the story died down.

There is disagreement over whether Healy died as a result of the brawl or due to his well-known alcoholism. Because of the authorities' lack of interest in investigating Healy's death, an autopsy was not performed until after Healy's corpse had been embalmed, rendering the examiner's note that Healy's organs were "soaked in alcohol" useless in determining a cause of death.

Following the autopsy, the Los Angeles county coroner reported that Healy died of acute toxic nephritis secondary to acute and chronic alcoholism. Police closed their investigation. There was no indication in the report that his death was caused by physical assault.
