= John W. Holmes (film editor) =

- Born: 12 April 1917
- Died: 25 May 2001 (aged 84)
- Occupation: Film editor
- Years active: 1964-1981

John W. Holmes (12 April 1917 – 25 May 2001) was a film editor. He was one of the editors on Diamonds Are Forever and The Andromeda Strain.

He was nominated along with Stuart Gilmore at the 44th Academy Awards in the category of Best Film Editing for the film The Andromeda Strain. He died in 2001.

== Filmography ==
Editor
Year	Film	Director
1964	Goodbye Charlie	Vincente Minnelli
1968	Chubasco	Allen H. Miner
1970	The Only Game in Town	George Stevens
1971	The Andromeda Strain	Robert Wise
1971	Diamonds Are Forever	Guy Hamilton
1973	Showdown	George Seaton
1978	Just Tell Me You Love Me	Tony Mordente
1979	Just You and Me, Kid	Leonard B. Stern
1980	Popeye	Robert Altman
1981	Inchon	Terence Young

TV movies

Editor
Year	Film	Director
1971	Crosscurrent	Jerry Thorpe
1973	Jarrett	Barry Shear
1974	Killer Bees	Curtis Harrington
1978	Daddy, I Don't Like It Like This	Adell Aldrich

TV series

Editor
Year	Title	Notes
1964	Voyage to the Bottom of the Sea	1 episode
