= Judge Roy Bean (TV series) =

- Genre: Western
- Starring: Edgar Buchanan; Jack Buetel; Jackie Loughery; Russell Hayden
- Country of origin: United States
- Original language: English
- No. of seasons: 1
- No. of episodes: 39

Production
- Producer: Russell Hayden
- Running time: 30-minute episodes

Original release
- Network: Syndication
- Release: September 9, 1955 – June 13, 1956

Judge Roy Bean was a syndicated Western television series based very loosely on the life of a Texas justice of the peace. Edgar Buchanan played Roy Bean, known as "the only law west of the Pecos." The series was originally broadcast during the 1955 television season.

The series was set in Langtry, Texas, and starred Buchanan as Judge Roy Bean, Jackie Loughery as his niece Letty Bean, and Jack Buetel as Jeff Taggert, Bean's deputy. Russell Hayden had a recurring role as Steve, a Texas Ranger. Hayden was also the series' producer. Guest stars included Tris Coffin, Myron Healey, X Brands, Glenn Strange and Lash LaRue.

The self-appointed Judge Bean held court in his combination general store and saloon and often assigned Jeff Taggert to investigate crimes. Bean was an admirer of actress Lillie Langtry, and claimed that the town of Langtry was named in her honor, though the Southern Pacific Railroad had given the town the name of one of their dignitaries.

The show's 39 half-hour episodes were shot in color in Pioneertown, California. In the mid-1950s, most television stations only broadcast black-and-white programming, and during the series's original run, only five stations aired Judge Roy Bean episodes in color. The remaining stations showed the syndicated series in black-and-white.

== Episodes ==
No.	Title	Directed by	Written by	Original release date
1	"The Judge of Pecos Valley"	William Berke	Rik Vollaerts and R.M. Hayden	September 1, 1955
The Judge captures a train robber and hands him over to the Texas Rangers. X Brands played Dan Wiler.
2	"Family Ties"	Derwin Abbe	Orville H. Hampton	September 8, 1955
The Judge helps a family being forced off their land by men who know the railroad wants to buy the property.
3	"The Horse Thief"	Derwin Abrahams	Buckley Angell	September 15, 1955
A rancher is accused of stealing horses, and townspeople want to lynch him. X Brands played Hackett.
4	"Sunburnt Gold"	Derwin Abbe	Orville H. Hampton	September 22, 1955
Criminals are trying to make stolen gold coins look like mined gold nuggets. Russell Hayden played Steve.
5	"The Wedding of Old Sam"	Derwin Abbe	Russell Hayden & Jack Jacobs & Malvin Wald	September 29, 1955
The Judge helps a friend and becomes involved in a marriage proposal and an impersonation. Tris Coffin played Sam, X Brands was the stage driver, and Russell Hayden played Steve.
6	"The Runaway"	Derwin Abrahams	Buckley Angell	October 6, 1955
A boy thinks his father a coward for taking abuse from his boss to provide for his family. X Brands played Dallas.
7	"Slightly Prodigal"	Derwin Abrahams	George Van Marter	October 13, 1955
Mrs. Brown comes to Langtry in search of her son and learns he was one of the outlaws who robbed the stagecoach she was on. X Brands played Jim Brown.
8	"Black Jack"	Derwin Abbe	Orville H. Hampton	October 20, 1955
The Judge pursues a train robber who escaped from prison and murdered the man who betrayed him. X Brands played Rev. Peter Cable.
9	"Judge Declares a Holiday"	Derwin Abrahams	Roy Erwin	October 13, 1955
Con men come to town, arrange horse races, then leave with all money that was bet.
10	"Citizen Romeo"	Reg Browne	Orville H. Hampton	November 3, 1955
The Judge learns of a scheme to smuggle guns to the Indians, and he encounters an unlikely pair of allies to stop the smuggling, an organ grinder and his monkey. Russell Hayden played Steve.
11	"Connie Comes to Town"	Derwin Abbe	Milton M. Raison	November 10, 1955
When Connie Ward comes to town, Letty is harassed by villains seeking to learn her whereabouts. X Brands played Daniels.
12	"The Fugitive"	Derwin Abrahams	Buckley Angell	November 17, 1955
The Judge helps a rancher who is being blackmailed by crooks wanting to steal his land. X Brands played Hickey and Russell Hayden played Steve.
13	"Letty Leaves Home"	Derwin Abrahams	Buckley Angell	November 24, 1955
Letty wants to leave Langtry, for she believes her tomboy ways are keeping her from being seen as a lady. X Brands played Klondike.
14	"Murder in Langtry"	Reg Browne	Al Frank	December 1, 1955
The Judge helps Jeff Taggart, who is framed for murdering the horse trader who cheated him.
15	"Vinegarone"	Derwin Abrahams	Orville H. Hampton	December 8, 1955
The Judge helps a young man, whom con men claim does not have legal title to the silver mine he inherited. X Brands played Buck; Russell Hayden played Steve.
16	"Ah Sid Cowboy"	Nate Watt	David Dixon	January 1, 1956
The Judge helps his friend Ah Sid, who is being forced to translate a map stolen from Chinese gold miners. Sammee Tong played Ah Sid and Glenn Strange played Fallon.
17	"Checkmate"	Unknown	Orville H. Hampton	January 8, 1956
The Judge is almost fooled by a phony death and funeral of a wanted killer. Myron Healey played Reno and Russell Hayden played Steve.
18	"Desperate Journey"	Reg Browne	Buckley Angell	January 15, 1956
A young man seeking his birthright is accused of murder and makes a run for it.
19	"Eyes of Texas"	Reg Browne	Orville H. Hampton	January 22, 1956
Crooked ranchers attempt to steal land from an Indian tribe and kill an Indian brave. The Judge must prevent a massacre.
20	"The Gunman's Bargain"	Nate Watt	Virginia M. Cooke	January 29, 1956
John Wesley Hardin rides into Langtry just as Judge Bean receives a wanted poster on him. X Brands played Tyler.
21	"The Hidden Truth"	Nate Watt	John Ward	February 6, 1956
The Judge tries to clear an ex-convict who was innocently involved in murder and robbery. X Brands played Grover.
22	"The Judge's Dilemma"	Nate Watt	Sloan Nibley	February 12, 1956
The Judge goes after swindlers trying to take control of Langtry. The swindlers bring false charges of misconduct against Judge Bean. Glenn Strange played Mason and X Brands played Danning.
23	"The Katcina Doll"	Nate Watt	James L. Henderson	February 20, 1956
Mexican Indian villagers have their sacred idol stolen. Neither the Judge nor Deputy Jeff have jurisdiction across the border, but Letty agrees to help lure the criminals back to Texas. Lash LaRue played Storts.
24	"Outlaw's Son"	Nate Watt	Oliver Drake	February 27, 1956
The Judge helps an outlaw's son choose between right and wrong after his father is murdered. Lash LaRue played Matt Logan, X Brands played Ben Logan, and Russell Hayden played Steve.
25	"The Reformer"	Nate Watt	Buckley Angell	March 6, 1956
The Judge confronts a female reformer determined to remake Langtry to her liking. Bernadene Hayes played Dolly Mason, Lash LaRue played Duke Castle, and X Brands played Jonas.
26	"The Travelers"	Reg Browne	Charles R. Mariion	March 13, 1956
The Judge and Jeff Taggert go after a killer, and they are joined by a rancher who wants a lynching. Bernadene Hayes played Mrs. Atkins.
27	"The Elopers"	Thor L. Brooks	Unknown	March 20, 1956
Sharon intends to marry Adam over the objections of her wealthy father.
28	"Spirit of the Law"	Reg Browne	Bea Lisse	April 3, 1956
The Judge goes after twin brothers who give each other alibis for their holdups. Lash LaRue played Todd Malone and Will Malone.
29	"Bad Medicine"	Reg Browne	Bea Lisse	April 3, 1956
The Judge suspects that Doc Malone's medicine show is hiding a killer. Russell Hayden played Steve.
30	"The Defense Rests"	Reg Browne	Buckley Angell	April 10, 1956
Deputy Jeff Taggert's brother is accused of robbing a bank, and the deputy is suspected of being involved with the crime. Lash LaRue played the bank cashier.
31	"Deliver the Body"	Nate Watt	Buckley Angell	April 17, 1956
Sheriff Blade arrives to arrest Del Randall on what the Judge considers trumped-up charges. Judge Bean and Jeff Taggert put Del in jail to protect him.
32	"The Hypnotist"	Nate Watt	Sloan Nibley	April 24, 1956
Letty is hypnotized to recall past events connected to the legend of the Haunted Hills. Russell Hayden played Steve.
33	"Terror Rides the Trail"	Nate Watt	Oliver Drake	May 1, 1956
34	"Border Raiders"	Reg Browne	Buck Angell	May 8, 1956
The Judge and Jeff Taggert go after a band of marauding Apaches led by a white man. Tris Coffin played Kenyon, Glenn Strange played Tom Holman, and Russell Hayden played Steve.
35	"The Cross-Draw Kid"	Reg Browne	Oliver Drake	May 15, 1956
The Judge and Jeff Taggert take on the richest man in the valley over water rights. Tris Coffin played Jim Sabine and Glenn Strange played King Lonagan.
36	"Four Ladies From Laredo"	Thor Brooks	Buckley Angell	May 22, 1956
Four beautiful ladies come to Langtry, and the Judge and Jeff Taggert go courting, instead of paying more attention to a local robbery. A Texas Ranger is suspicious of the women's behavior. Russell Hayden played Steve, the Texas Ranger.
37	"Luck o' the Irish"	Thor Brooks	John Ward	May 29, 1956
Pat O'Hara and his much younger bride come to town. Pat's drinking and gambling get him involved with the town's rowdies.
38	"The Refugee"	Reg Browne	Unknown	June 5, 1956
39	"Lone Star Killer"	Reg Browne	Buckley Angell	June 13, 1956
When a Texas Ranger is murdered, the Judge and Jeff Taggert vow to bring the killer to justice. Lash LaRue played Bass.

== Streaming ==
On Tubi, 37 of the 39 episodes are available for streaming.

== Reception ==
Joseph Landau of the Louisville (Kentucky) The Courier-Journal stated that "the only similarity between Judge Roy Bean of television and the real Roy Bean is the TV boys got the name right."
