= Abigail A. Salyers =

American microbiologist

- Microbiologist
- Born: December 24, 1942; Louisville, KY
- Died: November 6, 2013 (aged 70); Urbana, IL
- Occupation: Microbiologist
- Children: Georgia E. Will

Abigail A. Salyers (1942 – 2013) was a microbiologist who pioneered the field of human microbiome research. Her work on the bacterial phylum Bacteroidetes and its ecology led to a better understanding of antibiotic resistance and mobile genetic elements. At a time when the prevailing paradigm was focused on E. coli as a model organism, Salyers emphasized the importance of investigating the breadth of microbial diversity. She was one of the first to conceptualize the human body as a microbial ecosystem. Over the course of her 40-year career, she was presented with numerous awards for teaching and research and an honorary degree from ETH Zurich, and served as president of the American Society for Microbiology.

== Education ==
Abigail Salyers was born in Louisville, Kentucky and attended high school in Arlington, Virginia at Wakefield High School. During high school, she was at risk of expulsion due to being pregnant, but she graduated in 1959 and with the help of her English teacher, Mrs. Baker, applied to college. Salyers went on to receive her undergraduate degree in Mathematics in 1963 and a Ph.D. in Nuclear Physics in 1969 from George Washington University, Washington, D.C.

== Career ==
Four years into her first academic position teaching and researching physics at St. Mary's College, Salyers chose to switch her focus to microbiology as a post-doctoral researcher at Virginia Polytech Institute. She began to study the metabolism of the anaerobic microbes of the human intestinal tract, particularly the anaerobic bacterium Bacteroidetes. In 1978, Salyers started her own lab at the University of Illinois at Urbana-Champaign. There she met her long-time life partner and fellow professor Jeffrey Gardner, as well as her research associate and collaborator Nadja Shoemaker. In 1983, she became the first woman professor in the Microbiology Department to be granted tenure, and in 1988 was promoted to full professor. In 2004, she was named the G. William Arends Professor in Molecular and Cellular Biology.

As a lecturer at the University of Illinois, Salyers worked tirelessly to revitalize the inaccessible medical school curriculum. In her teaching, she emphasized the importance of microbiology as the defining biological discipline of the coming decades and its relevance to her students. To accompany her work in the classroom, she co-authored the textbook Bacterial Pathogenesis: A Molecular Approach with Dixie Whitt, with whom later collaborations followed. As a result of her educational efforts, Salyers was invited to be Co-Director of the Microbial Diversity Summer Course at the Marine Biological Laboratory in Woods Hole, MA for the summers of 1995–1999.

Salyers’ microbiome research was based in the study of the physiology of the anaerobic bacterium Bacteroides, with particular regard to their carbohydrate metabolism and their ability to harbor mobile antibiotic resistance genes. Her lab at the University of Illinois at Urbana-Champaign developed genetic tools that helped to expanded on her earlier research on polysaccharide transport and fermentation in Bacteroidetes. These tools fueled the discovery of the processes though which the bacterium sequesters complex carbohydrates inside the cell and anaerobically degrades them. In the human colon, these metabolic processes result in important byproducts which are utilized by other gut microflora and by the human host. In developing these genetic tools, Salyers’ lab discovered conjugative transposons, a type of mobile genetic element which can transfer genes for antibiotic resistance among gut bacteria. Initially, they used transposons as markers for genetic analysis. But Salyers also realized that transposons could carry antibiotic resistance genes between microbial cells in the human gut. They investigated the tightly regulated molecular mechanisms of the horizontal transfer of these mobile antibiotic resistance genes and discovered that Bacteroides acted as a reservoir of these genes in the human colon. The many tools that Salyers developed to work with her “funny bugs” and the discoveries she made are responsible for the prominence of Bacteroidetes as a model organism in microbiology today.

In 2001, Salyers was named President of the 40,000 member American Society for Microbiology. Her tenure overlapped with the 2001 anthrax attacks when she advised the US Postal service about the safety precautions. She learned that providing basic information to the postal workers about the bacterium made it possible to have discussions about sophisticated topics in microbiology in a simple way, and that having that information made them feel less frightened. In 2005, Salyers co-signed an open letter to the director of the NIH that asked the NIH to continue to fund research that had the capacity to broadly improve public health, instead of narrowly focusing on biodefense funding. She was also one of the first to recognize the public health risks of antibiotic resistant bacteria, and to convey the growing issue to the public. This included co-authoring Revenge of the Microbes: How Bacterial Resistance is Undermining the Antibiotic Miracle (again with Dixie Whitt), which summarized the latest information on bacterial pathogenesis and antibiotic resistance for a broad audience. Salyers was also president of the board for El Centro, a center that provided help for local Latino migrant workers in Illinois. She published over 220 scientific articles. Salyer has also provided her expert testimony regarding genetically modified plants and antibiotic use in agriculture to several regulatory agencies in the U.S. and Europe.

In 2014 after her death, the Salyers Symposium was held at the University of Illinois at Urbana-Champaign to commemorate her life and work. She was cited as the inspiration for the book Women in Microbiology.

== Awards for research and teaching ==
- 2009 National Graduate Teacher Award in Microbiology.
- Honorary Doctorate from ETH University in Zurich, Switzerland in 2001.
- Pasteur Award for Research and Teaching, the All-Campus Award for Excellence in Teaching and Golden Apple Award (three times) for Medical School Teaching at the University of Illinois.
- An endowed student scholarship for the Microbial Diversity Course was established in her name after her death.
- Named the G. William Arends Professor in Molecular and Cellular Biology from 2014 to 2013.
- An endowed student scholarship for the Microbial Diversity Course was established at the University of Chicago Marine Biological Laboratory in her name after her death.
- The University of Illinois at Urbana-Champaign holds the Abigail Salyers Distinguished Early Career Researcher Seminar Series.
- The University of Chicago Marine Biological Laboratory holds the Abigail Salyers Endowed Lecture in Microbial Diversity.

== Selected publications ==
- Wilson, Brenda A.; Salyers, Abigail A.; Whitt, Dixie D.; Winkler, Malcolm E. (2011). Bacterial Pathogenesis: A Molecular Approach. ASM Press. ISBN 9781555814182.
- Wax, Richard G.; Lewis, Kim; Taber, Harry; Salyers, Abigail A. (19 September 2019). Bacterial Resistance to Antimicrobials. CRC Press. ISBN 9780367388072.
- Salyers, Abigail A.; Whitt, Dixie D. (2005). Revenge of the Microbes. ASM Press. ISBN 9781555812980.
- Saylers, Abigail A.; Anamika, Gupta; Yanping, Wang (September 2004). "Human intestinal bacteria as reservoirs for antibiotic resistance genes". Trends in Microbiology. 12 (9): 412–6. doi:10.1016/J.TIM.2004.07.004. ISSN 0966-842X. PMID 15337162. Wikidata Q28279671.
