= Saunie Salyer =

American film critic

Saunie Salyer is an American film critic. She and Siew-Hwa Beh edited the periodical Women in Film, which they founded in 1972.

== Women in Film ==
Women in Film was the first feminist film periodical. Salyer and Beh were aspiring filmmakers in Los Angeles when they founded it in the early 1970s. According to Constance Penley, Professor of Film & Media Studies at UC Santa Barabara, it published "the first feminist critiques of Hollywood film," promoted alternative films, and researched women's contributions to film history.
