= Lupe Vélez filmography =

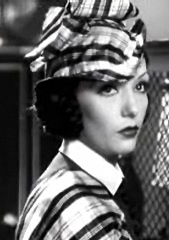
Vélez in Laughing Boy (1934).

This is a complete filmography of Mexican film actress Lupe Vélez. Vélez began her career in 1927, when she abandoned her native Mexico to start a career as an exotic beauty in the 1920s Hollywood. Vélez began her career in Mexico as a dancer, before moving to the U.S., where she worked in vaudeville. She was seen by Fanny Brice, who promoted her, and Vélez soon entered films, making her first appearance in 1927. Vélez's first feature-length film was The Gaucho (1927), starring Douglas Fairbanks. By the end of the decade, she had progressed to leading roles. With the advent of talking pictures, Vélez acted in comedies. She worked with directors like D. W. Griffith, Victor Fleming, William Wyler, and Cecil B. DeMille, among others, and with stars like Gary Cooper, Warner Baxter, Jimmy Durante, Oliver Hardy, and Stan Laurel, among others.. But she became disappointed with her film career, and moved to New York, where she worked in Broadway productions. Returning to Hollywood in 1939, she made a series of comedies named Mexican Spitfire. The Spitfire films rejuvenated Vélez's career. She also made some films in Mexico. Vélez was one of the first Mexican actresses to succeed in Hollywood. The others are Dolores del Río, Katy Jurado, and, in more recent years, Salma Hayek.

== Filmography ==
=== 1927–1929 ===
Year	Title	Role	Director	Other cast members
1927	What Women Did for Me	the Dean's daughter Nelly	James Parrott	Charley Chase, Robert Gray
1927	Sailors, Beware!	Baroness Behr	Fred Guiol	Oliver Hardy, Stan Laurel
1927	The Gaucho	The Mountain Girl	F. Richard Jones	Douglas Fairbanks, Joan Barclay
1928	Stand and Deliver	Jania	Donald Crisp	Rod La Rocque, Warner Oland
1929	Lady of the Pavements	Nanón del Rayón	D. W. Griffith	Jetta Goudal, Albert Conty
1929	Wolf Song	Lola Salazar	Victor Fleming	Gary Cooper, Louis Wolheim
1929	Where East Is East	Toyo Haines	Tod Browning	Lon Chaney, Lloyd Hughes
1929	Tiger Rose	Rose	George Fitzmaurice	Monte Blue, H. B. Warner, Rin Tin Tin

=== 1930–1938 ===
Year	Title	Role	Director	Other cast members
1930	Hell Harbor	Anita Morgan	Henry King	Jean Hersholt, John Holland
1930	The Storm	Manette Fachard	William Wyler	Paul Cavanagh, William Boyd
1930	East Is West	Ming Toy	Monta Bell	Edward G. Robinson, Lew Ayres
1931	Resurrection	Katyusha Maslova	Edwin Carewe	John Boles, William Keighley
1931	Resurrección	Katyusha Maslova	Eduardo Arozamena	Gilbert Roland, Blanca de Castejón
1931	The Squaw Man	Naturich	Cecil B. DeMille	Warner Baxter, Eleanor Boardman
1931	The Cuban Love Song	Nenita López	W. S. Van Dyke	Lawrence Tibbett, Jimmy Durante
1932	Hombres de mi vida	Julia Clark	Eduardo Arozamena	Gilbert Roland, Ramón Pereda
1932	The Broken Wing	Lolita	Lloyd Corrigan	Melvyn Douglas, Leo Carrillo
1932	Kongo	Tula	William J. Cowen	Walter Huston, Virginia Bruce
1932	The Half-Naked Truth	Teresita "Princess Exotica"	Gregory La Cava	Lee Tracy, Eugene Pallette
1933	Hot Pepper	Pepper	John G. Blystone	Victor McLaglen, Edmund Lowe
1934	Palooka	Nina Madero	Benjamin Stoloff	Jimmy Durante, Stuart Erwin
1934	Strictly Dynamite	Vera Mendez	Elliott Nugent	Jimmy Durante, Norman Foster
1934	Laughing Boy	Slim Girl	Oliver La Farge	Ramon Novarro, William B. Davidson
1934	Hollywood Party	The Jaguar Woman//Jane in Schnarzan Sequence	Oliver Hardy	Stan Laurel, Jimmy Durante, The Three Stooges, Mickey Mouse
1935	The Morals of Marcus	Carlotta	Miles Mander	Ian Hunter, Adrianne Allen
1936	Gypsy Melody	Mila	Edmond T. Gréville	Alfred Rode, Jerry Verno
1937	High Flyers	Maria Juanita Rosita Anita Moreno del Valle	Edward F. Cline	Bert Wheeler, Robert Woolsey
1937	Stardust	Carla de Huelva	Melville W. Brown	Ben Lyon, Wallace Ford
1938	La Zandunga	Lupe	Fernando de Fuentes	Arturo de Córdova, Joaquín Pardavé

=== 1939–1944 ===
Year	Title	Role	Director	Other cast members
1939	The Girl from Mexico	Carmelita Fuentes	Leslie Goodwins	Leon Errol, Donald Woods
1940	Mexican Spitfire	Carmelita Lindsay	Leslie Goodwins	Leon Errol, Donald Woods
1940	Mexican Spitfire Out West	Carmelita Lindsay	Leslie Goodwins	Leon Errol, Donald Woods
1941	Six Lessons from Madame La Zonga	Madame La Zonga	John Rawlins	Leon Errol, Helen Parrish
1941	The Mexican Spitfire's Baby	Carmelita Lindsay	Leslie Goodwins	Leon Errol, Charles "Buddy" Rogers, ZaSu Pitts
1941	Honolulu Lu	Consuelo Córdova	Charles Barton	Bruce Bennett, Leo Carrillo
1941	Playmates	Carmen Del Toro	David Butler	John Barrymore, Ginny Simms
1942	Mexican Spitfire at Sea	Carmelita Lindsay	Leslie Goodwins	Leon Errol, ZaSu Pitts, Charles "Buddy" Rogers
1942	Mexican Spitfire Sees a Ghost	Carmelita Lindsay	Leslie Goodwins	Leon Errol, Charles "Buddy" Rogers
1942	Mexican Spitfire's Elephant	Carmelita Lindsay	Leslie Goodwins	Leon Errol, Walter Reed
1943	Ladies' Day	Pepita Zorita	Leslie Goodwins	Eddie Albert, Patsy Kelly
1943	Redhead from Manhattan	Rita Manners/Elaine Manners	Lew Landers	Michael Duane, Tim Ryan
1943	Mexican Spitfire's Blessed Event	Carmelita Lindsay	Leslie Goodwins	Leon Errol, Walter Reed
1944	Nana	Nana	Roberto Gavaldón, Celestino Gorostiza	Crox Alvarado, Lilia Michel

=== Short films appearing as herself ===
Year	Title	Notes
1929	Hollywood Snapshots #11	
1932	The Voice of Hollywood No. 13	
1933	Mr. Broadway	
1941	Recordar es vivir	

== Theatre ==
Year	Play	Role	Theatre	Other notable cast members
1925	Mexican Ra-Ta-Plan	Many Roles	Teatro Regis, Mexico City	Delia Magaña, Celia Padilla
1925	¡No lo tapes!	Many Roles	Teatro Regis, Mexico City	
1925	Mexico Multicolor	Many Roles	Teatro Lírico, Mexico City	Delia Magaña, Joaquín Pardavé
1932	Hot-Cha!	Conchita	Ziegfeld Theatre, New York City	Bert Lahr, Buddy Rogers
1933	Strike Me Pink	Many roles	Majestic Theatre, New York City	Jimmy Durante
1938	You Never Know	María	Winter Garden Theatre, New York City	Libby Holman, Clifton Webb
