= Mexican Spitfire (film) =

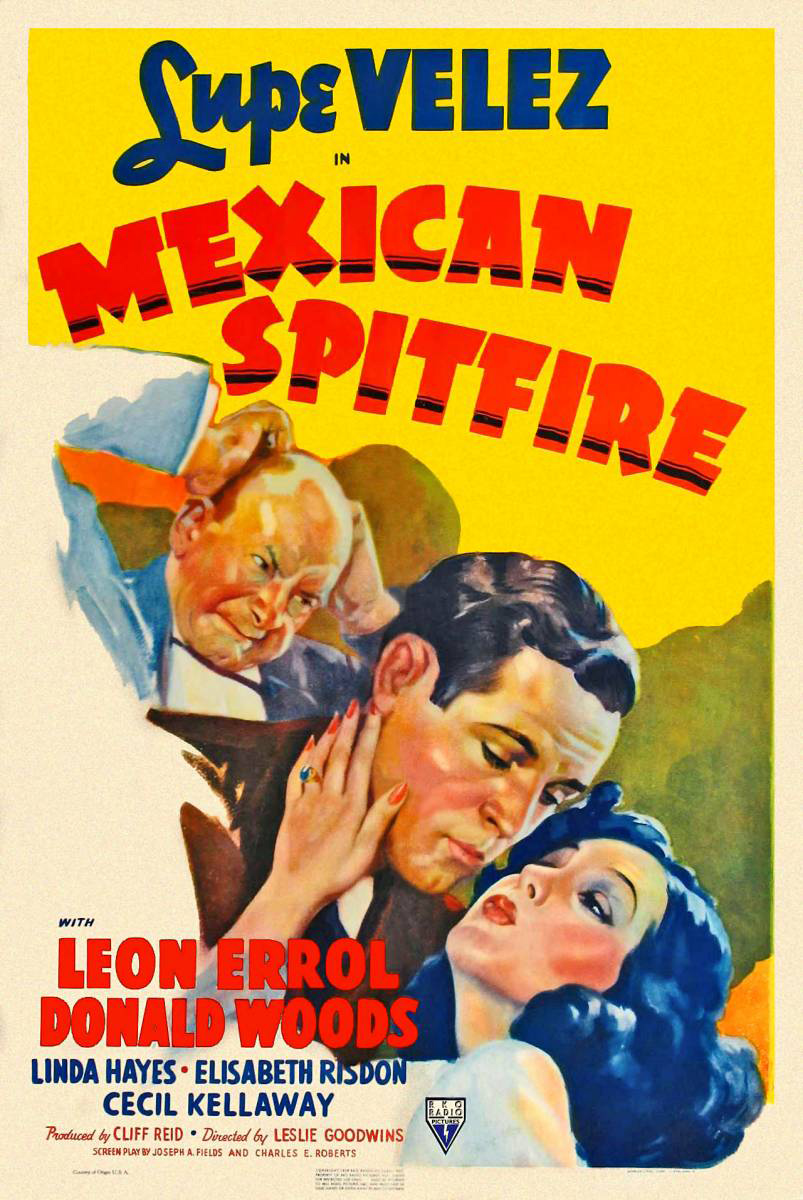
- Promotional poster of the film
- Directed by: Leslie Goodwins; James Anderson (assistant)
- Written by: Charles E. Roberts and Joseph Fields
- Produced by: Cliff Reid
- Starring: Lupe Vélez; Leon Errol; Donald Woods
- Cinematography: Jack MacKenzie
- Music by: Paul Sawtell
- Distributed by: RKO Radio Pictures
- Release date: January 12, 1940
- Running time: 67 minutes
- Country: United States
- Language: English
- Budget: $106,000
- Box office: $102,000

Mexican Spitfire is a 1940 American comedy film starring Lupe Vélez. She plays a hot-headed, fast-talking Mexican singer taken to New York for a radio gig, who decides she wants the ad agency man for herself. The film was the sequel of the film The Girl from Mexico (1939) and was the first of a film series of seven more films with the same title and main characters.

A sneak preview of the film in December 1939 prompted RKO to order three more in the series.

== Plot ==
Newlyweds Dennis and Carmelita have several obstacles to deal with in their new marriage: Carmelita's fiery Latin temper, a meddling aunt and a conniving ex-fiancee who is determined to break up their marriage.

== Cast ==
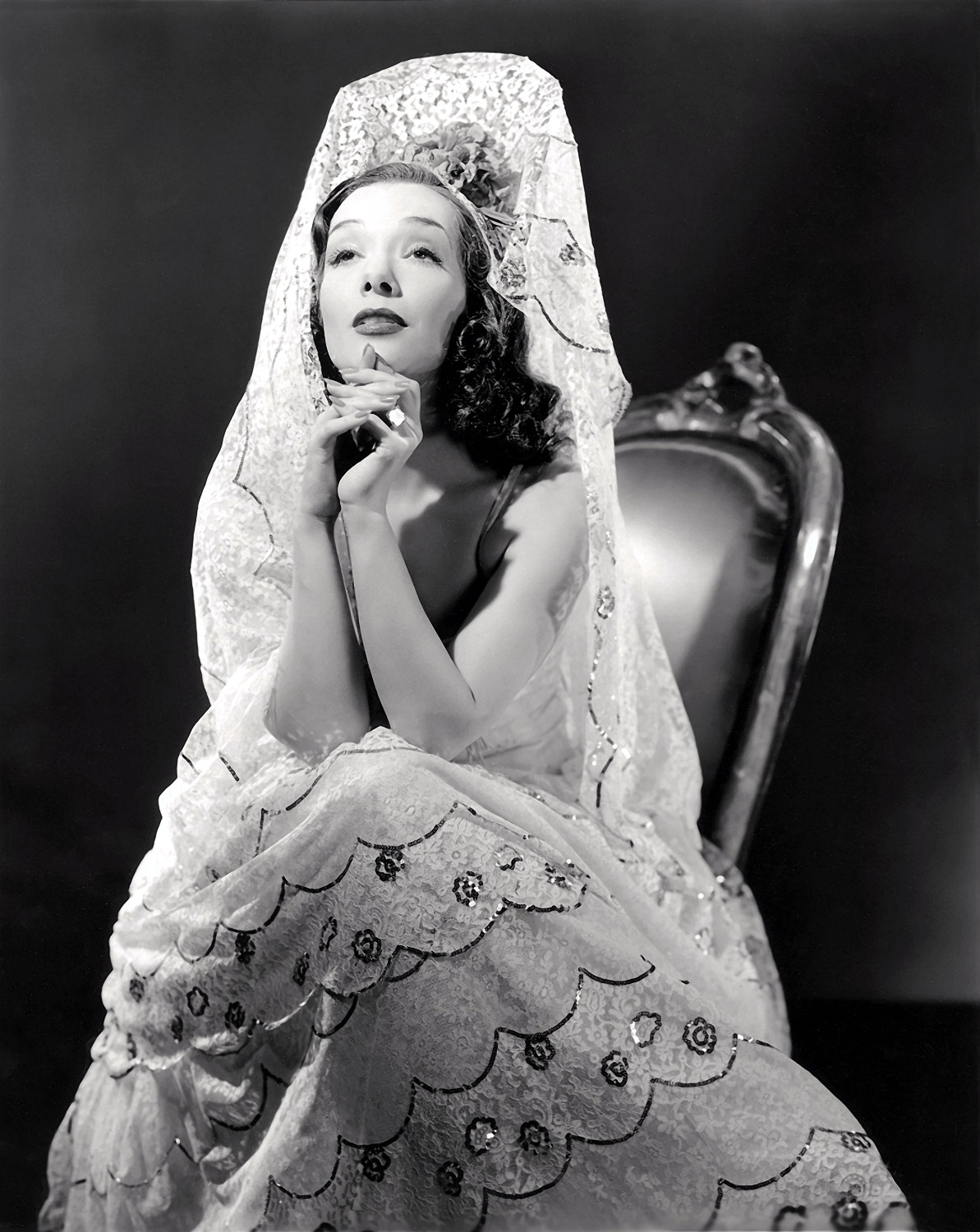
Lupe Vélez

- Lupe Vélez as Carmelita Fuentes
- Donald Woods as Dennis 'Denny' Lindsay
- Leon Errol as Uncle Matthew 'Matt' Lindsay
- Elisabeth Risdon as Aunt Della Lindsay
- Linda Hayes as Elizabeth Price
- Cecil Kellaway as Mr. Chummley
- Charles Coleman as Bosby - the Butler

== Reception ==
Variety called it "a neat concoction of comedy situations; running through many old, but still good, Mack Sennett routines in a zippy and zestful unwinding. Even custard pies and mushy pastries are tossed around with abandon for a rousing climax and a roaring reception."

== Notes ==
"First official entry in the series is a retread of The Girl from Mexico, but shifts focus from bland leading man Woods to hilarious Errol in dual role of Uncle Matt and the tipsy Lord Epping." The film was succeeded by another 6 films:

- Mexican Spitfire Out West (1940)
- The Mexican Spitfire's Baby (1941)
- Mexican Spitfire at Sea (1942)
- Mexican Spitfire Sees a Ghost (1942)
- Mexican Spitfire's Elephant (1942)
- Mexican Spitfire's Blessed Event (1943)
