= Mexican Spitfire (film series) =

Comedy film series by RKO Pictures

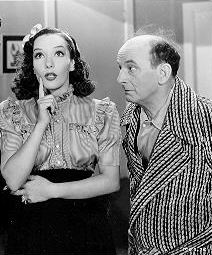
Vélez with Leon Errol in Mexican Spitfire (1940)

Mexican Spitfire refers to a series of eight comedy films released by RKO Pictures between 1940 and 1943 starring Lupe Vélez and Leon Errol. The movies featured the character of Carmelita Fuentes (Lupe Vélez), a sympathetic but temperamental Mexican singer who leaves her career and native country to meet and marry Dennis Lindsay (Donald Woods in the first three, Charles "Buddy" Rogers in the next three, and Walter Reed in the final two), an elegant and handsome American advertising executive.

The series began with the 1939 film The Girl from Mexico, which first introduced Carmelita and the other characters of the series. The premise is based mainly on the culture shock facing Carmelita in her new married life, especially when she gets to know the family and friends of her husband, including his stuffy Aunt Della (Elizabeth Risdon). In the earliest entries, the Lindsays are engaged or newly wed, and Aunt Della strongly disapproves of her nephew's choice; she schemes to reunite Dennis with his former flame, the catty Elizabeth Price (Linda Hayes).

Carmelita finds in her husband's uncle, Matthew "Uncle Matt" Lindsay (Leon Errol), a friend and adventurous accomplice. Matt is sympathetic to Carmelita, and they often share confidences. They both get into trouble from situations usually caused by their scheming and by the volatile temperament of Carmelita. Carmelita also struggles with the American idiom, resulting in frequent malaprops.

The second picture, Mexican Spitfire, introduces the foggy Lord Basil Epping (also Leon Errol), a British distiller with a fondness for tippling. Matt is forced to impersonate the eccentric Lord Epping, almost always when he's elsewhere on the premises. The complications confuse both Epping's wife Lady Ada Epping (Lydia Bilbrook) and his business manager Chumley (Cecil Kellaway). Leon Errol's masquerade became the focal point of the series, and all of the ensuing films had Uncle Matt and Lord Epping in mistaken-identity situations. Dennis's catty girlfriend was written out after the third picture, leaving Dennis and Uncle Matt to become innocently mixed up with attractive women (usually Marion Martin).

The director was always Leslie Goodwins and one of the writers was Charles E. Roberts, both veterans of RKO's short-subject comedy unit. Goodwins and Roberts staged the action very broadly, allowing both Vélez and Errol to improvise freely. Errol in particular offers spontaneous bits, and Vélez openly breaks up on camera. Both cast and crew were very close-knit -- Marion Martin, Eddie Dunn, Charles Coleman, and Tom Kennedy made multiple appearances in multiple roles -- and the atmosphere on the set was always upbeat. At the end of the third film, Mexican Spitfire Out West, hotel house detective Grant Withers shows Leon Errol a moose head and asks, "What should I do with this?" Errol improvises a risqué response and Withers and the crew burst out laughing. Director Goodwins left the scene in the picture.

Despite the constant, predictable repetitions of the basic plotline -- or perhaps because of them -- the Mexican Spitfire series remained popular with moviegoers through 1943. After Lupe Vélez's death, the production unit stayed together to produce domestic farces with surviving co-star Leon Errol. The Errol features lapsed in 1945, although Errol reprised the "Uncle Matt Lindsay" character in the RKO musical comedy Riverboat Rhythm (1946) and the "Lord Epping" character in the two-reel comedy Lord Epping Returns (1951).

== Films in the series ==
- The Girl from Mexico (1939)
- Mexican Spitfire (1940)
- Mexican Spitfire Out West (1940)
- The Mexican Spitfire's Baby (1941)
- Mexican Spitfire at Sea (1942)
- Mexican Spitfire Sees a Ghost (1942)
- Mexican Spitfire's Elephant (1942)
- Mexican Spitfire's Blessed Event (1943)

Each film is not simply a comedy, but a satire of the cultural shock and stereotypes of the Mexican people (and Latin American people in general) in the American society at the time.

== Characters ==
- Names in white rectangles show which actors appeared in each film. A dark grey rectangle indicates that the character did not appear in that film.

Character	Title							
Character	The Girl from Mexico	Mexican Spitfire	Mexican Spitfire Out West	The Mexican Spitfire's Baby	Mexican Spitfire at Sea	Mexican Spitfire Sees a Ghost	Mexican Spitfire's Elephant	Mexican Spitfire's Blessed Event
Carmelita Lindsay, née Fuentes	Lupe Vélez	Lupe Vélez	Lupe Vélez	Lupe Vélez	Lupe Vélez	Lupe Vélez	Lupe Vélez	Lupe Vélez
Uncle Matthew Lindsay	Leon Errol	Leon Errol	Leon Errol	Leon Errol	Leon Errol	Leon Errol	Leon Errol	Leon Errol
Dennis Lindsay	Donald Woods	Donald Woods	Donald Woods	Charles "Buddy" Rogers	Charles "Buddy" Rogers	Charles "Buddy" Rogers	Walter Reed	Walter Reed
Elizabeth Price	Linda Hayes	Linda Hayes	Linda Hayes					
Aunt Della Lindsay	Elisabeth Risdon	Elisabeth Risdon	Elisabeth Risdon	Elisabeth Risdon	Elisabeth Risdon	Elisabeth Risdon	Elisabeth Risdon	Elisabeth Risdon
Lord Basil Epping		Leon Errol	Leon Errol	Leon Errol	Leon Errol	Leon Errol	Leon Errol	Leon Errol
Ponsby, the butler		Charles Coleman	Charles Coleman					Charles Coleman
Mr. Chumley		Cecil Kellaway	Cecil Kellaway	Lloyd Corrigan				
Lady Ada Epping			Lydia Bilbrook	Lydia Bilbrook	Lydia Bilbrook		Lydia Bilbrook	Lydia Bilbrook
Skinner, business rival			Eddie Dunn		Eddie Dunn			
Emily Pepper, playwright				Zasu Pitts	Zasu Pitts			
Fifi				Marion Martin	Marion Martin			

== In popular culture ==
Mexican Spitfire has been compared and contrasted to I Love Lucy. Both feature Latino-Anglo couples, with a sweet troublemaker wife. Lucy reverses the racial makeup, but outbursts of frustrated Spanish from the Latino partner remain a theme.
