= Cliff Reid =

American film producer

- Reid (on the left) receiving the Association of Foreign Correspondents of Hollywood award for Best Picture for 1935's The Informer
- Born: George Clifford Reid; September 7, 1891; Delaware, Ohio, United States
- Died: August 22, 1959 (aged 67); Los Angeles, California, United States
- Occupation: Producer
- Years active: 1921–1946
- Spouse: Mary Reid

Cliff Reid (September 7, 1891 – August 22, 1959), also known as George Clifford Reid, was an American film producer and film production studio founder during the 1930s and 1940s. In addition he also directed film shorts, and was the assistant director on several feature films.

== Life and career ==
Reid was born and raised in Delaware, Ohio, and graduated from high school there. He entered the film industry in the 1910s and worked as a film distributor, before beginning to produce silent films in 1921.

Reid began in the film industry at the very beginning of the sound era, producing and directing film shorts. His first film was The Suppressed Crime, a 1930 mystery short, which was produced by Reid's own company, George Clifford Reid Productions. During 1930 and 1931 Reid's company produced 19 film shorts, which Reid produced and directed. He even wrote one of the shorts, 1931's The Bank Swindle. Reid began working for RKO in 1933; his first assignment for the studio was as the associate producer on The Balloon Buster, with H. Bruce Humberstone directing. There is no record this film was ever finished. Later that year he was tagged by Merian C. Cooper, RKO's V.P. in charge of production, as his envoy to regional sales conventions in Chicago and San Francisco. Reid's first involvement in a feature film being as the associate producer on John Ford's war film, The Lost Patrol. He would work mostly as an associate producer for RKO over the next few years, before being given the producing helm in 1937 on the drama, The Man Who Found Himself, directed by Lew Landers. Reid remained at RKO through 1942 as a producer, his last film for them being an installment of the Mexican Spitfire series, Mexican Spitfire Sees a Ghost. Other notable films on which Reid worked include: the 1935 version of The Three Musketeers; the western The Arizonian, starring Richard Dix; on John Ford's Oscar-winning war film, The Informer, starring Victor McLaglen; and Howard Hawks' 1938 screwball comedy, Bringing Up Baby, starring Cary Grant and Katharine Hepburn;

Reid left RKO after the Mexican Spitfire film, and by 1944 he was part of the stable of producers at Metro-Goldwyn-Mayer. He only worked on a few films at MGM, but they included the John Ford war classic, They Were Expendable, starring John Wayne and Robert Montgomery. His final producing credit would also be at MGM the following year, producing the Norman Taurog drama The Hoodlum Saint, starring William Powell and Esther Williams. He retired after The Hoodlum Saint.

He was married to Mary Reid, and they had at least two children, Clifford Jr. and Marguerite. Clifford Jr. would follow his follow into the film industry, beginning at his father's old studio, RKO, where he was an assistant director to Edward Dmytryk on his classic 1947 Academy Award nominated film, Crossfire.

In 1957, Reid suffered a cerebral hemorrhage and was hospitalized at the Motion Picture House and Hospital. He remained in the hospital for the remainder of his life. Two years later he suffered a heart attack, from which he did not recover. He died at the Motion Picture Hospital in Woodland Hills, California on August 22, 1959, at the age of 67. He was buried at San Fernando Mission Cemetery.

== Filmography - feature films ==
(Per AFI database)

- Red Morning (1934)
- Their Big Moment (1934)
- The Lost Patrol (1934)
- Annie Oakley (1935)
- His Family Tree (1935)
- Grand Old Girl (1935)
- The Three Musketeers (1935)
- Another Face (1935)
- Chasing Yesterday (1935)
- The Arizonian (1935)
- The Informer (1935)
- Powdersmoke Range (1935)
- Strangers All (1935)
- West of the Pecos (1935)
- The Witness Chair (1936)
- Yellow Dust (1936)
- Special Investigator (1936)
- Without Orders (1936)
- Wanted! Jane Turner (1936)
- Behind the Headlines (1937)
- The Plough and the Stars (1937)
- The Man Who Found Himself (1937)
- Criminal Lawyer (1937)
- Hideaway (1937)
- China Passage (1937)
- Crashing Hollywood (1938)
- Blind Alibi (1938)
- Crime Ring (1938)
- The Law West of Tombstone (1938)
- Next Time I Marry (1938)
- This Marriage Business (1938)
- Bringing Up Baby (1938)
- The Great Man Votes (1939)
- Conspiracy (1939)
- Panama Lady (1939)
- Fixer Dugan (1939)
- Almost a Gentleman (1939)
- Sued for Libel (1939)
- Two Thoroughbreds (1939)
- The Girl and the Gambler (1939)
- The Spellbinder (1939)
- Mexican Spitfire Out West (1940)
- Mexican Spitfire (1940)
- Anne of Windy Poplars (1940)
- You Can't Fool Your Wife (1940)
- Laddie (1940)
- Wildcat Bus (1940)
- The Saint's Double Trouble (1940)
- One Crowded Night (1940)
- Lady Scarface (1941)
- The Mexican Spitfire's Baby (1941)
- Play Girl (1941)
- Repent at Leisure (1941)
- The Mayor of 44th Street (1942)
- Mexican Spitfire at Sea (1942)
- Mexican Spitfire Sees a Ghost (1942)
- Powder Town (1942)
- Sing Your Worries Away (1942)
- They Were Expendable (1945)
- The Hoodlum Saint (1946)
