= Charles E. Roberts (writer) =

American filmmaker

- Born: May 22, 1894; Cincinnati, Ohio, United States
- Died: November 10, 1951 (aged 57); Los Angeles, California, United States
- Occupations: Writer, director
- Years active: 1931–1951 (film)

Charles E. Roberts (May 22, 1894 – November 10, 1951) was an American screenwriter and film director. He worked on over a hundred short films and feature films. As a writer he is particularly noted for his work on the Mexican Spitfire series for RKO Pictures. He had previously made a number of two-reel shorts featuring Leon Errol.

== Selected filmography ==
- Western Limited (1932)
- The Flaming Signal (1933)
- Corruption (1933)
- The Woman Who Dared (1933)
- Fighting Hero (1934)
- Fighting Pioneers (1935)
- Roaring Roads (1935)
- Social Error (1935)
- Skybound (1935)
- Adventurous Knights (1935)
- Suicide Squad (1935)
- The Reckless Way (1936)
- Mummy's Boys (1936)
- Millionaire Playboy (1940)
- Mexican Spitfire (1940)
- Mexican Spitfire Out West (1940)
- Pop Always Pays (1940)
- Hurry, Charlie, Hurry (1941)
- The Mexican Spitfire's Baby (1941)
- Mexican Spitfire at Sea (1942)
- Mexican Spitfire Sees a Ghost (1942)
- Mexican Spitfire's Elephant (1942)
- Sing Your Worries Away (1942)
- Ladies' Day (1943)
- Mexican Spitfire's Blessed Event (1943)
- Goin' to Town (1944)
- What a Blonde (1945)
- Mama Loves Papa (1945)
- Vacation in Reno (1946)
- Riverboat Rhythm (1946)
- Partners in Time (1946)
- Cuban Fireball (1951)
- Honeychile (1951)
- Havana Rose (1951)
- Oklahoma Annie (1952)
- The Fabulous Senorita (1952)

== Bibliography ==
- Jewell, Richard B. & Harbin, Vernon. The RKO Story. Arlington House, 1982.
- Vogel, Michelle. Lupe Velez: The Life and Career of Hollywood's "Mexican Spitfire". McFarland, 2012.
