= Riverboat Rhythm =

1946 film by Leslie Goodwins

- Theatrical release poster
- Directed by: Leslie Goodwins
- Screenplay by: Charles E. Roberts
- Story by: Robert Faber
- Produced by: Nat Holt
- Starring: Leon Errol; Glenn Vernon; Walter Catlett; Marc Cramer; Jonathan Hale
- Cinematography: Robert De Grasse
- Edited by: Marvin Coil
- Music by: Roy Webb
- Production company: RKO Pictures
- Distributed by: RKO Pictures
- Release date: February 13, 1946
- Running time: 65 minutes
- Country: United States
- Language: English

Riverboat Rhythm is a 1946 American comedy film directed by Leslie Goodwins and written by Charles E. Roberts. The film stars Leon Errol, Glenn Vernon, Walter Catlett, Joan Newton, Marc Cramer, and Jonathan Hale. The film was released on February 13, 1946, by RKO Radio Pictures.

== Plot ==
Matt Lindsay is the owner of a broken-down showboat, perpetually one small step ahead of his creditors and the law. At one point, he disguises himself as Col. Witherspoon, a con artist he'd met earlier, only to find himself in the middle of a blood feud with Col. Beeler, who aims to settle things once and for all—with a pistol.

== Cast ==
- Leon Errol as Matt Lindsay/Colonel Witherspoon imposter
- Glenn Vernon as John Beeler
- Walter Catlett as Colonel Jeffrey "Smitty" Witherspoon
- Marc Cramer as Lionel Beeler
- Jonathan Hale as Colonel Edward Beeler
- Joan Newton as Midge Lindsay
- Emory Parnell as Sheriff Martin
- Harry Harvey, Sr. as Ezra Beeler
- Florence Lake as Penelope Beeler Witherspoon
- Dorothy Vaughan as Belle Crowley
- Ben Carter as Benjamin
- Mantan Moreland as Mantan
- Frankie Carle and His Orchestra

== Production ==
Riverboat Rhythm was originally conceived in September 1944 as a vehicle for its juvenile musical-comedy team of Glenn Vernon and Marcy McGuire. When RKO suddenly released McGuire, Vernon suggested his erstwhile Broadway co-star Joan Newton to fill McGuire's role. The project was retooled as a Leon Errol comedy along the lines of his Mexican Spitfire features, with Spitfire veterans Charles E. Roberts and Leslie Goodwins writing and directing, respectively. Errol joined the cast in May 1945 as "Matt Lindsay," the familiar character he'd played in the Spitfire comedies, and the script gave him opportunities for mistaken-identity masquerades (a Spitfire hallmark).
