= The Arizonian =

1935 American Western film

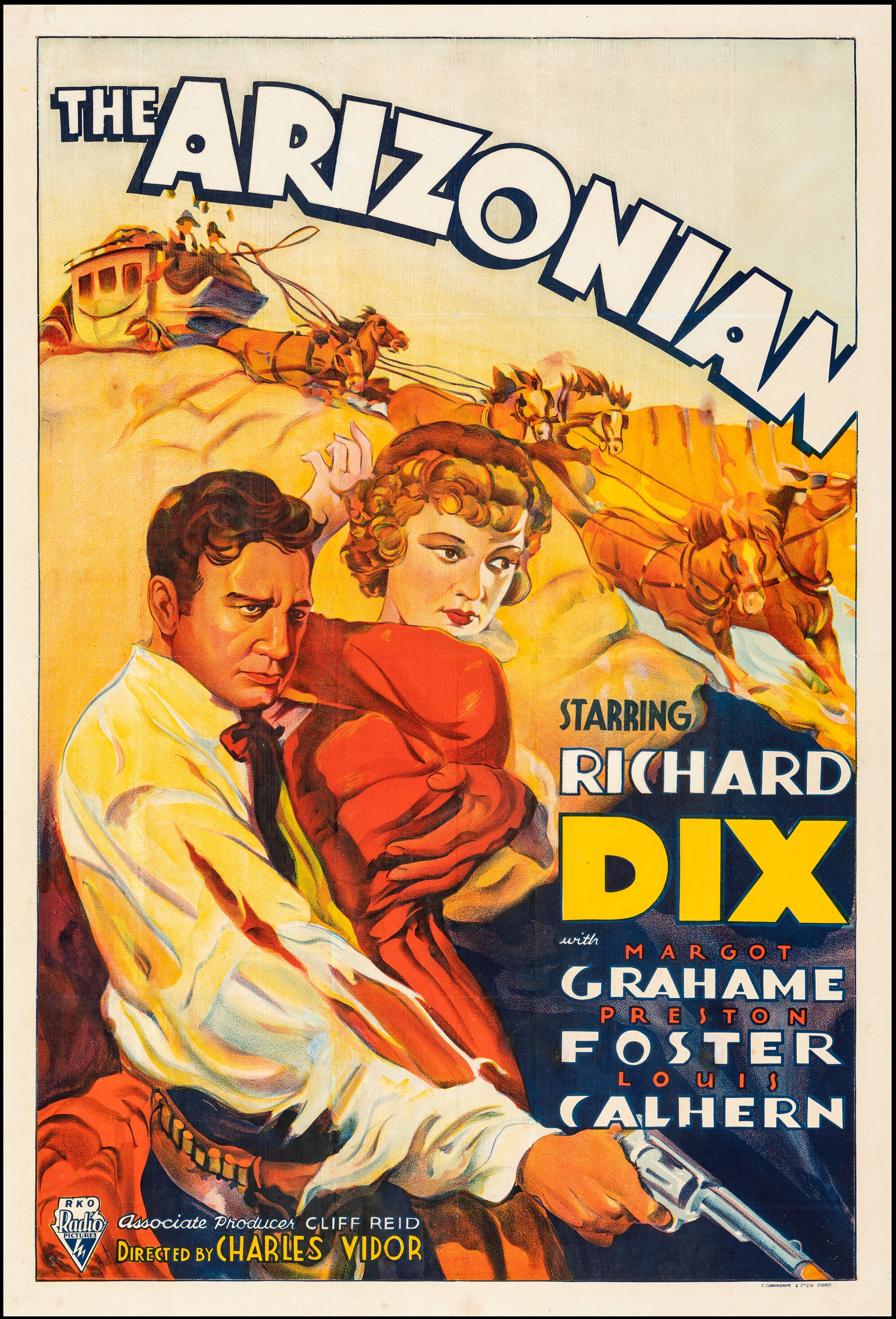
- Theatrical poster for the film
- Directed by: Charles Vidor; Dewey Starkey
- Written by: Dudley Nichols
- Produced by: Cliff Reid
- Starring: Richard Dix; Margot Grahame; Preston Foster; Louis Calhern
- Cinematography: Harold Wenstrom
- Edited by: Jack Hively
- Music by: Roy Webb
- Production company: RKO Pictures
- Distributed by: RKO Radio Pictures
- Release date: June 28, 1935
- Running time: 75 minutes
- Country: United States
- Language: English

The Arizonian is a 1935 American Western film directed by Charles Vidor and starring Richard Dix, Margot Grahame, Preston Foster, and Louis Calhern. The screenplay was by Dudley Nichols. The film was released by RKO Radio Pictures on June 28, 1935.

== Plot ==
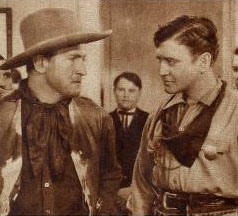
Richard Dix (right) and Joe Sauers (left)

Clay Tallant is on his way to Silver City, Arizona to meet with his brother Orin. As he approaches the town, he stops a stagecoach robbery being attempted by Frank McCloskey and his gang. In intervening, Clay saves Kitty Rivers, a singer in the town's saloon, who is engaged to Orin. In town, the marshal accuses McCloskey of the robbery, after which he is killed by McCloskey, who works for Jake Mannen, the sheriff. Clay is offered the job of marshal by Mayor Ed Comstoc, and he accepts. As he attempts to clean up the town, he runs afoul of Mannen. Clay arrests "Shot-gun" Keeler and the rest of McCloskey's gang, but they are released by the judge, who is on Mannen's payroll. Mannen hires gunman Tex Randolph to dispose of Clay, but this plan backfires when Randolph instead joins Clay and Orin.

Mannen sets up several ambushes in which to kill Clay, but one of them leads to Clay's killing McCloskey. However, eventually Mannen traps Clay, Orin, Tex, and Pompey (their servant) in a burning building. When Pompey makes a break for it to get help, he is gunned down. The three lawmen escape the flames and shoot it out against Mannen's henchmen. When it ends, nearly everyone, including Orin and Tex, lie dead, with Clay as the only one left standing. Then Mannen appears, and he is about to shoot Clay when Sarah, Kitty's servant and Pompey's would-be love interest, shoots and kills Mannen.

Having cleaned up the town, Clay leaves Silver City, taking Kitty and Sarah with him. Kitty had changed her romantic interest from Orin to Clay.

== Cast ==
(cast list as per AFI database)*

- Richard Dix as Clay Tallant
- Margot Grahame as Kitty Rivers
- Preston Foster as Tex Randolph
- Louis Calhern as Sheriff Jake Mannen
- James Bush as Orin Tallant
- Ray Mayer as Frank McCloskey
- Willie Best as Pompey
- Etta McDaniel as Sarah
- Joseph Sauers as Shot-gun Keeler
- Francis Ford as Mayor Ed Comstoc
- Ethan Laidlaw as Henchman (uncredited)
- Edward Van Sloan as Judge Cody (uncredited)

== Production ==
The film was shot from early April to mid-May, 1935, with parts of the film shot at the RKO ranch in Encino, California. Originally titled, Boom Days, towards the end of filming, the title was changed to The Arizonian. By June 6, filming was completed.

The film was released on June 28, 1935.

== Reception ==
The Film Daily gave The Arizonian a good review, calling it a "Western epic with historical background" and giving high marks to Dix's acting, Vidor's direction, and the photography of Wenstrom. Motion Picture Daily, also gave the film a positive review, stating "Routine heroics in every foot make this a superior western". it praised the acting in the film, calling it "excellent", particularly Preston Foster's performance. Another good review was given by the Motion Picture Herald, calling it "entertaining" and "amusing", saying that Dix was ideal in the role, and praising Foster, Calhern, Sauers, and Mayer. Motion Picture Magazine rated the film "AAA" (good), complimenting the plot, action, and acting. Picture Play stated the film was "An out and out Western that has all the essentials of the old ones, yet is more concerned with conversation and character than riding". It called Dix's performance "excellent" and thought Grahame's performance was admirable and interesting, but questioned her being obviously British never was addressed in the film. While the magazine thought the plot was standard, it felt the acting and directing elevated the level of the film.
