= Mexican Spitfire Sees a Ghost =

1942 film by Leslie Goodwins

- Theatrical release poster
- Directed by: Leslie Goodwins
- Screenplay by: Charles E. Roberts; Monte Brice
- Produced by: Cliff Reid
- Starring: Lupe Vélez; Leon Errol; Charles "Buddy" Rogers; Elisabeth Risdon; Donald MacBride; Minna Gombell
- Cinematography: Russell Metty
- Edited by: Theron Warth
- Music by: C. Bakaleinikoff
- Production company: RKO Pictures
- Distributed by: RKO Pictures
- Release date: June 26, 1942
- Running time: 75 minutes
- Country: United States
- Language: English

Mexican Spitfire Sees a Ghost is a 1942 American comedy film directed by Leslie Goodwins and written by Charles E. Roberts and Monte Brice. It is the sequel to the 1942 film Mexican Spitfire at Sea, and the sixth of eight in the franchise. The film stars Lupe Vélez, Leon Errol, Charles "Buddy" Rogers, Elisabeth Risdon, Donald MacBride and Minna Gombell. The film was released on June 26, 1942, by RKO Pictures.

It is notorious as the film representing the top half of a double bill, in which the film at the bottom of the bill was Orson Welles' now-classic second feature film The Magnificent Ambersons, also produced by RKO Pictures.

Carmelita and Uncle Matt find themselves in a haunted house, but the "ghosts" are actually enemy agents who are trying to frighten away visitors in order to develop a nitroglycerin bomb. The troubles begin when, in the absence of Lord Epping, his young partner, Dennis and the latter's Aunt Della open up Eppings' country estate to entertain a pair of visitors who have come from Canada to see the absent-minded nobleman. Unknown to any of them, the cellar of the big house has been taken over by a gang of enemy saboteurs making a supply of nitroglycerin so they can blow up a big dam nearby. Hoping to drive away the guests in order to continue their deadly task, the enemy agents create a number of "ghostly" incidents.

== Cast ==
- Lupe Vélez as Carmelita Lindsay
- Leon Errol as Uncle Matt Lindsay / Lord Basil Epping
- Charles "Buddy" Rogers as Dennis Lindsay
- Elisabeth Risdon as Aunt Della Lindsay
- Donald MacBride as Percy Fitzbadden
- Minna Gombell as Edith Fitzbadden
- Don Barclay as Fingers O'Toole
- John McGuire as Luders
- Lillian Randolph as Hyacinth
- Mantan Moreland as Lightnin'
- Harry Tyler as Bascombe
- Marten Lamont as Mr. Harcourt

== Reception ==
Variety said "Leon Errol's corking, if repetitious, dual comedy impersonation should carry this B programmer through as a supporting feature for satisfactory returns. In essence, it's more like a vaudeville skit in which Errol delivers a 70-minute impersonation of a screwy, comic opera English lord. But it will likely register for a healthy laugh score in the subsequents. Donald MacBride, as another slightly berserk, dyspeptic Englishman with high blood pressure, is teamed up with Errol for some hilarious business."
