= Love, Honor and Oh-Baby! =

- Theatrical release poster
- Directed by: Charles Lamont
- Screenplay by: Clarence Upson Young
- Story by: Elizabeth Troy
- Starring: Wallace Ford; Mona Barrie; Donald Woods; Kathryn Adams Doty; Warren Hymer; Marc Lawrence
- Cinematography: Stanley Cortez
- Edited by: Ted J. Kent
- Production company: Universal Pictures
- Distributed by: Universal Pictures
- Release date: June 7, 1940
- Running time: 59 minutes
- Country: United States
- Language: English

Love, Honor and Oh-Baby! is a 1940 American comedy film directed by Charles Lamont and written by Clarence Upson Young. The film stars Wallace Ford, Mona Barrie, Donald Woods, Kathryn Adams Doty, Warren Hymer and Marc Lawrence. The film was released on June 7, 1940, by Universal Pictures.

== Premise ==
Joe Redmond is a radio reporter investigating Luffo, boss of a murder ring. Brian McGrath is Joe's roommate and he is so depressed he wants to die but because his insurance policy explicitly mentions that collecting of the insurance will be cancelled in case of suicide, he hires Luffo's hitmen to kill him.

== Cast ==
- Wallace Ford as Joe Redmond
- Mona Barrie as Deedee Doree
- Donald Woods as Brian McGrath
- Kathryn Adams Doty as Susan
- Warren Hymer as Bull
- Marc Lawrence as Tony Luffo
- Hobart Cavanaugh as 'Gimpy' Darnell
- Eddy Waller as Panhandler
- Irving Bacon as Taxi Driver
- Frank Puglia as Headwaiter
- Thomas E. Jackson as District Attorney
- Vinton Hayworth as Man with Susan
- Matt McHugh as Taxi Driver
- Robert Frazer as Investigator
- David Oliver as Taxi Driver
