= Pop Always Pays =

1940 film directed by Leslie Goodwins

- Directed by: Leslie Goodwins; Doran Cox (assistant)
- Screenplay by: Charles E. Roberts
- Story by: Arthur J. Beckhard
- Produced by: Bert Gilroy
- Starring: Leon Errol; Dennis O'Keefe; Pamela Blake
- Cinematography: Jack MacKenzie
- Edited by: Desmond Marquette
- Music by: Paul Sawtell
- Production company: RKO Pictures
- Distributed by: RKO Pictures
- Release date: June 21, 1940 (US)
- Running time: 67 minutes
- Country: United States
- Language: English

Pop Always Pays is a 1940 American comedy film directed by Leslie Goodwins using a screenplay by Charles E. Roberts, based on a story by Arthur J. Beckhard. Although not credited in the film, news reports of the time reported that when Goodwins fell ill during the filming, the screenwriter, Roberts, assumed directing duties. The film stars Leon Errol, Dennis O'Keefe, Adele Pearce, and Walter Catlett, and was released by RKO Radio Pictures on June 21, 1940.

== Cast ==
- Leon Errol as Henry Brewster
- Dennis O'Keefe as Jeff Thompson
- Pamela Blake as Edna Brewster
- Walter Catlett as Tommy Lane
- Marjorie Gateson as Mrs. Brewster
- Tom Kennedy as Murphy
- Robert Middlemass as Mr. Oberton
- Effie Anderson as Mary
- Erskine Sanford as John Hayes
- Vivien Oakland as Mrs. Violet Oberton
