= Stand and Deliver (1928 film) =

1928 film by Donald Crisp

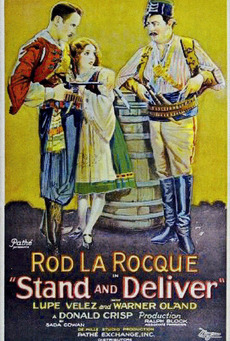
- Film poster
- Directed by: Donald Crisp
- Written by: Sada Cowan (writer); John W. Krafft (intertitles)
- Produced by: Ralph Block; Cecil B. DeMille
- Starring: Rod La Rocque; Lupe Vélez
- Cinematography: David Abel
- Distributed by: Pathé Exchange
- Release date: February 19, 1928
- Running time: 57 minutes
- Country: United States
- Language: Silent (English intertitles)

Stand and Deliver is a 1928 American silent romantic drama film starring Rod La Rocque and Lupe Vélez and directed by Donald Crisp. Cecil B. DeMille produced the picture with release through Pathé Exchange.

== Cast ==
- Rod La Rocque as Roger Norman
- Lupe Vélez as Jania, a Peasant Girl
- Warner Oland as Ghika, Bandit Leader
- Louis Natheaux as Captain Dargia
- Clarence Burton as Captain Melok
- Charles Stevens as Pietro
- James Dime as Patch Eye
- Frank Lanning as Pietro
- Alexander Palasthy as Juja
- Bernard Siegel as Blind Operator
- Donald Crisp as London Club Member

== Preservation ==
Prints of the film are preserved at the George Eastman Museum and the UCLA Film & Television Archive.
