= Mexican Spitfire Out West =

- Directed by: Leslie Goodwins
- Screenplay by: Charles E. Roberts; Jack Townley
- Story by: Charles E. Roberts
- Produced by: Lee S. Marcus; Cliff Reid
- Starring: Lupe Vélez; Leon Errol; Donald Woods; Elisabeth Risdon; Cecil Kellaway
- Cinematography: Jack MacKenzie
- Edited by: Desmond Marquette
- Music by: Roy Webb
- Production company: RKO Radio Pictures
- Distributed by: RKO Radio Pictures
- Release date: November 29, 1940
- Running time: 76 minutes
- Country: United States
- Language: English

Mexican Spitfire Out West is a 1940 American comedy film directed by Leslie Goodwins and written by Charles E. Roberts and Jack Townley. It is the sequel to the 1940 film Mexican Spitfire. The film stars Lupe Vélez, Leon Errol, Donald Woods, Elisabeth Risdon, and Cecil Kellaway. The film was released on November 29, 1940, by RKO Radio Pictures.

== Plot ==
The story and characters continue where the previous film Mexican Spitfire left off. Newlyweds Carmelita and Dennis Lindsay are settling into their Manhattan apartment, much to the approval of Dennis's uncle Matt and much to the disgust of Matt's wife Della. Della thinks it isn't too late to send Carmelita away and marry Dennis off to his former flame Elizabeth Price. On the business front, advertising man Dennis is anxious to land a new client, British distiller Lord Basil Epping.

Carmelita, furious with Dennis for his preoccupation with business, goes to Reno for a divorce. Uncle Matt follows her and tries to keep Dennis's competitor off-balance by masquerading as Lord Epping, so the real Lord Epping can sign with Dennis. This backfires in short order, as Uncle Matt is constantly mistaken for Lord Epping at the hotel, and the genuine Lord Epping can't account for the frequent mistaken identities. Things come to a head when Lady Epping arrives, and Aunt Della descends upon the hotel, further confusing matters.

== Cast ==
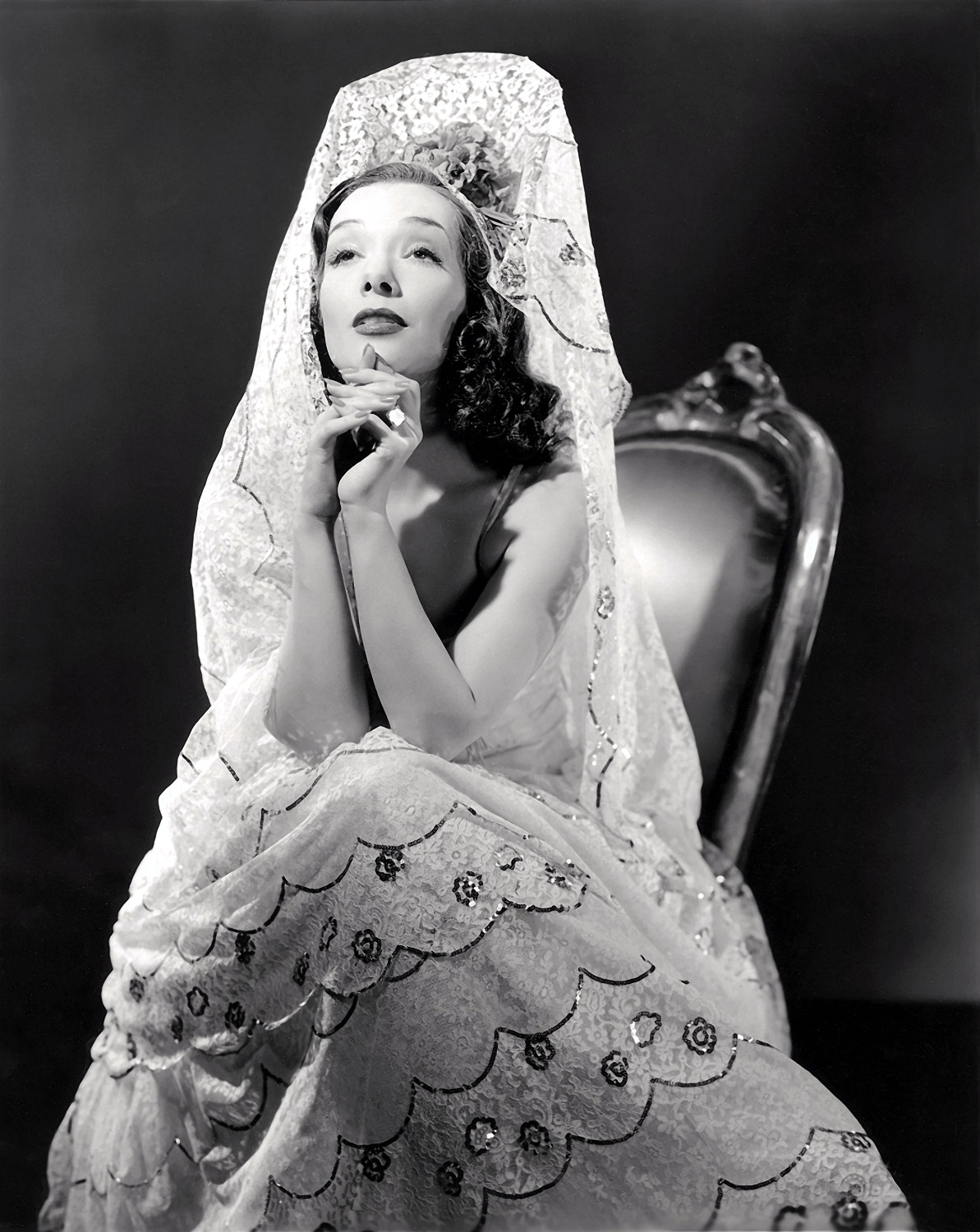
Publicity still of Lupe Vélez

- Lupe Vélez as Carmelita Lindsay
- Leon Errol as Uncle Matt Lindsay / Lord Basil Epping
- Donald Woods as Dennis Lindsay
- Elisabeth Risdon as Aunt Della Lindsay
- Cecil Kellaway as Mr. Chumley, Epping's assistant
- Linda Hayes as Elizabeth Price
- Lydia Bilbrook as Lady Ada Epping
- Charles Coleman as Ponsby, the butler
- Charles Quigley as Mr. Roberts
- Lester Dorr as Harry
- Eddie Dunn as Mr. Skinner, competitor
- Grant Withers as the hotel detective
- Tom Kennedy as taxi driver

== Production ==
While making the film in August 1940, it was announced Velez was signed to do four more "Spitfire" movies.

== Reception ==
Trade reviewers greeted the film as one of the funniest of the year. Boxoffice: "It assays high in hilarity, due not only to Errol's drollery in a dual role but also because of [an] ingeniously concocted farce script. It should set laugh records among fans of the slapstick school." The Exhibitor: "This is the funniest of the Spitfire series, and had the preview audience howling with laughter, drowning out much of the dialogue." Film Daily: "Surefire for laughs netted by comedy that moves along at a fine tempo... Direction by Leslie Goodwins is outstanding." Motion Picture Herald: "Mexican Spitfire Out West was greeted with hilarity bordering on hysterics by the preview audience in Los Angeles... the seats prevented the audience from rolling in the aisles."

Variety said Errol delivers a "smash characterisation" but disliked the film.
