= Donald Woods (actor) =

American actor (1906–1998)

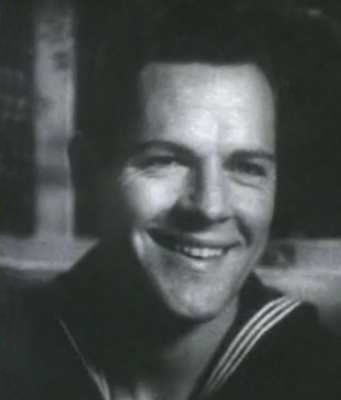
- in Sea Devils (1937)
- Born: Ralph Lewis Zink; December 2, 1906; Brandon, Manitoba, Canada
- Died: March 5, 1998 (aged 91); Palm Springs, California, U.S.
- Resting place: Forest Lawn Cemetery (Cathedral City)
- Occupation: Actor
- Spouse: Josephine Van der Horck (m. 1933)
- Children: 2
- Relatives: Russ Conway (brother)

Donald Woods (born Ralph Lewis Zink; December 2, 1906 – March 5, 1998) was a Canadian-American film and television actor whose career in Hollywood spanned six decades.

== Life and career ==
Woods was born in Manitoba and was raised in California. His parents were William and Margaret Zink, Presbyterians of German descent. His younger brother, Clarence Russell Zink, also became an actor (Russ Conway).

Woods graduated from the University of California, Berkeley, and began his career in West Coast stock theater.

He made his film debut in 1928. His screen career was spent mostly in B movies, for example as lawyer Perry Mason in the 1937 film The Case of the Stuttering Bishop. He also played romantic leads in B comedies, notably the popular Mexican Spitfire series opposite Lupe Velez.

He also occasionally played major roles in bigger feature films like A Tale of Two Cities (1935), Anthony Adverse (1936), If I Had My Way (1940, as a doomed bridge worker), Watch on the Rhine (1943), The Bridge of San Luis Rey (1944), and Roughly Speaking (1945). In 1945 he co-starred in the Christmas-themed parable Star in the Night, as a hitchhiker who awakens a stone-hearted innkeeper to the true spirit of Christmas. Woods's sensitive performance attracted attention, and the film won the "Best Short Subject" Academy Award.

Of considerable importance to Donald Woods's acting career were several seasons as leading man with the Elitch Gardens Theatre Company in Denver, Colorado, where he performed in 1932, 1933, 1939, 1941, 1947, and 1948.

In the early days of television, Woods starred in "It's Only a Game", the October 17, 1950, episode of Armstrong Circle Theatre. He starred as the title character in the 1951 syndicated TV series Craig Kennedy, Criminologist, and he was the host of Damon Runyon Theater on CBS-TV. He played himself on the dramatic series Hotel Cosmopolitan, also on CBS, and he was one of three hosts of The Orchid Award on ABC-TV. He portrayed Walter Manning on Portia Faces Life on CBS.

He also appeared in such anthology series as The Philco Television Playhouse, Armstrong Circle Theatre, Robert Montgomery Presents, The United States Steel Hour, Crossroads, and General Electric Theater. On April 11, 1961, Woods appeared as "Professor Landfield" in the episode "Two for the Gallows" on NBC's Laramie western series. Series character Slim Sherman (John Smith) is hired under false pretenses to take Landfield into the Badlands to seek gold. Landfield, however, is really Morgan Bennett, a member of the former Henry Plummer gang who has escaped from prison. Slim has no idea that Landfield is seeking the loot that his gang had hidden away. Series character Jess Harper (Robert Fuller), Pete Dixon, played by Warren Oates, and Pete's younger brother soon come to Slim's aid. The title stems from the talk that the undisciplined Dixon brothers might eventually wind up in a hangman's noose.

Woods later was a regular in the role of John Brent on the short-lived series Tammy and made guest appearances on Bat Masterson, Wagon Train, Ben Casey, 77 Sunset Strip, Hawaiian Eye, Stoney Burke, Bourbon Street Beat, Bonanza, Coronet Blue, Ironside, Alias Smith and Jones, The Wild Wild West and Owen Marshall: Counselor at Law, among many others before retiring from acting in 1976.

Besides his film career, he also worked as a successful real estate broker in Palm Springs, California, where he lived with his wife, childhood sweetheart Josephine Van der Horck. They were married from 1933 until his death and had two children, Linda and Conrad. He was interred at the Forest Lawn Cemetery in Cathedral City, California.

== Partial filmography ==
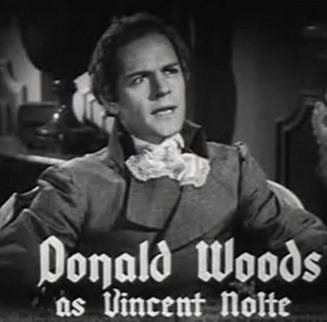
Woods in Anthony Adverse (1936)

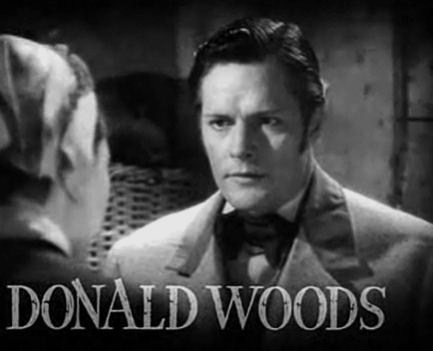
Woods in The White Angel (1936)

- As the Earth Turns (1934) – Stan
- Merry Wives of Reno (1934) – Frank
- Fog Over Frisco (1934) – Tony
- Charlie Chan's Courage (1934) – Bob Crawford
- She Was a Lady (1934) – Tommy Traill
- Sweet Adeline (1934) – Sid Barnett
- The Florentine Dagger (1935) – Juan Cesare
- The Case of the Curious Bride (1935) – Carl
- Stranded (1935) – John Wesley
- Frisco Kid (1935) – Charles Ford
- A Tale of Two Cities (1935) – Charles Darnay
- The Story of Louis Pasteur (1936) – Dr. Jean Martel
- Road Gang (1936) – James 'Jim' Larrabie
- The White Angel (1936) – Charles Cooper
- Anthony Adverse (1936) – Vincent Nolte
- A Son Comes Home (1936) – Denny
- Isle of Fury (1936) – Eric Blake
- Once a Doctor (1937) – Dr.Steven Brace
- Sea Devils (1937) – Steve Webb
- The Case of the Stuttering Bishop (1937) – Perry Mason
- Talent Scout (1937) – Steve Stewart
- Charlie Chan on Broadway (1937) – Speed Patten
- Big Town Girl (1937) – Mark Tracey
- The Black Doll (1938) – Nick Halstead
- Romance on the Run (1938) – Barry Drake
- Danger on the Air (1938) – Benjamin Franklin Butts
- Beauty for the Asking (1939) – Jeffrey Martin
- The Girl from Mexico (1939) – Dennis 'Denny' Lindsay
- Heritage of the Desert (1939) – John Abbott
- Mexican Spitfire (1940) – Dennis Lindsay
- City of Chance (1940) – Steve Walker
- Forgotten Girls (1940) – Dan Donahue
- If I Had My Way (1940) – Fred Johnson
- Love, Honor and Oh-Baby! (1940) – Brian McGrath
- Mexican Spitfire Out West (1940) – Dennis 'Denny' Lindsay
- Sky Raiders (1941) – Captain Bob Dayton / John Kane
- Bachelor Daddy (1941) – Edward Smith
- I Was a Prisoner on Devil's Island (1941) – Joel Grant / Joseph Elmer
- Thru Different Eyes (1942) – Ted Farnsworth
- The Gay Sisters (1942) – Penn Sutherland Gaylord
- Corregidor (1943) – Dr. Michael
- Watch on the Rhine (1943) – David Farrelly
- So's Your Uncle (1943) – Steve Curtis a.k.a. Uncle John
- Hi'ya, Sailor (1943) – Bob Jackson
- The Bridge of San Luis Rey (1944) – Brother Juniper
- Enemy of Women (1944) – Dr. Hans Traeger, MD
- Hollywood Canteen (1944) – Donald Woods
- Roughly Speaking (1945) – Rodney Crane
- God Is My Co-Pilot (1945) – (uncredited)
- Wonder Man (1945) – Monte Rossen
- Star in the Night (1945) – Hitchhiker
- Night and Day (1946) – Ward Blackburn
- Never Say Goodbye (1946) – Rex DeVallon
- The Time, the Place and the Girl (1946) – Martin Drew
- Bells of San Fernando (1947) – Michael 'Gringo' O'Brien
- Stepchild (1947) – Ken Bullock
- The Return of Rin Tin Tin (1947) – Father Matthew
- Daughter of the West (1949) – Commissioner Ralph C. Connors
- Barbary Pirate (1949) – Maj. Tom Blake
- Scene of the Crime (1949) – Bob Herkimer
- Free for All (1949) – Roger Abernathy
- Johnny One-Eye (1950) – Vet
- The Lost Volcano (1950) – Paul Gordon
- Mr. Music (1950) – Tippy Carpenter
- The Du Pont Story (1950) – Irénée du Pont
- All That I Have (1951) – Pastor William Goodwin
- Born to the Saddle (1953) – Matt Daggett
- The Beast from 20,000 Fathoms (1953) – Capt. Phil Jackson
- I'll Give My Life (1960) – Pastor Goodwin
- 13 Ghosts (1960) – Cyrus Zorba
- Five Minutes to Live (1961) – Ken Wilson
- Kissin' Cousins (1964) – General Alvin Donford
- Moment to Moment (1965) – Mr. Singer
- Dimension 5 (1966) – Kane
- Tammy and the Millionaire (1967) – John Brent
- A Time to Sing (1968) – Vernon Carter
- True Grit (1969) – 'Barlow'
- Sweet Revenge (1976) – Car Salesman (uncredited)

== Television ==
Year	Title	Role	Notes
1951	Craig Kennedy, Criminologist	Craig Kennedy	Starring role
1965-1988	Tammy	John Brent	Recurring role
1972	Alias Smith and Jones	Halberstam	S2:E19, "The Biggest Game in the West"

Ferguson.... a government agent sent by President Chester A. Arthur.. to Tombstone to investigate crime.. in season 3 episode 4.."THE WRITER"..
