= Six Lessons from Madame La Zonga =

1941 film by John Rawlins

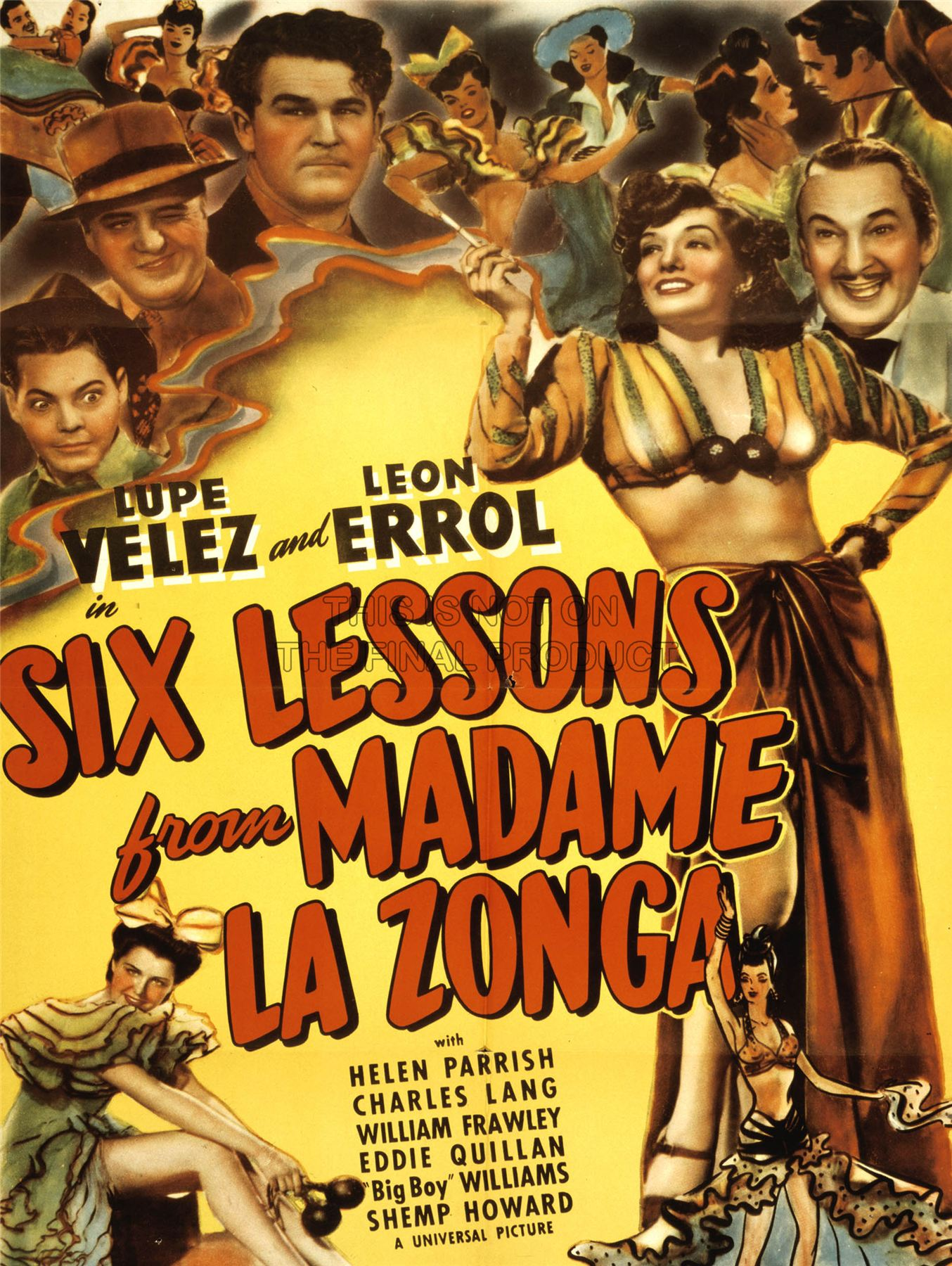
- Promotional poster for the film.
- Directed by: John Rawlins
- Written by: Ben Chapman; Larry Rhine
- Produced by: Joseph Gershenson
- Starring: Lupe Vélez; Leon Errol; William Frawley
- Cinematography: John W. Boyle
- Edited by: Edward Curtiss
- Music by: Everett Carter; Milton Rosen
- Production company: Universal Pictures
- Distributed by: Universal Pictures
- Release date: January 17, 1941
- Running time: 62 minutes
- Country: United States
- Language: English

Six Lessons from Madame La Zonga is a 1941 American comedy film directed by John Rawlins and starring Lupe Vélez, Leon Errol, William Frawley and Helen Parrish. It was produced and distributed by Universal Pictures. The film was inspired by the same-name song interpreted by Helen O'Connell and Jimmy Dorsey Orchestra.

== Plot ==
Aboard a luxury liner sailing for Cuba are a band of struggling musicians led by Steve Morrison along with a number of swindlers, one named Beheegan and another a pair of con artists passing themselves off as Señor and Rosita Alvarez, phony names.

Another passenger is Madame La Zonga, whose nightclub in Havana has been closed. She is looking for money to put the club back in business, but must avoid being fleeced by her shipmates and also must avoid the police, who are waiting for the boat at the dock. She disguises herself as a steward to disembark safely.

Alvarez attempts to have "Rosita" sing at the club, but eventually are arrested for their nefarious schemes. Madame La Zonga has a successful grand reopening, with Steve and his band the featured performers.

== Cast ==
- Lupe Vélez as Madame La Zonga
- Leon Errol as Señor Alvarez / Mike Clancy
- William Frawley as Beheegan
- Helen Parrish as Rosita Alvarez
- Charles Lang as Steve Morrison
- Shemp Howard as Gabby
- Eddie Quillan as Skat
- Guinn "Big Boy" Williams as Alvin
- Danny Beck as Danny
- Frank Mitchell as Maxwell
- Johnny Bond as Pony
- Richard Reinhart as Tex
- Jimmy Wakely as Jim
- Wade Boteler as Wade Boteler
- Eddie Acuff as Steward

== Bibliography ==
- Golden, Eve. Strictly Dynamite: The Sensational Life of Lupe Velez. University Press of Kentucky, 2023.
- Roberts, John Storm. The Latin Tinge: The Impact of Latin American Music on the United States. Oxford University Press, 1999.
