= Nana (1944 film) =

1944 film by Roberto Gavaldón, Celestino Gorostiza

- Directed by: Roberto Gavaldón; Celestino Gorostiza
- Written by: Émile Zola; Celestino Gorostiza
- Produced by: Alberto Sanatnder
- Starring: Lupe Vélez; Miguel Ángel Ferriz; Luis Alcoriza
- Cinematography: Alex Phillips
- Edited by: Charles L. Kimball
- Music by: Jorge Pérez
- Release date: June 2, 1944
- Running time: 87 minutes
- Country: Mexico
- Language: Spanish

Nana is a 1944 Mexican film by Celestino Gorostiza and Roberto Gavaldón. The film is an adaptation of Émile Zola's 1880 novel Nana, and is the last film of the Mexican star Lupe Vélez.

== Plot ==
Based in the Émile Zola novel of the same name, which details the life of Nana, a French prostitute of the 19th century.

== Cast ==
- Lupe Vélez as Nana
- Miguel Ángel Ferriz as Muffat
- Chela Castro as Rosa Mignon
- Crox Alvarado as Fontan
- Luis Alcoriza as De Fauchery
- Conchita Gentil Arcos as Zoe

== Production notes ==
This was the last movie for Lupe Vélez, who committed suicide later the same year.

There was a second Mexican adaptation of Nana, also called Nana, in 1985, produced by and starring Irma Serrano.
