= The Cuban Love Song =

1931 film

- Theatrical release poster
- Directed by: W.S. Van Dyke
- Screenplay by: C. Gardner Sullivan; Bess Meredyth; John Lynch; John Colton; Gilbert Emery; Robert E. Hopkins; Paul Hervey Fox
- Produced by: Albert Lewin
- Starring: Lawrence Tibbett; Lupe Vélez; Ernest Torrence; Karen Morley; Jimmy Durante
- Cinematography: Harold Rosson
- Edited by: Margaret Booth
- Music by: Herbert Stothart
- Production company: Metro-Goldwyn-Mayer
- Distributed by: Loew's Inc.
- Release date: December 5, 1931
- Running time: 86 minutes
- Country: United States
- Language: English

The Cuban Love Song is a 1931 American pre-Code musical film directed by W.S. Van Dyke and written by C. Gardner Sullivan, Bess Meredyth, John Lynch, John Colton, Gilbert Emery, Robert E. Hopkins and Paul Hervey Fox. The film stars Lawrence Tibbett, Lupe Vélez, Ernest Torrence, Jimmy Durante, Karen Morley and Louise Fazenda. The film was released on December 5, 1931 by Metro-Goldwyn-Mayer.

It was the last of four films that the baritone Tibbett made for MGM following the introduction of sound film. The film received a generally favorable critical reception, but suffered badly at the box office. Nonetheless two of the film's songs, "The Cuban Love Song" and "El Manisero", were major hits.

== Plot ==
Shortly after becoming engaged to a socialite, an upper-class American named Terry enlists in the U.S. Marine Corps to get his wild urges out of his system. He and his two friends and comrades get into many scrapes, frequently ending up in the brig. While in Cuba, he falls in love with Nenita, a spirited young woman who sells peanuts from a small cart on the street.

Their relationship is interrupted by America's entry into World War I, and Terry is wounded in the fighting in France. He is nursed back to health by his fiancée, and the two marry. More than a decade later, Terry bumps into his former comrades in New York. This reawakens memories of his carefree days in Cuba. He returns to Havana to find Nenita, only to discover that she has died of fever. However he encounters a boy named Terry, who he realizes is the product of his passionate relationship with Nenita a decade earlier. He adopts the boy and takes him back to the United States where his wife generously welcomes both father and son home.

== Cast ==
- Lawrence Tibbett as Terry
- Lupe Vélez as Nenita
- Ernest Torrence as Romance
- Jimmy Durante as O.O. Jones
- Karen Morley as Crystal
- Louise Fazenda as Elvira
- Hale Hamilton as John
- Mathilde Comont as Aunt Rose

== Songs ==
- 'Tramps at Sea' and 'The Cuban Love Song' by Dorothy Fields, Jimmy McHugh and Herbert Stothart
- 'El Manisero (The Peanut Vendor)' by Moïse Simons
- 'Buche y pluma na’ ma' by Rafael Hernández

== Bibliography ==
- Michelle Vogel. Lupe Velez: The Life and Career of Hollywood's "Mexican Spitfire". McFarland, 2012.
