= Leon Errol =

Australian-American actor and comedian (1881–1951)

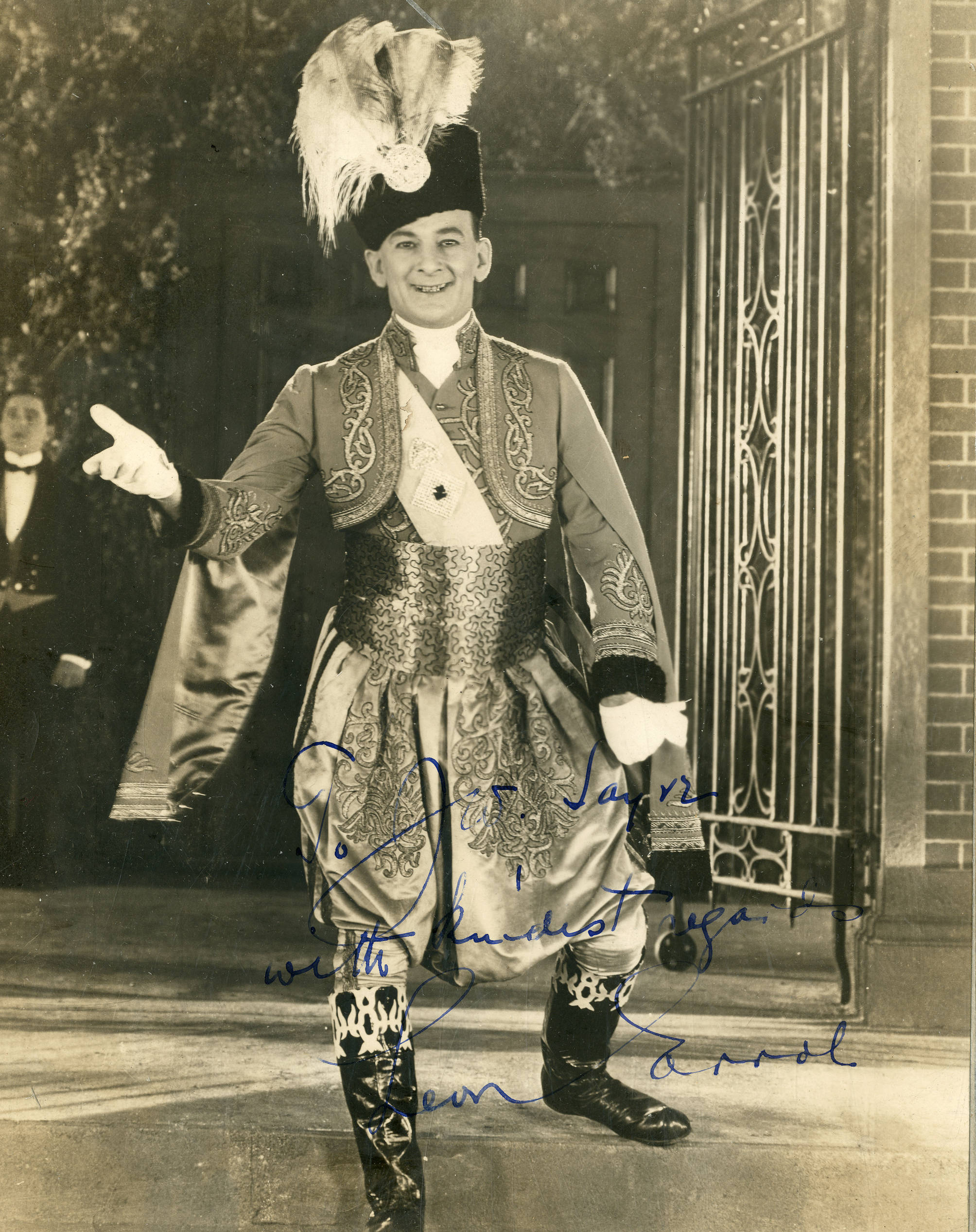
- Errol in 1925
- Born: Leonce Errol Sims; July 3, 1881; Sydney, New South Wales, Australia
- Died: October 12, 1951 (aged 70); Los Angeles, California, U.S.
- Education: University of Sydney
- Occupation: Actor
- Years active: 1911–1951
- Spouse: Stella Chatelaine (m. 1906, d. 1946)

Leon Errol (born Leonce Errol Sims, July 3, 1881 – October 12, 1951) was an Australian-American comedian and actor in the United States, popular in the first half of the 20th century for his appearances in vaudeville, on Broadway, and in films.

== Early years ==
Errol was born in Sydney to Joseph and Elizabeth Sims, and studied medicine at the University of Sydney. After he wrote material for, directed, and acted in the university's annual play, his interests changed to entertaining.

== Career ==
Errol toured Australia, New Zealand and Great Britain and Ireland in a variety of theatrical settings, including circuses, operettas, and Shakespeare. According to his petition for naturalization (1914), he first came to the United States in 1898, having arrived at the Port of San Francisco. By 1905, he managed a touring vaudeville company troupe in Portland, Oregon, giving an early boost to the career of a young comedian named Roscoe Arbuckle. In 1908, he settled permanently in the United States.

By 1911, Errol had made it to Broadway in the Ziegfeld Follies, notably in two skits with the legendary Bert Williams. Errol's sister, Leda Errol (née Sims) was a personal friend of Ziegfeld Follies star Fanny Brice, and she appeared with him in the Ziegfeld Follies doing one- and two-act plays. He appeared every year in the Follies through 1915, when he is also credited as director of the show that included W.C. Fields, Ed Wynn, as well as Marion Davies as one of the Ziegfeld Girls.

While balancing vaudeville appearances and a dozen Broadway shows, like the original 1920 production of Jerome Kern's Sally, Errol achieved the pinnacle of vaudeville success: headlining at the Palace.

== Films ==
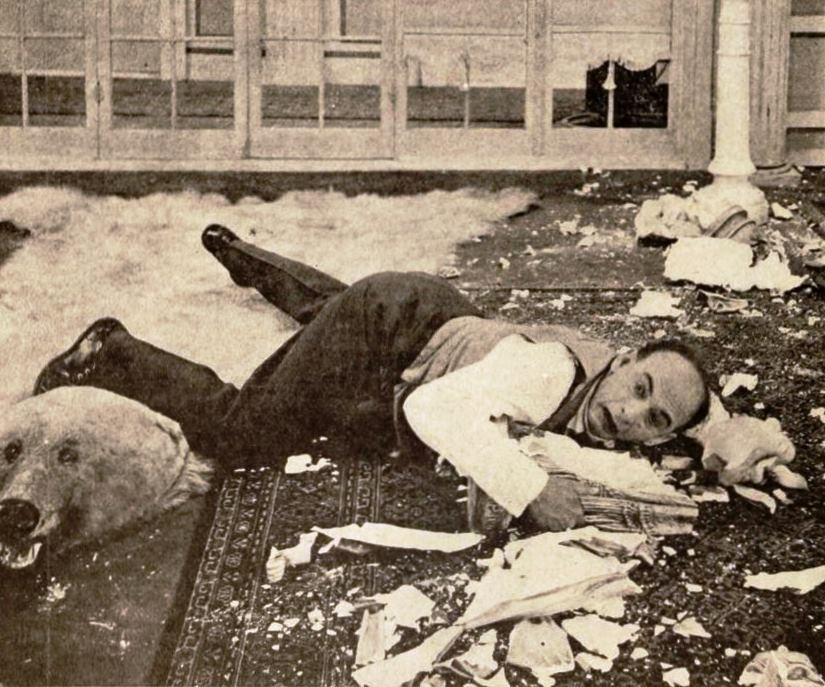
In a short silent comedy, Buggins (1920)

In 1916, Errol made his first film, a comic short subject titled Nearly Spliced, though it was not released until 1921, for pioneering east-coast producer George Kleine. Errol left Broadway and went to Hollywood, appearing in Sally and Clothes Make the Pirate alongside Dorothy Gish (both 1925). He was third-billed for Samuel Goldwyn's One Heavenly Night in 1931. The box-office for that film was disappointing, but overall Errol made a smooth transition to films in a variety of comedy roles. His comic trademark was a wobbly, unsteady walk, moving as though on rubber legs; this bit served him well in drunk routines.

In 1933, Errol starred in a series of comedy short subjects for Columbia Pictures; the following year, at Warner Bros., he starred in two pioneering three-strip Technicolor shorts, Service with a Smile (released July 28, 1934) and Good Morning, Eve! (September 22, 1934), the former beating the RKO Radio Pictures release La Cucaracha by five weeks as the first live action, all-Technicolor release.

In 1934, Errol moved to RKO Radio Pictures where he would star in six shorts per year until his death in 1951. Most of these were marital farces in which Leon would get mixed up with a pretty girl or an involved business proposition, and face the wrath of his wife (usually Dorothy Granger); the theme song to the series was the nursery rhyme London Bridge Is Falling Down.

Errol is well remembered for his energetic performances in the Mexican Spitfire movie series (1939–43) starring Lupe Vélez; Errol appeared in the recurring dual role of affable Uncle Matt and foggy British nobleman Lord Epping. After Vélez's suicide in 1944, RKO kept the Spitfire unit intact to produce domestic farces starring Errol.

Universal Pictures cast Leon Errol often from 1941 to 1945. He was featured in 14 musical-comedy films, as well as in the W. C. Fields comedy Never Give a Sucker an Even Break (1941) and the thriller The Invisible Man's Revenge (1944).

Monogram Pictures signed Errol to appear as fight manager Knobby Walsh in eight of its "Joe Palooka" sports comedies (1946–1950), one of which cast Errol as Lord Poole, a thinly disguised version of Lord Epping.

On February 4, 1950, Errol appeared on television as a guest on The Ed Wynn Show, broadcast live to the West Coast and seen on kinescope film to the East and Midwest on February 18, 1950.

Lord Epping Returns (1951), Errol's next-to-last film, reprised his famous characterization (and some of the gags) introduced in the 1939 feature Mexican Spitfire.

Footage from Errol's short subjects was incorporated into RKO's compilation features Variety Time, Make Mine Laughs, Footlight Varieties, and Merry Mirthquakes. RKO kept Errol in the public eye by reissuing his older comedies throughout the 1950s. His RKO shorts soon became a staple of television syndication.

== Personal life ==
Errol married Stella Chatelaine in 1906 in Denver, Colorado. She died on November 7, 1946, in Los Angeles. They had no children.

== Death ==
On October 12, 1951, Errol died from a heart attack at Good Samaritan Hospital in Hollywood. He was 70. He was interred at Forest Lawn Memorial Park in Glendale.

== Recognition ==
Errol has a star at 6801 Hollywood Boulevard on the Hollywood Walk of Fame. It was dedicated on February 8, 1960.

Leonard Maltin stated, "Errol convulsed stage and screen audiences". Leslie Halliwell praised the little actor "For bringing a breath of inspired vaudeville to some pretty tired Hollywood formats, and for inventing Lord Epping."

== Partial filmography ==
- Yolanda (1924) - Innkeeper
- Sally (1925) - Duke of Checkergovinia
- Clothes Make the Pirate (1925) - Tremble-at-Evil Tidd
- The Lunatic at Large (1927) - Sam Smith
- Paramount on Parade (1930) - Leon Errol / Master of Ceremonies / (In a Hospital)
- Only Saps Work (1930) - James Wilson
- One Heavenly Night (1931) - Otto
- Finn and Hattie (1931) - Finley P. Haddock
- Her Majesty, Love (1931) - Baron von Schwarzdorf
- Alice in Wonderland (1933) - Uncle Gilbert
- We're Not Dressing (1934) - Hubert
- The Notorious Sophie Lang (1934) - Stubbs
- Service with a Smile (1934) - Walter Webb (Technicolor short subject)
- Good Morning, Eve! (1934) - Adam (Technicolor short subject)
- The Captain Hates the Sea (1934) - Layton
- Princess O'Hara (1935) - Last Card Louie
- Coronado (1935) - Otto Wray
- Should Wives Work? (1937) - Brennan
- The Girl from Mexico (1939) - Uncle Matthew "Matt" Lindsay (first of the Mexican Spitfire series)
- Career (1939) - Mudcat
- Dancing Co-Ed (1939) - 'Pops' Marlow
- Mexican Spitfire (1940) - Uncle Matt Lindsay / Lord Basil Epping
- Pop Always Pays (1940) - Henry Brewster
- The Golden Fleecing (1940) - Uncle Waldo Blake
- Mexican Spitfire Out West (1940) - Uncle Matt Lindsay / Lord Basil Epping
- Where Did You Get That Girl? (1941) - Alex MacDevin
- Six Lessons from Madame La Zonga (1941) - Mike Clancy / Papa Alvarez
- Hurry, Charlie, Hurry (1941) - Daniel Jennings Boone
- Moonlight in Hawaii (1941) - Walter Spencer
- Never Give a Sucker an Even Break (1941) - Leon, W. C. Fields's rival
- The Mexican Spitfire's Baby (1941) - Uncle Matt Lindsay / Lord Basil Epping
- Melody Lane (1941) - McKenzie
- Mexican Spitfire at Sea (1942) - Uncle Matt Lindsay / Lord Basil Epping
- Mexican Spitfire Sees a Ghost (1942) - Uncle Matt Lindsay / Lord Basil Epping
- Mexican Spitfire's Elephant (1942) - Uncle Matt Lindsay / Lord Basil Epping
- Strictly in the Groove (1942) - Carter B. Durham
- Follow the Band (1943) - Big Mike O'Brien
- Cowboy in Manhattan (1943) - Hank
- Gals, Incorporated (1943) - Cornelius Rensington III
- Mexican Spitfire's Blessed Event (1943) - Uncle Matt Lindsay / Lord Basil Epping
- Higher and Higher (1943) - Cyrus Drake
- Hat Check Honey (1944) - 'Happy' Dan Briggs
- Slightly Terrific (1944) - James P. Tuttle / John P. Tuttle
- Twilight on the Prairie (1944) - Cactus (ranch foreman)
- The Invisible Man's Revenge (1944) - Herbert
- Babes on Swing Street (1944) - Malcolm Curtis
- She Gets Her Man (1945) - Officer Mulligan
- Under Western Skies (1945) - Willie Wells
- What a Blonde (1945) - F. Farrington Fowler
- Mama Loves Papa (1945) - Wilbur Todd
- Riverboat Rhythm (1946) - Matt Lindsay
- Joe Palooka, Champ (1946) - Knobby Walsh
- Gentleman Joe Palooka (1946) - Knobby Walsh
- Joe Palooka in the Knockout (1947) - Knobby Walsh
- Joe Palooka in Fighting Mad (1948) - Knobby Walsh
- The Noose Hangs High (1948) - Julius Caesar 'J.C.' McBride
- Joe Palooka in the Big Fight (1949) - Knobby Walsh
- Joe Palooka in the Counterpunch (1949) - Knobby Walsh
- Joe Palooka Meets Humphrey (1950) - Knobby Walsh / Lord Cecil Poole
- Joe Palooka in Humphrey Takes a Chance (1950) - Knobby Walsh
