= Charles "Buddy" Rogers =

American actor and musician (1904–1999)

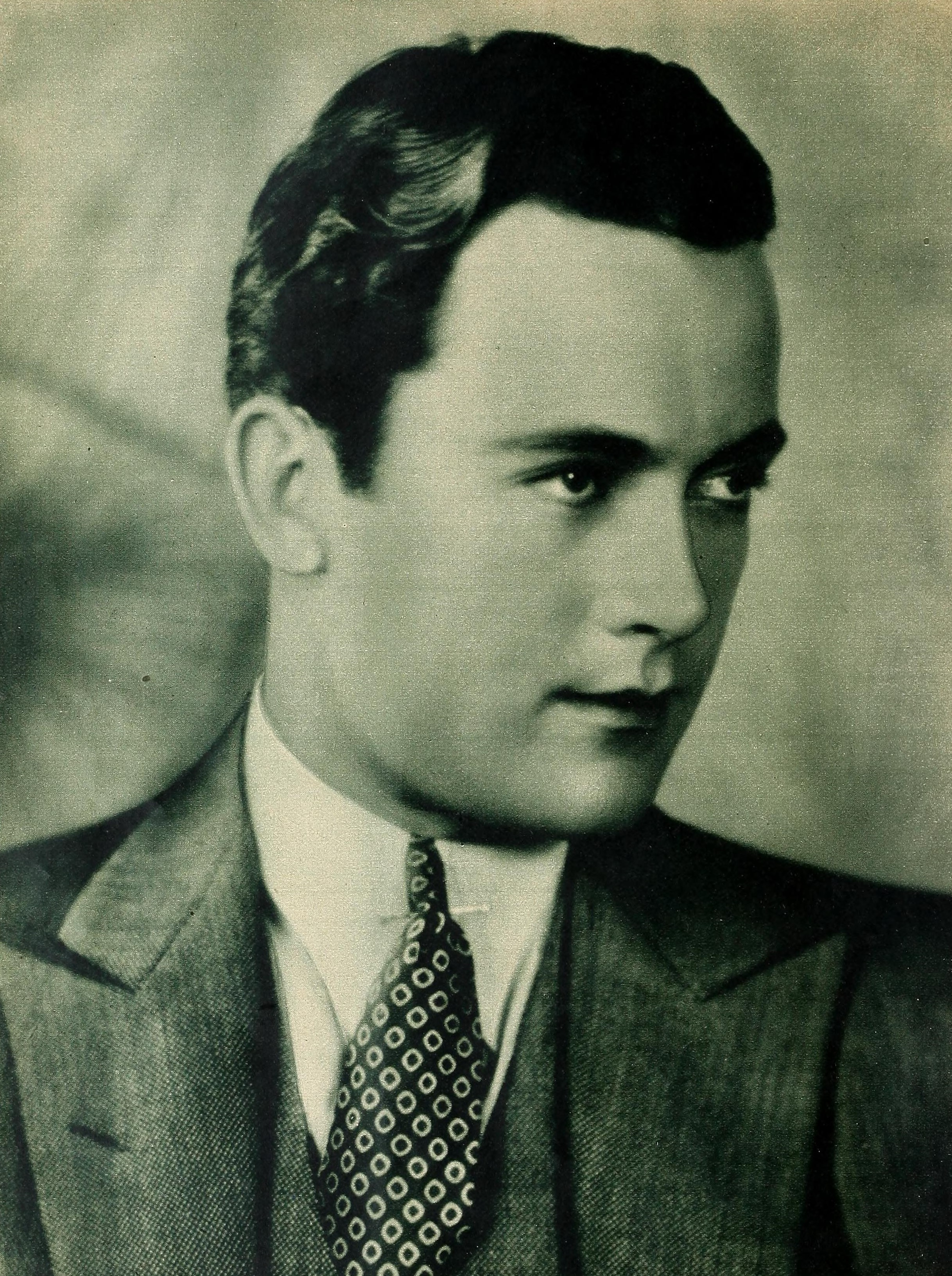
- Rogers in 1929
- Born: Charles Edward Rogers; August 13, 1904; Olathe, Kansas, U.S.
- Died: April 21, 1999 (aged 94); Rancho Mirage, California, U.S.
- Burial place: Forest Lawn Cemetery
- Education: University of Kansas
- Occupations: Actor, musician
- Years active: 1926–1968
- Spouses: Mary Pickford (m. 1937; died 1979) Beverly Ricondo (m. 1981)
- Children: 2

Charles Edward "Buddy" Rogers (August 13, 1904 – April 21, 1999) was an American film actor and musician. During the peak of his popularity in the late 1920s and early 1930s, he was publicized as "America's Boyfriend".

== Early life ==
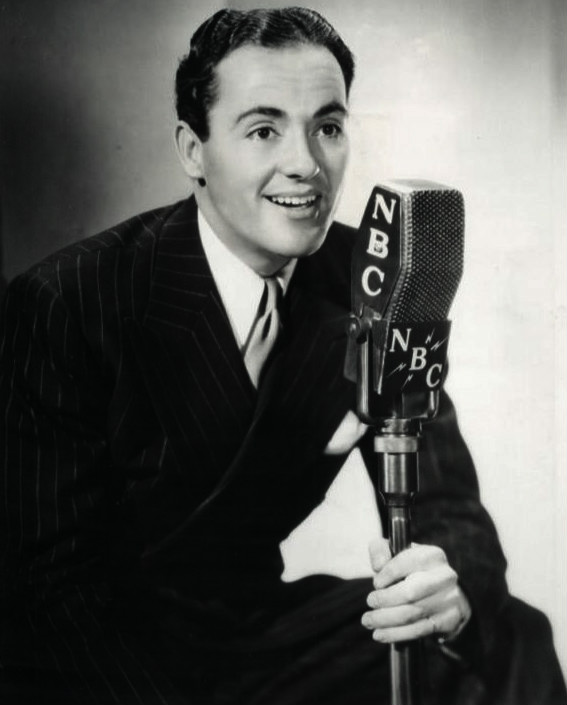
Rogers with The Twin Stars radio program, 1937

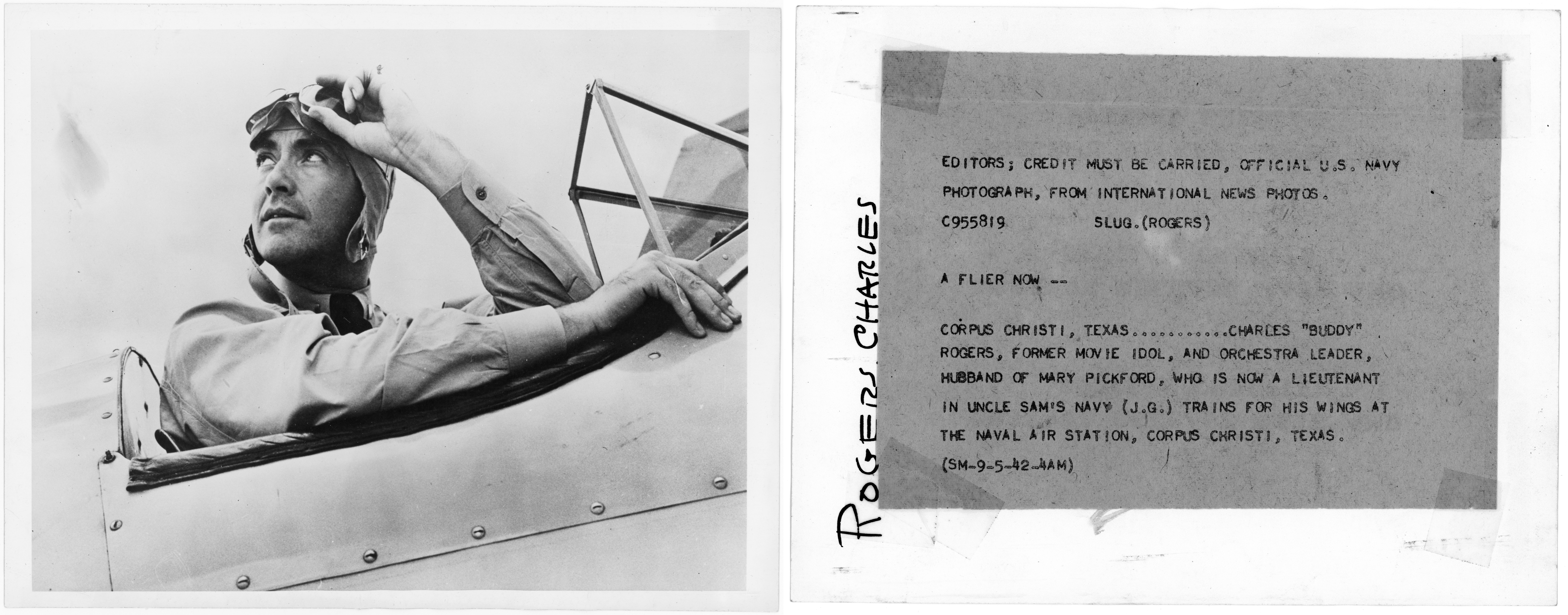
Flight training

Rogers was born to Maude and Bert Henry Rogers in Olathe, Kansas. He studied at the University of Kansas, where he became an active member of Phi Kappa Psi. In the mid-1920s, he began acting professionally in Hollywood films. A talented trombonist skilled on several other musical instruments, Rogers performed with his own dance band in motion pictures and on radio. During World War II, he served in the United States Navy as a flight training instructor.

According to American Dance Bands on Record and Film (1915–1942), compiled by Richard J. Johnson and Bernard H. Shirley (Rustbooks Publishing, 2010), Rogers was not a bandleader in the usual sense of the term. Instead, he was a film actor who fronted bands for publicity purposes. In 1933–34, Rogers took over the popular Joe Haymes orchestra, to which he added drummer Gene Krupa. His later bands were organized by Milt Shaw.

In 1930, he recorded two records for Columbia as a solo singer with a small band accompanying. In 1932, he signed with Victor and recorded four dance-band records with a group organized by drummer, and later actor, Jess Kirkpatrick. In 1938, he signed with Vocalion and recorded six swing records (see discography below).

== Career ==
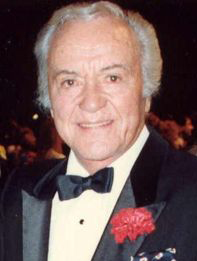
At the 1988 Academy Awards

Nicknamed "Buddy", his most-remembered performance in film was opposite Clara Bow in the 1927 Academy Award winning Wings, the first film ever honored as Best Picture. In 1968, he appeared as himself in an episode of Petticoat Junction titled "Wings", a direct reference to the silent movie.

== Recognition ==
For his contribution to the motion picture industry, Rogers has a star on the Hollywood Walk of Fame at 6135 Hollywood Blvd, which was dedicated on February 8, 1960.

Respected by his peers for his work in film and for his humanitarianism, the Academy of Motion Picture Arts and Sciences honored Rogers in 1986 with The Jean Hersholt Humanitarian Award.

A Golden Palm Star on the Palm Springs Walk of Stars was dedicated to him in 1993.

== Personal life ==
On June 24, 1937, Rogers became the third husband of silent film actress Mary Pickford. Their romance had begun in 1927, when they co-starred in My Best Girl, but the two kept their relationship hidden until Pickford's separation and 1936 divorce from Douglas Fairbanks. The couple adopted two children—Roxanne and Ronald—and remained married for 42 years until Pickford's death in 1979.

In 1981, Rogers married real estate agent Beverly Ricono.

== Death ==
Rogers died at his home in Rancho Mirage, California, on April 21, 1999, at the age of 94. He was interred at Forest Lawn Cemetery, Cathedral City, near Palm Springs.

== Partial filmography ==
- Fascinating Youth (1926) – Teddy Ward
- More Pay, Less Work (1926) – Willia Hinchfield
- So's Your Old Man (1926) – Kenneth Murchison
- Wings (1927) – Jack Powell
- My Best Girl (1927) – Joe Grant
- Get Your Man (1927) – Robert Albin
- Abie's Irish Rose (1928) – Abie Levy
- Varsity (1928) – Jimmy Duffy
- Someone to Love (1928) – William Shelby
- Red Lips (1928) – Hugh Carver / Buddy
- Close Harmony (1929) – Al West
- River of Romance (1929) – Tom Rumford
- Illusion (1929) – Carlee Thorpe
- Half Way to Heaven (1929) – Ned Lee
- Young Eagles (1930) – Lieutenant Robert Banks
- Paramount on Parade (1930) – Buddy Rogers – Episode 'Love Time'
- Safety in Numbers (1930) – William Butler Reynolds
- Follow Thru (1930) – Jerry Downes
- Heads Up (1930) – Jack Mason
- Along Came Youth (1930) – Larry Brooks
- The Slippery Pearls (1931, Short) – 'Buddy' Rogers
- The Lawyer's Secret (1931) – Laurie Roberts
- The Road to Reno (1931) – Tom Wood
- Working Girls (1931) – Boyd Wheeler
- This Reckless Age (1932) – Bradley Ingals
- Best of Enemies (1933) – Jimmie Hartman
- Take a Chance (1933) – Kenneth Raleigh
- Dance Band (1935) – Buddy Morgan
- Old Man Rhythm (1935) – Johnny Roberts
- One in a Million (1936) – Pierre
- Let's Make a Night of It (1937) – Jack Kent
- This Way Please (1937) – Brad Morgan
- Golden Hoofs (1941) – Dean MacArdle
- The Mexican Spitfire's Baby (1941) – Dennis Lindsay
- Sing for Your Supper (1941) – Larry Hays
- Mexican Spitfire at Sea (1942) – Dennis Lindsay
- Mexican Spitfire Sees a Ghost (1942) – Dennis Lindsay
- Twelfth Street Rag (1942) – Himself
- An Innocent Affair (1948) – Claude Kimball
- The Parson and the Outlaw (1957) – Rev. Jericho Jones

== Discography ==
As Charles "Buddy" Rogers (America's Boy Friend)

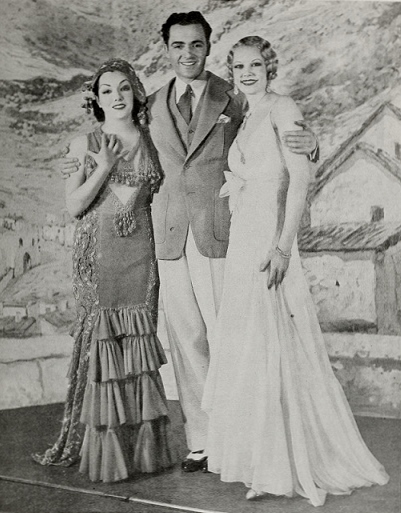
Lupe Vélez, Buddy Rogers, and June Knight in the Broadway musical Hot-Cha! (1932)

- February 27, 1930 & March 4, 1930
  - "(I'd like to be) A Bee in Your Boudoir" / "My Future Just Passed" (Columbia 2183-D)
- March 4, 1930
  - "Any Time's the Time to Fall in Love" / "(Up on Top of a Rainbow) Sweepin' the Clouds Away" (Columbia 2143-D)

As Buddy Rogers and His California Cavaliers

- April 18, 1932
  - "You Fascinate Me" / "Hello, Gorgeous" (Victor 24001)
- May 11, 1932
  - "In My Hideaway" / "Happy-Go-Lucky You (And Broken-Hearted Me)" (Victor 24015)
- May 18, 1932
  - "I Beg Your Pardon, Mademoiselle" / "With My Sweetie in the Moonlight" (Victor 24031)
  - "Please Handle with Care" / "Ask Yourself Who Loves You" (Victor 24049)

As Charles "Buddy" Rogers and his Band (recorded in London)

- February 9, 1935
  - "I Hate to Say Goodnight" / "The Valparaiso" (vocals by Rogers) (Decca F. 5681)
  - "Someone to Sew Your Buttons On" (vocal by Eve Becke) / "Jack O' Diamonds" (vocals by Rogers, Brian Lawrance, Ronnie Hill) (Decca F. 5464)

As Buddy Rogers and his Famous Swing Band

- April 5, 1938
  - "Lovelight in the Starlight" (vocal by Bob Hannon) / "This Time it's Real" (vocal by Bob Hannon) (Vocalion 4058)
  - "Moonshine Over Kentucky" (vocal by Rogers) / "Little Lady Make-Believe" (vocal by Bob Hannon) (Vocalion 4071)
- June 29, 1938
  - "Figaro" (vocal by Bob Hannon) / "Meet the Beat of My Heart" (vocal by Bob Hannon) (Vocalion 4227)
  - "Happy as a Lark" (vocal by Rogers) / "The Sunny Side of Things (vocal by Joe Mooney) (Vocalion 4240)
- September 17, 1938
  - "You Can't Be Mine (And Someone Else's Too)" (vocal by Elizabeth Tilton) / "While a Cigarette Was Burning" (vocal by Elizabeth Tilton) (Vocalion 4408)
  - "This Is Madness (to Love Like This)" (vocal by Bob Hannon) / "Rainbow 'Round the Moon" (instrumental) (Vocalion 4422)

== Sources ==
- "Charles "Buddy" Rogers biography". filmreference. 2008.
