= Mexican Spitfire at Sea =

1942 film by Leslie Goodwins

- Theatrical release poster
- Directed by: Leslie Goodwins
- Screenplay by: Charles E. Roberts; Jerry Cady
- Produced by: Cliff Reid
- Starring: Lupe Vélez; Leon Errol; Charles "Buddy" Rogers; ZaSu Pitts; Elisabeth Risdon; Florence Bates
- Cinematography: Jack MacKenzie
- Edited by: Theron Warth
- Music by: Constantin Bakaleinikoff
- Production company: RKO Radio Pictures
- Distributed by: RKO Radio Pictures
- Release date: March 13, 1942
- Running time: 72 minutes
- Country: United States
- Language: English

Mexican Spitfire at Sea is a 1942 American comedy film directed by Leslie Goodwins and written by Charles E. Roberts and Jerry Cady. It is the fifth film in the Mexican Spitfire series, which began in 1939. The film stars Lupe Vélez, Leon Errol, Charles "Buddy" Rogers, ZaSu Pitts, Elisabeth Risdon, and Florence Bates. The film was released on March 13, 1942, by RKO Radio Pictures.

== Plot ==
Carmelita Lindsay believes she's finally going away on a honeymoon trip, which she has been unable to arrange due to her husband Dennis's constant business deals. Dennis secretly intends to use this ocean voyage to sell advertising to the well-to-do Baldwins, with help from his Uncle Matt and Aunt Della.

On the cruise, a quarrel with Carmelita results in Dennis being thrown out of his cabin and into another occupied by Parisian blonde Fifi Russell. The Baldwins, assuming that Dennis and Fifi are man and wife, insist on arranging a meeting with British nobleman Lord Epping. Mistaken identities multiply thereafter, as Carmelita recruits Uncle Matt to pose as Lord Epping, and they both prevail upon passenger Emily Pepper to impersonate Lady Epping. Further complicating matters, Carmelita and Dennis's business rival make Dennis jealous.

The multiple motives and identities become so scrambled that Uncle Matt is cornered. He desperately sounds an alarm, evacuating the passengers so he can escape in the confusion.

== Cast ==
- Lupe Vélez as Carmelita Lindsay
- Leon Errol as Uncle Matt Lindsay / Lord Basil Epping
- Charles "Buddy" Rogers as Dennis Lindsay
- ZaSu Pitts as Emily Pepper
- Elisabeth Risdon as Aunt Della Lindsay
- Marion Martin as Fifi Russell
- Lydia Bilbrook as Lady Ada Epping
- Eddie Dunn as George Skinner
- Harry Holman as Joshua Baldwin
- Florence Bates as Minerva Baldwin
- Mary Field as Agnes, the Epping Maid
- Ferris Taylor as Captain Nelson
- John McGuire as First Officer Reynolds
- Marten Lamont as Purser

== Reception ==
Most critics found Mexican Spitfire at Sea up to the usual standard. Showmen's Trade Review liked it: "Fast, riotous entertainment that should please the followers of this series. Should equal the business done by its predecessors." Irene Thirer of the New York Post called it "just as rib-tickling and giggle-getting as its predecessors. Screwy situations guaranteed to keep the customers consistently laughing." Ted Strauss of the New York Times judged it a "continuously funny lampoon. As the minor half of a double bill, Mr. Errol's clowning makes an amusing interlude." Trade publisher Pete Harrison raised a critical point that the series was using the same complications in every script: "Since the same idea has been used for the basis of the stories in all the Mexican Spitfire pictures, it is beginning to wear a bit thin. As a matter of fact, this one is the silliest of the lot." Elizabeth A. Cunningham of Motion Picture Herald was more charitable but struck the same note: "For those who have yet to see Leon Errol as Lord Epping, the bibulous British baronet, and Lupe Velez as the rebellious Carmelita wedded to an advertising agency, their new adventures should provide some good laughs and general entertainment. Director Leslie Goodwins keeps the action fast and the laughs frequent. But someone -- perhaps Cliff Reid, the producer -- should realize that broad comedy doesn't stand up too well under regular repetition."
