= Lupe Vélez =

Mexican actress (1908–1944)

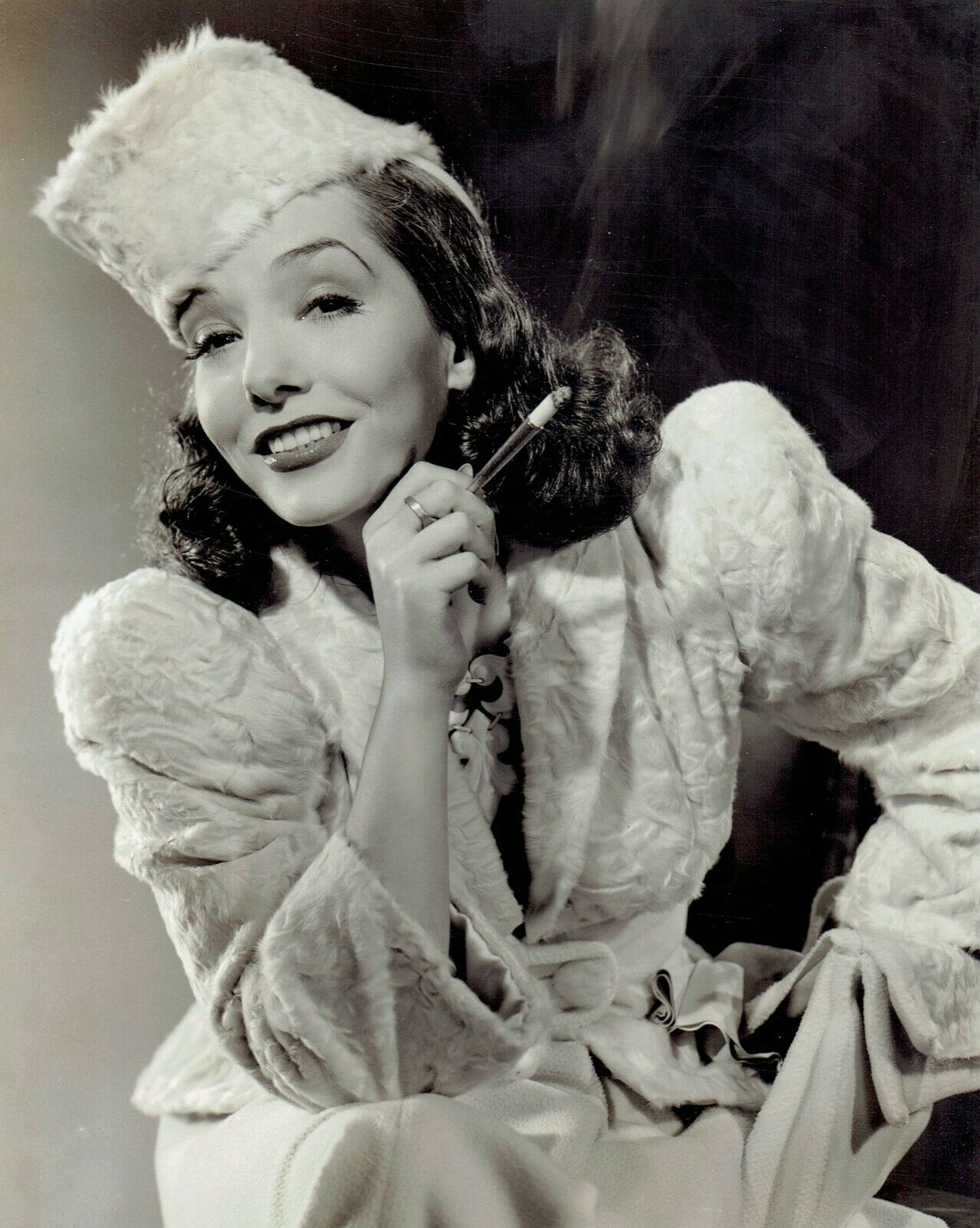
- Vélez in a publicity photo for RKO in 1941
- Born: María Guadalupe Villalobos Vélez; July 18, 1908; San Luis Potosí City, Mexico
- Died: December 14, 1944 (aged 36); Beverly Hills, California, U.S.
- Cause of death: Barbiturate overdose
- Resting place: Panteón de Dolores, Mexico City, Mexico
- Occupations: Actress; singer; dancer
- Years active: 1924–1944
- Spouse: Johnny Weissmuller (m. 1933; div. 1939)

Signature
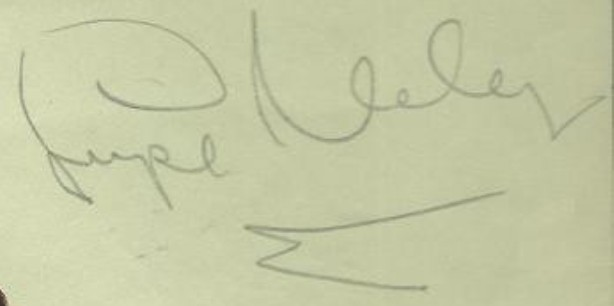

María Guadalupe "Lupe" Villalobos Vélez (July 18, 1908 – December 14, 1944) was a Mexican actress, singer, and dancer during the Golden Age of Hollywood cinema.

Vélez began her career as a performer in Mexican vaudeville in the early 1920s. After moving to the United States, she made her first film appearance in a short in 1927. By the end of the decade, she was acting in full-length silent films and had progressed to leading roles in The Gaucho (1927), Lady of the Pavements (1929) and Wolf Song (1929), among others. Vélez made the transition to sound films without difficulty. She was one of the first successful Mexican actresses in Hollywood. During the 1930s, her explosive screen persona was exploited in successful comedic films like Hot Pepper (1933), Strictly Dynamite (1934) and Hollywood Party (1934). In the 1940s, Vélez's popularity peaked while appearing as Carmelita Fuentes in eight Mexican Spitfire films, a series created to capitalize on her fiery personality.

Nicknamed The Mexican Spitfire by the media, Vélez had a personal life that was as colorful as her screen persona. She had several highly publicized romances with Hollywood actors and a stormy marriage with Johnny Weissmuller. Vélez died at age 36 in December 1944 of an intentional overdose of the barbiturate drug Seconal. Her death and the circumstances surrounding it were the subject of speculation and controversy.

== Life and career ==
=== Childhood and education ===
Vélez was born in the city of San Luis Potosí in Mexico, the daughter of Jacobo Villalobos Reyes, a colonel in the armed forces of the dictator Porfirio Diaz, and his wife Josefina Vélez, an opera singer according to some sources, or vaudeville singer according to others. She was one of five children; she had three sisters: Mercedes, Reina and Josefina and a brother, Emigdio. The Villalobos were considered a prominent, financially comfortable family in San Luis Potosí. According to Vélez's second cousin, they lived in a large home, and most of the male members received a college education.

At the age of 13, her parents sent her to study at Our Lady of the Lake (now Our Lady of the Lake University) in San Antonio, Texas, where Vélez learned to speak English and dance. She later admitted that she liked dance class, but was otherwise a poor student.

=== Beginnings in Mexico and arrival in the United States (1924–26) ===
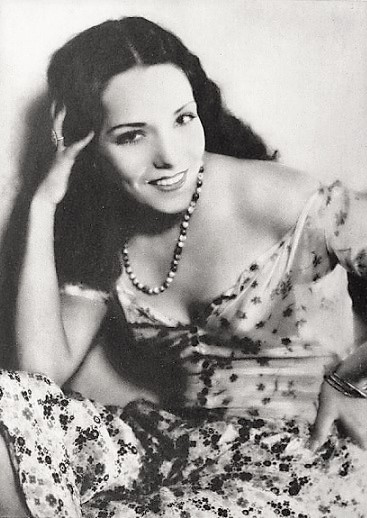
Portrait by William A. Fraker for The New Movie Magazine, 1930

Vélez began her career in Mexican revues in the early 1920s. She initially performed under her paternal surname (see Hispanic American naming customs) of Villalobos, but after her father returned home from the war (he did not die in combat as some sources state), he was outraged that his daughter had decided to become a stage performer. She chose her maternal surname Vélez as her stage name. Their mother introduced Vélez and her sister Josefina to the popular Spanish Mexican vedette María Conesa, "La Gatita Blanca". Vélez debuted in a show led by Conesa, where she sang "Oh Charley, My Boy" and danced the shimmy. In 1924, Aurelio Campos, a young pianist and friend of the Vélez sisters, recommended Vélez to stage producers Carlos Ortega and Manuel Castro. Ortega and Castro were preparing a season revue at the Regis Theatre, and hired Vélez to join the company in March 1925. Later that year, Vélez starred in the revues Mexican Rataplan and ¡No lo tapes! (both parodies of the Bataclan's shows in Paris). Her suggestive singing and provocative dancing was a hit with audiences, and she soon established herself as one of the main stars of vaudeville in Mexico. After a year and a half, Vélez left the revue after the manager refused to give her a raise. She then joined the Teatro Principal, but was fired after three months due to her "feisty attitude". Vélez was quickly hired by the Teatro Lirico, where her salary rose to 100 pesos a day.

Vélez, whose volatile and spirited personality and feuds with other performers were often covered by the Mexican press, also honed her ability for garnering publicity. Her most bitter rivals included the Mexican vedettes Celia Padilla, Celia Montalván, and Delia Magaña. Called La Niña Lupe because of her youth, Vélez soon established herself as one of the main stars of vaudeville in Mexico. Among her admirers were notable Mexican poets and writers like José Gorostiza and Renato Leduc.

In 1926, Frank A. Woodyard, an American who had seen Vélez perform, recommended her to stage director Richard Bennett (the father of actresses Joan and Constance Bennett). Bennett was looking for an actress to portray a Mexican cantina singer in his upcoming play The Dove. He sent Vélez a telegram inviting her to Los Angeles to appear in the play. Vélez had been planning to go to Cuba to perform, but quickly changed her plans and traveled to Los Angeles. However, upon arrival, she discovered that she had been replaced by another actress.

While in Los Angeles, she met the comedian Fanny Brice. Brice was taken with Vélez and later said she had never met a more fascinating personality. She promoted Vélez's career as a dancer and recommended her to Flo Ziegfeld, who hired her to perform in New York City. While Vélez was preparing to leave Los Angeles, she received a call from Metro-Goldwyn-Mayer producer Harry Rapf, who offered her a screen test. Producer and director Hal Roach saw Vélez's screen test and hired her for a small role in the comic Laurel and Hardy short Sailors, Beware! She advanced to the ingenue role opposite Charley Chase in Roach's two-reel comedy What Women Did for Me (1927).

=== Breakthrough and success (1927–38) ===
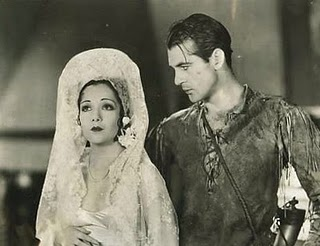
Vélez with Gary Cooper in Wolf Song (1929)

Later that year, she did a screen test for the upcoming Douglas Fairbanks full-length film The Gaucho. Fairbanks was impressed by Vélez and he quickly signed her to a contract. Upon its release in 1927, The Gaucho was a hit and critics were duly impressed with Vélez's ability to hold her own with Fairbanks, who was well known for his spirited acting and impressive stunts.

Vélez made her second major film, Stand and Deliver (1928), directed by Cecil B. DeMille. That same year, she was named one of the WAMPAS Baby Stars. In 1929, Vélez appeared in Lady of the Pavements, directed by D. W. Griffith where she sang an Irving Berlin song "Where is the Song of Songs for Me?" and recorded for Victor 21932-A and Where East Is East, playing a young Chinese woman. In the Western film Wolf Song, directed by Victor Fleming, she appears with Gary Cooper. In it she sang "Mi Amado" and recorded on Victor 21932-B. Because she was regularly cast as "exotic" or "ethnic" women that were volatile and hot-tempered, gossip columnists took to referring to Vélez as "The Mexican Hurricane", "The Mexican Wildcat", "The Mexican Madcap", "Whoopee Lupe" and "The Hot Tamale".

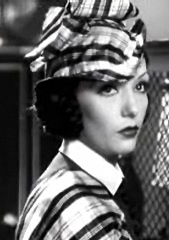
Vélez in the trailer for Laughing Boy (1934)

By 1929, the film industry was transitioning from silents to sound films. Several stars of the era saw their careers abruptly end due to heavy accents or voices that recorded poorly. Studio executives predicted that Vélez's accent would probably hamper her ability to make the transition. That idea was dispelled after she appeared in her first all-talking picture in 1929, the Rin Tin Tin vehicle Tiger Rose. The film was a hit and Vélez's sound career was established.

With the arrival of talkies, Vélez appeared in a series of Pre-Code films like Hell Harbor (directed by Henry King), The Storm (1930, directed by William Wyler), and the crime drama East Is West, with Edward G. Robinson (1930). In 1931, she appeared in her second film for Cecil B. DeMille, Squaw Man, with Warner Baxter, and in Resurrection, directed by Edwin Carewe. In 1932, Vélez filmed The Cuban Love Song (1931), with the popular singer Lawrence Tibbett. That same year, she had a supporting role in Kongo (a sound remake of West of Zanzibar), with Walter Huston. She also starred in Spanish-language versions of some of her movies produced by Universal Studios like Resurrección (1931, the Spanish version of Resurrection), and Hombres en mi vida (1932, the Spanish version of Men in Her Life). Vélez found her niche in comedy, playing beautiful, volatile characters.

In February 1932, Vélez took a break from her film career and traveled to New York City where she was signed by Broadway impresario Florenz Ziegfeld, Jr. to take over the role of "Conchita" in the musical revue Hot-Cha!. The show also starred Bert Lahr, Eleanor Powell and Buddy Rogers.

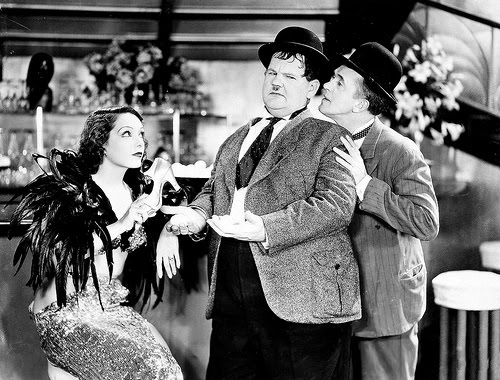
Vélez with Laurel and Hardy in Hollywood Party (1934)

In 1933, Vélez appeared in the films The Half-Naked Truth with Lee Tracy and Hot Pepper, with Victor McLaglen and Edmund Lowe. Later that year, she returned to Broadway where she starred with Jimmy Durante in the musical revue Strike Me Pink. She was reunited with Durante in three 1934 movie comedies, Palooka, Strictly Dynamite and, most famously, Hollywood Party. That same year, Vélez was cast as "Slim Girl" in Laughing Boy with Ramón Novarro. The film was quietly released and largely ignored. The few reviews it received panned the film, but praised Vélez's performance. She had more success with her brief appearance in the all-comedy-cast film Hollywood Party, where she has an egg-breaking routine with Laurel and Hardy.

Although Vélez was a popular actress, MGM Studios did not renew her contract. Over the next few years, Vélez worked for various studios as a freelance actress; she also spent two years in England, where she filmed The Morals of Marcus and Gypsy Melody (both 1936). She returned to Los Angeles the following year, where she signed with RKO for the Wheeler & Woolsey comedy High Flyers (1937, featuring some of her celebrity impersonations).

Vélez's last Broadway performance was in the 1938 musical You Never Know, by Cole Porter. The show received poor reviews from critics, but received a large amount of publicity due to the feud between Vélez and fellow cast member Libby Holman. Holman was also irritated by the attention Vélez garnered from the show with her impressions of several actresses, including Gloria Swanson, Katharine Hepburn, and Shirley Temple. The feud came to a head during a performance in New Haven, Connecticut, after Vélez punched Holman between curtain calls and gave her a black eye. The feud effectively ended the show.

Upon her return to Mexico City in 1938 to star in her first Mexican film, Vélez was greeted by ten thousand fans. The film La Zandunga directed by Fernando de Fuentes, co-starring Mexican actor Arturo de Córdova, was a critical and financial success, and Vélez was slated to appear in four more Mexican films. She instead returned to Los Angeles and went back to work for RKO.

=== Continued success and final roles (1939–44) ===
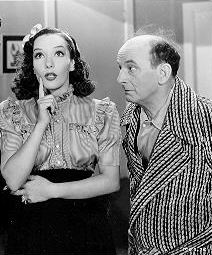
Vélez with Leon Errol in Mexican Spitfire (1940)

In 1939, Vélez was cast with Leon Errol and Donald Woods in The Girl from Mexico. Despite being a low-budget B picture, it was a hit with audiences and RKO re-teamed her with Errol and Woods for the sequel Mexican Spitfire. That film was also a success and led to a series of Spitfire films (eight in all). In the series, Vélez portrays Carmelita Lindsay, a temperamental yet friendly Mexican singer married to Dennis "Denny" Lindsay (Woods), an elegant American advertising executive. The Spitfire films rejuvenated Vélez's career. Moreover, they were films in which a Latina headlined for eight movies straight –a true rarity.

Lupe Vélez was Hollywood's number-one Latina by this time, and producer-director Mark Sandrich asked her to headline a live stage show in Ensenada, Mexico. This was in preparation for the Hollywood Victory Caravan tour, and the March 22, 1942 show featured many of the Caravan participants: Laurel and Hardy, James Cagney, Desi Arnaz, Lucille Ball, and Joan Bennett, among others. Vélez emceed the show as well, addressing the audience of 2,500 Mexican servicemen in Spanish.

In addition to the Mexican Spitfire series, she was cast in other musical and comedy features for RKO, Universal Pictures, and Columbia Pictures. Some of these films were Six Lessons from Madame La Zonga (with Leon Errol, 1941), Playmates (with John Barrymore, 1941), and Redhead from Manhattan (1943). The last film has Vélez playing the dual role of a Broadway star and her visiting twin sister, and offers the viewer a rare chance to hear Lupe Vélez's actual speaking voice. She plays the visiting sister with her customary, exaggerated Mexican accent, but plays the actress with her own, gently inflected voice, betraying only a trace of an accent.

In 1943, the final film in the Spitfire series, Mexican Spitfire's Blessed Event, was released. By that time, the mistaken-identity scripts and situations had been repeating themselves, and the novelty of the series had begun to wane, but Vélez's energy and Errol's clowning never flagged.

Vélez co-starred with Eddie Albert in a 1943 romantic comedy, Ladies' Day, about an actress and a baseball player. In 1944, Vélez returned to Mexico to star in an adaptation of Émile Zola's novel Nana, which was well received. It would be her final film. After filming wrapped, Vélez returned to Los Angeles and began preparing for another stage role in New York.

== Personal life ==
=== Public image and personality ===
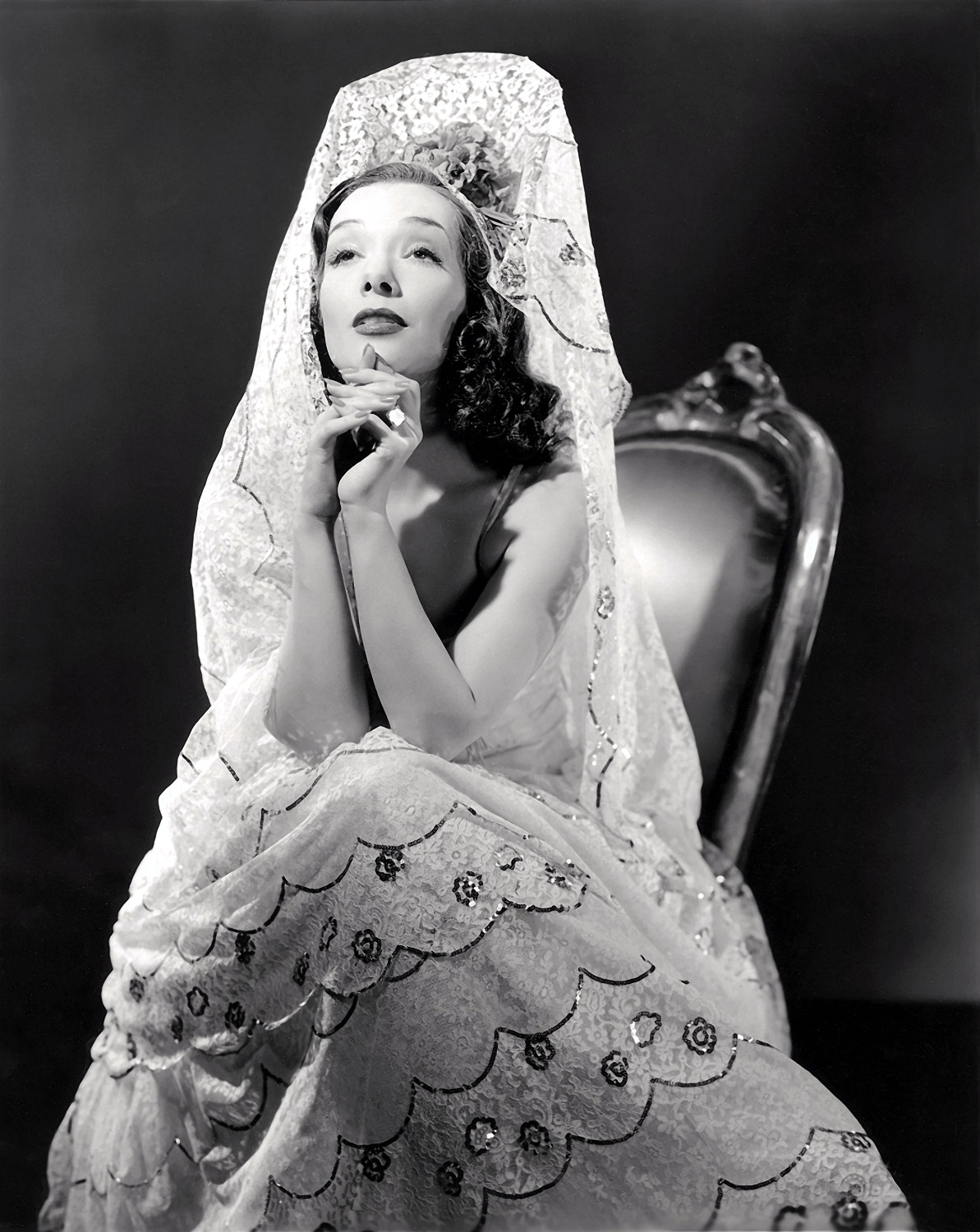
Vélez in Mexican Spitfire (1940)

Throughout her career, Vélez's onscreen persona of a hot-tempered, lusty "wild" woman was closely tied to her off-screen personality. The press often referred to her by such names as "The Mexican Spitfire", "The Mexican It girl" and "The Mexican Kitten". Publicly promoted with the "Whoopee Lupe" persona that tried to define her, she dismissed the idea that she was uncontrollably wild. In an interview, she said:

What I attribute my success?, I think, simply, because I'm different. I'm not beautiful, but I have beautiful eyes and know exactly what to do with them. Although the public thinks that I'm a very wild girl. Actually I'm not. I'm just me, Lupe Vélez, simple and natural Lupe. If I'm happy, I dance and sing and acted like a child. And if something irritates me, I cry and sob. Someone called that 'personality'. The Personality is nothing more than behave with others as you really are. If I tried to look and act like Norma Talmadge, the great dramatic actress, or like Corinne Griffith, the aristocrat of the movies, or like Mary Pickford, the sweet and gentle Mary, I would be nothing more than an imitation. I just want to be myself: Lupe Vélez.

Vélez's off-screen behavior blurred the line between her onscreen persona and her real personality. After her death, journalist Bob Thomas recalled that Vélez was a "lively part of the Hollywood scene" who wore loud clothing and made as much noise as possible. She attended boxing matches every Friday night at the Hollywood Legion Stadium and would stand on her ringside seat and scream at the fighters.

Vélez's temper and jealousy in her often tempestuous romantic relationships were well documented and became tabloid fodder, often overshadowing her career. Vélez was straightforward with the press and was regularly contacted by gossip columnists for stories about her romantic exploits. One such incident included Vélez chasing her lover Gary Cooper around with a knife during an argument and cutting him severely enough to require stitches. After their breakup, Vélez attempted to shoot Cooper while he boarded a train. During her marriage to actor Johnny Weissmuller, stories of their frequent physical fights were regularly reported in the press. Vélez reportedly inflicted scratches, bruises, and love-bites on Weissmuller during their fights and "passionate love-making".

Vélez often targeted fellow actresses whom she deemed rivals, professionally or otherwise, a habit which began back in her vaudeville days and continued in films. Vélez's image was that of a wild, highly sexualized woman who spoke her mind and was not considered a "lady", while fellow Mexican actress Dolores del Río projected herself as sensual, but elegant and restrained, often hailing from aristocratic roots. Vélez hated del Río and called her a "bird of bad omen". Del Río was terrified to meet her in public places. When this happened, Vélez was scathing and aggressive. Vélez openly mimicked del Río, ironically making fun of her elegance. Vélez also disliked Marlene Dietrich, whom she suspected of having an affair with Gary Cooper while filming Morocco in 1930. Her rivalries with Jetta Goudal, Lilyan Tashman and Libby Holman were well documented. In retaliation, Vélez would perform wicked impersonations of the women she disliked at Hollywood parties. She made these imitations part of her comic repertoire, exaggerating the facial and vocal mannerisms of Marlene Dietrich, Fanny Brice, Gloria Swanson, Katharine Hepburn, Simone Simon, and Shirley Temple.

=== Relationships and marriage ===
Lupe Vélez was involved in several highly publicized and often stormy relationships. Upon arriving in Los Angeles, she was linked to actors Tom Mix, Charlie Chaplin, and Clark Gable. Her first long-term, high-profile relationship was with Gary Cooper. Vélez and Cooper met while filming 1929's Wolf Song and began a two-year relationship that was passionate and often stormy. When angered, Vélez was reported to have physically assaulted Cooper. Cooper eventually ended the relationship in mid-1931, at the behest of his mother Alice, who, after meeting her, strongly disapproved of Vélez. With plans to marry him gone, she spoke to the press in 1931: "I turned Cooper down because his parents didn't want me to marry him and because the studio thought it would injure his career. Now it's over, I'm glad I feel so free ... I must be free. I know men too well they are all the same, no? If you love them they want to be boss. I will never have a boss." The rocky relationship had taken its toll on Cooper, who had lost 45 pounds and was suffering from nervous exhaustion. Paramount Pictures ordered him to take a vacation to recuperate and while he was boarding the train, Vélez showed up at the station and fired a pistol at him.

After her breakup with Cooper, Vélez began a short-lived relationship with actor John Gilbert. They began dating in late 1931 while Gilbert was separated from his third wife Ina Claire. Rumors of an engagement were fueled by the couple, but Gilbert ended the relationship in early 1932, and attempted to reconcile with Claire.

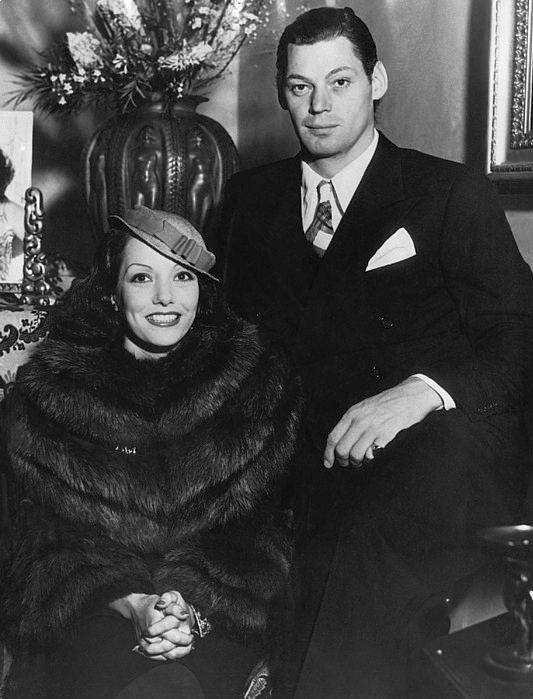
Vélez and Johnny Weissmuller photographed shortly after their wedding in October 1933

Shortly thereafter, Vélez met Tarzan actor Johnny Weissmuller while the two were in New York. They dated on and off when they returned to Los Angeles, while Vélez also dated actor Errol Flynn. On October 8, 1933, Vélez and Weissmuller were married in Las Vegas. There were reports of domestic violence and public fights. In July 1934, after ten months of marriage, Vélez filed for divorce citing "cruelty". She withdrew the petition a week later after reconciling with Weissmuller. On January 3, 1935, she filed for divorce a second time and was granted an interlocutory decree. That decree was dismissed when the couple reconciled a month later. In August 1938, Vélez filed for divorce for a third time, again charging Weissmuller with cruelty. Their divorce was finalized in August 1939.

After the divorce became final, Vélez began dating actor/polo player Guinn "Big Boy" Williams in late 1940. They got engaged, but never married. In late 1941, she became involved with author Erich Maria Remarque. Actress Luise Rainer recalled that Remarque told her "with the greatest of glee" that he found Vélez's volatility wonderful when he recounted to her an occasion where Vélez became so angry with him that she took her shoe off and hit him with it. After dating Remarque, Vélez was linked to boxers Jack Johnson and Jack Dempsey.

In 1943, Vélez began an affair with her La Zandunga co-star Arturo de Córdova. De Córdova had recently moved to Los Angeles after signing with Paramount. Despite the fact that De Córdova was married to Mexican actress Enna Arana with whom he had four children, Vélez granted an interview to gossip columnist Louella Parsons in September 1943 and announced that the two were engaged. She told Parsons that she planned to retire after marrying de Córdova to "cook ... and keep house". Vélez ended the engagement in early 1944, after de Córdova's wife refused to give him a divorce.

Vélez then met and began dating a struggling young Austrian actor named Harald Maresch, whose stage name was Harald Ramond. In September 1944, she discovered she was pregnant with Ramond's child. She announced their engagement in late November 1944. On December 10, four days before her death, Vélez announced she had ended the engagement and kicked Ramond out of her home.

== Death ==
On the evening of December 13, 1944, Vélez dined with two friends, the silent-film star Estelle Taylor and Venita Oakie. In the early morning hours of December 14, Vélez retired to her bedroom, where she consumed 75 Seconal pills and a glass of brandy. Her secretary, Beulah Kinder, said that she found the actress' body on her bed later that morning. A suicide note addressed to Harald Ramond was found nearby. It read:

To Harald, May God forgive you and forgive me too, but I prefer to take my life away and our baby's before I bring him with shame or killing him. – Lupe.

On the back of the note, Vélez wrote:

How could you, Harald, fake such a great love for me and our baby when all the time, you didn't want us? I see no other way out for me, so goodbye, and good luck to you, Love Lupe.

The day after Vélez's death, Harald Ramond told the press that he was "so confused" by Vélez's suicide, and claimed that even though the two had broken up, he had agreed to marry Vélez. He admitted that he once asked Vélez to sign an agreement stating that he was only marrying her to "give the baby a name", but claimed he only did so because he and Vélez had had a fight, and he was in a "terrible temper". Actress Estelle Taylor, who was with Vélez from 9:00 the previous night until 3:30 the morning Vélez died, told the press that Vélez had told her of her pregnancy, but said she would rather kill herself than have an abortion. Beulah Kinder, Vélez's secretary, later told investigators that after Vélez broke off the relationship with Ramond, she planned to go to Mexico to have her baby. Kinder said Vélez soon changed her mind after concluding that Ramond "faked" the relationship and considered having an abortion.

The day after Vélez's death, the Los Angeles County coroner requested that an inquest be opened to investigate the circumstances surrounding her death. On December 16, the coroner dropped the request, after determining that Vélez had written the notes, and that she had intended to kill herself. On December 22, a funeral for Vélez was held at the mortuary at Forest Lawn Memorial Park in Los Angeles. Among the pallbearers were Vélez's ex-husband, Johnny Weissmuller, and actor Gilbert Roland. After the service, Vélez's body was sent by train to Mexico City, where a second service was held on December 27. Her body was then interred at Panteón Civil de Dolores Cemetery.

=== Alternative theories and urban legend ===
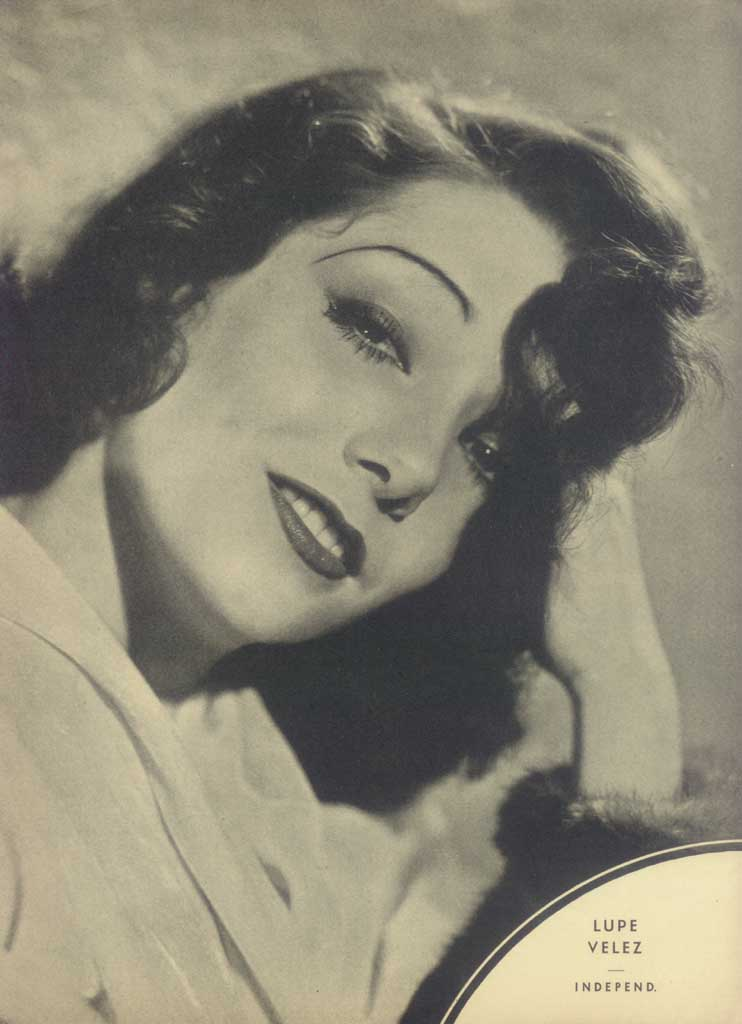
Publicity image for an Argentinean magazine, 1933

Despite the coroner's ruling that Vélez committed suicide to avoid the shame of bearing an illegitimate child, some authors have speculated that this was not entirely true.

In the book From Bananas to Buttocks: The Latina Body in Popular Film and Culture, Rosa-Linda Fregoso wrote that Vélez was known for her defiance of contemporary moral convention, and that it seems unlikely that she could not have reconciled having a child out of wedlock. Fregoso believes that in the final year of her life, Vélez exhibited signs of extreme mania and depression. Fregoso goes on to speculate that Vélez's death may have been the result of an untreated mental illness such as bipolar disorder.

Robert Slatzer (who later claimed to have been secretly married to Marilyn Monroe) claimed that a few weeks before Vélez's death, he interviewed her at her home, and she confided in him that she was pregnant with Gary Cooper's child (by that time, Cooper was married to socialite Veronica "Rocky" Balfe). According to Slatzer, Vélez said that Cooper refused to acknowledge the child, believing that Harald Ramond was the father. After Vélez died, Slatzer said he asked Cooper about the situation, and Cooper confirmed that it was possible he might have been the father. Slatzer further claimed that he also interviewed Clara Bow (who had also dated Cooper in the 1920s), who revealed that shortly before Vélez's death, Cooper called her and screamed that he was going to kill Harald Ramond for impregnating Vélez. Slatzer claimed that Bow told him that she never believed Vélez's baby was fathered by Ramond, and that she was convinced that Vélez had attempted to get Ramond to marry her to protect Cooper's reputation. Biographer Michelle Vogel speculated that if Cooper was the father, his rejection of Vélez and their child, coupled with the idea of having to raise a child alone, may have sent Vélez "over the edge".

In the 2002 book Tarzan, My Father, Johnny Weissmuller, Jr., recounted the events surrounding Vélez's death as a mystery caused by an attempt to "put a lid" on what happened. It states her housekeeper discovered her body and called Bo Roos, Vélez's business manager, who called his friend and Beverly Hills Police Chief Anderson to the scene. The book states after Vélez arranged to meet Ramond, decorated her room, and dressed in a negligee, her ingestion of the barbiturate Seconal was either to calm her nerves before meeting him, or a failed dramatic gesture to scare him. The book also suggested the baby was fathered possibly by Cooper, not Ramond.

The recounting of Vélez's death by Kenneth Anger in his book Hollywood Babylon has become urban legend. In Anger's telling, Vélez planned to stage an elaborate suicide scene atop her satin bed, but the Seconal did not mix well with the "Mexi-Spice Last Supper" she had eaten earlier that evening. As a result, she became violently ill, stumbled to the bathroom to vomit, slipped on the bathroom floor tile, and fell headfirst into the toilet, where she subsequently drowned. Anger claimed that Vélez's "chambermaid" Juanita found her the next morning. Despite the fact that his version of events contradicts published reports and the official ruling, his story is often repeated as fact or for comedic effect – it was recounted as “Hollywood Tragedy: The Suicide of Lupe Velez” [sic] from Sleazy Scandals of the Silver Screen (Cartoonist Co-Op Press, 1974), illustrated by Jim Osborne, and in the pilot episode of the television comedy series Frasier, "The Good Son"; referred to in an episode of the cartoon The Simpsons; and mentioned in the song "I Wanna O.D." by the Demolition Doll Rods. Vélez's biographer, Michelle Vogel, points out that it would have been "virtually impossible" for Vélez to have "stumbled to the bathroom" or even get off her bed after having consumed such a large amount of Seconal. This barbiturate is noted for being fast-acting even in small doses, and Vélez's death was probably instantaneous. Her death certificate lists "Seconal poisoning" due to "ingestion of Seconal" as the cause of death, not drowning. Further, there was also no evidence to suggest Vélez had vomited. In 2013, the first publication of a police photo of Vèlez's body on the floor of her bedroom was published.

== Legacy ==
For her contribution to the motion picture industry, Vélez has a star on the Hollywood Walk of Fame, at 6927 Hollywood Boulevard.

In 2017, artist Emilio Borjas' sculpture in honor of Vélez was placed in the Garden of San Sebastian, the neighborhood where the actress was born in San Luis Potosí, Mexico.

Lupe Velez Hollywood Walk of Fame Star

== Radio appearances ==
Year	Program	Episode	Notes
1932	The Ziegfeld Follies of the Air	n/a	
1935	Lux Radio Theatre	"The Broken Wing"	with Florence Malone
1937	Texaco Town (aka The Eddie Cantor Show)	"At The Coconut Grove"	with Ben Bernie, Deanna Durbin & Bobby Breen
1937	Lux Radio Theatre	"Under Two Flags"	with Herbert Marshall & Olivia de Havilland

== In popular culture ==
=== Films and television ===
- In 1949, the Los Angeles Daily News reported that the Puerto Rican dancer Marquita Rivera was chosen to star in a biographical film based on the life of the actress. However, due to the controversy over Vélez's suicide at that time, the film was never produced. The Cuban rumbera Amalia Aguilar was also in talks to star in a film about Vélez, but later decided not to work in Hollywood, and returned to Mexico. In 1965 Latina actress Estelita Rodriguez, who had once played Spitfire-like ingenues for Republic Pictures, announced that she would star in a screen biography of Vélez, but the project died with Rodriguez in March 1966.
- Andy Warhol's underground film, Lupe (1965), starring Edie Sedgwick as Vélez, is loosely based on the night of her suicide. The film features Sedgwick (in her last film role for Warhol) preparing a "beautiful suicide" only to end up drowning in the toilet bowl.
- In August 2009, the short film Forever Lupe premiered at the Seattle Latino Film Festival. Directed by Martín Caballero, the film is based on the life of Vélez and features Mexican actress Marieli Romo as Vélez.
- In 2012, it was reported that Mexican director Carlos Carrera was preparing to film the life of Lupe Vélez in a Mexican-American production. Mexican actress Ana de la Reguera was chosen to play Vélez.
- Vélez is played by the Cuban-Venezuelan actress María Conchita Alonso in the 2014 film Return to Babylon.
- In the pilot episode of the sitcom Frasier, "The Good Son", Frasier Crane's producer, Roz Doyle, tries to improve Frasier's outlook on his life by telling him the story of Lupe Vélez, who she says "decided to take one final stab at immortality". Roz re-tells the urban legend version of Vélez's suicide, reminding Frasier that "even though things might not happen like we planned, they can work out anyway". When Frasier asks "how it worked out for Lupe", Roz tells him that "all she wanted was to be remembered. Will you ever forget that story?" Later in the episode, Frasier asks a caller to his radio show: "Have you ever heard of the story of Lupe Vélez?"
- In the 1997 The Simpsons episode "Homer's Phobia", guest star John Waters takes the Simpson family, sans Homer, on a driving tour of Springfield's shopping district. During the tour, he points out a store where he claims Vélez bought the toilet she drowned in.

=== Other media ===
- Lupe Vélez was featured on the initial issue (no. 1) of the Italian puzzle weekly La Settimana Enigmistica, issued on January 23, 1932. This initiated the tradition, still continued presently by the publisher of the magazine, of featuring the picture of a star on the front page puzzle: a woman and a man on alternate weeks.
