= Roy Webb filmography =

Roy Webb (3 October 1888 – 10 December 1982) was an American film music composer. Webb has hundreds of film music credits to his name, mainly with RKO Pictures.

Webb orchestrated and conducted for the Broadway stage, before moving to Hollywood in the late 1920s to work as music director for Radio Pictures, later RKO Pictures. He remained at RKO until 1955, then worked freelance for several years, including scoring several episodes of Wagon Train. Webb is credited as composer or arranger on more than 200 films, and received Academy Award nominations for Quality Street (1937), My Favorite Wife (1940), I Married a Witch (1942), Joan of Paris (1942), The Fallen Sparrow (1943), The Fighting Seabees (1944), and The Enchanted Cottage (1945).

== Filmography ==
(as per AFI's database)

Year	Title	Role	Production Co.
1920	The Devil's Garden	Art director	Whitman Bennett Productions
1920	The Truth About Husbands	Art director	Whitman Bennett Productions
1920	The Fear Market	Assistant director	Realart Pictures
1920	The Stolen Kiss	Assistant director	Realart Pictures
1921	Salvation Nell	Art director	Whitman Bennett Productions
1933	Professional Sweetheart	Music director	RKO Radio Pictures
1934	Kentucky Kernels	Music director	RKO Radio Pictures
1934	Hips, Hips, Hooray!	Music director	RKO Radio Pictures
1934	Lightning Strikes Twice	Music director	RKO Radio Pictures
1934	Cockeyed Cavaliers	Music director	RKO Radio Pictures
1934	West of the Pecos	Music director	RKO Radio Pictures
1935	Becky Sharp	Music director	RKO Radio Pictures
1935	Old Man Rhythm	Music director	RKO Radio Pictures
1935	The Last Days of Pompeii	Music director	RKO Radio Pictures
1935	Another Face	Music director	RKO Radio Pictures
1935	The Arizonian	Music director	RKO Radio Pictures
1935	Captain Hurricane	Music director	RKO Radio Pictures
1935	We're Only Human	Music director	RKO Radio Pictures
1935	Alice Adams	Music director	RKO Radio Pictures
1935	The Nitwits	Music director	RKO Radio Pictures
1935	The Rainmakers	Music director	RKO Radio Pictures
1935	Enchanted April	Music director	RKO Radio Pictures
1935	In Person	Music director	RKO Radio Pictures
1935	Laddie	Music director	RKO Radio Pictures
1935	Strangers All	Music director	RKO Radio Pictures
1935	Sylvia Scarlett	Music director	RKO Radio Pictures
1936	The Last of the Mohicans	Music director	RKO Radio Pictures
1936	Silly Billies	Music director	RKO Radio Pictures
1936	Muss 'Em Up	Music director	RKO Radio Pictures
1936	A Woman Rebels	Music director	RKO Radio Pictures
1936	The Ex-Mrs. Bradford	Music director	RKO Radio Pictures
1936	The Bride Walks Out	Music director	RKO Radio Pictures
1936	The Witness Chair	Music director	RKO Radio Pictures
1936	The Lady Consents	Music director	RKO Radio Pictures
1936	Mummy's Boys	Music director	RKO Radio Pictures
1936	Murder on a Bridle Path	Music director	RKO Radio Pictures
1936	Bunker Bean	Music director	RKO Radio Pictures
1936	Special Investigator	Music director	RKO Radio Pictures
1937	Forty Naughty Girls	Music director	RKO Radio Pictures
1937	The Plough and the Stars	Musical score	RKO Radio Pictures
1937	Quality Street	Musical score	RKO Radio Pictures
1937	Sea Devils	Music director	RKO Radio Pictures
1937	New Faces of 1937	Music director	RKO Radio Pictures
1937	On Again-Off Again	Music director	RKO Radio Pictures
1937	Racing Lady	Music director	RKO Radio Pictures
1937	The Outcasts of Poker Flat	Music supervisor	RKO Radio Pictures
1937	The Life of the Party	Music director	RKO Radio Pictures
1937	High Flyers	Music director	RKO Radio Pictures
1937	Meet the Missus	Music director	RKO Radio Pictures
1937	Stage Door	Music director	RKO Radio Pictures
1937	The Woman I Love	Music director	RKO Radio Pictures
1938	The Renegade Ranger	Music director	RKO Radio Pictures
1938	Night Spot	Music director	RKO Radio Pictures
1938	The Mad Miss Manton	Musical score	RKO Radio Pictures
1938	Having Wonderful Time	Music director	RKO Radio Pictures
1938	Vivacious Lady	Music director	RKO Radio Pictures
1938	Go Chase Yourself	Music director	RKO Radio Pictures
1938	Border G-Man	Music director	RKO Radio Pictures
1938	Crime Ring	Music director	RKO Radio Pictures
1938	Gun Law	Music director	RKO Radio Pictures
1938	I'm From the City	Music director	RKO Radio Pictures
1938	The Affairs of Annabel	Music director	RKO Radio Pictures
1938	Mr. Doodle Kicks Off	Music director	RKO Radio Pictures
1938	Condemned Women	Music director	RKO Radio Pictures
1938	The Law West of Tombstone	Music director	RKO Radio Pictures
1938	Painted Desert	Music director	RKO Radio Pictures
1938	Sky Giant	Music director	RKO Radio Pictures
1938	Blond Cheat	Music director	RKO Radio Pictures
1938	Next Time I Marry	Music director	RKO Radio Pictures
1938	Lawless Valley	Music director	RKO Radio Pictures
1938	Bringing Up Baby	Music director	RKO Radio Pictures
1938	Room Service	Music director	RKO Radio Pictures
1938	A Man to Remember	Musical score	RKO Radio Pictures
1939	The Fighting Gringo	Music director	RKO Radio Pictures
1939	The Girl from Mexico	Music director	RKO Radio Pictures
1939	Bad Lands	Musical score	RKO Radio Pictures
1939	The Great Man Votes	Musical score	RKO Radio Pictures
1939	The Rookie Cop	Music director	RKO Radio Pictures
1939	Conspiracy	Musical score	RKO Radio Pictures
1939	They Made Her a Spy	Music director	RKO Radio Pictures
1939	Twelve Crowded Hours	Music director	RKO Radio Pictures
1939	5th Avenue Girl	Music director	RKO Radio Pictures
1939	Full Confession	Musical score	RKO Radio Pictures
1939	Panama Lady	Music director	RKO Radio Pictures
1939	Beauty for the Asking	Music director	RKO Radio Pictures
1939	Five Came Back	Musical score	RKO Radio Pictures
1939	In Name Only	Musical score	RKO Radio Pictures
1939	Bachelor Mother	Musical score	RKO Radio Pictures
1939	Love Affair	Musical score	RKO Radio Pictures
1939	Sorority House	Musical score	RKO Radio Pictures
1939	Arizona Legion	Music director	RKO Radio Pictures
1939	Fixer Dugan	Music director	RKO Radio Pictures
1939	The Flying Irishman	Musical score	RKO Radio Pictures
1939	Racketeers of the Range	Music director	RKO Radio Pictures
1939	Reno	Music director	RKO Radio Pictures
1939	Three Sons	Musical score	RKO Radio Pictures
1939	Sued for Libel	Music director	RKO Radio Pictures
1939	Two Thoroughbreds	Musical score	RKO Radio Pictures
1939	The Saint Strikes Back	Music director	RKO Radio Pictures
1939	The Girl and the Gambler	Music director	RKO Radio Pictures
1939	Timber Stampede	Music director	RKO Radio Pictures
1939	Trouble in Sundown	Music director	RKO Radio Pictures
1940	Mexican Spitfire Out West	Musical score	RKO Radio Pictures
1940	Anne of Windy Poplars	Music director	RKO Radio Pictures
1940	Stranger on the Third Floor	Music director	RKO Radio Pictures
1940	The Marines Fly High	Music director	RKO Radio Pictures
1940	Curtain Call	Musical score	RKO Radio Pictures
1940	You Can't Fool Your Wife	Musical score	RKO Radio Pictures
1940	Kitty Foyle	Musical score	RKO Radio Pictures
1940	My Favorite Wife	Musical score	RKO Radio Pictures
1940	Abe Lincoln in Illinois	Musical score	RKO Radio Pictures
1940	Millionaires in Prison	Music director	RKO Radio Pictures
1940	Cross-Country Romance	Music director	RKO Radio Pictures
1940	Laddie	Musical score	RKO Radio Pictures
1940	I'm Still Alive	Music director	RKO Radio Pictures
1940	You'll Find Out	Music director	RKO Radio Pictures
1940	The Saint Takes Over	Music director	RKO Radio Pictures
1940	The Saint's Double Trouble	Music director	RKO Radio Pictures
1940	A Bill of Divorcement	Musical score	RKO Radio Pictures
1940	Little Men	Music director	RKO Radio Pictures
1941	The Devil and Miss Jones	Music director	RKO Radio Pictures
1941	Father Takes a Wife	Music director	RKO Radio Pictures
1941	A Girl, a Guy and a Gob	Musical score	RKO Radio Pictures
1941	Look Who's Laughing	Music	RKO Radio Pictures
1941	Parachute Battalion	Musical score	RKO Radio Pictures
1941	Playmates	Music director	RKO Radio Pictures
1941	The Saint in Palm Springs	Musical score	RKO Radio Pictures
1941	Week-End for Three	Musical score	RKO Radio Pictures
1941	Tom, Dick and Harry	Musical score	RKO Radio Pictures
1941	Let's Make Music	Music director	RKO Radio Pictures
1942	Army Surgeon	Musical score	RKO Radio Pictures
1942	The Big Street	Musical score	RKO Radio Pictures
1942	Cat People	Musical score	RKO Radio Pictures
1942	The Falcon's Brother	Musical score	RKO Radio Pictures
1942	Here We Go Again	Musical score	RKO Radio Pictures
1942	Highways by Night	Musical score	RKO Radio Pictures
1942	I Married a Witch	Musical score	Paramount Pictures
1942	Joan of Paris	Musical score	RKO Radio Pictures
1942	The Magnificent Ambersons	Additional music	RKO Radio Pictures
1942	My Favorite Spy	Musical score	RKO Radio Pictures
1942	The Navy Comes Through	Musical score	RKO Radio Pictures
1942	Obliging Young Lady	Musical score	RKO Radio Pictures
1942	Powder Town	Music director	RKO Radio Pictures
1942	The Tuttles of Tahiti	Musical score	RKO Radio Pictures
1942	Seven Miles from Alcatraz	Musical score	RKO Radio Pictures
1943	The Falcon in Danger	Musical score	RKO Radio Pictures
1943	The Falcon Strikes Back	Musical score	RKO Radio Pictures
1943	The Fallen Sparrow	Musical score	RKO Radio Pictures
1943	Flight for Freedom	Musical score	RKO Radio Pictures
1943	Gangway for Tomorrow	Musical score	RKO Radio Pictures
1943	The Ghost Ship	Musical score	RKO Radio Pictures
1943	Hitler's Children	Musical score	RKO Radio Pictures
1943	I Walked With a Zombie	Musical score	RKO Radio Pictures
1943	The Iron Major	Musical score	RKO Radio Pictures
1943	Ladies' Day	Musical score	RKO Radio Pictures
1943	A Lady Takes a Chance	Musical score	RKO Radio Pictures
1943	The Leopard Man	Musical score	RKO Radio Pictures
1943	Mr. Lucky	Musical score	RKO Radio Pictures
1943	Petticoat Larceny	Musical score	RKO Radio Pictures
1943	The Seventh Victim	Musical score	RKO Radio Pictures
1943	Bombardier	Musical score	RKO Radio Pictures
1943	Behind the Rising Sun	Musical score	RKO Radio Pictures
1943	Journey Into Fear	Musical score	RKO Radio Pictures
1943	The Nazis Strike	Original music compositions	U.S. War Department
1944	The Falcon Out West	Musical score	RKO Radio Pictures
1944	Experiment Perilous	Musical score	RKO Radio Pictures
1944	The Curse of the Cat People	Musical score	RKO Radio Pictures
1944	Marine Raiders	Musical score	RKO Radio Pictures
1944	The Master Race	Musical score	RKO Radio Pictures
1944	Murder, My Sweet	Musical score	RKO Radio Pictures
1944	Passport to Destiny	Musical score	RKO Radio Pictures
1944	Rainbow Island	Musical score	Paramount Pictures
1944	The Seventh Cross	Musical score	Metro-Goldwyn-Mayer
1944	Tall in the Saddle	Musical score	RKO Radio Pictures
1944	Action in Arabia	Musical score	RKO Radio Pictures
1944	Bride by Mistake	Musical score	RKO Radio Pictures
1945	Back to Bataan	Musical score	RKO Radio Pictures
1945	Betrayal from the East	Musical score	RKO Radio Pictures
1945	The Body Snatcher	Musical score	RKO Radio Pictures
1945	Cornered	Musical score	RKO Radio Pictures
1945	Dick Tracy	Musical score	RKO Radio Pictures
1945	The Enchanted Cottage	Musical score	RKO Radio Pictures
1945	Love, Honor and Goodbye	Musical score	Republic Pictures
1945	Those Endearing Young Charms	Musical score	RKO Radio Pictures
1945	Two O'Clock Courage	Music director	RKO Radio Pictures
1945	Zombies on Broadway	Musical score	RKO Radio Pictures
1946	Badman's Territory	Musical score	RKO Radio Pictures
1946	Bedlam	Musical score	RKO Radio Pictures
1946	The Locket	Musical score	RKO Radio Pictures
1946	Notorious	Musical score	RKO Radio Pictures
1946	The Spiral Staircase	Musical score	RKO Radio Pictures
1946	The Well Groomed Bride	Musical score	Paramount Pictures
1946	Without Reservations	Musical score	RKO Radio Pictures
1946	Hollywood Bound	Music director	RKO Radio Pictures
1947	Crossfire	Musical score	RKO Radio Pictures
1947	Easy Come, Easy Go	Musical score	Paramount Pictures
1947	Magic Town	Musical score	RKO Radio Pictures
1947	Out of the Past	Musical score	RKO Radio Pictures
1947	Riffraff	Musical score	RKO Radio Pictures
1947	Sinbad the Sailor	Musical score	RKO Radio Pictures
1947	They Won't Believe Me	Musical score	RKO Radio Pictures
1948	Blood on the Moon	Musical score	RKO Radio Pictures
1948	Cass Timberlane	Musical score	Metro-Goldwyn-Mayer
1948	Fighting Father Dunne	Musical score	RKO Radio Pictures
1948	I Remember Mama	Musical score	RKO Radio Pictures
1948	Race Street	Musical score	RKO Radio Pictures
1948	Rachel and the Stranger	Musical score	RKO Radio Pictures
1949	Bad Men of Tombstone	Musical score	Allied Artists
1949	Easy Living	Musical score	RKO Radio Pictures
1949	Holiday Affair	Musical score	RKO Radio Pictures
1949	Mighty Joe Young	Musical score	RKO Radio Pictures
1949	My Friend Irma	Musical score	Wallis-Hazen, Inc.
1949	Roughshod	Musical score	RKO Radio Pictures
1949	The Window	Musical score	RKO Radio Pictures
1950	The Secret Fury	Musical score	RKO Radio Pictures
1950	Vendetta	Musical score	RKO Radio Pictures
1950	Where Danger Lives	Musical score	RKO Radio Pictures
1950	The White Tower	Musical score	RKO Radio Pictures
1950	Branded	Musical score	Paramount Pictures
1950	Gambling House	Musical score	RKO Radio Pictures
1951	Fixed Bayonets!	Musical score	Twentieth Century-Fox
1951	Flying Leathernecks	Musical score	RKO Radio Pictures
1951	Hard, Fast and Beautiful	Musical score	RKO Radio Pictures
1951	Sealed Cargo	Musical score	RKO Radio Pictures
1952	At Sword's Point	Musical score	RKO Radio Pictures
1952	Clash by Night	Musical score	RKO Radio Pictures / Wald/Krasna Productions
1952	A Girl in Every Port	Musical score	RKO Radio Pictures
1952	The Lusty Men	Musical score	RKO Radio Pictures / Wald/Krasna Productions
1952	Operation Secret	Musical score	Warner Bros.
1953	Affair with a Stranger	Musical score	RKO Radio Pictures
1953	Houdini	Musical score	Paramount Pictures
1953	Second Chance	Musical score	RKO Radio Pictures
1953	Split Second	Musical score	RKO Radio Pictures
1954	The Raid	Music	Panoramic Productions / Twentieth Century-Fox
1954	She Couldn't Say No	Musical score	RKO Radio Pictures
1954	Track of the Cat	Musical score	Wayne-Fellows Productions
1954	Dangerous Mission	Musical score	RKO Radio Pictures
1955	The Americano	Musical score	RKO Radio Pictures / Robert Stillman Productions
1955	Bengazi	Music director	RKO Radio Pictures
1955	Blood Alley	Music director	Batjac Productions
1955	The Sea Chase	Music director	Warner Bros.
1955	Underwater!	Musical score	RKO Radio Pictures
1955	Marty	Music director	Hecht-Lancaster Productions
1956	The First Texan	Musical score	Allied Artists
1956	The Girl He Left Behind	Music director	Warner Bros.
1956	Our Miss Brooks	Music director	Lute Productions
1956	The River Changes	Music director	RKO Radio Pictures
1957	Shoot-Out at Medicine Bend	Music director	Warner Bros.
1957	Top Secret Affair	Music director	Warner Bros.
1958	Teacher's Pet	Musical score	Perlsea Co.
