= Laddie (1935 film) =

1935 film by George Stevens

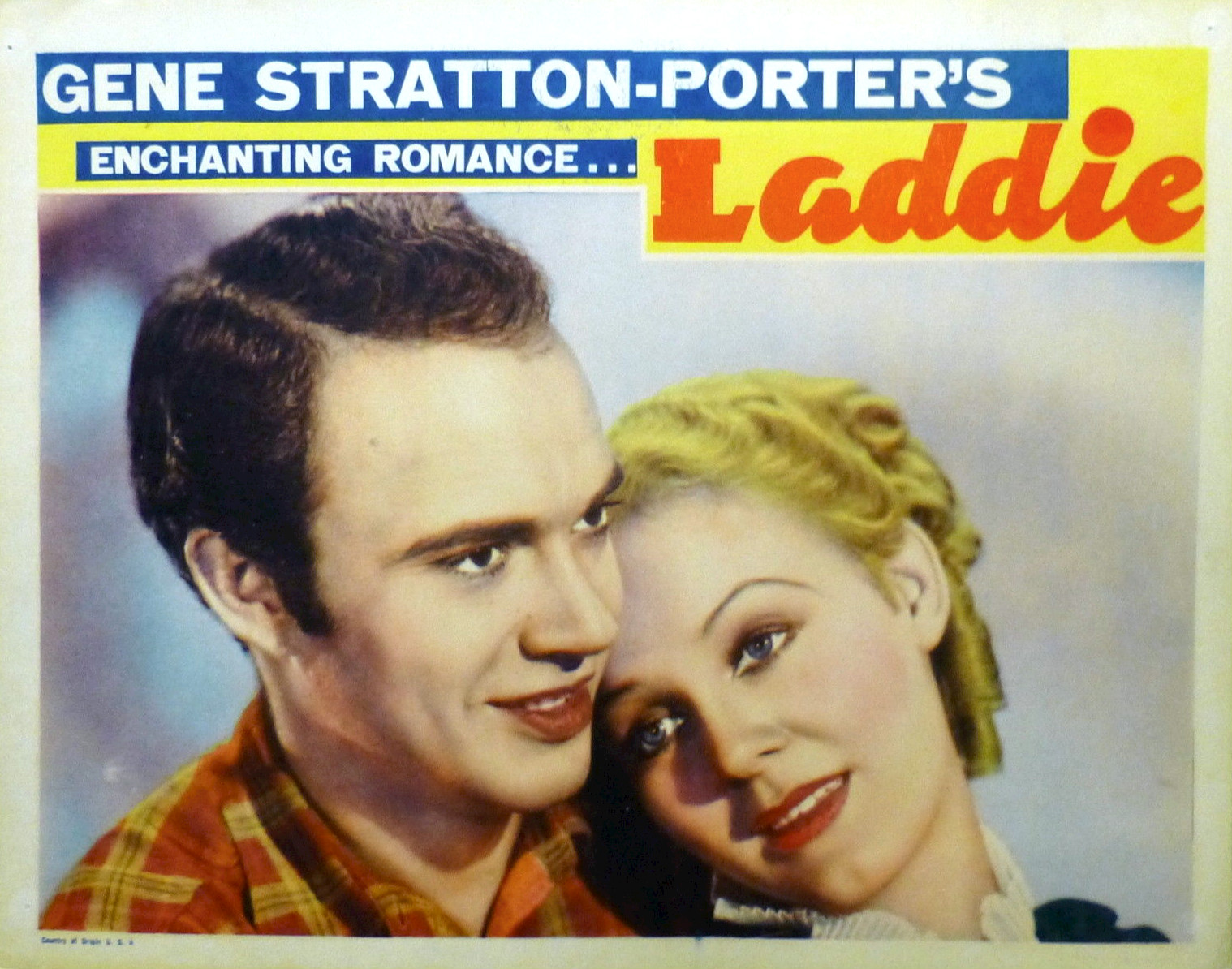
- Lobby card
- Directed by: George Stevens
- Written by: Ray Harris; Dorothy Yost
- Based on: the novel, Laddie: A True Blue Story by Gene Stratton-Porter
- Produced by: Pandro S. Berman; William Sistrom (associate)
- Starring: John Beal; Gloria Stuart; Virginia Weidler
- Cinematography: Harold Wenstrom
- Edited by: James Morley
- Music by: Roy Webb
- Production company: RKO Radio Pictures
- Release date: April 5, 1935 (US)
- Running time: 70 minutes
- Country: United States
- Language: English

Laddie is a 1935 American comedy-drama film directed by George Stevens from a screenplay by Ray Harris and Dorothy Yost, based on the 1913 novel, Laddie: A True Blue Story, by Gene Stratton-Porter. The film stars John Beal, Gloria Stuart, and Virginia Weidler.

== Plot ==
In the farmland of Indiana in 1853, a romance forms between Laddie Stanton, the farmer-boy, and his English neighbor, Pamela Pryor. Their love is aided by the support of Laddie's younger sister, who he calls “Little Sister.” After encountering Pamela in the enchanted woods, she is the one who initially introduces Laddie to Pamela. Yet, this romance is looked down upon by the Stanton Family, who view Pamela as a stuck-up princess, as well as by Charles Pryor, Pamela's father and the prim town squire, who views Laddie as a low-class farmer.

After the wedding of his sister Sally occurs, Laddie is inspired to turn his love for Pamela into marriage. But when Laddie approaches Charles and asks for his daughter's hand in marriage, he is angrily turned down on account of not having a gentlemanly profession. Angered by Laddie's actions, Pamela goes off into the woods, where she runs into her brother, Robert, who everyone thought was dead. As it turns out, he was alive and had rather been disowned by his father Charles and estranged from the Pryor family on account of supposedly stealing English military secrets. In their encounter, Pamela learns that Robert is very ill with a fever and sends him with Little Sister over to the Stanton household so he can get treatment.

After bringing Robert home, Little Sister encounters Charles in the woods and mistakenly reveals that Robert has returned, stating his whereabouts. Furious, Charles heads over to the Stanton house where he is met by Laddie and Mrs. Stanton. After being convinced that he should forgive and love Robert, Charles reunites with his son. Because of this, Laddie and Pamela are reunited and their romance continues.

== Cast ==
- John Beal as Laddie Stanton
- Gloria Stuart as Pamela Pryor
- Virginia Weidler as 'Little Sister' Stanton
- Donald Crisp as Mr. Pryor
- Dorothy Peterson as Mrs. Stanton
- Willard Robertson as Mrs. John Stanton
- William Bakewell as Robert Pryor
- Gloria Shea as Sally Stanton
- Charlotte Henry as Shelly Stanton

== Background ==
=== Inspiration ===
The film was adapted from the novel Laddie: A True Blue Story, which was written by Gene Stratton-Porter in 1913. The novel itself is somewhat autobiographical, as Porter based its setting, characters, and plot on her childhood life. As the youngest child in her farm family, Porter is represented by “Little Sister,” while “Laddie” is based on her favorite older brother, who she called Laddie. The farmland setting of the novel was inspired by the farm that Porter grew up on, and the enchanted forest setting was inspired by Porter's free rein to explore the natural world as a child.

=== Other adaptations ===
1. Laddie (1926): directed by James Leo Meehan and produced by Gene Stratton Porter Productions, featuring John Bowers, Bess Flowers, and Gene Stratton
2. Laddie (1940): directed by Jack Hively and produced by RKO Radio Picture Productions, featuring Tim Holt, Virginia Gilmore, and Joan Caroll.

== Release ==
The film adaptation was released by RKO Radio Picture Productions on April 5, 1935, after being filmed from January 3 to February 5. The black and white film had a screen running time of 70 minutes. Because Motion Picture Harold's preview running time was 82 minutes, it is likely that much of the film was edited out before being released. After being released, reviews of the film praised the acting and careful production, yet critiqued the plot, stating that it was outworn and unremarkable.

== Notes ==
Once a lost film, Laddie (1935) has since been recovered. When Laddie was remade in 1940 by RKO, most of the film prints of the 1935 adaptation were destroyed. Yet a single 35mm print remained at the Academy of Motion Picture Arts and Sciences. The film was preserved by the Academy Film Archive in 2013. It was restored as part of the academy's “Film to Film” project and shown publicly at the Los Angeles County Museum of Art in 2014.
