= Dick Rogers =

American singer, comedian, songwriter and pianist (1912–1970)

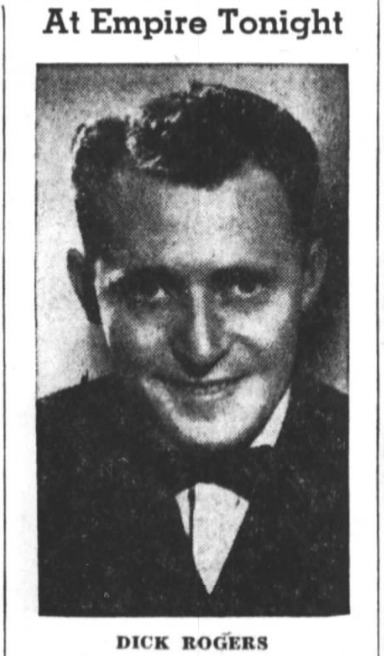
- Rogers appearing in a 1941 The Morning Call newspaper clipping titled "Empire Ballroom"

Background information
- Also known as: "Stinky" Rogers
- Born: September 23, 1912
- Origin: Philadelphia, Pennsylvania, U.S.
- Died: 1970 (aged 57–58)
- Genres: Traditional pop, jazz, comedy, swing, ragtime
- Occupations: Musician, lyricist, bandleader, songwriter, composer, whistler
- Instrument: Piano
- Years active: ~1934–~1955
- Labels: Okeh, Columbia, Decca, Varsity, Associated
- Formerly of: The Ray Noble Orchestra; The Will Osborne Band

Richard Rogers (1912–1970) was a singer, comedian, songwriter, and pianist, who wrote the lyrics for "Harlem Nocturne". He was a member of the Ray Noble Orchestra and the Will Osborne Band.

Rogers was associated with Will Osborne, a "star crooner" who was on the radio in the 1930s. Osborne's band was on the decline in 1940. Osborne created a "bus and truck vaudeville show", with comedy acts, which did not do well. Dick was hired on as "Stinky" Rogers, doing a singing comedy act. When Osborne moved to Hollywood in 1940, Rogers took over the band. He did well, according to a Billboard review in 1942, who said he "...acquitted himself credibly, as did his orchestra." The magazine called him capable, saying he could sing, compose, play and lead.

== Composed music or lyrics ==
- "Harlem Nocturne" (1939) (with Earle Hagen)
- "Pompton Turnpike" (played by Charlie Barnet) (written with Will Osborne) (1940)
- "Spaghetti Rag" (music by Lyons and Yosco) (1950)
- "Magazines (Are Magic for Lonely People)" (sung by Theresa Brewer) (1958)
- "I Guess I'll Get the Papers and Go Home" (sung by the Mills Brothers, written with Hughie Prince, Hal Kanner) (1946)
- "Would'st Could I But Kiss Thy Hand, Oh Babe" (written with Will Osborne) (sung by "Doghouse" Dale Jones)
- "Between 18th And 19th On Chestnut Street" (written with Will Osborne) (sung by Dale Jones and Dick Rogers) (1939)
- Dozens more.
