= Street of Chance =

Street of Chance may refer to:

- Street of Chance (1930 film)
- Street of Chance (1942 film)
