= Western Union (film) =

1941 American Western film

- Theatrical release poster
- Directed by: Fritz Lang
- Screenplay by: Robert Carson
- Based on: Western Union by Zane Grey
- Produced by: Darryl F. Zanuck (executive producer, uncredited); Harry Joe Brown (associate producer)
- Starring: Robert Young; Randolph Scott; Dean Jagger
- Cinematography: Edward Cronjager; Allen M. Davey
- Edited by: Robert Bischoff
- Music by: David Buttolph
- Production company: 20th Century Fox
- Distributed by: 20th Century Fox
- Release date: February 21, 1941 (US)
- Running time: 95 minutes
- Country: United States
- Language: English

Western Union is a 1941 American Western film directed by Fritz Lang and starring Robert Young, Randolph Scott, and Dean Jagger. Filmed in Technicolor on location in Arizona and Utah. In Western Union, Scott plays a reformed outlaw who tries to make good by joining the team building a telegraph line across the Great Plains in 1861. Conflicts arise between the man and his former gang, as well as between the team stringing the wires and the Native Americans through whose land the new lines must run. The film is based on the 1939 novel Western Union by Zane Grey, although there are significant differences between the two plots. It received positive reviews from critics.

== Plot ==
While surveying a telegraph line in 1861, Western Union engineer Edward Creighton is severely injured in an accident. He is discovered by Vance Shaw, an outlaw on the run from a posse. Forced to travel on foot after his horse was hurt, Shaw at first considers stealing Creighton's horse, but changes his mind and takes the man with him, saving his life.

Sometime later, following his recovery, Creighton returns to Omaha, Nebraska and plans the construction of a telegraph line from Omaha to Salt Lake City, Utah. Facing considerable opposition to the line from Confederate soldiers, Indians, and outlaws, Creighton elicits the help of his sister Sue, foreman Pat Grogan, and assistant Homer Kettle.

Looking to put his outlaw past behind him, Shaw arrives at Creighton's Western Union office looking for honest work and is hired as a scout by Grogan who is unaware of his past. Creighton recognizes him among the men and allows him to stay despite his suspicions. Creighton also hires tenderfoot Richard Blake, a Harvard-educated engineer, as a favor to Blake's father. Shaw and Blake are both attracted to Sue and vie for her attention, but their romantic rivalry is cut short when construction of the telegraph line starts on July 4, 1861.

After work commences on the line, one of the men is killed, apparently by a mysterious band of cattle-rustling Indians. Unconvinced that Indians are to blame, Shaw rides out to investigate and follows the rustlers' trail to the camp of Jack Slade, a former friend and cohort, whose gang committed the killing disguised as Indians—the gang Shaw left following his last bank robbery. Slade reveals that they are working for the Confederacy to disrupt Western Union because they believe the telegraph service will help the Union. Shaw rides away and returns to the line. Not wanting to turn in his former friends, Shaw tells Creighton that a large band of Dakota Indians stole the cattle, and recommends that they simply replace the herd and not risk a fight with the Indians.

Sometime later, a confrontation takes place between men working on the forward line and a band of drunken Indians. When one of the Indians tries to steal some equipment, a nervous Blake shoots him, ignoring Shaw's order to remain calm. After word arrives that the main camp is under attack by other Indians, the Western Union men rush back to help with the defense. At the main camp, Slade's men, who are again disguised as Indians, steal the Western Union horses. The company discover the ruse when one of the wounded Indians turns out to be a white man. Forced to buy back their stolen horses from Slade, Creighton becomes suspicious of Shaw's involvement, especially when he admits to knowing the gang.

Soon the U.S. Army arrives and announces the Indians have now refused to allow the telegraph lines to go through their territory in response to Blake's shooting of the drunken Indian. Creighton, Shaw, and Blake ride out to convince Chief Spotted Horse to allow them to build the line through Indian territory, even though the man Blake wounded was Spotted Horse's son. Creighton demonstrates electricity to persuade the Indians to allow them passage, and work continues until the company approaches Salt Lake City.

Sometime later, Shaw receives word that Jack Slade wants to meet with him. On the way to see Slade, Shaw is captured and bound by Slade's men. Slade says his group is going to burn down the Western Union camp and they don't want Shaw to interfere. After Slade and his men ride off, Shaw escapes from his ropes (using the smoldering embers of Slade's campfire), but returns too late to prevent the fire. He helps rescue some of the Western Union men from the flames and burns his hands in the process (or so he lets everyone believe as he burnt them in the campfire).

After the fire, Creighton confronts Shaw for an explanation, but Shaw does not reveal what he knows and is fired by Creighton. As Shaw leaves the camp, he tells Blake that Slade is actually Shaw's brother and that he, Shaw, will find Slade's gang and stop them from interfering with the telegraph project. Shaw rides off and finds Slade and his men in a nearby town. At the barber shop, Shaw confronts his brother, whose gun is concealed under the barber's sheet. Slade shoots Shaw through the sheet. Shaw fights back in spite of his wound, killing some of the gang members, and then dies. Blake arrives and continues the fight with Slade who dies from his wounds. Soon after, the Western Union line is completed and the workers celebrate. When Sue laments the absence of Shaw, Creighton tells her that Shaw can hear them.

== Cast ==
- Robert Young as Richard Blake
- Randolph Scott as Vance Shaw
- Dean Jagger as Edward Creighton
- Virginia Gilmore as Sue Creighton
- John Carradine as Doc Murdoch
- Barton MacLane as Jack Slade
- Russell Hicks as Governor
- Slim Summerville as Cookie
- Chill Wills as Homer Kettle
- Victor Kilian as Charlie
- Minor Watson as Pat Grogan
- George Chandler as Herb
- Chief John Big Tree as Chief Spotted Horse
- Chief Thundercloud as Indian leader
- Dick Rich as Porky
- Addison Richards as Capt. Harlow
- Irving Bacon as Joe the Barber
- Hank Bell as Telegraph Worker (uncredited)
- Tom London as Henchman (uncredited)
- Charles Middleton as Stagecoach Rider (uncredited)

== Production ==
=== Filming locations ===
- 20th Century Fox Studios, 10201 Pico Blvd., Century City, Los Angeles, California, USA
- Fredonia, Arizona
- Johnson Canyon, Paria, the Gap, and Alton in Utah

=== Soundtrack ===
- "Camptown Races" (Stephen Foster) as background music for the first scene in Omaha, Nebraska
- "Little Brown Jug" (Joseph Winner) played in a saloon
- "Bury Me Not on the Lone Prairie" (Traditional) integrated throughout the film

== Reception ==
On the review aggregator website Rotten Tomatoes, 75% of 8 critics' reviews are positive.

In The New York Times, reviewer Bosley Crowther called the film "spectacular screen entertainment" and applauded director Lang's ability to take a "firmly-constructed fiction" and keep it interesting with "plenty of action and colorful incident." Describing Western Union as "one of the finest color films ever seen", Crowther attributes the excellent use of Technicolor for a large share of the film's excitement, producing "breath-taking shots of vast stretches of prairie across which the construction gang is seen drawing its tiny wire". Crowther also singles out the "superior quality" of the acting performances in Western Union:

Randolph Scott, who is getting to look and act more and more like William S. Hart, herein shapes one of the truest and most appreciable characters of his career as the party's scout. Dean Jagger is the cool and determined chief engineer of the wire-laying gang—a portrait of the real Edward Creighton which does that gentleman worthy justice. And Robert Young as a 'dude from the East,' Slim Summerville as a terrified cook, Chill Wills as a leather-skinned lineman and Virginia Gilmore as the unobtrusive 'love interest' are just four of a generally excellent cast.

== Preservation ==
The Academy Film Archive preserved Western Union in 2000.
