= Attack! The Battle of New Britain =

1944 film

- Written by: Robert Presnell
- Produced by: Frank Capra; Army Signal Corps; Army Air Forces
- Narrated by: Lloyd Nolan
- Cinematography: Jack Hively
- Edited by: Jack Hively
- Music by: Dimitri Tiomkin (uncredited)
- Distributed by: Office of War Information
- Release date: June 20, 1944
- Running time: 54 minutes
- Country: United States
- Language: English

Attack! The Battle of New Britain is a documentary/propaganda film produced by the US military in 1944. It details, as its name implies, the New Britain campaign, which was part of the New Guinea and Solomon Islands Campaigns during World War II.

The film follows a rather standard format: it is a chronological narrative of the campaign from the arrival of the soldiers in New Guinea to their capture of most of the island. Opening with travelers book pictures of the area, reminding the audience what the average soldier image of what the South Seas would be like, and it then details the natural hazards of fighting, or even being in the jungle, including the insects, diseases and heat. The marines and soldiers set up a little tent city, with the significant help of the local natives or "fuzzy wuzzies". After the base has been established and enough men are ready, General Douglas MacArthur arrives in person to discuss the upcoming campaign with the unit's CO.

With the aid of maps and non-combat footage, the audience learns about the plans for the attack, the geography of the island, and the variety of armored vehicles that will be used in the upcoming battle, including the "alligator" and "buffalo" amphibious assault vehicles. D–day is on Christmas, and while the sailors and marines assemble in the rear, the airmen spend Christmas Eve strafing the island, to make way for their comrades' assault. The campaign is then followed through chronologically, focusing, at the end, on the many wounded and killed who have sacrificed so much.

== See also ==
- List of Allied propaganda films of World War II
