= Sundown Jim =

1942 film by James Tinling

- Theatrical release poster
- Directed by: James Tinling
- Screenplay by: William Bruckner; Robert F. Metzler
- Story by: Ernest Haycox
- Produced by: Sol M. Wurtzel
- Starring: John Kimbrough; Virginia Gilmore; Arleen Whelan; Joe Sawyer; Paul Hurst; Moroni Olsen
- Cinematography: Glen MacWilliams
- Edited by: Nick DeMaggio
- Music by: Cyril J. Mockridge
- Production company: 20th Century Fox
- Distributed by: 20th Century Fox
- Release date: March 27, 1942
- Running time: 63 minutes
- Country: United States
- Language: English

Sundown Jim is a 1942 American Western film directed by James Tinling, written by William Bruckner and Robert F. Metzler, and starring John Kimbrough, Virginia Gilmore, Arleen Whelan, Joe Sawyer, Paul Hurst and Moroni Olsen. It was released on March 27, 1942, by 20th Century Fox.

Kimbrough was a star player for the undefeated 1939 Texas A&M Aggies football team who made two Western movies, then returned to Texas to become a member of the state legislature.

== Plot ==
Into the town of Resurrection rides a lawman, "Sundown" Jim Majors, who finds himself in the middle of a feud. A rancher's daughter, Tony Black, is angry because her father was shot by hired guns working for rival rancher Andrew Barr, including outlaw Ben Moffitt.

Jim intervenes, retrieving U.S. mail stolen by the gang and meeting Barr's daughter Catherine, who knows that her father hired gunmen after causing anger with recent land transactions. Moffitt eventually double-crosses Barr, killing him, before Jim defeats him and his gang with Tony's help. Offered to stay as the town's new marshal, Jim accepts and begins planning a wedding with Catherine.

== Cast ==
- John Kimbrough as Sundown Jim Majors
- Virginia Gilmore as Tony Black
- Arleen Whelan as Catherine Barr
- Joe Sawyer as Ben Moffitt
- Paul Hurst as Broderick
- Moroni Olsen as Andrew Barr
- Don Costello as Dobe Hyde
- LeRoy Mason as Henchman Brick
- Lane Chandler as Nat Oldroyd
- James Bush as Ring Barr
- Charles Tannen as Dan Barr
- Cliff Edwards as Stable proprietor
- Paul Sutton as Henchman Dale
- Eddy Waller as Clem Black
- Tom Fadden as Stagecoach driver
- Frank McGrath as Outlaw
