= Joan Carroll =

Child actress (1931–2016)

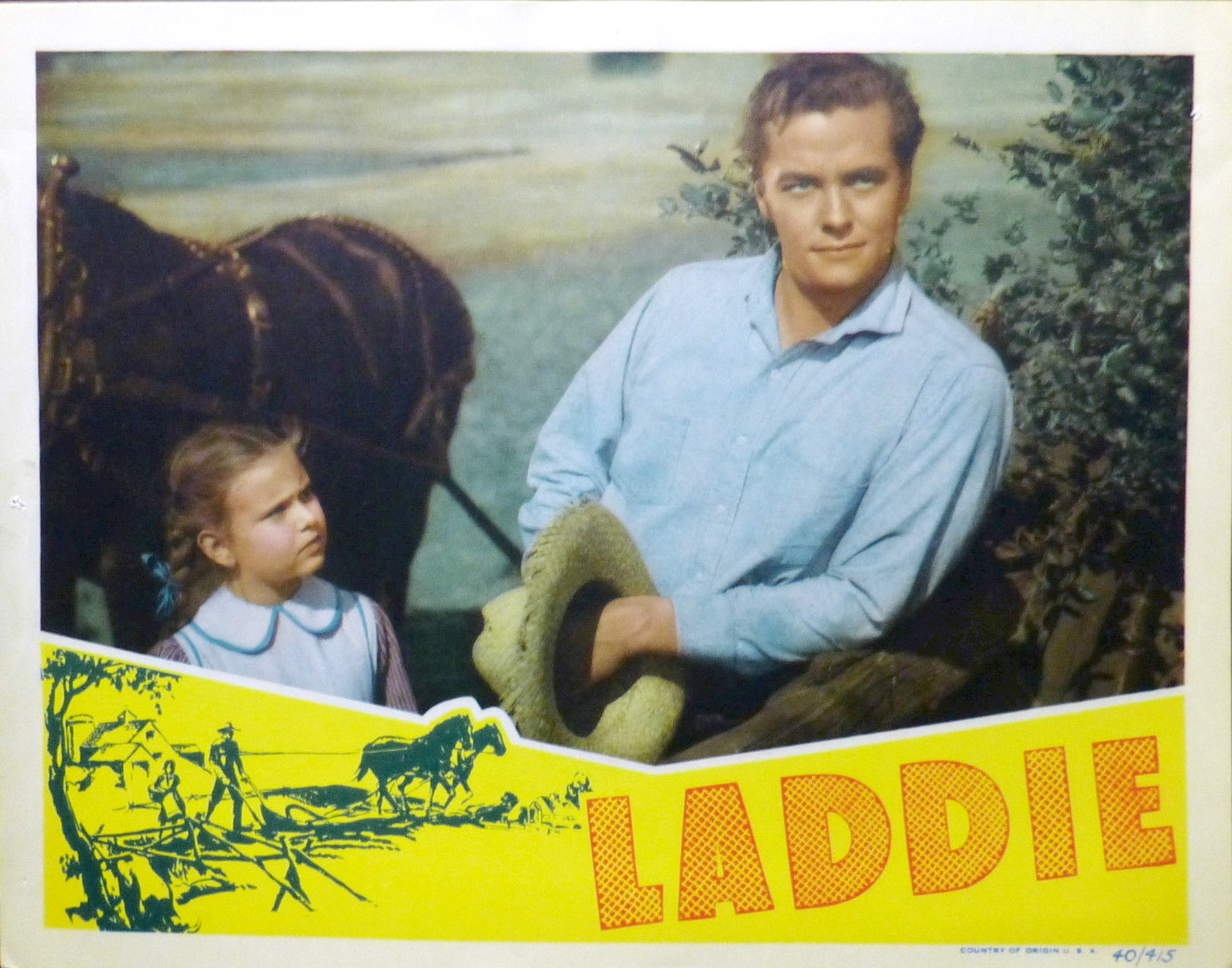
- Carroll in Laddie (1940) with Tim Holt.
- Born: Joan Marie Felt; January 18, 1931; Elizabeth, New Jersey, U.S.
- Died: November 16, 2016 (aged 85); Puerto Vallarta, Mexico
- Years active: 1936–1969
- Spouse: James Joseph Krack (m. 1951; div. 1969)
- Children: 4

Joan Carroll (born Joan Marie Felt, January 18, 1931 - November 16, 2016) was an American child actress who appeared in films until retiring in 1950.

== Childhood career ==
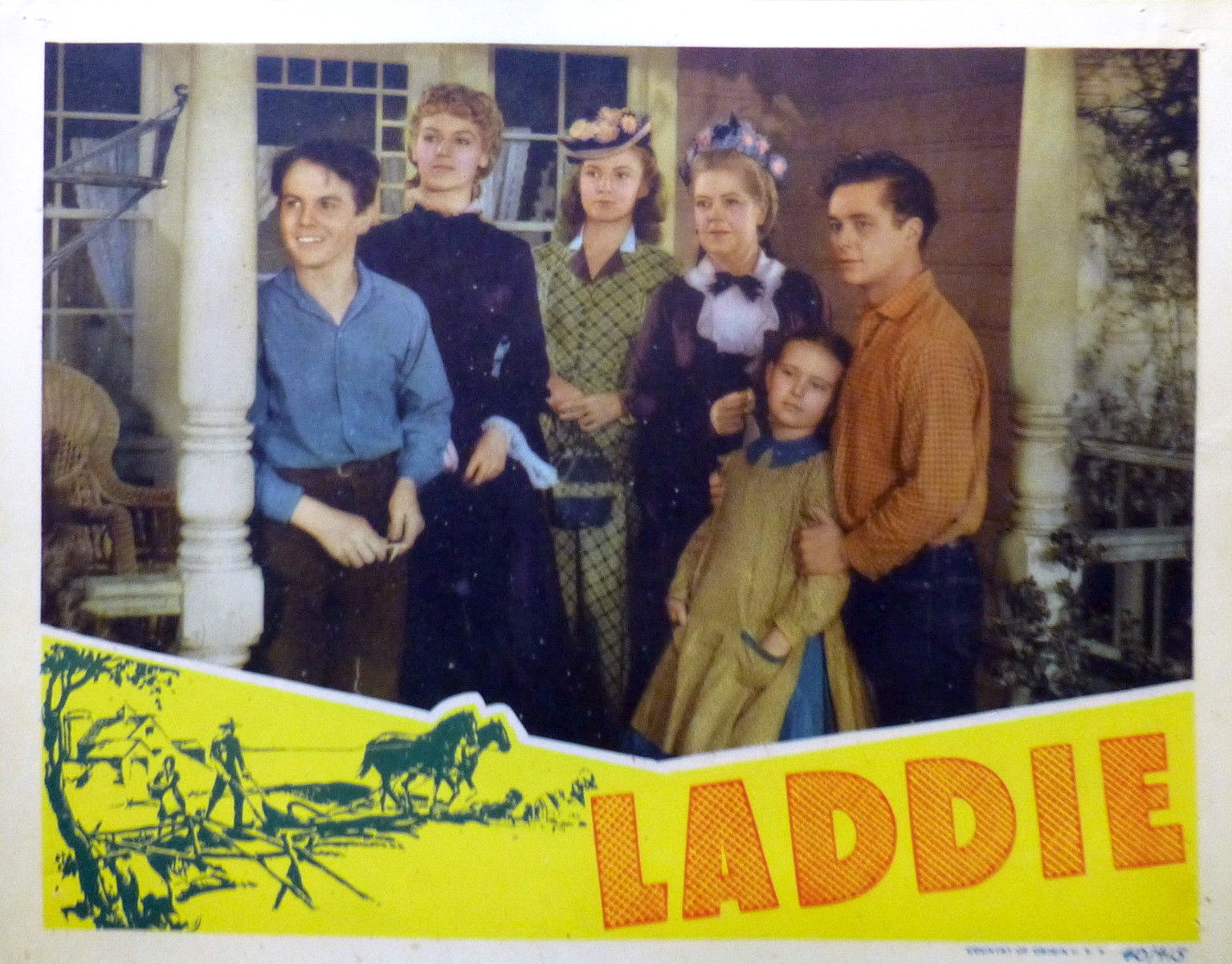
Lobby card for Laddie (1940). L-R: Sammy McKim, Martha O'Driscoll, Joan Leslie, Spring Byington, Joan Carroll and Tim Holt.

Carroll was born Joan Marie Felt to Wright and Freida Felt on January 18, 1931.

Carroll developed into an excellent singer and tap dancer at the Fanchon and Marco Dancing School in Hollywood, and became an accomplished child actress. Her stage name was changed to Carol and then Carroll.

Between 1937 and 1940 she appeared in supporting roles in several movies. Her big break came the 1940 film, Primrose Path, as Ginger Rogers's younger sister, for which she won a Critics Award. The same year she became the first child star to be summoned from Hollywood in order to appear in the leading role in a Broadway musical, Panama Hattie, which ran from October 30, 1940, to January 3, 1942.

Carroll became RKO Radio Pictures' resident juvenile personality in both "A" and "B" pictures. RKO starred Carroll in the leading role with Ruth Warrick in two zany comedy vehicles, Obliging Young Lady (1941) and Petticoat Larceny (1943). She continued to work in films as an adolescent, but less frequently. Two of her best-remembered pictures came from this period: Meet Me in St. Louis (1944) as Judy Garland and Margaret O'Brien's sister, and The Bells of St. Mary's (1945), in which she played "the sensitive child of separated parents."

== Later life and death ==
After 1950, Carroll retired. In 1951, she married James Krack.

She and her brother donated a historic family lamp to the Nevada State Museum on July 7, 2011.

Carroll died near her home in Puerto Vallarta, Mexico, on November 16, 2016, aged 85. She was survived by her four children and extended family.

== Filmography ==
Year	Title	Role	Notes
1936	The First Baby		
1937	One Mile from Heaven	Sunny	
1938	Walking Down Broadway	Sunny Martin	
1938	Gateway	Child	(uncredited)
1938	Two Sisters	Sally, as a child	
1939	Mr. Moto's Last Warning	Mary Delacour	(as Joan Carol)
1939	Tower of London	Lady Mowbray	(uncredited)
1939	A Child Is Born	Little Girl	(uncredited)
1939	Barricade	Winifred Ward	
1940	Laddie	Sister Stanton	
1940	Primrose Path	Honeybell	
1940	Anne of Windy Poplars	Betty Grayson	
1942	Obliging Young Lady	Bridget Potter	(starring role)
1943	Petticoat Larceny	Joan "Small Change" Mitchell	(starring role)
1944	Meet Me in St. Louis	Agnes Smith	
1944	Tomorrow the World	Pat Frame	
1945	The Clock	Girl in Penn Station	(uncredited)
1945	The Bells of St. Mary's	Patsy Gallagher	
1950	Second Chance	Nurse Eva	

== Bibliography ==
- Best, Marc. Those Endearing Young Charms: Child Performers of the Screen. South Brunswick and New York: Barnes & Co., 1971, pp. 20–24; ISBN 0498077292 / ISBN 9780498077296
