= Swing Parade of 1946 =

1946 American film by Phil Karlson

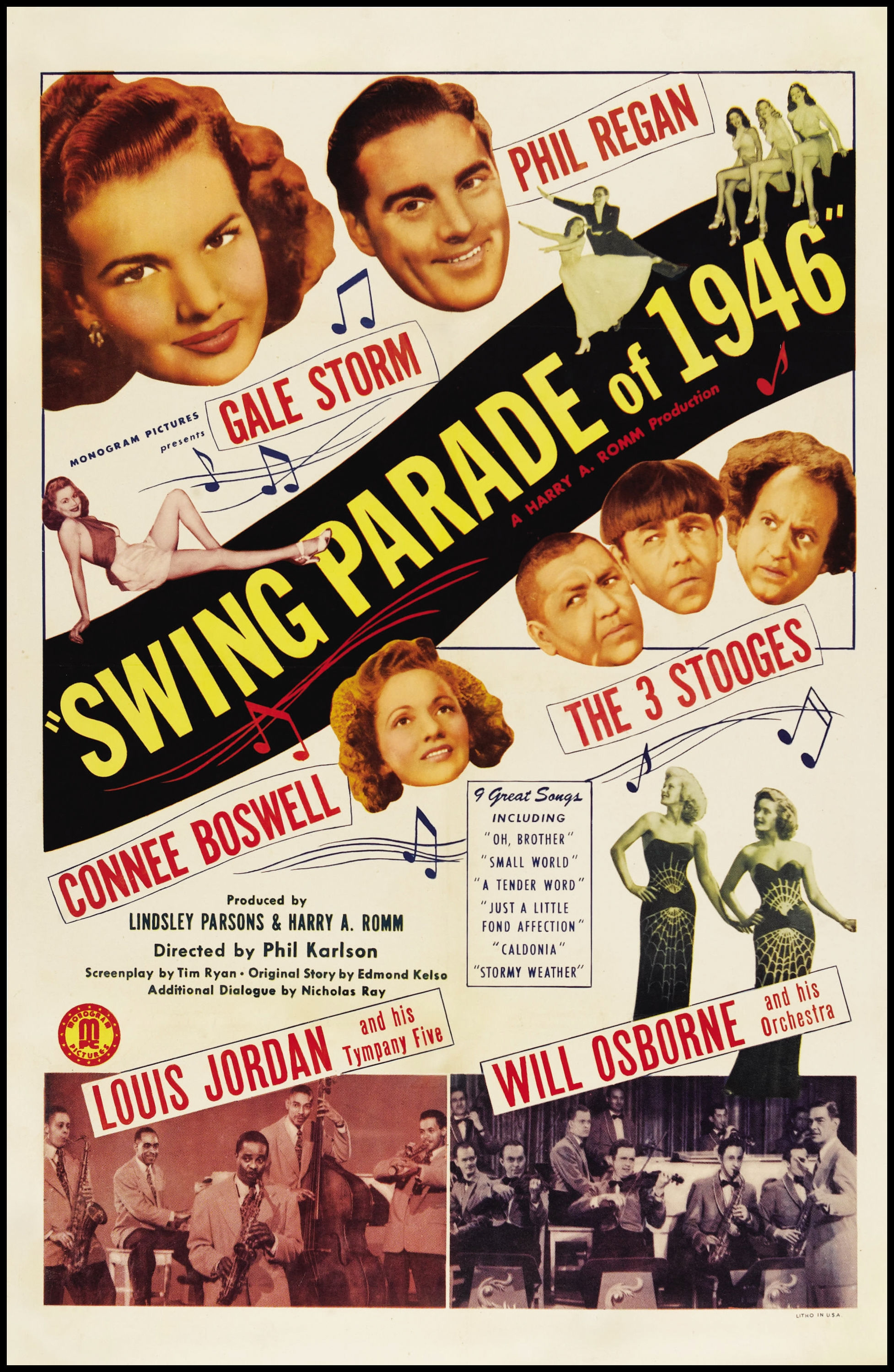
- Film poster
- Directed by: Phil Karlson
- Written by: Tim Ryan (screenplay); Edmond Kelso (story); Nicholas Ray (additional dialogue)
- Produced by: Lindsley Parsons; Harry A. Romm; Trem Carr
- Starring: Gale Storm; Phil Regan; Moe Howard; Larry Fine; Jerome Howard
- Cinematography: Harry Neumann
- Edited by: Richard Currier
- Music by: Edward J. Kay
- Distributed by: Monogram Pictures
- Release date: March 16, 1946
- Running time: 73 minutes
- Country: United States
- Language: English

Swing Parade of 1946 is a 1946 musical comedy film directed by Phil Karlson and released by Monogram Pictures. The film features Gale Storm, Phil Regan, The Three Stooges (Moe Howard, Larry Fine and Curly Howard), Edward Brophy, and musical numbers by Connee Boswell and the Louis Jordan and Will Osborne orchestras, including "Stormy Weather" and "Caldonia".

== Plot ==
Tycoon Daniel Warren, Sr. (Russell Hicks) is opposed to his son Danny (Phil Regan) opening a nightclub. The tycoon hires unemployed singer Carol Lawrence (Gale Storm) to serve legal papers on Danny to shut down the club, but instead Danny hires Carol to sing in his show. The Three Stooges are Danny's handymen, called upon to wash dishes, fix the plumbing, and fill in as waiters. When Warren Sr. persists in his efforts, Warren Jr. learns about Carol and the legal papers, causing a rift in their romance. The misunderstanding is only temporary, however, and the club opens to great success.

== The Three Stooges' appearance ==
The Three Stooges' appearance in the film was arranged by their agent, Harry Romm. This was Romm's first effort as a movie producer; he had established himself at General Amusement Corporation (GAC) in charge of its theaters. Romm co-produced Swing Parade of 1946 with Monogram staff producer Lindsley Parsons.

The Stooges reworked several bits they performed with Ted Healy at MGM: the plumbing sequence was adapted from A Plumbing We Will Go and several waiter gags were borrowed from Beer and Pretzels. The 42-year-old Curly Howard had suffered a series of minor strokes several months prior to filming, and his performances in their Columbia shorts at that time were often sluggish and lethargic. He had lost a considerable amount of weight, and had difficulty maintaining his trademark falsetto voice. He appears somewhat healthier and more animated in Swing Parade of 1946, however, possibly due to the Stooges' supporting roles being less strenuous than in the shorts, where Curly was in virtually every scene. He is also billed as "Jerome Howard" in the credits for the first time in many years.

== Production ==
Swing Parade of 1946 was filmed over a period of 24 days between July 30 and August 25, 1945. Monogram's economical features were generally filmed in nine to fourteen days, a speedy schedule as full-length features went, but Gale Storm was the studio's leading star and her films received preferred treatment.

The studio announced that the Stooges' frequent colleague Del Lord would direct, and also serve as associate producer. Lord withdrew from the project, forcing Monogram to assign a new associate producer (Trem Carr) and a new director. The young Phil Karlson had recently proven his abilities on Monogram features, using special lighting and staging to make his films look more elaborate than the budgets allowed. He was selected to direct Swing Parade of 1946, slated to be one of the studio's most important releases of 1946. Future director Nicholas Ray worked uncredited on the screenplay; this was Ray's only collaboration with the Three Stooges.

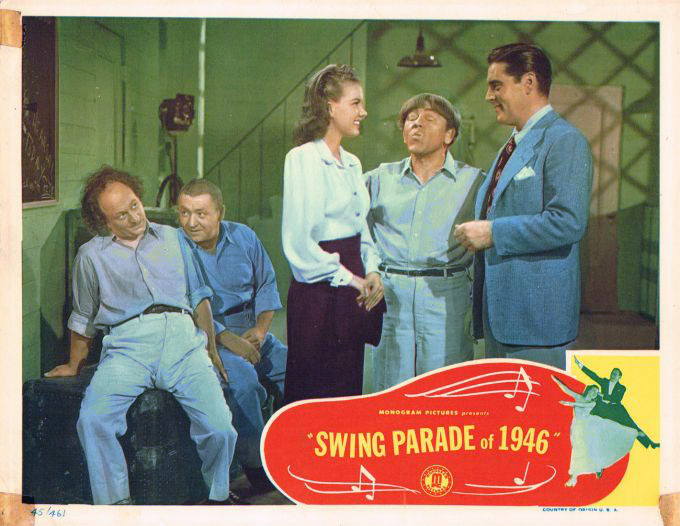
Lobby card

== Promotion ==
Monogram arranged for the film's original songs to be extensively promoted and widely recorded before the film's release. Performers Phil Regan and Will Osborne appeared on network radio shows, Gene Krupa recorded one song with The King Sisters, and a trade paper reported that other songs "are getting a heavy play by the nation's orchestras."

The studio released Swing Parade of 1946 as a light companion to one of its dramatic features, Suspense. The musical was offered as part of a ready-made double-feature program, or it could be shown on its own as a second feature in large theaters, or the main attraction in small theaters.

== Reception ==
Swing Parade of 1946 received very good to excellent reviews. Showmen's Trade Review called it "a top-flight musical worthy of a topspot in most situations... Credit for this unusually good musical goes to Harry A. Romm and Lindsley Parsons, co-producers." Trade publisher Pete Harrison classed it "an agreeable combination of music, comedy, and romance, good enough to top a double bill in small-town and neighborhood houses.". Columnist Thalia Bell covered the preview: "Here's a musical that wisely concentrates on music, and the result is one of the best bundles of entertainment to come from Monogram to date... Previewed at the Alexander theatre, Glendale, whose audience was delighted with the offering."

Character comedian Edward Brophy, who had appeared with the Stooges in 1934, was reunited with the team here, playing their short-tempered supervisor. Brophy turned in a fine performance but was angered by the finished product, as reported by Independent Exhibitors Film Bulletin: "Edward S. Brophy (who sued Monogram because he didn't receive star billing in this) is completely overshadowed by the Three Stooges, whose slapstick antics are good for many laughs, and by Windy Cook, whose plane and motorcycle imitations will keep naborhood [sic] patrons in stitches."

The Swing Parade of 1946 title was inspired by other studios' annual musical revues ("The Big Broadcast of...", "The Broadway Melody of...", "The Hit Parade of..."), but there was no Swing Parade of 1947. By that time, producer Lindsley Parsons had been reassigned from the Gale Storm series to the new Bowery Boys series, and Monogram had established a deluxe division, Allied Artists Productions, dedicated to higher-budgeted pictures that would not be associated with the Monogram brand name. The studio later retitled Swing Parade of 1946, masking the last two words on the screen. On most prints circulating today, the title reads Swing Parade.

== Cast ==
- Gale Storm as Carol Lawrence
- Phil Regan as Danny Warren, Jr.
- The Three Stooges: Jerome Howard, Larry Fine, and Moe Howard
- Edward Brophy as Moose
- Mary Treen as Marie Finch
- Russell Hicks as Daniel Warren, Sr.
- John Eldredge as Bascomb, Daniel Warren's attorney
- Leon Belasco as Pete Welsh, dance director
- Dewey Robinson as process server
- Edward Earle as nightclub patron
- Edna Holland as Mrs. Greene, landlady

Specialties by:

- Connee Boswell
- Louis Jordan and His Tympany Five
- Will Osborne and His Orchestra
- Windy Cook, sound-effects impersonator

== See also ==
- The Three Stooges filmography
