= Mary Treen =

American actress (1907–1989)

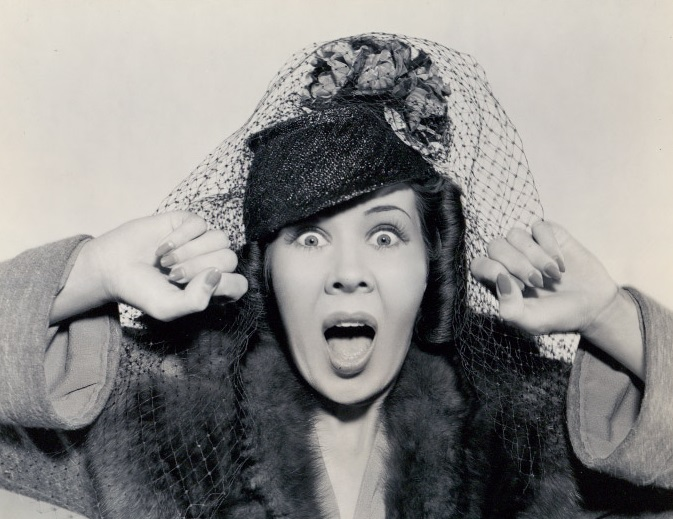
- Treen in 1938
- Born: Mary Louise Summers; March 27, 1907; St. Louis, Missouri, U.S.
- Died: July 20, 1989 (aged 82); Newport Beach, California, U.S.
- Occupation: Actress
- Years active: 1930–1983
- Spouse: Herbert C. Pearson (m. 1944; died 1965)
- Family: Mort Mills (cousin)

Mary Treen (born Mary Louise Summers; March 27, 1907 – July 20, 1989) was an American film and television actress. A minor actress for much of her career, she managed to secure a plain, unassuming niche for herself in dozens of movies and television shows in a Hollywood career spanning five decades, from 1930 to 1981.

== Early life ==
Treen was born Mary Louise Summers in St. Louis, and she grew up in California. She was the daughter of attorney Don C. Summers and actress Helene Sullivan Summers. In 1908, when she was 11 months old, her mother sued her father for divorce on the grounds that he failed to provide for her. Her father died while she was an infant. She was reared in California by her mother and stepfather, a physician. She attended Westlake School for Girls and, later, a convent school where she tried out successfully in school plays.

== Career ==
Treen first worked in show business as a dancer, part of the Fanchon and Marco revues. During her career, she was seen in over 40 films (another source says more than 100). Among her film roles were Tilly, the secretary of the Building and Loan, in Frank Capra's It's a Wonderful Life (1946) starring James Stewart, and the role of Pat in the drama Kitty Foyle (1940) starring Ginger Rogers.

In the 1954–1955 season, Treen appeared in 38 episodes as Emily Dodger on the CBS situation comedy Willy.

Her longest-running role was as Hilda, the maid and baby nurse in 64 episodes of the NBC and CBS sitcom The Joey Bishop Show from 1962 to 1965.

== Personal life and death ==
Treen was married and divorced. She died of cancer at her home in Newport Beach, California, on July 20, 1989, at age 82. Her only survivors were cousins, including actor Mort Mills. A Republican, she voted for Dwight D. Eisenhower in the 1952 presidential election and she was of the Catholic faith.

== Partial filmography ==
=== Film ===
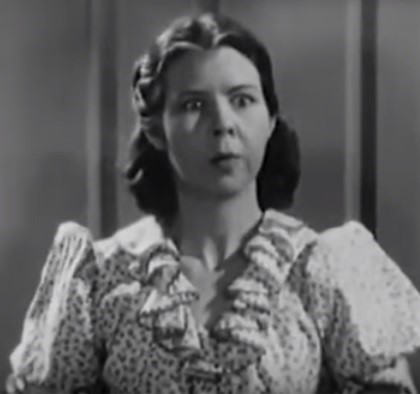
Treen in Danger on Wheels (1940)

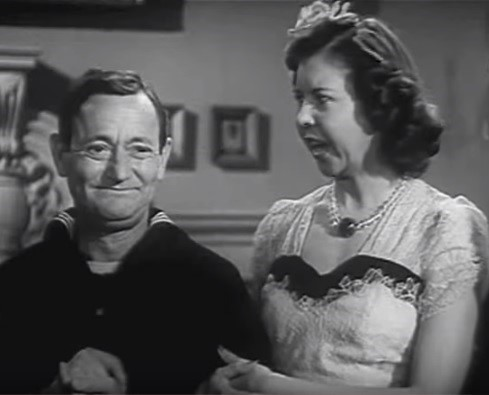
Roscoe Karns and Treen in The Navy Way (1944)

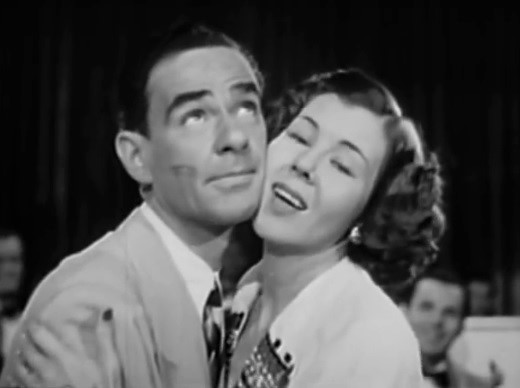
Will Osborne and Treen in Swing Parade of 1946 (1946)

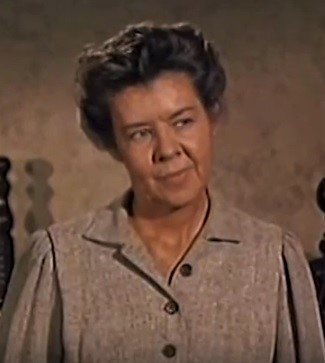
Treen in TV series Bonanza 1961 episode "The Spitfire"

- Viennese Nights (1930) – Shocked Woman on Street (uncredited)
- Crooner (1932) – One of Teddy's Fans (uncredited)
- Jimmy the Gent (1934) – Nurse (scenes deleted)
- Happiness Ahead (1934) – Bob's Comedienne Friend
- The St. Louis Kid (1934) – Giddy Girl (scenes deleted)
- Babbitt (1934) – Miss McGoun, Babbitt's Secretary
- Maybe It's Love (1935) – Secretary (uncredited)
- Red Hot Tires (1935) – Maggie
- Sweet Music (1935) – Girl at the Railroad (uncredited)
- A Night at the Ritz (1935) – Isabelle, Hassler's Secretary
- Traveling Saleslady (1935) – Miss Wells
- The Case of the Curious Bride (1935) – Telegraph Office Clerk (uncredited)
- G Men (1935) – Gregory's Secretary (uncredited)
- Go into Your Dance (1935) – Silent Showgirl (uncredited)
- The Girl from 10th Avenue (1935) – Secretary (uncredited)
- Front Page Woman (1935) – Nurse (uncredited)
- Don't Bet on Blondes (1935) – Owen's secretary
- Broadway Gondolier (1935) – 2nd Irate Caller (uncredited)
- Page Miss Glory (1935) – Beauty Shop Operator
- I Live for Love (1935) – Clementine – Donna's Maid
- The Case of the Lucky Legs (1935) – Spudsy's Wife
- Shipmates Forever (1935) – Cowboy's Girl (uncredited)
- I Found Stella Parish (1935) – Sob Sister (uncredited)
- Miss Pacific Fleet (1935) – Violet Johnson – Butch's Girl (uncredited)
- Broadway Hostess (1935) – Nurse (uncredited)
- Dangerous (1935) – Huree – a Nurse (uncredited)
- The Murder of Dr. Harrigan (1936) – Nurse Margaret Brody
- Freshman Love (1936) – Squirmy
- Colleen (1936) – Miss Hively – Cedric's Secretary (uncredited)
- Brides Are Like That (1936) – Jennie
- Snowed Under (1936) – Secretary Taking Mike's Dictation (uncredited)
- The Singing Kid (1936) – Secretary (scenes deleted)
- The Golden Arrow (1936) – Appleby's Secretary (uncredited)
- Murder by an Aristocrat (1936) – Florrie
- Public Enemy's Wife (1936) – Telephone Operator (uncredited)
- Jailbreak (1936) – Gladys Joy
- Love Begins at 20 (1936) – Alice Gillingwater
- Stage Struck (1936) – Ms. Warren (uncredited)
- Down the Stretch (1936) – Nurse
- The Captain's Kid (1936) – Libby, the Housekeeper
- Fugitive in the Sky (1936) – Agatha Ormsby
- God's Country and the Woman (1937) – Miss Flint
- Maid of Salem (1937) – Susy Abbott
- They Gave Him a Gun (1937) – Saxe
- The Go Getter (1937) – Mrs. Blair
- Ever Since Eve (1937) – Employment Clerk
- Dance Charlie Dance (1937) – Jennie Wolfe – Arden's Agent
- Marry the Girl (1937) – Kidnapped Nurse (uncredited)
- Talent Scout (1937) – Janet Morris
- Mr. Dodd Takes the Air (1937) – Fan with Locket (uncredited)
- Second Honeymoon (1937) – Elsie
- Missing Witnesses (1937) – Woman Waiting in Lane's Office (uncredited)
- Change of Heart (1938) – Stenographer (uncredited)
- Swing It, Sailor! (1938) – Gertie Burns
- Sally, Irene and Mary (1938) – Miss Barkow
- Kentucky Moonshine (1938) – 'Sugar' Hatfield
- Rascals (1938) – Patient (uncredited)
- Always Goodbye (1938) – Al's Bride-to-Be (uncredited)
- Young Fugitives (1938) – Kathy
- I'll Give a Million (1938) – Nanette (uncredited)
- Strange Faces (1938) – Lorry May
- Pride of the Navy (1939) – Minor Role (uncredited)
- Three Smart Girls Grow Up (1939) – Secretary (uncredited)
- For Love or Money (1939) – Amy, The Maid
- When Tomorrow Comes (1939) – Waitress (uncredited)
- Babes in Arms (1939) – Receptionist (uncredited)
- Dad for a Day (1939, Short) – Employment Agency Receptionist (uncredited)
- First Love (1939) – Agnes, Barbara's Maid
- Danger on Wheels (1940) – Esme
- Double Alibi (1940) – Hospital Switchboard Operator
- Girl in 313 (1940) – Jenny, Hotel Maid
- Queen of the Mob (1940) – Billy's Nurse
- Black Diamonds (1940) – Nina Norton
- Dulcy (1940) – Miss Twill (uncredited)
- Kitty Foyle (1940) – Pat Day
- Tall, Dark and Handsome (1941) – Martha, Sales Girl
- The Flame of New Orleans (1941) – Party Guest (uncredited)
- Father Takes a Wife (1941) – Secretary
- You Belong to Me (1941) – Doris
- Pacific Blackout (1941) – Irene
- Roxie Hart (1942) – Secretary (uncredited)
- The Night Before the Divorce (1942) – Olga – the Maid
- True to the Army (1942) – Mae
- Ship Ahoy (1942) – Nurse (uncredited)
- The Great Man's Lady (1942) – Persis
- They All Kissed the Bride (1942) – Susie Johnson
- Between Us Girls (1942) – Mary Belle
- Stand By All Networks (1942) – Nora Cassidy
- My Heart Belongs to Daddy (1942) – Dawn (uncredited)
- Lady Bodyguard (1943) – Miss Tracy
- The Powers Girl (1943) – Nancy
- Flight for Freedom (1943) – Newspaper Woman (uncredited)
- They Got Me Covered (1943) – Helen
- Hit Parade of 1943 (1943) – Janie
- So Proudly We Hail! (1943) – Lt. Sadie Schwartz
- Thank Your Lucky Stars (1943) – Fan (uncredited)
- Mystery Broadcast (1943) – Smitty
- Hands Across the Border (1944) – Sophie Lawrence
- The Navy Way (1944) – Agnes
- Swing in the Saddle (1944) – Addie LaTour
- I Love a Soldier (1944) – Cecilia 'Cissy' Grant
- Casanova Brown (1944) – Monica Case
- Tahiti Nights (1944) – Mata
- High Powered (1945) – Cassie McQuade
- Don Juan Quilligan (1945) – Lucy Blake
- Blonde from Brooklyn (1945) – Diane Peabody
- She Wouldn't Say Yes (1945) – Train Passenger at Bar
- A Guy Could Change (1946) – Grace Conley
- From This Day Forward (1946) – Alice Beesley
- Strange Impersonation (1946) – Talkative Nurse
- Swing Parade of 1946 (1946) – Marie Finch
- One Exciting Week (1946) – Mabel Taylor
- It's a Wonderful Life (1946) – Cousin Tilly
- A Likely Story (1947) – Nurse (uncredited)
- Merton of the Movies (1947) – Gladys (uncredited)
- Shed No Tears (1948) – Hilda – the Maid (uncredited)
- Texas, Brooklyn & Heaven (1948) – Wife (uncredited)
- The Snake Pit (1948) – Nurse Jones (uncredited)
- Let's Live a Little (1948) – Miss Adams
- And Baby Makes Three (1949) – Mrs. Bennett (uncredited)
- Young Daniel Boone (1950) – Helen Bryan
- The Fuller Brush Girl (1950) – Woman Selling Magazine (uncredited)
- The Stooge (1951) – Ms. Regan (uncredited)
- Room for One More (1952) – Grace Roberts
- Sailor Beware (1952) – Ginger
- Dreamboat (1953) – Wife in Bar (uncredited)
- Let's Do It Again (1953) – Nelly – the Maid
- Clipped Wings (1953) – Mildred
- The Eternal Sea (1955) – Admitting Nurse (uncredited)
- When Gangland Strikes (1956) – Emily Parsons
- The Birds and the Bees (1956) – Mrs. Burnside
- Calling Homicide (1956) – Flo Burton – Script Girl (uncredited)
- Bundle of Joy (1956) – Matron
- The Go-Getter (1956) – Miss Wellington, aptitude tester
- Public Pigeon No. 1 (1957) – Mrs. Bates (uncredited)
- Hold That Hypnotist (1957) – Hotel Maid (uncredited)
- Gun Duel in Durango (1957) – Spinster
- The Last Stagecoach West (1957) – Miss Feeney, Bryceson's Secretary (uncredited)
- The Joker Is Wild (1957) – Heckler (uncredited)
- The Sad Sack (1957) – Sgt. Hansen
- Rock-A-Bye Baby (1958) – Nurse
- I Married a Monster from Outer Space (1958) – Mother Bradley (uncredited)
- Don't Give Up the Ship (1959) – Mother at Wedding Party (uncredited)
- Career (1959) – Marie, Secretary to Shirley Drake
- All in a Night's Work (1961) – Miss Schuster
- Ada (1961) – Clubwoman with Pecan Pie (uncredited)
- Bachelor in Paradise (1961) – Mrs. Bruce Freedman (uncredited)
- The Errand Boy (1961) – Commissary Cashier
- Girls! Girls! Girls! (1962) – Mrs. Figgot – Hat Customer (uncredited)
- Fun in Acapulco (1963) – Mrs Stevers (uncredited)
- Who's Minding the Store? (1963) – Mattress Customer
- Paradise, Hawaiian Style (1966) – Mrs. Belden
- The Strongest Man in the World (1975) – Mercedes
- Goodbye, Franklin High (1978) – Teacher

=== Television ===
- The Life of Riley as Millie in "Assistant Manager" (1949) starring Jackie Gleason as Riley
- The Gene Autry Show (2 episodes, 1952)
- Willy (series regular, 1954–1955) as Emily Dodger
- Crossroads in "Broadway Trust" (1955)
- The George Burns and Gracie Allen Show as Mrs. Curtis in "George's Mother-in-Law Trouble" (1955)
- Four Star Playhouse as Madeline in "A Kiss for Mr. Lincoln" (1955)
- It's a Great Life as Thelma Purcell in "A Job for Kathy" (1955)
- Climax! in "The Day They Gave the Babies Away" (1955)
- Hey, Jeannie! as Katie in "Jeannie the Policewoman" (1957)
- The Jack Benny Program (1957, 1962, 2 episodes)
- The Donna Reed Show (1958–1965, 3 episodes)
- Bourbon Street Beat as Clairibelle in "Mrs. Viner Vanishes" (1959)
- M Squad as Mary Cosgrove in "Voluntary Surrender" (1959) starring Lee Marvin
- Dennis the Menace (1960, season 2 episode 6)
- The Ann Sothern Show (1959–1960, 2 episodes)
- The DuPont Show with June Allyson as Hazel in "The Doctor and the Redhead" (1960)
- The Loretta Young Show as Aunt Gladys in "Off-Duty Affair" (1960)
- The Andy Griffith Show (1960–1962, 3 episodes)
- Pete and Gladys (1961–1962, 2 episodes) with Harry Morgan and Cara Williams
- Bonanza (1961–1962, 2 episodes)
- Ichabod and Me in "The Old Stowe Road" and "Women's Rights" (1962)
- The Joey Bishop Show (1962–1965)
- Perry Mason as Bess in "The Case of the Baffling Bug" (1965)
- Please Don't Eat the Daisies as Mabel in "Help Wanted, Desperately" (1967)
- The Brady Bunch as Kay in "Goodbye, Alice, Hello" (1972)
- Here's Lucy as Mary Winters in "Lucy Fights the System" (1974)
- Laverne and Shirley as Nana Shotz in "The Society Party" (1976)
- The Love Boat as Sister #2 in "Dear Beverly; Strike; Special Delivery" (1977)
- The Dukes of Hazzard as Aunt Clara Coltrane in "Sadie Hogg Day" (1981)
