= Thanks for Everything (1938 film) =

1938 comedy film by William A. Seiter

- Theatrical release poster
- Directed by: William A. Seiter
- Screenplay by: Curtis Kenyon; Harry Tugend
- Story by: Gilbert Wright
- Produced by: Harry Joe Brown
- Starring: Adolphe Menjou; Jack Oakie; Jack Haley; Arleen Whelan; Tony Martin; Binnie Barnes
- Cinematography: Lucien N. Andriot
- Edited by: Robert L. Simpson
- Production company: 20th Century-Fox
- Distributed by: 20th Century-Fox
- Release date: December 23, 1938
- Running time: 70 minutes
- Country: United States
- Language: English

Thanks for Everything is a 1938 American comedy film directed by William A. Seiter, written by Curtis Kenyon and Harry Tugend, and starring Adolphe Menjou, Jack Oakie, Jack Haley, Arleen Whelan, Tony Martin and Binnie Barnes. It was released on December 23, 1938, by 20th Century-Fox.

== Plot ==
J. B. Harcourt, the head of a market research firm, uses a radio contest to seek out the average American. The winner is the ordinary Henry Smith, whose answers to questions reveal the general view of mainstream America. Harcourt and his assistant Bates attempt to mine this useful source of information for profit.

== Cast ==
- Adolphe Menjou as J. B. Harcourt
- Jack Oakie as Bates
- Jack Haley as Henry Smith
- Arleen Whelan as Madge Raines
- Tony Martin as Tommy Davis
- Binnie Barnes as Kay Swift
- George Barbier as Joe Raines
- Warren Hymer as Marine Sergeant
- Gregory Gaye as Ambassador
- Andrew Tombes as Mayor
- Renie Riano as Mrs. Sweeney
- Jan Duggan as Miss Twitchell
- Charles Lane as Dr. Olson
- Charles Trowbridge as Draft Doctor
- Frank Sully as Lem Slininger
- Gary Breckner as Announcer
- Paul Hurst as Guard
- James Flavin as Policeman
- Edgar Dearing as Policeman Mike
- Carol Adams As Bathing Beauty (uncredited)
- Elvia Allman As Violinist (uncredited)
- John Dilson As Mr. Lish (uncredited)
- Bess Flowers As Radio Listener with Family (uncredited)
- Fred Kelsey As Police Desk Sergeant (uncredited)
- Ruth Peterson As Secretary (uncredited)
- Arthur Rankin As Sound Effects Man (uncredited)
