= George Hively =

American screenwriter

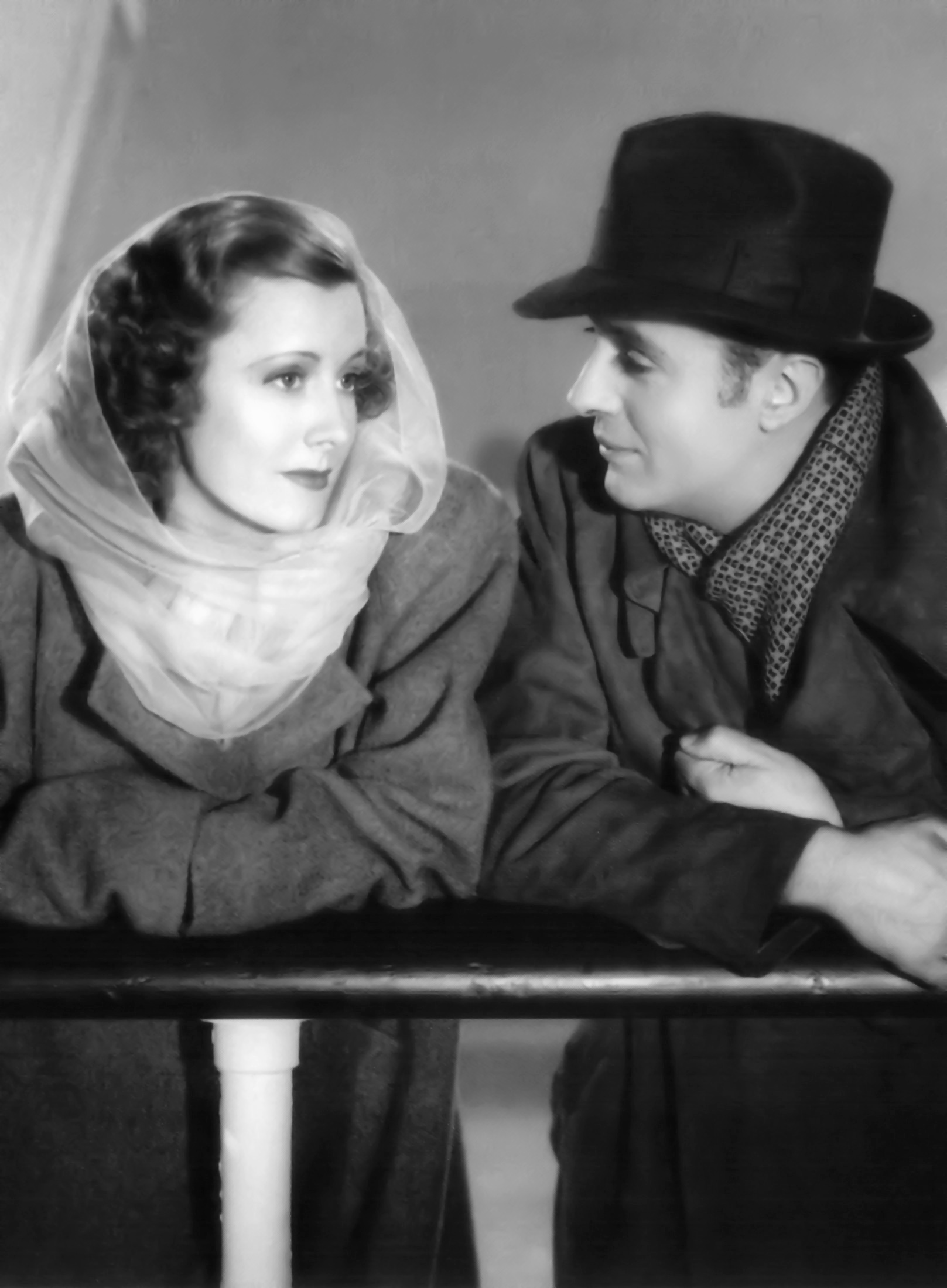
- Born: September 6, 1889; Springfield, Missouri, US
- Died: March 2, 1950 (aged 60); Los Angeles, California, US
- Occupation: Screenwriter
- Years active: 1917–1945
- Children: 2, including Jack

George Hively (September 6, 1889 – March 2, 1950) was a film writer and film editor from 1917 to 1945.

Hively was born in Springfield, Missouri and died in Los Angeles, California. He is the father of George Hively and Jack Hively, both editors in film and television.

He was nominated for an Academy Award for Best Film Editing on the 1935 film The Informer.

== Selected filmography ==
- Straight Shooting (1917)
- The Secret Man (1917)
- The Scarlet Drop (1918)
- Go Straight (1921)
- Luring Lips (1921)
- Where is This West? (1923)
- The Valley of Hate (1924)
- Folly of Youth (1925)
- A Man of Nerve (1925)
- Altars of Desire (1927)
- China Bound (1929)
- Our Blushing Brides (1930)
- Dance, Fools, Dance (1931)
- Laughing Sinners (1931)
- West of Broadway (1931)
- Polly of the Circus (1932)
- As You Desire Me (1932)
- Blondie of the Follies (1932)
- Rockabye (1932)
- The Life of Vergie Winters (1934)
- The Age of Innocence (1934)
- The Informer (1935)
- The Three Musketeers (1935)
- Another Face (1935)
- The Last Outlaw (1936)
- The Plough and the Stars (1936)
- The Toast of New York (1937)
- Breakfast for Two (1937)
- Bringing Up Baby (1938)
- Mother Carey's Chickens (1938)
- The Mad Miss Manton (1938)
- Love Affair (1939)
- Laddie (1940)
- Abe Lincoln in Illinois (1940)
- Anne of Windy Poplars (1940)
- Little Men (1940)
- The Saint in Palm Springs (1941)
- Father Takes a Wife (1941)
- Above Suspicion (1943)
- Song of Russia (1944)
- 3 Men in White (1944)
- Lost in a Harem (1944)
