= San Antone (film) =

1953 film

- Theatrical release poster
- Directed by: Joseph Kane
- Screenplay by: Steve Fisher
- Based on: The Golden Herd; 1950 novel by Curt Carroll
- Produced by: Joseph Kane
- Starring: Rod Cameron; Arleen Whelan; Forrest Tucker; Katy Jurado
- Cinematography: Bud Thackery
- Edited by: Tony Martinelli
- Music by: R. Dale Butts
- Color process: Black and white
- Production company: Republic Pictures
- Distributed by: Republic Pictures
- Release date: February 15, 1953
- Running time: 90 minutes
- Country: United States
- Language: English

San Antone is a 1953 American Western film directed by Joseph Kane and starring Rod Cameron, Arleen Whelan, Forrest Tucker, Katy Jurado. It was produced and distributed by Republic Pictures.

== Plot ==
Confederate army officer Brian Culver comes to propose marriage to Julia Allerby, but she is distracted by Chino Figueroa's plans to leave her ranch. She tries to persuade Chino to keep working for her, first by seducing him, which fails, then by false accusations that he attacked her.

Culver is angry enough when civilian Carl Miller turns up with a troop movement that he, Miller, will lead. Carl is a friend of Chino's and in love with Chino's sister, Mistania. As usual, Julia intervenes and attempts to use her wiles on Carl, then becomes furious when he slaps her face.

Riding through a canyon where he expects Culver's soldiers to be attacked, Carl and the soldiers are deserted by Culver and end up captured. By the time Carl is released and returns to San Antonio, Chino has taken some of Culver's men hostage while others have taken jobs with wealthy rancher John Chisum.

Carl discovers that Culver murdered his father. A desperate Julia and Culver are trying to get across the border. Carl ultimately decides to let them go, believing they deserve each other.

== Cast ==
- Rod Cameron as Carl Miller
- Arleen Whelan as Julia Allerby
- Forrest Tucker as Lt. Brian Culver
- Katy Jurado as Mistania Figueroa
- Rodolfo Acosta as Chino Figueroa
- Roy Roberts as John Chisum
- Bob Steele as Bob Coolidge
- Harry Carey, Jr. as Dobe Frakus
- James O'Hara as Jim Dane
- Andy Brennan as Ike
- Richard Hale as Abraham Lincoln
- Argentina Brunetti as Mexican Woman
- Douglas Kennedy as Captain Garfield
- Paul Fierro as Bandit Leader
- George Cleveland as Colonel Allerby
