= Appointment in Tokyo =

1945 film by Jack Hively

- Directed by: Jack Hively
- Screenplay by: Capt. Jack Handley; Capt. Jesse Lasky Jr.
- Produced by: Office of War Information
- Music by: Sol Kaplan
- Distributed by: Warner Bros. Pictures
- Release date: 1945
- Running time: 56 minutes
- Country: United States
- Language: English

The full film

Appointment in Tokyo is a 1945 documentary produced by the Army Pictorial Service, Signal Corps, with the cooperation of the Army Air Forces and the United States Navy, and released by Warner Bros. Pictures for the War Activities Committee shortly after the surrender of Japan. It mainly follows General Douglas MacArthur and his men from their exile from the Philippines in early 1942, through the signing of the instrument of surrender on USS Missouri on September 1, 1945.

The film is notable for its discussion of the problems MacArthur faced in Australia after the conquest of the Philippines, the American military's "hit 'em where they ain't" strategy through the Solomons and Papua New Guinea, and especially the footage from the reconquest of the Philippines, including of Battle of Leyte, the Battle of Manila, and the rescue of American and Filipino POWs from Japanese prison camps.

The New York Times reviewer Bosley Crowther felt that the action footage is of the "highest caliber," and the battle in Manila's streets is recounted in shots that are as vivid as any others in war photography. But Crowther continued that "to be quite frank about it, the cinematic structure of this film is inadequate to the vital subject and far inferior to that of previous war reports. Nor should the film, be regarded as a full review of the Pacific war." He objected that this material is "strangely grandiose with a 'melodramatic flavor.'" "Questionable, too," he went on, "from the point of straight reporting," is the "elaborate emphasis placed upon the personality of Gen. Douglas MacArthur," represented in no less than twenty-six shots.

Appointment in Tokyo was preserved by the Academy Film Archive in 2013.
