= Tall, Dark and Handsome (film) =

1941 film by H. Bruce Humberstone

- Theatrical release poster
- Directed by: H. Bruce Humberstone
- Written by: Karl Tunberg; Darrell Ware
- Produced by: Fred Kohlmar; Darryl F. Zanuck
- Starring: Cesar Romero; Virginia Gilmore; Charlotte Greenwood
- Cinematography: Ernest Palmer
- Edited by: Allen McNeil
- Music by: Cyril J. Mockridge; Emil Newman
- Production company: 20th Century Fox
- Distributed by: 20th Century Fox
- Release date: January 24, 1941
- Running time: 78 minutes
- Country: United States
- Language: English

Tall, Dark and Handsome is a 1941 American comedy crime film directed by H. Bruce Humberstone and starring Cesar Romero, Virginia Gilmore, and Charlotte Greenwood. It was produced and released by Twentieth Century Fox.

== Plot ==
In Chicago, a Robin Hood-like crook is an object of affection, nice to some and not so nice to others.

Chicago mobster boss Shep Morrison (Cesar Romero), who has a reputation as a brutal killer, falls for department store employee Judy Miller (Virginia Gilmore) on Christmas Eve. Learning that Miller's job is to babysit children for shoppers, the unmarried Morrison presents himself to her as a widowed father in the banking industry, and hires her to help with his children. Morrison quickly dispatches his henchman Frosty Welch (Milton Berle) to find children to pose as his. Welch returns with only one child, Detroit Harry Jr. (Stanley Clements). As Miller helps Morrison decorate his Christmas tree, he mentions that his other child is with grandma for the holidays.

Thugs Puffy (Frank Jenks) and Louie (Marc Lawrence) interrupt the happy scene, upon orders from rival crime boss Pretty Willie (Sheldon Leonard) to kill Morrison. Rather than kill them, Morrison and Welch lock them in the basement. Pretty Willie arrives the next day and is convinced Morrison has killed Puffy and Louie. The two mob bosses reach a gangland cease fire agreement to conduct their criminal activities in different areas.

By now, Miller realizes who Morrison really is, but he smooths thing over by getting Miller a job as a vocalist in the nightclub, and by agreeing to watch over Harry Jr. She realizes she has fallen in love with him in spite of his criminal activities, and accepts his marriage proposal. It is soon revealed that Morrison has never killed anyone, when the thugs escape from the basement. Morrison makes newspaper headlines when word leaks out that he's a mob boss who has never murdered his rivals.

== Cast ==
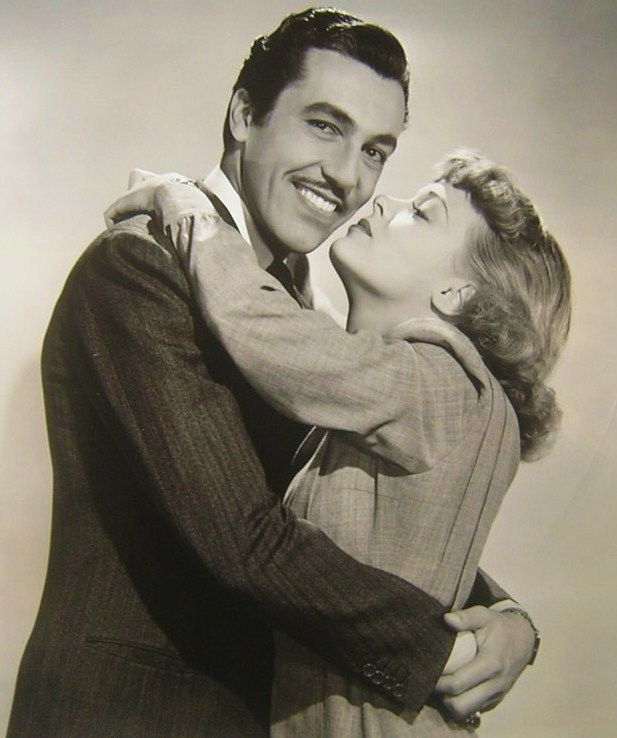
Cesar Romero and Virginia Gilmore.

- Cesar Romero as J.J. 'Shep' Morrison
- Virginia Gilmore as Judy Miller
- Charlotte Greenwood as Winnie Sage
- Milton Berle as Frosty Welch
- Sheldon Leonard as 'Pretty' Willie Williams
- Stanley Clements as Detroit Harry Morrison Jr.
- Frank Jenks as Puffy
- Barnett Parker as Quentin, the Butler
- Marc Lawrence as Louie
- Paul Hurst as Biff Sage
- Frank Bruno as Chick - Driver / Gunman
- Anthony Caruso as Gunman
- Marion Martin as Dawn
- Leon Belasco as Alfredo Herrera
- Charles D. Brown as District Attorney
- Addison Richards as Commandant of Military Academy
- George Watts as Joe Brady, Cigar Stand Proprietor
- Stanley Blystone as Policeman in Cigar Store
- Mary Treen as Martha, Sales Girl
- Vickie Lester as Snuggy, Sales Girl
- George Melford as Governor John Logan
- Harry Semels as Charlie, Party Guest
- Alphonse Martell as Henri, Doorman, Gold Coast Bar
- Nestor Paiva as Gold Coast Headwaiter
- James Flavin as Detective in Cigar Store
- Chester Clute as Floorwalker
- Bud Jamison as Bartender
- Cecil Cunningham as Frosty's Landlady
- Charles R. Moore as Train Porter
- Lillian Porter as Hat Check Girl
- Bonnie Bannon as Chorus Girl
- Dorothy Dearing as Chorus Girl

== Awards ==
The film was nominated for the Best Original Screenplay at the 14th Academy Awards.

== See also ==
- Tall, dark and handsome

== Bibliography ==
- Fetrow, Alan G. Feature Films, 1940-1949: a United States Filmography. McFarland, 1994.
