= Arleen Whelan =

American actress (1916–1993)

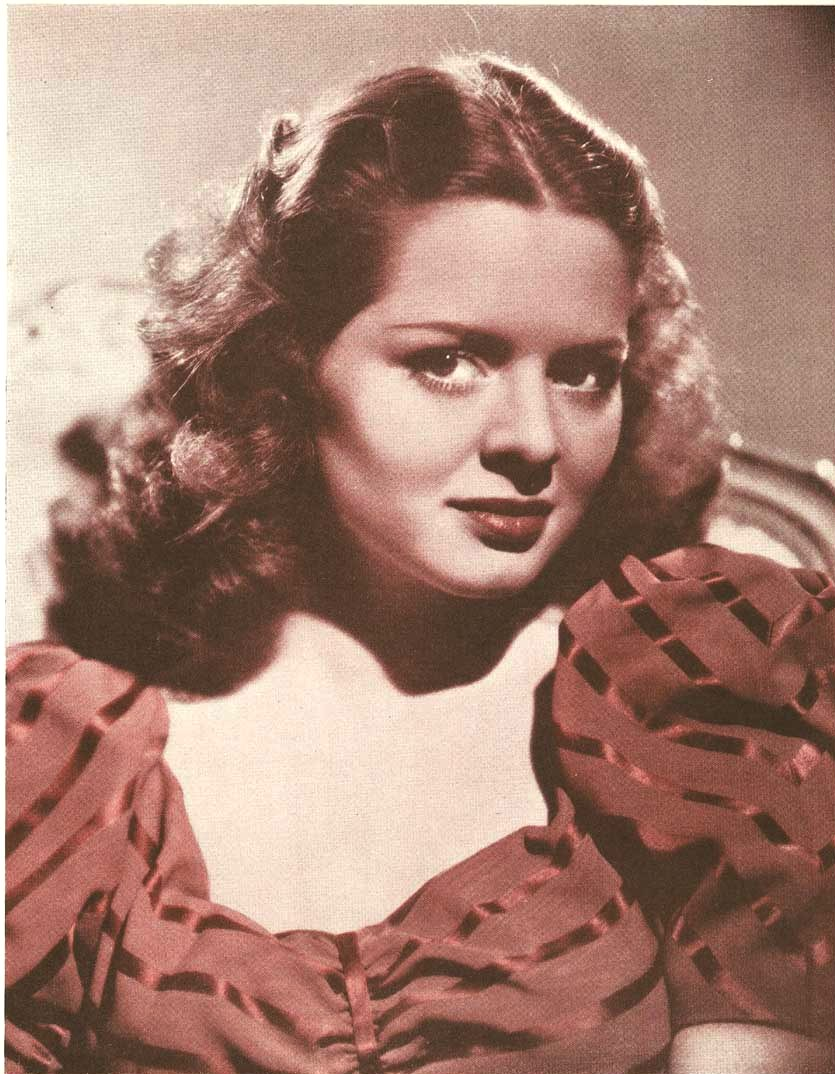
- Whelan in 1938
- Born: September 1, 1916; Salt Lake City, Utah, U.S.
- Died: April 7, 1993 (aged 76); Orange County, California, U.S.
- Occupation: Actress
- Years active: 1937–1957
- Spouses: Alexander D'Arcy (m. 1940; div. 1943) Hugh Owen (m. 1942; div. 1953) Dr. Warren O. Cagney (m. 1960; div. 1961)

Arleen Whelan (September 1, 1916 – April 7, 1993) was an American film actress.

== Early years ==
Whelan was a native of Salt Lake City, Utah. Before she became an actress, she worked in Southern California as a manicurist, contributing her earnings to help with her family's expenses.

== Career ==
Whelan appeared in 25 films between 1937 and 1957, reportedly after 20th Century Fox director H. Bruce Humberstone saw Whelan working as a manicurist in a barbershop. After her screen test, the studio cast Whelan as the female lead in a film version of Robert Louis Stevenson's Kidnapped (1938).

Whelan's Broadway credits include Oh, Brother! (1945) and The Doughgirls (1942).

== Personal life ==
Whelan wed actor Alexander D'Arcy in September 1940, and they were divorced in 1943. On October 1, 1942, she married Hugh Owen (a film distributor). They separated on July 8, 1952, and she filed for divorce in 1953. Her third marriage, to Warren O. Cagney, also ended in divorce.

On April 8, 1993, Whelan died in Orange, California, following a stroke.

== Filmography ==
Year	Title	Role	Notes
1937	On Again-Off Again	Minor Role	Uncredited
1938	Kidnapped	Jean MacDonald	
1938	Gateway	Catherine O'Shea	
1938	Thanks for Everything	Madge Raines	
1939	Boy Friend	Sue Duffy	
1939	Young Mr. Lincoln	Sarah Clay	
1939	Sabotage	Gail	
1940	Young People	Judith	
1940	Charter Pilot	Raquel Andrews	
1941	Charley's Aunt	Kitty Verdun	
1942	Castle in the Desert	Brenda Hartford	
1942	Sundown Jim	Catherine Barr	
1943	Stage Door Canteen	Herself	
1947	Suddenly, It's Spring	Gloria Fay	
1947	Ramrod	Rose Leland	
1947	Variety Girl	Variety Girl	Uncredited
1947	The Senator Was Indiscreet	Valerie Shepherd	
1948	That Wonderful Urge	Jessica Woods	
1949	Dear Wife	Tommy Murphy	
1951	Passage West	Rose Billings	
1952	Flaming Feather	Carolina	
1953	Never Wave at a WAC	Sgt. Toni Wayne	
1953	San Antone	Julia Allerby	
1953	The Sun Shines Bright	Lucy Lee Lake	
1956	The Women of Pitcairn Island	Hutia	
1957	The Badge of Marshal Brennan	Murdock	
1957	Raiders of Old California	Julie Johnson	
