= Father Takes a Wife =

1941 film by Jack Hively

- Directed by: Jack Hively
- Screenplay by: Dorothy Fields; Herbert Fields
- Produced by: Lee Marcus
- Starring: Adolphe Menjou; Gloria Swanson; John Howard
- Cinematography: Robert De Grasse
- Edited by: George Hively
- Music by: Roy Webb; Gene Rose
- Production company: RKO Radio Pictures
- Distributed by: RKO Radio Pictures
- Release date: October 3, 1941 (U.S.)
- Running time: 79 minutes
- Country: United States
- Language: English

Father Takes a Wife is a 1941 American comedy film directed by Jack Hively and starring Gloria Swanson, Adolphe Menjou and John Howard. Silent screen queen Gloria Swanson returned to films after a seven-year absence. Eight years later, Swanson staged another comeback in the classic Sunset Boulevard (1950).

== Synopsis ==
Senior (Adolphe Menjou) is a middle-aged widowed shipping magnate, who falls in love with celebrated actress Leslie Collier (Gloria Swanson) and marries her after a whirlwind courtship.

== Cast ==
- Adolphe Menjou as Fredrick Osborne, Sr.
- Gloria Swanson as Leslie Collier
- John Howard as Fredrick Osborne, Jr.
- Desi Arnaz as Carlos Bardez
- Helen Broderick as Aunt Julie
- Florence Rice as Enid Osborne
- Neil Hamilton as Vincent Stewart
- Grady Sutton as Tailor
- George Meader as Henderson
- Mary Treen as Secretary
- Ruth Dietrich as Miss Patterson
- Jack Briggs as Joe, Senior's Driver (uncredited)

== Reception ==
The film lost $104,000 at the box office.

== Bibliography ==
- Booker, Keith M. Historical Dictionary of American Cinema. Rowman & Littlefield, 2021.

== External list ==
- Father Takes a Wife at IMDb
- Father Takes a Wife at the TCM Movie Database (archived)
- Father Takes a Wife at the AFI Catalog of Feature Films
