= Gateway (film) =

1938 film by Alfred L. Werker

- Theatrical release poster
- Directed by: Alfred Werker
- Screenplay by: Lamar Trotti
- Story by: Walter Reisch
- Produced by: Darryl F. Zanuck
- Starring: Don Ameche; Arleen Whelan; Gregory Ratoff; Binnie Barnes; Gilbert Roland; Raymond Walburn; John Carradine
- Cinematography: Edward Cronjager
- Edited by: James B. Morley
- Music by: Arthur Lange
- Production company: 20th Century Fox
- Distributed by: 20th Century Fox
- Release date: August 5, 1938
- Running time: 75 minutes
- Country: United States
- Language: English

Gateway is a 1938 American drama film directed by Alfred L. Werker and written by Lamar Trotti. The film stars Don Ameche, Arleen Whelan, Gregory Ratoff, Binnie Barnes, Gilbert Roland, Raymond Walburn and John Carradine. The film was released on August 5, 1938, by 20th Century Fox.

== Cast ==
- Don Ameche as Dick Court
- Arleen Whelan as Catherine O'Shea
- Gregory Ratoff as Prince Michael Boris Alexis
- Binnie Barnes as Mrs. Fay Sims
- Gilbert Roland as Tony Cadona
- Raymond Walburn as Mr. Benjamin McNutt
- John Carradine as Leader of Refugees
- Maurice Moscovitch as Grandpa Hlawek
- Harry Carey as U.S. Immigration Commissioner Nelson
- Lyle Talbot as Henry Porter
- Marjorie Gateson as Mrs. Arabella McNutt
- Fritz Leiber as Dr. Weilander
- Warren Hymer as Guard-Waiter
- Eddie Conrad as Davonsky
- E. E. Clive as Room Steward
- Russell Hicks as Ernest Porter
- C. Montague Shaw as Captain
- Charles Coleman as Ship's Purser
- Gerald Oliver Smith as an Englishman
- Albert Conti as a Count
- Joseph Crehan as a U.S. Immigrant Inspector
- Addison Richards as a U.S. Immigrant Inspector
