= Street of Chance (1942 film) =

1942 film by Jack Hively

- Theatrical release poster
- Directed by: Jack Hively
- Screenplay by: Garrett Fort
- Based on: Cornell Woolrich (based on a story)
- Produced by: Sol C. Siegel
- Starring: Burgess Meredith; Claire Trevor
- Cinematography: Theodor Sparkuhl
- Edited by: Arthur P. Schmidt
- Music by: David Buttolph
- Color process: Black and white
- Production company: Paramount Pictures
- Distributed by: Paramount Pictures
- Release date: October 3, 1942
- Running time: 74 minutes
- Country: United States
- Language: English

Street of Chance is a 1942 American film noir mystery film directed by Jack Hively and starring Burgess Meredith as a man who finds he has been suffering from amnesia and Claire Trevor as a woman who protects him from the police, who suspect him of murder. He is suspected of the murder of the wealthy Harry Diedrich. The only eyewitness to the murder was Harry's mute grandmother, and she can only communicate with others through sign language.

The story was based on Cornell Woolrich's novel The Black Curtain. It was later dramatized three times on the CBS Radio series Suspense.

== Plot ==
Frank Thompson awakens in the middle of the street after wreckage falling from a building in New York City narrowly misses hitting him on the head. Frank soon discovers that his apartment has been rented out for a year and his wife Virginia has been living on her own elsewhere.

Frank confronts Virginia, who is shocked to see the husband who, a year earlier, disappeared without explanation. As Frank slowly pieces together his old life, it turns out he is known by another name and is running from a murder he cannot remember committing. Detective Joe Marucci is shadowing his every move.

Looking for answers in the neighborhood where he awoke on the street, Frank meets Ruth Dillon who knows him only as "Danny". Ruth takes Frank/Danny to the mansion of the wealthy Diedrich family, where she has been employed as a servant. Family matriarch Grandma Diedrich was an eyewitness to the murder of son Harry (this is the murder of which Frank/Danny is suspected) but she is a housebound invalid who also is mute. Through sign language, Frank/Danny learns from her that Ruth is the killer - Harry had caught her stealing. Frank/Danny's life is in danger and a confrontation and a deadly struggle ensues. Marucci arrives to tie up loose ends.

== Cast ==
- Burgess Meredith as Frank Thompson
- Claire Trevor as Ruth Dillon
- Louise Platt as Virginia Thompson
- Sheldon Leonard as Joe Marucci
- Frieda Inescort as Alma Diedrich
- Jerome Cowan as Bill Diedrich
- Adeline De Walt Reynolds as Grandma Diedrich
- Arthur Loft as Sheriff Lew Stebbins
- Clancy Cooper as Burke
- Paul Phillips as Schoeder
- Keith Richards as Interne
- Ann Doran as Miss Peabody
- Cliff Clark as Ryan, (Policeman)
- Edwin Maxwell as Stillwell, D.A.

== Reception ==
Film critic Dennis Schwartz liked the film and wrote, "Jack Hively efficiently directs an early film noir that establishes a number of conventions that helped define noir ... Though the murderer was too obvious by the halfway point, the film still had many disturbing moments that kept me interested."
