= Petticoat Larceny =

1943 film directed by Ben Holmes

- Directed by: Ben Holmes; William Dorfman (assistant)
- Screenplay by: Jack Townley; Stuart Palmer
- Produced by: Bert Gilroy
- Starring: Ruth Warrick; Joan Carroll; Walter Reed
- Cinematography: Frank Redman
- Edited by: Harry Marker
- Music by: C. Bakaleinikoff; Roy Webb
- Production company: RKO Radio Pictures
- Release date: July 17, 1943 (US)
- Running time: 61 minutes
- Country: United States
- Language: English

Petticoat Larceny is a 1943 American comedy film directed by Ben Holmes from an original screenplay by Jack Townley and Stuart Palmer. The film stars Ruth Warrick, Joan Carroll, and Walter Reed, and was released by RKO Radio Pictures (who also produced the film) on July 7, 1943.

== Plot ==
Radio child star Joan Mitchell appears on a popular crime series called "Undercover Angel," but she's fed up with what she believes are the corny scripts, complaining that real children don't speak like that. She decides to "research" her role by investigating actual criminals. She's discovered snooping in their home by a trio of goofy, small time crooks, who, believing she's an orphan, take her in and agree to teach her some tricks of the trade. Meanwhile, her sudden disappearance has everyone naturally assuming she's been kidnapped, and things take a turn for the worse when she's recognized and snatched for real—so her new guardians take it upon themselves to rescue her.

== Cast ==
- Ruth Warrick as Pat Mitchell
- Joan Carroll as Joan Mitchell/Small Change
- Walter Reed as Bill Morgan
- Wally Brown as Sam Colfax
- Tom Kennedy as Pinky
- Jimmy Conlin as Jitters
- Vince Barnett as Stogie
- Paul Guilfoyle as Joe 'Tinhorn' Foster
- Grant Withers as Detective Hogan
- Earl S. Dewey as Mr. J. C. Crandall
- Charles Coleman as Higgins the Butler
- Cliff Clark as Lieutenant Hackett
