= Jack Hively =

American actor

- Hively with actress Gloria Swanson on the set of the 1941 film, Father Takes a Wife
- Born: September 5, 1910; Denver, Colorado, United States
- Died: December 19, 1995 (aged 85); Hollywood, California, United States
- Occupation(s): Film director, editor
- Years active: 1934–1991
- Father: George Hively

Jack Hively (September 5, 1910 – December 19, 1995) was an American film editor and film and television director whose career lasted from the 1930s through the 1980s. His father and his brother were also film editors. He began as a film editor, before moving on to direct features. His career was interrupted by his enlistment in the U.S. Army following the Japanese bombing of Pearl Harbor in December 1941. After the war he returned to directing films, before moving on to directing on television.

== Life and career ==
Hively was part of a theatrical family, his father, George Hively, was an Academy Award-nominated editor (for the 1935 film, The Informer), and his brother, George Hively Jr., was a film and television editor. His mother was Georgenia Margaret Hively (née Steele).

Hively began his career in the film industry as an editor at RKO in 1933, working as an assistant editor on the Richard Dix film, No Marriage Ties. By the following year he was an editor, working on such films as Success at Any Price and Where Sinners Meet. Other notable films which Hively edited include: Annie Oakley (1935), starring Barbara Stanwyck; the 1936 comedy Smartest Girl in Town, starring Gene Raymond and Ann Sothern; The Man Who Found Himself (1937), which marked the starring debut for Joan Fontaine; Garson Kanin's 1938 comedy, Next Time I Marry, starring Lucille Ball, James Ellison, and Lee Bowman; and the second installment of The Saint franchise, 1939's The Saint Strikes Back, which marked the first time George Sanders appeared in the role. After his work on The Saint, Hively would be given the opportunity to direct his own films, beginning with 1939's They Made Her a Spy.

By 1940, he was considered by some to be one of the best directors in Hollywood. Between 1939 and the outbreak of World War II, Hively directed 14 features. Having edited the second film in The Saint franchise, Hively directed the next three as well, The Saint Takes Over and The Saint's Double Trouble in 1940, and in 1941 he directed the first feature film ever to be filmed in Palm Springs, California, The Saint in Palm Springs Other notable films which Hively directed during this time include: a sequel to Anne of Green Gables, Anne of Windy Poplars, starring Anne Shirley; the 1941 comedy starring Gloria Swanson and Adolphe Menjou, Father Takes a Wife; and the 1942 film noir, Street of Chance, starring Burgess Meredith and Claire Trevor.

In 1941, Hively began dating Dorothy Lovett. The two had planned to marry on Christmas Day 1941, but Hively's enlistment in the Army Signal Corps caused those plans to be delayed. While training for the Army Signal Corps at Wright Field in Dayton, Ohio, Hively married actress Dorothy Lovett on March 17, 1942, St. Patrick's Day. Hively joined the Army Signal Corps in late 1941, and remained in the service for the duration of World War II, rising to the rank of Major. He served under General MacArthur in the Pacific Theater, along with screenwriter Jesse Lasky Jr. Prior to joining MacArthur's group in the Pacific, Hively was used to direct training films. While shooting one of those training films in Alaska, How to Operate in Cold Weather, Hively suffered what some accounts called "a very bad case of frostbite." After his discharge, Hively returned to the film industry, this time working for Universal Pictures, mostly as a second unit director.

By the end of the 1940s, Hively had left the film industry, and turned his attention to television. He worked sparingly during the 1950s, before becoming active once again in the 1960s and 1970s. He worked regularly on several television series, including Death Valley Days, Lassie, and The Life and Times of Grizzly Adams, as well as directing several TV movies. His final directorial credit was a television film entitled California Gold Rush.

Hively died on December 19, 1995, in Hollywood, California, and was buried in Forest Lawn Memorial Park in Glendale, California.

== Filmography ==
(as per AFI's database)

Year	Film	Position	Notes
1933	Ace of Aces	Assistant editor	
1933	No Marriage Ties	Assistant editor	
1934	Success at Any Price	Editor	
1934	Man of Two Worlds	Editor	
1934	Where Sinners Meet	Editor	
1935	Annie Oakley	Editor	
1935	Romance in Manhattan	Editor	
1935	His Family Tree	Editor	
1935	The Arizonian	Editor	
1935	Strangers All	Editor	
1936	Muss 'Em Up	Editor	
1936	Smartest Girl in Town	Editor	
1936	Murder on a Bridle Path	Editor	
1936	Bunker Bean	Editor	
1936	Grand Jury	Editor	
1937	Border Café	Editor	
1937	There Goes the Groom	Editor	
1937	Wise Girl	Editor	
1937	The Man Who Found Himself	Editor	
1937	Don't Tell the Wife	Editor	
1937	Criminal Lawyer	Editor	
1937	You Can't Buy Luck	Editor	
1937	The Life of the Party	Editor	
1937	The Big Shot	Editor	
1938	Joy of Living	Editor	
1938	The Affairs of Annabel	Editor	
1938	Blond Cheat	Editor	
1938	Next Time I Marry	Editor	
1938	A Man to Remember	Editor	
1939	The Great Man Votes	Editor	
1939	The Saint Strikes Back	Editor	
1939	They Made Her a Spy	Director	
1939	Panama Lady	Director	
1939	Three Sons	Director	
1939	Two Thoroughbreds	Director	
1939	The Spellbinder	Director	
1940	Anne of Windy Poplars	Director	
1940	Laddie	Director	
1940	The Saint Takes Over	Director	
1940	The Saint's Double Trouble	Director	
1941	Father Takes a Wife	Director	
1941	The Saint in Palm Springs	Director	
1941	They Met in Argentina	Director	Hively replaced Leslie Goodwins as director when Goodwins was hospitalized for pneumonia
1942	Four Jacks and a Jill	Director	
1942	Street of Chance	Director	
1944	Attack! The Battle of New Britain	Cinematographer, editor	
1945	Appointment in Tokyo	Director	Preserved by the Academy Film Archive in 2013.
1947	The Egg and I	Second unit director	
1948	Are You with It?	Director	
1948	You Gotta Stay Happy	Second unit director	
1949	Family Honeymoon	Second unit director	
1949	Criss Cross	Second unit director	
1949	Once More, My Darling	Second unit director	
1949	Take One False Step	Second unit director, associate producer	
1973	Starbird and Sweet William	Director, producer	
