= They Made Her a Spy =

1939 American film directed by Jack Hively

- Directed by: Jack Hively; Edward Donahue (filmmaker)
- Screenplay by: Michael Kanin; Jo Pagano
- Story by: George Bricker; Lionel Houser
- Produced by: Robert Sisk
- Starring: Sally Eilers; Allan Lane; Fritz Leiber; Frank M. Thomas
- Cinematography: Nicholas Musuraca
- Edited by: Harry Marker
- Music by: Roy Webb
- Production company: RKO Radio Pictures
- Release dates: March 29, 1939 (Premiere-New York City); April 14, 1939 (US)

They Made Her a Spy is a 1939 American spy drama film produced and distributed by RKO Radio Pictures. It was the first film directed by Jack Hively, who after toiling as an editor for RKO for the prior five years, was given the opportunity to direct, and starred Sally Eilers, Allan Lane, Fritz Leiber, and Frank M. Thomas. The screenplay, written by Jo Pagano and Academy Award winner Michael Kanin, was based on a story by George Bricker and Lionel Houser. The film premiered in New York City on March 29, 1939, and was released nationally two weeks later, on April 14.
