= Virginia Gilmore =

American actress (1919–1986)

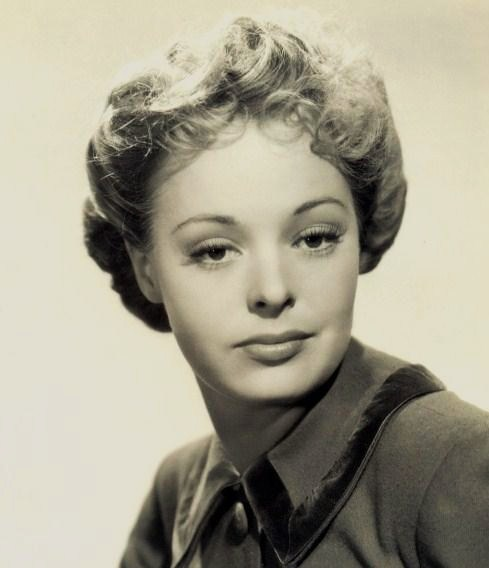
- Gilmore in 1941
- Born: Sherman Virginia Poole; July 26, 1919; El Monte, California, U.S.
- Died: March 28, 1986 (aged 66); Santa Barbara, California, U.S.
- Occupation: Actress
- Years active: 1939–1970
- Spouse: Yul Brynner (m. 1944; div. 1960)
- Children: 1

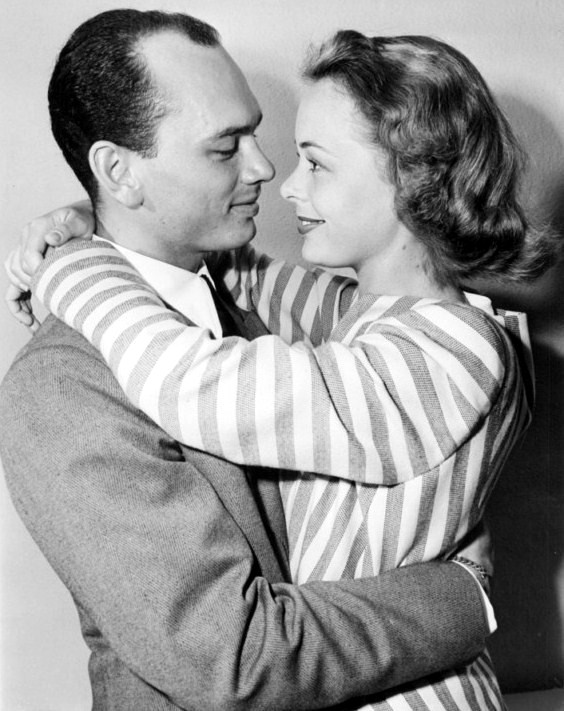
Yul Brynner and Virginia Gilmore

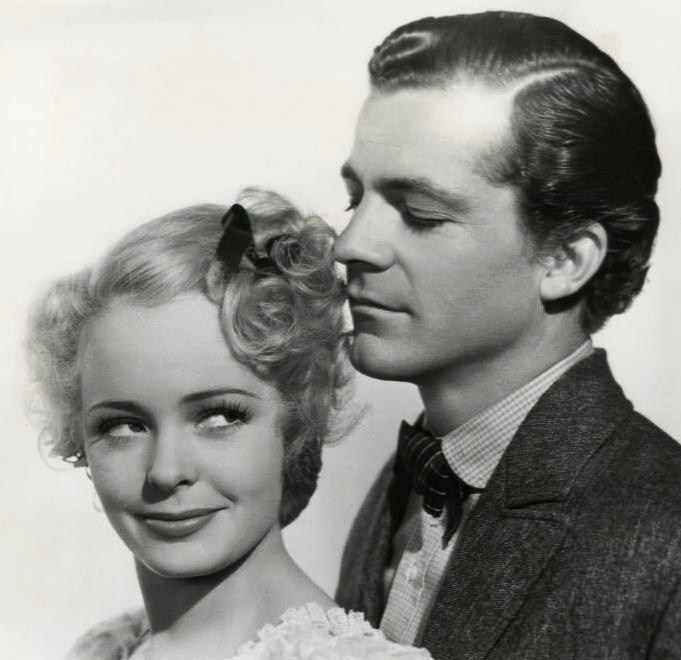
Virginia Gilmore and Dana Andrews in Jean Renoir's Swamp Water (1941)

Virginia Gilmore (born Sherman Virginia Poole; July 26, 1919 – March 28, 1986) was an American film, stage, and television actress.

== Career ==
Gilmore began her stage career in San Francisco at the age of 15, but moved to Los Angeles in 1939 to pursue work in films. When her movie career was not progressing, Gilmore mustered the nerve to approach Samuel Goldwyn at his home. As a result of their meeting, he promised her a screen test. She soon landed some small movie roles. Her better-known film appearances both occurred in 1941: Western Union, directed by Fritz Lang, and Swamp Water directed by Jean Renoir.

== Later years ==
When her movie role options began to dwindle, Gilmore left Los Angeles for New York City and started working on Broadway, where she had appeared in A Successful Calamity in 1934. In 1943, she played in Those Endearing Young Charms and The World's Full of Girls. In 1944, she played the title role in Dear Ruth, which was directed by Moss Hart. Her other Broadway credits include Truckline Cafe (1946), The Grey-eyed People (1952), and Critics Choice (1960).

Starting in the late 1940s, Gilmore had many television roles. In 1949, she and her husband, Yul Brynner, were featured on We're On, an NBC television series. Between 1966 and 1968, she taught drama at Yale University. In her later years, Gilmore was a leader in Alcoholics Anonymous (AA).

== Personal life ==
In 1944, she married Yul Brynner. The couple had one son, Yul "Rock" Brynner, before divorcing in 1960.

== Death ==
On March 28, 1986, Gilmore died from chronic obstructive pulmonary disease (COPD) at her home in Santa Barbara, California, aged 66. Upon her death, she was cremated by the Neptune Society and her ashes scattered at sea.

== Filmography ==
Year	Title	Role	Notes
1939	Winter Carnival	Margie Stafford	
1940	Laddie	Pamela Pryor	
1940	Manhattan Heartbeat	Dottie Haley	
1940	Jennie	Jennie Collins	
1941	Tall, Dark and Handsome	Judy Miller	
1941	Western Union	Sue Creighton	
1941	Swamp Water	Mabel MacKenzie	
1941	Mr. District Attorney in the Carter Case	Terry Parker	
1942	Sundown Jim	Toni Black	
1942	The Pride of the Yankees	Myra	
1942	Berlin Correspondent	Karen Hauen	
1942	The Loves of Edgar Allan Poe	Elmira Royster	
1942	Orchestra Wives	Elsie	
1942	That Other Woman	Emily Borden	
1943	Chetniks! The Fighting Guerrillas	Natalia	
1945	Wonder Man	Sailor's Girl Friend	
1948	Close-Up	Peggy Lake	
1952	Walk East on Beacon	Millie Zalenko / Teresa Henning	

== Stage performances ==
- Those Endearing Young Charms (1943)
- The World's Full of Girls (1943)
- Dear Ruth (1944)
- Truckline Cafe (with Marlon Brando) (1946)
- The Grey-Eyed People (1952)
- Critic's Choice (with Henry Fonda) (1960)
