= Laddie (1940 film) =

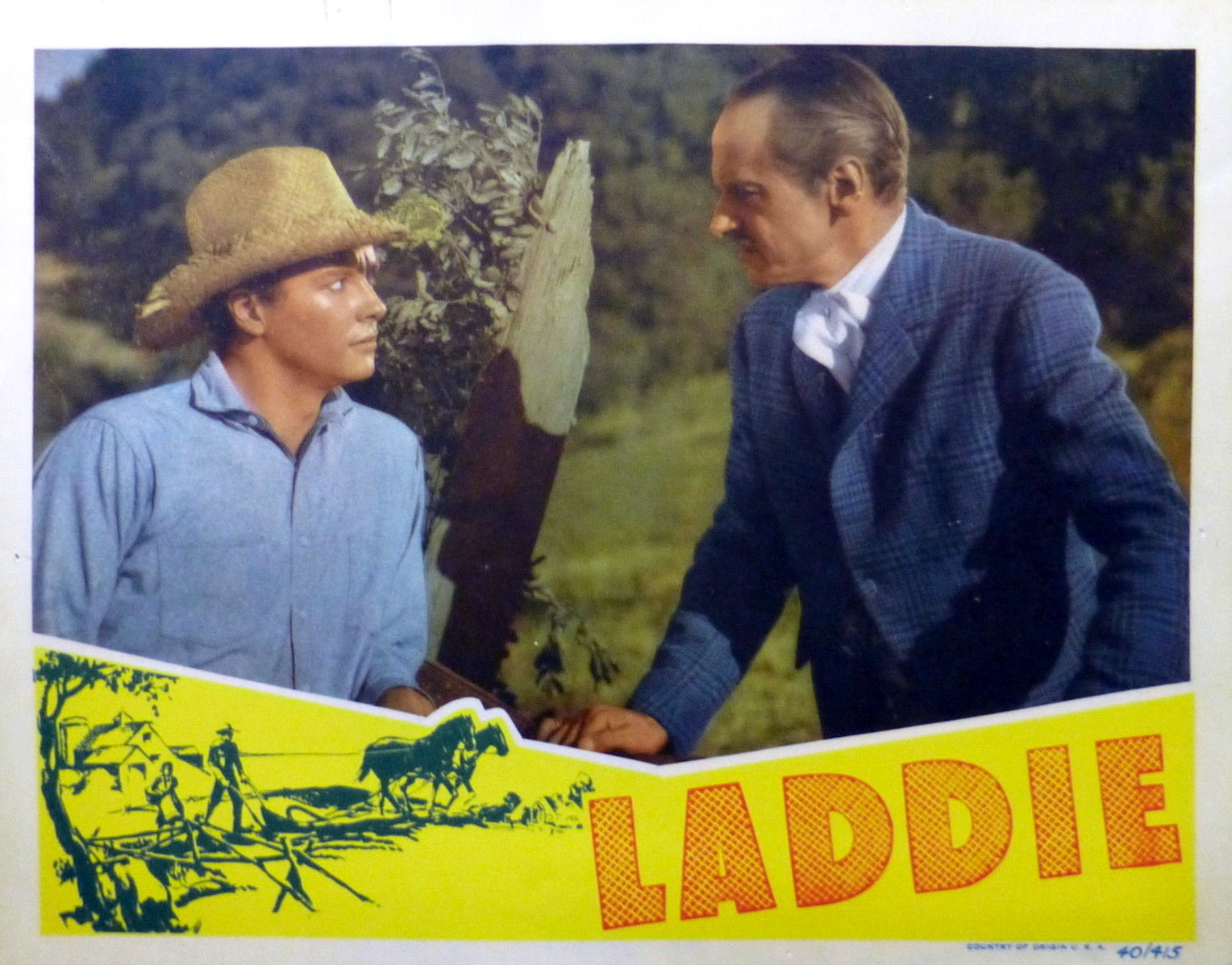
- Lobby card
- Directed by: Jack Hively
- Screenplay by: Jerome Cady; Bert Granet
- Based on: Laddie, A True Blue Story by Gene Stratton-Porter
- Produced by: Cliff Reid executive Lee Marcus
- Starring: Tim Holt; Virginia Gilmore; Joan Carroll
- Cinematography: Harry J. Wild
- Edited by: George Hively
- Music by: Roy Webb
- Distributed by: RKO Radio Pictures
- Release date: October 18, 1940
- Running time: 70 minutes / 6,297ft
- Country: United States
- Language: English

RKO Radio Pictures's Laddie is a 1940 American drama film starring Tim Holt, Virginia Gilmore and Joan Carroll and directed by Jack Hively. It is the third film adaptation based on Gene Stratton-Porter's novel, Laddie, A True Blue Story (1913), and previously had been filmed in 1926 and by RKO in 1935.

== Plot ==
An honest farmer's son, Laddie Stanton, falls in love with Pamela Pryor, the daughter of the Englishman who just bought the land next door. Her father is a disdainful and morose man fixated at the dishonorable discharge of his son Robert and isn't at all happy with the prospect of having Laddie as a son-in-law forbidding Pamela's hand in marriage to Laddie a "field hand".

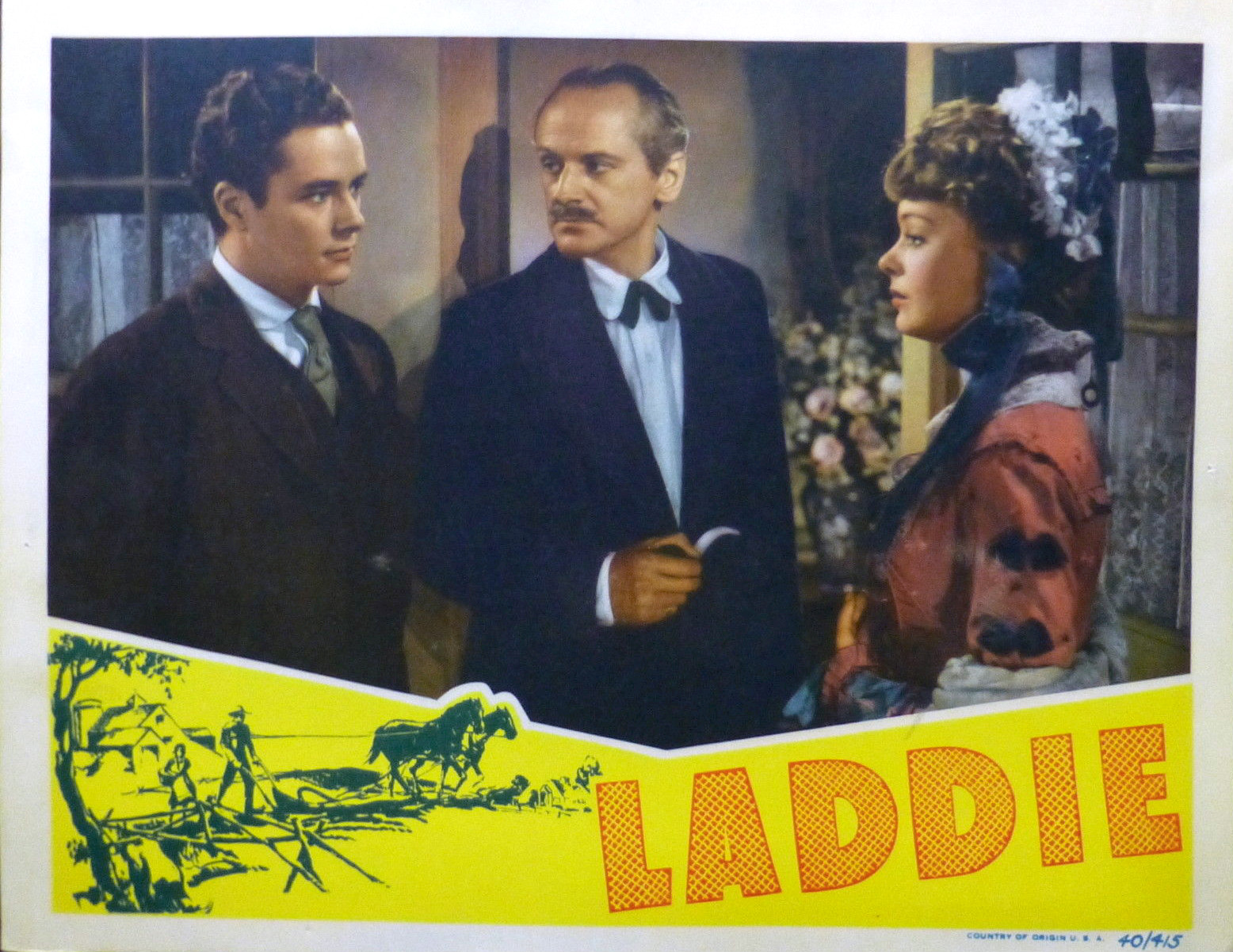
Mr. Pryor disapproving of Laddie and Pamela's marriage.

Pamela tries to make Laddie get another profession, to please her father and to be able to continue their relation. The insulted Laddie is very upset and regards Pamela's plead as disrespectful to him and his family. After speaking with his family, Laddie decides to prove himself to Mr.Pryor by buying a portion of his estate and grabs his attention as he begins to farm on his plot of land. This infuriates Mr.Pryor who rejects the sale of his land to Laddie and further worsens his hopes of marrying Pamela. Furthermore, Pamela perceives Laddie's actions as childlike and unhelpful.

However, from Pamela's introduction in the film, Laddie's kid sister, commonly referred to as 'Little Sister', sees Pamela as 'the princess' and as the woman who is meant to be with Laddie and thus, she attempts to reconcile the lovers and their relationship. When her initial efforts are unsuccessful, Little Sister sees her opportunity when Robert Pryor, Mr.Pryor's disowned and disgraced son, comes to visit and falls ill.

Upon Pamela's request, the Stanton family takes him in when his father doesn't and call Dr. Barnes to help take care of him. While 'hunting' in the woods, Little Sister comes across Mr.Pryor and mistakenly blurts out that Robert is staying with them. The old man is infuriated and goes to visit the family immediately with the intent to kill his disgraceful son. When Little Sister informs Laddie of her encounter, Laddie stands up to Mr.Pryor demanding that he leave his gun behind before he can enter their house. After this, Mr. and Mrs. Stanton mitigate Mr. Pryor's anger by retelling the story of the prodigal son and informing him of Robert's illness. After accepting the Stanton family's wisdom, Mr.Pryor forgives his son and gives Pamela's hand in marriage to Laddie.

Later on, we see the teary eyed Pamela apologize to Laddie belittling his family and their profession of farming. The two lovers are reconciled.

== Cast ==
- Tim Holt as Laddie Stanton
- Virginia Gilmore as Pamela Pryor
- Joan Carroll as Sister Stanton
- Spring Byington as Mrs. Stanton
- Robert Barrat as Mr. John Stanton
- Miles Mander as Mr. Pryor
- Esther Dale as Sarah, the Housekeeper
- Sammy McKim as Leon Stanton
- Joan Leslie as Shelley Stanton
- Martha O'Driscoll as Sally Stanton
- Rand Brooks as Peter Dover
- Mary Forbes as Mrs. Anna Pryor
- Peter Cushing as Robert Pryor
- Harry Humphrey as Minister
- Dorothy Lee as Louise
- Joe Bernard as Tom Crispin
- Paul Maxey as Mr. Wilson
- George Irving as Dr.Barnes

== Background ==
The novel Laddie, A True Blue Story by Stratton-Porter on which the film is based was published in 1913. The inspiration for Stratton-Porter's novel came from an early life experience of when her teenage brother Leander drowned in the Wabash River on July 6, 1872. The title character of Laddie is modeled after Stratton-Porter's deceased older brother, Leander, to whom she gave the nickname of Laddie. As in Stratton-Porter's own family, Laddie is connected with the land and identifies with Stratton-Porter's father's vocation of farming. Furthermore, Stratton-Porter considered this novel to be quite autobiographical and so the character of Little Sister played by Joan Carroll on screen is representative of Stratton Porter's childhood self sharing a similar personality, interests and family dynamic.

== Production and reception ==
The actress Virginia Gilmore (plays Pamela Pryor) was borrowed from Samuel Goldwyn Productions. Filming had started on 1 June 1940. The film was reviewed and rated consistently rated as above average in various newspapers, film magazines and film review journals upon its release. However, the common view was that the film was overall unremarkable and was "best for the hinterlands."
