= Obliging Young Lady =

1942 film by Richard Wallace

- Theatrical release poster
- Directed by: Richard Wallace
- Screenplay by: Frank Ryan; Bert Granet
- Story by: Arthur T. Horman
- Produced by: Howard Benedict
- Starring: Joan Carroll; Edmond O'Brien; Ruth Warrick
- Cinematography: Nicholas Musuraca
- Edited by: Henry Berman
- Music by: Roy Webb
- Distributed by: RKO Radio Pictures
- Release date: 30 January 1942
- Running time: 80 min.
- Country: United States
- Language: English

Obliging Young Lady is a 1942 American romantic comedy film directed by Richard Wallace and starring Joan Carroll, Edmond O'Brien, Ruth Warrick.

== Plot ==
On the instructions of their lawyer, the wealthy young daughter of divorcing parents is removed to a mountain resort, complete with a decoy mother, to protect her from the publicity. The situation is immediately complicated by persistent reporters, a romantic interest for the fake mother, and a convention of birdwatchers.

== Cast ==
- Joan Carroll as Bridget Potter
- Edmond O'Brien as "Red" Reddy
- Ruth Warrick as Linda Norton
- Eve Arden as "Space" O'Shea
- Robert Smith as Charles Baker
- Franklin Pangborn as Professor Gibney
- Marjorie Gateson as Mira Potter
- John Miljan as George Potter
- George Cleveland as Lodge Manager
- Luis Alberni as Riccardi
- Charles Lane as Detective
- Fortunio Bonanova as Chef
- Andrew Tombes as Conductor
- Almira Sessions as Maid
- Pierre Watkin as Markham
- Florence Gill as Miss Hollyrod
- Sidney Blackmer as Attorney
- Jed Prouty as Judge Rufus
- George Chandler as Skip
- Emory Parnell as Motorcycle Policeman
- Ernie Stanton as Cedric (uncredited)

== Reception ==
The film lost $118,000 at the box office.
