= Will Osborne (singer) =

Canadian-born American bandleader, trombonist, and crooner (1905–1981)

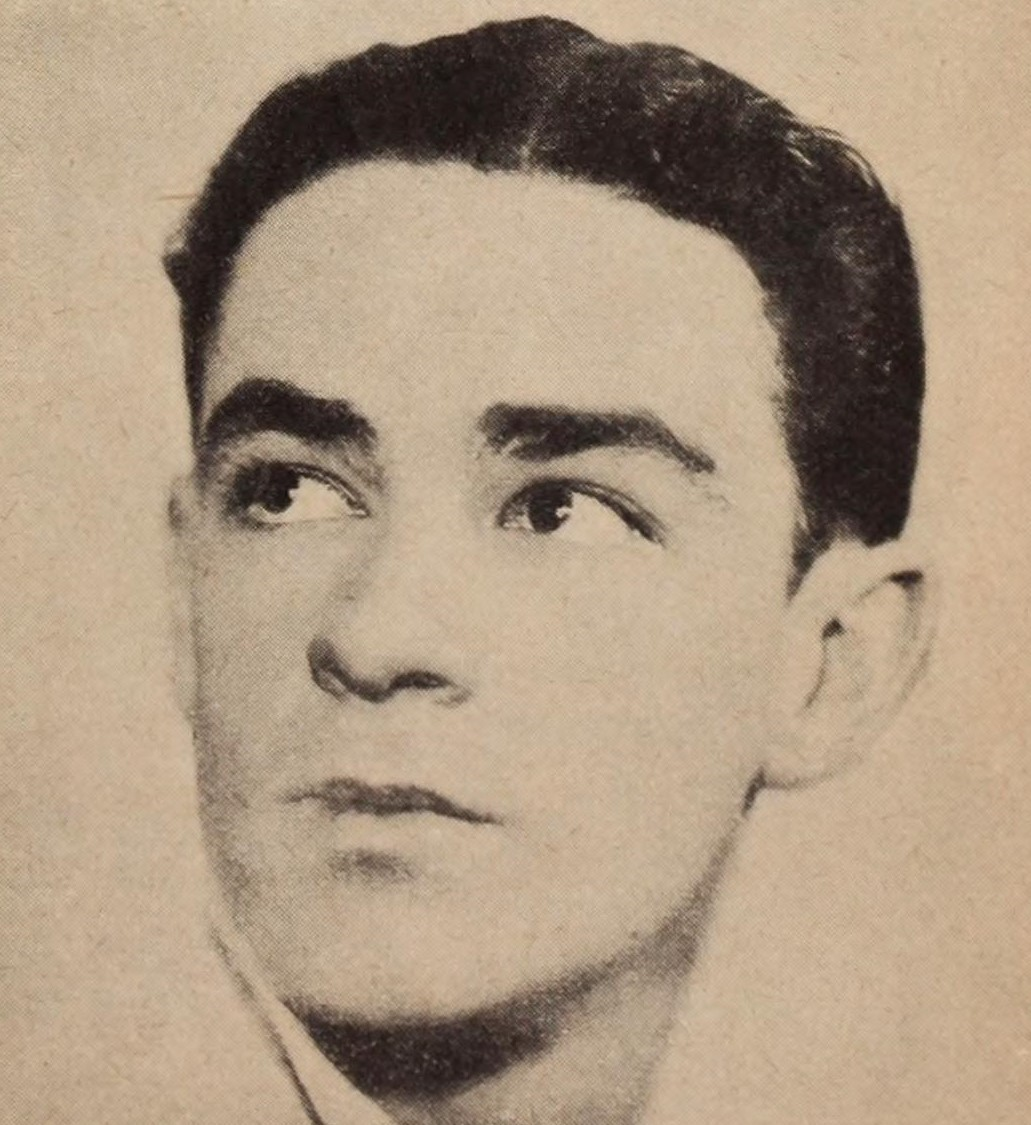
- 1930

Background information
- Born: William Osborne Oliphant; November 25, 1905; Toronto, Ontario, Canada
- Died: October 22, 1981 (aged 75) Santa Monica, California
- Genres: Jazz
- Occupations: Bandleader, singer
- Instruments: Drums, trombone, and tenor voice
- Years active: 1924–1957
- Labels: Columbia; Melotone; Perfect; Decca; Varsity; A.R.C.

Will Osborne (November 25, 1905 – October 22, 1981) was a Canadian-born American bandleader, trombonist, and crooner.

== Biography ==
Will Osborne, the stage name of William Osborne Oliphant, began his musical career as a drummer and brass player, both the cornet and trumpet and especially the slide trombone. After playing in local and regional bands in his native Canada, Osborne formed his own band and began his bandleading career in 1924. In 1929, the rapid rise in the radio popularity of Rudy Vallee prompted Osborne to add his own vocals to his recordings. In common with Vallee, Osborne was classified as a lyric baritone but with the timbre, or tone quality, of a light lyric tenor. His phrasing mirrored the crooning vocal style similar to Rudy Vallée's.

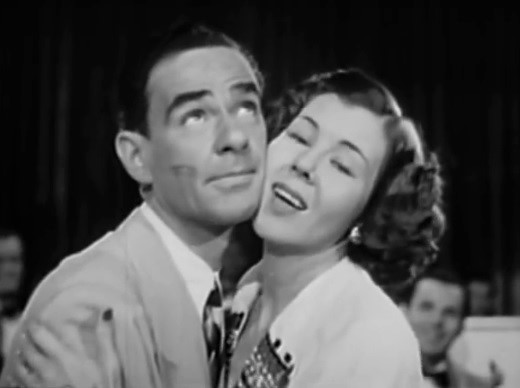
Osborne and Mary Treen in Swing Parade of 1946 (1946)

In April 1929, while Vallée and his band were performing in vaudeville at the Palace Theater and preparing to leave for Hollywood for the filming of The Vagabond Lover, Vallee invited Osborne to take over for him at his Villa Vallee nightclub and also persuaded his (Vallee's) radio station to broadcast Osborne's band. Soon after, Osborne claimed that Vallee had appropriated his crooning style and was therefore an "Osborne imitator." Vallee, now in Hollywood, paid little attention to Osborne's claims initially, but thereafter he and Osborne entered into a publicity "war" based upon their supposed rivalry.

In his book, The Big Bands, George T. Simon noted that the tenor of the times contributed to Osborne's early success: "Then in 1929 came the stock-market crash and the Depression. The high living and the tempos slowed down. The mood and the music of the country changed. The search for security, for sweetness and light, was reflected in the country's musical tastes — in its acceptance of crooners like Rudy Vallee and Will Osborne, and then Bing Crosby and Russ Columbo, in its preference for dance music that encouraged romance and sentiment and escape."

Simon described the band that Osborne formed in 1935 as "a stylized outfit that featured rich, deep-toned brass, emphasizing, of all things, trumpets plus glissing trombones blown through megaphones." Osborne dubbed his band's new sound as "Slide Music."

Osborne and his orchestra appeared in the 1946 Monogram musical comedy film Swing Parade of 1946. A 1948 newspaper article reported that, at that time, "The band holds the all-time attendance record at Palomar Ballroom in Los Angeles."

The Band's theme song was The Gentleman Awaits.

Osborne later became one of the leaders of the orchestra for The Abbott and Costello Show.

Osborne retired from bandleading in 1957. He then became entertainment director for Harvey's Casino in Lake Tahoe, Nevada.
