= Brown and Carney =

Mid-20th century American comedy duo

- Born: Wallace Brown and David Bougal
- Employer: RKO Radio Pictures

Comedy career
- Years active: 1943 to 1946
- Genre: Comedy team

Brown and Carney were Wally Brown and Alan Carney, a movie comedy team active from 1943 to 1946.

== Notes ==
Wally Brown (born Oct. 9, 1904 in Malden, Massachusetts) and Alan Carney (born David Bougal, Dec. 22, 1911 in Brooklyn, N. Y.) were under contract with RKO Radio Pictures. The two actors had appeared in three films in 1943 when RKO decided to team them as their answer to Abbott and Costello. Brown & Carney's first film as a team was Adventures of a Rookie, a military comedy along the lines of Abbott and Costello's 1941 film Buck Privates. RKO sent Brown & Carney on a vaudeville tour together in 1944. Brown's screen character is usually "Jerry Miles" and Carney's is usually "Mike Strager." The only exceptions are Seven Days Ashore, Step Lively, and Vacation in Reno. Actress Anne Jeffreys appeared in four of Brown and Carney's films.

Most of the Brown & Carney comedies had connections to other films. Brown and Carney's third film Step Lively (1944) was based on the same play that inspired the Marx Brothers film Room Service. Zombies on Broadway (1945), co-starring Bela Lugosi, is a semi-sequel to the Val Lewton film I Walked with a Zombie; Sir Lancelot reprises his role as a singer. Radio Stars on Parade (1946) is notable for guest appearances by several popular radio personalities of the time: Don Wilson, Ralph Edwards, Skinnay Ennis, and musical acts.

In 1945, screenwriter Monte Brice went through older RKO scripts to find a new idea for Brown & Carney's next movie and combined plot elements from Jack Oakie's Super-Sleuth (1937) and Wheeler and Woolsey's The Nitwits (1935). The finished film was Genius at Work, which also starred Bela Lugosi, as well as Lionel Atwill in his last feature-film appearance. This film would become Brown & Carney's eighth and final film together as a team; the studio discontinued most of its "B" picture production when tycoon Howard Hughes purchased the studio.

On occasion Brown and Carney appeared in the same film but not together (Mexican Spitfire's Blessed Event, Vacation in Reno). For 1961's The Absent-Minded Professor, they were listed in promotional material as "the comedy team of Brown and Carney" as though it was designed as a comeback, but they shared no scenes.

After the team's split, Brown continued working in films and appeared on television shows such as I Married Joan, Wagon Train, and My Three Sons until his death in 1961. Brown had also been teamed with Tim Ryan in the Columbia Pictures short film French Fried Frolic in 1949, and with Jack Kirkwood in four RKO Pictures short films in 1950 and 1951. Carney also continued working in films, appearing in Walt Disney films and also had a cameo as a police sergeant in Stanley Kramer's 1963 film It's a Mad, Mad, Mad, Mad World.

== Availability ==
Four of the eight Brown & Carney features were released in a DVD collection entitled "The RKO Brown & Carney Comedy Collection" in January 2015 by Warner Archive. This two-disc set includes Adventures of a Rookie, Rookies in Burma, The Girl Rush, and Genius at Work. Step Lively was released on DVD by Warner Home Video in May 2008. Zombies on Broadway is available as part of the "Karloff & Lugosi Horror Classics" DVD set, released by Warner Home Video in October 2009.

== Films ==
- Gangway for Tomorrow (RKO, 1943)
- Mexican Spitfire's Blessed Event (RKO, 1943)
- Around the World (RKO, 1943)
- Adventures of a Rookie (RKO, 1944) (first film as a team)
- Rookies in Burma (RKO, 1944) (sequel to Adventures of a Rookie)
- Seven Days Ashore (RKO, 1944)
- Step Lively (RKO, 1944) (with Frank Sinatra) (remake of Marx Brothers' film Room Service)
- Girl Rush (RKO, 1944) with Robert Mitchum
- Zombies on Broadway (RKO, 1945) with Bela Lugosi
- Radio Stars on Parade (RKO, 1945)
- Genius at Work (RKO, 1946) (last film as a team) with Bela Lugosi (remake of Jack Oakie's Super-Sleuth and Wheeler and Woolsey The Nitwits
- Vacation in Reno (RKO, 1946) (no scenes together)
- Who Was That Lady? (Columbia, 1960)
- The Absent-Minded Professor (Walt Disney, 1961) (Brown as Coach Elkins, Carney as First Referee)

== See also ==
- Vaudeville
- List of comedians
