= Rita Corday =

American actress (1920–1992)

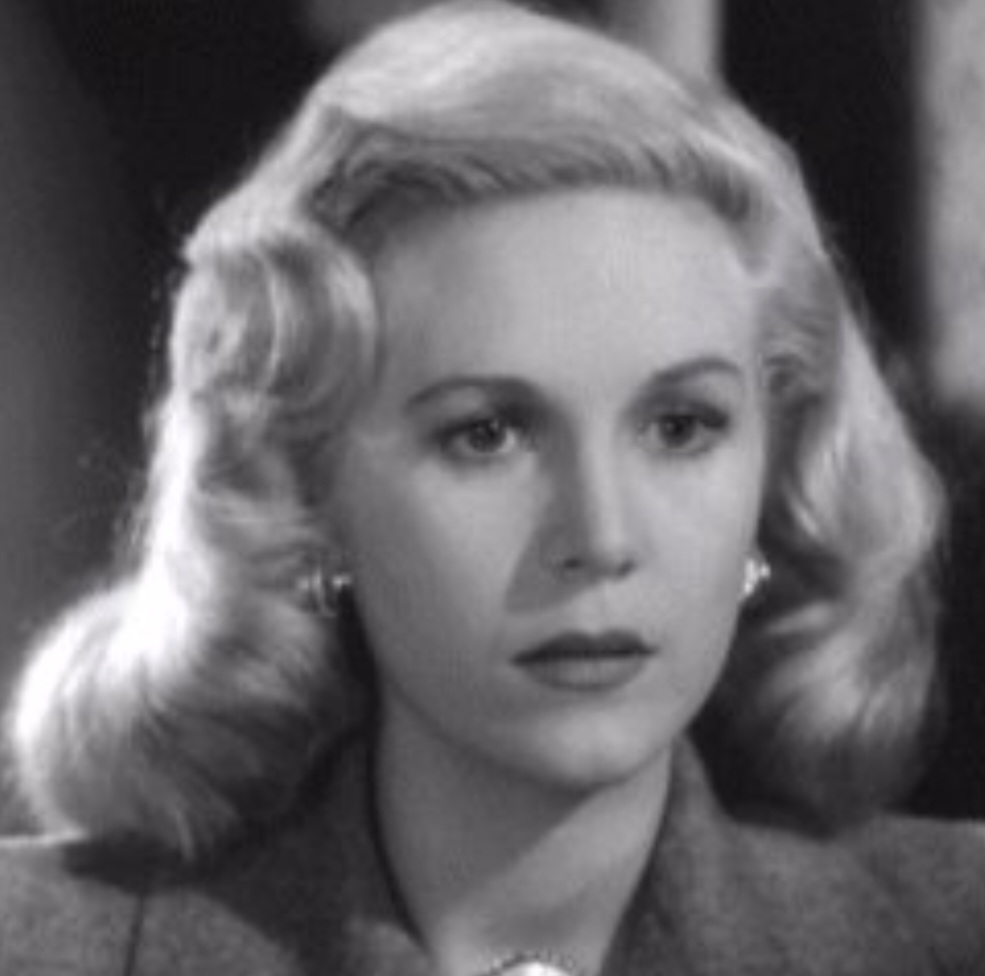
- Corday in Dick Tracy vs. Cueball (1946)
- Born: Jeanne Paule Teipo-Ite-Marma Croset; October 20, 1920; Papeete, Tahiti, French Polynesia
- Died: November 23, 1992 (aged 72); Century City, Los Angeles, U.S.
- Resting place: Forest Lawn Memorial Park, Hollywood Hills, California
- Other names: Paula Corday; Paule Croset
- Occupation: Actress
- Years active: 1943–1954
- Spouse: Harold Nebenzal (m. 1947; div. 1961)
- Children: 2

Rita Corday (born Jeanne Paule Teipo-Ite-Marma Croset; October 20, 1920 – November 23, 1992) was an American actress. She appeared in 30 films during the 1940s and 1950s. She was sometimes billed as Paula Corday or Paule Croset.

== Biography ==
Rita Corday was born Jeanne Paule Teipo-Ite-Marma Croset in Papeete, Tahiti, one of two children born to a Swiss-French father, Marc Paul Croset, traveling representative of a Swiss watch company, and an English mother, the former Lily Wigglesworth. She received theatrical training in Switzerland, Paris and Shanghai.

In 1942, RKO Pictures signed Corday to a long-term contract. She made her first film appearance in January 1943, in Hitler's Children. During her career in Hollywood, she appeared mostly in second features. In her later films she was billed as Paula Corday or Paule Croset.

== Personal life ==
In 1943, Corday announced her engagement to Navy Ensign Marshall Buell. She married producer Harold Nebenzal in 1947 and, in 1954, retired to raise their two children. They divorced in 1961.

Corday died November 21, 1992, after surgery, from complications of diabetes. She is interred at Forest Lawn Memorial Park in Hollywood Hills, California.

== Partial filmography ==
| Year | Title | Role | Notes |
|---|---|---|---|
| 1943 | Hitler's Children | Young matron | Uncredited |
| 1943 | The Falcon Strikes Back | Mia Bruger | |
| 1943 | Mr. Lucky | Girl | Uncredited |
| 1943 | Mexican Spitfire's Blessed Event | | |
| 1943 | The Adventures of a Rookie | Ruth - Party Guest | |
| 1943 | Gildersleeve on Broadway | Model | Uncredited |
| 1943 | Gangway for Tomorrow | Georgine | Uncredited |
| 1943 | Government Girl | Girl in Hotel Lobby | Uncredited |
| 1943 | The Falcon and the Co-eds | Marguerita Serena | |
| 1944 | Girl Rush | Member of troupe | Uncredited |
| 1944 | The Falcon in Hollywood | Lili D'Allio | |
| 1945 | Pan-Americana | Pan American girl | Uncredited |
| 1945 | The Body Snatcher | Mrs. Marsh | |
| 1945 | What a Blonde | Sonya | Uncredited |
| 1945 | The Falcon in San Francisco | Joan Marshall | |
| 1945 | West of the Pecos | Suzanne | |
| 1946 | The Truth About Murder | Peggy | |
| 1946 | The Falcon's Alibi | Joan Meredith | |
| 1946 | Dick Tracy vs. Cueball | Mona Clyde | |
| 1947 | The Exile | Katie | Credited as Paule Croset |
| 1951 | The Sword of Monte Cristo | Lady Christiane | Credited as Paula Corday |
| 1951 | Too Young to Kiss | Denise Dorcet | Credited as Paula Corday |
| 1952 | You for Me | Lucille Brown | Credited as Paula Corday |
| 1952 | Because You're Mine | Francesca Landers | Credited as Paula Corday |
| 1952 | The Black Castle | Elga Von Bruno | Credited as Paula Corday |
| 1954 | The French Line | Celeste | Credited as Paula Corday |
| 1956 | G.E. Summer Originals | | TV series, episode "Dawn at Damascus"; credited as Paula Corday |
