= Erford Gage =

American actor (1912–1945)

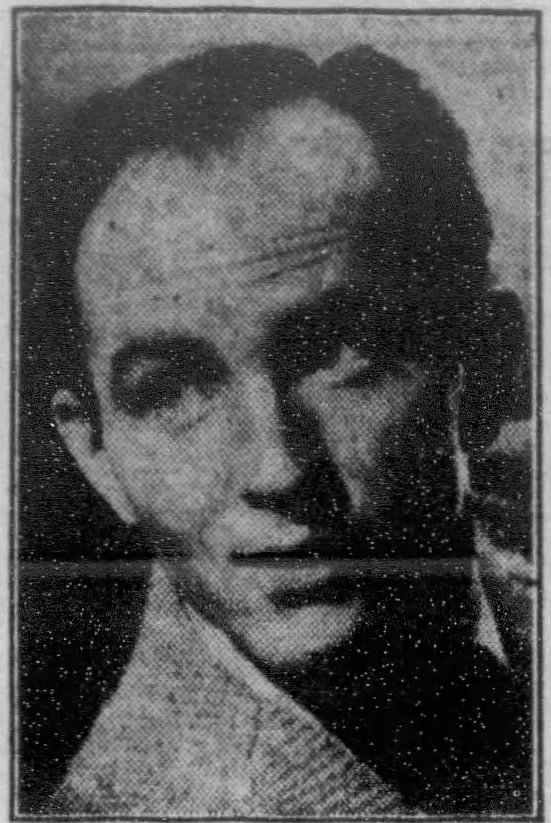
- Born: Erford Holmes Gage; April 5, 1912; Northfield, Massachusetts, U.S.
- Died: March 17, 1945 (aged 32); Luzon, Philippines
- Occupation: Actor
- Years active: 1942–1944

Erford Holmes Gage (April 5, 1912 – March 17, 1945) was an American actor. After several years as a stage actor, he was active in RKO Pictures films between 1942 and 1944. In his movies, he often played shady characters or outright villains, most notably the sadistic Nazi Dr. Schmidt in Hitler's Children. In a different vein, he appeared as the no-nonsense Sgt. Burke in the two low-budget GI comedies starring the team of Brown and Carney.

== Personal life ==
Gage served as a staff sergeant in the 20th Infantry Regiment of the United States Army during World War II and was killed in action during the Battle of Luzon on March 17, 1945. During his service, he was awarded the Silver Star, Bronze Star Medal, and Purple Heart. He is buried at Manila American Cemetery. According to obituaries at the time, his widow was actress Nell King.

== Filmography ==
Year	Title	Role	Notes
1942	Seven Miles from Alcatraz	Paul Brenner	
1943	Hitler's Children	Dr. Schmidt	
1943	The Falcon Strikes Back	Rickey Davis	
1943	Bombardier	Meyer	Uncredited
1943	Mr. Lucky	Henchman	
1943	The Falcon in Danger	Evan Morley	
1943	Mexican Spitfire's Blessed Event	Minor Role	Uncredited
1943	The Fallen Sparrow	Roman	Uncredited
1943	The Seventh Victim	Jason Hoag	
1943	The Adventures of a Rookie	Sgt. Burke	
1943	Gangway for Tomorrow	Dan Barton	
1943	Rookies in Burma	Sergeant Burke	
1944	The Curse of the Cat People	Police Captain	
1944	Days of Glory	Col. Prilenko	Uncredited
