= Wally Brown =

American comedian (1904–1961)

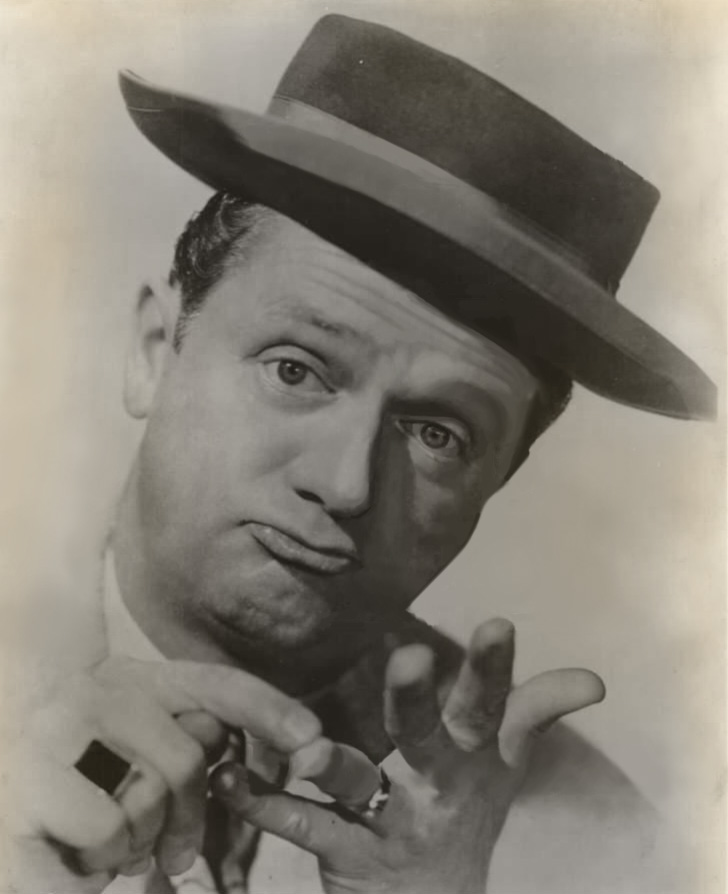
- Wally Brown in 1948
- Born: Wallace Edgar Brown; October 8, 1904; Malden, Massachusetts, U.S.
- Died: November 13, 1961 (aged 57); Los Angeles, California, U.S.
- Resting place: Forest Lawn Memorial Park (Hollywood Hills)
- Occupation: Actor/Comedian
- Years active: 1930s–61
- Spouse: Mildred Lane (his death)
- Children: 2

Wallace Edgar Brown (October 8, 1904 – November 13, 1961) was an American actor and comedian. In the 1940s, he performed as the comic partner of Alan Carney.

== Early years ==
Wallace Edgar Brown was born in Malden, Massachusetts, the son of Herbert and Lillian (Garnier) Brown. His father was a compositor for the Malden Evening News. Brown left Malden High School during his junior year, but he later graduated from Malden Commercial Business School and took courses at Chicago University. Before his career in entertainment began, he worked at a drug-store soda fountain in Malden, was a second chef at a hotel in York Beach, Maine, and was a printer's devil at a print shop in Boston, among other jobs. He also performed locally with his father as an amateur.

== Early career ==
Brown debuted professionally in Beacon Falls, Pennsylvania, with the Jimmy Evans Song Box Revue. In addition to entertaining, he handled baggage for the troupe. After that, he began performing with the Carson Sisters. He performed in vaudeville for 15 years before his first appearance in film.

== Film ==
Brown began his film career in 1942 in Hollywood at RKO Radio Pictures with the film Petticoat Larceny. When RKO decided to emulate the comedy team Abbott and Costello, he was paired with Alan Carney, creating "Brown & Carney."

The duo premiered with the military comedies Adventures of a Rookie and its sequel, Rookies in Burma. Of their eight films together, one of the most notable was Zombies on Broadway co-starring Bela Lugosi, a semisequel to Val Lewton's I Walked With a Zombie. Brown and Carney's contracts were terminated in 1946, after which they pursued solo careers. In the 1940s and 1950s, both appeared in various roles for Leslie Goodwins films. They reunited in Who Was That Lady? (1960) and in Disney's The Absent-Minded Professor (1961), but did not interact with each other.

Brown was later teamed with Tim Ryan in the Columbia Pictures short film French Fried Frolic in 1949. He was also teamed with Jack Kirkwood in four RKO Pictures short films in 1950 and 1951.

Along with Alan Carney, Brown was to be given a role in It's a Mad, Mad, Mad, Mad World (1963), but died not long before filming began.

== Television and radio ==
On television, Brown portrayed Jed Fame on Cimarron City and Chauncey Kowalski on The Roaring 20's.

In 1953, Brown had billing over an unknown Paul Newman in the fourth-season premiere episode of The Web, titled "One for the Road".

He made several guest appearances on Perry Mason, including in the role of murderer Harry Mitchell in the 1958 episode "The Case of the Gilded Lily". Brown had also been a regular cast member in television shows such as I Married Joan and Daniel Boone. Brown's last years were filled with guest appearances in television, his last one in My Three Sons.

On radio, Brown was a regular on The Abbott and Costello Show.

== Personal life and death ==
Brown was married to dancer Mildred Lane, and they had a son and a daughter. On November 13, 1961, he died of a throat hemorrhage in Valley Presbyterian Hospital in Los Angeles, aged 57.

== Filmography ==
- Dodge City (1939) - Cattle Auctioneer (uncredited)
- All Through the Night (1942) - 2nd Police Lieutenant (uncredited)
- Radio Runaround (1943, Short) - Harry, Radio Station Announcer
- Mexican Spitfire's Blessed Event (1943, with Alan Carney, but not as a team) - Sagebrush Inn Desk Clerk (uncredited)
- Petticoat Larceny (1943) - Sam Colfax
- The Adventures of a Rookie (1943, with Alan Carney) - Jerry Miles
- The Seventh Victim (1943) - Durk (uncredited)
- Gangway for Tomorrow (1943) - Sam
- Around the World (1943) - Clipper Pilot
- Rookies in Burma (1943, with Alan Carney) - Jerry Miles
- Seven Days Ashore (1944, with Alan Carney) - Monty Stephens
- Step Lively (1944, with Alan Carney) - Binion
- Girl Rush (1944, with Alan Carney) - Jerry Miles
- Zombies on Broadway (1945, with Alan Carney) - Jerry Miles
- Radio Stars on Parade (1945, with Alan Carney) - Jerry Miles
- From This Day Forward (1946) - Jake Beesley
- Notorious (1946) - Mr. Hopkins
- Genius at Work (1946, with Alan Carney) - Jerry Miles
- Lady Luck (1946) - Narrator (voice, uncredited)
- Vacation in Reno (1946, with Alan Carney, but not as a team) - Eddie Roberts
- Bachelor Blues (1948, Short) - Dorothy's Boyfriend
- Family Honeymoon (1948) - Tom Roscoe
- Backstage Follies (1948, Short)
- Heart Troubles (1949, Short) - Wally
- Come to the Stable (1949) - Howard Sheldon - Bob's Agent (uncredited)
- French Fried Frolic (1949, Short, With Tim Ryan) - Wally
- Put Some Money in the Pot (1950, Short, With Jack Kirkwood) - Wally
- Photo Phonies (1950, Short) - Wally
- Brooklyn Buckaroos (1950, Short, With Jack Kirkwood) - Wally
- Tinhorn Troubadors (1951, Short, With Jack Kirkwood) - Wally
- As Young as You Feel (1951) - Horace Gallagher
- From Rogues to Riches (1951, Short, With Jack Kirkwood) - Wally
- The High and the Mighty (1954) - Lenny Wilby, navigator
- Untamed (1955) - Secondary Role (uncredited)
- The Wild Dakotas (1956) - McGraw
- Untamed Youth (1957) - Pinky, the cook
- The Joker Is Wild (1957) - Las Vegas Heckler (uncredited)
- The Left Handed Gun (1958) - Deputy Moon
- Wink of an Eye (1958) - Sheriff Cantrick
- Alias Jesse James (1959) - Dirty Dog Bartender (uncredited)
- Westbound (1959) - Stubby
- The Mouse That Roared (1959) - Air Raid Warden (uncredited)
- Holiday for Lovers (1959) - Joe McDougal
- The Best of Everything (1959) - Drunk (uncredited)
- Who Was That Lady? (1960) - Irate Man on Telephone (uncredited)
- The Absent-Minded Professor (1961) - Coach Elkins
- My Darling Judge (1961, TV Movie)
- The George Raft Story (1961) - Mike Jones (uncredited)
- Wanted Dead or Alive (1961) – season 3 episode 15 – Bartender

== See also ==
- Brown and Carney
