= Radio Stars on Parade =

1945 film by Leslie Goodwins

- Directed by: Leslie Goodwins; Harry D'Arcy (assistant)
- Screenplay by: Robert E. Kent; Monte Brice
- Story by: Robert E. Kent
- Produced by: Ben Stoloff
- Cinematography: Harry Wild
- Edited by: Edward W. Williams
- Music by: Constantin Bakaleinikoff
- Production company: RKO Radio Pictures
- Release date: August 1, 1945 (US)
- Running time: 69 minutes
- Country: United States
- Language: English

Radio Stars on Parade is a 1945 American comedy film directed by Leslie Goodwins from a screenplay by Robert E. Kent and Monte Brice, from Kent's original story. Produced and distributed by RKO Radio Pictures, it was released on August 1, 1945. The film stars the comedy team of Brown and Carney (Wally Brown and Alan Carney), along with Frances Langford.

== Cast ==
- Wally Brown as Jerry Miles
- Alan Carney as Mike Strager
- Frances Langford as Sally
- Sheldon Leonard as Lucky
- Ralph Edwards as himself
- Don Wilson as Announcer
- Emory Parnell as Chief Inspector
