= The Truth About Murder =

1946 film by Lew Landers

- Theatrical release poster
- Directed by: Lew Landers
- Screenplay by: Lawrence Kimble; Hilda Gordon; Eric Taylor
- Produced by: Herman Schlom
- Starring: Bonita Granville; Morgan Conway; Rita Corday; Don Douglas; June Clayworth
- Cinematography: Frank Redman
- Edited by: Edward W. Williams
- Music by: Leigh Harline
- Production company: RKO Pictures
- Distributed by: RKO Pictures
- Release date: July 26, 1946
- Running time: 63 minutes
- Country: United States
- Language: English

The Truth About Murder is a 1946 American mystery film directed by Lew Landers, written by Lawrence Kimble, Hilda Gordon and Eric Taylor, and starring Bonita Granville, Morgan Conway, Rita Corday, Don Douglas and June Clayworth. It was released on July 26, 1946, by RKO Pictures.

== Plot ==
Christine Allen administers lie detector tests for the district attorney, Les Ashton, but wants to become a prosecutor in court. Frustrated, she leaves Les to work for lawyer Bill Crane, whose unhappy wife Marsha, a photographer, makes large bets with bookie Johnny Lacka and openly flirts with model Peggy's husband.

Les is in love with Chris and wants her back. He fools Bill into believing Marsha wants to reconcile, but instead Paul Marvin turns up, telling Bill he and Marsha have become romantically involved. Marsha then is found dead. Les and the police naturally suspect Bill.

Lacka refuses to pay the $20,000 that Marsha won with her bet. Peggy is then killed. At a party, Chris convinces her guests to take one of her lie detector tests. From the answers she gets, she deduces that Paul is the killer behind it all. She is saved from being his next victim by Les, with whom she is now in love.

== Cast ==
- Bonita Granville as Christine Allen
- Morgan Conway as Dist. Atty. Lester Ashton
- Rita Corday as Peggy
- Don Douglas as Paul Marvin
- June Clayworth as Marsha Crane
- Edward Norris as William Ames Crane
- Gerald Mohr as Johnny Lacka
- Michael St. Angel as Hank
- Tommy Noonan as Jonesy
