= Dummy Ache =

1936 film

- Directed by: Leslie Goodwins
- Written by: Leslie Goodwins; Charles E. Roberts
- Produced by: Lee S. Marcus
- Starring: Edgar Kennedy; Florence Lake
- Edited by: Edward Mann
- Distributed by: RKO Pictures
- Release date: July 10, 1936
- Running time: 18 minutes
- Country: United States
- Language: English

Dummy Ache is a 1936 American short comedy film directed by Leslie Goodwins. It was nominated for an Academy Award at the 9th Academy Awards in 1936 for Best Short Subject (Two-Reel). The Academy Film Archive preserved Dummy Ache in 2013. It is a remake of Dumb Daddies (1928), a silent short comedy produced by Hal Roach Studios, starring Max Davidson, featuring Kennedy in a supporting role as a policeman.

== Plot ==
Florence Kennedy has arranged a rehearsal for a part in a play for an amateur dramatic society at a fellow actor's home, but wishes to keep it secret from her husband Edgar, who leaves before the rehearsal begins.

Edgar is suspicious about his wife's behaviour and soon afterwards follows to spy on Florence with the help of a friendly cab driver.

The play itself is about a clandestine affair, with Florence appearing as one of the lovers involved, with the man being shot dead, though a dummy replaces the actor in the scene as it is thrown down onto the ground.

Edgar misconstrues this as a real life affair and murder involving Florence while seeing it through a window, and vows to help his wife "to the bitter end," locking her in a large cupboard.

Unaware that the body itself is a prop dummy, Edgar carries it away in a large basket and plans to dispose it to help his wife, still not realising it is a dummy.

After various scrapes with several cops and local townspeople who think he is a murderer and capture him, Florence eventually catches up with Edgar to explain the full story to him, the cops and townspeople, revealing it was a prop dummy used in a rehearsal for a play.

== Cast ==
- Edgar Kennedy as Edgar
- Florence Lake as Florence
- Jack Rice as Florence's brother
- Dot Farley as Florence's brother
- George J. Lewis as the actor
- Lucille Ball as the actress
- Harry Bowen as the cabbie
- Billy Franey as man with pitchfork
- Bobby Burns as bit role (uncredited)
