= Zombies on Broadway =

1945 film by Gordon Douglas

- Theatrical release poster
- Directed by: Gordon Douglas
- Screenplay by: Robert Kent; Lawrence Kimble
- Based on: short story by Robert Faber; Charles Newman
- Produced by: Benjamin Stoloff
- Starring: Alan Carney; Bela Lugosi; Wally Brown; Anne Jeffreys; Sheldon Leonard
- Cinematography: Jack MacKenzie
- Edited by: Philip Martin
- Music by: Roy Webb
- Distributed by: RKO Radio Pictures
- Release date: April 26, 1945 (U.S.)
- Running time: 68 minutes
- Country: United States
- Language: English

Zombies on Broadway (or Loonies on Broadway in the UK) is a 1945 American zombie comedy film directed by Gordon Douglas. It stars RKO's imitation Abbott and Costello, Alan Carney and Wally Brown, as a pair of men who are tasked with finding a real zombie for a zombie-themed nightclub. Sheldon Leonard, as a former mobster turned nightclub owner, and Bela Lugosi, as the mad scientist who created the zombies, also appear.

== Plot ==
Jerry Miles and Mike Strager are employed as Broadway press agents. Their latest idea is to hire a "genuine zombie" for the opening of the Zombie Hut, a new cabaret nightclub owned by gangster Ace Miller that will open on Friday the 13th of the next month. The boys plan is to dress a former boxer up as a zombie, figuring no one will know the difference. However, Ace's nemesis, Douglas Walker, a Walter Winchell type radio celebrity is friends with the boxer and vows he will publicly humiliate Ace Miller if a real zombie is not at the opening of the club.

The boys are threatened with death unless they produce a real zombie. They discover a lead from a museum curator that a mysterious Professor Renault lives on the Caribbean island of San Sebastian and has been creating zombies. Followed by Ace's henchmen, the boys are immediately placed on a tramp steamer sailing to San Sebastian in the Virgin Islands and ordered to bring a real zombie back or forfeit their lives. Upon arrival they meet the beautiful cabaret singer Jean La Dance. In exchange for her help in locating Professor Renault, Jean wants passage off the island. Miles and Strager eventually meet up with the zombie expert Professor Renault. Unknown to them, the professor's zombie, Kalaga, has captured Jean and brought her to the Professor's secret laboratory, While Miles and Strager investigate the house, Jean awakes to find herself gagged and strapped to a table as the Professor's next test subject. Before he can proceed to give Jean the serum his guard dogs detect intruders. Jean is quickly spirited to a secret dungeon where she is tied up but manages to escape. Strager becomes "zombified" by being under the spell of Renault's secret formula and Miles, Jean and Strager the zombie return home where Miller's henchmen are waiting for them. Convinced that Strager is a real zombie, they bring him to the club. When Strager comes out of his trance, the boys must face the wrath of Ace Miller, a nightclub owner, who is more frightening than anything they've seen yet.

== Cast ==
- Wally Brown as Jerry Miles
- Alan Carney as Mike Strager
- Bela Lugosi as Professor Paul Renault
- Anne Jeffreys as Jean La Danse
- Sheldon Leonard as Ace Miller
- Frank Jenks as Gus
- Russell Hopton as Benny
- Joseph Vitale as Joseph
- Ian Wolfe as Prof. Hopkins
- Louis Jean Heydt as Douglas Walker
- Darby Jones as Kalaga - the Zombie
- Robert Clarke as Wimpy
- Rosemary La Planche as Entertainer in Sarong
- Sir Lancelot as Calypso Singer
- Jason Robards Sr. as Headwaiter
- Nick Stewart as Worthington
- Bill Williams as Smuggler sailor
- Emory Parnell as Ship's Captain

== Production notes ==
Filming lasted from mid-September until early October 1944.

One of the British Virgin Islands named "San Sebastian" in this film is also the name of the island featured in two earlier RKO Val Lewton productions from 1943: I Walked With a Zombie and The Ghost Ship with Sir Lancelot and Darby Jones repeating their roles.

Zombies on Broadway turned in a profit for RKO, which encouraged the studio to re-unite Brown, Carney, Anne Jeffreys and Bela Lugosi for the film Genius at Work in 1946.

== Release ==
The film's premiere took place in New York during the week of April 26, 1945.

== Reception ==
Zombiemania: 80 Movies to Die For author Arnold T. Blumberg wrote that "the only real entertainment value to be had in Zombies on Broadway, apart from spotting connections to I Walked With a Zombie, is derived from the scenes involving the little monkey, who clearly believes he's working on a much better film than everyone else." Writing in The Zombie Movie Encyclopedia, academic Peter Dendle said, "Brown and Carney aren't funny, and it's sad to see Lugosi outwitted by a pack of morons."
