= Live Wires (1946 film) =

1946 film by Phil Karlson

- Directed by: Phil Karlson
- Written by: Dore Schary; Jeb Schary
- Screenplay by: Josef Mischel; Tim Ryan
- Produced by: Jan Grippo; Lindsley Parsons
- Starring: Leo Gorcey; Huntz Hall; Bobby Jordan; William Benedict
- Cinematography: William A. Sickner
- Edited by: Fred Maguire
- Music by: Edward J. Kay
- Distributed by: Monogram Pictures
- Release date: February 12, 1946
- Running time: 64 minutes
- Language: English

Live Wires is a 1946 film starring the comedy team of The Bowery Boys. It is the first film in the series, which lasted until 1958 and included forty-eight films, after the comedy team of the East Side Kids was revamped and renamed The Bowery Boys.

The last entry in the series was In the Money, which was released by Allied Artists in 1958.

== Plot ==
Slip loses job after job due to his quick temper, much to the distress of his sister, Mary. Slip applies for a job with Herbert Sayers, Mary's boss. Slip is sure that he will be an executive but he is ordered to work shovelling dirt on a construction site. He gets in a fight and loses the job. Slip then joins Sach who is working as a skip tracer. His assignment is repossess a car from singer Jeanette, who works at the High Hat Club. Jeanette offers to get Slip a different job with her friends if he agrees to look the other way.

When he arrives at her apartment to meet her friends, he sees a photograph of Sayers, Mary's boss, on a table. Jeanette claims that she and Sayers are no longer involved but Slip is skeptical. Jeanette does not intend to find Slip a job but plots to have him killed. While they are driving to the fatal meeting, Slip manages to repossess her car. Slip is so successful his boss, Barton, asks him and Sach to serve summons on auto thieves, Patsy Clark and Pigeon. Meanwhile, Sayers asks Mary to come to Mexico with him on business. Assuming that Patsy is a woman, Slip sets off to deliver the summons.

Patsy turns out to be a gigantic man. Posing as an employee of Patsy's out-of-town gangster pal, Slip waits for an opportunity either to escape or serve the summons. While he is with Patsy, Slip learns that Pigeon is actually Sayers and is going to Mexico to avoid arrest. Sach and the boys come to Slip's rescue and the fight attracts the police, who arrest Patsy. Slip and the boys rush to the airport to stop Sayers from leaving the country. Mary is so proud of her brother that she punches Jeanette when she makes a disparaging comment about him. Slip is delighted and pronounces his sister "a real Mahoney."

== Cast ==
=== The Bowery Boys ===
- Leo Gorcey as Terrance 'Slip' Mahoney
- Huntz Hall as Sach
- Bobby Jordan as Bobby
- William Benedict as Whitey
- William Frambes as Homer

=== Remaining cast ===
- Pamela Blake as Mary Mahoney
- Claudia Drake as Jeannette
- Mike Mazurki as Patsy Clark
- Patti Brill as Mabel
- John Eldredge as Herbert L. 'Pigeon' Sayers
- Bernard Gorcey as Jack Kane

=== Notes ===
Gorcey's father, Bernard Gorcey, made his first appearance in the series, as a small-time bookmaker. It was not until the next film, In Fast Company where he takes on the role of Louie, the Sweet Shop owner. Louie's Sweet Shop is featured in this film however.

This was Frambes' only film as a Bowery Boy. He had previously played a rival gang member in the East Side Kids film Clancy Street Boys.

== Home media ==
Warner Archives released the film on made-to-order DVD in the United States as part of "The Bowery Boys, Volume One" on November 23, 2012.

Preceded by None	'The Bowery Boys' movies 1946-1958	Succeeded by In Fast Company; 1946
