= The Falcon's Alibi =

1946 film by Ray McCarey

- Theatrical release poster
- Directed by: Ray McCarey; James Anderson (assistant)
- Written by: Paul Yawitz; Dane Lussier; Manuel Seff; Michael Arlen; Edward Dein; Charles O'Neal
- Produced by: William Berke
- Starring: Tom Conway; Rita Corday; Vince Barnett; Jane Greer
- Cinematography: Frank Redman
- Edited by: Philip Martin
- Music by: Ernest Gold
- Production company: RKO Pictures
- Distributed by: RKO Pictures
- Release date: April 22, 1946
- Running time: 61 minutes
- Country: United States
- Language: English

The Falcon's Alibi is a 1946 American mystery film directed by Ray McCarey and starring Tom Conway, Rita Corday and Vince Barnett. It was the ninth film featuring Conway as The Falcon. After the following film, The Falcon's Adventure, the series was ended due to declining popularity.

== Plot ==
After attending a birthday party for the wealthy Gloria Peabody, The Falcon is employed by her secretary to find some missing jewels which she fears she will be blamed for. Before long, a man is murdered, bringing unwelcome police involvement in the case.

== Cast ==
- Tom Conway as Tom Lawrence
- Rita Corday as Joan Meredith
- Vince Barnett as Goldie Locke
- Jane Greer as Lola Carpenter
- Elisha Cook Jr. as Nick
- Emory Parnell as Metcalf
- Al Bridge as Police Inspector Blake
- Esther Howard as Gloria Peabody
- Jean Brooks as Baroness Lena
- Paul Brooks as Alex Olmsted
- Jason Robards Sr. as Harvey Beaumont
- Morgan Wallace as Bender
- Lucien Prival as Baron

== Bibliography ==
- Mayer, Geoff. Historical Dictionary of Crime Films. Scarecrow Press, 2012.
