= Monte Brice =

American film director (1891–1962)

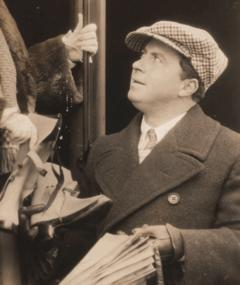
- Born: July 12, 1891; New York City, United States
- Died: November 8, 1962 (aged 71); London, United Kingdom
- Occupations: Writer, producer, director
- Notable work: Brewster's Millions, Tillie's Punctured Romance, You'll Find Out

Monte Brice (July 12, 1891 – November 8, 1962) was an American writer, producer, and director of films.

== Biography ==
Born in 1891 in New York City, Brice wrote his first screenplay in 1920. In 1926, he was promoted from scenario writer to director and given a five-year contract with Famous Players–Lasky. A 1928 article states he had left Paramount Pictures and was freelancing.

In the later years of his decades long career in film, he worked with Bob Hope. Brice was best known as a gag writer who worked on Hope's radio and film scripts.

He married Doris Hill. Brice had two daughters and three grandchildren. He died in London in 1962 while working with Hope on film projects.

== Partial filmography ==
- Riders Up (1924)
- Brewster's Millions (1926), screenplay by Monte Brice, Lloyd Corrigan and Harold Shumate
- Hands Up! (1926), co-written by Monte Brice and Lloyd Corrigan
- Casey at the Bat (1927), director
- Fireman, Save My Child (1927), co-wrote with Thomas J. Geraghty
- Tell It to Sweeney (1927), one of the writers
- Tillie's Punctured Romance (1928), co-wrote with Keene Thompson
- The Fleet's In (1928), one of the writers
- The Plasterers (1929), director
- The Spy (1929), director
- Take a Chance (1933), directed by Monte Brice and Laurence Schwab
- Sweet Surrender (1935), director
- You'll Find Out (1940), one of the writers
- Pot o' Gold (1941), co-wrote screenplay
- Mexican Spitfire Sees a Ghost (1942), written by Charles E. Roberts and Monte Brice
- Mama Loves Papa (1945), writer
- Eadie Was a Lady (1945), original story and screenplay
- Radio Stars on Parade (1945), co-wrote screenplay with Robert E. Kent from a story by Kent
- A Guy, a Gal and a Pal (1945), story
- Genius at Work (1946), co-wrote with Robert E. Kent
- Singin' in the Corn (1946), one of the writers
- Variety Girl (1947), screenplay
