= Tillie's Punctured Romance (1928 film) =

1928 film by A. Edward Sutherland

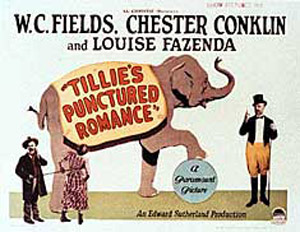
- Theatrical poster
- Directed by: A. Edward Sutherland
- Written by: Monte Brice; Keene Thompson
- Produced by: Al Christie (aka Christie Film Company)
- Starring: W. C. Fields; Louise Fazenda; Chester Conklin; Mack Swain
- Cinematography: Charles P. Boyle; William Wheeler
- Edited by: Arthur Huffsmith
- Distributed by: Paramount Pictures
- Release date: March 3, 1928
- Running time: 57 minutes
- Country: United States
- Language: Silent (English intertitles)

Tillie's Punctured Romance is a 1928 American silent circus comedy film starring W. C. Fields as a ringmaster and Louise Fazenda as a runaway. Written by Monte Brice and Keene Thompson and directed by A. Edward Sutherland, this film has nothing to do with the 1914 Charlie Chaplin film aside from sharing the same title, but Chester Conklin and Mack Swain appear in both films.

== Plot ==
Tillie is a runaway who goes to Frisbee's Colossal Circus, with lions, a ringmaster that wants to take over the circus from the owner, a strong woman, a girl with "a voice of gold and an arm of iron". The group decides to go to the French trenches during World War I in order to entertain the troops, but they all get caught up in a draft and end up serving the German Army as privates while facing the Allies.

== Cast ==
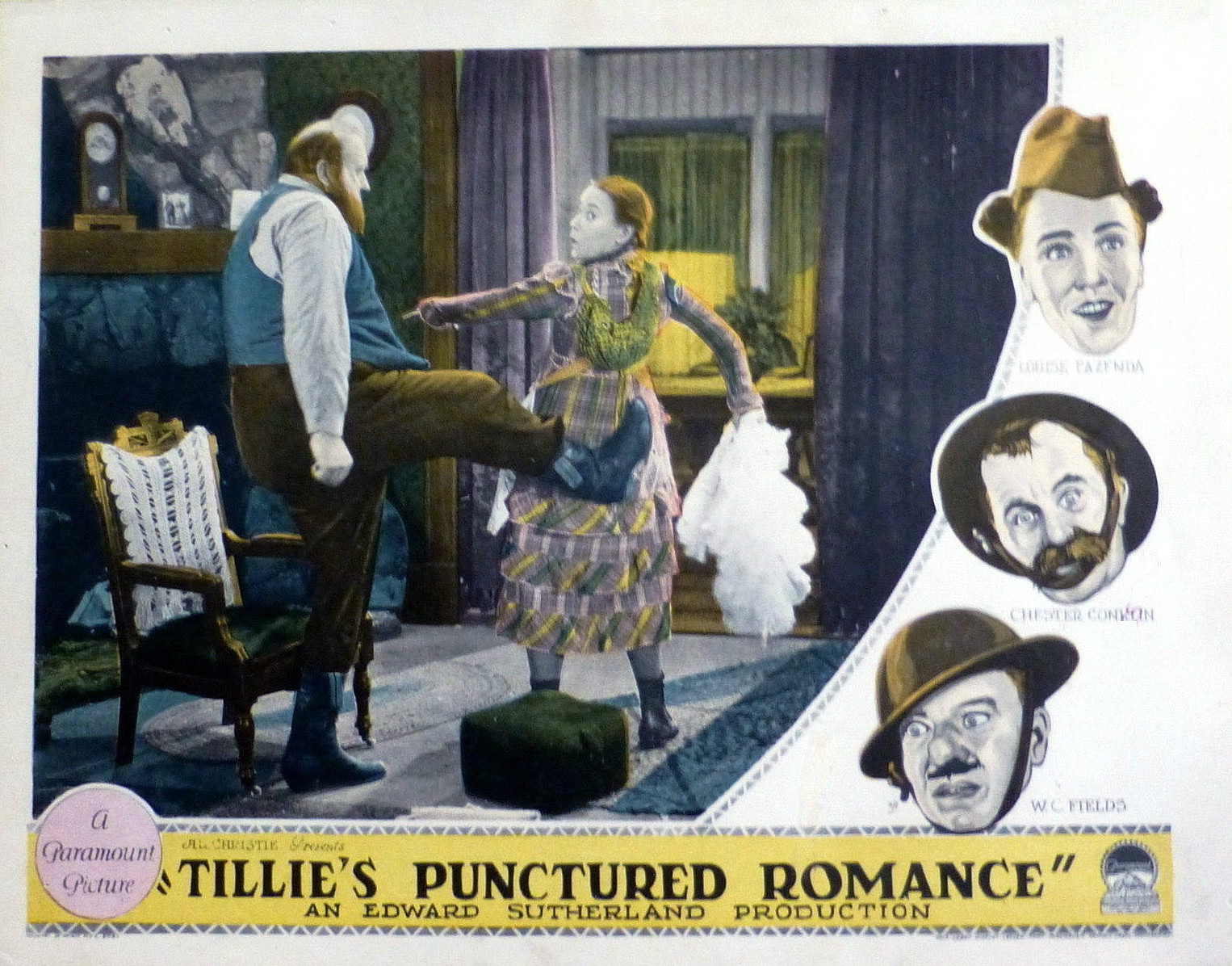
Lobby card

- W. C. Fields as Ringmaster
- Louise Fazenda as Tillie, a Runaway
- Chester Conklin as Circus Owner
- Mack Swain as Tillie's Father
- Doris Hill as Heroine
- Grant Withers as Hero
- Tom Kennedy as Property Man
- Babe London as Strong Woman
- Billy Platt as Midget (credited as William Platt)
- Michael Raffetto as Lion tamer
- Baron von Dobeneck as German officer
- Alfred Adeline
- Tommy Albert
- Agnes Allison
- Joan Marquis

== Preservation ==
With no prints of Tillie's Punctured Romance located in any film archives, it is a lost film.
