= Seven Miles from Alcatraz =

1942 film by Edward Dmytryk

- Film poster
- Directed by: Edward Dmytryk
- Written by: John D. Klorer; Joseph Krumgold
- Based on: unpublished short story by John D. Klorer Sou'West Pass
- Produced by: Herman Schlom
- Starring: James Craig
- Cinematography: Robert De Grasse
- Edited by: George Crone
- Music by: Roy Webb
- Distributed by: RKO Pictures
- Release dates: November 18, 1942 (Premiere-New York City); January 8, 1943 (U.S.)
- Running time: 62 minutes
- Country: United States
- Language: English
- Budget: $134,549

Seven Miles from Alcatraz is a 1942 American action film directed by Edward Dmytryk. The screenplay concerns two prisoners who break out of Alcatraz Federal Penitentiary.

== Plot ==
During World War II, Champ Larkin and Jimbo are cellmates in Alcatraz Federal Penitentiary. Worried about being bombed, they break out and end up washing ashore at a lighthouse on an island. Captain Porter lives there with his daughter Anne, as well as radio signalman Paul Brenner and custodian Stormy. Champ and Jimbo overpower them, find their armory, and hold them hostage.

Because of the war, they allow Paul to continue receiving and transmitting coded messages on the radio. In San Francisco, Baroness Catherine and two other German socialites decode one of the messages with secret orders. Paul will ferry them to a German submarine where they will pass on intelligence they have gathered.

During a blackout, Jimbo and Champ decide to use the darkness to flee the island. Brenner tries to take the lighthouse boat to pick up the spies. Jimbo kills him.

When Brenner misses the rendezvous, the Baroness' cohort heads to the island, knowing its official boat will allow them to get by the naval patrol. They mistake Champ for Brenner, arousing his suspicion. Jimbo realizes the spies have targeting information they will convey to the German submarine. It will allow for precision strikes on San Francisco. The Germans offer the escapees $30,000 and passage to South America on the submarine.

Champ is enthusiastic about the idea. Unaware of the real threat, Anne and Stormy trap Champ and Jimbo in the basement. Champ hides the target information. The Germans get some guns from the armory and try to coerce Champ into returning the intelligence. During a climactic battle, Captain Porter radios the submarine's location to the mainland. The military destroys the submarine.

Anne vows to wait for Champ to finish his prison sentence. The film ends in the warden's office back on Alcatraz as he suggests to Champ and Jimbo that their accidental heroism will greatly reduce their sentences.

== Cast ==
- James Craig as Champ Larkin
- Bonita Granville as Anne Porter
- Frank Jenks as Jimbo
- Cliff Edwards as Stormy
- George Cleveland as Captain Porter
- Erford Gage as Paul Brenner
- Tala Birell as Baroness
- John Banner as Fritz Weinermann
- Otto Reichow as Max

== Production ==
It was Dmytryk's first film for RKO. The movie was originally meant to be directed by Al Rogell. Filming took place between 4–21 August 1942.

Dmytryk called it " Nazi shenanigans in a lighthouse. Good for experimenting with techniques, and I was getting damned sick of it. But at least I was in new territory."

== Reception ==
Variety called it "a tightly-knit smooth-flowing spy meller of moderate budget, that will supply adequate entertainment of its type as secondary feature in the dual houses."
