= Elaine Shepard =

American actress

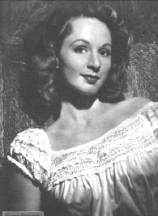
- 1945 pin-up photo from Yank
- Born: Elaine Elizabeth Shepard; April 2, 1913; Olney, Illinois, U.S.
- Died: September 6, 1998 (aged 85); New York City, U.S.
- Occupations: Actor, journalist
- Years active: 1936-1951
- Spouse(s): Terry Hunt (1937-1940); George F. Hartman (1943-1958)

Elaine Elizabeth Shepard (April 2, 1913 – September 6, 1998) was a Broadway and film actress and writer, best known for her performances in the 1930s and 1940s. She was also the author of The Doom Pussy, a semi-fictional account of aviation in the Vietnam War.

== Film and stage ==
Shepard worked as a model on the West Coast before she became active in films. Her first film appearance was in the 1936 Republic serial Darkest Africa, in which she played Valerie Tremaine, the heroine of the film. This was followed with a series of leading roles in other minor films, such as You Can't Fool Your Wife, a 1940 comedy starring Lucille Ball. She then had several minor roles in major films, including playing a secretary in Topper and uncredited roles in Thirty Seconds Over Tokyo and the 1946 Ziegfeld Follies. A more prominent role came in Seven Days Ashore, a musical in which she plays the principal love interest for the band of sailors on shore leave.

Shepard's Broadway credits included performing in the ensemble in Nina Rosa (1931) and portraying Mildred Hunter in Panama Hattie (1940) and a maid in The Land Is Bright (1942).

== Freelance journalism ==
Shepard abandoned acting and turned to freelance journalism, reporting from international trouble spots including the Congo and Northern Ireland. She interviewed international leaders, and in 1959 she was the only female reporter accredited to travel with President Dwight Eisenhower when he toured the Middle East. She is best known in this role for her Vietnam War coverage, which became the basis for her 1967 book The Doom Pussy, recounting her experiences with aviators in the early part of the war.

== Personal life ==
Shepard was married to George Hartmann.

== Films ==
- Darkest Africa (1936) - Valerie Tremaine
- I Cover Chinatown (1936) - Gloria Watkins
- Law of the Ranger (1937) - Evelyn Polk
- The Fighting Texan (1937) - Judy Walton
- Topper (1937) - Secretary
- Night 'n' Gales (1937) (an Our Gang short) - Mrs. Hood, Darla's mother
- Professor Beware (1938) - Anebi (uncredited)
- There Goes My Heart (1938) - Customer (uncredited)
- You Can't Fool Your Wife (1940) - Peggy
- The Falcon in Danger (1943) - Nancy Palmer
- Seven Days Ashore (1944) - Annabelle Rogers
- Thirty Seconds Over Tokyo (1944) - Girl in Officers' Club (uncredited)
- Ziegfeld Follies (1945) - Ziegfeld Girl (uncredited)
- Fiamme sulla laguna (Italian, 1951) - Patricia (Last appearance)

== Books ==
- Forgive Us Our Press Passes (Prentice-Hall, 1962)
- The Doom Pussy (Trident Press, 1967)
- The Doom Pussy II (Rockoon Press, 1992)
