= Fiamme sulla laguna =

- Distributed by: Variety Distribution
- Release date: 15 November 1951
- Country: Italy
- Language: Italian

Fiamme sulla laguna is a 1951 Italian melodrama film.

== Plot ==
A diver from the Venice Arsenal accidentally dies during a dive ordered by the admiral. Anna, the diver's only daughter, accepts the hospitality of an old friend of the family, Antonio, whose worker son immediately falls in love with her. During her funeral, however, Anna meets Luciano, a young officer and son of the admiral; a sympathy arises between the two, but one evening Anna sees the officer at the port exchanging affections with a stranger before leaving for a mission at sea. Believing herself betrayed, she decides out of spite to give in to the advances of the worker, but Luciano, returned from the mission, persuades her to come back with him, proving that he has not betrayed her. Meanwhile, Antonio, seeing his son first deluded and then humiliated by Anna's turnaround, asks the admiral for an audience and protests with him revealing what had happened. The admiral summons the girl and, after having severely reprimanded her, informs her of the decision to prevent her wedding with Luciano. Anna, running home distraught, spots a burning ship. In agreement with Luciano, she goes aboard the ship and she and him die in the fire.

== Cast ==
- Leonardo Cortese
- Lea Padovani
- Sandro Ruffini
- Ermanno Randi
- Tina Pica
- Lauro Gazzolo
- Elaine Shepard
