= The Exile (1947 film) =

1947 film by Max Ophüls

- Directed by: Max Ophüls (as Max Opuls)
- Written by: Douglas Fairbanks Jr.
- Based on: His Majesty, the King: Being the Chronicle of Certain Hours, in the Ill-Starred Life of Charles the Second of England, During the Period of His Exile in Flanders with Those of the Faithful That Fled from the Despot, Oliver Cromwell, the Which Have Received of on Account in the History of His Time; 1926 novel by Cosmo Hamilton
- Produced by: Douglas Fairbanks Jr.
- Starring: Douglas Fairbanks Jr. María Montez; Rita Corday (as Paule Croset)
- Cinematography: Franz Planer
- Edited by: Ted J. Kent
- Music by: Frank Skinner
- Production company: The Fairbanks Company
- Distributed by: Universal-International Pictures
- Release date: October 17, 1947 (U.S.)
- Running time: 95 or 89 minutes
- Country: United States
- Language: English
- Budget: $1,774,990

The Exile is a 1947 American historical adventure romantic film directed by Max Ophüls, and produced, written by, and starring Douglas Fairbanks Jr. French actress Rita Corday (billed as "Paule Croset") played the romantic interest. According to Robert Osborne, the primary host of Turner Classic Movies, María Montez had a stipulation in her contract that she had to have top billing in any film in which she appeared, so her name comes first in the opening credits, despite her secondary role. The film is based on the 1926 novel His Majesty, the King: A Romantic Love Chase of the Seventeenth Century by Cosmo Hamilton.

== Plot ==
In 1660, Charles Stuart, deposed as king of England by Oliver Cromwell and the Roundheads, is in exile in the Netherlands with a few loyalists, awaiting the right opportunity to return. Whilst bartering in a local marketplace, he meets Katie, a Dutch farm owner and flower seller.

When unrest in England presents both opportunity and danger, Charles's chief advisor, Sir Edward Hyde, recommends he hide somewhere, neither too close for Roundhead assassins to find him, nor too far for news to reach him of further developments. Charles, without revealing his royal identity, persuades Katie to take him on as a farm hand. The two soon fall in love.

During his stay, Charles encounters an actor named Dick Pinner who is posing as him; the imposter stays at Katie's inn. Shortly afterward, there arrives another guest, Countess Anabella de Courteuil, an old lover of Charles's and an emissary from King Louis of France. She presents Charles with a gift from Louis, a music box. Knowing that Katie owes 3000 guilders to her cousin, Jan, Charles has the music box sold and pays off the debt without her knowledge. Katie becomes jealous of Anabella and dismisses Charles. However, when she learns of his generosity from a gracious, departing Anabella, she takes him back.

Meanwhile, English Colonel Ingram has been given the mission of assassinating the king. He tracks Charles to his hiding place. Charles escapes from Ingram's men, but they follow Katie and trap him in a windmill. After a sword fight, he kills Ingram, and his followers come to the rescue. Sir Edward informs him that Parliament has offered him back his throne. To take the crown, however, Charles has to leave Katie; Charles resists the idea, but Sir Edward reminds him of his duty, and Katie of what he can do for his people, and the two star-crossed lovers sadly part.

The film's original ending, preferred by Ophüls, was a bit longer than the one shown in the United States. The shorter version ends with Charles leaving for England, while the longer has a further scene in which two courtiers casually discuss a plaque that is erected to his stay.

== Cast ==
- Douglas Fairbanks Jr. as Charles Stuart (Charles II of England)
- Maria Montez as Countess Anabella de Courteuil
- Rita Corday ("Paule Croset") as Katie
- Henry Daniell as Colonel Ingram
- Nigel Bruce as Sir Edward Hyde
- Robert Coote as Dick Pinner
- Otto Waldis as Jan
- Eldon Gorst as Seymour
- Milton A. Owen as Wilcox
- Colin Keith-Johnston as Captain Bristol
- Ben H. Wright as Milbanke
- Colin Kenny as Ross
- Peter Shaw as Higson
- Will Stanton as Tucket
- C.S. Ramsey-Hill [sic] as Cavalier Official
- Lumsden Hare as Roundhead General
- Lester Matthews as Robbins
- Thomas P. Dillon as Jasper
- William Trenk as Footman
- Fred Cavens as Coachman
- Alla Dunn as Marie
- Torben Meyer as Sea Captain
- Grayce Hampton as First Court Lady
- Mary Forbes as Second Court Lady
- Charles Stevens as Painter
- Harry Cording as Roundhead (uncredited)

== Source material ==
The film was based on a novel by Cosmo Hamilton called His Majesty, the King. It was written in 1926. The same year Hamilton announced he had written a play version for production by the Dramatist Theatre.

== Production ==
=== Development ===
In January 1941, it was announced Fairbanks had bought the screen rights to a novel and would appear in a film based it, which he would make with Hal Roach. Fairbanks, Jr., a well-known Anglophile, sought to make the film as a tribute to his father Douglas Fairbanks, a star of swashbuckler films of the silent period.

Plans to make it were interrupted by Fairbanks' service in World War II. In January 1946 he announced he would star in and produce a film version called The Exile as part of a three-picture deal between International Pictures and Fairbanks' production company, the Fairbanks Company, which he had formed with Clarence Erickson. Fairbanks would produce all three – the others were an adaptation of Terry and the Pirates, and a film called Happy Go Lucky. Finance would be provided by International who would also arrange facilities at Universal studios and The Exile would be distributed by United World.

In July 1946 Robert Coote signed to play a support role. In November 1946, Clemence Dane was reportedly doing work on the script.

"When people ask me if I'm following in my father's footsteps, I tell them his footsteps were so light they didn't leave a trace", said Fairbanks. "The proof of it is that his pictures were so carefully tailored to him that no remakes by others have ever been entirely successful. Still I find myself drifting back to the kind of roles he played – by public demand, as it were... However my stunting is more of a piece de resistance than the thing itself, if you get what I mean. Now that I have my own company I'll probably go in for the swashbuckling type of thing. I'm not necessarily wedded to it; our stories will be of varied dramatic content, but I find that I can whip up more enthusiasm for those of a romantic and slightly fantastic nature, like The Exile."

This was Ophüls' first film in Hollywood, after he was fired from his initial project, Vendetta, due to disagreements with producer Howard Hughes. Ophüls was recommended to Fairbanks by Robert Siodmak, the well-known director at the time of The Killers. Fairbanks signed Ophus in December 1946. "He needed the money desperately to get back to Europe and was a most interesting director", said Fairbanks.

The film was going to star a newcomer, Paule Croset. In April 1947, Maria Montez was borrowed from Universal for a relatively small part. Press reports at the time said this was done at Montez's request over Universal's objections.

The film was produced by Universal-International Pictures, and while the initial plan was for the film to be made in Technicolor, budget constraints meant that the movie had to be shot in black and white.

=== Shooting ===
Filming started in May 1947. Though the studio was initially concerned by Ophüls unorthodox filming methods, preferring to film in long takes full of complex camera movements, they eventually warmed to his filmmaking techniques and formed a good relationship. Due to this being his first American film, Ophüls was paid $22,600, compared to the usual $75,000 or more that established Hollywood directors commanded.

The bulk of the film was shot on a large set created by Howard Bay. "This is not a realistic set", he said, "but a romantic one fashioned to fit the mood of the story. We aimed at the picturesque rather than scenes from the workaday world; the exaggeration is deliberate."

Fairbanks later said the film was one of his favorites. "It should have been done in color but we ran out of money and Universal forced Maria Montez on us. But I love it.

=== Maria Montez billing issue ===
Under her contract with Universal, Montez was normally entitled to top billing in a film. She agreed to accept second billing for The Exile but changed her mind and wanted top billing, and wound up suing for $250,000 in damages. Universal had agreed to give Fairbanks top billing so deferred the issue to court. A judge put a temporary stop on any billing until the issue was resolved. In December Montez's lawyer Greg Bautzer announced the matter had been settled out of court. Montez would receive first billing and in equal size font to Fairbanks. (In the end credits would read "Starring Maria Montez, Henry Daniell, Nigel Bruce, Robert Coote and introduces Paule Croset with Douglas Fairbanks".) Montez also received a payout rumored to have been between $15,000 and $30,000.

In August 1947 Universal elected not to pick up its option on Montez's services for the following year, making her freelance.

== Reception ==
The film initially performed well at the box office, but then suffered after the release of Captain from Castile and wound up losing money. Terry and the Pirates and Happy Go Lucky were never made.
