= The Adventures of a Rookie =

1943 film by Leslie Goodwins

- Directed by: Leslie Goodwins
- Written by: William Bowers; M. Coates Webster
- Screenplay by: Edward James
- Produced by: Bert Gilroy
- Starring: Wally Brown; Alan Carney
- Cinematography: Jack MacKenzie
- Edited by: Harry Marker
- Music by: C. Bakaleinikoff
- Distributed by: RKO Radio Pictures
- Release date: August 20, 1943 (U.S.)
- Running time: 64 minutes
- Country: United States
- Language: English

Adventures of a Rookie is a 1943 American comedy film directed by Leslie Goodwins. It was the debut of RKO's comedy duo Carney and Brown. A sequel, Rookies in Burma (1943), followed.

== Plot ==
Three young men from completely different levels of society get their draft notices the same day. Jerry Miles works as an MC on a nightclub, Mike Strager drives a truck for a living and Bob Prescott is the heir of a wealthy family. The three men all report for military duty, and are measured to get uniforms as well as tested for aptitude. Bob scores somewhat higher than the other two and is assigned to be in charge of the men during the bus drive to boot camp. Bob's uniform is all covered in mud, splashing up from a passing car, driven by the cute Peggy Linden.

Jerry and the slow-witted Mike manage to get pushed off the bus and are left behind. When the rest of the group finally arrive at the camp, Bob sees his hopes of entering officer training school vanish when he meets the colonel, who is Bob's commanding officer as well as uncle. The colonel gives Bob a scolding for the loss of two men on the ride there and for wearing a dirty uniform.

Nonetheless, the three recruits are soon granted a six-hour pass, and are invited by Peggy to join her and five of her girl friends for a turkey dinner at the Linden house. The evening passes without mishaps, until Bob is about to return to the base, when Dr. Potts arrives. The doctor has been called upon on account of Hilda, the Lindens' cook. The doctor diagnoses Hilda with a case of scarlet fever, and the doctor goes on to quarantine the house for two whole weeks.

Bob calls the base to report the news. Sgt. Burke, who is his platoon leader, arrives to the house to investigate, and when he thoughtlessly enters he is quarantined with the rest of the men. However, Burke is determined not to let a quarantine interfere with the training of his men, so he leads exercises with his men in maneuvers up and down the stairs and throughout the house.

A few days later the doctor returns to the Linden house to examine Hilda again. He announces that he has misdiagnosed her and lifts the quarantine. The recruits can go back to the base, but when they arrive back to the camp they are immediately sent out on a harsh thirty-day field exercise. Burke orders Bob, Mike and Jerry to march away twelve miles to their field base. The three men decide to save some time by hitching a ride with a convoy. They are however totally unaware that the convoy they hike with is actually bound for San Francisco. They fall asleep and are in for surprise as they wake up, and are ordered to join the troops being shipped overseas to take part in the war.

The men soon find themselves AWOL on an ocean-bound freight boat. They put their heads together once more, and decide on using the ship's cargo nets to swing back to the docks before the ship leaves the harbor. The net jams, and they fall into the water. They find themselves being of some use, as they get to pick up a whole briefcase of dispatches that somehow had fallen overboard.

The three men are considered heroes for saving the dispatches, but after the swim they're hospitalized. Lying in the hospital the receive news that none other than General Ames is coming to personally thank them. They do realize that if the general discovers they are AWOL, Bob will never be admitted to officer training school. To avoid this Bob insists that they sneak out of the hospital before the general arrives. The nurses see them trying to escape, and call for the M.P.'s. The three men are caught and sent back to their unit at the camp.

To hide the fact that they are AWOL, Jerry suggests they should say that they were lost on their march to the field camp. They get help from Peggy, who drives them to a deserted ravine, where they are found by Burke and taken to the colonel. Burke tells the colonel that he saw Peggy drop the three men off at the ravine, the colonel orders the trio jailed. When their company prepares to ship out, Jerry and Mike are released and commanded to follow Burke. The colonel gets a letter written by General Ames, where the men's heroics are explained. The colonel forgives Bob, who then abandons his pursuit of officer training school to join his friends, as they are being shipped overseas to the war.

== Cast ==
- Wally Brown as Jerry Miles
- Alan Carney as Mike Strager
- Richard Martin as Bob Prescott
- Erford Gage as Sgt. Burke
- Margaret Landry as Peggy Linden
- Patti Brill as Patsy
- Rita Corday as Ruth
- Robert Andersen as Sgt Wilson
- John Hamilton as Colonel Wilson
- Jack Baron as Colonel
- Ruth Lee as Mrs. Linden
- Lorraine Krueger as Eve
- Henry Roquemore as Dr. Potts
- Stanley Andrews as General Ames

== Reception ==
=== Box office ===
The film made a profit of $198,000.

=== Critical ===
Kine Weekly wrote: "The crazy tale does not exactiy overflow with original gags and situations, but Wally Brown and Alan Carney, a new and resourceful comedy team, make the most of its wholesome chestnuts. What is more, its many clean laughs are set in a convincing atmosphere. ... Wally Brown and Alan Carney are not yet in the Bud Abbott and Lou Costello class, but nevertheless, get many laughs as Jerry and Michael. Richard Martin is a sound stooge as Bob, and Margaret Landry is easy on the eyes as Peggy. The stars squeeze a number of new gags out of the familiar rookie routine, and these, plus the evergreen old ones, tot up to lively broad comedy entertainment."

The Daily Film Renter wrote: "Wally Brown and Alan Carney make a team at least as amusing as most of the double-act funny men. Pretty girls and a series of diverting situations complete an hour's continuous smile. ... Adequate acting by all concerned and clever direction, all go to make pleasant entertainment for comedy fans and a riot for supporters of the Abbott-Costello type."

== External list ==
- Adventures of a Rookie at IMDb
- The Adventures of a Rookie at the TCM Movie Database (archived)
