= I Cover Chinatown =

1936 American crime film directed by Norman Foster

- Directed by: Norman Foster
- Written by: Harry Hamilton
- Produced by: Fenn Kimball
- Starring: Norman Foster; Elaine Shepard; Theodore von Eltz
- Cinematography: James V. Murray; Arthur Reed
- Edited by: Carl Pierson
- Music by: Abe Meyer
- Production company: Banner Pictures
- Distributed by: Commodore Pictures
- Release date: October 1, 1936
- Running time: 64 minutes
- Country: United States
- Language: English

I Cover Chinatown is a 1936 American crime film directed by Norman Foster (in his directorial debut) and starring Foster, Elaine Shepard and Theodore von Eltz. A San Francisco Chinatown tour guide gets mixed up with a murder. It was Foster's debut as a director and one of his final appearances as an actor.

== Cast ==
- Norman Foster as Eddie Barton
- Elaine Shepard as Gloria Watkins
- Vince Barnett as Puss McGaffey - the Bus Driver
- Theodore von Eltz as Clark Duryea
- Arthur Lake as Insurance Salesman
- Polly Ann Young as Myra Duryea
- Eddie Gribbon as Truck Driver
- Edward Emerson as Victor Duryea
- George Hackathorne as Head Waiter
- Bruce Mitchell as Police Detective
- Robert Love as Policeman
- Charita Alden as Rae - Hawaiian Dancer

== Impact ==
In his 1973 book, B Movies, film historian Don Miller noted that, for an independent (non-studio) production, I Covered Chinatown "showed a bit of class, rare then," and led directly to Foster's contract with 20th Century-Fox and his later notable career as a film director.

== Bibliography ==
- Pitts, Michael R. Poverty Row Studios, 1929–1940: An Illustrated History of 55 Independent Film Companies, with a Filmography for Each. McFarland & Company, 2005.
