= Patti Brill =

American actress

- Patti Brill, from a 1940 newspaper
- Born: Patricia Eloise Brilhante; March 8, 1923; San Francisco, California
- Died: January 18, 1963; North Hollywood, California
- Occupations: Actress; dancer; singer

Patti Brill (March 8, 1923 – January 18, 1963), born Patricia Eloise Brilhante, was an American actress, singer, and dancer.

== Early life and education ==
Brill was born in San Francisco, the daughter of Manuel Perry Brilhante and Warrena Joan Owen Her father was from Hawaii.

== Career ==
Brill was a child model, toured in a stage show called "Meet the People" as a teen, and became a Hollywood starlet during World War II. She went overseas with the USO to entertain American troops. "Her elfin face and figure, her wide eyes and spirited wit, set her apart from the general run of glamour gals," reported a 1943 profile. In 1951 she headlined in a national tour of It's a Great Day, a variety show that included wheelchair users doing physical stunts and dance acts.

Brill appeared in films including The Adventures of a Rookie (1943), The Seventh Victim (1943), The Falcon and the Co-eds (1943), Girl Rush (1944), Nevada (1944), Music in Manhattan (1944), He Forgot to Remember (1944), The Falcon Out West (1944), The Enchanted Cottage (1945), Sing Your Way Home (1945), Live Wires (1946), Hard Boiled Mahoney (1947), and Kilroy Was Here (1947). She appeared on television in episodes of Let There Be Stars (1949) and The Donna Reed Show (1960).

== Personal life ==
Brill married four times. Her first husband was dancer William Harold "Red" Knight; they married in 1943 and later divorced. Her second husband was Hugo Edward Fredlund, a disabled veteran of World War II; they married in 1950 and divorced in 1955. Her third husband was drummer Max Egbert Albright; they married in 1955 and he died from a heart attack in 1959. Her last husband was Perry Rigsby Osborne; they married in 1961. She died from a drug overdose (classed as suicide) in 1963, at the age of 39, in North Hollywood.
