= You Can't Fool Your Wife =

- Theatrical release poster
- Directed by: Ray McCarey
- Screenplay by: Jerome Cady
- Based on: The Romantic Mr. Hinklin by Richard Carroll; Ray McCarey
- Produced by: Cliff Reid
- Starring: Lucille Ball; James Ellison; Robert Coote; Virginia Vale; Emma Dunn; Elaine Shepard
- Cinematography: J. Roy Hunt
- Edited by: Theron Warth
- Music by: Roy Webb
- Production company: RKO Pictures
- Distributed by: RKO Pictures
- Release date: May 21, 1940
- Running time: 68 minutes
- Country: United States
- Language: English

You Can't Fool Your Wife is a 1940 American comedy film directed by Ray McCarey and written by Jerome Cady. The film stars Lucille Ball, James Ellison, Robert Coote, Virginia Vale, Emma Dunn and Elaine Shepard. The film was released on May 21, 1940, by RKO Pictures.

== Plot ==
Young married couple Andrew Hinklin and Clara Hinklin née Fields, were college sweethearts, but they have started to feel that their lives are unexciting and unmotivated. Their marriage is not helped by Clara's opinionated mother living with them in their small one-bedroom apartment. Clara wishes that their life would be a little more exciting as Andrew said on their honeymoon that their married life would be. Her wish takes an unexpected turn when Andrew, at work, is assigned to show the visiting Mr. Battingcourt Jr. - the younger half of the head of their London office and who is the majority shareholder of their accounting firm - a good time while he's in the US. "Batty" as he is affectionately called by his friends is a party animal, and Andrew, who Batty rechristens "Hinky", feels he has to party along all in the name of job security.

Clara feels that she is losing her stable husband Andrew to Hinky the party animal. Due to a misunderstanding with some "figures" at the office, they become separated. Clara's mother does her best to make sure the couple isn't able to talk with each other. Feeling he is partly to blame for the Hinklins' marital problems, Batty advises Clara that she can make herself more exciting to Hinky by changing her demeanor and appearance, more like Mercedes Vasquez, a beautiful and exciting woman. Clara agrees to Batty's plan to come to one of their parties masquerading as exotic Latina Dolores Alvaradez, to woo Hinky and thus ultimately show him that she can be exotic like he probably now wants. Complications ensue when others find out about Batty's scheme and when Mercedes Vasquez, who looks extremely alike to Clara, also attends that party leading to a few mistaken identities.

== Cast ==
- Lucille Ball as Clara Fields Hinklin / Mercedes Vasquez
- James Ellison as Andrew 'Hinkie' Hinklin
- Robert Coote as 'Batty' Battincourt
- Virginia Vale as Sally
- Emma Dunn as Mother Fields
- Elaine Shepard as Peggy
- William Halligan as J.R. Gillespie, Sr.
- Oscar O'Shea as Dr. Emery, Colony College Chaplain
- Norman Mayes as Porter at Dock
- Patsy O'Byrne as Hotel Maid
- Charlie Hall as Ritz Amsterdam Bellboy
- Dell Henderson as Ritz Amsterdam Manager
- Harrison Greene as Sullivan, the House Detective
- Hobart Cavanaugh as Potts, GBG & P Vice President
- Walter Sande as Mr. Gillespie, Jr.
- Walter Fenner as Walker
- Irving Bacon as Lippincott, GBG & P Clerk

== Production ==
John Farrow briefly took over direction during the shoot when director McCarey fell ill.
