= Alan Carney =

American actor (1909–1973)

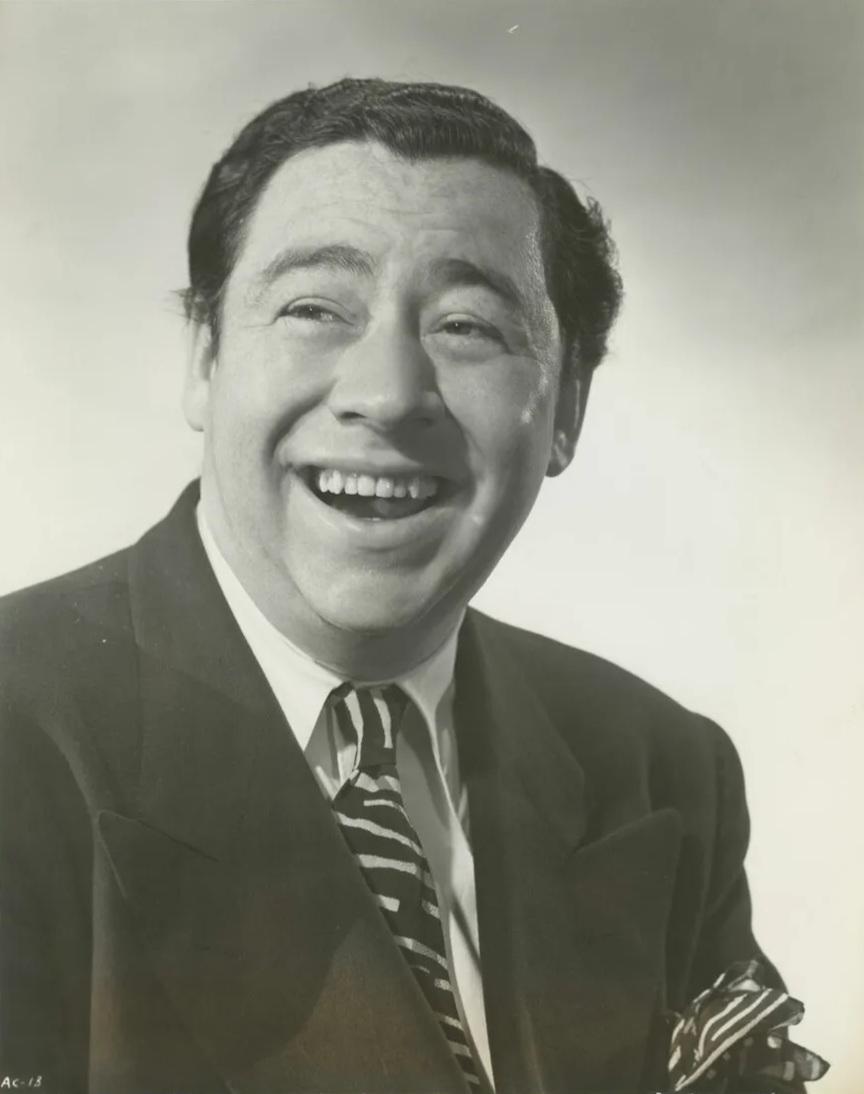
- Carney in Mr. Lucky (1943)
- Born: David John Boughal; December 22, 1909; Manhattan, New York City, U.S.
- Died: May 2, 1973 (aged 63); Los Angeles, California, U.S.
- Occupations: Actor; comedian
- Years active: 1941–1973
- Spouse(s): Elinor D. Miller (m. 1936; div. between 1947 and 1953)

Alan Carney (born David John Boughal; December 22, 1909 – May 2, 1973) was an American actor and comedian.

== Early life and career ==
Born David John Boughal in Manhattan on December 22, 1909, (Note: The actor's own resumé gave his real surname as Bougal and his birthdate as December 22, 1911.)) Carny was the youngest of four children born to Irish immigrants Ellen "Nellie" (née Kearney) and Edward Francis Boughal. At some point between 1920 and 1929, the family relocated to Brooklyn.

Upon finishing high school, Boughal began working in his father's print shop. Despite this fact, and despite his father's clearly expressed wishes, following in the latter's footsteps was never his intention. Instead, he hoped to become an actor. He began imitating customers of the shop, much to their dismay. He eventually appeared in an amateur night program, which resulted in his being added to a vaudeville act at Proctor's Theater in Yonkers, New York. By this time, the aspiring performer had traded in his potentially problematic birth name for a slightly Americanized version of his mother's maiden name. When the show's headliner, Marion Eddy, went on tour, it was Alan Carney that accompanied her.

After performing in vaudeville for several years, Carney made the transition from stage to screen in 1943, (Note: The issue of exactly when and in which film Carney made his motion picture debut has long been muddied by one critical error made at the time of his death by several of the nation's most widely trusted news sources at the time (namely, United Press International, both the east and west coast papers of record, plus the publication often dubbed the entertainment industry's "trade paper of record"), all of whom, in their respective obits, erroneously—and prominently—credit the late actor with appearances in two wholly British-made, early-forties wartime productions, 1940's Convoy and 1942's famously Noël Coward-penned, David Lean-filmed flag-waver, In Which We Serve, both of which in fact feature the like-named British comic character actor, George Carney.) in the RKO Radio Pictures production, Gildersleeve's Bad Day. As to how exactly this came to pass, there are at least two slightly varying published accounts, both involving Carney's discovery by film producer David Hempstead. The first, published in March 1943 by the St. Louis Post Dispatch, maintains that Hempstead, by mere happenstance, had caught Carney's act at the Crystal Terrace Room of St. Louis's Park Plaza Hotel and been sufficiently impressed to leave both his calling card and a standing invitation to come visit him in Hollywood, adding that Carney had eventually taken Hempstead up on the offer, leading to an extended RKO contract, and eventually his breakthrough performance as Cary Grant's bodyguard "Crunk" in the 1943 romantic comedy, Mr. Lucky. (Note: The second account, published just prior to Mr. Lucky's release, maintains that their initial encounter was in fact arranged by RKO talent scout Arthur Willi, and promptly made Carney "the answer to producer David Hempstead's prayer for a hoodlum with a soul.")

1943 also saw the pairing of Carney with comic Wally Brown as RKO's answer to Abbott and Costello. In addition to their inexpensive starring vehicles, Brown and Carney co-starred in Step Lively, a musical remake of the Marx Brothers film Room Service, featuring George Murphy in the "Groucho" role, with Brown & Carney as his assistants. The comedy team was also featured on a live USO tour arranged by the studio.

After 1946's Genius at Work, RKO terminated the team's contracts. Alan Carney continued in films and television as a supporting player, working prolifically for Walt Disney the 1960s and 1970s. One of Carney's best latter-day roles was as Mayor Dawgmeat in the 1959 musical film Li'l Abner. On television he played Harry Nolan in "Have Gun Will Travel" S1 E32 "The Five Books of Owen Deaver" which aired 4/25/1958.

Carney appeared with Wally Brown in Who Was That Lady? (1960) and in Walt Disney's The Absent-Minded Professor (1961), but they never appeared in the same scenes together. The duo was slated to be reunited for It's a Mad, Mad, Mad, Mad World (1963), but Brown died not long before filming began.

Carney made his last film appearance in Walt Disney Productions' Herbie Rides Again, released in 1974 after his death.

== Personal life and death ==
In 1936, Carney married Elinor D. Miller. They divorced sometime between 1947 and 1953.

Carney died in Van Nuys, California, on May 2, 1973, at age 63, from a heart attack brought on by the excitement of winning the daily double at Hollywood Park Racetrack.

== Filmography ==
- Gildersleeve's Bad Day (1943) as Toad
- Mr. Lucky (1943) as Crunk
- Mexican Spitfire's Blessed Event (1943) as Navajo Room Bartender
- The Adventures of a Rookie (1943) as Mike Strager
- Gangway for Tomorrow (1943) as Swallow
- Around the World (1943) as Joe Gimpus
- Rookies in Burma (1943) as Mike Strager
- Seven Days Ashore (1944) as Orval 'Handsome' Martin
- Step Lively (1944) as Harry
- Girl Rush (1944) as Mike Strager
- Zombies on Broadway (1945) as Mike Strager
- Radio Stars on Parade (1945) as Mike Strager
- Genius at Work (1946) as Mike Strager
- Vacation in Reno (1946) as Angel
- The Pretender (1947) as Victor Korrin
- Hideout (1949) as Evans
- Rally 'Round the Flag, Boys! (1958) as Bartender / Owner (uncredited)
- Compulsion (1959) as Globe Newspaper Editor (uncredited)
- Li'l Abner (1959) as Mayor Daniel D. Dogmeat
- Who Was That Lady? (1960) as Building Superintendent (uncredited)
- North to Alaska (1960) as Bartender (uncredited)
- Swingin' Along (1961) as Officer Sullivan
- The Absent-Minded Professor (1961) as First Referee
- The Comancheros (1961) as Stillwater Bartender (uncredited)
- Son of Flubber (1963) as Referee
- It's a Mad, Mad, Mad, Mad World (1963) as a sergeant with the Santa Rosita Police Department
- Sylvia (1965) as Gus
- Monkeys, Go Home! (1967) as Grocer
- The Adventures of Bullwhip Griffin (1967) as Joe Turner
- Blackbeard's Ghost (1968) as Bartender
- Flap (1970) as Member of Circus Train (uncredited)
- Wild Rovers (1971) as Palace Bartender
- Herbie Rides Again (1974) as Judge with Cigar at Chicken Run (posthumous release, final film role)
