= Inez Wallace =

American writer and columnist

Inez Wallace (1888 – 1966) was a writer and columnist in the United States. One of her short stories was adapted into the 1943 film I Walked with a Zombie.

== Biography ==
Wallace was a "roving reporter" and entertainment columnist for the Cleveland Plain Dealer from the 1920s until the 1950s. She wrote magazine features and short stories, and was a gossip columnist in Hollywood who interviewed various stars. She was published in Collier's This Week and American Weekly Magazine, the latter from which her story "I Walked with a Zombie" was adapted into the film I Walked with a Zombie (1943).

Wallace published The Inez Wallace Institute of Screen Acting in 1922. She wrote a novel, Shadows in Paradise, about Hollywood life. She also produced her own film, Fate's Daughter, and gave talks at theaters on the film industry.

In 1944, Wallace sought $101,000 in damages in a personal injury suit after the taxicab in which she was riding became involved in an accident. Her friend, actress Mary Pickford, testified on behalf of Wallace, saying she was "highly nervous, distraught and unable to concentrate" after the collision.

Wallace was married to Frank Hubbell, an advertising executive. The Western Reserve Historical Society has a collection of their papers.
