= Mr. Lucky (film) =

1943 film by H. C. Potter

- Film poster
- Directed by: H.C. Potter
- Screenplay by: Milton Holmes; Adrian Scott
- Based on: "Bundles for Freedom"; 1942 story in Cosmopolitan by Milton Holmes
- Produced by: David Hempstead
- Starring: Cary Grant; Laraine Day
- Cinematography: George Barnes
- Edited by: Theron Warth
- Music by: Roy Webb
- Production company: RKO Radio Pictures
- Distributed by: RKO Radio Pictures (US)
- Release dates: May 28, 1943 (US); August 21, 1943 (UK)
- Running time: 100 min.
- Country: United States
- Language: English
- Budget: $842,000
- Box office: $3,485,000

Mr. Lucky is a 1943 romance film directed by H.C. Potter, starring Cary Grant and Laraine Day. It recounts the tale of an attraction between a shady gambler and a wealthy socialite in the days prior to the United States entering World War II.

== Plot ==
Late one winter night, Swede rows up to a public dock in a dinghy. He hides when he spots a young woman who walks to the end of the pier. When a new night watchman (an uncredited Emory Parnell) notices her and fears she is about to jump, Swede stops him from bothering her. The sailor begins recounting her story, and the film segues into a long flashback.

Joe "the Greek" Adams is a gambler and grifter with a couple of problems. First, he and his treacherous partner Zepp have received draft notices to join the army in preparation for World War II. However, one of his underlings, Joe Bascopoulos, has just died, and his status was 4F (unfit to serve). So one of them can dodge the draft by assuming his identity. They gamble for it and their share of their gambling ship; Zepp cheats, but Joe still wins. Zepp fails his physical examination anyway.

The other problem is a lack of money to bankroll his gambling ship. He talks the head of the local War Relief organization, Captain Veronica Steadman, into authorizing him to run a "charity" casino, promising to raise enough money to outfit a relief ship, despite the suspicions of her lieutenant, wealthy socialite Dorothy Bryant.

Eventually, he even charms Dorothy. She tells her snobbish grandfather, to his great dismay, that "Joe's the first man I've ever met I'm afraid of. It's exciting." At one point, Joe teaches Dorothy Australian rhyming slang, for example, "tit for tat" (hat), "twist and twirl" (girl), "storm and strife" (wife). Later, he renames his gambling ship the "Briny Marlin" (darling) in her honor.

On the day of the charity ball, Joe receives a letter addressed to Bascopoulos. Curious, he takes it to a Greek Orthodox priest for translation. It is from Bascopoulos's mother in Axis-occupied Greece. She wrote to tell her son that when German paratroopers landed nearby, under his brothers' leadership every man in their village fought to the death. Moved, Joe reexamines his life.

At the ball, Joe's men use false bottoms in the cashboxes to steal most of the money. Joe has a change of heart and tells his right-hand man, the "Crunk", that the money is going to war relief. But Zepp overhears and forces him at gunpoint to collect the loot. Dorothy accidentally catches them in the act and thinks Joe is a willing participant. To protect her, he is forced to knock her out. Then, the two men start collecting the money. When Zepp briefly looks away, Joe attacks and kills him, but not before getting shot. Joe escapes, leaving behind a trail of blood. Then, he sends the money back to Dorothy via his trusted friend Swede. He loads his ship with the charity's supplies.

Later, Dorothy is stricken when a policeman informs her Bascopoulos is dead. Then she sees the photograph of the man; it is not her Joe. When the name of the ship Bascopoulos worked on is mentioned, she rushes to the dock, just as the ship is leaving for Europe. She begs Joe to take her with him, but he tells her she deserves better and turns away to hide his own anguish. The ship is torpedoed and sunk on the return trip. Dorothy visits the pier each night.

The flashback ends. Hoping Dorothy would be present, Swede arranged for Joe to meet him there. When Joe shows up at the other end of the pier, he wants to go out on the town to celebrate their last night in port rather than going back to their ship. Thinking quickly, the guard tells him he cannot leave the dinghy tied up where it is. The watchman settles who has to move it by flipping a coin, assigning Joe heads; he loses. As Joe walks to the end of the dock, Dorothy sees him and rushes into his arms. Joe is taken aback, but then embraces her. Meanwhile, Swede examines the coin: it has a head on each side.

== Cast ==
- Cary Grant as Joe Adams/"Joe Bascopoulos"
- Laraine Day as Dorothy Bryant
- Charles Bickford as Hard Swede
- Gladys Cooper as Captain Veronica Steadman
- Alan Carney as the "Crunk"
- Henry Stephenson as Mr. Bryant, Dorothy's grandfather
- Paul Stewart as Zepp
- Kay Johnson as Mrs. Mary Ostrander
- Walter Kingsford as Commissioner Hargraves
- Erford Gage as Henchman
- Florence Bates as Mrs. Van Every
- Edward Fielding as Foster, Dorothy's butler (uncredited)
- Emory Parnell as the dock watchman (uncredited)
- Vladimir Sokoloff as the Greek priest (uncredited)

== Reception ==
The film was a success, earning $2,620,000 domestically and $865,000 foreign, and made a profit of $1,603,000.

== Adaptations to other media ==
Mr. Lucky was adapted as a radio play on the October 18, 1943, broadcast of Lux Radio Theatre with Cary Grant and Laraine Day reprising their film roles. It was also presented on the January 20, 1950, broadcast of Screen Directors Playhouse with Cary Grant again reprising his film role.

A 1959 TV series, Mr. Lucky, was supposedly based on this film, but they have virtually nothing in common apart from the fact that the lead character is a gambler and owns a boat. Creator Blake Edwards confirmed that it was reworked from "Dante's Inferno," a recurring element of Four Star Playhouse that he had originated. In any event, despite high ratings, it lasted only one season. It starred John Vivyan in the title role and Ross Martin as his sidekick Andamo. Henry Mancini's theme song became a popular instrumental.
