= Vacation in Reno =

1946 film by Leslie Goodwins

- Directed by: Leslie Goodwins
- Written by: Charles Kerr
- Screenplay by: Charles E. Roberts; Arthur Ross
- Produced by: Leslie Goodwins
- Starring: Jack Haley; Anne Jeffreys; Wally Brown
- Cinematography: George E. Diskant
- Edited by: Les Millbrook
- Music by: Paul Sawtell
- Distributed by: RKO Radio Pictures
- Release date: December 10, 1946 (U.S.)
- Running time: 60 minutes
- Country: United States
- Language: English

Vacation in Reno is a 1946 American comedy film directed by Leslie Goodwins and starring Jack Haley, Anne Jeffreys, Iris Adrian, Wally Brown, Alan Carney, and Morgan Conway.

== Plot ==
Jack Carroll (portrayed by Jack Haley) and his wife (Anne Jeffreys) have an argument about their friends, but when he makes a crack that his mother-in-law is a "fat porpoise," they fight and she leaves him.

Jack runs into two strange men right before they burglarize a bank, leaving Jack to be the only one to identify. Because of this, he takes a vacation to Reno and checks into the Bar Nothing Ranch. Later, the robbers come to Reno and check in. They bury a suitcase of money where Jack plans to find it with his metal detector. Jack finds the money, but is taken by another lady.

This is the beginning of his troubles, where he encounters different men: a sheriff, a sailor, and a gun moll who convinces the police that she is Mrs. Carroll. Jack's wife arrives and Jack is unable to adequately explain things to her before she gets a divorce.

== Cast ==
- Jack Haley as Jack Carroll
- Anne Jeffreys as Eleanor
- Wally Brown as Eddie Roberts
- Iris Adrian as Bunny Wells
- Morgan Conway as Joe
- Alan Carney as Angel
- Myrna Dell as Mrs. Dumont
- Matt McHugh as William Dumont
- Claire Carleton as Sally Beaver
- Jason Robards Sr. as Sheriff
- Matt Willis as Hank the Deputy
