= Who Was That Lady? =

1960 film by George Sidney

- Original film poster
- Directed by: George Sidney
- Written by: Norman Krasna
- Produced by: Norman Krasna
- Starring: Tony Curtis; Dean Martin; Janet Leigh
- Cinematography: Harry Stradling
- Edited by: Viola Lawrence
- Music by: André Previn
- Distributed by: Columbia Pictures
- Release date: April 15, 1960
- Running time: 115 minutes
- Country: United States
- Language: English
- Box office: $3,100,000 (US/Canada rentals)

Who Was That Lady? is a 1960 black and white American comedy film directed by George Sidney and starring Tony Curtis, Dean Martin, and Janet Leigh.

The movie was made by Ansark-Sidney, distributed by Columbia Pictures and produced by Norman Krasna, who also wrote the screenplay based on his successful 1958 Broadway play Who Was That Lady I Saw You With? The costume design was by Jean Louis. The title song was written by Sammy Cahn and Jimmy Van Heusen.

Dean Martin received a Golden Globe Award for Best Actor nomination for his performance in Who Was That Lady?, which also was nominated for Best Comedy.

== Plot ==
Ann Wilson catches her strait-laced husband, Columbia University Assistant Professor of Chemistry David Wilson, kissing another woman. From David's perspective, it was an innocent kiss from a grateful transfer student. Ann, however, wants a divorce. David's friend, TV writer Michael Haney, advises him to convince Ann that he is really an FBI agent and that the kiss was in the name of national security.

Ann falls for it, but is so impressed with what her husband does for a living that she can't keep quiet about it. Michael is so impressed with Ann's gullibility and patriotic urging of her husband Dave to do more "secret missions" that Michael sets up a date with two blondes with the promise of spending a weekend together with them.

The indiscretions cause a number of complications, including some with the real FBI, the CIA and hostile foreign secret agents.

David and Michael end up in the basement of the Empire State Building as it floods. As Ann stands behind David unseen, he confesses why he loves her and all is good again.

== Cast ==
Actor	Role
Tony Curtis	David Wilson
Dean Martin	Michael Haney
Janet Leigh	Ann Wilson
James Whitmore	Harry Powell
John McIntire	Bob Doyle
Barbara Nichols	Gloria Coogle
Larry Keating	Parker
Larry Storch	Orenov
Simon Oakland	Belka
Joi Lansing	Florence Coogle
Mike Lane	Glinka the Henchman

The film features brief, uncredited appearances by actress Cicely Tyson and comedians Wally Brown, Alan Carney, Snub Pollard, Jack Benny and Emil Sitka.

== Original play ==
Who Was That Lady I Saw You With?
- Original language: English
- Written by: Norman Krasna

Premiere
- Date: 3 March 1958
- Place: Martin Beck Theatre, New York

In August 1957, Krasna announced that his play My Wife and I would be produced on Broadway with David Merrick. This became Who Was That Lady I Saw You With? (1958) and was ultimately produced by Leland Hayward. In December 1957, Alex Segal signed on to direct.

The play opened on Broadway at the Martin Beck Theatre on March 3, 1958.

=== Original Broadway cast ===
- Peter Lind Hayes as David Williams
- Mary Healy as Ann Williams
- Ray Walston as Michael Haney
- Roland Winters as Harry Powell
- Larry Storch as Orlov
- Gregory Morton as Belka
- William Swetland as Robert Doyle
- Roxanne Arlen as Gloria Coogle
- Virginia de Luce as Florence Coogle
- Robert Burr as Evans
- Stephen C. Cheng as Waiter
- Pamela Curran as Second Tenant
- Dan Frazer as McCarthy
- Peter Gumeny as Joe Bendix
- Richard Kuen Loo as Lee Wong
- Frank Milan as Parker
- Joan Morgan as Secretary
- W. Edgar Rooney as Building Employee
- Wallace Rooney as Schultz

=== Reception of the play ===
Walter Kerr called the play "an elaborate and extremely funny doodle." Brooks Atkinson of the New York Times said "the actors are more entertaining than the script... the fun gets progressively thinner." The play ran for 208 performances.

It had only three positive reviews but managed to run seven months. Hayward elected not to take the play out touring because he felt as the play involved multiple sets it was too expensive to mount. The play was often revived. A 1965 production in Los Angeles starred Dick Miller.

=== Lawsuit related to the play ===
Krasna was sued for $500,000 in a breach of trust claim by writer Valentine Davies, who contended that Krasna incorporated material from Davies' work Love Must Go On.

Davies died in 1961 but his widow continued the suit asking for $1.5 million. The case went to trial in 1962. Groucho Marx gave evidence where he said he and Krasna worked on the themes of the play in their script The King and the Chorus Girl.

The first trial ended in a deadlocked jury which was discharged after three days. The second trial found for Krasna saying there was no oral agreement between him and Davies.

There was a third trial that ended in Krasna's favor. A judge ordered a fourth trial in 1972 which was dismissed when judge ruled that Davies should have filed a complaint within two years of discovering (he believed) that Krasna used his material.

== Production ==
=== Development ===
In July 1958, Columbia bought the film rights to the play and hired Krasna to write the script. Hedda Hopper wrote that she hoped the three leads of the play were used instead of stars as "they took a play that wasn't that good and turned it into a great hit". However the stars Dean Martin and Tony Curtis were clients of Lew Wasserman of MCA, as was Krasna – Wasserman had packaged the project with his clients and sold it to Columbia for $350,000.

In September 1958 George Sidney announced he would make the film as part of a three-picture deal with Columbia, along with Pepe and Here Come the Brides. The production company, Ansark-Sidney, combines the names of producer Krasna (spelled backwards) and director Sidney.

In March 1959, Debbie Reynolds signed to star alongside Dean Martin and Tony Curtis. Martin's fee at this stage was $200,000 per film. By May, Reynolds had dropped out and been replaced by Janet Leigh, then married to Curtis.

=== Shooting ===
Filming started on July 20, 1959. Shortly after filming Leigh called it "the best role I've ever had. The girl is really important in the comedy. Quite a few important changes were made from the stage play because of the expanded movie medium... We had a real ball making the picture; we played practical jokes on each other between scenes that kept everyone in good humor. That George Sidney's a doll too."

Leigh confirmed in her memoirs that making the film "was a romp from start to finish... we really rolled with this one. The personal familiarity of the three of us allowed absolute freedom and the interplay was wild and woolly and inventive."

George Sidney was so taken with Leigh's performance he signed her to appear in Pepe, Diamond Bikini (not made), and Bye Bye Birdie.

== Reception ==
The film was popular and earned over $3 million at the North American box office.
