= Sir Lancelot (singer) =

- Publicity Photo of Sir Lancelot

Background information
- Born: Lancelot Victor Edward Pinard; March 24, 1902; Cumuto, Trinidad
- Died: March 12, 2001 (aged 98) Anaheim, California, US
- Genres: Calypso
- Occupations: Singer, actor
- Years active: 1940–2001

Lancelot Victor Edward Pinard (March 24, 1902 – March 12, 2001) was a calypso singer and actor who used the name Sir Lancelot. Sir Lancelot played a major role in popularizing calypso in North America, and Harry Belafonte acknowledged him as an inspiration and major influence.

== Early life ==
Pinard was born in Cumuto, Trinidad. His father, Donald Pinard, was a wealthy government official and Anglophile. Pinard attended exclusive parochial schools and his family regularly attended the opera (which gave him an informal musical education). He began singing traditional German lieder and Italian arias. He studied to be a pharmacist as a young man, and his family sent him to New York City to study medicine. After hearing a concert by the African-American lyric tenor Roland Hayes he gave up his medical education to study singing and music, and soon was performing classical works. He began including calypso in his performances, and eventually became a full-time calypso singer. About this time, he met the Trinidadian band leader Gerald Clark, perhaps the most significant promoter of calypso in New York City. Clark asked him to record some calypso songs, and Pinard agreed. He made his debut as Sir Lancelot in 1940 at New York City's Village Vanguard nightclub. He was a close friend of the photographer Seema Aissen Weatherwax, who took some of his first publicity photos.

== Musical and acting career ==
Sir Lancelot became a regular at the Village Vanguard, and by the 1940s "was widely considered the hottest calypsonian in the city." His trademark became the tuxedo he wore in nearly every concert, and his popularity was nationwide for two decades. In the 1940s he returned home for the first time but was largely disowned by his family, which felt that his calypso singing had shamed them. Sir Lancelot wrote the calypso song "Shame & Scandal" (also known as "Fort Holland") in response.

Sir Lancelot toured with Lionel Belasco in California and Oregon in 1941. After a show in Los Angeles, he was offered a minor singing role in the picture Two Yanks in Trinidad (Columbia Pictures, 1942). His appearance was made possible by the Oscar-winning performance of Hattie McDaniel in Gone with the Wind just two years earlier. He made more than 15 films, and his significant film appearances include:

- Happy Go Lucky (1943), where he sang Roaring Lion's 1933 calypso hit, "Ugly Woman."
- I Walked with a Zombie (1943), his first of three films made by the horror producer Val Lewton, as a calypso singer. His "Shame and Scandal" is performed, as is "The British Grenadiers".

- The Ghost Ship (1943), his second Val Lewton film, his first role in which he primarily acted rather than sang.
- The Curse of the Cat People (1944), his third and last Lewton film, as Edward, a butler and cook
- To Have and Have Not (1944)
- Zombies on Broadway (1945)
- Brute Force (1947)
- Romance on the High Seas (1948)

In the 1940s, Sir Lancelot made numerous records (signing with Apollo Records), and sang in commercials. He also composed a score for the 1948 motion picture, Tarzan and the Mermaids. He allegedly made millions of dollars selling calypso records, and spent most of it.

Sir Lancelot was politically active for much of his life. After hearing Henry A. Wallace's "century of the common man" speech on May 8, 1942, Sir Lancelot composed the "Common Man" calypso song. Wallace later wrote him a long letter of thanks. He composed several popular calypso songs with left-wing lyrics in the 1940s, including "Defenders of Stalingrad" and "Walk in Peace" (1946). His stand on war and peace issues was so well known that a cartoon version of him appeared in Columbia Pictures' 1944 animated short film, The Disillusioned Bluebird (in which the calypso-singing character tells a bluebird that the world will not always be at war). According to Pete Seeger, the 1948 Lead Belly song "Equality for Negroes" was inspired by a Sir Lancelot song. Sir Lancelot became a U.S. citizen in 1960.

Sir Lancelot spent six years touring in Europe in the 1950s, which negatively impacted his career in the U.S. Sir Lancelot's last film appearance was in 1958 (with Yul Brynner in The Buccaneer), although he made a noted appearance in an episode of The Andy Griffith Show in 1967. Through the 1960s and into the early 1970s, he recorded several "Gospel calypso" songs. He was widely popular in Europe into the late 1960s. His popularity in the U.S. at the time was still strong enough for Sherwood Schwartz to use Sir Lancelot's musical style as inspiration for the original theme song to the television program Gilligan's Island and nearly had Sir Lancelot sing the theme. His music, too, endured, with Lord Melody covering "Shame and Scandal" in the 1960s. He continued to work as a musician until at least 1973, briefly coming out of retirement in the 1980s to perform at McCabe's Guitar Shop (Los Angeles) with Van Dyke Parks, Ry Cooder and other musicians. He also performed and recorded with Steven Springer, Arizona-based band Sanctuary, and his nephew Brian Pinard, recording his last album under the name "Knights of the Holy Trinity," with his last recording being "Pinardhymns – Religious Calypso."

Sir Lancelot was a Roman Catholic who married and had three daughters. He spent his last years in Australia with his nephew, Brian Pinard.

Sir Lancelot died of natural causes in Anaheim, California and is buried at the Holy Cross Cemetery in Culver City, California.

== Filmography ==
Year	Title	Role	Notes
1942	Two Yanks in Trinidad	Trinidad Man	Film debut, uncredited
1943	Happy Go Lucky	Calypso Singer	
1943	I Walked with a Zombie	Calypso Singer	
1943	The Ghost Ship	Billy Radd	Uncredited
1944	The Curse of the Cat People	Edward	
1944	To Have and Have Not	Horatio – Crewman	Uncredited
1945	Eve Knew Her Apples	Calypso Singer on Radio	Uncredited
1945	Zombies on Broadway	Calypso Singer	Uncredited
1947	Brute Force	"Calypso" James	
1947	Linda, Be Good	Calypso Singer	
1948	Romance on the High Seas	Specialty Singer	
1957	Lux Video Theatre	Bartender	Episode: "To Have and Have Not"
1957	The Unknown Terror	Himself	
1958	Father Knows Best	Bongo Instructor	Episode: "Calypso Bud"
1958	The Buccaneer	Scipio	Final film appearance
1967	The Andy Griffith Show	Man	Episode: "Howard's New Life"

== See also ==
- List of calypso musicians
