= Gangway for Tomorrow =

1943 film by John H. Auer

- Theatrical release poster
- Directed by: John H. Auer
- Written by: Arch Oboler (screenplay)
- Produced by: John H. Auer
- Starring: John Carradine; Robert Ryan
- Cinematography: Nicholas Musuraca
- Edited by: George Crone
- Music by: Roy Webb
- Distributed by: RKO Radio Pictures
- Release date: December 16, 1943 (U.S.)
- Running time: 69 min.
- Country: United States
- Language: English

Gangway for Tomorrow is a 1943 American anthology film produced and directed by the Austrian-American John H. Auer, and originally known by its working title, An American Story. Steeped in the propaganda tones of early World War II features, the film is largely B-fare.

== Plot ==
Five defense workers on their way to the munitions factory tell their stories: a refugee from the French Resistance, a frustrated race car driver, a prison warden, a former Miss America, and an intellectual who dropped out of society and saw the country as a bum.

== Cast ==
- Margo as Lisette Rene
- John Carradine as Mr. Wellington
- Robert Ryan as Joe Dunham
- Amelita Ward as Mary Jones, Miss America
- William Terry as Bob Nolan
- Harry Davenport as Fred Taylor
- James Bell as Tom Burke
- Charles Arnt as Jim Benson
- Alan Carney as Swallow
- Wally Brown as Sam
- Erford Gage as Dan Barton
- Richard Ryen as Colonel Mueller
- Warren Hymer as Pete
- Michael St. Angel as Mechanic
- Don Dillaway as Mechanic
- Sam McDaniel as Hank
- John Wald as Radio Announcer
- Ludwig Donath as Polish Worker
- unbilled players include Rita Corday

== Reception ==
Despite its attempt to divert from the usual formulaic patriotic films of the period, Gangway for Tomorrow was relegated to second billing in most theatres. Critical reviews, however, were more sympathetic, the New York Daily Mirror noted, "The screen as a medium for useful propaganda is well illustrated by Gangway for Tomorrow ... Turning in the best performances are Margo, John Carradine ... and Robert Ryan." In a similar vein; "An unpretentious little film, running at just 69 minutes, Gangway is nevertheless fresh and bright in treatment and provides an interesting story of five factory workers ... The members of the cast, in particular, Margo and Robert Ryan, handle their assignments well."
