= Seven Days Ashore =

1944 film by John H. Auer

- Theatrical release poster
- Directed by: John H. Auer
- Screenplay by: Edward Verdier; Irving Phillips; Lawrence Kimble
- Story by: Jacques Deval
- Produced by: John H. Auer
- Starring: Wally Brown; Alan Carney; Marcy McGuire; Virginia Mayo; Elaine Shepard; Gordon Oliver; Amelita Ward; Dooley Wilson
- Cinematography: Russell Metty
- Edited by: Harry Marker
- Music by: Lew Pollack
- Production company: RKO Pictures
- Distributed by: RKO Pictures
- Release date: April 25, 1944
- Running time: 74 minutes
- Country: United States
- Language: English

Seven Days Ashore is a 1944 American comedy film directed by John H. Auer and written by Edward Verdier, Irving Phillips and Lawrence Kimble. The film stars Wally Brown, Alan Carney, Marcy McGuire, Virginia Mayo, Elaine Shepard, Gordon Oliver, Amelita Ward and Dooley Wilson. The film was released on April 25, 1944, by RKO Pictures.

== Plot ==
Dan Arland is a fun-loving playboy who has been away at sea in the Merchant Marine for several months. A pair of violinists in Dot Diamond's all-female band—Carol Dean and Lucy Banning—have no idea that Dan's been romancing both of them. Both end up waiting for him when his ship arrives in San Francisco for a seven-day leave. His actual girlfriend—Annabelle Rogers—finds out about Dan's being on shore leave, too.

Dan begins coming up with schemes to get out of his dilemma. First, he uses a hat with three names for his selection process, drawing Lucy’s name and throwing out Carol’s. Then he persuades a couple of shipmates, Monty Stephens and Orval Martin, to pose as millionaires and woo the two musicians. He pretends he is suffering from an old war wound and then asks Monty to take Lucy to the Indigo Club where her band is performing. He’s about to greet Carol but then bumps into his parents and Annabelle (Annabelle is staying at his parents’ home and they hope that their son reconciles with her). He sends Carol off to the club with Orval. There are many other situations causing complications and all the ladies figure out what he’s doing and so try to give him a taste of his own medicine, making him believe he's about to be served with a breach-of-contract lawsuit. The best way to avoid this is to get rid of Carol and Lucy and as such he tells Orval and Monty to pretend to be millionaires and romance the gold-digging violinists. But what he doesn’t know is that Annabelle has joined forces with Lucy and Carol to teach him a lesson. After a series of mixups (including the fact that Annabelle is engaged to Alfred Jones) Dan and Annabelle decide to get married before Dan's seven days ashore are up.

== Cast ==
- Wally Brown as Monty Stephens
- Alan Carney as Orval 'Handsome' Martin
- Marcy McGuire as Dot Diamond
- Virginia Mayo as Carol Dean
- Elaine Shepard as Annabelle Rogers
- Gordon Oliver as Dan Arland Jr.
- Amelita Ward as Lucy Banning
- Dooley Wilson as Jason
- Marjorie Gateson as Mrs. Elizabeth Arland
- Alan Dinehart as Daniel Arland
- Miriam LaVelle as Hazel
- Margaret Dumont as Mrs. Croxton-Lynch
- Freddie Slack and His Orchestra as Themselves
- Freddie Fisher as himself
- Emory Parnell as Captain Harvey

Note: A young Dorothy Malone appears unbilled as the pianist in Dot's band.
