= Mexican Spitfire's Blessed Event =

1943 film by Leslie Goodwins

- Theatrical release poster
- Directed by: Leslie Goodwins
- Screenplay by: Charles E. Roberts; Dane Lussier
- Story by: Charles E. Roberts
- Produced by: Bert Gilroy
- Starring: Lupe Vélez; Leon Errol; Walter Reed; Elisabeth Risdon; Lydia Bilbrook; Hugh Beaumont
- Cinematography: Jack MacKenzie
- Edited by: Harry Marker
- Music by: C. Bakaleinikoff
- Production company: RKO Pictures
- Distributed by: RKO Pictures
- Release date: July 17, 1943
- Running time: 63 minutes
- Country: United States
- Language: English

Mexican Spitfire's Blessed Event is a 1943 American comedy film directed by Leslie Goodwins and written by Charles E. Roberts and Dane Lussier. It is the sequel to the 1942 film Mexican Spitfire's Elephant. The film stars Lupe Vélez, Leon Errol, Walter Reed, Elisabeth Risdon, Lydia Bilbrook and Hugh Beaumont. The film was released on July 17, 1943, by RKO Pictures.

This was the eighth and final film in the series. It marks the penultimate screen appearance for Lupe Vélez, who committed suicide on 14 Dec 1944 after completing one more feature in her native Mexico.

== Plot ==
The story unfolds at a dude ranch. Once again, Dennis is competing with another man, in this case George Sharpe, for a contract with distiller Lord Epping. Due to a misunderstanding, everyone thinks Carmelita has had a baby, when in fact it's her cat that has become a new mother. Epping is willing to sign with Dennis provided he can see the baby, so as always, Carmelita and Uncle Matt have to resort to all sorts of subterfuge—including the inevitable impersonation of Epping by Matt and the resultant confusion for everyone else—in order to set things right.

== Cast ==
- Lupe Vélez as Carmelita Lindsay
- Leon Errol as Uncle Matt Lindsay / Lord Basil Epping
- Walter Reed as Dennis Lindsay
- Elisabeth Risdon as Aunt Della Lindsay
- Lydia Bilbrook as Lady Ada Epping
- Hugh Beaumont as George Sharpe
- Aileen Carlyle as Mrs. Pettibone
- Alan Carney as Navaho Room bartender
- Wally Brown as Sagebrush Inn Desk Clerk (uncredited)
- Marietta Canty as Verbena

Note: This film was made before RKO paired Carney and Brown as a comedy team, but they have no scenes together.
