= Rookies in Burma =

1943 film by Leslie Goodwins

- Directed by: Leslie Goodwins; James Casey (assistant)
- Written by: Edward James
- Produced by: Bert Gilroy
- Starring: Wally Brown; Alan Carney; Erford Gage; Joan Barclay
- Cinematography: Harry J. Wild
- Edited by: Harry Marker
- Music by: C. Bakaleinikoff
- Production company: RKO Radio Pictures
- Release date: December 7, 1943 (US)
- Running time: 62 minutes
- Country: United States
- Language: English

Rookies in Burma is a 1943 American comedy film directed by Leslie Goodwins from an original screenplay by Edward James. Produced and distributed by RKO Radio Pictures, it was released on December 7, 1943, being a sequel to the earlier 1943 film, Adventures of a Rookie. Both Rookie military comedies star RKO's comedy team of the 1940s, Wally Brown and Alan Carney.

Rookies in Burma was produced by Bert Gilroy, who had been making two-reel comedies for the studio since 1934; he also produced many low-budget features for RKO. This was the last film in which the actor Erford Gage would perform. After it wrapped, Gage reported for duty in the U.S. Army. He died in March 1945 in the Philippines, as a result of wounds suffered in action.

== Plot ==
While stationed in Burma, buck privates Jerry Miles and Mike Strager are assigned to kitchen duty when they end up captured and taken to a prisoner-of-war camp with other soldiers, including their old platoon nemesis Sgt. Burke.

The three escape and encounter two stranded American showgirls, Connie and Janie, along the way. A clever ruse causes a company of Japanese soldiers pursuing them to plunge off a cliff. An elephant helps enable the five to get back to safety, although not before a Japanese tank begins firing at them. Everyone ends up safe and sound, although Jerry and Mike end up right back where they began, peeling potatoes.

== Cast ==
- Wally Brown as Jerry
- Alan Carney as Mike
- Erford Gage as Sgt. Burke
- Joan Barclay as Connie
- Claire Carleton as Janie
- Ted Hecht as Tomura
