= Girl Rush =

1944 film by Gordon Douglas

- Theatrical release poster
- Directed by: Gordon Douglas
- Screenplay by: Robert E. Kent
- Story by: László Vadnay; Aladar Laszlo
- Produced by: John H. Auer
- Starring: Wally Brown; Alan Carney; Frances Langford; Barbara Jo Allen; Robert Mitchum; Paul Hurst; Patti Brill; Sarah Padden
- Cinematography: Nicholas Musuraca
- Edited by: W. Duncan Mansfield
- Music by: Leigh Harline
- Production company: RKO Pictures
- Distributed by: RKO Pictures
- Release date: October 25, 1944
- Running time: 65 minutes
- Country: United States
- Language: English

Girl Rush is a 1944 American comedy film directed by Gordon Douglas and written by Robert E. Kent. The film stars Wally Brown, Alan Carney, Frances Langford, Barbara Jo Allen, Robert Mitchum, Paul Hurst, Patti Brill and Sarah Padden. The film was released on October 25, 1944, by RKO Pictures.

== Plot ==
During the gold rush of 1849, two vaudevillians, Jerry Miles and Mike Strager, travel to find gold in a town called Red Creek which lacks women. The men of Red Creek promise them gold in return for their bringing women to the town. As Jerry's and Mike's vaudeville troupe, which includes women, nears Red Creek, they learn the town may not be welcoming. The men in the troupe dress like women to test the town's attitude. Upon discovering the ruse, a fight breaks out; however, the vaudevillians are finally accepted and perform. During the performance, news comes that a huge gold deposit has been located near town, and everyone rushes out, leaving Jerry and Mike alone on stage.

== Cast ==
- Wally Brown as Jerry Miles
- Alan Carney as Mike Strager
- Frances Langford as Flo Daniels
- Barbara Jo Allen as Suzie Banks (billed as Vera Vague)
- Robert Mitchum as Jimmy Smith
- Paul Hurst as Muley
- Patti Brill as Claire
- Sarah Padden as Mrs. Emma Mason
- Cy Kendall as 'Honest' Greg Barlan
- John Merton as Scully

== See also ==
- List of American films of 1944
