= Genius at Work =

1946 film by Leslie Goodwins

- Theatrical release poster
- Directed by: Leslie Goodwins
- Screenplay by: Monte Brice; Robert E. Kent
- Produced by: Herman Schlom
- Starring: Wally Brown; Alan Carney; Anne Jeffreys; Lionel Atwill; Bela Lugosi
- Cinematography: Robert De Grasse
- Edited by: Marvin Coil
- Music by: Paul Sawtell; Roy Webb
- Production company: RKO Pictures
- Distributed by: RKO Pictures
- Release date: October 20, 1946
- Running time: 61 minutes
- Country: United States
- Language: English

Genius at Work is a 1946 American comedy film directed by Leslie Goodwins and written by Monte Brice and Robert E. Kent. The film stars Wally Brown, Alan Carney, Anne Jeffreys, Lionel Atwill and Bela Lugosi. The film was released on October 20, 1946, by RKO Pictures.

It was the last of eight films starring the Brown-Carney comedy team, as well as the final feature film appearance of Atwill, who died in 1946 while filming a serial.

== Plot ==
Jerry Miles and Mike Strager co-host a radio mystery series, "Crime of the Week," with young Ellen Brent writing their scripts. What she writes about the kidnapping of millionaire John Saunders by someone called "The Cobra" is suspiciously close to the facts of the case.

It turns out that the radio station's owner, Latimer Marsh (Lionel Atwill), is the Cobra, assisted in his diabolical crimes by Stone (Bela Lugosi), his sadistic butler. Chloroform is used on Ellen when she gets too close to the truth and an attempt is made to frame her for the kidnapping and a murder. The bumbling and cowardly Jerry and Mike try to be of help to her in their own way, but Lt. Rick Campbell is the one who ends up saving them all.

== Cast ==
- Wally Brown as Jerry Miles
- Alan Carney as Mike Strager
- Anne Jeffreys as Ellen Brent
- Lionel Atwill as Latimer Marsh / The Cobra
- Bela Lugosi as Stone
- Marc Cramer as Lt. Rick Campbell
- Ralph Dunn as Lt. Gilley
