= Leslie Goodwins =

English film director (1899–1969)

- Born: 17 September 1899; London, England
- Died: 8 January 1969 (aged 69); Hollywood, California, US
- Occupations: Film director, screenwriter
- Years active: 1926–1966

Leslie Goodwins (17 September 1899 – 8 January 1969) was an English film director and screenwriter. He directed nearly 100 films between 1926 and 1966, notably 27 features and shorts with Leon Errol, including the Mexican Spitfire series. His 1936 film Dummy Ache was nominated for an Academy Award in 1936 for Best Short Subject (Two-Reel). Dummy Ache was preserved by the Academy Film Archive and the Library of Congress in 2013. His 1937 film Should Wives Work? (starring Errol) was also nominated for an Academy Award in the same category. He was born in London, England and he died in Hollywood, California.

Goodwins began his screen career in the waning years of silent films, as a gag writer and then director. He directed comedy stars Snub Pollard and Ben Turpin for the low-budget Weiss Brothers studio. In 1936 producer Maurice Conn hired Goodwins to direct features for Ambassador Pictures starring Pinky Tomlin or Frankie Darro. That same year he joined the two-reel comedy unit at RKO Radio Pictures, two of his early efforts earning Academy Award nominations. Goodwins became a fixture at RKO, equally adept at action and mystery stories but specialising in comedy. He remained with the short-subject division while working on feature films, notably the popular Mexican Spitfire comedies. He remained with RKO through 1951.

In 1950 Goodwins entered the new field of television, directing Jackie Gleason in The Life of Riley. The director's long experience with budget productions made him an ideal choice for fast-paced television production, and he was involved in several hit shows including Topper, The Cisco Kid, My Favorite Martian, F Troop, and Gilligan's Island.

== Partial filmography ==
- With Love and Kisses (1936)
- Headline Crasher (1936)
- Robin Hood, Jr. (1936)
- Dummy Ache (1936) short subject
- Deep South (1937) short subject
- Should Wives Work? (1937) short subject
- The Devil Diamond (1937)
- Young Dynamite (1937)
- The Girl from Mexico (1939)
- Way Down South (1939) co-director
- Men Against the Sky (1940)
- Let's Make Music (1941)
- Parachute Battalion (1941)
- Rookies in Burma (1943)
- Ladies' Day (1943)
- Silver Skates (1943)
- The Mummy's Curse (1944)
- Murder in the Blue Room (1944)
- Vacation in Reno (1946)
- Dragnet (1947)
- The Lone Wolf in London (1947)
- Gold Fever (1952)
- Fireman Save My Child (1954)
- Paris Follies of 1956 (1955)
- The Go-Getter (1956)
