= Max Wagner =

Mexican actor (1901–1975)

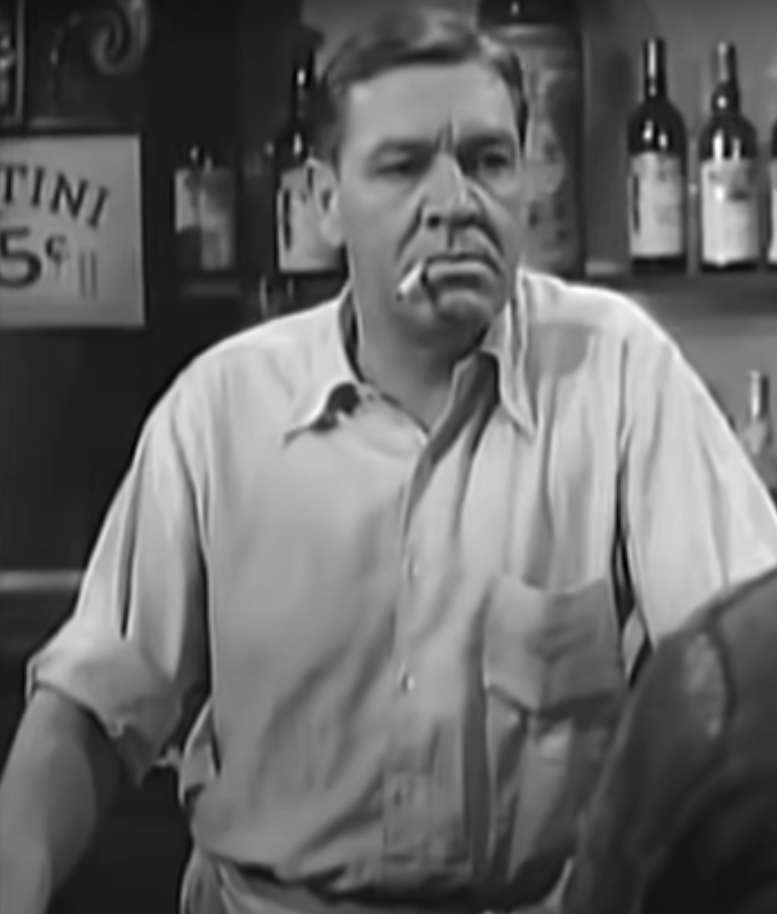
- Wagner in Dick Tracy vs. Cueball (1946)
- Born: November 28, 1901; Torreón, Coahuila, Mexico
- Died: November 16, 1975 (aged 73); Hollywood, California, U.S.
- Resting place: Hollywood Forever Cemetery
- Occupation: Actor
- Years active: 1924–1975

Max Wagner (November 28, 1901 – November 16, 1975) was a Mexican actor who specialized in playing small parts such as thugs, gangsters, sailors, henchmen, bodyguards, cab drivers and moving men, appearing more than 400 films in his career, most without receiving screen credit. In 1927, he was a leading witness in the well-publicized manslaughter trials of actor Paul Kelly and actress/screenwriter Dorothy Mackaye.

== Biography ==
Wagner was one of five children, all boys, of William Wallace Wagner, a railroad conductor, and Edith Wagner, a writer who provided dispatches for the Christian Science Monitor during the Mexican Revolution. When he was 10 years old, his father was killed by rebels and the family moved to Salinas, California, where he met John Steinbeck, who became a lifelong friend. Steinbeck based the character of the boy in his novel The Red Pony on Wagner.

Three of Wagner's brothers were working in Hollywood – Jack Wagner and Blake Wagner as cameramen for D.W. Griffith, Hal Roach and Mack Sennett, and Bob as an assistant cameraman at First National – and Max Wagner moved there in 1924, where he got an acting job on the Harry Langdon film his brother Jack was working on, All Night Long.

Under the name "Max Baron", Wagner acted in many Spanish-language versions of English-language films, which studios made as a matter of course in the early days of sound films, He also served as a Spanish language coach for other actors, and appeared in many of the "Mexican Spitfire" films starring Lupe Vélez, where he also served to monitor Velez's Spanish ad-libs for profanity.

Other series that Wagner appeared in include the Charlie Chan films, and Tom Mix serials, as well as others made by Mascot Pictures Corporation. In the 1940s, Wagner was part of Preston Sturges' unofficial "stock company" of character actors, appearing in six films written and directed by Sturges, beginning with The Palm Beach Story.

In 1940 during the filming of "The Mad Doctor", Wagner was credited for driving 50,000 miles as an on-screen taxi driver on the studio back lots of Hollywood. Since his appearance as a cab driver in Charlie Chan in Shanghai (1935), producers often cast him as a wise-cracking or henchman taxi driver. "I was cast as a taxi driver about five years ago", Wagner told a reporter. "And I was typed."

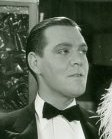
Max Wagner in 1933.

Wagner's career has several breaks in it. He served with the U.S. Army in the North African Campaign of World War II, and his struggle with alcoholism caused a short break in 1950.

== Paul Kelly case ==
Wagner was the star prosecution witness in the manslaughter trials of actor Paul Kelly and actress/screenwriter Dorothy Mackaye in 1927. Wagner was Kelly's roommate.

During an alcohol-fueled party at Wagner and Kelly's apartment on April 16, 1927, Kelly beat to death Mackaye's husband, Ray Raymond, a Vaudeville entertainer. Kelly and Mackaye had been seeing each other for some time before the fight had occurred. Wagner was present when Kelly and Raymond were fighting. One account reports that Kelly backhanded Wagner when the latter tried to stop him from confronting Raymond. When a Japanese houseboy who had served drinks at the party disappeared before the trial, Wagner testified of finding a note indicating the houseboy's intent to return to Asia.

At her own trial several months later, Mackaye testified that Kelly and Raymond had agreed to the fight as a duel, and that Wagner was Kelly's second for the duel. At one point, Wagner testified that he brought $800 from Kelly to Mackaye to pay the doctor who attended Raymond before his death, but Wagner denied that this payment was meant as part of a cover-up.

Kelly was convicted of manslaughter but served only two years in prison. Mackaye was sentenced to 10 months in prison on accessory and concealing evidence convictions. Kelly and Mackaye were married after Kelly's release from prison. Wagner and Kelly appeared together in two films after the incident: Death on the Diamond (1934) and Frenchie (1950).

== Later career ==
In 1952, Wagner began to appear on television, in episodes of such shows as The Cisco Kid, Zane Grey Theater and Perry Mason, playing much the same kind of parts he played in the movies.

He was a regular cast member on the western television series Gunsmoke, making nearly 80 appearances between 1959 and 1973. He also appeared in many episodes of The Rifleman, Bonanza, Cimarron Strip, The Wild Wild West and Maverick, including a guest-starring role in the 1959 Rifleman episode "Blood Brother." He also had roles in the original Star Trek and The Twilight Zone series. He appeared in more than 200 television episodes between 1952 and 1974.

Notable film roles for Wagner include a supporting role in the cult science fiction classic Invaders from Mars (1953), an actor playing a gangster in the film-within-a-film segment of Bullets or Ballots (1936), and the bull farm attendant in the Laurel and Hardy comedy The Bullfighters (1945). In a 1959 interview, Wagner joked that he used to play "the third mugg to come through the door behind the boss", but that in his status had been elevated by efforts to cut costs, so that "all three of us come through the door together now".

Late in his career, he appeared in To Kill a Mockingbird (1962) and The Man Who Shot Liberty Valance (1962). In 1963 Wagner appeared (uncredited) as a Train Bum on The Virginian in the episode titled "Duel at Shiloh."

He also occasionally composed music, such as the Mexican folk ballad "Pedro, Rudarte y Simon" in the Western film The Last Trail (1933).

== Death ==
Wagner died of a heart attack in Hollywood in 1975.

== Filmography ==
- The First Auto (1927) - Bartender (uncredited)
- The Thrill Seekers (1927) - A Hood
- Numbered Men (1930) - Convict Road Laborer (uncredited)
- Shooting Straight (1930) - Gambler (uncredited)
- El último de los Vargas (1930) - Estévez
- El valiente (1930) - Sargento de policia
- Going Wild (1930) - Ferguson - Pilot (uncredited)
- Entre platos y notas (1930)
- Cupido Chauffeur (1930)
- El código penal (1931) - (uncredited)
- The Hot Heiress (1931) - Kidney Beet - on Dance Floor (uncredited)
- The Good Bad Girl (1931) - Thug
- Cuerpo y alma (1931) - (uncredited)
- El pasado acusa (1931) - Minor Role (uncredited)
- Suicide Fleet (1931) - Radio Operator (uncredited)
- Step Sisters (1932) - Joey
- Cock of the Air (1932) - Military Policeman (uncredited)
- It's Tough to Be Famous (1932) - Ben, a Sailor (uncredited)
- The World and the Flesh (1932) - Vorobiov
- The Last Mile (1932) - Max Kruger (uncredited)
- Renegades of the West (1932) - Bob
- Rockabye (1932) - Reporter (uncredited)
- Grand Slam (1933) - Fred (uncredited)
- Broadway Bad (1933) - A Reporter (uncredited)
- The Whispering Shadow (1933, Serial) - Kruger - Henchman #6 [Ch. 1] (uncredited)
- Song of the Eagle (1933) - Sam, Ex-Doughboy (uncredited)
- Emergency Call (1933) - Police Patrolman (uncredited)
- Arizona to Broadway (1933) - Pete
- Before Dawn (1933) - Policeman in Car (uncredited)
- Morning Glory (1933) - Smoker in Diner (uncredited)
- The Last Trail (1933) - Duke Thompson, Henchman (uncredited)
- The Wolf Dog (1933, Serial) - Dave Harmon
- Goodbye Love (1933) - Alimony Inmate (uncredited)
- Sons of the Desert (1933) - Brawny Speakeasy Manager (uncredited)
- Miss Fane's Baby Is Stolen (1934) - Grip (uncredited)
- Wharf Angel (1934) - Waiter (uncredited)
- The Lost Jungle (1934, Serial) - Slade, Crewman
- I Like It That Way (1934) - Pupil (uncredited)
- Hell Bent for Love (1934) - Ernest Dallas
- The Personality Kid (1934) - Max (uncredited)
- Blind Date (1934) - Evans - Bob's Chauffeur (uncredited)
- Name the Woman (1934) - Reporter
- Death on the Diamond (1934) - Hot Dog Vendor (uncredited)
- She Had to Choose (1934) - Hold-Up Man
- The Captain Hates the Sea (1934) - Sailor (uncredited)
- Gridiron Flash (1934) - Convict Football Player (uncredited)
- The Oil Raider (1934) - Simmons
- 365 Nights in Hollywood (1934) - Taxi Driver (uncredited)
- The Mighty Barnum (1934) - Man in Museum (uncredited)
- Bachelor of Arts (1934) - Tough Character (uncredited)
- Romance in Manhattan (1935) - Man at East River (uncredited)
- A Notorious Gentleman (1935) - Taxicab Driver (uncredited)
- Storm Over the Andes (1935) - Sentry
- The Miracle Rider (1935, Serial) - Morley - Henchman
- Under the Pampas Moon (1935) - Big José
- Ladies Crave Excitement (1935) - Pat (uncredited)
- The Daring Young Man (1935) - Reporter (uncredited)
- Dante's Inferno (1935) - Drunken Sailor (uncredited)
- The Adventures of Rex and Rinty (1935, Serial) - Tramp [Ch. 5] (uncredited)
- The Farmer Takes a Wife (1935) - Harry (uncredited)
- Welcome Home (1935) - Clem (uncredited)
- Charlie Chan in Shanghai (1935) - Taxi Driver
- Dr. Socrates (1935) - Gangster (uncredited)
- Case of the Missing Man (1935) - Steve's Second Henchman (uncredited)
- Three Kids and a Queen (1935) - Reporter (uncredited)
- Mary Burns, Fugitive (1935) - Sailor
- The Fighting Marines (1935, Serial) - Gibson - Henchman
- The Adventures of Frank Merriwell (1936, Serial) - Pug O'Leary (uncredited)
- Paddy O'Day (1936) - Milkman's Helper on Dock (uncredited)
- Follow the Fleet (1936) - Marine Leader on Ship (uncredited)
- Love on a Bet (1936) - Reporter (uncredited)
- Two in Revolt (1936) - Davis
- The House of a Thousand Candles (1936) - Henchman (uncredited)
- The Moon's Our Home (1936) - Truck Driver (uncredited)
- The Girl from Mandalay (1936) - Drunken Brawler (uncredited)
- The Case Against Mrs. Ames (1936) - Soupy (uncredited)
- The Crime Patrol (1936) - Bennie
- Sons O' Guns (1936) - Soldier (uncredited)
- Dancing Pirate (1936) - Pirate (uncredited)
- Bullets or Ballots (1936) - Actor Impersonating Kruger in Newsreel (uncredited)
- Trapped by Television (1936) - Henchman Al (uncredited)
- The Bride Walks Out (1936) - Furniture Mover (uncredited)
- Charlie Chan at the Race Track (1936) - Joe (uncredited)
- Two-Fisted Gentleman (1936) - First Beggar
- Love Begins at 20 (1936) - Lester - O'Bannion's Driver
- Walking on Air (1936) - Sam, Second Gas Station Attendant (uncredited)
- The Girl on the Front Page (1936) - Fireman (uncredited)
- The Big Game (1936) - Man Outside Hotel (uncredited)
- Come and Get It (1936) - Lumberjack (uncredited)
- Love Letters of a Star (1936) - Doolin
- Night Waitress (1936) - Diner Trying to Date Helen (uncredited)
- Chatterbox (1936) - Himself (uncredited)
- Career Woman (1936) - Reporter-Clarkdale (uncredited)
- We Who Are About to Die (1937) - Cell Block E Convict (uncredited)
- Smart Blonde (1937) - Chuck Cannon
- God's Country and the Woman (1937) - Gus
- Black Legion (1937) - Truck Driver in Diner (uncredited)
- You Only Live Once (1937) - Dan - Corridor Guard (uncredited)
- The Great O'Malley (1937) - School Bus Driver (uncredited)
- When Love Is Young (1937) - Taxi Driver (uncredited)
- Step Lively, Jeeves! (1937) - Joey
- Wings Over Honolulu (1937) - Marine (uncredited)
- There Goes My Girl (1937) - Whelan's Strong Arm Man (uncredited)
- San Quentin (1937) - Prison Runner
- Border Cafe (1937) - Shakey
- Slim (1937) - Griff
- Alcatraz Island (1937) - Baggage Man (uncredited)
- Some Blondes Are Dangerous (1937) - Ruby Hall
- Submarine D-1 (1937) - Sailor (uncredited)
- Born to Be Wild (1938) - Jake - Trucker in Cafe (uncredited)
- Penrod and His Twin Brother (1938) - Blackie
- Maid's Night Out (1938) - Sam Johnson - Milk Man (uncredited)
- Mr. Moto's Gamble (1938) - Thug (uncredited)
- Accidents Will Happen (1938) - Eddie - Thurston's Muscleman (uncredited)
- Cocoanut Grove (1938) - Brakeman (uncredited)
- Professor Beware (1938) - Chinatown Barker (uncredited)
- Passport Husband (1938) - Henchman (uncredited)
- Letter of Introduction (1938) - Minor Role (uncredited)
- Painted Desert (1938) - Henchman Kincaid
- Room Service (1938) - House Detective (uncredited)
- Time Out for Murder (1938) - Tall Thin Sailor Checking Time (uncredited)
- The Arkansas Traveler (1938) - Hobo
- Red Barry (1938, Serial) - Truck Driver (uncredited)
- Tarnished Angel (1938) - Tough Casino Decoy (uncredited)
- Little Tough Guys in Society (1938) - Guest (uncredited)
- Up the River (1938) - Convict (uncredited)
- Scouts to the Rescue (1939, Serial) - Joe - Truck Driver-Henchman [Ch. 3] (uncredited)
- Off the Record (1939) - Visitor (uncredited)
- Wings of the Navy (1939) - Boss Mechanic (uncredited)
- Fast and Loose (1939) - Nolan's Henchman (uncredited)
- Cafe Society (1939) - Guest (uncredited)
- Society Smugglers (1939) - Massey's Chauffeur (uncredited)
- Winner Take All (1939) - Friend (uncredited)
- Mr. Moto in Danger Island (1939) - Sailor at Wrestling Match (uncredited)
- The Return of the Cisco Kid (1939) - Brings in Rustler (uncredited)
- The Girl from Mexico (1939) - Headwaiter at Casa del Toro (uncredited)
- The Gracie Allen Murder Case (1939) - Thug (uncredited)
- Waterfront (1939) - Committee Man (uncredited)
- Our Leading Citizen (1939) - Workman
- The Star Maker (1939) - Third Piano Mover (uncredited)
- 5th Ave Girl (1939) - Policeman (uncredited)
- The Day the Bookies Wept (1939) - Bet Placing Taxi Driver (uncredited)
- The Roaring Twenties (1939) - Gangster (uncredited)
- Reno (1939) - Police Lt. Joe Wilson (uncredited)
- Mexican Spitfire (1940) - Headwaiter - Mexican Pete's (uncredited)
- The Man Who Wouldn't Talk (1940) - Truck Driver (uncredited)
- The Grapes of Wrath (1940) - Guard (uncredited)
- Charlie Chan in Panama (1940) - Soldier (uncredited)
- The House Across the Bay (1940) - Jim
- Millionaire Playboy (1940) - Highway Patrol Officer (uncredited)
- Buck Benny Rides Again (1940) - Cowboy (uncredited)
- You Can't Fool Your Wife (1940) - Burglar
- The Ghost Breakers (1940) - Ship Porter (uncredited)
- Pop Always Pays (1940) - Bill - Policeman in Car 43 (uncredited)
- They Drive by Night (1940) - Sweeney (uncredited)
- Lucky Partners (1940) - Waiter (uncredited)
- Pier 13 (1940) - Tramp (uncredited)
- Wildcat Bus (1940) - Bus Driver Jackson (uncredited)
- Rhythm on the River (1940) - Cherry's Cabbie (uncredited)
- Men Against the Sky (1940) - Max - Radioman (uncredited)
- Hired Wife (1940) - Streetcar Conductor (uncredited)
- I'm Nobody's Sweetheart Now (1940) - Motorcycle Officer (uncredited)
- Street of Memories (1940) - Minor Role (uncredited)
- The Bank Dick (1940) - Shirtless Ditchdigger (uncredited)
- Trail of the Vigilantes (1940) - Joe
- The San Francisco Docks (1940) - Guard #2 (uncredited)
- The Mad Doctor (1941) - Cab Driver (uncredited)
- Nice Girl? (1941) - Sergeant (uncredited)
- Double Date (1941) - Policeman (uncredited)
- Ride on Vaquero (1941) - Partner (uncredited)
- Cyclone on Horseback (1941) - Jamison
- Parachute Battalion (1941) - Pilot (uncredited)
- Unexpected Uncle (1941) - Policeman at Johnny's Car (uncredited)
- Last of the Duanes (1941) - Townsman (uncredited)
- Texas (1941) - Fats Delaney (uncredited)
- Great Guns (1941) - New Recruit (uncredited)
- The Mexican Spitfire's Baby (1941) - Bartender (uncredited)
- The Bugle Sounds (1942) - Cavalry Trooper (uncredited)
- Obliging Young Lady (1942) - Jack - Diner Counterman (uncredited)
- Sing Your Worries Away (1942) - Danny - Cafe Counterman (uncredited)
- True to the Army (1942) - Female Impersonator (uncredited)
- Two Yanks in Trinidad (1942) - Lookout (uncredited)
- My Favorite Blonde (1942) - Bus Driver (uncredited)
- The Wife Takes a Flyer (1942) - Sergeant (uncredited)
- Moontide (1942) - Fisherman (uncredited)
- The Spoilers (1942) - Deputy (uncredited)
- Syncopation (1942) - Gangster (uncredited)
- Come on Danger (1942) - Tough Guy (uncredited)
- Priorities on Parade (1942) - Workman (uncredited)
- Sabotage Squad (1942) - Recruiting Sergeant (uncredited)
- The Talk of the Town (1942) - Moving Man (uncredited)
- The Palm Beach Story (1942) - Tom's Best Man (uncredited)
- Mexican Spitfire's Elephant (1942) - Villa Luigi Headwaiter (uncredited)
- Overland to Deadwood (1942) - Buck (uncredited)
- Panama Hattie (1942) - Jailer (uncredited)
- Highways by Night (1942) - Motorcycle Cop (uncredited)
- You Can't Escape Forever (1942) - Lonesome Club Bouncer (uncredited)
- Seven Days' Leave (1942) - Military Policeman (uncredited)
- A Night to Remember (1942) - Policeman Temple (uncredited)
- Secrets of the Underground (1942) - Auction Workman (uncredited)
- That Nazty Nuisance (1943) - Seaman Olsen (uncredited)
- The Miracle of Morgan's Creek (1943) - Military Police Driver (uncredited)
- How to Operate Behind Enemy Lines (1943) - Rudy - the Sailor (uncredited)
- Boss of Boomtown (1944) - Sergeant George Dunne
- The Great Moment (1944) - Bartender at Costello's (uncredited)
- Raiders of Ghost City (1944, Serial) - Trooper (uncredited)
- The Singing Sheriff (1944) - Dirk (uncredited)
- Girl Rush (1944) - Miner with Muley at Bar (uncredited)
- Hi, Beautiful (1944) - Sailor (uncredited)
- Can't Help Singing (1944) - Cavalry Officer (uncredited)
- She Gets Her Man (1945) - Postman (uncredited)
- A Medal for Benny (1945) - Jake (uncredited)
- Circumstantial Evidence (1945) - Truck Driver (uncredited)
- It's in the Bag! (1945) - Nightclub Tough in Fight (uncredited)
- Zombies on Broadway (1945) - Waiter (uncredited)
- The Bullfighters (1945) - Farmer (uncredited)
- Where Do We Go from Here? (1945) - Sergeant (uncredited)
- I'll Tell the World (1945) - Man (uncredited)
- You Came Along (1945) - Taxi Driver (uncredited)
- Within These Walls (1945) - Guard (uncredited)
- Radio Stars on Parade (1945) - George
- Mama Loves Papa (1945) - City Official (uncredited)
- The Lost Weekend (1945) - Mike (uncredited)
- The Spanish Main (1945) - Bully (uncredited)
- Fallen Angel (1945) - Bartender (uncredited)
- An Angel Comes to Brooklyn (1945) - Plainclothesman (uncredited)
- Because of Him (1946) - Minor Role (uncredited)
- Riverboat Rhythm (1946) - Louis (uncredited)
- To Each His Own (1946) - Bootlegger (uncredited)
- Johnny Comes Flying Home (1946) - Minor Role (uncredited)
- The Truth About Murder (1946) - Henchman Mike (uncredited)
- The Strange Love of Martha Ivers (1946) - Jake (uncredited)
- Smoky (1946) - Bart (uncredited)
- Dick Tracy vs. Cueball (1946) - Bartender (uncredited)
- Vacation in Reno (1946) - Bartender (uncredited)
- It's a Wonderful Life (1946) - Cashier / Nick's Assistant Bouncer (uncredited)
- That Brennan Girl (1946) - Moving Man (uncredited)
- Sinbad the Sailor (1947) - Assistant Overseer (uncredited)
- The Sin of Harold Diddlebock (1947) - Doorman (uncredited)
- The Long Night (1947) - Man in Crowd (uncredited)
- Possessed (1947) - Man in Cafe (uncredited)
- Second Chance (1947) - Doorman (uncredited)
- Tycoon (1947) - Minor Role (uncredited)
- On Our Merry Way (1948) - Mover (uncredited)
- The Miracle of the Bells (1948) - Baggage Man (uncredited)
- The Big Clock (1948) - Guard at Janoth Building (uncredited)
- Half Past Midnight (1948) - Mike
- The Sainted Sisters (1948) - Townsman (uncredited)
- Shed No Tears (1948) - 2nd Investigating Detective (uncredited)
- Unfaithfully Yours (1948) - Stage Manager (uncredited)
- Force of Evil (1948) - Policeman #3 (uncredited)
- The Lucky Stiff (1949) - Garbageman (uncredited)
- Flaxy Martin (1949) - Charles McMahon - Driver (uncredited)
- Caught (1949) - Projectionist (uncredited)
- The Red Pony (1949) - Bartender (uncredited)
- El Paso (1949) - Deputy (uncredited)
- Adventure in Baltimore (1949) - Unemployed Townsman (uncredited)
- The Beautiful Blonde from Bashful Bend (1949) - Hoodlum (uncredited)
- It Happens Every Spring (1949) - Umpire (uncredited)
- Reign of Terror (1949) - Citizen (uncredited)
- Mighty Joe Young (1949) - Thug (uncredited)
- Bandits of El Dorado (1949) - Butler Paul (uncredited)
- A Kiss for Corliss (1949) - Second Cop at Archers (uncredited)
- The Eagle and the Hawk (1950) - Brown (uncredited)
- I'll Get By (1950) - Marine Sergeant (uncredited)
- The Sun Sets at Dawn (1950) - Prison Guard (uncredited)
- Frenchie (1950) - Drunk (uncredited)
- Pier 23 (1951) - Bar Patron (uncredited)
- The Secret of Convict Lake (1951) - Jack Purcell (uncredited)
- Meet Me After the Show (1951) - George, Hotel Doorman (uncredited)
- Jim Thorpe – All-American (1951) - Assistant Coach of N.Y. Giants (uncredited)
- The Racket (1951) - Durko - Ugly Henchman (uncredited)
- Flaming Feather (1952) - Sleeping Cowpoke in Hallway (uncredited)
- The Big Sky (1952) - Eggelston Henchmen (uncredited)
- Les Misérables (1952) - Revolutionary (uncredited)
- Park Row (1952) - Man Passing Bogus Receipts (uncredited)
- The Raiders (1952) - Rufus (uncredited)
- Stars and Stripes Forever (1952) - Irate Man in Theatre Audience (uncredited)
- Abbott and Costello Meet Captain Kidd (1952) - Pirate Lookout (uncredited)
- The Blazing Forest (1952) - Wally Riff, a Lumberjack (uncredited)
- Tropic Zone (1953) - First Mate (uncredited)
- Meet Me at the Fair (1953) - Iceman (uncredited)
- The Lady Wants Mink (1953) - Mr. Benson (uncredited)
- Invaders from Mars (1953) - Sgt. Rinaldi
- The President's Lady (1953) - Heckler (uncredited)
- Powder River (1953) - Saloon Worker (uncredited)
- The Farmer Takes a Wife (1953) - Boater (uncredited)
- Fort Algiers (1953) - Messenger (uncredited)
- Second Chance (1953) - (uncredited)
- Donovan's Brain (1953) - Station Agent (uncredited)
- Those Redheads from Seattle (1953) - Max - the Bartender (uncredited)
- The Great Diamond Robbery (1954) - Policeman (uncredited)
- Casanova's Big Night (1954) - Townsman (uncredited)
- Rails Into Laramie (1954) - Townsman (uncredited)
- The Lone Gun (1954) - Townsman (uncredited)
- Captain Kidd and the Slave Girl (1954) - Pirate (uncredited)
- Gorilla at Large (1954) - Policeman (uncredited)
- This Is My Love (1954) - Lunch Counter Customer (uncredited)
- The Country Girl (1954) - Expressman (uncredited)
- Timberjack (1955) - Man in Pick-Up-Hat Number (uncredited)
- Underwater! (1955) - Waiter (uncredited)
- East of Eden (1955) - Workman (uncredited)
- Top of the World (1955) - Howie - Air Force Photographer (uncredited)
- Son of Sinbad (1955) - Merchant at Marketplace (uncredited)
- Tennessee's Partner (1955) - Townsman (uncredited)
- The Girl in the Red Velvet Swing (1955) - Warden (uncredited)
- Illegal (1955) - Bartender (uncredited)
- Lucy Gallant (1955) - Oil Man (uncredited)
- I Died a Thousand Times (1955) - Deputy Charlie (uncredited)
- The Court-Martial of Billy Mitchell (1955) - Sergeant Major (uncredited)
- The Conqueror (1956) - Mongul Guard (uncredited)
- Westward Ho the Wagons! (1956) - Wagon Man (uncredited)
- Public Pigeon No. 1 (1957) - Police Detective (uncredited)
- The Spirit of St. Louis (1957) - Reporter (uncredited)
- The Wayward Bus (1957) - Bit part (uncredited)
- Robbery Under Arms (1957) - Goring
- A Nice Little Bank That Should Be Robbed (1958) - Bus Driver (uncredited)
- The Fiend Who Walked the West (1958) - Court Clerk (uncredited)
- The Buccaneer (1958) - City Guard Turnkey (uncredited)
- Ice Palace (1960) - Party Guest (uncredited)
- One Foot in Hell (1960) - Cantina Barfly (uncredited)
- Sunrise at Campobello (1960) - Convention Delegate (uncredited)
- A Fever in the Blood (1961) - Gubernatorial Convention Attendee (uncredited)
- Ada (1961) - Spectator in State House Gallery (uncredited)
- The Man Who Shot Liberty Valance (1962) - Townsman (uncredited)
- To Kill a Mockingbird (1962) - Courtroom Spectator (uncredited)
- It's a Mad, Mad, Mad, Mad World (1963) - Spectator (uncredited)
- 4 for Texas (1963) - Blackjack Dealer
- Law of the Lawless (1964) - Barfly (uncredited)
- Invitation to a Gunfighter (1964) - Townsman (uncredited)
- Shenandoah (1965) - Church Member (uncredited)
- The Great Race (1965) - Barfly (uncredited)
- Gunpoint (1966) - Townsman (uncredited)
- A Big Hand for the Little Lady (1966) - Cashier (uncredited)
- Waco (1966) - Townsman (uncredited)
- Return of the Gunfighter (1967) - Barfly (uncredited)
- The Adventures of Bullwhip Griffin (1967) - Townsman (uncredited)
- Hang 'Em High (1968) - Prisoner in Compound (uncredited)
- Rosemary's Baby (1968) - Man in Dream Sequence (uncredited)
- Where Were You When the Lights Went Out? (1968) - Minor Role (uncredited)
- The Legend of Lylah Clare (1968) - Reporter (uncredited)
- True Grit (1969) - Courtroom Spectator (uncredited)
- The Reivers (1969) - Race Spectator (uncredited)
- The Cheyenne Social Club (1970) - Barfly (uncredited)
- WUSA (1970) - Bar Patron (uncredited)
- Support Your Local Gunfighter (1971) - Townsman Watching Fight (uncredited)
- Get to Know Your Rabbit (1972) - Drunk (uncredited)
- Young Frankenstein (1974) - Villager (uncredited)
