= Jack Briggs (actor) =

American actor (1920–1998)

- Born: John Calvin Briggs; August 1, 1920
- Died: August 22, 1998 (aged 78)
- Occupation: Actor
- Years active: 1941–1952
- Spouse: Ginger Rogers (m. 1943; div. 1949)

John Calvin Briggs (August 1, 1920 – August 22, 1998) was an American actor.

He was the son of Mr. and Mrs. Benjamin Katz, and he attended DeWitt Clinton High School in New York. He served in the Marines during World War II.

Briggs' first theatrical experience came with the Maverick Theatre in Woodstock, New York, but it initially involved no acting. He worked behind the scenes until on-stage opportunities arose. He was known for Joan of Paris (1942), Ladies' Day (1943) and My Forbidden Past (1951).

He was married to Ginger Rogers from January 16, 1943 to September 7, 1949.

He died on August 22, 1998, and was buried at the Gerald B. H. Solomon Saratoga National Cemetery, in Schuylerville.

== Filmography ==
=== Film ===
Year	Title	Role	Notes
1941	Repent at Leisure	Phil	Uncredited
1941	Tom, Dick and Harry	Boy in Dream	Uncredited
1941	Parachute Battalion	Private	
1941	Father Takes a Wife	Joe - Senior's Driver	Uncredited
1941	Unexpected Uncle	Waiter	Uncredited
1941	The Mexican Spitfire's Baby	Orchestra Leader	Uncredited
1942	Joan of Paris	Robin	
1942	Four Jacks and a Jill	Nat	Uncredited
1942	Mexican Spitfire's Elephant	Lewis	Uncredited
1942	Highways by Night	Jim	Uncredited
1942	Army Surgeon	Hospital Orderly	Uncredited
1943	Ladies' Day	Marty Samuels	
1949	Fighting Man of the Plains	Townsman in Courtroom	Uncredited
1951	My Forbidden Past	Cousin Philippe	
1951	New Mexico	Pvt. Lindley	Uncredited
1951	The Prince Who Was a Thief	Officer	Uncredited

=== Television ===
Year	Title	Role	Notes
1950	The Lone Ranger	Al / Hatch	2 episodes
1952	Orient Express	Green	Episode: "The 13th Spy"; final role
