= The Last Trail (1933 film) =

1933 film by James Tinling

- Theatrical release poster
- Directed by: James Tinling
- Screenplay by: Stuart Anthony
- Based on: The Last Trail by Zane Grey
- Produced by: Sol M. Wurtzel
- Starring: George O'Brien; Claire Trevor; El Brendel; Matt McHugh; J. Carrol Naish; George Reed
- Cinematography: Arthur C. Miller
- Edited by: Barney Wolf
- Music by: Max Wagner
- Production company: Fox Film Corporation
- Distributed by: Fox Film Corporation
- Release date: August 25, 1933
- Running time: 60 minutes
- Country: United States
- Language: English

The Last Trail is a 1933 American pre-Code Western film directed by James Tinling and written by Stuart Anthony. The film stars George O'Brien, Claire Trevor, El Brendel, Matt McHugh, J. Carrol Naish, and George Reed. The film was released on August 25, 1933, by Fox Film Corporation. The picture was a remake of a 1921 film of the same name starring Wallace Beery.

== Cast ==
- George O'Brien as Tom Daley
- Claire Trevor as Patricia Carter
- El Brendel as Newt Olsen
- Matt McHugh as Looney McGann
- J. Carrol Naish as John Ross
- George Reed as Japonica Jones
- Lucille La Verne as Mrs. Wilson
- Ruth Warren as Sally Scott Olsen
- Luis Alberni as Pedro Gonzales
- Edward LeSaint as Judge Wilson
