= Winter Wonderland (film) =

1946 film by Bernard Vorhaus

- Theatrical release poster
- Directed by: Bernard Vorhaus
- Screenplay by: Peter Goldbaum; David Chandler; Arthur Marx; Gertrude Purcell
- Produced by: Walter Colmes; Harry R. Sokal
- Starring: Lynne Roberts; Charles Drake; Roman Bohnen; Eric Blore; Elinor Donahue; Renee Godfrey
- Cinematography: John Alton
- Edited by: Robert Jahns
- Music by: Paul Dessau
- Production company: Republic Pictures
- Distributed by: Republic Pictures
- Release date: May 12, 1946
- Running time: 71 minutes
- Country: United States
- Language: English

Winter Wonderland is a 1946 American drama film directed by Bernard Vorhaus, and written by Peter Goldbaum, David Chandler, Arthur Marx, and Gertrude Purcell. The film stars Lynne Roberts, Charles Drake, Roman Bohnen, Eric Blore, Elinor Donahue, and Renee Godfrey. The film was released on May 12, 1946, by Republic Pictures.

== Cast ==
- Lynne Roberts as Nancy Wheeler
- Charles Drake as Steve Kirk
- Roman Bohnen as Timothy Wheeler
- Eric Blore as Luddington
- Elinor Donahue as Betty Wheeler
- Renee Godfrey as Phyllis Simpson
- Janet Warren as Marge
- Harry Tyler as Seth
- Renie Riano as Mrs. Schuyler-Riggs
- Diana Mumby as Telephone Operator
- Alvin Hammer as Bellboy
