= Peter Godfrey (director) =

English actor and director (1899–1970)

- Born: 16 October 1899; London, UK
- Died: 4 March 1970 (aged 70); Hollywood, California, U.S.
- Occupations: Director, actor
- Years active: 1930–1958 (film)
- Spouse(s): Molly Veness; Renee Godfrey

Peter Godfrey (16 October 1899 – 4 March 1970) was an English actor and film director. Founder of the experimental Gate Theatre Salon in 1925, with his first wife Molly Veness, he staged London's first expressionistic production in the following year. He went into partnership with Velona Pilcher in 1927 and together they opened the Gate Theatre Studio in Villiers Street, Charing Cross. Eventually moving to Hollywood, he established a career as a film actor and director.

== Life and career ==
Godfrey began his career as a conjuror, clown, actor and director in repertory theatres around the United Kingdom. However, he became increasingly dissatisfied with the standard repertory plays, being himself attracted to the experimental works of American and Continental directors, and the avant-garde playwrights of the 1920s. To stage such plays, he and his wife, the actress Molly Veness, rented a room in Floral Street, Covent Garden, which they were forced to run as a private club since London County Council refused to grant a licence for their "theatre", which, according to Edna Antrobus, had only "one entrance and exit and a rickety wooden staircase".

The Gate Theatre Studio opened on 30 October 1925, and after staging plays by Molière and Strindberg established its reputation with a production staged in 1926 of Georg Kaiser's From Morn to Midnight, London's first expressionistic production. In 1927, the theatre club moved to Villiers Street, where it reached the peak of its success in the 1930–31 season.

Godfrey directed two British films in the early 1930s. In 1936 he directed a production of C. L. R. James's play Toussaint Louverture: The Story of the Only Successful Slave Revolt in History at the Westminster Theatre. Godfrey moved to New York City in around 1937, where he continued to write and produce plays. In 1939, now in Hollywood, he took up directing more permanently. In 1942 he became a dialogue director for RKO and Columbia Pictures. By the late 1940s Godfrey was a prominent director, working on films such as the Errol Flynn vehicles Cry Wolf and Escape Me Never. In the 1950s he switched to television and directed episodes for a variety of shows. With his second wife, actress Renee Haal, he established a Hollywood "Gate Theatre Studio" in 1943, which lasted for two years.

Godfrey died on 4 March 1970, at the age of 70. He is interred at Glendale's Forest Lawn Memorial Park Cemetery near his wife, Renee Godfrey.

== Selected filmography ==
=== Actor ===
- Leave It to Me (1933) - Siegffied Velour
- Heads We Go (1933) - Fancourt
- Good Morning, Boys (1937) - Cliquot
- Blockade (1938) - Roderigo - Cafe Magician
- Raffles (1939) - Crawshay
- The Hunchback of Notre Dame (1939) - Monk (uncredited)
- The Earl of Chicago (1940) - Judson
- Edison, the Man (1940) - Ashton
- Dr. Jekyll and Mr. Hyde (1941) - Poole
- Uncensored (1942) - Lou
- Forever and a Day (1943) - Mr. Pepperdish (uncredited)
- The Two Mrs. Carrolls (1947) - Racetrack Tout (uncredited)
- The Decision of Christopher Blake (1948) - Butts (uncredited) (final film role)

=== Director ===
- Down River (1931, directorial debut)
- The Lone Wolf Spy Hunt (1939)
- Unexpected Uncle (1941)
- Highways by Night (1942)
- Make Your Own Bed (1944)
- Indiscretion (1945)
- Christmas in Connecticut (1945)
- Hotel Berlin (1945)
- One More Tomorrow (1946)
- Cry Wolf (1947)
- The Two Mrs. Carrolls (1947)
- That Hagen Girl (1947)
- Escape Me Never (1947)
- The Woman in White (1948)
- The Decision of Christopher Blake (1948)
- One Last Fling (1949)
- The Girl from Jones Beach (1949)
- Barricade (1950)
- The Great Jewel Robber (1950)
- He's a Cockeyed Wonder (1950)
- One Big Affair (1952)
- Please Murder Me (1956, final film)

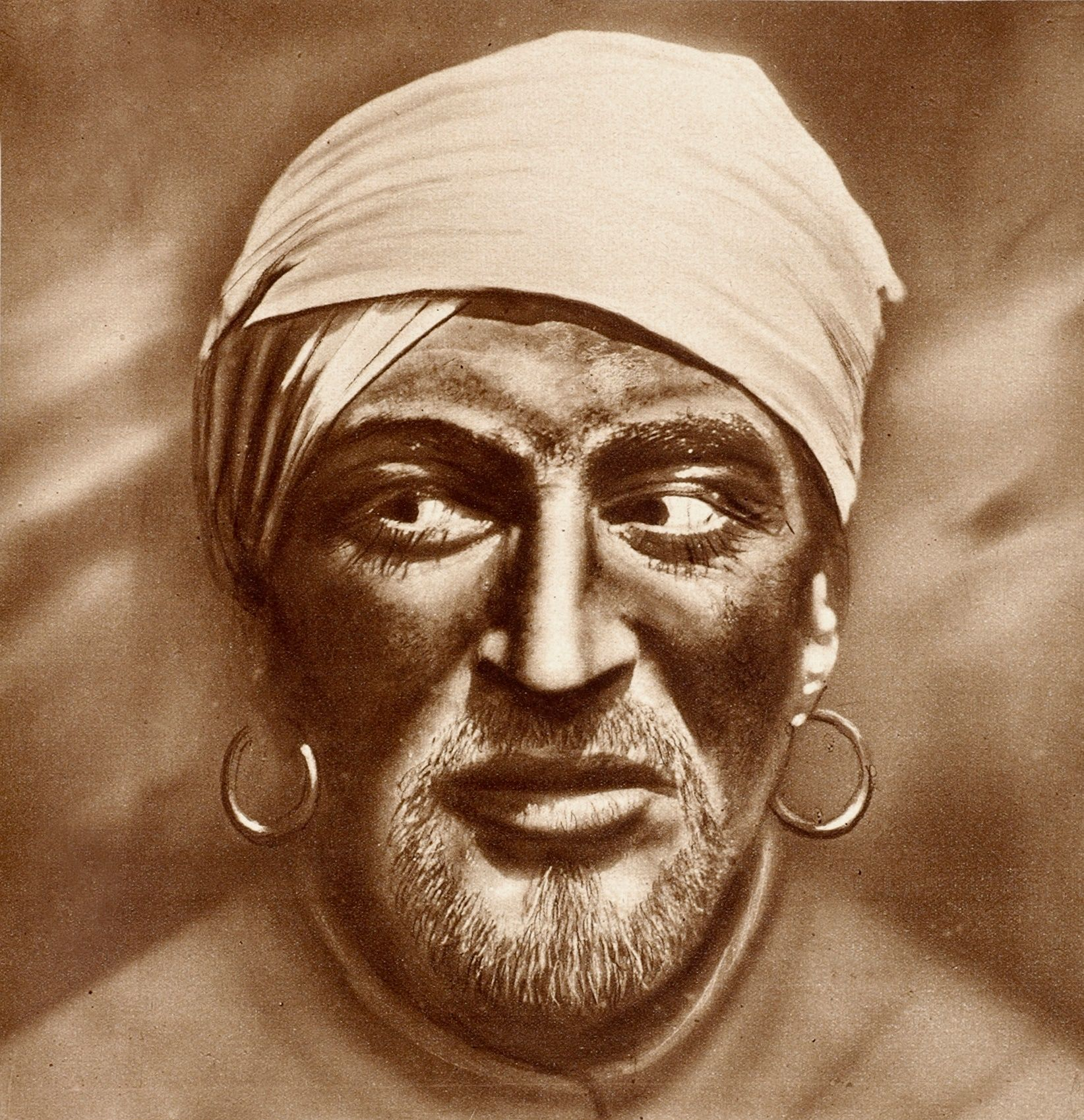
Godfrey as a Hindu character in a 1928 play

== Bibliography ==
- McNulty, Thomas. Errol Flynn: The Life and Career. McFarland, 2004.
