= Ladies' Day (film) =

1943 film by Leslie Goodwins

- Theatrical release poster
- Directed by: Leslie Goodwins
- Screenplay by: Dane Lussier; Charles E. Roberts
- Based on: Ladies' Day; 1939 play by Robert Considine; Edward C. Lilley; Bertrand Robinson
- Produced by: Bert Gilroy
- Starring: Lupe Vélez; Eddie Albert; Patsy Kelly; Max Baer; Jerome Cowan
- Cinematography: Jack MacKenzie
- Edited by: Harry Marker
- Music by: Roy Webb
- Production company: RKO Pictures
- Distributed by: RKO Pictures
- Release dates: March 26, 1943 (New York City premiere); April 9, 1943 (United States)
- Running time: 62 minutes
- Country: United States
- Language: English

Ladies' Day is a 1943 American comedy film directed by Leslie Goodwins and written by Charles E. Roberts and Dane Lussier, adapted from the play of the same name. The film stars Lupe Vélez, Eddie Albert, Patsy Kelly, Max Baer and Jerome Cowan. It was released on April 9, 1943, by RKO Pictures.

== Plot ==
Wives and girlfriends sit together at a Sox game to watch Wacky Waters pitch. He's a fun-loving guy who is delighted to learn that Hollywood star Pepita Zorita is at today's game, selling kisses for charity. Wacky promptly borrows money from team publicity man Updyke to buy $300 worth.

In the grandstand, catcher Hippo Jones's wife Hazel and the other women are concerned. Wacky is the best pitcher in baseball when he concentrates on what he's doing, but whenever a pretty girl turns his head, a distracted Wacky suddenly can't throw the ball over the plate. The wives want the Sox to be in the World Series so their husbands will receive bonus money.

Sure enough, Wacky's infatuation with Pepita begins a run of bad luck for him and the Sox at the ballpark. On the train, the wives protest until Wacky discloses that he and Pepita secretly ran off to get married. While they are happy for the couple, Hazel schemes to have a Hollywood producer require Pepita's presence to shoot a movie there. This could keep Wacky focused on baseball until the World Series.

Pepita finishes the film faster than expected. She hurries to Kansas City to see Wacky and the Sox, so the wives take matters into their own hands, tying up Pepita in a hotel room. Wacky eventually wins the World Series for the Sox, but this time, it's only because the woman he loves is there.

== Cast ==
- Lupe Vélez as Pepita Zorita
- Eddie Albert as Wacky Waters
- Patsy Kelly as Hazel Jones
- Max Baer as Hippo Jones
- Jerome Cowan as Updyke
- Iris Adrian as Kitty McClouen
- Joan Barclay as Joan Samuels
- Cliff Clark as Dan Hannigan
- Carmen Morales as Marianna D'Angelo
- George Cleveland as Doc
- Jack Briggs as Marty Samuels
- Russ Clark as Smokey Lee
- Nedrick Young as Tony D'Angelo
- Eddie Dew as Spike McClouen
- Tom Kennedy as Dugan
- Ralph Sanford as First Umpire

== Reception ==
Variety said "Despite the usual 'Mexican Spitfire' series continues on with Lupe Velez, but in this one there is no reference to the old 'Spitfire' tag. 'Ladies Day' represents considerable improvement over the old formula. It has more capable people, more action and more comedy. Film is a 'B Special' and should do well when coupled with a strong entry on twinners."

== See also ==
- List of baseball films
