= Down Missouri Way =

1946 film

- Theatrical release poster
- Directed by: Josef Berne
- Screenplay by: Sam Neuman
- Produced by: Josef Berne
- Starring: Martha O'Driscoll; John Carradine; Eddie Dean; William Wright; Roscoe Karns; Renee Godfrey
- Cinematography: Vincent J. Farrar
- Edited by: W. Donn Hayes
- Production company: Producers Releasing Corporation
- Distributed by: Producers Releasing Corporation
- Release date: August 15, 1946
- Running time: 75 minutes
- Country: United States
- Language: English

Down Missouri Way is a 1946 American musical film directed by Josef Berne and written by Sam Neuman. The film stars Martha O'Driscoll, John Carradine, Eddie Dean, William Wright, Roscoe Karns and Renee Godfrey. The film was released on August 15, 1946, by Producers Releasing Corporation.

== Plot ==
An agricultural professor and her scientifically-raised mule get caught up in a film shoot in the Ozarks farming community. The mule is featured in the film and the professor and producer fall for each other to the chagrin of the film's lead.

== Cast ==
- Martha O'Driscoll as Jane Colwell
- John Carradine as Thorndyke 'Thorny' P. Dunning
- Eddie Dean as Mortimer
- William Wright as Mike Burton
- Roscoe Karns as Press Agent
- Renee Godfrey as Gloria Baxter
- Mabel Todd as Cindy
- Eddie Craven as Sam
- Chester Clute as Prof. Shaw
- Will Wright as Prof. Morris
- Paul Scardon as Prof. Lewis
- Earle Hodgins as Press Agent
- The Tailor Maids as Singing Group
- The Notables as Singing Group
