= Ann Carter =

American actress (1936–2014)

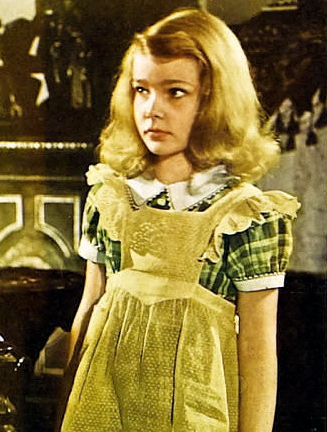
- Carter in The Curse of the Cat People (1944)
- Born: Ann Lois Carter; June 16, 1936; Syracuse, New York, U.S.
- Died: January 27, 2014 (aged 77); North Bend, Washington, U.S.
- Resting place: Tahoma National Cemetery
- Education: Occidental College
- Occupations: Child actress, teacher
- Years active: 1941–1952
- Spouse: Crosby Newton (m. 1957)
- Children: 3

Ann Carter (June 16, 1936 – January 27, 2014) was an American child actress who worked with dozens of film stars, compiling an "unimaginably distinguished résumé" despite an acting career which lasted only slightly more than a decade. She is best known for her starring role as Amy Reed in the film The Curse of the Cat People (1944), and also acted alongside stars including Humphrey Bogart, Katharine Hepburn, Bing Crosby, Fredric March, and Barbara Stanwyck among others.

== Early life and acting career ==
Carter was born in Syracuse, New York. At the age of three she moved with her mother Nancy to Palm Springs, California for the benefit of Nancy's health. Her father, Bert Carter, was an executive with the Dodge division of Chrysler Corporation (working there for 38 years) and commuted back and forth between California and Detroit "where he was working for Chrysler on defense-related projects." After briefly residing with her maternal Aunt Stell (short for Estelle) and Uncle Jack in Glendale, California, on Idlewood Road, Carter and her mother moved "to a place near Olympic and Robertson in West Los Angeles, with [her father] there again part-time."

Carter's mother "had always been very interested in the theater," but was disallowed from pursuing her own career by her own father, Ann's grandfather. According to her mother, Ann was discovered at the age of four while she was living in Los Angeles. As she and her mother were riding on a bus, Carter explains:

[. . .] someone from 20th Century-Fox saw me and told my mom that I should be introduced to producer-director Herbert Brenon. I was and, through Mr. Brenon, I got to try out for a one-line part in Fox's Last of the Duanes... – and I got the part!

Some 60 years later, Carter confesses that she doesn't recall much personally about Last of the Duanes, which was shot in April–May, 1941, but was subsequently told what happened by her "very focused" mother.

In her first fantasy film, and most notable early role, she played Veronica Lake's young daughter in I Married a Witch (1942), an experience which "made [a big] impression" on the then-five year old actress. A scene she remembers clearly, which later "ended up on the cutting room floor," she flew down a staircase on a broomstick, specially fitted with a little seat crafted specifically for her. She also recalls the make-up artists "combing my hair over one eye to make me look like Veronica Lake," known for her 'Peek-A-Boo' hairstyle.

In one amusing incident, Carter beat out her contemporary Margaret O'Brien for a part because her mother had dressed her in white gloves. During the interview with the movie's makers, O'Brien became so distracted by Carter's gloves that she muffed the interview.

== Increasing film roles ==
Her first significant role came at age six, when she appeared in Commandos Strike at Dawn (1942) playing a young Norwegian girl whose father, played by actor Paul Muni, led a fishing village in resistance to the occupation of the German army during World War II. Much of the filming took place in Mill Bay, British Columbia, Canada which doubled for the Norwegian fjords, during the summer of 1942. Ann and the other cast and crew members stayed at the famous Empress Hotel in Victoria. Carter recalls:

That was during the war and, because of fear of a Japanese attack, there were little boats in the harbor, right in front of the Empress [Hotel], in case we had to evacuate.

Although it was clearly a wartime propaganda film, it was based on a story by the noted British writer C. S. Forester with a screenplay by the American writer Irwin Lewis. The cast included Sir Cedric Hardwicke and Lillian Gish, while Carter recalls that the cast filmed some scenes on the Prince David ship, whose crew of British Commandos "dressed up as Germans" for the purposes of the film. Carter's "other war movie" The North Star (1943) saw her appear alongside Ann Harding and Anne Baxter acting in "a Russian village... constructed on the Goldwyn lot." Carter recalls that:

My co-star, Farley Granger, and I were offered contracts with Goldwyn after that movie, but they never picked up the option – because, around that time Sam Goldwyn discovered Danny Kaye!

Her most substantial film role came when the seven-year-old Carter played the part of Amy Reed in the classic fantasy The Curse of the Cat People (1944). Val Lewton, the film's producer, was friendly with Stanley Kramer, the nephew of Carter's agent, Earl Kramer. Carter played the lonely and imaginative child who is unable to relate to the prosaic activities of her schoolmates, in a role described by Weaver as making her "practically the star" after only "a few small, sometimes uncredited parts." It was a role she could identify with, being herself "a little bit of a dreamer" who enjoyed fantasy and was, like her character, an only child.

Carter found filming The Curse of the Cat People "fascinating... because of the set. It was all shot on a set at RKO" barring a few exterior shots, which was cycled through the seasons by "guys on the catwalks throwing leaves which drifted down" or "throwing gypsum and un-toasted corn flakes out of boxes" (for snow), a novel (and "absolutely beautiful") experience to the young Carter. She recalls of her mother, that:

[. . .] [f]or every movie, she would first talk about the whole picture, the whole idea, the whole plot, so that I understood, so that I was not just some little parrot reciting lines.

This knowledge of the whole story added to "the fact that I was on a set with a lot of other people" meant that Carter was "never afraid" despite the forbidding and intimidating sets (and cast). Carter worked for 32 of the 33 days of filming, under two directors (Gunther von Fritsch and Robert Wise), but "felt no pressure" over the exacting schedule. Never expecting or aspiring to be a star, she credits her parents with keeping her "normal" and grounded. On the schooling that occurred "now and then on a set," Carter recalls it being "great... because most times it was one-on-one," thinking that "you learn more, one-on-one, whether it's just 15 minutes at a time or whatever it is."

Carter appeared in a number of other movies, a high point being when she played Humphrey Bogart's daughter in the 1947 thriller The Two Mrs. Carrolls (actually filmed in 1945 then shelved for two years), which supposedly earned her an award for best juvenile performer, although Carter "doesn't personally recall ever receiving one." Carter cites her scenes with Bogart and co-star Barbara Stanwyck as particular high points during her career, recalling that she and Bogart "got along so well... he was a really nice man; a very warm, nice man." He nicknamed her "Tonsils" when she yawned in his face during a rehearsal, and "he peered into my mouth, down my throat, and... it was "Tonsils" after that."

Despite the good reviews for Curse of the Cat People, Carter lapsed back into smaller and often uncredited roles afterward, although she says that she "didn't think about it then at all," and assumes that perhaps "the parts just didn't come up." Unbilled in her other two fantasy films, she recalls A Connecticut Yankee in King Arthur's Court as:

[. . .] a lot of fun because it was Bing Crosby and William Bendix, and they were un-be-liev-a-ble together... [they] ruined so much film, because we'd start filming and they would start clowning around, and they were hysterical! Of course, the footage was not usable, but it was fun!

Carter also did many Lux Radio Theater programs, from the age of eleven, including playing Cary Grant's daughter in the radio adaptation of Mr. Blandings Builds His Dream House. She also "had a disc jockey show on KFWB for a while."

== Post-acting years ==
Carter left acting after she contracted polio, which she believes she contracted "over the Fourth of July [1948] vacation," when she, her parents and some friends went on a boat to Catalina Island. She believes that the incubation period of polio – a scourge among children of the time – corresponded to her swimming in contaminated water from the boat. Initially diagnosed with summer flu, Carter thought she was over her symptoms when, during filming on The Member of the Wedding, director Fred Zinnemann noticed her "'leaning to port'," and it was discovered that "the muscles were all gone down one side of [her] back." After an electromyogram at Memorial Hospital in Los Angeles, and physical therapy and swimming (at the Hollywood Athletic Club), she was strengthened enough to "carry around a cast, [which was] huge and weighed 55 pounds."

During her recovery from polio, Carter's parents "helped bring Lawrence Welk to prominence," when Dodge, the automobile corporation, was "looking for someone to sponsor on television" c.1950/51. Carter's mother was "all excited about The Lawrence Welk Show, which she thought was wonderful," convincing her husband to "present that as a good idea for Dodge to sponsor." Although her father "was not a 'music person'," Carter recalls that "at my mother's constant nagging about it... he recommended" the program and "Dodge wound up sponsoring it." In return, when Carter's father retired from Dodge, both of her parents "retired out to Lawrence Welk's Country Club Village in Escondido, California, a mobile home park which they managed for [him for] years."

=== Teaching ===
After largely recovering from polio, Carter attended Occidental College, Los Angeles, her acting earnings paid both for her medical care, and college education. She recalls that:

My agent Earl Kramer called while I was in college and wanted me to go on an interview for the movie Not as a Stranger (1955) and I said I couldn't because I had a final that day.

Having made this decision – which she says "was not taken well by him [Kramer] nor by my mother" – she decided she wanted to teach and have a family rather than return to acting. In retrospect, Carter acknowledges that this decision "just about broke my mother's heart," who was so involved in her daughter's career and felt that she should have continued to act.

During her graduate year at college, Carter married Crosby Newton (May 23, 1957), and the "next year, [she] started teaching... [at] high school and junior high," also spending time as a substitute teacher. She particularly enjoyed "teaching continuation high school, and of course [her] ninth grade drama class, where [her class] put on various productions." Following the death of her parents (her mother died in 1977, her father in 1979), having no more ties to California, Carter left teaching in Southern California in 1982, and she and her husband decided to relocate to the Pacific Northwest. They settled in the eastern suburbs of Seattle, having "always loved it up in [that] part of the world... since [filming] Commandos Strike at Dawn." In Washington, Carter attended travel school and became "a cruise-only travel agent," which she did for four years. An odd rumour that Carter was "killed in an automobile accident in 1978" is definitively false, but nonetheless persisted.

A mother of three – to Gail, David and Carol – Carter retired, in part to help care for her grandchildren, allowing her children and their partners to work. In January 2005, she was diagnosed with Stage 3 ovarian cancer, which she found "awful." Finding "hope and a very, very aggressive chemo treatment" from Dr Saul Rivkin at the Swedish Cancer Institute in Seattle, she got through it "with help from [her] family and friends." In 2007 she participated in Val Lewton: The Man in the Shadows, a documentary on the producer behind Curse of the Cat People, which was "exciting," but also allowed her to learn "a lot about [Lewton]'s life" which was a sad story.

== Death ==
Carter died on January 27, 2014, in North Bend, Washington, after a long bout with ovarian cancer. She was 77. Her husband Stephen Crosby Newton (April 9, 1934 – November 4, 2014) served as a Specialist 4 in the United States Army. They were interred together at Tahoma National Cemetery.

== Legacy ==
One film historian called Carter "the serious faced little blonde". Although she was a beautiful child, she did not play in films aimed at children or in light topics. In her best roles, she is a vulnerable child trapped in a hostile adult world. She was hailed by director Robert Wise as a "big asset" in his directorial debut. In 1991 he said:

I'm always struck [when watching The Curse of the Cat People] by how good she is and how consistent her performance is through the whole film. Ann Carter just had one of those marvellous bits of chemistry for the screen that some actors have. She just clicked on the screen and that was it... she was very responsive and very quick.

In 2008, convicted (in 2013) murderer and Rockefeller impersonator, German-born Christian Gerhartsreiter, claimed that Carter was his mother when he was arrested for custodial kidnapping. Carter denied this and expressed sympathy for his real mother, Irmgard Gerhartsreiter, who had not seen her son since he left Germany in 1978.

== Filmography ==
Year	Title	Role	Notes
1941	The Last of the Duanes	Lucy Cannon	Uncredited
1942	I Married a Witch	Jennifer Wooley, Wooley's Daughter	Uncredited
1942	Commandos Strike at Dawn	Solveig Toresen	Uncredited
1943	The North Star	Olga Pavlov	Alternative title: Armored Attack
1944	The Curse of the Cat People	Amy Reed	
1944	And Now Tomorrow	Emily - Age 7	Uncredited
1945	Incendiary Blonde	Pearl Guinan - Age 7	Uncredited
1946	The Virginian	School Girl	Uncredited
1946	The Searching Wind	Sarah Hazen	
1946	Child of Divorce	Peggy Allen	
1947	The Fabulous Dorseys	Young Jane	Uncredited
1947	The Two Mrs. Carrolls	Beatrice Carroll	
1947	Song of Love	Marie	
1948	Ruthless	Martha Burnside, as Child	
1948	The Boy with Green Hair	Eva	Uncredited
1949	A Connecticut Yankee in King Arthur's Court	Peasant girl	
1949	Blondie Hits the Jackpot	Louise Hutchins	
1952	The Member of the Wedding	Doris - Club Girl	Uncredited

== Bibliography ==
- Best, Marc. Those Endearing Young Charms: Child Performers of the Screen. South Brunswick and New York: Barnes & Co., 1971, pp. 25–29.
