= The Two Mrs. Carrolls =

1947 film by Peter Godfrey

- Theatrical release poster
- Directed by: Peter Godfrey
- Screenplay by: Thomas Job
- Based on: The Two Mrs. Carrolls a 1935 play by Martin Vale
- Produced by: Mark Hellinger
- Starring: Humphrey Bogart; Barbara Stanwyck; Alexis Smith; Nigel Bruce
- Cinematography: Peverell Marley
- Edited by: Frederick Richards
- Music by: Franz Waxman
- Production company: Warner Bros. Pictures
- Distributed by: Warner Bros. Pictures
- Release date: March 4, 1947 (United States)
- Running time: 99 minutes
- Country: United states
- Language: English
- Budget: $1,428,000
- Box office: $2.5 million (US rentals) or $3,569,000

The Two Mrs. Carrolls is a 1947 American mystery film noir directed by Peter Godfrey and starring Humphrey Bogart, Barbara Stanwyck, and Alexis Smith. It was produced by Mark Hellinger from a screenplay by Thomas Job, based on the 1935 play of the same name by Martin Vale (a pseudonym of Marguerite Vale Veiller).

== Plot ==
While on vacation in Scotland, Sally Morton learns that her lover of two weeks, painter Geoffrey Carroll, is married to an invalid wife, prompting Sally to end their romance. Back in London with his wife and pre-teen daughter, Beatrice ("Bea"), Geoffrey paints his wife's portrait, depicting her as the Angel of Death. He buys poison from chemist Horace Blagdon, signing the register with a false name.

Two years later, Geoffrey's first wife has died, and he is married to Sally, living in a small town in the mansion she inherited from her father. Although Geoffrey is a successful artist, lately he has been uninspired. Sally’s former fiancé, lawyer Charles "Penny" Pennington, visits, introducing his wealthy client, Mrs. Latham, and Cecily, her beautiful daughter. The strong-willed and seductive Cecily asks Geoffrey to paint her portrait and lures him into an affair. Blagdon, in debt from betting on horses, tracks down Geoffrey and blackmails him.

Months later, Sally has been suffering from intermittent weakness and headaches for three weeks, but intends to host a dinner party that evening. Dr. Tuttle, the alcoholic local physician, believes she is just suffering from nerves. Visiting in secret, Cecily informs Geoffrey that she is leaving for South America in two days, urging him to go with her.

Before the dinner party, Geoffrey makes an excuse to go to London to see Blagdon, who has demanded additional blackmail money. Sally is surprised to find Bea packing for boarding school, since Geoffrey has not mentioned sending her away. As Sally helps her stepdaughter pack, Bea tells a story that indicates her mother was not an invalid. Confused, Sally presses the issue, and Bea relates that her mother was well until shortly after Geoffrey returned from his trip to Scotland, when her mother began to suffer from symptoms very similar to those Sally is experiencing. Sally now suspects Geoffrey has been poisoning her nightly bedtime glasses of milk. Before leaving, Bea suggests they take a look at Sally's portrait that Geoffrey has been working on but will not let anyone see. Entering Geoffrey's studio, they are both shocked to discover a painting depicting Sally as the Angel of Death. Meanwhile, Geoffrey, who was only able to raise part of the money Blagdon demanded, responds to the chemist's threats by beating him to death.

The dinner party goes on without Geoffrey, who returns home just as the guests are leaving. Privately he tells Cecily he is going to tell Sally about their affair and accompany Cecily to South America. After the maid and Bea leave for boarding school, Geoffrey brings Sally her milk. While Geoffrey answers the phone, Sally quickly pours the milk out the window, spilling some in her haste. Spotting the spilled milk, Geoffrey realizes Sally is aware. Inspired by a newspaper article on a series of local burglaries that may be tied to a notorious strangler, Geoffrey ransacks the living room before going outside to stage a break into the house. Sally locks him out and calls Penny to summon the police before Geoffrey cuts the telephone line. Geoffrey breaks in through the window and informs the terrified Sally that she must die because she no longer inspires his work. He has found a new muse, which he admits happened once before. Geoffrey begins to choke Sally as Penny arrives outside with two police officers. Penny rushes to Sally’s rescue, and the officers lead Geoffrey away. On the staircase, Geoffrey asks if they would like a glass of milk, but the officers shake their heads.

== Cast ==
- Humphrey Bogart as Geoffrey Carroll
- Barbara Stanwyck as Sally Morton Carroll
- Alexis Smith as Cecily Latham
- Nigel Bruce as Dr. Tuttle
- Isobel Elsom as Mrs. Latham
- Patrick O'Moore as Charles "Penny" Pennington
- Ann Carter as Beatrice "Bea" Carroll, Geoffrey's daughter
- Anita Sharp-Bolster as Christine, Sally's maid
- Barry Bernard as Horace Blagdon, a pharmacist and blackmailer
- Colin Campbell as MacGregor (uncredited)

The film's director, Peter Godfrey, appears uncredited as the man selling a tip on a horse at the racetrack.

== Production ==
"Martin Vale" was a pseudonym of Marguerite Vale Veiller, the wife of writer Bayard Veiller. Her play, The Two Mrs. Carrolls, opened in London in 1935, and, rewritten, moved to Broadway in 1943. A huge Broadway success, the play ran for 585 performances from August 3, 1943 to February 3, 1945. The original Broadway production starred Elisabeth Bergner as Sally, with Victor Jory as Geoffrey, Margery Maude as Mrs. Latham, Philip Tonge as Dr. Tuttle, and Irene Worth as Cecily.

Elisabeth Bergner won high praise for her portrayal of Sally Morton Carroll on the stage. In 1944, she won The Drama League's Delia Austrian Medal for Distinguished Performance for The Two Mrs. Carrolls. During the run of the play, a shy girl showed up at the stage door night after night to speak with Bergner, and Bergner eventually became a mentor to the girl, sponsored her career in the theater, and won her a role as an understudy in The Two Mrs. Carrolls. The girl eventually undercut Bergner's career, and the incident became the basis for the short story "The Wisdom of Eve" (1946) by Mary Orr, which was adapted for the movie All About Eve (1950).

In the summer of 1944, Warner Bros. Pictures paid $225,000 for the film rights to the play. Before a screenwriter had even been assigned to the project, Warners announced that Bette Davis would star as Sally Carroll, and Jesse L. Lasky would produce. Meanwhile, Warners also purchased the rights to the Ayn Rand novel The Fountainhead, and announced Mervyn LeRoy would direct the film adaptation, and Humphrey Bogart and Barbara Stanwyck would star in it.

The Two Mrs. Carrolls was significantly altered for the film. In the play, the first Mrs. Carroll is not murdered in the first act, but, rather, lives (off-stage) until the third act, and telephones Sally to warn her that Geoffrey is attempting to poison her. This provides a major shock to the audience, which had no reason to suspect Geoffrey. In the screenplay, the first Mrs. Carroll dies (off-screen) minutes into the film, and suspense replaces shock, as Sally slowly begins to suspect her husband of murder. William Faulkner worked on an early treatment of the play.

Stanwyck and Bogart as Mr. and Mrs. Carroll.

Some time in the latter half of 1944, Warners announced that Ida Lupino and Zachary Scott would star in The Two Mrs. Carrolls. On November 12, however, the studio said Barbara Stanwyck would star alongside Paul Henreid, and that Robert Buckner would produce the film. Then, on February 9, 1945, the studio announced that it was placing its production of The Fountainhead on hold due to the high cost and unavailability of materials to construct the large architectural sets for the film. The studio also announced it had recast The Two Mrs. Carrolls with Humphrey Bogart and Barbara Stanwyck.

According to Stanwyck biographer Axel Madsen, Stanwyck agreed to do the film out of boredom, as her husband, Robert Taylor, was serving in the U.S. military in World War II, and, although the war in Europe was clearly ending, she knew he would not return to the United States for many months. Another reason Stanwyck agreed to do the film is that she had become close friends with director Peter Godfrey after working with him on the Christmas comedy Christmas in Connecticut, which was filmed in 1944. Stanwyck biographer Dan Callahan has argued that Stanwyck's friendship with Godfrey blinded her to his shortcomings as a director, which were significant. Film historian Edmund Bansak notes that The Two Mrs. Carrolls was written as a vehicle for Stanwyck, which may also explain her willingness to star in the picture, but Bogart biographer Richard Gehman challenges this claim, saying the rights to the play were purchased so Bogart could star in the film adaptation.

Although the studio assigned a B movie director and producer to the film, it hired A-list stars, and the film had an A-list budget. Filming lasted from April to June 1945, with a brief hiatus in the production to accommodate the honeymoon of Bogart, who married Lauren Bacall on May 21. Almost all of the filming took place at the Warner Bros. studio on sets designed by Warners' veteran set designer Anton Grot. Painter John Decker produced the two portraits seen in the film.

Bogart and Stanwyck had a friendly relationship on set. Producer Mark Hellinger, whom Bogart liked very much, announced that Bogart would not be seen in any painter's outfits that would appear unmasculine, so, when a painter's smock and beret with a tassel showed up on his wardrobe rack one day, the actor was furious. It turned out that the smock and beret were a joke perpetrated by Stanwyck, and the two performers had a good laugh afterward.

Warner Bros. did not immediately release The Two Mrs. Carrolls after it was completed, and there are different theories about the reason for the delay. Turner Classic Movies reviewer Jeremy Arnold stated it was because of the film's strong similarity to the 1944 film Gaslight, but film historian Richard Schickel has said it was because Warners hoped Bogart's rising popularity as a Hollywood star would help overcome his awful performance in the film. Then, the song "Open the Door, Richard" became popular, with five versions being released in 1946 and 1947. The studio reportedly considered cutting or refilming the scene in which Bogart pounds on Stanwyck's bedroom door, demanding that she open it, but ultimately left it unchanged.

The Two Mrs. Carrolls was finally released in the United States on March 4, 1947. Warners had a relatively poor marketing campaign for the picture. Theater owners were asked to promote the film by holding contests in which female patrons were to decide whether they looked more like Barbara Stanwyck or Alexis Smith.

== Themes ==
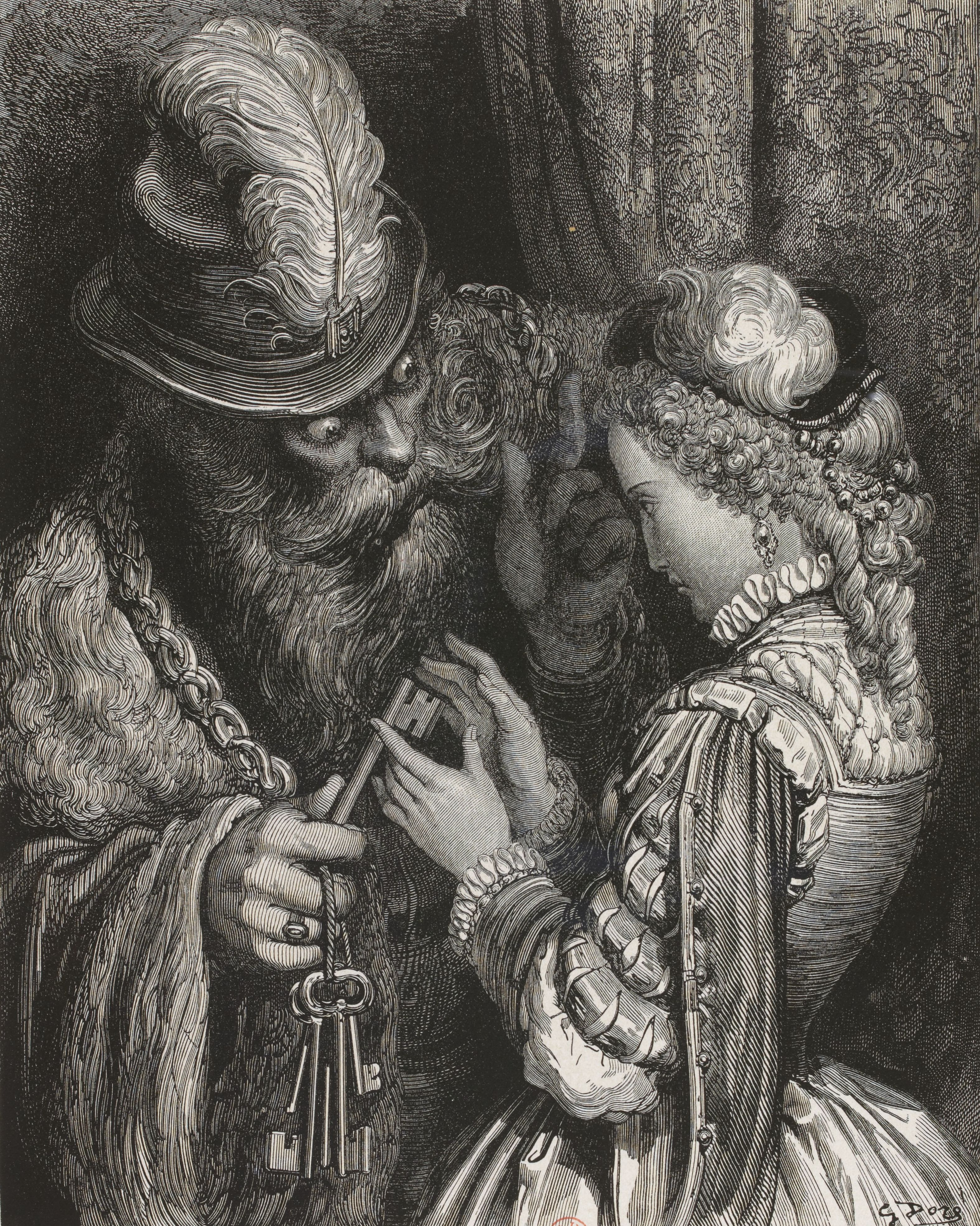
The legend of Bluebeard (depicted) is one of several themes in The Two Mrs. Carrolls.

Painting, portraiture, and art play major roles in The Two Mrs. Carrolls. Many scholars have noted the similarity between Edgar Allan Poe's short story "The Oval Portrait" and this film. In Poe's story, a man obsessively paints his wife's realistic portrait for weeks only to discover that she has died during the process and her spirit now inhabits the painting. Similarly, Geoffrey Carroll begins obsessively painting his wives as "angels of death" before killing them. The Two Mrs. Carrolls is also one of several murder/mystery films and film noirs—such as A Double Life (1947), Experiment Perilous (1943), Gaslight (1944), Laura (1944), The Paradine Case (1947), The Picture of Dorian Gray (1945), Rebecca (1940), Scarlet Street (1945), A Woman's Vengeance (1947)—made in the 1940s in which a portrait (usually of a woman) plays a major role, by obsessing a character, by depicting a clue to a mystery, by summoning bad memories, by acting as a catalyst for action, or through some other means.

More specifically, The Two Mrs. Carrolls positions the image of a woman as emasculating. The film depicts Geoffrey Carroll as being able to paint only when engaged in immoral behavior, such as adultery or murder. A happy relationship with a healthy, active woman is debilitating, and he turns toward adultery to solve his problem. The more powerful his paintings of women become, the more he sinks into madness (and murder). Film theorist Helen Hanson pointed out that any image of a strong, happy woman not only undercuts Carroll's artistic abilities, but also drives him insane. A corollary theme running through the film is the idea of art as demasculinizing. Film historian Philip Hayward observed that the picture goes to excessive lengths to denigrate art and artists. Christine, the Carrolls' housekeeper, judgmentally sneers, "When you work for an artist, you can expect just about anything." A rich visitor to the Carroll mansion denigrates Geoffrey's art by caustically declaring that "The man is an art critic — the women are normal people." In its publicity campaign for the picture, Warner Bros. played up Bogart's masculine screen image in order to counter any idea that his role might be effeminate.

Paranoia is another theme running through the film. Although Sally Morton knows that Geoffrey Carroll is a liar, having learned in the film's opening minutes that he has lied about his marital status, she nevertheless agrees to marry him. She does not begin to suspect her husband may be poisoning her until after a conversation with her step-daughter about the death of the first Mrs. Carroll, but her paranoia becomes the dominant theme of the last half of the film. In this regard, as film scholar Mary Ann Doane pointed out, The Two Mrs. Carrolls is one of the many "paranoid women's films" that were common in the 1940s. These include Caught (1949), Dragonwyck (1946), Experiment Perilous (1944), Gaslight (1944), Jane Eyre (1943), The Locket (1946), Secret Beyond the Door (1948), and The Spiral Staircase (1946). Doane argued these films are evocative of an era in which men felt their roles as breadwinners and as workers in industry being supplanted by women due to the need for war industry workers.

Several film scholars have noted that The Two Mrs. Carrolls clearly evokes the Bluebeard legend. A French folk tale, the Bluebeard legend tells the tale of a hideously ugly man who has married many times, each wife mysteriously disappearing. When his pretty young new bride discovers that he has murdered his previous spouses, Bluebeard attempts to kill her, but she is saved by the intervention of relatives.

== Box office ==
The Two Mrs. Carrolls did poorly at the box office. According to Warner Bros. records, the film earned $2,292,000 in the U.S. and $1,277,000 in other markets.

== Critical reception ==
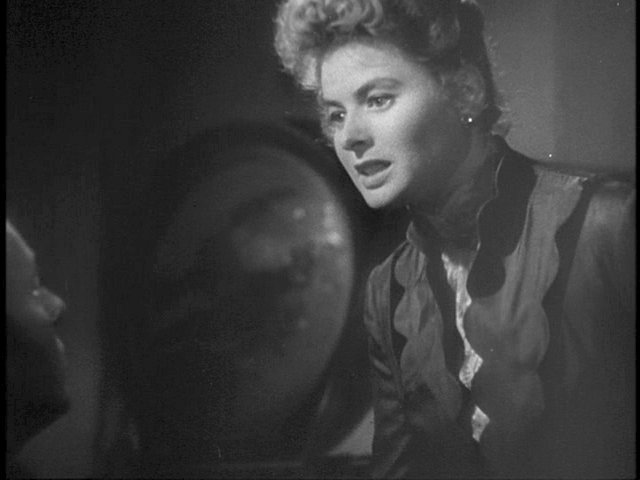
Some reviewers said The Two Mrs. Carrolls is similar to Gaslight, starring Ingrid Bergman

The film received generally poor reviews in the United States upon its release, and reviewers in the British press found its "quaint old English" atmosphere over the top and amusing. Modern reviewers tend to be highly critical of the film, but some find redeeming elements in it.

Writing in 2001, Stanwyck biographer Axel Madsen's felt Godfrey indulged Bogart as a director, "letting [him] mug outrageously", and thought both Bogart and Stanwyck were miscast and that the script undermined any suspense in the plot by repeatedly alluding to Bogart's madness. He stated that the one well-written and well-acted scene in the film occurs when Stanwyck breaks into Bogart's studio and sees his demonic painting of her. Film historian Daniel Bubbeo, while unhappy with the film's similarities to Gaslight (1944) and Suspicion (1941), praised the scene in which Bogart, in terrifying makeup, crashes through a window to attack Stanwyck. Author Casie Hermansson pointed out that, in particular, the scene in which Bogart climbs a set of stairs to bring Stanwyck a glass of poisoned milk is almost identical to a scene in Suspicion.

In 2012, Stanwyck biographer Dan Callahan called the film a "dreadful adaptation of a derivative stage thriller", and far too similar to Suspicion. He found that Peter Godfrey's direction exhibited "a whole new level of miscalculation and incompetence", and had a very low opinion of the acting. Stanwyck, he concluded, was incongruously chipper early in the film, while giving a stilted, distracted performance in the second half; Bogart was "embarrassing" with his over-acted insanity; Nigel Bruce turned in a similarly hammy performance; and Ann Carter's adult-sounding dialogue was delivered with "lugubrious" slowness.

Film biographer David Quinlan, writing in 1983, concluded that the film's fundamental flaws stem from Godfrey's shortcomings as a director and the miscasting of Bogart as an insane wife-killer. Film reviewer Barry Monush felt the script gave Alexis Smith so little to do that casting her hardly seemed worth it.

Turner Classic Movies reviewer Jeremy Arnold was much more positive about the film, noting that its visuals were quite effective in creating an "impressive Gothic atmosphere. Godfrey uses mysterious lighting, images of blowing curtains and haunting paintings, and sounds of creaking boards, closing doors, and church bells to build suspense and a creepy atmosphere." Sociologist Steve Zimmerman, while noting the film's many shortcomings, said it "manages to hold one's attention". Film historian Edmund Bansak, while acknowledging that Bogart and Stanwyck were miscast, found that Stanwyck stole the show with her performance. He also thought the film well-produced, the musical score by Franz Waxman highly effective, and the scene depicting Stanwyck's discovery of the "angel of death" painting very good.

== Bibliography ==
- Bansak, Edmund G. (1995). Fearing the Dark: The Val Lewton Career. Jefferson, N.C.: McFarland. ISBN 978-0899509693.
- Belton, John (1996). Movies and Mass Culture. New Brunswick, N.J.: Rutgers Univ. Press. ISBN 978-0813522289.
- Bubbeo, Daniel (2001). The Women of Warner Brothers: The Lives and Careers of 15 Leading Ladies, With Filmographies for Each. Jefferson, N.C.: McFarland. ISBN 978-0786411375.
- Callahan, Dan (2012). Barbara Stanwyck: The Miracle Woman. Jackson, Miss: University Press of Mississippi. ISBN 978-1617031830.
- Chandler, Charlotte (2007). The Girl Who Walked Home Alone: Bette Davis, A Personal Biography. New York: Applause Theatre & Cinema Books. ISBN 978-1557837172.
- Cohan, Steven (1997). Masked Men: Masculinity and the Movies in the Fifties. Bloomington, Ind: Indiana University Press. ISBN 978-0253211279.
- Doane, Mary Ann (1987). The Desire to Desire: The Woman's Film of the 1940s. Bloomington, Ind: Indiana University Press. ISBN 978-0253204332.
- Felleman, Susan (2006). Art in the Cinematic Imagination. Austin, Tex: University of Texas Press. ISBN 978-0292709416.
- Gehman, Richard (1965). Bogart: An Intimate Biography. Greenwich, Conn: Fawcett Publications.
- Hanson, Helen (2007). Hollywood Heroines: Women in Film Noir and the Female Gothic Film. New York: I.B. Tauris. ISBN 978-1845115616.
- Hayward, Philip (1998). Picture This: Media Representations of Visual Art and Artists. Luton, U.K.: University of Luton Press. ISBN 978-1860205187.
- Hermansson, Casie (2009). Bluebeard: A Reader's Guide to the English Tradition. Jackson, Miss: University Press of Mississippi. ISBN 978-1604732313.
- Hischak, Thomas S.; Bordman, Gerald Martin (2004). The Oxford Companion to American Theatre. Oxford: Oxford University Press. ISBN 978-0195169867.
- Jordan, Stephen C. (2004). Bohemian Rogue: The Life of Hollywood Artist John Decker. Lanham, Md: Scarecrow Press. ISBN 978-0810851597.
- Madsen, Axel (2001). Stanwyck. San Jose, Ca: iUniverse.com. ISBN 978-0595193981.
- Meyers, Jeffrey (1999). Bogart: A Life in Hollywood. New York: Fromm International. ISBN 978-0880642347.
- Monush, Barry (2003). Screen World Presents the Encyclopedia of Hollywood Film Actors. New York: Applause Theatre and Cinema Books. ISBN 978-1557835512.
- Nollen, Scott Allen (2007). Warners Wiseguys: All 112 Films That Robinson, Cagney and Bogart Made for the Studio. Jefferson, N.C.: McFarland & Co. ISBN 978-0786432622.
- Quinlan, David (1983). The Illustrated Guide to Film Directors. Totowa, N.J.: Barnes & Noble. ISBN 978-0713437805.
- Robards, Brooks (1993). "Excursions into the Biopic, Mystery/Suspense, Melodrama and Movies of the Eighties". In Loukides, Paul; Fuller, Linda K. (eds.). Beyond the Stars: The Material World in American Popular Film. Vol. 3. Bowling Green, Ohio: Bowling Green State University Popular Press. ISBN 978-0-87972-623-2.
- Schickel, Richard (2006). Bogie: A Celebration of the Life and Films of Humphrey Bogart. New York: Thomas Dunne Books. ISBN 978-0312366292.
- Spicer, Andrew (2010). Historical Dictionary of Film Noir. Lanham, Md: Scarecrow Press. ISBN 978-0810859609.
- Zimmerman, Steve (2009). Food in the Movies (2nd ed.). Jefferson, N.C.: McFarland. ISBN 978-0786445462.
