= My Forbidden Past =

1951 film by Robert Stevenson

- Theatrical release poster
- Directed by: Robert Stevenson
- Written by: Leopold Atlas (adaptation)
- Screenplay by: Marion Parsonnet
- Based on: Carriage Entrance; 1947 novel by Polan Banks
- Produced by: Polan Banks; Robert Sparks
- Starring: Robert Mitchum; Ava Gardner; Melvyn Douglas
- Cinematography: Harry J. Wild
- Edited by: George C. Shrader
- Music by: Friedrich Hollaender
- Distributed by: RKO Pictures
- Release dates: April 11, 1951 (Los Angeles); April 25, 1951 (New York)
- Running time: 70 minutes
- Country: United States
- Language: English
- Box office: $1,150,000 (U.S. rentals)

My Forbidden Past is a 1951 American historical drama film directed by Robert Stevenson and starring Robert Mitchum and Ava Gardner. The screenplay was written by Marion Parsonnet based on an adaptation by Leopold Atlas of Polan Banks' novel Carriage Entrance.

== Plot ==
In 1890s New Orleans, Dr. Mark Lucas wrongly believes that Barbara Beaurevel has refused and betrayed him after they had planned to elope. Mark returns from South America accompanied by Corinne, a woman whom he married for her beauty but not for love, still carrying a grudge against Barbara. Upon learning of Corinne, Barbara is disappointed but is determined to regain Mark's love. Barbara, already having inherited a large sum from her grandmother of ill social repute, bribes her cousin Paul to seduce Corinne and destroy the marriage. The plan results in Corinne's accidental death, with Mark suspected of murder. Barbara, realizing her insidious act at the trial, confesses all.

== Cast ==
- Robert Mitchum as Dr. Mark Lucas
- Ava Gardner as Barbara Beaurevel
- Melvyn Douglas as Paul Beaurevel
- Lucile Watson as Aunt Eula Beaurevel
- Janis Carter as Corinne Lucas
- Gordon Oliver as Clay Duchesne
- Basil Ruysdael as Dean Cazzley
- Clarence Muse as Pompey
- Walter Kingsford as Coroner
- Jack Briggs as Cousin Philippe
- Will Wright as Luther Toplady

== Production ==
The film was to star Ann Sheridan, whose RKO Pictures contract permitted her to approve her costar. The studio claimed that she refused all of the names that were presented to her and terminated the contract, replacing her with Ava Gardner. Sheridan, who was to have been paid $150,000 and 10% of the film's net profits, sued RKO for $350,000, and the case ended in a February 1951 jury verdict awarding her $55,162, the minimum amount that she would have earned for the production plus $5,162 for costs. Sheridan claimed to have suggested Robert Mitchum for the male lead but that the studio did not present his name for her approval.

Nicholas Ray was originally assigned to direct, but he preferred the In a Lonely Place project and was reassigned to it. Robert Stevenson expressed a desire to direct the film and replaced Ray. The film was slated to begin production in August 1951 but was delayed until October because of Sheridan's dismissal. Filming wrapped by mid-November. Throughout production, the film's working title was Carriage Entrance, but it was changed to My Forbidden Past shortly before its release.

== Reception ==
In a contemporary review for The New York Times, critic A. H. Weiler called the film "a cloyingly saccharine saga" and wrote: "The principals are properly picturesque in period costumes, but the lines they speak as well as their troubled romances are obvious and often dreary affairs. ... Ava Gardner, who plays the lovelorn Barbara, is quite fetching in the décolleté gowns of the era although her portrayal of that harried lady cannot be listed as the best of her professional career. As the Yankee 'germ detective,' Robert Mitchum's characterization is somewhat wooden."

The film recorded a loss of $700,000.
