= Walter Reed (actor) =

American actor (1916–2001)

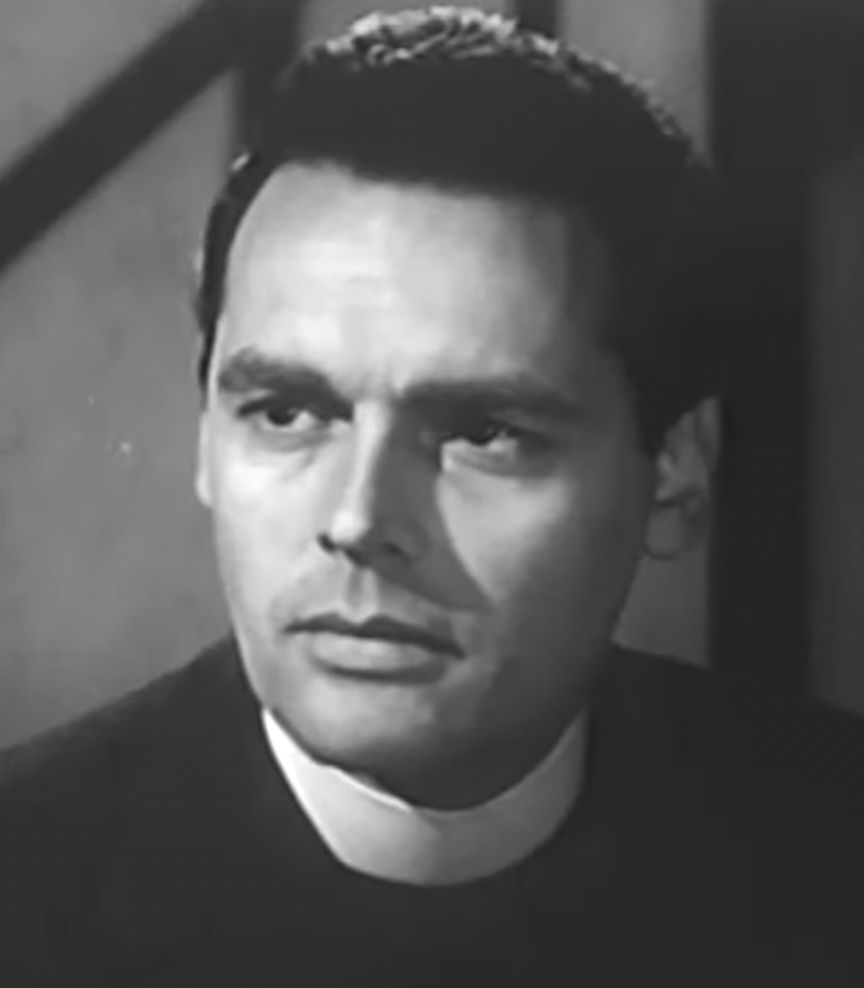
- Reed in The Sun Sets at Dawn (1950)
- Born: Walter Reed Smith; February 10, 1916; Fort Ward, Washington, U.S.
- Died: August 20, 2001 (aged 85); Santa Cruz, California, U.S.
- Occupation: Actor
- Years active: 1925–1972
- Spouse: Elizabeth Boyer Bryce (m. 1937; died 1988)
- Children: 3

Walter Reed (born Walter Reed Smith, February 10, 1916 – August 20, 2001) was an American stage, film and television actor.

== Biography ==
Reed was born in 1916 in Fort Ward, Washington. Following a stint as a Broadway actor, Reed broke into films in 1941. He appeared in several features for RKO Radio Pictures, including the last two Mexican Spitfire comedies (in which Reed replaced Buddy Rogers as the Spitfire's husband). Perhaps his most memorable role was as the spineless wagon driver husband of Gail Russell in the western Seven Men from Now. Reed also appeared in the very first Superman theatrical feature film Superman and the Mole Men in 1951.

In 1951 Reed made two film serials for Republic Pictures; Reed strongly resembled former Republic leading man Ralph Byrd, enabling Republic to insert old action scenes of Byrd into the new Reed footage. Republic wanted to sign Reed for additional serials but Reed declined, preferring not to be type cast as a serial star.

After appearing in 90 films and numerous television programs, such as The Lone Ranger, Perry Mason, John Payne's The Restless Gun, and Gunsmoke (as Joe Garrett in 1957, series 2, episode 22), Reed changed careers and became a real estate investor and broker in Santa Cruz, California in the late 1960s.

== Selected filmography ==
- Redskin (1929) - Indian Boy (uncredited)
- My Favorite Spy (1942) - Nightclub Patron (uncredited)
- The Mayor of 44th Street (1942) - Lou Luddy
- Mexican Spitfire's Elephant (1942) - Dennis Lindsay
- Army Surgeon (1942) - Dr. Bill Drake
- Seven Days' Leave (1942) - Ralph Bell
- Bombardier (1943) - Jim Carter
- Mexican Spitfire's Blessed Event (1943) - Dennis Lindsay
- Petticoat Larceny (1943) - Bill Morgan
- The Bamboo Blonde (1946) - Montgomery, Magazine Reporter (uncredited)
- Child of Divorce (1946) - Michael Benton
- Banjo (1947) - Dr. Bob
- Night Song (1947) - Jimmy
- Western Heritage (1948) - Joe Powell
- Return of the Bad Men (1948) - Bob Dalton
- Mystery in Mexico (1948) - Glenn Ames
- Angel on the Amazon (1948) - Jerry Adams
- Fighter Squadron (1948) - Capt. Duke Chappell
- Captain China (1950) - Martin
- Young Man with a Horn (1950) - Jack Chandler
- The Eagle and the Hawk (1950) - Jones
- The Torch (1950) - Dr. Robert Stanley
- The Lawless (1950) - Jim Wilson
- Flying Disc Man from Mars (1950, Serial) - Kent Fowler
- The Sun Sets at Dawn (1950) - The Chaplain
- Tripoli (1950) - Wade
- Charlie's Haunt (1950) - Larry (uncredited)
- Go for Broke! (1951) - Captain (uncredited)
- Wells Fargo Gunmaster (1951) - Ed Hines
- Government Agents vs. Phantom Legion (1951, Serial) - Hal Duncan
- The Racket (1951) - Policeman at Roll Call & in Locker Room (uncredited)
- Superman and the Mole-Men (1951) - Bill Corrigan
- Submarine Command (1951) - Chief O'Flynn
- Bronco Buster (1952) - Fred Wharton, Phoenix Announcer (uncredited)
- Target (1952) - Martin Conroy
- Red Ball Express (1952) - Major (uncredited)
- Desert Passage (1952) - John Carver
- Caribbean Gold (1952) - Evans, MacAllister's Foreman
- Horizons West (1952) - Layton
- Thunderbirds (1952) - Lt. Hammond
- The Blazing Forest (1952) - Max
- The Clown (1953) - Joe Hoagley
- Seminole (1953) - Farmer (uncredited)
- Sangaree (1953) - Conspirator in Boat (uncredited)
- The Man from the Alamo (1953) - Billings (uncredited)
- Latin Lovers (1953) - Hotel Clerk (uncredited)
- War Paint (1953) - Trooper Allison
- Those Redheads from Seattle (1953) - Whitey Marks
- Forever Female (1953) - Leading Man (uncredited)
- Dangerous Mission (1954) - Ranger Dobson
- The High and the Mighty (1954) - Mr. Field (uncredited)
- The Yellow Tomahawk (1954) - Keats
- Return from the Sea (1954) - Captain
- The Eternal Sea (1955) - Operations Officer
- Hell's Island (1955) - Lawrence
- The Far Horizons (1955) - Cruzatte (helmsman)
- The Last Command (1955) - Irate Texan in Cantina (uncredited)
- Bobby Ware Is Missing (1955) - Max Goodwin
- Seven Men from Now (1956) - John Greer
- Emergency Hospital (1956) - Police Sgt. Paul Arnold
- Dance with Me, Henry (1956) - Drake
- Three Brave Men (1956) - George Pryor (uncredited)
- Rock, Pretty Baby! (1956) - Mr. Reid
- Last of the Badmen (1957) - Fleming (Dillon's aide) (uncredited)
- The Lawless Eighties (1957) - Capt. Ellis North
- The Helen Morgan Story (1957) - Loring Kirk (uncredited)
- Slim Carter (1957) - Richard L. Howard
- The Deep Six (1958) - Paul Clemson
- Summer Love (1958) - Mr. Reid
- How to Make a Monster (1958) - Detective Thompson
- Arson for Hire (1959) - Chief Hollister
- Wagon Train (1959) S3 E10 "The Danny Benedict Story" - Major Harrison
- Westbound (1959) - Julesburg Doctor (uncredited)
- The Horse Soldiers (1959) - Union Officer
- 13 Fighting Men (1960) - Col. Jeffers
- Sergeant Rutledge (1960) - Capt. McAfee (uncredited)
- Macumba Love (1960) - J. Peter Weils
- Posse from Hell (1961) - Olly (uncredited)
- Sea Hunt (1961, Season 4, Episode: "Imposter") - Case Jarrett
- Advise & Consent (1962) - Senate Staff Clerk (uncredited)
- How the West Was Won (1962) - River Pirate (uncredited)
- The Carpetbaggers (1964) - Monica's Lay-out Artist (uncredited)
- Cheyenne Autumn (1964) - Lt. Peterson (uncredited)
- Where Love Has Gone (1964) - George Babson
- Fort Courageous (1965) - Doc
- Mirage (1965) - Reporter (uncredited)
- Convict Stage (1965) - Sam Gill
- The Money Trap (1965) - Detective (uncredited)
- Moment to Moment (1966) - Hendricks
- The Oscar (1966) - Pereira (uncredited)
- The Sand Pebbles (1966) - Bidder at Red Kettle Bar (uncredited)
- The Destructors (1968) - Admiral
- Star! (1968) - Photographer (uncredited)
- Panic in the City (1968) - Frank Devers
- A Time for Dying (1969) - Mayor
- Tora! Tora! Tora! (1970) - Vice Adm. William S. Pye (uncredited)
