= The Sun Sets at Dawn =

1951 American film directed by Paul Sloane

- Theatrical release poster
- Directed by: Paul Sloane
- Screenplay by: Paul Sloane
- Produced by: Helen H. Rathvon; Paul Sloane
- Starring: Sally Parr; Patrick Waltz; Walter Reed
- Cinematography: Lionel Lindon
- Edited by: Sherman Todd
- Music by: Leith Stevens
- Production company: Holiday Films
- Distributed by: Eagle-Lion Films
- Release date: November 1, 1950 (United States)
- Running time: 71 minutes
- Country: United States
- Language: English

The Sun Sets at Dawn is a 1950 American film noir crime film directed by Paul Sloane and starring Sally Parr and Patrick Waltz.

== Plot ==
A young man sits in prison on the night before his execution, while his girlfriend waits for the inevitable in the prison governor's house. The warden and his wife sympathize with both of them. It is the first use of the electric chair in the state, and there are technical problems with its installation. Meanwhile, a group of reporters discussing the case, realize that the M.O. of the crime bears a similar style to that of a criminal, "Parrot" Farucco, who was supposed to have died three years previously. As the execution takes place off camera, a prison orderly collecting mail in the cafe identifies a customer as Farucco. He confronts him and is shot by the criminal, who is subdued and tied by other customers who happen to be prison officers waiting to begin work.

At the same time the reporters rush in, back from the prison to use the Post Office telephones. It turns out that the execution has had to be postponed owing to electrical problems with the chair. Farucco is brought into custody into the prison governor's office, and his fingerprints are taken to firmly establish his identity. The distraught girlfriend briefly rushes into the room, and he is visibly moved by her grief. When the fingerprints are a match, he admits he murdered the man the boy is about to be executed for killing.

Meanwhile, a second execution attempt is proceeding, but the power goes out in the prison before it can be completed. The warden, hearing what has happened, gets on the phone to the governor just as the boy and girl are reunited.

== Cast ==
- Sally Parr as The Girl
- Philip Shawn as The Boy
- Walter Reed as The Chaplain
- Lee Fredericks as Blackie / Farucco
- Houseley Stevenson as Pops
- Howard St. John as The Warden
- Louise Lorimer as The Warden's Wife
- Raymond Bramley as The Deputy Warden
- Charles Meredith as Reporter, AP
- King Donovan as Reporter, National News Service
- Charles Arnt as Reporter, Globe Express
- Sam Edwards as Reporter, Herald
- Percy Helton as Reporter, Feature Syndicate

== Reception ==
Film critic Dennis Schwartz wrote a mostly positive film review, "The story was well told, but the acting left a lot to be desired. And all that religious stuff thrown in, about how God listens to you, was strictly cornball. But as far as B-films go, this one is above average."

Film historian and critic Hal Erickson discussed the film's major theme. He wrote, "The Sun Sets at Dawn is a crime melodrama with strong religious overtones ... dozens of reporters gather around as The Boy tells his sad life story. While this is going on, the person who should be electrocuted is exposed, and it is suggested that a Divine force has brought about this last-minute miracle ... [and] the characters have no names; this, evidently, is meant to be symbolic."

== See also ==
- List of films in the public domain in the United States
