= Mexican Spitfire's Elephant =

1942 film by Leslie Goodwins

- Theatrical release poster
- Directed by: Leslie Goodwins
- Screenplay by: Charles E. Roberts
- Story by: Charles E. Roberts; Leslie Goodwins
- Produced by: Bert Gilroy
- Starring: Lupe Vélez; Leon Errol; Walter Reed; Elisabeth Risdon; Lydia Bilbrook; Marion Martin; Lyle Talbot; Luis Alberni
- Cinematography: Jack MacKenzie
- Edited by: Harry Marker
- Music by: C. Bakaleinikoff
- Production company: RKO Pictures
- Distributed by: RKO Radio Pictures
- Release date: September 11, 1942
- Running time: 64 minutes
- Country: United States
- Language: English

Mexican Spitfire's Elephant is a 1942 American comedy film directed by Leslie Goodwins and written by Charles E. Roberts. It is the seventh of eight in the franchise. The film stars Lupe Vélez, Leon Errol, Walter Reed, Elisabeth Risdon, Lydia Bilbrook, Marion Martin, Lyle Talbot, Luis Alberni, and Keye Luke. The film was released on September 11, 1942, by RKO Radio Pictures.

== Plot ==
A glamorous smuggler, Diana De Corro, has a valuable gem hidden inside an elephant-shaped onyx figurine. Anxious to get it past customs inspectors, she plants the figurine on the foggy Lord Epping, just arrived from England. Advertising representative Dennis Lindsay and his wife Carmelita are Epping's hosts in America. Diana and her partner-in-crime Red Madison keep trying to reclaim the contraband from Epping. Carmelita gets her confidant Uncle Matt to impersonate Epping, to find out if the nobleman is being victimized. When the real Lord Epping and the fake Lord Epping constantly cross the smugglers' paths and misunderstand what's going on, Red and Diana are at their wits' end.

== Cast ==
- Lupe Vélez as Carmelita Lindsay
- Leon Errol as Uncle Matt Lindsay / Lord Basil Epping
- Walter Reed as Dennis Lindsay
- Elisabeth Risdon as Aunt Della Lindsay
- Lydia Bilbrook as Lady Ada Epping
- Marion Martin as Diana De Corro
- Lyle Talbot as Red Madison
- Luis Alberni as Luigi
- Arnold Kent as Jose Alvarez
- Keye Luke as Lao Lee, magician
- Tom Kennedy as Joe the bartender
- George Cleveland as customs supervisor
- Marten Lamont as customs investigator
- Harry Harvey as ship steward
- Don Barclay as Smitty, elephant handler
- Max Wagner as Luigi's head waiter
- Eddie Borden as waiter
- Lloyd Ingraham as stage doorman

== Reception ==
After six Spitfire pictures, critics had noticed that the scripts were using the same situations again and again, and the reviews noted the laugh content but also noted the repetition. Mexican Spitfire's Elephant, however, received the best reviews in years. "By all odds, Mexican Spitfire's Elephant is the funniest picture of the series," wrote Vance King in Motion Picture Herald. "The Los Angeles preview audience was kept in a constant state of merriment by the film." Variety called it "solid laugh entertainment and best of the group." Film Daily reported, "Broad comedy runs rampant again in the latest of the Mexican Spitfire series. Those who like this sort of comedy should find Mexican Spitfire's Elephant good for an hour of solid laughs. Leslie Goodwins has given the film whirlwind direction." Exhibitors generally liked it, with one advising fellow showmen, "If you need a picture to provide laughs, don't overlook this one, for our people were really all in from laughing."
