= The Decision of Christopher Blake =

1948 film by Peter Godfrey

- Theatrical release poster
- Directed by: Peter Godfrey
- Screenplay by: Ranald MacDougall
- Produced by: Ranald MacDougall
- Starring: Alexis Smith; Robert Douglas; Cecil Kellaway; Ted Donaldson; John Hoyt; Harry Davenport
- Cinematography: Karl Freund
- Edited by: Frederick Richards
- Music by: Max Steiner
- Production company: Warner Bros. Pictures
- Distributed by: Warner Bros. Pictures
- Release date: December 23, 1948
- Running time: 75 minutes
- Country: United States
- Language: English

The Decision of Christopher Blake is a 1948 American drama film based upon the Moss Hart play. It was adapted by Ranald MacDougall and directed by Peter Godfrey. The film stars Alexis Smith, Robert Douglas, Cecil Kellaway, Ted Donaldson, John Hoyt, and Harry Davenport and was released by Warner Bros. Pictures on December 23, 1948.

== Plot ==
Evelyn and Ken Blake are about to break up their marriage and get a divorce. While she still loves him, she cannot forgive his infidelity. Their son, 12-year-old Christopher, is hurt and confused. The divorce suit goes to court and Ted must choose which of his parents he wants to stay with and is unable to decide.

== Cast ==
- Alexis Smith as Evelyn Blake
- Robert Douglas as Ken Blake
- Cecil Kellaway as Judge Alexander Adamson
- Ted Donaldson as Christopher Blake
- John Hoyt as Mr. Caldwell
- Harry Davenport as Courtroom Attendant
- Mary Wickes as Clara
- Art Baker as Mr. Kurlick

== Reception ==
Bosley Crowther of The New York Times said, "Whatever meaning and emotion were in Moss Hart's stage play, "Christopher Blake," which attempted to show the mental anguish of a boy whose parents were being divorced, have been lost, mislaid or stolen from the film based upon the play."
