= Unexpected Uncle =

1941 film by Peter Godfrey

- Directed by: Peter Godfrey
- Written by: Delmer Daves; Noel Langley
- Produced by: Tay Garnett
- Starring: Charles Coburn; Anne Shirley; James Craig
- Cinematography: Robert De Grasse
- Edited by: William Hamilton
- Music by: Anthony Collins
- Production company: RKO Radio Pictures
- Distributed by: RKO Radio Pictures
- Release date: November 7, 1941 (U.S.)
- Running time: 67 minutes
- Country: United States
- Language: English

Unexpected Uncle is a 1941 American comedy drama film directed by Peter Godfrey and starring Charles Coburn, Anne Shirley, and James Craig. It was produced and distributed by RKO Pictures.

== Cast ==
- Anne Shirley as Kathleen Brown
- James Craig as Johnny Kerrigan
- Charles Coburn as Alfred Crane
- Ernest Truex as Wilkins
- Renee Godfrey as Carol West
- Russell Gleason as Tommy Turner
- Astrid Allwyn as Sara Cochran
- Jed Prouty as Sanderson
- Jack Briggs as Waiter (uncredited)

== Reception ==
Upon its release, the film lost $195,000 at the box office.

== Bibliography ==
Tucker, David C. Gale Storm: A Biography and Career Record. McFarland, 2018.

== External list ==
- Unexpected Uncle at IMDb
