= The Mexican Spitfire's Baby =

1941 film by Leslie Goodwins

- Theatrical release poster
- Directed by: Leslie Goodwins
- Screenplay by: Charles E. Roberts; Jerome Cady
- Produced by: Cliff Reid
- Starring: Lupe Vélez; Leon Errol; Charles "Buddy" Rogers; ZaSu Pitts; Elisabeth Risdon; Fritz Feld
- Cinematography: Jack MacKenzie
- Edited by: Theron Warth
- Music by: Constantin Bakaleinikoff
- Production company: RKO Radio Pictures
- Distributed by: RKO Radio Pictures
- Release date: November 28, 1941
- Running time: 69 minutes
- Country: United States
- Language: English

The Mexican Spitfire's Baby is a 1941 American comedy film directed by Leslie Goodwins and written by Charles E. Roberts and Jerome Cady. It is the sequel to the 1940 film Mexican Spitfire Out West. The film stars Lupe Vélez, Leon Errol, Charles "Buddy" Rogers, ZaSu Pitts, Elisabeth Risdon and Fritz Feld. The film was released on November 28, 1941, by RKO Pictures.

== Plot ==
On their wedding anniversary, the Lindsays find themselves in the midst of an argument. To help them settle down, Uncle Matt reaches out to Lord Epping for assistance in getting a war orphan. However, Uncle Matt fails to specify which war, resulting in Lord Epping selecting a World War I orphan named Fifi, a glamour 20-something girl. The situation becomes problematic for Uncle Matt and Dennis, as their wives would be displeased if they found out.

In an attempt to conceal Fifi's presence, Uncle Matt takes her to the Bide-A-While Inn. However, Miss Pepper, an observant individual, becomes suspicious of this couple who share the same last name. Trouble ensues when Uncle Matt assumes the role of Lord Epping, and Fifi's boyfriend Pierre arrives in search of her.

== Cast ==
- Lupe Vélez as Carmelita Lindsay
- Leon Errol as Uncle Matt Lindsay / Lord Basil Epping
- Charles "Buddy" Rogers as Dennis Lindsay
- ZaSu Pitts as Miss Emily Pepper
- Elisabeth Risdon as Aunt Della
- Fritz Feld as Lt. Pierre Gaston de la Blanc
- Marion Martin as Fifi
- Lloyd Corrigan as Chumley
- Lydia Bilbrook as Lady Ada Epping
- Vinton Hayworth as Rudolph

== Reception ==
Variety said "Film strains to catch laughs, and only mildly achieves that aim. It reels along mainly on the efforts of Errol. Direction by Les Goodwins is spotty. Miss Velez is subordinate In Importance here to Errol, but does her usual explosive tirades at several intervals. Buddy Rogers goes well as her husband, and Fritz Feld, Elisabeth Risdon and ZaSu Pitts do well. In fact, cast is above its material."
