= Highways by Night =

1942 film directed by Peter Godfrey

- Directed by: Peter Godfrey; James Anderson (assistant)
- Screenplay by: Lynn Root; Frank Fenton
- Based on: Silver Spoon by Clarence Budington Kelland
- Produced by: Herman Schlom
- Starring: Richard Carlson; Jane Randolph
- Cinematography: Robert de Grasse
- Edited by: Harry Marker
- Music by: Constantin Bakaleinikoff; Roy Webb
- Production company: RKO Radio Pictures
- Release date: October 2, 1942 (US)
- Running time: 62 minutes
- Country: United States
- Language: English

Highways by Night is a 1942 American crime drama film directed by Peter Godfrey from a screenplay by Lynn Root and Frank Fenton, based on the story Silver Spoon, by Clarence Budington Kelland. The film stars Richard Carlson and Jane Randolph.

== Cast ==
- Richard Carlson as Tommy Van Steel
- Jane Randolph as Peggy Fogarty
- Jane Darwell as Grandma Fogarty
- Barton MacLane as Leo Bronson
- Ray Collins as Ben Van Steel
- Gordon Jones as 'Footsy' Fogarty
- Renee Godfrey as Ellen Cromwell
- Iris Adrian as Blonde Chorine
- Jack La Rue as Johnny Lieber - Gangster
- John McGuire as James 'Duke' Wellington
- George Cleveland as Judkins - Hotel Manager
- Marten Lamont as Reggie
- James Seay as Westbrook - Man with Trucks
- Cliff Clark as Police Captain James
- Paul Fix as Gabby
