= The Amazing Mr. X =

1948 film by Bernard Vorhaus

The Amazing Mr. X (The Spiritualist)
- Theatrical release poster
- Directed by: Bernard Vorhaus
- Written by: Crane Wilbur; Muriel Roy Bolton; Ian McLellan Hunter
- Produced by: Benjamin Stoloff
- Starring: Turhan Bey; Lynn Bari; Cathy O'Donnell
- Cinematography: John Alton
- Edited by: Norman Colbert
- Music by: Alexander Laszlo
- Color process: Black and white
- Production company: Ben Stoloff Productions
- Distributed by: Eagle-Lion Films
- Release date: July 29, 1948 (United States)
- Running time: 78 minutes
- Country: United States
- Language: English

The Amazing Mr. X, also known as The Spiritualist, is a 1948 American horror thriller film noir directed by Bernard Vorhaus with cinematography by John Alton. The film tells the story of a phony spiritualist racket. The film is prominently featured in Alton's book on cinematography Painting with Light (1949).

The film stars Turhan Bey, Lynn Bari, Cathy O'Donnell, and Richard Carlson. The film is in the public domain.

== Plot ==
Lobby card for the film

The night she is to meet her boyfriend Martin, Christine Faber hears the sound of her late husband Paul's voice calling out. She walks outside her beachfront home to investigate. There, she encounters a stranger named Alexis, a spiritualist who seems to know all about her. When Martin arrives at the beach, Christine turns to see him, and Alexis seems to disappear. Later, Martin proposes to her, and she accepts. When he leaves, Christine tries to go to sleep but is awoken by Paul's voice, accompanied by what she believes was his favorite musical composition, Frédéric Chopin's Fourth Prelude from Opus. 28 in E minor. Also, Martin's engagement ring and portrait have been replaced by Paul's, and her old wedding dress, which is supposed to be stored in another room, temporarily appears in front of her. Unnerved by all of this, Christine decides to consult Alexis.

At Alexis's mansion, Christine is amazed by what seems to be proof of his psychic abilities: elements within the house seem to move without anyone touching them, and Alexis knows details about her life she never told anyone. These supposed powers, however, are actually illusions, achieved by a mix of special effects hidden around the house and a thorough investigation performed by Alexis's secretary about Christine's life. Alexis and his secretary are also responsible for all the other supposedly supernatural events in Christine's life. Unaware of all of this, Christine starts seeing Alexis regularly to try to contact her dead husband.

Martin and her younger sister Janet suspect foul play, but cannot convince Christine that she is being conned. They decide to consult a detective specialized in unmasking frauds and learn that someone matching Alexis's description had already been once in jail. As the detective was involved in that operation and can be recognized by Alexis, he decides to send Janet undercover to get the psychic's fingerprints and confirm the latter's identity. However, Alexis quickly sees Janet's intentions and convinces her that, despite him having been in jail, his powers are real and his intentions are noble.

Janet is instantly smitten with Alexis. One evening, she accompanies Christine to Alexis's mansion, where he stages a convincing séance for the two women. After they leave, however, he is surprised by the appearance of Paul, alive and well. It turns out that Paul had faked his own death two years earlier. Having now returned, he schemes for ways to dispatch Christine in order to get his hands on her wealth. Using his knowledge of Alexis's crookedness, Paul begins blackmailing him into continuing his con of the two sisters.

One evening, while Alexis romances Janet outside the beach house, Christine hears Paul's voice again. Just as before, she exits her bedroom to search outside but falls partway down a cliff. Going against Paul's murderous plans, Alexis ultimately saves Christine. Later, Martin urges Christine to leave her house for safety and stay in a hospital. Christine refuses, entranced by Paul's recurring voice. However, Janet suspects something fishy in Paul's "visitations." When Paul's voice is heard again, she searches the beach house and discovers both Alexis and Paul concealed in a room with microphones, wire recordings, and other tricks of the spiritualist con game. Paul threatens Janet with a pistol, but Alexis tries to protect her from harm. While doing so, he is shot by Paul. The police arrive. Paul shoots at them; but the cops return fire. This time, Paul dies. Relieved to know that Janet is safe, Alexis dies soon after.

== Cast ==
- Turhan Bey as Alexis
- Lynn Bari as Christine Faber
- Cathy O'Donnell as Janet Burke
- Richard Carlson as Martin Abbott
- Donald Curtis as Paul Faber
- Virginia Gregg as Emily
- Harry Mendoza as Detective Hoffman

== Production ==
The film was known as The Spiritualist. It was an original story by Crane Wilbur and was bought by Producers Releasing Corporation in 1947, with Wilbur slated to direct.

Eventually the project was acquired by Eagle-Lion Films as a vehicle for Turhan Bey, who was under contract to the studio. Bernard Vorhaus was to direct and Muriel Bolton to adapt the story into a script. Vorhaus did the film under a two-picture deal he signed with Eagle-Lion. The other lead roles went to Lynn Bari and Cathy O'Donnell; the latter was borrowed from Sam Goldwyn.

Wilbur would go on to become one of Eagle-Lion's main writers. Vorhaus later said he was unhappy with the script, however, and asked for a rewrite. He says producer Ben Stoloff allowed him to hire Ian McLellan Hunter, who rewrote the script in a week.

Filming started 5 January 1948. Vorhaus says the shoot went for three weeks.

Turhan Bey later recalled the film as "a fantastic role with wonderful people to work with and a lovely death scene I completely loused up... I just wish all my roles had been as interesting as that one."

At one stage the film was also known as The Mystic.

== Reception ==
At previews, audiences found parts of the film to be funny, resulting in unintended laughter.

Executives at Eagle Lion were happy with the film. However, when Vorhaus declined I Married a Communist, the next movie they offered him, the company terminated its association with him.
