= Edward L. Ilou =

Swedish-born art director

- Born: August 20, 1905; Stockholm, Sweden
- Died: November 12, 1978 (aged 73); San Clemente, California, United States
- Education: Syracuse University
- Occupation: Art director
- Years active: 1947–1968 (film & TV)

Edward L. Ilou (1905–1978) was a Swedish-born art director who designed the sets of a number of Hollywood films and television episodes. Much of his early work was for Eagle-Lion Films. He was art director on a number film noirs including Raw Deal (1948) and He Walked by Night (1948). He is sometimes credited simply as Edward Ilou.

== Selected filmography ==
- Assigned to Danger (1948)
- Raw Deal (1948)
- Hollow Triumph (1948)
- The Noose Hangs High (1948)
- The Man from Texas (1948)
- Mickey (1948)
- Northwest Stampede (1948)
- The Iroquois Trail (1950)
- Under the Gun (1951)
- Kansas City Confidential (1952)
- China Venture (1953)
- El Alamein (1953)
- Carmen Jones (1954)
- The Black Dakotas (1954)
- Ten Wanted Men (1955)
- The Boy and the Pirates (1960)
- The Wicked Dreams of Paula Schultz (1968)

== Bibliography ==
- Alvarez, Max. The Crime Films of Anthony Mann. University Press of Mississippi, 2014.
- Dickos, Andrew. Street with No Name: A History of the Classic American Film Noir. University Press of Kentucky, 2002.
