= Judy Johnson (disambiguation) =

Judy Johnson (1899–1989) was an American baseball player.

Judy Johnson may also refer to:

- Judy Johnson (singer) (1924–2025), American pop singer
- Judy Johnson (writer) (born 1961), Australian poet and novelist
- Judy Johnson, mother who made allegations of Satanic abuse in the McMartin preschool trial
