= Lance Fuller =

Film and television actor (1928–2001)

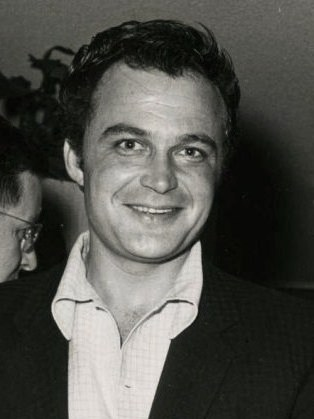
- Born: December 6, 1928; Somerset, Kentucky, U.S.
- Died: December 22, 2001 (aged 73); Los Angeles, California, U.S.
- Years active: 1943–1975
- Spouse: Joi Lansing (m. 1951; div. 1953)

Lance Fuller (December 6, 1928 – December 22, 2001) was an American actor.

== Biography ==
Born in Somerset, Kentucky, Fuller's first role was in Frankenstein Meets the Wolf Man (1943). Fuller was featured (uncredited) in several movies into the 1950s, including Singin' in the Rain (1952).

He co-starred in Cattle Queen of Montana with Ronald Reagan, in Apache Woman with Lloyd Bridges and was featured in Ed Wood's The Bride and the Beast.

He worked as a contract actor for most of the 1950s with Universal-International, and Universal's first color sci-fi film, This Island Earth. He also appeared in The Other Woman, The She-Creature, Pearl of the South Pacific and God's Little Acre.

Like many actors once under contract to the studios, Fuller's film career stalled in the late 1950s. He moved into television, where he appeared on the shows Bat Masterson, The Rifleman, 77 Sunset Strip, in two episodes of Maverick "Island In The Swamp", plus "The Cats of Paradise", in which he played a spoof of "Paladin" from Have Gun, Will Travel opposite James Garner and Buddy Ebsen), The Twilight Zone, Tombstone Territory and others. He quit the business in 1962, after resisting several offers from Warner Brothers to star in his own series.

In 1968, Fuller attacked a police officer in Los Angeles, and was shot in the chest, leaving him in critical condition.

Fuller recovered and in the early 1970s attempted a comeback and landed small roles in a few films and TV programs. His career ended much like it began, with many uncredited roles including The Andromeda Strain (1971) and Hustle (1975), which was his last acting role.

Fuller was married to actress Joi Lansing from 1951 to 1953. After a long illness he died in Los Angeles on December 22, 2001, aged 73.

== Partial filmography ==
- Frankenstein Meets the Wolf Man (1943) - Vasarian Villager (uncredited)
- To Have and Have Not (1944) - Minor Role (uncredited)
- Scarlet Street (1945) - Minor Role (uncredited)
- Night and Day (1946) - Student (uncredited)
- Song of Scheherazade (1947) - (uncredited)
- Singin' in the Rain (1952) - Chorus Boy (uncredited)
- All American (1953) - Student (uncredited)
- The Glass Web (1953) - Ad Lib Man (uncredited)
- War Arrow (1953) - Trooper (uncredited)
- Taza, Son of Cochise (1954) - Lt. Willis
- Playgirl (1954) - Newspaper Man (uncredited)
- Magnificent Obsession (1954) - Bar Patron (uncredited)
- The Black Shield of Falworth (1954) - Guard (uncredited)
- Cattle Queen of Montana (1954) - Colorados
- The Other Woman (1954) - Ronnie
- Kentucky Rifle (1955) - Jason Clay
- This Island Earth (1955) - Brack
- Pearl of the South Pacific (1955) - George
- Apache Woman (1955) - Armand LeBeau
- Slightly Scarlet (1956) - Gauss
- Secret of Treasure Mountain (1956) - Juan Alvarado
- Frontier Woman (1956) - Catawampus Jones
- Girls in Prison (1956) - Paul Anderson
- The She-Creature (1956) - Dr. Ted Erickson
- Tension at Table Rock (1956) - 'Polite' Cowhand (uncredited)
- Runaway Daughters (1956) - Tony Forrest
- Voodoo Woman (1957) - Rick Brady
- The Bride and the Beast (1958) - Dan Fuller
- God's Little Acre (1958) - Jim Leslie
- Day of the Outlaw (1959) - Pace
- Saint of Devil's Island (1961) - Francois
- Scream, Evelyn, Scream! (1970) - The Policeman
- The Andromeda Strain (1971) - Man (uncredited)
- The Love Machine (1971) - Producer (uncredited)
- The Longest Yard (1974) - Minor Role (uncredited)
- Hustle (1975) - Minor Role (uncredited) (final film role)
