= Hollow Triumph =

1948 American film by Steve Sekely

- Theatrical release lobby card
- Directed by: Steve Sekely
- Screenplay by: Daniel Fuchs
- Based on: Hollow Triumph; 1946 novel by Murray Forbes
- Produced by: Paul Henreid
- Starring: Paul Henreid; Joan Bennett; Leslie Brooks
- Cinematography: John Alton
- Edited by: Fred Allen
- Music by: Sol Kaplan
- Color process: Black and white
- Production company: Bryan Foy Productions
- Distributed by: Eagle-Lion Films
- Release date: August 18, 1948 (Reading, Pennsylvania)
- Running time: 83 minutes
- Country: United States
- Language: English

Hollow Triumph (working title The Man Who Murdered Himself, reissued in the United States as The Scar) is a 1948 American film noir crime film directed by Steve Sekely starring Paul Henreid, Joan Bennett and Leslie Brooks. It was released by Eagle-Lion Films, based on the 1946 novel of the same title written by Murray Forbes. The film's sets were designed by the art director Edward L. Ilou.

== Plot ==
Just released from prison, John Müller masterminds a holdup at an illegal casino run by Rocky Stansyck. The robbery goes bad, and the mobsters capture some of Müller's men and force them to identify the rest before killing them. Stansyck has a reputation for tracking down and killing his enemies, no matter how long it takes, so Müller decides to leave town and hide. He takes an office job recommended by his law-abiding brother, Frederick, but quickly decides that working for a living is not for him.

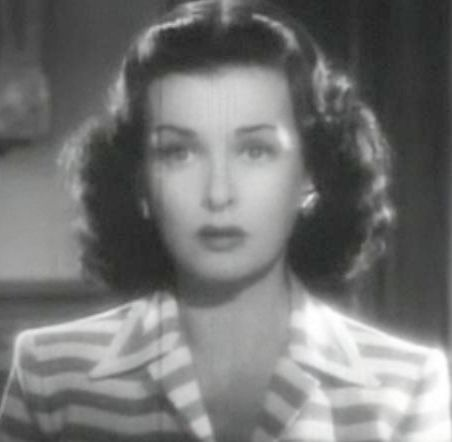
Joan Bennett as Bartok's secretary

A chance encounter with dentist Dr. Swangron reveals that Müller looks exactly like a psychoanalyst who works in the same building, Dr. Bartok, the only difference being a large scar on the left side of the doctor's face. Seizing the opportunity, he begins researching Bartok, even slipping into his office to examine his records. He is discovered by the doctor's secretary, Evelyn Hahn. She mistakes him for her employer and kisses him, but quickly realizes he is someone else. He persuades her to go out with him, though she has become embittered and claims to have given up any dreams of finding love.

Müller sets out to impersonate Bartok, aided by the fact he studied psychoanalysis in medical school before dropping out. He takes a photograph of the doctor and uses it as a guide to cut an identical scar on the right side of his own face. Only after he has already murdered Bartok and is preparing to dump the body in the river does he discover that Bartok actually has the scar on the left side of his face, and that when the photograph was printed the negative must have been inadvertently reversed, so Muller's scar is on the wrong side. He goes through with the plan anyway, and (except for the office cleaning lady, whose suspicions he manages to lull) no one notices the difference, not even Evelyn or Bartok's patients.

Müller then discovers "he" has a girlfriend, Virginia Taylor, and that they frequent Maxwell's, a high class casino. It also turns out Bartok has been losing heavily.

When a worried Frederick Müller tries to contact his brother, the trail leads to Bartok. The scar convinces Frederick that the man he sees is merely a lookalike. Evelyn, previously unaware of the switch (but now very suspicious), reveals that John Müller said he was going to Paris. Frederick Müller tells "Bartok" that his brother no longer has to hide, because Stansyck was convicted for "income tax problems" and is scheduled to be deported.

Afterwards, Evelyn realizes that Müller is an impostor and that he must have killed the psychoanalyst. Although he admits it to her, she does not turn him in to the police, instead purchasing a ticket to sail to Honolulu. Müller finds out and promises he will go with her, but she does not believe he would leave such an opportunity to enrich himself. Müller arranges for other doctors to take care of his patients and heads to the dock. There, however, he is intercepted by two men who want to discuss Bartok's $90,000 gambling debt. When Müller tries to break away, they fatally shoot him. Evelyn sails away, unaware that Müller intended to keep his promise to her.

== Cast ==
- Paul Henreid as John Müller / Dr. Victor Emil Bartok
- Joan Bennett as Evelyn Hahn
- Eduard Franz as Frederick Müller
- Leslie Brooks as Virginia Taylor
- John Qualen as Swangron
- Mabel Paige as Charwoman
- Herbert Rudley as Marcy
- Charles Arnt as Coblenz
- George Chandler as Artell, Assistant
- Sid Tomack as Aubrey, Manager
- Alvin Hammer as Jerry
- Ann Staunton as Blonde
- Paul E. Burns as Harold (as Paul Bruns)
- Charles Trowbridge as Deputy
- Morgan Farley as Howard Anderson
- Thomas Browne Henry as Rocky Stansyck
- Jack Webb as Bullseye (uncredited)
- Henry Brandon as Big Boy (uncredited)

== Production ==
Henreid wanted to move into production after being under contract with Warner Bros. He optioned a novel which had been suggested to him by director Steve Sekely and set up the project at the newly formed Eagle Lion. Henreid was keen to play the lead role, a gangster, as it was a different sort of part for him. He hired Daniel Fuch to write the script having admired the latter's work on Between Two Worlds. He wanted Evelyn Keyes for the lead but she was under contract to Columbia and Harry Cohn refused to loan her out, so Joan Bennett was cast instead.

Henreid says Eagle Lion were unhappy with Sekely's direction, so they replaced him with Henreid.

== Reception ==
Henreid says the film did well at the box office but the film was linked financially with three other movies from star producers. None of these did well so Henreid saw no profits.

=== Critical response ===
The New York Times critic Thomas M. Pryor called it "an adequate examination of an intelligent criminal type. There is not quite enough logic in the plot to enable it to stand up under scrutiny, but the story moves along briskly, the performances are sound and there is always the promise of more violence just around the corner."

Alain Silver in Film Noir: An Encyclopedic Reference to the American Style notes "As in many of these B thrillers, the plot is contrived although the film's conclusion is as downbeat as any noir film since Scarlet Street."

== See also ==
- List of films in the public domain in the United States
