= The Man from Texas (1948 film) =

1948 film by Leigh Jason

- Original film poster
- Directed by: Leigh Jason
- Written by: Joseph Fields; Jerome Chodorov
- Based on: Missouri Legend by E.B. Ginty
- Starring: James Craig; Lynn Bari
- Cinematography: John W. Boyle
- Music by: Earl Robinson
- Color process: Black and white
- Production company: Bryan Foy Productions
- Distributed by: Eagle-Lion films
- Release date: March 6, 1948
- Running time: 71 minutes
- Country: United States
- Language: English

The Man from Texas is a 1948 American Western film starring James Craig and Lynn Bari. The film was directed by Leigh Jason, with Earl Robinson serving as the film composer. It is credited as being based on the 1938 play and novel Missouri Legend by Elizabeth Beall Ginty that was based on Jesse James. It was produced by Bryan Foy for Eagle-Lion Films. The film's sets were designed by the art director Edward L. Ilou.

== Plot ==
Tobias Simms leads two lives, as a husband and father and as the outlaw called the El Paso Kid. He is of two minds whether to be an honest self supporting father or an outlaw. He compromises by using the skills of the latter to lead a life as the former.

== Cast ==
- James Craig as Tobias Simms - alias Toby Heath AKA The El Paso Kid
- Lynn Bari as Zee Simms - alias Zee Heath AKA Maw
- Johnnie Johnston as Billy Taylor
- Una Merkel as Widow Weeks
- Wallace Ford as Jed
- Harry Davenport as "Pop" Hickey
- Sara Allgood as Aunt Belle
- Reed Hadley as Marshal Gregg
- Brick Sullivan as Sheriff
