= El Alamein (1953 film) =

- Directed by: Fred F. Sears
- Written by: Horace McCoy; Herbert Purdom; George Worthing Yates
- Produced by: Wallace MacDonald
- Starring: Scott Brady; Edward Ashley; Rita Moreno
- Cinematography: Henry Freulich
- Edited by: Richard Fantl
- Music by: Mischa Bakaleinikoff
- Production company: Columbia Pictures
- Distributed by: Columbia Pictures
- Release date: December 3, 1953
- Running time: 66 minutes
- Country: United States
- Language: English

El Alamein is a 1953 American war film directed by Fred F. Sears and starring Scott Brady, Edward Ashley and Rita Moreno. Also known by the alternative title of Desert Patrol, it depicts the 1942 Battle of El Alamein during the North African Campaign.

== Plot ==
During the events of World War II, Banning (Scott Brady), an American civilian makes a living selling tanks to the Allied troops. In the process of delivering them to British soldiers on the front line, he becomes stuck with a group of men at a desert location that the Afrika Korps is using as a place to dump fuel. They delay the German onslaught until assistance arrives, before eventually blowing up the Nazi fuel supply and returning to the safety of the British lines.

== Cast ==
- Scott Brady as Joe Banning
- Edward Ashley as Capt. Harbison
- Robin Hughes as Sgt. Alf Law
- Rita Moreno as Jara
- Michael Pate as Sgt. McQueen
- Peter Brocco as Selim
- Peter Mamakos as Cpl. Singh Das
- Ray Page as Nazi Pilot
- Benny Rubin as Egyptian Driver
- Henry Rowland as Nazi Officer

== Production ==
El Alamein was produced and distributed by Columbia Pictures, with sets designed by the art director Edward L. Ilou.

Scenes were filmed at the sand dunes in El Segundo, California. Actual combat footage was used to enhance the staged dramatics.

== Bibliography ==
- David Eldridge. Hollywood's History Films. B.Tauris, 2006.
