= Pearl of the South Pacific =

1955 film by Allan Dwan

- Theatrical release poster
- Directed by: Allan Dwan
- Screenplay by: Jesse L. Lasky, Jr. Talbot Jennings
- Story by: Anna Hunger
- Produced by: Benedict Bogeaus
- Starring: Virginia Mayo; Dennis Morgan; David Farrar; Murvyn Vye; Lance Fuller
- Cinematography: John Alton
- Edited by: James Leicester; Carlo Lodato
- Music by: Louis Forbes
- Production company: Benedict Bogeaus Production
- Distributed by: RKO Radio Pictures
- Release date: July 4, 1955
- Running time: 86 minutes
- Country: United States
- Language: English

Pearl of the South Pacific is a 1955 American adventure film directed by Allan Dwan and written by Jesse L. Lasky, Jr. and Talbot Jennings. The film stars Virginia Mayo, Dennis Morgan, David Farrar, Murvyn Vye, and Lance Fuller. The film was released on July 4, 1955, by RKO Radio Pictures. It was based on a story by Anna Hunger.

== Plot ==
Dan Merrill awakens on his boat after a night of drinking to find his former love, Rita Delaine, there with his partner, Bully Hague. Appealing to his greed, Rita and Bully coax him into coming along to an island where supposedly they can dive for a hidden treasure of rare black pearls.

On the island, high priest Michael, a white man, has a son, George, who is about to marry Momu, the daughter of Halemano, the native chief. The arrival of the boat carrying Dan, Rita, and Bully interrupts the wedding ceremony. Before the interlopers can be repelled, Rita poses as a missionary and George, who has never seen the outside world, persuades his father to welcome her to their isle.

After Rita's missionary clothes are stolen and burned by Momu, Rita ingratiates herself with the natives and infatuates George. He shows her a lagoon where the pearls can be found but refuses to dive, calling it taboo. Rita laughs and dives in, only to encounter a giant, deadly octopus.

Dan and Bully become more aggressive in seeking the pearls. Dan goes to the lagoon with George and together they slay the octopus. George does another dive for the pearls after making a deal with Bully for him to leave the island and never return, but Bully stabs him in the back and takes the pearls once George surfaces. The natives come after the newcomers and kill Bully with a spear. Halemano also orders Rita put to death but Dan rescues her during the process. Dan returns the pearls and decides, along with Rita, to remain on the island after their ship is destroyed by fire and explosion by the inhabitants.

== Cast ==
- Virginia Mayo as Rita Delaine
- Dennis Morgan as Dan Merrill
- David Farrar as Bully Hague
- Murvyn Vye as Halemano
- Lance Fuller as George
- Basil Ruysdael as Tuan Michael
- Lisa Montell as Momu
