= Dolores Moran =

American actress (1926–1982)

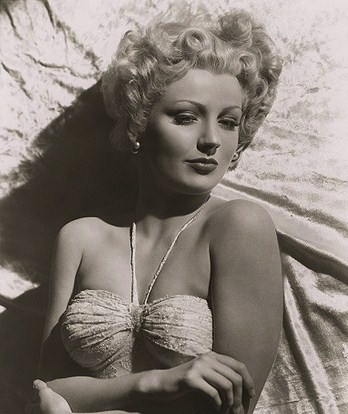
- Moran in Johnny One-Eye (1950)
- Born: Dolores Jean Moran; January 27, 1926; Stockton, California, U.S.
- Died: February 5, 1982 (aged 56); Woodland Hills, California, U.S.
- Occupation: Actress
- Years active: 1942–1954
- Spouse: Benedict Bogeaus (m. 1946; div. 1962)
- Children: 1 son

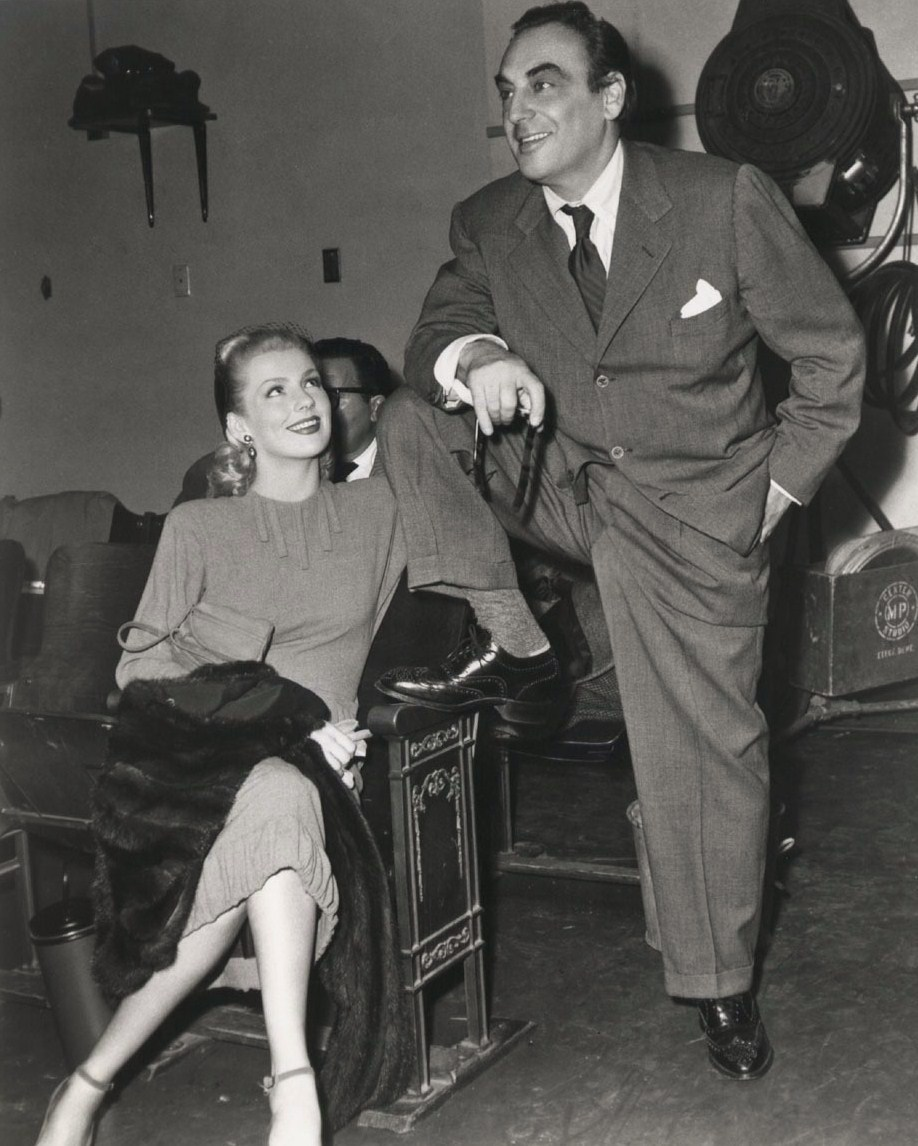
Dolores Moran with husband Benedict Bogeaus, ca. 1950s

Dolores Jean Moran (born Jacqueline G. Moran, January 27, 1926 – February 5, 1982) was an American film actress and model.

== Early years ==
Moran was born in Stockton, California, the daughter of James G. Moran and Esther Moran (née Whitton), and attended elementary and secondary schools there. She won the Northern California Oratorical Contest and starred in school plays.

== Film career ==
In 1942, aged 16, Moran, was signed by Warner Bros. to a seven-year contract, with her parents' permission. Her acting debut came in Old Acquaintance (1943).

Moran's brief career as a film actress began with uncredited roles in such films as Yankee Doodle Dandy (1942) as "the Pippirino" (with whom George blows off a date to go out with Mary). By 1943, she had become a pin-up girl appearing on the cover of such magazines as Yank. She was given supporting roles in films, such as Old Acquaintance (1943) with Bette Davis.

Warner Bros. attempted to increase interest in her, promoting her along with Lauren Bacall as a new screen personality when Bacall was cast alongside Humphrey Bogart in To Have and Have Not (1944). The film made a star of Bacall, but Moran languished, and subsequent films did little to further her career.

The Horn Blows at Midnight (1945) gave her a leading role with Jack Benny and Alexis Smith, but her film appearances after this were sporadic, and she suffered ill health that reduced her ability to work. Her film career ended in 1954 with a featured role in the John Payne and Lizabeth Scott western film Silver Lode.

== Personal life ==
Moran married film producer Benedict Bogeaus in Salome, Arizona in August 1946. They had a son, Brett. The couple divorced in 1962.

In 1968, Moran was the recipient of a bequest valued at $300,000 (equivalent to $2,800,000 in 2025). Anthony Ponce, an apricot grower, bequeathed the bulk of his estate to her because he appreciated her kindness over 25 years earlier when she worked as a carhop at a drive-in. Ponce's will directed that $6,000 go to his nephew and five nieces, with the rest to go to Moran. The nieces and nephew contested the will, but courts ruled it valid.

== Death ==
In 1982, Moran died of cancer, aged 56.

== Filmography ==
Year	Title	Role	Studio	Director	Notes
1942	Winning Your Wings	Blonde at Dance	War Activities Committee of the Motion Pictures Industry	John Huston	Uncredited
1942	Yankee Doodle Dandy	The Pippirino	Warner Bros.	Michael Curtiz	Uncredited
1943	The Hard Way	Young Blonde	Warner Bros.	Vincent Sherman	Uncredited
1943	Three Cheers for the Girls	Blonde Chorus Girl	Warner Bros.	Busby Berkeley, Jean Negulesco	(segment "Framing Story"), Uncredited
1943	Old Acquaintance	Deirdre Drake	Warner Bros.	Vincent Sherman	
1944	The Last Ride	Molly Stevens	Warner Bros.	D. Ross Lederman	Uncredited
1944	To Have and Have Not	Mme. Hellene de Bursac	Warner Bros.	Howard Hawks	
1944	Hollywood Canteen	Herself	Warner Bros.	Delmer Daves	
1945	The Horn Blows at Midnight	Violinist / Fran Blackstone	Warner Bros.	Raoul Walsh	
1945	Too Young to Know	Patsy O'Brien	Warner Bros.	Frederick De Cordova	
1946	Without Reservations	Herself	RKO	Mervyn LeRoy	
1947	The Man I Love	Gloria O'Connor	Warner Bros. \	Raoul Walsh	
1947	Christmas Eve	Jean Bradford	United Artists	Edwin L. Marin	
1950	Johnny One-Eye	Lily White	United Artists	Robert Florey	
1953	Count the Hours	Paula Mitchener	RKO	Don Siegel	
1954	Silver Lode	Dolly	RKO	Allan Dwan	(final film role)
