= Todd McCarthy =

American film critic and author

- Born: February 16, 1950 (age 76); Evanston, Illinois, U.S.
- Education: Stanford University (BA)
- Occupations: Writer, film critic
- Spouse: Sasha Alpert (m. 1993)

Todd McCarthy (born February 16, 1950) is an American film critic and author. He wrote for Variety for 31 years as its chief film critic until 2010. In October of that year, he joined The Hollywood Reporter, where he subsequently served as chief film critic until 2020. McCarthy subsequently began writing regularly for Deadline Hollywood in 2020.

== Early life ==
Todd McCarthy was born in Evanston, Illinois, the son of Daniel and Barbara McCarthy. His mother was a cellist and served as the president of the Evanston Symphony Orchestra. His father was a rancher and real-estate developer. McCarthy graduated from Evanston Township High School (ETHS) in 1968 and Stanford University in 1972. While at ETHS, he made a silent, plotless movie on Super 8 film titled Mimi after the nickname of his featured classmate who later became known as Claudia Jennings. In college, McCarthy was hired as a critic at the newspaper office on campus. His first review was a positive one for the French-Italian film Belle de Jour (1967). He wrote it at the age of 18.

== Career ==
McCarthy edited Kings of Bs: Working Within the Hollywood System with Charles Flynn, a book that discusses the great filmmakers of B movies, which was published in 1975. He moved to Los Angeles and from 1974 to 1975, worked for Paramount Pictures as an assistant to Elaine May. He helped her edit Mikey and Nicky (1976). From 1975 to 1977, McCarthy worked for New World Pictures in Los Angeles as the director of advertising and publicity. He also joined The Hollywood Reporter as a film critic in 1975 but was let go a year later. McCarthy was later the manager of the English-language edition of Le Film français in 1977. The next year, he got a job as a Hollywood editor for Film Comment.

McCarthy joined Daily Variety in 1979 and worked as a reporter and film critic until 1989. In 1990, McCarthy wrote the PBS documentary Preston Sturges: The Rise and Fall of an American Dreamer which won him an Emmy Award. He directed four documentaries about film: Visions of Light (1992), Claudia Jennings (1995), Forever Hollywood (1999), and Man of Cinema: Pierre Rissient (2007). Visions of Light was named the Best Documentary of the Year by the National Society of Film Critics and the New York Film Critics Circle. Forever Hollywood has been played at Grauman's Egyptian Theatre for more than a decade.

In 1991 he joined Variety as film review editor of Variety and Daily Variety. He wrote about the producer/director Howard Hawks in his book, Howard Hawks: The Grey Fox of Hollywood, which was published in 2000. In 2007 he wrote Fast Women: The Legendary Ladies of Racing. McCarthy also wrote Des Ovnis, des Monstres et du Sexe: Le Cinéma Selon Roger Corman (2011).

McCarthy lost his job at Variety in March 2010, having been the longest-serving member of their staff. McCarthy began writing for IndieWire after leaving Variety. He was rehired by The Hollywood Reporter in October 2010 as the chief film critic under Janice Min. He wrote the introduction to the 2013 edition of cinematographer John Alton's book Painting with Light. McCarthy lost his job at The Hollywood Reporter in April 2020. McCarthy subsequently began writing regularly for Deadline Hollywood later in 2020.

== Personal life ==
At age 43, McCarthy married documentary filmmaker Sasha Alpert on July 4, 1993, at his family's ranch in Pagosa Springs, Colorado.

== Bibliography ==
- Kings of the Bs: Working within the Hollywood system : an anthology of film history and criticism (1975) (edited by Todd Mccarthy and Charles Flynn)
- Howard Hawks: The Grey Fox of Hollywood (2000)
- Fast Women: The Legendary Ladies of Racing (2007)
- Telling Stories: Norman Rockwell from the Collections of George Lucas and Steven Spielberg (2011) (coauthor Virginia Mecklenburg)
