= Johnny One-Eye =

1950 film by Robert Florey

- Directed by: Robert Florey
- Screenplay by: Richard H. Landau (as Richard Landau)
- Based on: Damon Runyon (based on a story by)
- Produced by: Benedict Bogeaus
- Starring: Pat O'Brien; Wayne Morris; Dolores Moran; Gayle Reed
- Cinematography: Lucien N. Andriot
- Edited by: Frank Sullivan
- Color process: Black and white
- Production company: Benedict Bogeaus Productions
- Distributed by: United Artists
- Release dates: May 5, 1950; November 16, 1950 (New York)
- Running time: 78 minutes
- Country: United States
- Language: English

Johnny One-Eye is a 1950 American film noir crime film directed by Robert Florey and starring Pat O'Brien, Wayne Morris, Dolores Moran and Gayle Reed.

== Plot ==
In Manhattan, former gangster turned legitimate businessman Martin Martin has become the target of a politically ambitious district attorney who has offered immunity for Martin's former crime partner Dane Cory in exchange for his testimony. After being informed about the deal and narrowly escaping arrest, Martin visits Cory to dissuade him from testifying. The meeting becomes a shootout in which Martin is shot but kills one of Cory's henchmen before fleeing. With his picture on newspaper front pages and a reward on his head, Martin hides in an abandoned house. While recovering to prepare a final assault on Cory, he adopts an injured dog that strays into his hideout and names him Johnny One-Eye.

== Cast ==
- Pat O'Brien as Martin Martin
- Wayne Morris as Dane Cory
- Dolores Moran as Lily White
- Gayle Reed as Elsie White
- Donald Woods as Vet
- Barton Hepburn as Cory Henchman
- Raymond Largay as Lawbooks
- Lawrence Cregar as Ambrose
- Forrest Taylor as Man on Street who quotes Lord Byron
- Lester Allen as Designer-Choreographer
- Jimmy Little as Captain of Police
- Jack Overman as Lippy
- Lyle Talbot as Official from District Attorney's Office
- Harry Bronson as Cute Freddy

== Reception ==
In a contemporary review for The New York Times, critic Thomas M. Pryor wrote:

[T]here is no evidence in the screen-play version by Richard Landau of the spirit that distinguished Mr. Runyon's flavorsome chronicles of picturesque underworld characters. Nor is there any vitality in the direction or the performances of a competent cast headed by Pat O'Brien. ... Robert Florey, who directed, never succeeds in bringing any effective degree of tension to the manhunt and has handled with marked clumsiness a number of sequences involving a curly-headed little girl—a blurred carbon copy of Little Miss Marker herself—who is abused by one of the racketeers and befriended by the other. After about five minutes of little Gayle Reed's self-conscious cuteness even a tolerant parent is likely to run screaming from the theatre.

== See also ==
- List of American films of 1950
