= How Little We Know =

1944 song by Hoagy Carmichael and Johnny Mercer

"How Little We Know" is a song written by Hoagy Carmichael and Johnny Mercer for the 1944 film To Have and Have Not, where it is performed by the character "Slim" played by Lauren Bacall. A young Andy Williams recorded the song for the film as a possible alternative track to dub Bacall's low voice; however, Bacall claimed that they used her singing. After the film's release, it was a hit recording sung by Judy Johnson. Nick Perito and his orchestra recorded an instrumental cover of the song for Muzak's Stimulus Progression program in the 1970s.

In 1948, a recording of "How Little We Know" by British singer Steve Conway was released by Columbia. It has been covered periodically, most recently in 1999 by Michael Feinstein with the Maynard Ferguson Big Band for the album Big City Rhythms.

This song should not be confused with the Carolyn Leigh/Phillip Springer composition "(How Little It Matters) How Little We Know", which was first recorded by Frank Sinatra in 1956.
