= Slightly Scarlet (1956 film) =

1956 film by Allan Dwan

- Theatrical release poster
- Directed by: Allan Dwan
- Screenplay by: Robert Blees
- Based on: Love's Lovely Counterfeit by James M. Cain
- Produced by: Benedict Bogeaus
- Starring: John Payne; Rhonda Fleming; Arlene Dahl
- Cinematography: John Alton
- Edited by: James Leicester
- Music by: Louis Forbes
- Color process: Technicolor
- Production company: Benedict Bogeaus Productions
- Distributed by: RKO Radio Pictures
- Release date: February 8, 1956
- Running time: 99 minutes
- Country: United States
- Language: English

Slightly Scarlet is a 1956 American crime film starring John Payne, Rhonda Fleming and Arlene Dahl. The film was directed by Allan Dwan, and its cinematographer was John Alton. The script was based on James M. Cain's novel Love's Lovely Counterfeit.

== Plot ==
The ruthless and uncouth Solly Caspar, the crime boss of Bay City (a fictional town near San Francisco), wishes to defeat a campaign by multimillionaire mayoral reform candidate Frank Jansen. Caspar tasks crooked ex-cop Ben Grace with uncovering dirt on Jansen. Ben follows Jansen's secretary and girlfriend June Lyons to a women's prison to photograph her collecting her sex-starved kleptomaniac sister Dorothy, a multiple ex-con.

Ben is attracted to June and withholds the incriminating evidence from Caspar. He instead gives June an audiotape recording that proves that Caspar killed a crusading newspaper owner who had supported Jansen. Caspar is forced to flee to Mexico. Ben seduces June, steals her from Jansen and, without June's or Caspar's knowledge, takes command of Caspar’s rackets. However, Ben faces resistance from Caspar’s gang, city hall and the police.

Dorothy, who had been attracted to Ben from the start, continues her play for him. She accompanies him to Caspar's former beach house, where there is a safe containing $160,000. Despite Dorothy's advances, Ben remains uninterested. She accidentally fires a spear gun at his head, narrowly missing. After searching the house, Ben is forced to leave without finding the money. To exact revenge for Ben’s rejection, Dorothy tells June that the beach-house trip was a romantic escapade. June confronts Ben, who responds by assuring her that he only wants her.

Dorothy is arrested for stealing a pearl necklace, and June pleads with Ben to intervene on Dorothy's behalf. He persuades his former boss, a former lieutenant who owes him a favor, to release Dorothy and purge her record. Jansen, who still loves June, insists that Dorothy must return to jail.

Caspar returns from Mexico seeking revenge on Ben. At the beach house, Caspar finds a drunken and provocative Dorothy alone, and she attempts to seduce him. When Caspar boastfully scatters the money from the vault on the floor and offers some to Dorothy, she tries to steal even more. Caspar invites her to return to Mexico with him. June arrives, seeking to rescue Dorothy, but Caspar points his gun at her and throws her down on the terrace, where she lands on the spear gun and shoots him with it before firing his own revolver at him twice.

Ben arrives and pleads with June to flee with him and the money, but she refuses. Caspar, still alive after being shot by June, shoots Ben and wounds him. When Caspar’s gang arrives, Ben, June and Dorothy are trapped in a bedroom, but Ben phones the police and calls for a full squad to be dispatched to the house. Caspar's gang tells Ben that if he will leave the bedroom, the women will be spared. Ben emerges and taunts Caspar, who shoots him several times.

The police arrive and arrest Caspar and his gang. Badly wounded, Ben is placed on a stretcher. June speaks to him tenderly before he is placed in an ambulance. Dorothy emerges from the bedroom, seemingly penitent.

== Cast ==
- John Payne as Ben Grace
- Rhonda Fleming as June Lyons
- Arlene Dahl as Dorothy Lyons
- Kent Taylor as Frank Jansen
- Ted de Corsia as Solly Caspar
- Lance Fuller as Gauss
- Buddy Baer as Lenhardt
- Ellen Corby as June Lyons' Maid (uncredited)
- Frank Gerstle as Detective Lt. Dave Dietz (uncredited)
- Myron Healey as Wilson - Caspar Thug (uncredited)

== Production ==
Rhonda Fleming and Arlene Dahl, both redheads who had previously competed often for film roles, reportedly feuded on the set. The animosity began when Fleming refused to wear lingerie manufactured and sold by Dahl's company. The women insisted upon separate makeup and wardrobe assistants and flipped a coin to determine who would receive top billing for the film. One account suggested that a scene in which Fleming's character slaps Dahl's character in the face required five takes because Fleming seemed to have enjoyed causing pain to Dahl.

Fleming and John Payne had recently appeared together in Tennessee's Partner (1955), another film produced by Benedict Bogeaus.

== Reception ==
In a contemporary review for The New York Times, critic Bosley Crowther wrote: "Two red-headed women and one fat-headed man are the principal characters ... In the end all their faces are red. So, we say, should be the faces of the people responsible for this film, which is said to have been taken from a novel (unrecognizable) of James M. Cain. For it is an exhausting lot of twaddle about crime and city politics, an honest mayor, his secretary-mistress, her kleptomaniacal sister and the fellow who wants to get control of the gang.

Critic and filmmaker Jean-Luc Godard included Slightly Scarlet in his list of the best films of the year in Cahiers du Cinéma.

== See also ==
- List of American films of 1956
