= Raw Deal (1948 film) =

1948 film by Anthony Mann

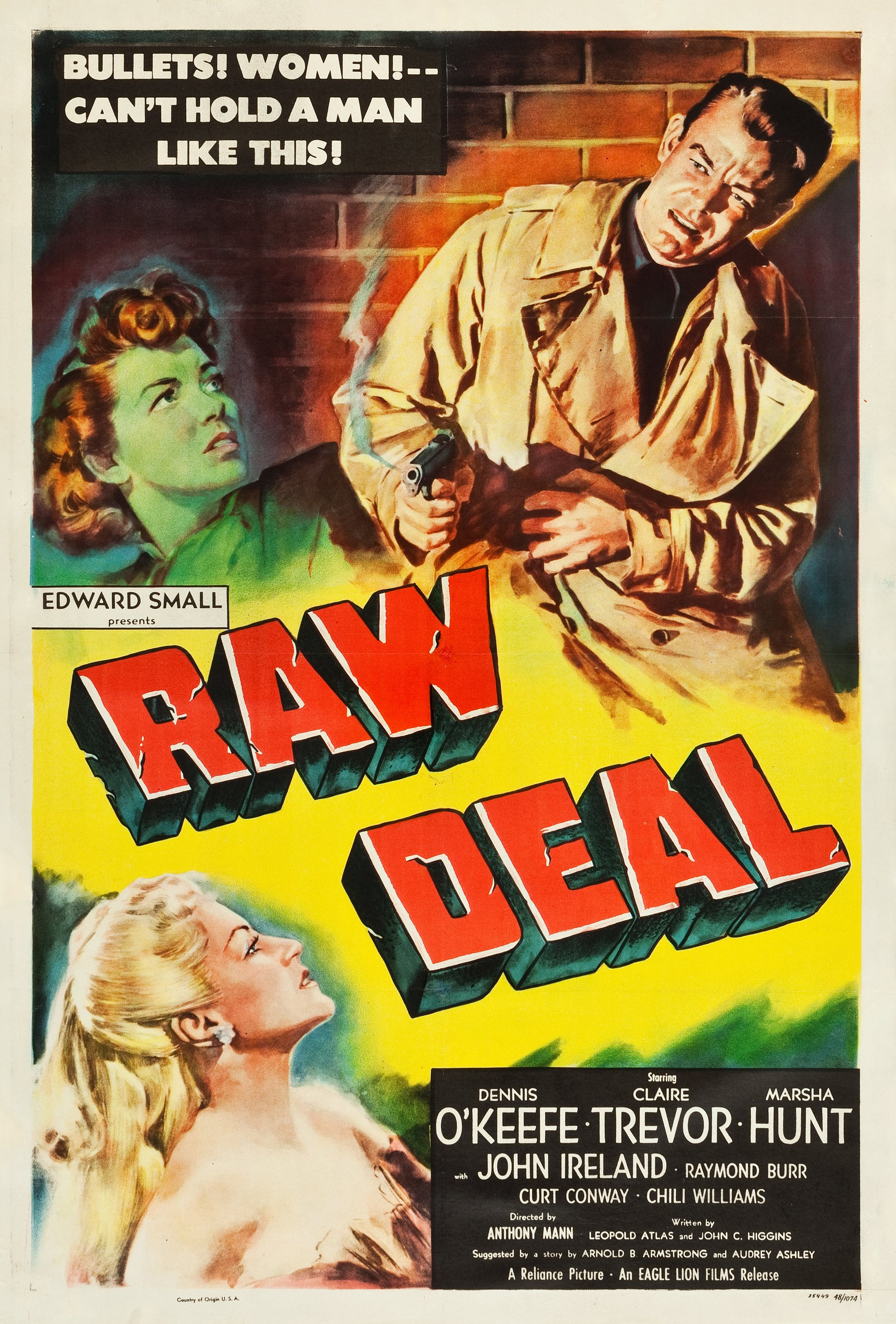
- Theatrical release poster
- Directed by: Anthony Mann
- Screenplay by: Leopold Atlas; John C. Higgins
- Story by: Arnold B. Armstrong; Audrey Ashley
- Produced by: Edward Small
- Starring: Dennis O'Keefe; Claire Trevor; Marsha Hunt
- Cinematography: John Alton
- Edited by: Alfred DeGaetano
- Music by: Paul Sawtell
- Color process: Black and white
- Production company: Edward Small Productions
- Distributed by: Eagle-Lion Films
- Release date: May 26, 1948 (United States)
- Running time: 79 minutes
- Country: United States
- Language: English

Raw Deal is a 1948 American film noir crime film directed by Anthony Mann and starring Dennis O'Keefe, Claire Trevor and Marsha Hunt. It was shot by cinematographer John Alton with sets designed by the art director Edward L. Ilou. An independent production by Edward Small, it was distributed by Eagle-Lion Films.

== Plot ==
Prison convict Joe Sullivan has "taken the fall" for an unspecified crime. His share for committing the crime was to be $50,000. Joe breaks out of jail with the help of his girl Pat. The escape has been facilitated by their former accomplice Rick Coyle, a sadistic mobster, who expects that Joe will be killed during his escape and so Rick will avoid having to pay Joe his $50,000. When, against all expectations, the breakout succeeds, Rick decides that he must have Joe killed.

Pat and Joe's getaway car is damaged, and Joe decides that they will hide out in the apartment of his legal caseworker Ann. Ann had been visiting Joe in prison because she was trying to reform him and also because she was developing feelings for him. When the police close in on Ann's apartment she tries to convince Joe to give himself up. Instead Joe forces Ann to escape with him and Pat. Pat sees the attraction between Joe and Ann, and doesn't know what to do about it. Joe finds himself between two women who love him. The three of them continue to evade the police until Fantail, one of Rick's men, finds them. Fantail and Joe get into a fight, and Ann saves Joe by shooting Fantail in the back. After acting in Joe's defense this way, Ann realizes how much she is in love with him. Out of loyalty to Pat, Joe sets Ann free and prepares to flee the country with Pat. In Joe and Pat's hotel room, Pat takes a phone call warning them that Rick has seized Ann and will harm her unless Joe and Pat come out of hiding. Pat does not want Joe to go back to Ann, so she lies about the call, saying that it was from the hotel desk clerk asking about their checkout time.

After they board a ship, Joe attempts to convince Pat that they can start a new life in South America together. He even proposes marriage to her. A guilt-stricken Pat now confesses to Joe that Ann has been abducted by Rick. Joe races to save Ann from her captor. Under the cover of a thick fog, Joe manages to get past Rick's henchmen and sneaks into Rick's room. A gunfight erupts, Rick and Joe shoot each other, and they inadvertently start a fire. Joe and Rick, both wounded, fight hand-to-hand, and then Joe pushes Rick through an upper-storey window to his death. Lying in the street, Joe dies in Ann's arms as Pat looks on. Seeing the resigned contentment in Joe's face, Pat comments in voice-over: "This is right for Joe. This is what he wanted."

== Cast ==
- Dennis O'Keefe as Joe Sullivan
- Claire Trevor as Pat Regan
- Marsha Hunt as Ann Martin
- John Ireland as Fantail
- Raymond Burr as Rick Coyle
- Curt Conway as Spider
- Chili Williams as Marcy
- Richard Fraser as Fields
- Whit Bissell as Murderer
- Cliff Clark as Gates
- Richard Irving as Brock
- Harry Tyler as Oscar
- Ilka Grüning as Fran – Oscar's Housekeeper
- Tom Fadden as Grimshaw
- Ray Teal as Police Commanding Officer
- Robert B. Williams as San Francisco Detective Sergeant
- Carey Loftin as Motorcycle Cop
- Gregg Barton as Car Owner
- Regis Toomey as Police Detective (uncredited)
- Bill Kennedy as Drunk
- Beverly Wills as Girl

== Reception ==
=== Box-office ===
The film was a success at the box office and was profitable.

=== Critical reception ===
When the film was released, New York Times critic Bosley Crowther panned it. "But this, of course, is a movie—and a pretty low-grade one, at that—in which sensations of fright and excitement are more diligently pursued than common sense...Except for the usual moral—to wit, that crime does not pay—the only thing proved by this picture is that you shouldn't switch sweethearts in mid-lam."

In Girl and a Gun: The Complete Guide to Film Noir, David N. Meyer wrote: "It's the richest cinematography in noir outside of Orson Welles' Citizen Kane."

Eddie Muller listed it as one of his Top 25 Noir Films.

=== In popular culture ===
The title characters in Harlan Ellison's 1969 post-apocalyptic novella A Boy and His Dog watch Raw Deal, which is said to be 76 years old (setting the Ellison story in the year 2024).
