= Benedict Bogeaus =

American film producer

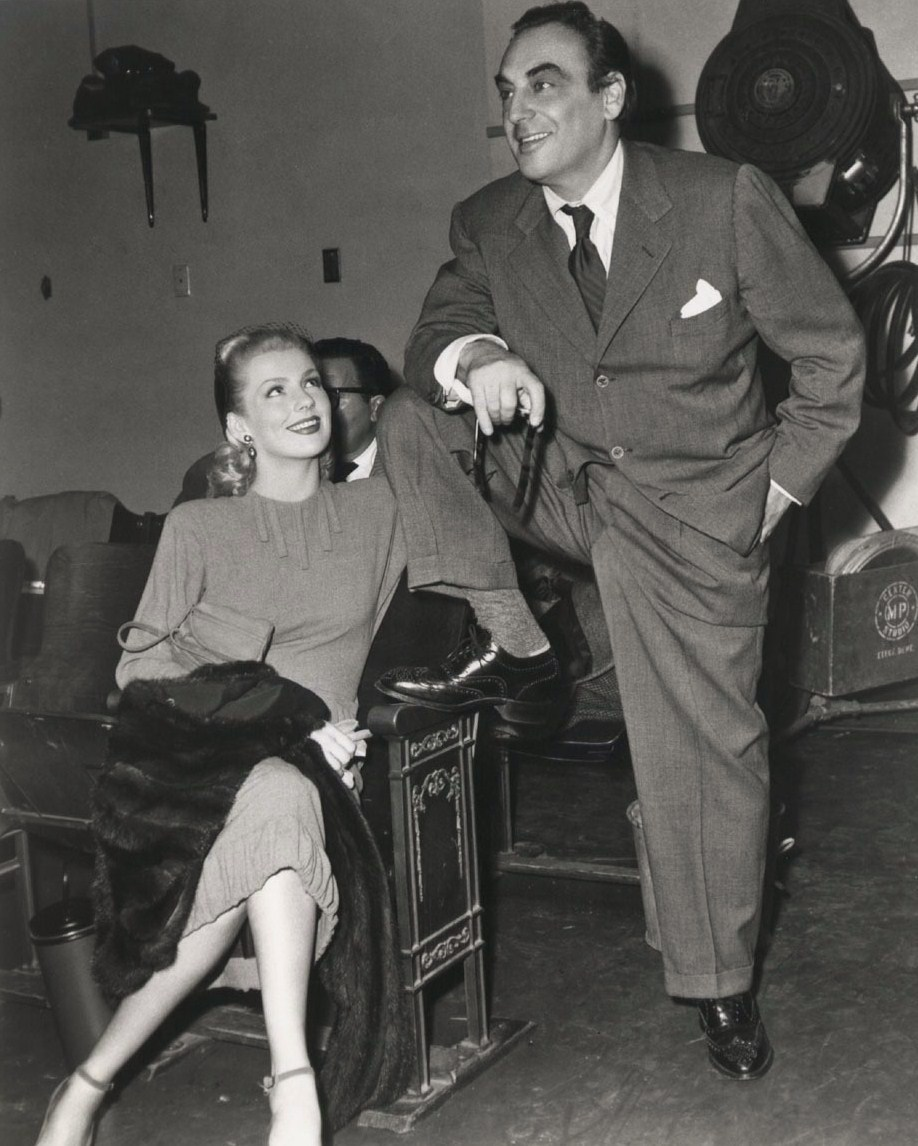
Dolores Moran with husband Benedict Bogeaus, ca. 1950s

Benedict Bogeaus (May 4, 1904, in Chicago – August 23, 1968, in Hollywood), was an independent film producer and former owner of General Service Studios.

== Biography and filmography ==
Bogeaus' business career started when he was seventeen, working as an accountant in a junk yard. He bought into the yard, and used it to get a loan of $2,000 to build an apartment block. "Borrowing money then was as easy as buying a sandwich", he said.

He became a property developer in Chicago, accumulating a fortune of $18 million, which he lost during the Great Depression. He went to Europe with what money had had left, looking for new opportunities. He produced a film in France, The Virgin Man (1932) with Fernandel and another in Germany, Daughter of the Regiment (1933) and later said both were "very bad".

He settled down in Chicago again and in 1935 established the radio manufacturing company, the General Extolite Corporation. In 1939 he bought into the Zitpit Company in Belgium, but had to flee on the advent of World War II. Bogeaus moved to Hollywood in 1940 and went into partnership with Herbert Huston making a portable developing machine. The advent of World War II saw this become a huge success.

When AT&T's Western Electric unit that manufactured sound equipment for film was forced by an antitrust action to divest itself of the General Service Studio complex, Bogeaus outbid producer Edward Small to acquire the studio. He allowed the United States Government to use his complex for film work and leased it out to various independent film producers, keeping his eye on their progress. Eventually he decided to make films himself. Later, in 1946, William Cagney's production company brought a substantial interest in the studios.

=== Early Films ===
Forming Benedict Bogeaus Productions in 1944, his first film was The Bridge of San Luis Rey (1944), directed by Rowland V. Lee and released through United Artists. It was not a financial success but his second film, Dark Waters (1944), directed by Andre de Toth, was.

He followed it with Captain Kidd (1945), directed by Lee with Charles Laughton and Randolph Scott. He also produced The Diary of a Chambermaid (1946) along with stars Paulette Goddard and Burgess Meredith; it was directed by Jean Renoir.

Though these films were critically acclaimed, they didn't set the box office on fire. Realising the public's attraction to low and middle budget films with star power, Bogeaus signed George Raft on for a few films, beginning with Mr. Ace (1946), directed by Edwin Marin. The movie was not a financial success.

Bogeaus made The Macomber Affair (1947) with Gregory Peck directed by Zoltan Korda. He made two anthology films with multiple stars in different storylines so they could be filmed at different times: Christmas Eve (1947), with Raft and Scott, directed by Marin; On Our Merry Way (1948), with Goddard, James Stewart and Henry Fonda. and Bogeaus featured Dorothy Lamour and George Montgomery in two films, Lulu Belle (1948) and The Girl from Manhattan (1948). He ventured into film noir with The Crooked Way (1949) and Johnny One-Eye (1950), both directed by Robert Florey:.

Bogeaus produced My Outlaw Brother (1951), a Western with Mickey Rooney, and One Big Affair (1952), a comedy with Evelyn Keyes.

=== RKO ===
Most of Bogeaus' films had been released through United Artists. He signed a deal with RKO for Count the Hours (1952) and Appointment in Honduras (1953).

Bogeous produced some action films with Allan Dwan, all for RKO: Silver Lode (1954), Passion (1954), Cattle Queen of Montana (1955), Escape to Burma (1955), Pearl of the South Pacific (1955), Tennessee's Partner (1955), and Slightly Scarlet (1955).

RKO collapsed and Bogeaus made The River's Edge (1957) with Dwan for Fox, and Enchanted Island (1958) for Warners.

=== Final Films ===
Bogeaus' final films included two directed by Byron Haskin in Mexico: From the Earth to the Moon (1958) and Jet Over the Atlantic (1959). The latter was the first production from Inter-Continent Films and Inter-Continent Releasing, two companies formed by Bogeaus and James R. Grainger. They announced a series of films, including Jet Over the Atlantic, The Gold Bug, Shoot Out!, Early Autumn and The Glass Wall. However, only Jet was made.

His last production was Most Dangerous Man Alive directed by Dwan that was filmed in 1958 in Mexico but not released until 1961. Dwan and Bogeaus cooperated in three unfilmed projects, a remake of The Bridge at San Luis Rey, Will You Marry Me, written by Dwan, and The Glass Wall.

== Personal life ==
Bogeaus was married from 1928 to 1931 to Broadway star Ethelind Terry, from 1939 to 1944 to actress Mimi Forsythe and from 1946 to 1962 to actress Dolores Moran.

He died of a heart attack, aged 64.

Bogeaus was parodied in name only in the Three Stooges comic books of the 1950's; a recurring villain/adversary of the Stooges was named "Benedict Bogus."

== Quotes ==
"All independent producers go broke sooner or later. It's because they try and make artistic pictures. I make good commercial ones. It pays off".
