= Judy Johnson (singer) =

American singer (1924–2025)

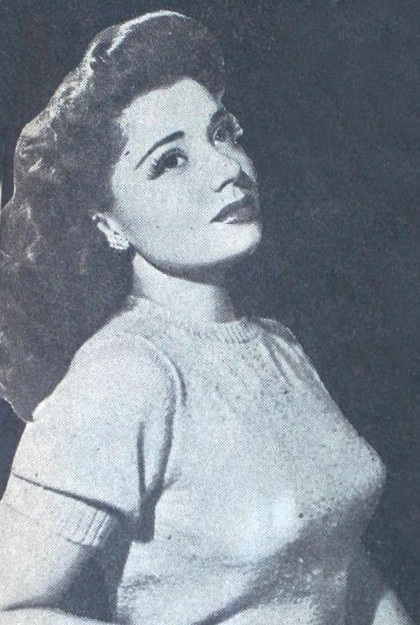
- Judy Johnson c. 1945
- Born: Betty Bonney; March 8, 1924; Bridgeport, Connecticut, U.S.
- Died: January 29, 2025 (aged 100); Calabasas, California, U.S.
- Occupation: Singer
- Spouse: Mort Lindsey (m. 1954; died 2012)

Judy Johnson (born Betty Bonney; March 8, 1924 – January 29, 2025) was an American pop singer most notable for her regular appearances on the NBC television series Your Show of Shows in the 1950s. Early in her career, she was billed under her birth name.

== Early years ==
Judy Johnson was born Betty Bonney on March 8, 1924 in Bridgeport, Connecticut. In the late 1930s, Johnson and her family moved to Nutley, New Jersey, and while there she learned tap dancing. After two years, they moved back to Norfolk. There she began singing on a radio station and began singing with a band at age 11. She performed at age 14 as a dancer and singer in a tent show headed by Gene Austin. When she was 18, she moved to New York to study musical comedy. In addition to studying, she traveled on USO tours and appeared in night clubs, including the Copacabana in New York.

== Career ==
In the early 1940s, she sang with the Les Brown Orchestra. In 1941, she had a hit of "Joltin' Joe DiMaggio" with Brown's group. She later sang with Frankie Carle and his orchestra. Her biggest hit was "How Little We Know", written by Hoagy Carmichael and Johnny Mercer for the character played by Lauren Bacall in the film To Have and Have Not.

In 1943, Johnson sang with Jan Savitt and his orchestra and Jerry Wald and his orchestra.

Johnson's television appearances included singing on the syndicated game show Hidden Treasure, the NBC game show Judge for Yourself, and the NBC variety show Tonight! America After Dark. On old-time radio, she was a regular on The Robert Q. Lewis Show.

Most of the kinescopes of Your Show of Shows were discarded by NBC, so few video appearances of Johnson remain. In one remaining film clip Johnson sings a cover of the Four Lads song "No, Not Much!". Her last television singing appearance was on The Arthur Murray Party in 1959.

In 1950, Johnson joined Sammy Kaye as a singer with his orchestra. In 1952, she signed a contract with MGM Records to join Bill Hayes, with whom she sang on Your Show of Shows, to record duets. In 1955, she performed on Broadway as Miss Adelaide in Guys and Dolls.

== Personal life and death ==
Johnson married composer and conductor Mort Lindsey in 1954. She died at a retirement home in Calabasas, California, on January 29, 2025, at the age of 100.
