= Under the Gun (1951 film) =

- Theatrical release poster
- Directed by: Ted Tetzlaff
- Screenplay by: George Zuckerman
- Story by: Daniel B. Ullman
- Produced by: Ralph Dietrich
- Starring: Richard Conte; Audrey Totter; John McIntire
- Cinematography: Henry Freulich; John L. Herman
- Edited by: Virgil W. Vogel
- Music by: Milton Rosen
- Production company: Universal Pictures
- Distributed by: Universal Pictures
- Release date: 1951
- Running time: 83 minutes
- Country: United States
- Language: English

Under the Gun is a 1951 American crime film noir film directed by Ted Tetzlaff and starring Richard Conte, Audrey Totter and John McIntire. It was produced and released by Universal Pictures. The film's sets were designed by the art director Edward L. Ilou.

== Plot ==
At a Miami nightclub, gangster Bert Galvin offers to take singer Ruth Williams under his wing and to New York, helping her career. She agrees once it is made clear that their relationship will be strictly business.

On the road, they stop for dinner at Claude's Restaurant, where Bert knows the owner. The local sheriff, Bill Langley, recognizes Bert and tips off a revenge-minded man whose brother Bert killed. But given a warning by Claude what's about to happen, Bert shoots and kills the man.

Charged with murder, Bert is defended by Milo Bragg, a smooth-talking Southern lawyer. Claude testifies that the killing was in self-defense. Ruth is expected to do the same, but when district attorney Arthur Sherbourne reminds her that she's under oath, Ruth breaks down and tells the truth.

Bert is convicted and sentenced to 20 years in a prison farm. There, prisoners are all literally "under the gun" of a ruthless trustee, Nugent, who is a convict like themselves but carries a rifle. Bert intends to escape, but fellow inmate Sam Gower befriends him and explains that a trustee is promised an immediate pardon if he should kill any prisoner who tries to flee.

As a test, Bert lies to a gullible con called Five Shot that there's $25,000 waiting for him if he can break out. Five Shot is killed by Nugent, who does indeed immediately receive his parole. Bert seizes the opportunity to take his place as trustee.

Bragg, the lawyer, pays a visit, now a drunk, disbarred and desperate for money. Bert has him dig up information about Gower, his fellow inmate. He learns that Gower's family was left in dire financial straits. Bert makes a proposition, saying he will pay the family $25,000 if Gower will try to escape. Guilt-ridden about his family, Gower agrees. He nearly makes it out safely before Bert kills him.

Now paroled, Bert immediately tracks down Ruth, seeking vengeance for her testimony. Sheriff Langley is following, though, as they take a speedboat, then end up on foot in a swamp. Ruth gets her hands on Bert's gun, but cannot bring herself to shoot him. Langley has no such hesitation, taking aim and shooting Bert dead.

== Cast ==
- Richard Conte as Bert Galvin
- Audrey Totter as Ruth Williams
- John McIntire as Sheriff Bill Langley
- Sam Jaffe as Samuel Gower
- Shepperd Strudwick as Milo Bragg
- Gregg Martell as Nero
- Phillip Pine as Gandy
- Donald Randolph as Arthur Sherbourne
- Royal Dano as Sam Nugent
- Richard Taber as Five Shot
- William (Bill) Schell Jr. as Deputy/Boat Driver and Owner of the "Fastest" Boat in Mandarin on the St. John's River.

== Reception ==
Film critic Bosley Crowther had morality problems with the script, writing, "We might also note that the acting of Richard Conte in the principal role and of Sam Jaffe, Royal Dano, Richard Taber and John McIntire is good. But we can't for the life of us figure any reason for such an aimless tale, except to indulge in bleak sadism. The marksmanship is infinitely better than the film."

Time Out magazine liked the acting in the film, "No forgotten masterpiece, but a neat little crime thriller, ingeniously plotted by George Zuckerman ... Worth watching for the admirable Conte, the Florida locations, and fitful direction by Tetzlaff, a fine cameraman (My Man Godfrey, Notorious) who never quite hit his director's stride again after the excellent The Window in 1949."
