= Silver Lode (film) =

1954 film by Allan Dwan

- Theatrical release poster
- Directed by: Allan Dwan
- Screenplay by: Karen DeWolf
- Story by: Karen DeWolf
- Produced by: Benedict Bogeaus
- Starring: John Payne; Lizabeth Scott; Dan Duryea
- Cinematography: John Alton
- Edited by: James Leicester
- Music by: Louis Forbes; Howard Jackson
- Production company: Benedict Bogeaus Productions
- Distributed by: RKO Radio Pictures
- Release dates: June 24, 1954 (Los Angeles, California); July 23, 1954 (United States)
- Running time: 81 minutes
- Country: United States
- Language: English

Silver Lode is a 1954 American Technicolor Western film directed by Allan Dwan and starring John Payne, Lizabeth Scott and Dan Duryea.

== Plot ==
The film, with a similar plot to High Noon, tells the story of Dan Ballard (John Payne) and Rose Evans (Lizabeth Scott), who are about to be married on the Fourth of July when Marshal Fred McCarty (Dan Duryea) and his deputies ride into town looking for Ballard. McCarty accuses Ballard of having murdered his brother and has come to arrest him.

At first, the townspeople are on Ballard's side, but gradually they turn against him, especially when they believe that he has killed the town sheriff (Emile Meyer). Ballard tries to prove his innocence and expose McCarty.

== Cast ==
- John Payne as Dan Ballard
- Lizabeth Scott as Rose Evans
- Dan Duryea as Fred McCarty
- Dolores Moran as Dolly
- Emile Meyer as Sheriff Wooley
- Robert Warwick as Judge Cranston
- John Hudson as Michael 'Mitch' Evans
- Harry Carey Jr. as Johnson
- Alan Hale Jr. as Kirk
- Stuart Whitman as Wickers
- Frank Sully as Paul Herbert, Telegrapher
- Morris Ankrum as Zachary Evans
- Hugh Sanders as Reverend Field
- Florence Auer as Mrs. Elmwood
- Roy Gordon as Dr. Elmwood

== Review ==
In its review, the New York Times wrote, "The script by Karen De Wolfe was a complete misfire." In his review of the American cinema, director Martin Scorsese praises the movie for its daring exposure on McCarthyism, with the movie's villain even named McCarty.
