= Count the Hours =

1953 film by Don Siegel

Count the Hours!
- Theatrical release poster
- Directed by: Don Siegel
- Screenplay by: Doane R. Hoag; Karen DeWolf
- Story by: Doane R. Hoag
- Produced by: Benedict Bogeaus
- Starring: Macdonald Carey; Teresa Wright; John Craven; Jack Elam
- Cinematography: John Alton
- Edited by: James Leiceste
- Music by: Louis Forbes
- Production company: Benedict Bogeaus Production
- Distributed by: RKO Pictures
- Release date: April 1, 1953 (U.S.)
- Running time: 76 minutes
- Country: United States
- Language: English

Count the Hours! is a 1953 film noir directed by Don Siegel, featuring Macdonald Carey, Teresa Wright, John Craven, and Jack Elam.

== Plot ==
In the middle of the night, a mysterious stranger breaks in and steals from Fred Morgan, an elderly farmer. Fred and his housekeeper Sarah Watson are awakened by the intrusion and are shot dead. The next morning, Fred's nephew Alvin Taylor discovers the bodies and immediately alerts George Braden, Fred's farm assistant. District Attorney Jim Gillespie questions George, who lived nearby when the murder occurred. The police examine .32 caliber bullets were used, and George's pregnant wife Ellen disposes of their gun in a lake. A small box of .32 caliber bullets are found, and George and Ellen are taken in for questioning.

At the jail house, George and Ellen are interrogated for sixteen hours but deny criminal involvement. George, wanting to spare his wife any more grief, confesses to the murders. Gillespie asks lawyer Doug Madison to take the case, though he initially declines as he doesn't believe in George's innocence. Meanwhile, Ellen attempts to retrieve the gun from the lake and is threatened by a handwritten letter to leave town or else. In his office, Doug's fiancée Paula suggests he drops the case as defending George would harm his political future. However, moved by Ellen's determination, Doug reverses his decision and hires a professional diver to locate the gun. After three weeks, Doug falls behind in paying the diver, and the diver attempts to rape Ellen.

George's trial proceeds, but during the closing arguments, the trial is adjourned when his handgun is located. However, the ballistics report proves inconclusive and the jury finds George guilty of the murder. Doug, believing in his client's innocence, files to appeal the case. Later on, Alvin, who has inherited his uncle's farm, attempts to evict Ellen. Doug pleads to have Ellen stay, and learns in conversation that Max Verne, a farm hand who had worked for Fred Morgan, had threatened Morgan after he was fired.

Doug drives to Verne's farm and meets his girlfriend Gracie Sager. Doug investigates Verne's criminal records and learns that he had served time for burglary. Later that night, Verne is arrested and confesses to the murder. During the re-trial, Gillespie summons Verne's doctor, who discredits the confession. With no further evidence to prove Verne's guilt, the case is dismissed and George's conviction is upheld.

After the trial, Doug misses a dinner party with Paula as Ellen gives birth to a boy. Frustrated by Doug's inattention, Paula breaks her engagement with him. Doug makes one more desperate appeal, but the state governor upholds the conviction and George is sentenced to hang. At a local bar, Doug and Ellen learn from a bartender that Verne had known of the murders before the police did. Doug instructs the bartender to telephone the sheriff, but before he places the call, Verne arrives. The bartender alerts Verne that Doug will question Gracie. Verne leaves and the bartender contacts the sheriff.

Doug arrives at Verne's farm and questions Gracie of his whereabouts while Verne arrives to kill Doug. Just as Verne is about to shoot, he is arrested and found in possession of Fred Morgan's wallet. George's execution is reprieved as Paula apologizes to Doug, and the two amend their relationship.

== Cast ==
- Macdonald Carey as Doug Madison
- Teresa Wright as Ellen Braden
- John Craven as George Braden
- Jack Elam as Max Verne
- Edgar Barrier as D.A. Jim Gillespie
- Dolores Moran as Paula Mitchener
- Adele Mara as Gracie Sager, Max Verne's girlfriend
- Ralph Sanford as Alvin Taylor
- Dolores Fuller as Reporter (uncredited)

== Reception ==
Howard Thompson of The New York Times wrote: "Even with fairly thoughtful direction by Don Siegel, in addition to some nice raw photography throughout, this offering sacrifices substance of plain conviction for standardized suspense." However, John Alton's cinematography was praised for showcasing "the solitariness of the figures against lake backgrounds, night skies, and highlighted interiors for dramatic effect."

Has been shown on the Turner Classic Movies show 'Noir Alley' with Eddie Muller.

== See also ==
- List of films featuring home invasions

== Sources ==
- Kass, Judith M. (1975). Don Seigel: The Hollywood Professionals, Volume 4 (1975 ed.). New York: Tanvity Press. p. 207. ISBN 0-498-01665-X.
