= Christmas Eve (1947 film) =

1947 film by Edwin L. Marin

- Original Film poster
- Directed by: Edwin L. Marin
- Screenplay by: Laurence Stallings
- Story by: Laurence Stallings; Richard H. Landau
- Produced by: Benedict Bogeaus
- Starring: George Raft; George Brent; Randolph Scott
- Cinematography: Gordon Avil
- Edited by: James Smith
- Music by: Heinz Roemheld
- Production company: Benedict Bogeaus Productions
- Distributed by: United Artists
- Release date: October 31, 1947
- Running time: 90 minutes
- Country: United States
- Language: English
- Box office: $1 million

Christmas Eve is a 1947 American portmanteau comedy drama film directed by Edwin L. Marin and starring George Raft, George Brent and Randolph Scott. It is based on a story by Laurence Stallings and Richard H. Landau. An independent production by Benedict Bogeaus it was distributed by United Artists. It was re-released under the alternative title Sinner's Holiday. It was one of several films Raft made with Edwin Marin and Benedict Bogeaus.

== Plot ==
Phillip Hastings is the greedy nephew of eccentric Matilda Reed and seeks to have her judged incompetent so he can administer her wealth. In an informal meeting with Philip and Dr. Doremus, Judge Alston rules that she will be saved if her three long-lost adopted sons, whom she can trust, appear for a Christmas Eve reunion.

Separate stories reveal with the help of Private Detective Gimlet that:

- Michael is a bankrupt playboy loved by loyal Ann Nelson;
- Mario is a seemingly shady character tangling with a Nazi war criminal--and a beautiful lady, Claire--in South America; and
- Jonathan is a hard-drinking rodeo rider who falls for a flirtatious woman, Jean Bradford, at the station. She's revealed to be a policewoman in disguise, chasing after an orphanage that doesn't seem to do right.

Finally, the gathering at Christmas Eve happens, featuring the three sons and Jean. Jonathan and Jean end up bringing three baby girls from the orphanage that is a front for human trafficking. Mario confronts Phillip about taking the rap for a bad deal in New Orleans ten years ago, for which he makes sure to have each leave town before Matilda gets hurt. Aunt Matilda feels like the day she got the three little boys for adoption.

== Cast ==
- Ann Harding as Aunt Matilda Reed
- Reginald Denny as Phillip Hastings
- Clarence Kolb as Judge Alston
- Carl Harbord as Dr. Doremus
- Joe Sawyer as Private Detective Gimlet
- George Raft as Mario Torio
- George Brent as Michael Brooks
- Randolph Scott as Jonathan "Johnny"
- Joan Blondell as Ann Nelson
- Virginia Field as Claire
- Dolores Moran as Jean Bradford
- Douglass Dumbrille as Dr. Bunyan
- Claire Whitney as Mrs. Bunyan
- Marie Blake as Reporter
- Dennis Hoey as Williams-Butler
- Molly Lamont as Harriet Rhodes
- John Litel as Joe Bland, FBI Agent
- Walter Sande as Mario's Hood
- Konstantin Shayne as Gustav Reichman
- Andrew Tombes as Auctioneer

== Production ==
The film was produced by Benedict Bogeaus who had previously made an episodic film On Our Merry Way. This involved using multiple stars in different storylines so they could be filmed at different times. In November 1946 Bogeaus announced that Raft, Scott and Brent would star. Each star would film for two weeks individually and then act together for one week. Filming started on 18 November with the Brent-Joan Blondell sequence.

Dolores Moran, who appeared in the cast, was Bogeaus' wife at the time. The film marked Ann Harding's first appearance since It Happened on Fifth Avenue.

The film was financed through money from Walter E. Heller & Co, a finance company.

During filming, George Raft suffered first-degree burns in his right leg when a maritime engine caught fire and set his clothes alight.

== Reception ==
=== Critical ===
The Los Angeles Times said the premise of the film had "considerable appeal" but the "plot lacked cohesion" and the story was done in by its "slow pace".

=== Box office ===
The film did not do very well at the box office. According to Variety it earned an estimated $1 million.

Walter Heller and Co initiated foreclosure proceedings to recover money for the film, claiming they were owed $223,000 (they also did this for Bachelor's Daughters). This was rare in Hollywood at the time.

== 1986 remake ==
The film was remade as a made-for-TV movie that first aired on NBC, December 22, 1986. It was directed by Stuart Cooper and starred Loretta Young, Trevor Howard, Arthur Hill, Ron Leibman, Patrick Cassidy, and Season Hubley. Young was awarded a Golden Globe for her performance.

== See also ==
- List of Christmas films
