= Painting with Light =

1949 book on cinematography by John Alton

- Author: John Alton
- Language: English
- Publisher: Macmillan Publishers
- Publication date: 1949

Painting with Light (ISBN 0-520-08949-9) is a book about cinematography by John Alton. It was the first book written on the topic by a major cinematographer.

Painting with Light was first published in 1949. The book's primary focus is on light and the many complex ways a camera crew can manipulate it for effect. Although much of the technical information is now obsolete, Alton, who worked on the films noir classics T-Men, He Walked by Night, The Amazing Mr. X, and The Big Combo, explains how lighting, shooting locations, and various camera techniques can be used to create a visual mood in film.

It was reviewed in The Times Literary Supplement no. 4845, (1996): 18
