= To Have and Have Not (film) =

1944 American romance-war-adventure film by Howard Hawks

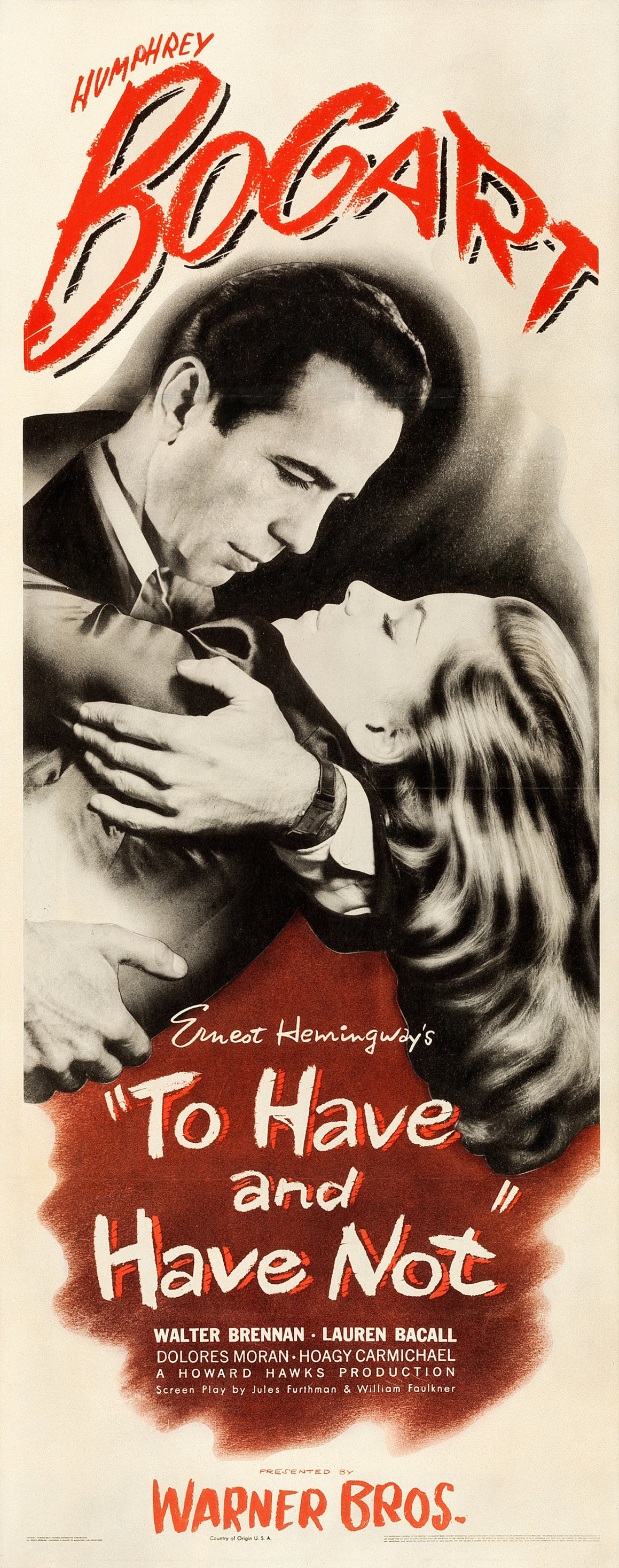
- Theatrical release poster
- Directed by: Howard Hawks
- Screenplay by: Jules Furthman; William Faulkner
- Based on: To Have and Have Not; 1937 novel by Ernest Hemingway
- Produced by: Howard Hawks; Jack L. Warner
- Starring: Humphrey Bogart; Walter Brennan; Lauren Bacall; Dolores Moran; Hoagy Carmichael
- Cinematography: Sidney Hickox
- Edited by: Christian Nyby
- Music by: Franz Waxman; William Lava (one cue, uncredited)
- Distributed by: Warner Bros. Pictures
- Release dates: October 11, 1944 (New York City, premiere)
- Running time: 100 minutes
- Country: United States
- Language: English
- Budget: $1.68 million
- Box office: $5.3 million

To Have and Have Not is a 1944 American romantic war adventure film directed by Howard Hawks, loosely based on Ernest Hemingway's 1937 novel of the same name. It stars Humphrey Bogart, Walter Brennan and Lauren Bacall; it also features Dolores Moran, Hoagy Carmichael, Sheldon Leonard, Dan Seymour, and Marcel Dalio. The plot, centered on the romance between a freelancing fisherman in Martinique and a beautiful American drifter, is complicated by the growing French resistance in Vichy France.

Hemingway and Hawks were close friends and, on a fishing trip, Hawks told Hemingway, who was reluctant to go into screenwriting, that he could make a great movie from his worst book, which Hemingway admitted was To Have and Have Not. Jules Furthman wrote the first screenplay, which, like the novel, was set in Cuba. However, later versions changed this to Martinique to avoid violating President Roosevelt's Good Neighbor policy. Hawks's friend William Faulkner was the main contributor to the screenplay, including and following the revisions. Because of the contributions from both Hemingway and Faulkner, it is the only film story on which two winners of the Nobel Prize for Literature worked. Filming began on February 29, 1944, while Faulkner continued to work on the script, and ended on May 10.

The film premiered in New York City on October 11, 1944. Audience reception was generally good. Critic reviews were mixed, with many claiming the film was a remake of Casablanca (1942). Critics specifically mentioned Lauren Bacall's performance or the chemistry between Humphrey Bogart and Lauren Bacall on screen. Bogart and Bacall began an off-screen relationship during production and married in 1945, after the film's release. To Have and Have Not was one of the top 10 grossing films of 1944 and received an award from the National Board of Review.

== Plot ==
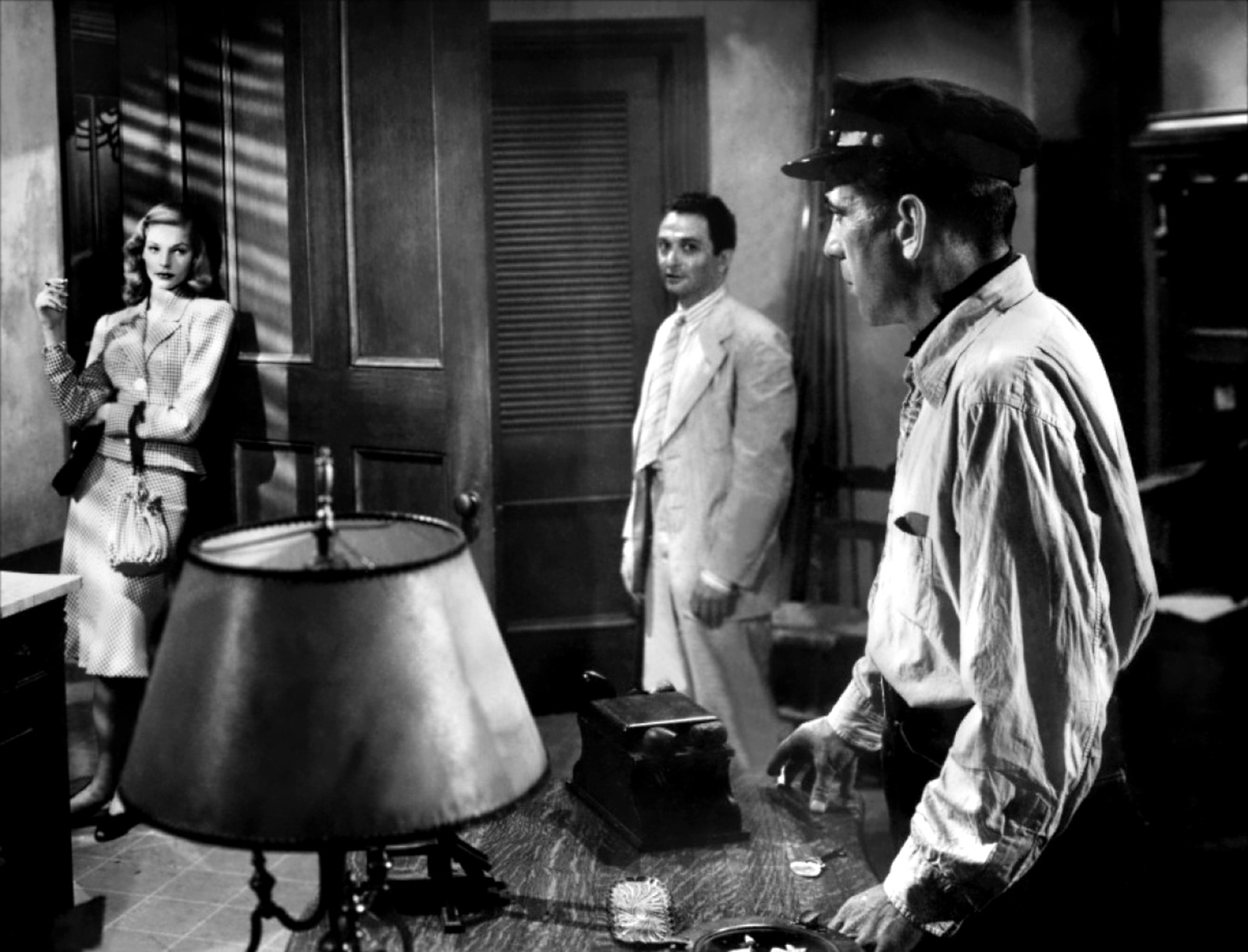
Bacall, Dalio and Bogart together in Bogart's hotel room

In the summer of 1940, world-weary Harry Morgan operates a sport-fishing boat, the Queen Conch, in Fort-de-France, on the French colony of Martinique. It is not long since the fall of France and the island is under the heavy-handed control of pro-German Vichy France. Harry makes a modest living chartering out to tourists, crewed by his blithering friend Eddie.

Harry affectionately looks after Eddie, a one-time top mate reduced to a rummy by alcohol. The island is a tinderbox of dissent, harboring many people sympathetic to Free France. Harry's current charter client, Johnson, owes Harry $825. Johnson claims not to have enough ready money to square his account, but promises to get the funds when the banks open the next day.

Back at his hotel home Harry is approached by its owner, Gérard (known as "Frenchy" to English speakers), who urges Harry to help the French Resistance by smuggling some people onto the island. Harry steadfastly refuses, choosing to keep out of the current political situation. Also at the hotel, Harry first sees Marie ("Slim") Browning, a young American wanderer who has recently arrived on the plane from Rio. Seeking to avoid the advances of a drunken Johnson she volunteers a duet of "Am I Blue" with pianist Cricket and his ensemble in the hotel bar.

A keen observer, Harry notices Slim pick Johnson's pocket, and follows her to her room directly across the hall from his own. He forces her to hand over the wallet, which is found to contain $1,400 in traveler's checks and a plane ticket for early the next morning before the banks open. On returning the wallet to Johnson, Harry demands that he sign the traveler's checks to pay him immediately. Just then a shootout in front of the hotel between police and the Resistance spills over into the bar, and Johnson is killed by a stray bullet. The police take Harry, Slim, and Frenchy for questioning, seizing Johnson's wallet, Harry's passport, and his own money when he proves combative.

Back at the hotel, Gérard offers to hire the penniless Harry to transport Resistance members Paul de Bursac and his wife Hélène from a nearby islet to Martinique. Harry reluctantly accepts. A sexually charged romance has been developing between Harry and Slim, who feels Harry is starting to fall for her. Her hopes are shattered when he uses the bulk of the money he earned in transporting the fugitives to buy her a ticket back home to America on the next plane out.

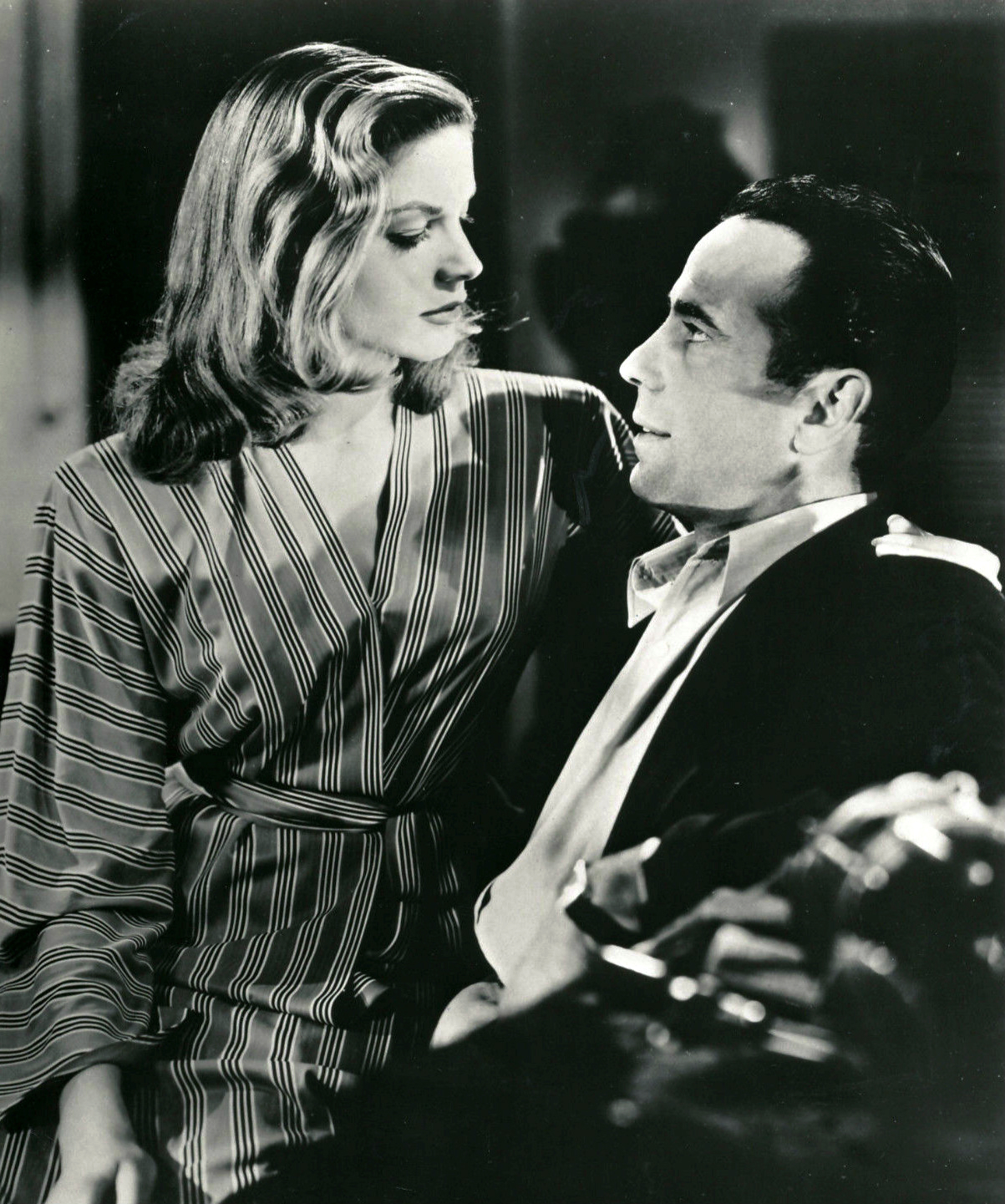
Bogart and Bacall, whose onscreen attraction led to an affair, then a long-term marriage

Harry picks up the de Bursacs, but his boat is seen and fired upon by a navy patrol vessel. De Bursac is wounded, but Harry manages to escape and transfer his passengers to an arranged rowing boat. When he returns to the hotel, he finds Slim still there, having chosen to stay with him. The de Bursacs are hidden in the basement of the hotel; at Frenchy's request, Harry removes the bullet from Paul's shoulder. He learns the couple have come to Martinique to help a man escape from the penal colony at Devil's Island to aid the Free French. De Bursac asks for Harry's assistance in this operation, but Harry respectfully turns him down.

The police return to the hotel and reveal that they recognized Harry's boat the previous night. They also reveal that they have Eddie in custody again, this time withholding liquor from him to get him to reveal the details of the smuggling plot. Cornered in his hotel room by the Vichy authorities, Harry turns the tables, killing one and holding police captain Renard at gunpoint. He forces him to order Eddie's release and sign harbor passes. Harry, Eddie, and Slim then head together for the Queen Conch, with the intention of meeting up with Frenchy and the de Bursacs, to free the man from Devil's Island.

== Cast ==
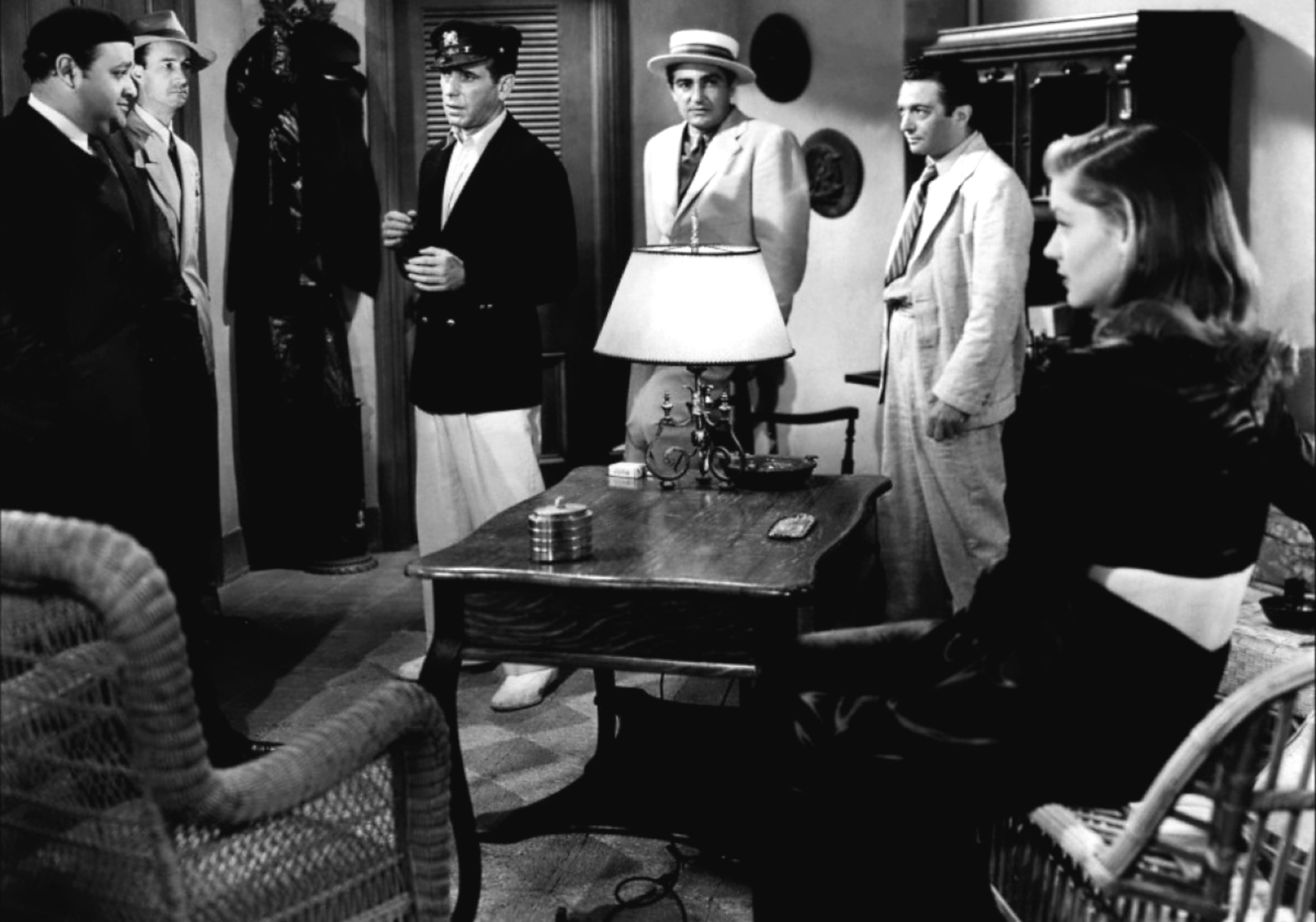
Left to right: Dan Seymour, Aldo Nadi, Humphrey Bogart, Sheldon Leonard, Marcel Dalio and Lauren Bacall in To Have and Have Not

- Humphrey Bogart as Harry "Steve" Morgan. A nearly immediate casting choice, Bogart was cast by Warner Bros in early 1943.
- Walter Brennan as Eddie. Hawks met with Brennan for a pre-production conference in December 1943. Brennan's contract was loaned from Goldwyn for $2,500 per week from March to May 1944 to play Eddie. The agreement included that Brennan's name would appear 60 percent of the size of Bogart's name in the credits.
- Lauren Bacall as Marie "Slim" Browning. At the time of casting, Bacall was an 18-year-old model. She had appeared on the cover of Harper's Bazaar, and was noticed by Hawks's wife, Nancy "Slim" Keith, who showed the cover photo to her husband. Hawks sought Bacall out in April 1943 and signed her for the role, her first movie appearance. In the film, Harry calls her by the nickname "Slim", and she calls him "Steve", the nicknames used between Keith and Hawks. Hawks shot her screen test with contract player John Ridgely in January 1944. Her screen test was the seduction and "whistle" scene. This scene originally written only for the screen test, but Jack L. Warner told Hawks that he needed to integrate it into the film, and so it was later adapted into the film. After the screen test, Hawks signed his first personal contract with an unknown actress with Bacall. After she turned nineteen, Hawks changed her name from Betty Perske, using a variation of her mother's maiden name "Bacal" for her new surname. Hawks had to decide whether the love interest in the film would be split between two female actresses or rest alone on Bacall. Warner Bros was uninterested in Hawks using Bacall and required Hawks to screen test some of the studio's actresses such as Dolores Moran and Georgette McKee. After the success of Bacall's screen test, however, Hawks was confident in Bacall and believed he just needed to convince Feldman, Warner, and Bogart. Bacall was offered the part in early 1944, with half of her contract belonging to Hawks, half belonging to Warner.
- Dolores Moran as Mme Hélène de Bursac. Ann Sheridan was considered for the part of Sylvia/Helen when her character had a larger role in the film. With the part of Sylvia/Helen smaller, Moran was cast as a more voluptuous contrast to slender Bacall.
- Hoagy Carmichael as Cricket. A prominent songwriter, Carmichael was discovered by Hawks at a party. This was his first credited film role. He had previously appeared in Topper.
- Sheldon Leonard as Lieutenant Coyo.
- Walter Surovy as Paul de Bursac.
- Marcel Dalio as Gérard (Frenchy). French actor Dalio had appeared with Bogart as Emil the Croupier in Casablanca.
- Walter Sande as Johnson, Harry's inept charter client.
- Dan Seymour as Capitaine Renard. Seymour, who played Abdul in Casablanca, signed up to play as a Cuban revolutionary and was shocked to notice his character had been removed from the script. Instead, he was given the role of a Vichy policeman, and Hawks insisted he gain weight (he was 300 pounds at the time) as well as sport a slight French accent.
- Aldo Nadi as Renard's bodyguard
- Paul Marion as Beauclère
- Eugene Borden as Quartermaster
- Patricia Shay as Mrs. Beauclère
- Emmett Smith as Bartender
- Pat West as Bartender
- Cee Pee Johnson as Drummer at Bar du Zombie (uncredited)

== Production ==
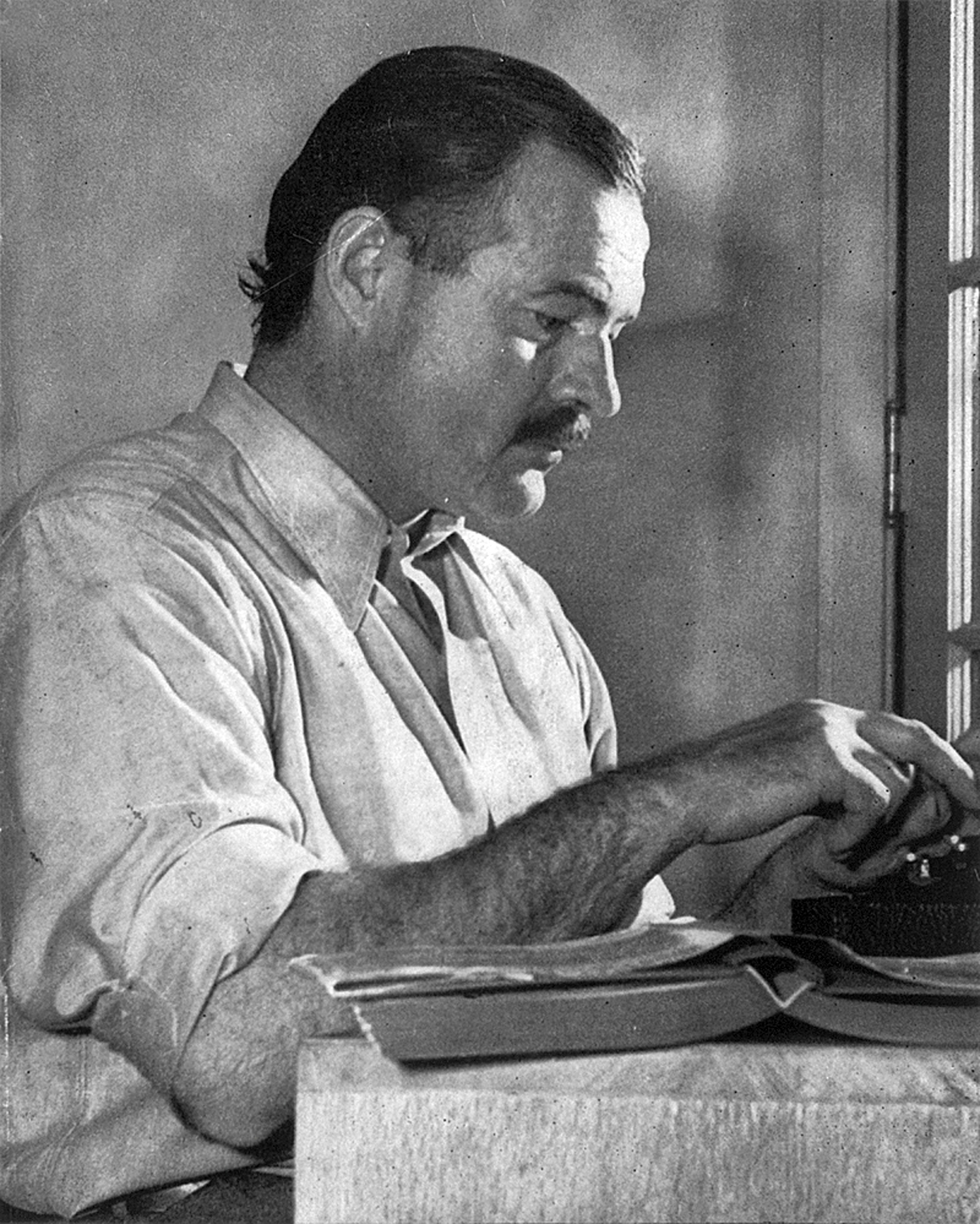
Ernest Hemingway c.1939

On a ten-day fishing trip, independent director Howard Hawks tried to persuade Ernest Hemingway to write him a script, but Hemingway was not interested in working in Hollywood. Hawks insisted he could make a film from Hemingway's "worst story". Although Hawks had a high regard for Hemingway's works in general, he considered To Have and Have Not a "bunch of junk" and told Hemingway so. Hemingway and Hawks worked on the screenplay during the remainder of the fishing trip. They decided the film would not resemble the novel, but rather would tell the story of how Morgan met Marie. Marie's character was extensively altered for the film.

In May 1939, Hemingway sold the book rights to the Hughes Tool Company, with whom Hawks had connections. Hawks bought the book rights in October 1943, then sold them to Warner Bros. Pictures. Because the rights to the novel bounced between sellers, Hawks made ten times more money selling the rights than Hemingway did. On learning this, Hemingway reportedly refused to speak to Hawks for "three months". The screenplay for To Have and Have Not loosely follows the novel's first four chapters, and a few names and personality traits remain, but otherwise the film bears little resemblance to Hemingway's novel.

=== Writing ===
Howard Hawks recruited Jules Furthman to work on the screenplay. Completed on October 12, 1943, the initial screenplay was 207 pages. It resembled the novel more than the final screenplay did. By the end of December, Furthman had completed a revised screenplay with sixty fewer pages. Hawks instructed Furthman to alter Marie's character to be more sultry and masculine like Marlene Dietrich. In the previous version of the script, Bacall's purse was stolen; after the revision, Bacall's character stole the purse. Much of Bacall's character was based on Hawks's wife Slim Keith. Some of her lines reportedly came directly from Keith. According to Keith, Furthman even suggested she ask for script credit. Hawks instructed Furthman to work on the final screenplay and stop writing the second version of the screenplay. The second version had Bacall as a minor character in case she proved to be poor for the role. Furthman worked on the screenplay throughout January and February 1944 and recruited Cleve F. Adams and Whitman Chambers to help him with the work. He completed it before February 14, 1944.

Joseph Breen read the script and cited three dozen instances that violated the Production Code, citing that Morgan was portrayed as an unpunished murderer and the women as suggested prostitutes. He stated that the characters must be softened, the studio must remove all suggestions of inappropriate sexual relations between men and women, and that murder must be made clear to appear as self-defense. As the movie was filmed during World War II, Hawks moved the setting from Cuba to Vichy-controlled Martinique as required by the Office of the Coordinator of Inter-American Affairs to placate the Roosevelt administration. They objected to the unfavorable portrayal of Cuba's government as against the U.S. government's "Good Neighbor" policy toward Latin American nations. Writer William Faulkner was hired on by Hawks on February 22, 1944, to avoid recounting political conflict between Free France and the Vichy government in the story line and to satisfy the Production Code. It was reportedly Faulkner's idea to change the setting of the film to Martinique, because he had been working on an unproduced story line involving Charles de Gaulle, so he was familiar with the details. Furthman stopped writing after Faulkner was brought on the project.

Faulkner and Hemingway never met, but To Have and Have Not is considered by Charles M. Oliver the best adaptation for film of Hemingway's novels. In order to satisfy the Production Code, Faulkner wrote that every character would sleep in the same hotel, but put Morgan and Marie's bedrooms across from each other to facilitate interactions between them as well as reducing Marie's drinking in the film. He also removed scenes in which Morgan appeared to be a murderer. Other additions included Marie becoming Morgan's sole romantic interest and Helen and her husband becoming fighters for the resistance. Finally, Faulkner made the time frame for the film three days instead of the many months depicted in the novel. Hawks intended to have the screenplay be loosely modeled on Casablanca, which also starred Humphrey Bogart, hoping for the same success Casablanca had met at the box office.

=== Filming ===
Production began on February 29, 1944, with only 36 pages of the screenplay written, due to changes required by the Production Code office. Faulkner had very little time in between the rebuilding of sets to continue the screenplay, therefore, each scene was written three days before it was filmed. The final cast reading was done on March 6, 1944, with final script changes finished by April 22. Line by line, Hawks and Bogart changed the script to create a more sexual and comedic film. For example, the line "It's even better when you help" was not originally in the script and was added during filming. After 62 days, filming was completed May 10, 1944. Bogart and Hawks served as their own technical advisers because of their experience with fishing and sailing.

After filming began, a romance developed between Bogart and Bacall, despite Hawks's disapproval. Bogart was married and 45 years old, more than twice Bacall's age. They kept their relationship a secret from Hawks. This romance eventually led to Bogart divorcing Mayo Methot, his third wife. He and Bacall married a year after To Have and Have Not and remained married until Bogart's death in 1957. Hawks expanded Bacall's part to take advantage of the Bogart-Bacall chemistry. According to the documentary, "A Love Story: The Story of To Have and Have Not", included on the 2003 DVD release, Hawks recognized the star-making potential of the film for Bacall. He emphasized her role and downplayed Dolores Moran's role, the film's other female lead. (Hawks and Moran had their own affair during production). Two weeks before the end of production, Bacall was called to Hawks's home. Hawks told her Bogart did not love her, and she was in danger of losing career opportunities. After he threatened to send her to B-list Monogram Pictures, Bacall was very upset. She told Bogart, and he became upset with Hawks. This caused an argument between Hawks and Bogart, stunting production for two weeks. Bogart recognized his power and used negotiation to his advantage. After negotiating with Warner, Bogart received an extra $33,000 salary, as long as Bogart promised to no longer stall production.

=== Direction ===
In her autobiography, Lauren Bacall described what she called Hawks's "brilliantly creative work method" on set. She described that every morning on set, Hawks would sit with Bacall, Bogart, and whoever else was in the scene in chairs in a circle as a script girl read the scene. After reading through the scene, Hawks would add sexual dialogue and innuendo between Bacall and Bogart. After Hawks and Bogart felt the changes were adequate, Hawks would add one light on the set and they would go through the scene. Hawks would encourage them to move freely and do what felt comfortable for them. After going through the scenes a few times, cinematographer Sidney Hickox would discuss camera set ups with Hawks.

According to biographer Todd McCarthy, To Have and Have Not is a quintessential Hawks film. It contains classic Hawksian characters such as the strong male and his female counterpart. He also states that although elements of Hemingway, Faulkner, and Casablanca can be found in the film, it represents Hawks's capacity for expression, claiming it is, "beyond doubt, exactly the work its director intended it to be, and would have been nothing like this in the hands of anyone else."

=== Music ===
Cricket, the piano player in the hotel bar, was played by the singer-songwriter Hoagy Carmichael. In the course of the movie, Cricket and Slim perform "How Little We Know", by Carmichael and Johnny Mercer, and "Am I Blue?", by Harry Akst and Grant Clarke. Cricket and the band also perform "Hong Kong Blues", by Carmichael and Stanley Adams. "The Rhumba Jumps", by Mercer and Carmichael, is performed by the hotel band. Bacall shimmies out at the end of the movie to a faster "How Little We Know". The song "Baltimore Oriole" was intended to be Bacall's theme for the movie, but was merely added as background music on the soundtrack due to Bacall's vocal inexperience. Background music or nondiegetic music is minimal in the picture. However, the film score including the main title was composed by Franz Waxman. One music cue, 7b, is credited to William Lava on the original cue sheet. William Lava was a music staffer at Warner Bros who regularly contributed additional cues.

According to professor of film studies Ian Brookes, Howard Hawks uses jazz, particularly through interracial performance scenes, to underscore anti-fascism in the story line of the film. A persistent myth is that a teenage Andy Williams, the future singing star, dubbed the singing for Bacall. According to authoritative sources, including Hawks and Bacall, this was not true. Williams and some female singers were tested to dub for Bacall because of fears she lacked the necessary vocal skills. But those fears were overshadowed by the desire to have Bacall do her own singing (perhaps championed by Bogart) despite her less than perfect vocal talent. This myth is disputed in Leonard Maltin's Movie Guide entry for this film, but is propagated in a 1986 episode of MacGyver, entitled "Three for the Road". Several sources on the film set have stated this myth is false. It has been argued that Bacall's low singing voice in the film helps her character establish a form of masculine dominance.

=== Cultural references ===
In one scene, Marie says to Morgan, "I'm hard to get, Steve. All you have to do is ask me." This quote came from the earlier 1939 Hawks film Only Angels Have Wings in which Jean Arthur says to Cary Grant, "I'm hard to get, Geoff. All you have to do is ask me."

== Release ==
Warner Bros. released To Have and Have Not on October 11, 1944.

== Reception ==
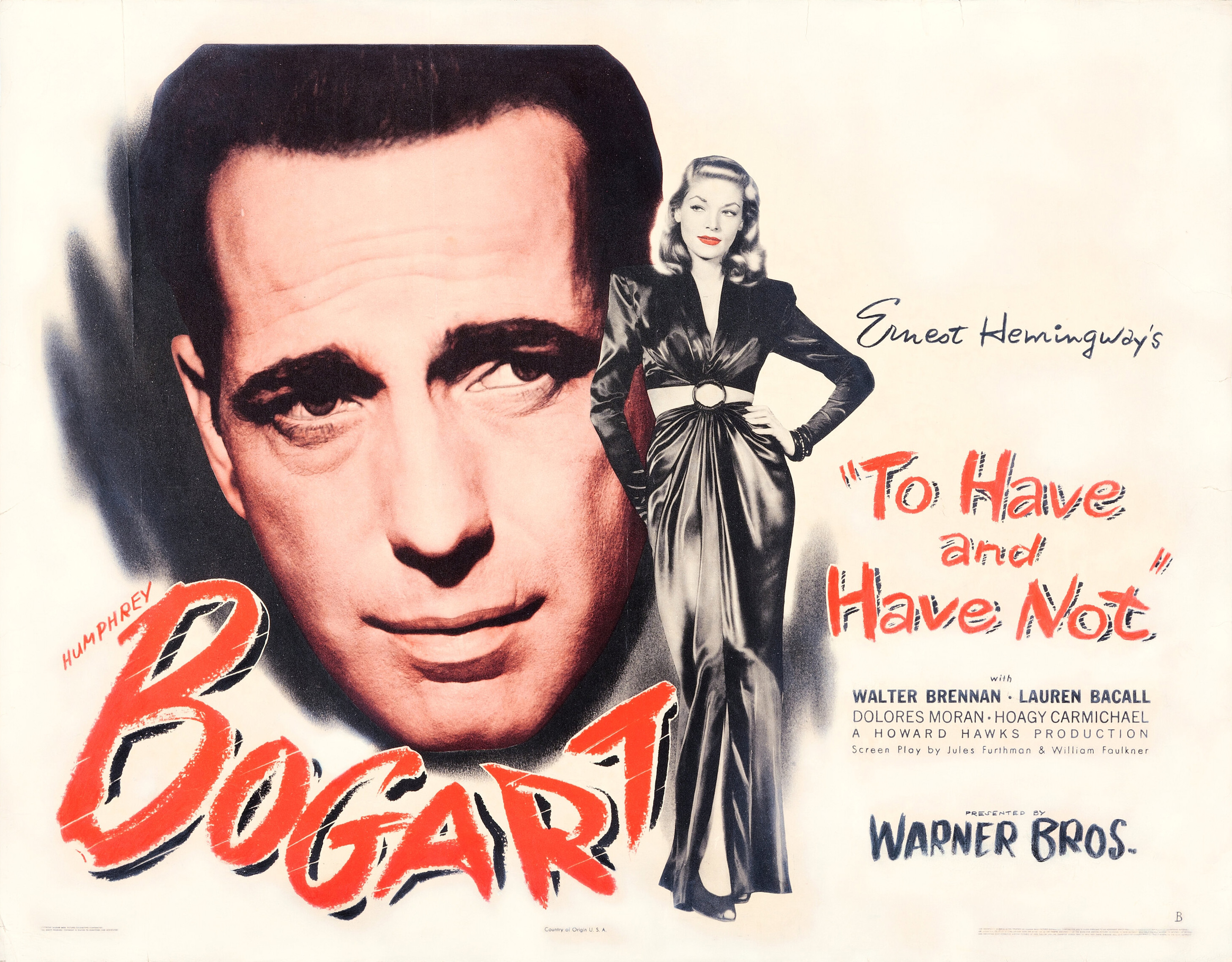
Poster for To Have and Have Not

The critical reception of To Have and Have Not at the time of release was mixed and often unflattering. Early publicity and much of the initial reaction focused on Lauren Bacall, either praising her or criticizing her part as merely a gimmick for attention from the press. Some also faulted the film's unfaithfulness to Hemingway, as only the first fifteen minutes resemble his novel. Further, Americans preoccupied with World War II may have had little interest in a hero (Morgan) who consistently rejects commitment and whose only interest in France's cause is financial, to help himself and his girl (Marie). Overall, critics called the film a fast, witty romance whose plot was merely "an excuse for some good scenes". Variety cited its inferiority to Casablanca and other Warner Bros. melodramas, but acknowledged the new film's success in its characterization. Others even considered it a Casablanca remake; Time called it a "tinny romantic melodrama which millions of cinemaddicts have been waiting for ever since Casablanca." New York Variety was more mixed, citing "nifty productional accoutrements" but "too unsteady" a story line. The American film critic James Agee liked the film but felt Going My Way was better, because To Have and Have Not focused too much on "character and atmosphere" rather than on plot. He was far more interested in Bacall's performance than the anti-Fascist themes in the film. He further stated: "But To Have and Have Not is neither an action picture nor a Bogart picture. Its story is, in fact, just a loosely painted background for a kind of romance which the movies have all but forgotten about—the kind in which the derelict sweethearts are superficially aloof but essentially hot as blazes ... Lauren Bacall has cinema personality to burn, and she burns both ends against an unusually little middle. Her personality is compounded partly of percolated Davis, Garbo, West, Dietrich, Harlow and Glenda Farrell, but more than enough of it is completely new to the screen."

Critic Pauline Kael wrote, "Howard Hawks directed this slickly professional, thoroughly enjoyable Second World War melodrama ... Don't be misled: it's the Warners mixture as before—sex and politics—but better this time."

The film was one of the top 10 grossing pictures of 1944. According to Warner Bros records the film earned $3,652,000 ($66,790,000 in 2025 terms) domestically and $1,605,000 ($29,350,000 in 2025 terms) foreign, coming close to the high earnings of Casablanca.

On review aggregator Rotten Tomatoes, To Have and Have Not has a 95% approval rating based on 37 reviews and an average rating of 8.10/10. The critical consensus states, "With Howard Hawks directing and Bogey and Bacall in front of the cameras, To Have and Have Not benefits from several levels of fine-tuned chemistry—all of which ignite on screen." Metacritic, which uses a weighted average, assigned the film a score of 90 out of 100, based on 16 critics, indicating "universal acclaim".

== Awards ==
Award	Category	Subject	Result
National Board of Review Awards	Best Actor	Humphrey Bogart	Won

== Analysis ==
Screenwriter and film critic Paul Schrader classified the film as noir, made during the first or "wartime" period of film noir. Some other scholars categorize the film as noir, while some argue Howard Hawks never made a true "noir". The names of the characters in To Have and Have Not are directly related to the quality of the characters. Characters that are meant to elicit sympathy from the viewer are known by their nicknames: Steve, Slim, Eddie, Frenchy, and Cricket. In this way, Hawks creates the illusion of a character by devoiding it of past and present social roles that may be associated with a surname. Villains or corrupted characters are called by their surnames such as Johnson.

=== Anti-fascism ===
According to English film critic Robin Wood, To Have and Have Not presents "one of the most basic anti-fascist statements the cinema has given us." The film portrays anti-fascist themes common to the time period through its emphasis on individual liberty expressed through Bogart's character and through its representation of people progressing and working together well. When he decides to join the resistance cause, Morgan reasons, "maybe because I like you and maybe because I don't like them." Some critics saw this anti-fascist statement as more powerful because it comes from instinct rather than an expected ideology. More generally, Hawks expresses a protest of authoritarianism and infringement of individual rights. Hawks, however, claimed he was uninterested in politics and the focus of the movie was on the relationship between Bogart and Bacall. Regardless, the anti-fascist themes come through in the relationship between Bogart and Bacall. They represent the individual standing up to those who abuse their power. According to Ian Brookes, during the scene where Bacall sings "Am I Blue?" with Hoagy Carmichael, her low-voice establishes herself as "one of the boys" and thus a "soldier" in the anti-fascist cause. Moreover, during this scene, the patrons at the bar represent different races and are racially integrated throughout the space, challenging the ideas of segregation and race during the time period. The next song, Hong Kong Blues is reminiscent of Django Reinhardt's pre-war version. This represents French resistance spirit as swing music became a symbol of resistance in France, because it was the only available example of American culture in France at the time.

=== Harry Morgan ===
A common theme of war films such as To Have and Have Not is the conversion narrative. An individual who originally does not want to be involved in the war effort eventually becomes converted through a changed attitude and accepts their duty as a citizen to participate in the war efforts. Along with Harry Morgan's transformation, the Humphrey Bogart persona changed along the years, making him an important casting decision for the film. Harry Morgan, the fisherman, represents the center of the story line of To Have and Have Not. According to Robin Wood, Harry Morgan represents, at the same time, the personality of Humphrey Bogart and the Hawksian hero. Harry Morgan as a character represents a myth the audience accepts as real such as the heroes of Homer. Morgan represents the heroic ideal. Morgan acts on his own interests, yet is not self-indulgent, minding his "own business". He does good because of the responsibility he feels he has for his personal alliances. Morgan controls and establishes the morality of the film through the distinctness of what one does and what one is. Bogart's character establishes that one's personal identity is not determined by one's actions if they do not allow it to happen. In the film, Slim steals Johnson's wallet. Harry overlooks this to a point because Johnson did not pay Morgan for his services as a boat captain. When they are both approached by Morgan, Slim shows no shame, indicating her actions were not in conflict with morality. Johnson, however, shows shame and does not receive sympathy. Bogart's character is direct and blunt, yet makes an effort to not judge a person by their actions. Harry Morgan encompasses the qualities of the "Hawksian" hero due to his personal integrity, and at the same time, could be described as a Hemingway code hero because of his courage and loyalty.

One of the biggest differences between the film and the novel is the resolution of Harry Morgan. In the novel, Morgan is beaten down through the story line and perishes in the end. In the film, however, Morgan ends up a winner. This was specifically altered by Hawks because he did not like stories about "losers".

== Legacy ==
With some regarding To Have and Have Not as one of Hawks's best, the film represents the only time two Nobel Prize winners, Faulkner and Hemingway, worked on the same film story. Some of Bacall's lines became renowned as double entendre; for instance, "You know how to whistle, don't you, Steve? You just put your lips together and ... blow ..." (said while looking at him provocatively). This quote is ranked at #34 on AFI's 100 Years...100 Movie Quotes list. When Humphrey Bogart was buried, Bacall put a gold whistle with the inscription "If you want anything, just whistle" in his coffin, a nod to her line in their first film together.

== Influences and adaptations ==
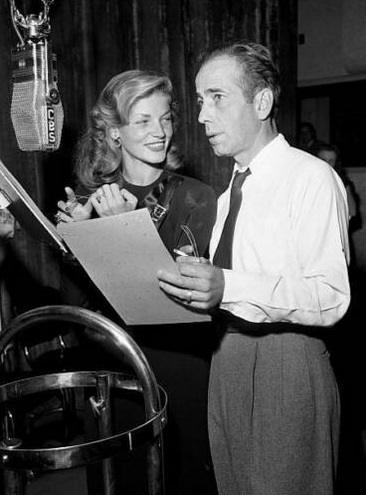
Bacall and Bogart present "To Have and Have Not" on Lux Radio Theatre (October 14, 1946)

To Have and Have Not is noted for its similarity to earlier films Casablanca (1942), Morocco (1930), Road to Morocco (1942), and Across the Pacific (1942). There are some similarities to the plot of the earlier Casablanca, and both stories involve the French Resistance. Other changes from Hemingway tended in the same direction, such as the introduction of a sympathetic piano player as an important supporting character. Carmichael's Cricket was not in the Hemingway book, and parallels Dooley Wilson's Sam in Casablanca. Several cast members from Casablanca also appear in the film; apart from Bogart and Dalio (Emil in Casablanca), Dan Seymour (Abdul in Casablanca) plays Captain Renard, whose name and position resemble Captain Renault in Casablanca. As in Casablanca, Bogart's initially reluctant character assists husband-and-wife Resistance members.

To Have and Have Not was adapted as an hour-long radio play for Lux Radio Theatre, with Bogart and Bacall reprising their screen roles. It was broadcast on October 14, 1946.

Warner Brothers adapted the novel a second time with the film The Breaking Point (1950) directed by Michael Curtiz, who was also credited for Casablanca. This screenplay stayed closer to the novel; it bore little resemblance to the 1944 film. Screenwriter Ranald MacDougall and Curtiz were interested in creating a film more closely modeled after Hemingway's novel, without the original film's resemblances to Casablanca. Despite the film's faithfulness to the novel, it remains less popular than To Have and Have Not, though Hemingway said the remake "suited him". The film was remade another time in 1958 by director Don Siegel as The Gun Runners. Siegel was reluctant to remake the film, but "needed the money". The film was shot quickly and cheaply. Author Gene D. Phillips called The Gun Runners a "crass exploitation of the Hemingway book".

In 1956, the story was reworked as an episode of the Western TV series Cheyenne entitled "Fury at Rio Hondo." The episode was credited solely to James Gunn, despite using significant portions of the original work's dialogue.

From 1951 to 1952, Humphrey Bogart and Lauren Bacall participated in a weekly half-hour radio adventure series called Bold Venture, intended to be a spin-off of To Have and Have Not.

Bacall to Arms is a 1946 Looney Tunes short, spoofing scenes from To Have and Have Not, and featuring "Bogey Gocart" and "Laurie Bee Cool." It is included as a special feature on the DVD release of To Have and Have Not.
