= John Alton =

American-Hungarian cinematographer (1901–1996)

- Screen-capture
- Born: Johann Jacob Altmann; October 5, 1901; Sopron, Kingdom of Hungary, Austro-Hungarian Empire
- Died: June 2, 1996 (aged 94); Santa Monica, California
- Occupation: Cinematographer
- Spouses: Rozalia Kiss, Billie

John Alton (born Johann Jacob Altmann; October 5, 1901 – June 2, 1996) was an American cinematographer of Hungarian-Austrian origin. Alton photographed some of the most famous films noir of the classic period and won an Academy Award for the cinematography of An American in Paris (1951), becoming the first Hungarian-born person to do so in the cinematography category. He also worked as a director during the Golden Age of Argentine cinema. His work has been honored at film festivals in Vienna, Japan, Argentina, Telluride, and San Francisco, as well as in retrospectives at the American Museum of the Moving Image and the Pacific Film Archives.

== Career ==
Alton had an early interest in photography. At the age of 5 he already had a darkroom and soon became interested in filmmaking. To attend college, he moved to New York to live with his prosperous uncle and pursue studies in photochemistry. He first became involved in the film industry when he was spotted by a gateman at Cosmopolitan Studios in New York looking for extras. There, he had the opportunity to appear alongside Marion Davies, an experience that left a lasting impression on him. He began as a lab technician at MGM film in Los Angeles in the 1920s, later becoming a cameraman within four years. He worked as an assistant cameraman for Woody Van Dyke Western movies, until he moved to France with Ernst Lubitsch to film backgrounds for The Student Prince in Old Heidelberg (1927) and ended up staying for one year heading the camera department of Paramount Pictures's Joinville Studios in Paris and traveled extensively across Europe and Asia for filming. He claimed he discovered Maurice Chevalier.

In 1932, he moved to Argentina where he shot many Spanish-language films, the first one being 'Los tres Berretines' (The Three Amateurs) starring Luis Sandrini. He designed the country's first sound film studio for Lumiton in Buenos Aires and Argentina Sono Film. First he intended to stay for a year but ended up staying for seven. He won a prize for best photography in Argentina in 1937.

He returned to Hollywood in the late 1930s. After enjoying great creative freedom in Argentina, the prospect of becoming a Hollywood producer held little appeal for him. The next seven years he shot 30 B-movies, mostly for Republic Pictures and RKO. In this period he realised, he wasn't suited for directing because he was too focused on the lighting of actors' faces, not their dialogue. He then worked with director Anthony Mann to make movies like T-Men (1947) and Devil's Doorway (1950) and became one of the most sought-after cinematographers of the time being known for unconventional camera angles—especially low camera shots.

As a cameraman, he preferred meticulously planning shots to effectively convey a film's emotional atmosphere, an approach that became a defining characteristic of his work. He had the strong belief that lighting in a scene must convey meaning and establish mood, rather than merely illuminating the set. In his opinion a studio lighting setup should mirror natural lighting. One of his particular talents was bringing a certain "blackness" into the picture and accentuating some parts with lights of higher intensity. One unusual concept was to achieve depth by placing the brightest light in the background - furthest from the camera. Shooting in Black and White was his preference, because he could "see more in the dark than I could in color,” he said.

He was enthusiastic about that aspect of his work and became frustrated by directors who were unwilling to engage in a collaborative dialogue about lighting and its role in visual storytelling. His style is most notable in the films noir: He Walked by Night (1948), The Amazing Mr. X (1948), Raw Deal (1948) and The Big Combo (1955).

Alton also photographed many color movies including Slightly Scarlet (a color film noir) which was the 6th and last collaboration between him and director Allan Dwan.

When returning to MGM, he worked with Vincente Minnelli for 10 years including on Father of the Bride (1950) and An American in Paris (1951), for which he won the Academy Award for Best Color Cinematography with Alfred Gilks. For the 17 minute long ballet scene in this movie, he used a mobile camera and over 20 distinct movements and abrupt lighting changes mid shot. Father of the Bride was shot in just 28 days. He also worked multiple times with Richard Brooks including on Battle Circus (1953) and The Brothers Karamazov (1958). Beside that he also did some experimenting with 3D-filmmaking during the fifties.

Alton resigned from the American Society of Cinematographers (ASC) in January 1944, reportedly due to conflicts with ASC founding member and MGM camera department head John Arnold. He was reinstated at his request less than a year later, with the help of Leon Shamroy, but ended up resigning a second and final time in March 1954 after a personal dispute with the president.

Alton's last film was Elmer Gantry (1960). There he used utilized 'concealed lighting' to emphasize the character's inherent worthlessness, with the visual narrative reflecting Gantry's y nature. He also worked with director Charles Crichton on Birdman of Alcatraz (1962) but both were fired after two weeks. Being exhausted from battling studios over artistic quality versus profit, he retired as a filmmaker.

== Reception ==
Alton's influential legacy was not always so celebrated, however; in fact, his achievements nearly slipped into oblivion before being rediscovered much later. Alton was an influence for many in the industry.

- Cinematographer Haskell Wexler for example described how Alton's book "Painting with light" influenced his work. The producer Arthur Freed commended John Alton, stating that his photography was instrumental in 'saving the picture,' highlighting the critical role of Alton's visual contributions to the film's success.
- Critic Andrew Sarris described John Alton's 'Slightly Scarlet' as 'one of the most eye-boggling American movies ever made,' highlighting its visually striking and memorable qualities.
- In 1990, Todd McCarthy, Stuart Samuels, and Arnold Glassman honored Altons work by initiatiating the production of 'Visions of Light,' a documentary intended to show Alton's contributions to cinematography and exhibit his work.

== Television ==
In 1966, Alton shot the pilot for Mission: Impossible, which became a successful television series.

== Book ==
Alton wrote Painting with Light (1949), one of the first books written by a working studio cinematographer. The book put forth several controversial theories for the day, such as depth is created by placing the brightest object in the scene furthest from the camera, and that studio lighting must always simulate natural light in texture and direction. It addresses both conventional and unconventional methods of studio motion-picture lighting. Despite the vast technical advances achieved within the motion picture industry much of the content is still pertinent. Painting with Light (1949) contains essential reading for any budding filmmaker with detailed information and ideas for lighting several difficult interior and exterior setups and situations. The table of contents includes chapters such as "Mystery Lighting", "Special Illumination", and "Visual Symphony", touching on topics like "What is thinking?" and Chinese ideograms.

== Personal life ==
Shortly after arriving in Buenos Aires, Alton married Rozalia - a former beauty queen who had previously interviewed him during his voyage to South America. After quitting the movie industry, they kept out of the public eye and traveled the world until the early 1980s living in Europe, South America, South Africa and Asia. They met while he was in Argentina and were married for 55 years until her death. In 1986, he married Billie, who died in the early 1990s. He stepped back into the public eye in 1993, answering questions and attending screenings at film festivals such as the Telluride Film Festival. After his retirement, John Alton remained a passionate reader and also began oil painting, creating over a hundred small canvases which he subsequently gave away.

== Death ==
John Alton died June 2, 1996, in Santa Monica, California. He was 94.

== Filmography ==
- The Student Prince in Old Heidelberg (1927)
- The Man Who Murdered (1930)
- L'Homme qui assassina (1930)
- Los tres berretines (1933)
- El hijo de papá (1933)
- Crimen a las tres (1935)
- Big Calibre (1935)
- Escala en la ciudad (1935)
- Puerto Nuevo (1936)
- Compañeros (1936)
- Loco lindo (1936)
- Tararira (1936)
- Goal (1936)
- Amalia (1936)
- El Pobre Pérez (1937)
- Palermo (1937)
- La vida bohemia (1938)
- Honeysuckle (1938)
- Puerta cerrada (1938)
- Cadetes de San Martín (1939)
- El último encuentro (1939)
- Caminito de Gloria (1939)
- Puerta cerrada (1939)
- Doce mujeres (1939)
- El matrero (1939)
- Remedy for Riches (1940)
- Dr. Christian Meets the Women (1940)
- Three Faces West (1940)
- The Courageous Dr. Christian (1940)
- The Devil Pays Off (1941)
- Forced Landing (1941)
- Melody for Three (1941)
- Power Dive (1941)
- Mr. District Attorney in the Carter Case (1941)
- The Affairs of Jimmy Valentine (1942)
- Ice-Capades Revue (1942)
- Johnny Doughboy (1942)
- Moonlight Masquerade (1942)
- Pardon My Stripes (1942)
- The Sultan's Daughter (1943)
- She's for Me (1943)
- The Lady and the Monster (1944)
- Lake Placid Serenade (1944)
- Storm Over Lisbon (1944)
- Enemy of Women (1944)
- Atlantic City (1944)
- The Captain from Köpenick (1945)
- Girls of the Big House (1945)
- Song of Mexico (1944)
- Love, Honor and Goodbye (1945)
- I Was a Criminal (1945)
- Affairs of Geraldine (1946)
- A Guy Could Change (1946)
- The Madonna's Secret (1946)
- Murder in the Music Hall (1946)
- One Exciting Week (1946)
- The Magnificent Rogue (1947)
- The Ghost Goes Wild (1947)
- Hit Parade of 1947 (1947)
- T-Men (1947)
- The Trespasser (1947)
- Winter Wonderland (1947)
- Wyoming (1947)
- Bury Me Dead (1947)
- The Pretender (1947)
- Driftwood (1947)
- He Walked by Night (1948)
- Hollow Triumph (1948)
- The Amazing Mr. X (1948)
- Canon City (1948)
- Raw Deal (1948)
- Border Incident (1949)
- The Crooked Way (1949)
- Captain China (1949)
- Reign of Terror (1949)
- Red Stallion in the Rockies (1949)
- Mystery Street (1950)
- Father of the Bride (1950)
- Grounds for Marriage (1950)
- Devil's Doorway (1950)
- An American in Paris (1951) (ballet photography)
- The People Against O'Hara (1951)
- Father's Little Dividend (1951)
- It's a Big Country (1951)
- Talk About a Stranger (1952)
- Washington Story (1952)
- Apache War Smoke (1952)
- Count the Hours (1952)
- Battle Circus (1953)
- Take the High Ground! (1953)
- I, the Jury (1953)
- Cattle Queen of Montana (1954)
- Silver Lode (1954)
- Witness to Murder (1954)
- Duffy of San Quentin (1954)
- Passion (1954)
- Tennessee's Partner (1955)
- The Big Combo (1955)
- Pearl of the South Pacific (1955)
- Escape to Burma (1955)
- The Teahouse of the August Moon (1956)
- Slightly Scarlet (1956)
- The Catered Affair (1956)
- Tea and Sympathy (1956)
- Designing Woman (1957)
- The Brothers Karamazov (1958)
- Lonelyhearts (1958)
- 12 to the Moon (1960)
- Elmer Gantry (1960)

== Accolades ==
Wins

- Academy Awards: Oscar, Best Cinematography, Color; An American in Paris, shared with: Alfred Gilks; 1951.

Nominations

- Laurel Awards: Golden Laurel, Top Cinematography, Color, The Brothers Karamazov, 4th place; 1959.

Other honors

- Los Angeles Film Critics Association Awards: Career Achievement Award; 1992.

== Sources ==
- Harry Tomicek: Das grosse Schwarz. Border Incident, von Anthony Mann, Kamera: John Alton (1949). In: Christian Cargnelli, Michael Omasta (eds.): Schatten. Exil. Europäische Emigranten im Film noir. PVS, Vienna 1997. ISBN 3-901196-26-9.
