= Eagle-Lion Films =

British-American film production company

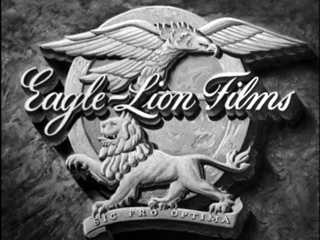
- Industry: Film studio
- Founded: December 1945; 80 years ago
- Defunct: 1950; 76 years ago
- Successor: Company: Eagle-Lion Classics; Library: Paramount Pictures (through Melange Pictures); Metro-Goldwyn-Mayer (through United Artists) (with some exceptions)
- Key people: J. Arthur Rank; Arthur B. Krim

Eagle-Lion Films was the name of two distinct, though related, companies. In 1944, UK film magnate J. Arthur Rank created an American distribution company with the name to handle his British films. The following year, under a reciprocal distribution arrangement with Rank, the U.S. company Pathé Industries, which already owned the small Producers Releasing Corporation (PRC) studio, established an Eagle-Lion Films production subsidiary, while Rank's American business dropped the name. PRC, with its existing distribution exchanges, handled releases in the U.S. When PRC shut down in 1948, its distribution exchanges were assumed by Eagle-Lion Films. In 1950, Pathé merged Eagle-Lion with an independent reissues distributor, Film Classics, to create Eagle-Lion Classics. The latter was acquired by and merged into United Artists a year later. Rank also released films in the United Kingdom through Eagle-Lion Distributors Limited.

== History ==
Pathé Industries' Eagle-Lion Films subsidiary was founded in December 1945. From 1946 to 1949, Eagle-Lion was led by Arthur B. Krim; in addition to releasing films by Rank and reissues of David O. Selznick films, it produced its own B-movies. Bryan Foy, the former head of the B-picture unit at Warner Bros., was in charge of production. Some of the producers working at Eagle-Lion included Aubrey Schenck, Jack Schwarz, and briefly, Walter Wanger and George Pal. Directors included Anthony Mann. Cinematographer John Alton also worked on its productions.

The initial arrangement was that Rank and Eagle-Lion would each produce five films a year. Costs were initially kept to less than $500,000 per film. Their first-year films were financed with $8 million in loans from the Bank of America, which Robert R. Young personally guaranteed.

The company recorded a loss of $2.2 million in 1947. Krim later attributed this to them paying too much money for stars who were scarcely good enough to prevent insufficient box-office returns. This encouraged Eagle-Lion to change its mode of production, using more independent producers as a source for new films. Bryan Foy resigned as head of production to become an independent producer for the company, and Arthur Krim became studio chief. Eagle-Lion helped finance the films and offer facilities, although producers found their own money, too. Along with Foy, other independent producers who worked for Eagle-Lion included Edward Small, Walter Wanger, and George Pal. They began making lower-budgeted films, enjoying particular success with film noir.

Eagle-Lion had acquired the film studio of Producers Releasing Corporation (PRC), which had acquired the building from the no-longer extant Grand National Pictures. PRC was dissolved in August 1947, and its product was shifted to Eagle-Lion.

By 1947–48, the studio had completed 14 productions. By the spring of 1949, ten were in release, five of which earned a substantial profit – T-Men, Raw Deal, Canon City, He Walked By Night, and The Noose Hangs High. Two others broke even and two others showed losses. If the company had completely financed these films, it would have made $1.2 million, but as it was, it made $200,000. However, because of its unsuccessful first year, the company still owed money and closed its studio in November 1948.

Eagle-Lion released a series of British films, most of which were unsuccessful at the American box office. Some exceptions occurred, such as The Red Shoes, which earned rentals of $5 million as well as being their only release to be nominated for the Academy Award for Best Picture.

The company suffered increasing financial difficulties throughout 1949. Krim resigned in May and the company ceased production at the end of the year. Eagle-Lion merged with Film Classics in 1950 to become Eagle-Lion Classics.

Assistant director Reggie Callow felt that the studio would have survived longer had it kept producing low-budget films rather than attempting to compete with the major studios by making higher-budgeted films.

In 1951, Krim was offered the leadership of United Artists. In April of that year, UA took over distribution of Eagle-Lion's current releases; Eagle-Lion terminated the releasing pact with Rank and ceased distributing movies. Their studios were sold. In 1954, the film lot was purchased by the Ziv Company for production of its syndicated television programs. It has long since been demolished.
