= John McGuire (actor) =

American actor

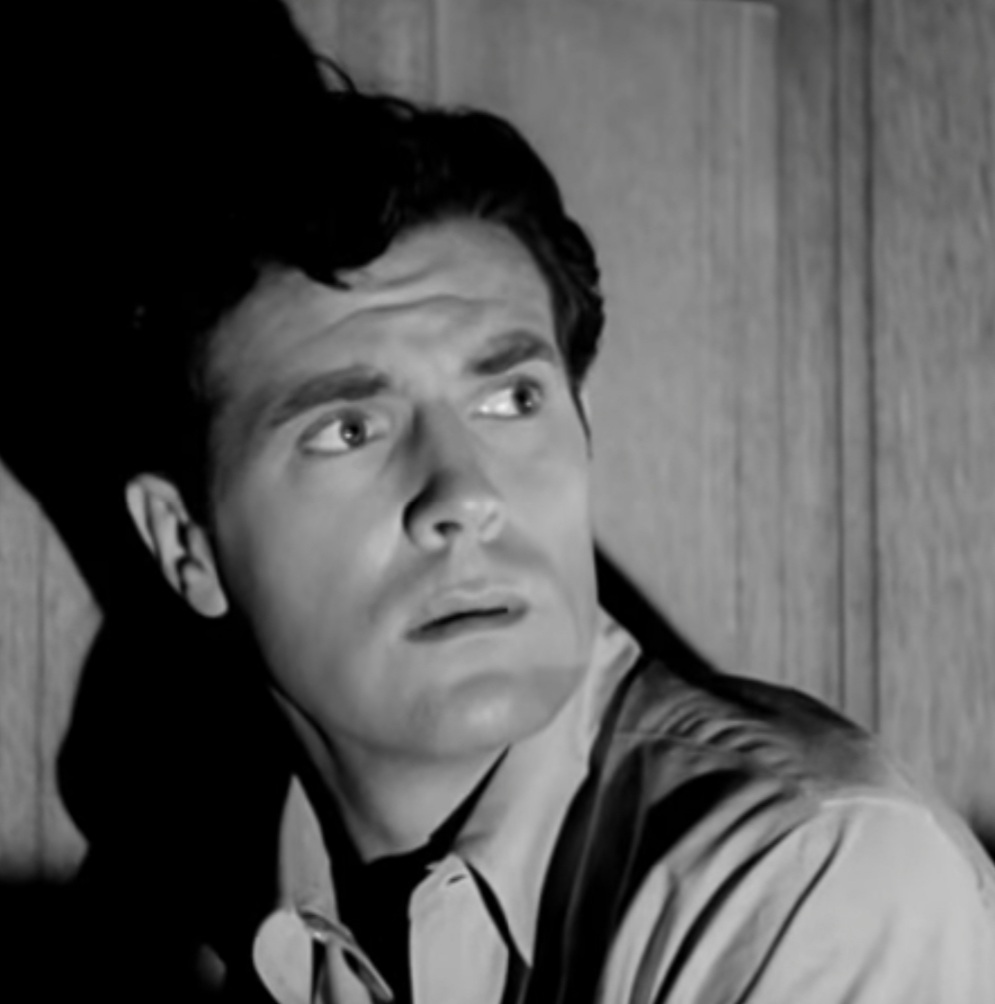
- Born: October 22, 1910
- Died: September 30, 1980 (aged 69)
- Occupation: Actor
- Years active: 1932–1952

John McGuire (October 22, 1910 – September 30, 1980) was a film actor during the period from the 1930s to the 1950s. In many of his early films he was a leading man; however, later in his career he played bit parts. McGuire appeared in Steamboat Round the Bend (1935); Charlie Chan at the Circus (1936);The Prisoner of Shark Island (1936); Stranger on the Third Floor (1940), sometimes thought Hollywood's first film noir; The Invisible Ghost (1941); Sands of Iwo Jima (1949); and Where the Sidewalk Ends (1950).

== Partial filmography ==
- Guns for Hire (1932) - Jim Thornton
- Strictly Dynamite (1934) - Radio Announcer (uncredited)
- Bright Eyes (1934) - Aviator and Mechanic (uncredited)
- Bachelor of Arts (1934) - Radical (uncredited)
- Outlaw Rule (1935) - Danny Taylor
- Dante's Inferno (1935) - Wireless Operator (uncredited)
- Steamboat Round the Bend (1935) - Duke
- This Is the Life (1935) - Michael Grant
- Your Uncle Dudley (1935) - Robert Kirby
- The Prisoner of Shark Island (1936) - Lt. Lovett
- Charlie Chan at the Circus (1936) - Hal Blake
- Human Cargo (1936) - 'Spike' Davis
- End of the Trail (1936) - Larry Pearson
- Wanted! Jane Turner (1936) - Jerry Turner
- Happy Go Lucky (1936) - Airplane Mechanic (uncredited)
- Fugitives for a Night (1938) - Casino Extra (uncredited)
- Women Without Names (1940) - Walter Ferris
- Stranger on the Third Floor (1940) - Michael Ward
- Street of Memories (1940) - Joe Mason / Richard Havens
- Invisible Ghost (1941) - Ralph Dickson / Paul Dickson
- Sea Raiders (1941, Serial) - Tom Adams
- Cadets on Parade (1942) - Man with Newspaper (uncredited)
- Sing Your Worries Away (1942) - Policeman Nolan (uncredited)
- Mexican Spitfire at Sea (1942) - First Officer Reynolds (uncredited)
- My Favorite Spy (1942) - Nightclub Patron (uncredited)
- Powder Town (1942) - Harvey Dodge
- The Mayor of 44th Street (1942) - Curley Sharp (uncredited)
- Mexican Spitfire Sees a Ghost (1942) - Luders
- The Magnificent Ambersons (1942) - Young Man (uncredited)
- Highways by Night (1942) - James 'Duke' Wellington
- The Navy Comes Through (1942) - James Bayless
- Shadow of a Doubt (1943) - Detective (uncredited)
- Dead of Night (1945) - Hugo Fitch (segment "The Ventriloquist's Dummy'") (uncredited)
- Bells of San Angelo (1947) - Rex Gridley
- River Lady (1948) - Collins (uncredited)
- The Strawberry Roan (1948) - Bud Williams
- Fighter Squadron (1948) - Major Duncan (uncredited)
- He Walked by Night (1948) - Officer Robert Rawlins (uncredited)
- Command Decision (1948) - Fly Control Officer (uncredited)
- Highway 13 (1948) - Joe (uncredited)
- Flamingo Road (1949) - Plainclothesman (uncredited)
- Sky Liner (1949) - George Eakins
- Task Force (1949) - Supply Officer (uncredited)
- White Heat (1949) - Psychiatrist #2 (uncredited)
- Fighting Man of the Plains (1949) - Travers' Secretary (uncredited)
- Border Incident (1949) - Norson - Immigration Officer (uncredited)
- Sands of Iwo Jima (1949) - Capt. Joyce
- The Lady Takes a Sailor (1949) - Coast Guard Officer (uncredited)
- Where the Sidewalk Ends (1950) - Major L.T. Moore (uncredited)
- Black Hand (1950) - Policeman (uncredited)
- Federal Agent at Large (1950) - Customs officer
- Rock Island Trail (1950) - Army Lieutenant (uncredited)
- Military Academy with That Tenth Avenue Gang (1950) - Lt. Waverley (uncredited)
- Where the Sidewalk Ends (1950) - Detective Gertessen (uncredited)
- To Please a Lady (1950) - Newark Referee (uncredited)
- Highway 301 (1950) - Police Sgt. Parker (uncredited)
- Call Me Mister (1951) - Military Police Lieutenant (uncredited)
- You're in the Navy Now (1951) - Naval Commander (uncredited)
- Fourteen Hours (1951) - Cop (uncredited)
- Up Front (1951) - MP Lieutenant (uncredited)
- The First Legion (1951) - Father Tom Rawleigh
- Never Trust a Gambler (1951) - State Trooper (uncredited)
- Secrets of Beauty (1951) - Asst. Director
- Force of Arms (1951) - Doctor (uncredited)
- The Strip (1951) - Deputy (uncredited)
- The Racket (1951) - Policeman in Locker Room (uncredited)
- The Tanks Are Coming (1951) - Col. Matthews
- The Sea Hornet (1951) - Policeman (uncredited)
