= Dorothy Lovett =

American actress (1915–1998)

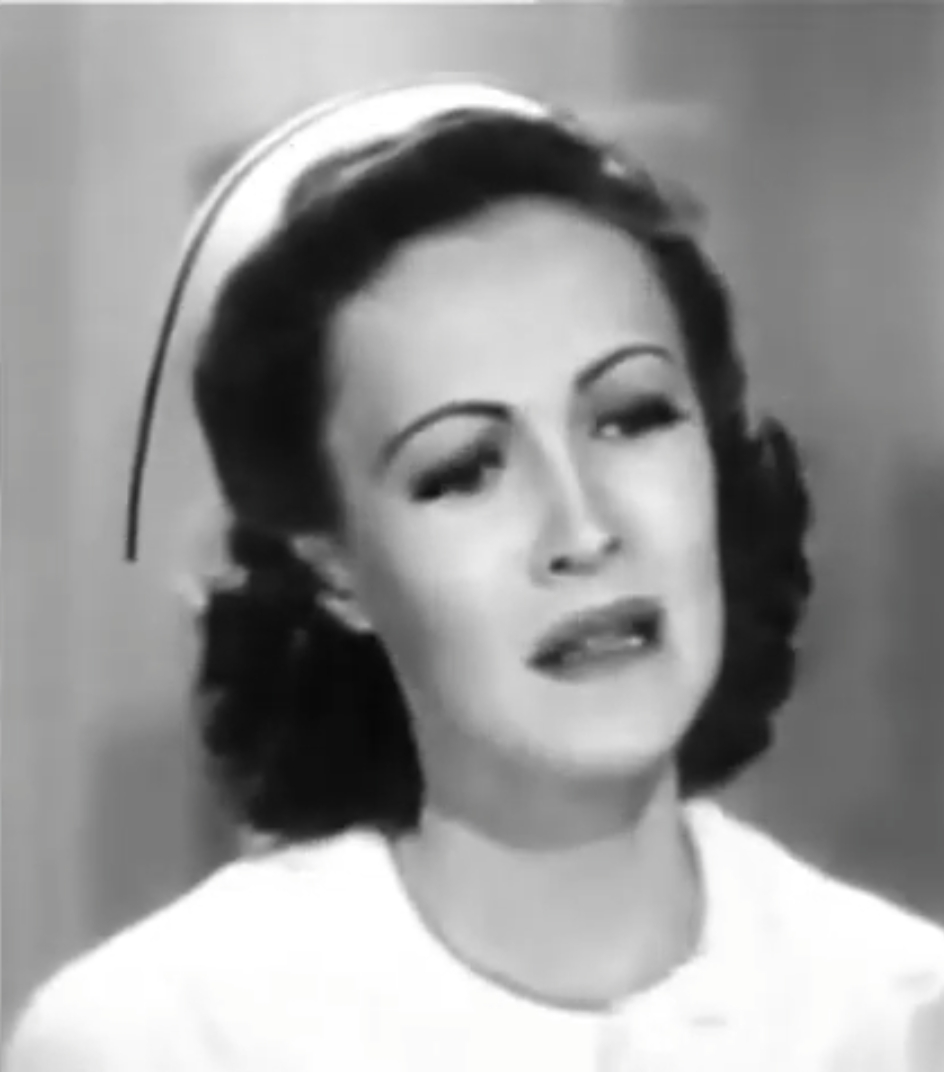
- Lovett in Meet Dr. Christian (1939)
- Born: February 16, 1915; Providence, Rhode Island, U.S.
- Died: April 28, 1998 (aged 83); Sherman Oaks, California, U.S.
- Education: Brown University (Pembroke College)
- Occupation: Actress
- Years active: 1939–1965
- Spouse: Jack Hively (m. 1941)

Dorothy Lovett (February 16, 1915 – April 28, 1998) was an American film actress.

== Early life ==
Lovett was born in Providence, Rhode Island. She had two brothers. She graduated from Pembroke College in Brown University with a major in sociology and a minor in psychology. She was a member of the school's Komians dramatic society and worked in summer theater during her college years.

== Career ==
=== Film ===
Lovett's film debut came in Twelve Crowded Hours (1939), when she spoke one word as a cigarette girl. Her best-known recurring role is that of Judy Price in Meet Dr. Christian (1939), Remedy for Riches (1940), The Courageous Dr. Christian (1940), Dr. Christian Meets the Women (1940) and They Meet Again (1941). She spent almost the whole of her career with RKO studios, debuting in 1939. She was lent to Universal Studios to make The Green Hornet Strikes Again and retired from professional life in 1943 when her RKO contract expired. She also appeared in Sing Your Worries Away (1942).

Her last film appearance was a small role in 1965's A Patch of Blue.

=== Radio ===
Lovett's early radio experience came on WPRO in Providence, where she performed on programs that included a cooking school, a dramatized serial, a shopping service, and a weekly fashion show.

In radio series, Lovett supplied the voices for Toni Sherwood on Rocky Jordan (1945-1947), Meta Bauer/Jan Carter on Guiding Light (1948-1949) and Grace Adam on The Seeking Heart (1953-1955). She also appeared on Dr. Christian, Lux Radio Theatre, Father Knows Best and many other radio programs.

=== Modeling ===
After Lovett went to New York in 1937 she became a model after her auditions brought little success. Her work for the Modeling Bureau included posing for automobile advertisements and food companies.

=== TV ===
In 1954, Lovett began portraying Grace Adam, a doctor's wife, in The Seeking Heart, a CBS daytime drama.

== Personal life and death ==
Lovett married director Jack Hively in Dayton, Ohio, on December 25, 1941, while he was in the Air Force. Hively worked for RKO studios for a period. They met when he directed the film They Made Her a Spy in which she appeared. She died in Sherman Oaks, California.

== Filmography ==
Year	Title	Role	Notes
1939	Meet Dr. Christian	Judy Price	Theatrical film
1940	Remedy for Riches	Judy Price	Theatrical film
1940	The Courageous Dr. Christian	Judy Price	Theatrical film
1940	Dr. Christian Meets the Women	Judy Price	Theatrical film
1940	The Green Hornet Strikes Again!	Frances Grayson/Stella Merja	Theatrical film
1941	Lucky Devils	Norma	Theatrical film
1941	They Meet Again	Judy Price	Theatrical film
1941	Look Who's Laughing	Marge	Theatrical film
1942	Call Out the Marines	Mary	Theatrical film
1942	Sing Your Worries Away	Carol Brewster	Theatrical film
1942	Powder Town	Sally Dean	Theatrical film
1943	The Mantrap	Jane Mason	Theatrical film
1960	Why Must I Die?	Mrs. Benson	Theatrical film
1965	A Patch of Blue	Woman (uncredited)	Theatrical film
