= Jean Hersholt =

Danish-American actor (1886–1956)

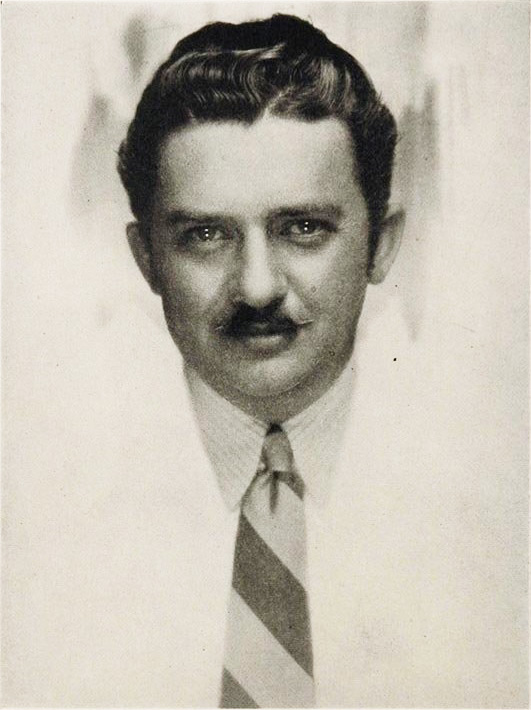
- Hersholt in 1929
- Born: Jean Pierre Carl Buron; 12 July 1886; Copenhagen, Denmark
- Died: 2 June 1956 (aged 69); Los Angeles, California, U.S.
- Resting place: Forest Lawn Memorial Park, Glendale, California
- Other names: Jean Pierre Hersholt; Jean Buron Hersholt
- Occupations: Actor; philanthropist; humanitarian; literary editor; translator
- Years active: 1906–1955
- Spouse: Via Hersholt (m. 1914)
- Children: 1 son

Jean Pierre Carl Buron (12 July 1886 – 2 June 1956), known professionally as Jean Hersholt, was a Danish-American actor. He is most famous for starring on the CBS radio series Dr. Christian from 1937–1954, reprising the role in a film series from 1939-1941. He also co-starred with Shirley Temple in the film Heidi (1937). When asked how to pronounce his name, he told The Literary Digest, "in English her'sholt; in Danish, hairs'hult." From 1924 to 1955, he had 140 motion picture credits: 75 silent film and 65 "talkies"; he directed four.

== Early life ==
Hersholt was born Jean Pierre Carl Buron on 12 July 1886 in Copenhagen, the capital of Denmark. He claimed to have been born into a family of actors, but in reality, both of his parents, Henri Pierre Buron and Clara (née Petersen), were hairdressers. Henri was the son of a French Roman Catholic father and a Danish Protestant mother, while Clara was the daughter of a Danish Protestant father and a Danish Jewish mother. Initially, Henri worked as a hairdresser but later became a cigar and wine merchant/vendor. Hersholt appeared in two of the first short films of the Danish film studio Nordisk Film in 1906, but did not find much success in his early years in Denmark. Hersholt emigrated to the United States in 1913 and spent the remainder of his acting career in America.

== Career ==
Promotional flyer for 'The Vaseline Program' / and 'Dr. Christian' radio drama program with Jean Hersholt broadcasting 1937-1954 on the Columbia Broadcasting System (CBS) radio network and station KIRO in Seattle, Washington

Hersholt is best remembered for his roles in two iconic films. In 1924, he played Marcus Schouler in the silent film classic Greed directed by Erich von Stroheim. A decade later, he co-starred with world-famous child actress Shirley Temple as her beloved grandfather living in the remote Alps in the 1937 film version of the classic 1880 children's book, Heidi, written by Swiss author Johanna Spyri. Throughout his extensive film career, he portrayed a wide range of characters, from villains in early silent films to supporting roles where his gentle Danish language accent and pleasant voice made him well-suited to portray a succession of benevolent fathers, doctors, professors, and European noblemen. Hersholt's final on-screen appearance was in the 1955 movie Run for Cover.

In the 1936 movie The Country Doctor, starring the famous Dionne quintuplets, Hersholt portrayed Dr. John Luke, a character based on Dr. Allan Roy Dafoe, the Canadian obstetrician who delivered and cared for the Dionne quintuplets. Two sequels followed the movie. Hersholt wanted to portray the role on radio but could not obtain the rights. He chose to create his own doctor character for radio. Since he was a fan of fairy tale anthology author Hans Christian Andersen, he borrowed that name for his character portrayal. This character, "Dr. Paul Christian," was a philosophical doctor who practiced in the typical Midwestern town of River's End. He received assistance from Nurse Judy Price and occasionally from others. On 7 November 1937, Dr. Christian debuted on the Columbia Broadcasting System (CBS) radio network as part of the 'Vaseline Program' opening with the theme music, "Rainbow on the River."

The small-town physician's good humor, innate common sense, and scientific training helped drive off a series of villainous types attempting to disrupt the peaceful lifestyle of River's End. The radio series, produced by Dorothy McCann, became a popular and long-running hit. It aired on the CBS network for 17 years until 6 January 1954. Hersholt was so strongly associated with the role that he received mail asking for real-life medical advice. The Dr. Christian series spawned several spin-offs, making it one of the earliest media franchises. For example, Hersholt co-wrote a Dr. Christian novel and starred in a series of six family feature films as Dr. Christian in a franchise spanning two years, from 1939 to 1941. An example of one of these films is Dr. Christian Meets the Women released in 1940.

In 1956, two years after the long-running radio program concluded, the character Dr. Christian made the transition to television and its unique programming style. The script for this new television program was written by a young Gene Roddenberry, who would later become famous for creating the original TV series 'Star Trek' in 1966. This led to the renowned science fiction franchise over the next few decades. The new 'Dr. Christian' TV show differed from the radio series by introducing a new, younger character portrayed by Macdonald Carey as the elder Christian's nephew, "Dr. Mark Christian". The show was syndicated through CBS and its production company, Ziv Television, and ran for two seasons from 1956-1957. It was mostly broadcast at non-traditional times on local stations nationwide, after Jean Hersholt's death in early 1956.

From the late 1930s through the mid-1950s, Neil Reagan, the brother of actor and future U.S. president Ronald Reagan, worked as a traveling industry spokesman for the General Electric Company. Additionally, Neil directed the earlier CBS radio series Dr. Christian, with Jean Hersholt.

In 1939, Hersholt broadened his social interests and played a critical role in establishing the Motion Picture Relief Fund, now known as the Motion Picture and Television Fund. This fund provides medical care and support for Hollywood industry employees at various levels, offering assistance when experiencing difficulties due to illness, old age, or other challenges. This occurred just four years after the establishment of America's "social safety net" with the passage of Social Security old age pension system by the Roosevelt administration. The fund Hersholt supported was used to establish the Motion Picture Country House and Hospital in Woodland Hills, California. After his death in 1956, his philanthropic endeavors led to the establishment of the Jean Hersholt Humanitarian Award. This honorary Academy Award, also known as the "Oscar," is presented to an "individual in the motion picture industry whose humanitarian efforts have brought credit to the industry." The fund was later expanded to include those working in the television field.

As president of the Academy of Motion Picture Arts and Sciences, Hersholt was actively involved in various activities to promote and preserve American cinema. On March 20, 1948, during the 20th anniversary of the academy's founding, he presented special awards to several pioneers of the American motion pictures/film industry. The recipients included Colonel William N. Selig, Albert E. Smith, George K. Spoor, and Thomas Armat. These individuals were often referred to as "the Men Who Invented Hollywood".

Hersholt's extensive collection of books and other materials by the famous Danish author Hans Christian Andersen is now housed in the special collections division of the Library of Congress in Washington, D.C.. He translated over 160 of Andersen's fairy tales into English. These were published in 1949 in six volumes as The Complete Andersen, this work is "... rated as The standard translation, being one of the best" in English cited by the Hans Christian Andersen Center of the University of Southern Denmark.

Hersholt was appointed a knight of the Danish Order of the Dannebrog and awarded a medal in 1948, partly due to this literary academic endeavor.

On August 31, 1952, the accomplished elder Hersholt appeared as the mystery guest on the popular long-running CBS-TV panel/quiz show What's My Line? less than four years before his death. The show aired from the 1950s and into the 1960s and was hosted by John Charles Daly.

== Family ==
Hersholt married Via Andersen on 11 April 1914. They had one son, Allan Hersholt.

He was the paternal half-uncle (by marriage) of actor Leslie Nielsen and former Canadian Deputy Prime Minister Erik Nielsen.

== Death ==
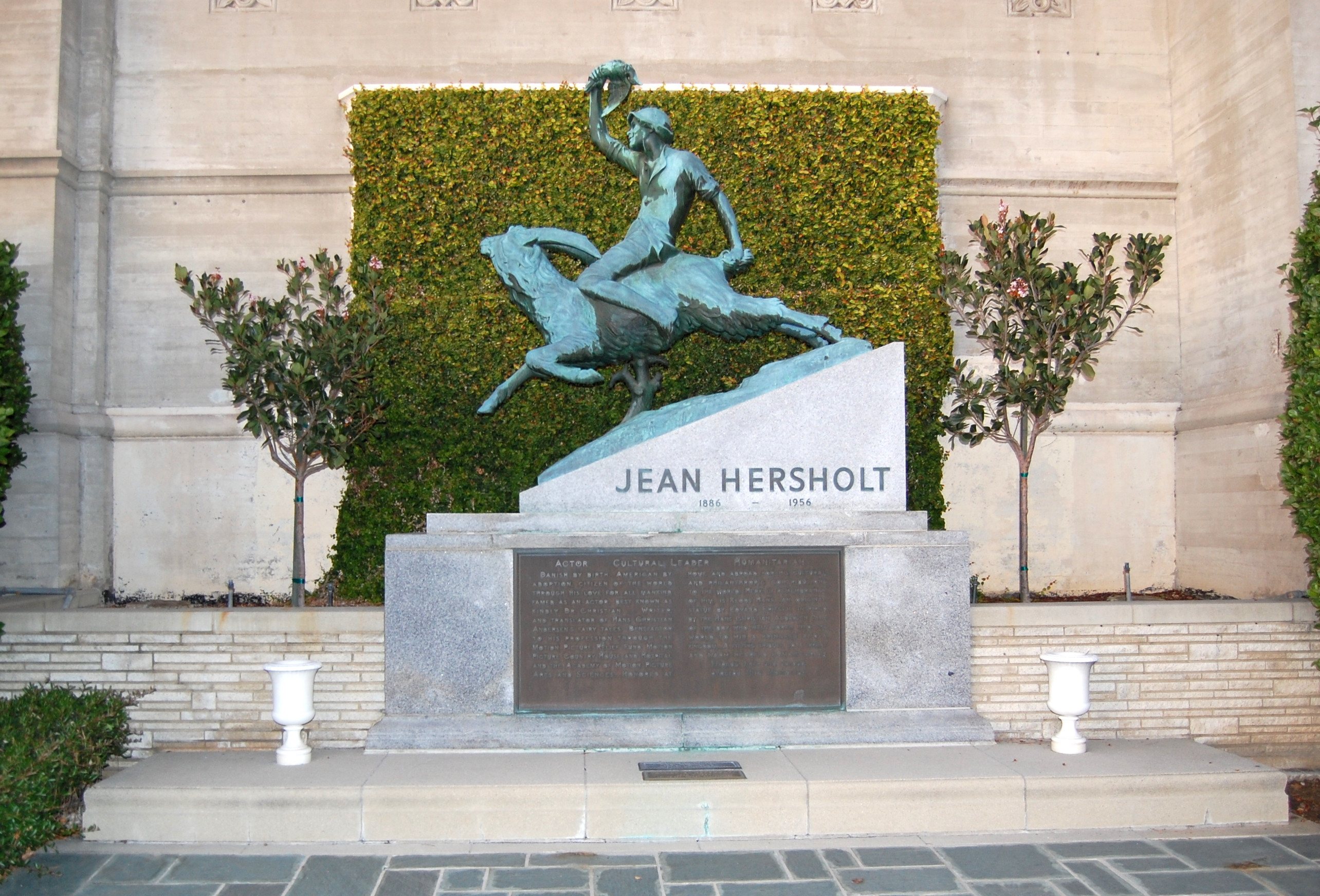
Jean Hersholt's grave at Forest Lawn Memorial Park Cemetery in Glendale, California

Hersholt died of cancer in Hollywood on the night of 2 June 1956. He is interred in Forest Lawn Memorial Park Cemetery in Glendale, California. His grave is marked with a statue of Klods-Hans (English: Clumsy Hans), a Hans Christian Andersen character who left home to find his way in the world — much as Hersholt himself had done.

== Honors and awards ==
Hersholt was honored with honorary Academy Awards for his services to the industry in 1940, 1949, and 1950. In his honor, the Jean Hersholt Humanitarian Award was named by the Academy of Motion Picture Arts and Sciences. He is one of only 11 people with two stars on the Hollywood Walk of Fame. One is located at 6501 Hollywood Boulevard for his work in motion pictures, and another one is located at 6701 Hollywood Boulevard for his work in radio.

== Selected filmography ==
Year	Film	Role	Director	Notes
1915	The Disciple	Mob Member		uncredited
1916	Bullets and Brown Eyes			
1916	Hell's Hinges	Bartender		uncredited
1916	The Aryan		Reginald Barker and Clifford Smith	
1916	Kinkaid, Gambler			
1916	The Desert			
1917	Black Orchids		Rex Ingram	
1917	Fighting for Love	Ferdinand	Raymond Wells	
1917	Love Aflame	Reginald	Raymond Wells	
1917	The Terror	Jimm, the Dope	Raymond Wells	
1917	The Saintly Sinner			
1917	Perils of the Secret Service	Prince Feodor		serial; episode #2
1917	Southern Justice	Caleb Talbot	Lynn Reynolds	
1917	The Greater Law		Lynn Reynolds	
1917	The Soul Herder	The Parson	John Ford	Short
1917	The Show Down	Parkes	Lynn Reynolds	
1917	A Stormy Knight	Dr. Fraser	Elmer Clifton	
1917	'49-'17	'Gentleman Jim' Raynor		
1917	Princess Virtue	Emile Carre	Robert Z. Leonard	
1918	Madame Spy	Count Von Ornstorff	Douglas Gerrard	
1918	The Answer	Shepard		
1918	Little Red Decides		Jack Conway	
1919	Whom the Gods Would Destroy			
1919	Love's Prisoner	Party Guest	John Francis Dillion	uncredited
1920	The Red Lane	Vetal Beaulieu		
1920	Merely Mary Ann	Stranger	Edward J. Le Saint	
1920	The Golden Trail	Harry Teal	Lewis H. Moomaw	
1920	The Deceiver			
1921	The Servant in the House	Manson, The Servant in the House	Jack Conway	
1921	The Four Horsemen of the Apocalypse	Professor von Hartrott	Rex Ingram	uncredited
1921	A Certain Rich Man	Adrian Brownwell	Howard Hickman	
1921	The Man of the Forest	Lem Beasley	Howard Hickman	
1922	When Romance Rides	Joel Creech	Jean Hersholt	
1922	Heart's Haven	Henry Bird	Benjamin B. Hampton	
1922	Tess of the Storm Country	Ben Letts	John S. Robertson	
1922	The Strangers' Banquet	Fiend	Marshall Neilan	
1923	Jazzmania	Prince Otto of Como	Robert Z. Leonard	
1923	Quicksands	Ring Member	Jack Conway	
1923	Red Lights	Ezra Carson	Clarence G. Badger	
1923	Souls for Sale	Himself	Rupert Hughes	
1924	Torment	Boris	Scott R. Beal (assistant director)	
1924	The Goldfish	Herman Krauss	Jerome Storm	
1924	The Woman on the Jury	Jury Foreman	Harry O. Hoyt	
1924	Sinners in Silk	Dr. Eustace	Hobart Henley	
1924	Her Night of Romance	Joe Diamond	Sidney Franklin	
1924	Greed	Marcus	Erich von Stroheim	
1924	Cheap Kisses	Gustaf Borgstrom	Cullen Tate	
1924	So Big	Aug Hempel	Charles Brabin	
1925	Dangerous Innocence	Gilchrist	William A. Seiter	
1925	Fifth Avenue Models	a Crook	Svend Gade	
1925	If Marriage Fails	Dr. Mallini	John Ince	
1925	Don Q, Son of Zorro	Don Fabrique	Donald Crisp	
1925	A Woman's Faith	Jules Cluny	Edward Laemmle	
1925	Stella Dallas	Ed Munn	Henry King	
1926	The Greater Glory	Gustav Schmidt	Curt Rehfeld	
1926	My Old Dutch	'Erb 'Uggins	Laurence Trimble	
1926	It Must Be Love	Pop Schmidt	Alfred E. Green	
1926	Flames	Ole Bergson	Lewis H. Moomaw	
1926	The Old Soak	Clement Hawley, Sr.	Edward Sloman	
1927	The Wrong Mr. Wright	Seymour White	Scott Sidney	
1927	Alias the Deacon	George Caswell, aka The Deacon	Edward Sloman	
1927	The Student Prince in Old Heidelberg	Dr. Jüttner	Ernst Lubitsch	
1928	13 Washington Square	'Deacon' Pyecroft	Melville W. Brown	
1928	The Secret Hour	Tony	Rowland V. Lee	
1928	Abie's Irish Rose	Solomon Levy	Victor Fleming	
1928	Jazz Mad	Franz Hausmann	F. Harmon Weight	
1928	The Battle of the Sexes	William Judson	D. W. Griffith	
1928	Give and Take	Factory Owner	William Beaudine	
1929	Girl on the Barge	McCadden	Edward Sloman	
1929	The Younger Generation	Pa	Frank Capra	
1929	Modern Love	François Renault	Arch Heath	
1930	The Climax	Luigi Golfanti	Renaud Hoffman	
1930	The Case of Sergeant Grischa	Posnanski	Ray Lissner (assistant)	
1930	Mamba	August Bolte	Albert S. Rogell	Mamba
1930	Hell Harbor	Joseph Horngold	Henry King	
1930	East Is West	Man	Monta Bell	
1930	A Soldier's Plaything	Grandfather Rittner	Michael Curtiz	uncredited
1930	The Cat Creeps	Dr. Patterson	Rupert Julian	
1930	The Third Alarm	Frank 'Dad' Morton	Emory Johnson	
1930	Viennese Nights	Elsa's Father	Alan Crosland	
1931	Daybreak	Herr Schnabel	Jacques Feyder	
1931	Transatlantic	Rudolph aka Jed Kramer	William K. Howard	
1931	The Phantom of Paris	Herman	John S. Robertson	
1931	Susan Lenox (Her Fall and Rise)	Karl Ohlin	Robert Z. Leonard	
1931	The Sin of Madelon Claudet	Dr. Dulac	Edgar Selwyn	
1931	Private Lives	Oscar	Sidney Franklin	
1932	Emma	Mr. Frederick Smith	Clarence Brown	
1932	The Beast of the City	Sam Belmonte	Charles Brabin	
1932	Are You Listening?	George Wagner		
1932	Grand Hotel	Senf, the Porter	Edmund Goulding	
1932	Night Court	the Janitor	W. S. Van Dyke	
1932	New Morals for Old	James Hallett	Charles Brabin	
1932	Unashamed	Heinrich Schmidt	Harry Beaumont	
1932	Skyscraper Souls	Jake Sorenson	Edgar Selwyn	
1932	Hearts of Humanity	Sol Bloom	Christy Cabanne	
1932	The Mask of Fu Manchu	Von Berg	Charles Vidor	
1932	Flesh	Mr. Herman	John Ford	
1933	The Crime of the Century	Dr. Emil Brandt	William Beaudine	
1933	Song of the Eagle	Otto Hoffman	Ralph Murphy	
1933	Dinner at Eight	Jo Stengel	George Cukor	
1933	Christopher Bean	Rosen	Sam Wood	
1934	The Cat and the Fiddle	Professor	Sam Wood (uncredited)	
1934	Men in White	Dr. 'Hockie' Hochberg	Ryszard Bolesławski	
1934	The Fountain	Baron Van Leyden	John Cromwell	
1934	The Painted Veil	Herr Koerber	Richard Boleslawski	
1935	Mark of the Vampire	Baron Otto	Tod Browning	
1935	Break of Hearts	Professor Thalma	Philip Moeller	
1935	Murder in the Fleet	Victor Hanson	Edward Sedgwick	
1936	Tough Guy	Veterinarian	Chester Franklin	
1936	The Country Doctor	Dr. John Luke	Henry King	
1936	Sins of Man	Christopher Freyman	Gregory Ratoff	
1936	His Brother's Wife	Professor Fahrenheim	W. S. Van Dyke	
1936	Reunion	Dr. John Luke		
1936	One in a Million	Heinrich Muller	Sidney Lanfield	
1937	Seventh Heaven	Father Chevillon	Henry King	
1937	Heidi	Adolph Kramer / Grandfather	Allan Dwan	
1938	Happy Landing	Herr Lars Ericksen	Roy Del Ruth	
1938	Alexander's Ragtime Band	Professor Heinrich	Henry King	
1938	I'll Give a Million	Victor	Walter Lang	
1938	Five of a Kind	Dr. John Luke	Herbert I. Leeds	
1939	Mr. Moto in Danger Island	Sutter	Herbert I. Leeds	
1939	Meet Dr. Christian	Dr. Paul Christian	Bernard Vorhaus	
1940	The Courageous Dr. Christian	Dr. Paul Christian	Bernard Vorhaus	
1940	Dr. Christian Meets the Women	Dr. Paul Christian	William C. McGann	
1940	Remedy for Riches	Dr. Paul Christian	Erle C. Kenton	
1941	Melody for Three	Dr. Paul Christian	Erle C. Kenton	
1941	They Meet Again	Dr. Paul Christian	Erle C. Kenton	
1943	Stage Door Canteen	Himself	Frank Borzage	
1949	Dancing in the Dark	Jean Hersholt	Irving Reis	
1955	Run for Cover	Mr. Swenson	Nicholas Ray	

== Radio appearances ==
Year	Program	Episode/source
1943	Lady Esther Screen Guild Theatre	Men in White

Non-profit organization positions
Preceded by Walter Wanger	President of Academy of Motion Pictures, Arts and Sciences; 1945–1949	Succeeded by Charles Brackett
