= They Meet Again =

1941 film by Erle C. Kenton

- Directed by: Erle C. Kenton
- Written by: Peter Milne (story); Peter Milne (screenplay) and Maurice Leo (screenplay)
- Produced by: William Stephens
- Starring: Jean Hersholt; Dorothy Lovett; Robert Baldwin
- Cinematography: Frank Redman
- Edited by: Alex Troffey
- Music by: C. Bakaleinikoff
- Distributed by: RKO Radio Pictures
- Release date: July 11, 1941
- Running time: 69 minutes
- Country: United States
- Language: English

They Meet Again is a 1941 American drama film directed by Erle C. Kenton and starring Jean Hersholt, Dorothy Lovett, and Robert Baldwin. It is one of the series of six Dr. Christian films released by RKO Pictures.

== Plot ==
Dr. Paul Christian is giving a party for Janie Webster, a motherless little girl of nine, with a fine singing voice. But, as her father, Bob Webster, is about to leave the bank where he works to go to the celebration, a shortage is found in his books. for which he is held responsible, jailed, and subsequently, in a court trial is found guilty.

== Cast ==
- Jean Hersholt as Dr. Paul Christian
- Dorothy Lovett as Judy Price
- Robert Baldwin as Roy Davis
- Maude Eburne as Mrs. Hastings
- Neil Hamilton as Governor John C. North
- Anne Bennett as Janie Webster
- Barton Yarborough as Bob Webster
- Arthur Hoyt as Redmond, Governor's Secretary
- John Dilson as William Merrill Sr.
- Frank Melton as William Merrill Jr.
- Leon Tyler as Dick
- Milton Kibbee as Defense Attorney Larkin
- Gus Glassmire as Judge Ed Ellis
- Patsy Parsons as Susie
- Meredith Howard as Gertrude

== Soundtrack ==
- Anne Bennett - "When Love Is New" (Lyrics by Jack Owens, music by Claude Sweeten)
- Anne Bennett - "In the Make Believe Land of Dreams" (Written by Jack Owens)
- Patsy Parsons - "Get Alive" (Written by Jack Owens)
- Leon Tyler - "The Rhythm Is Red an' White an' Blue" (Lyrics by David Gregory, music by Al Moss)
- Anne Bennett - "Au Forse E Lut" (aria from La Traviata) (Written by Giuseppe Verdi)

== Bibliography ==
- Fetrow, Alan G. Feature Films, 1940-1949: a United States Filmography. McFarland, 1994.
