= The Courageous Dr. Christian =

1940 film

- Directed by: Bernard Vorhaus
- Written by: Ring Lardner Jr. Ian McLellan Hunter
- Produced by: Monroe Shaff (associate producer); William Stephens (producer)
- Starring: Jean Hersholt; Dorothy Lovett; Robert Baldwin
- Cinematography: John Alton
- Edited by: Edward Mann
- Music by: William Lava
- Production company: Stephens-Lang Productions
- Distributed by: RKO Pictures
- Release date: 5 April 1940
- Running time: 67 minutes
- Country: United States
- Language: English

The Courageous Dr. Christian is a 1940 American drama film directed by Bernard Vorhaus. The film is the second entry in the film series about Dr. Christian.

== Plot summary ==
Kindhearted Dr. Paul Christian appalled by the harsh living conditions of homeless inhabitants of Squatterstown. He lets one of the homeless—Dave Williams—live with him, and goes on to ask the city to build housing for the poor. He realizes that it is the powerful Mrs. Norma Stewart who has the last say in the matter since it is her property they would build on.

Mrs. Stewart has long been in love with Dr. Christian, and sends her two wards Jack and Ruth Williams to him, with the deed and a letter stating the condition under which she would donate the property to the city, which is that the good doctor agree to marry her. However, the message is not delivered, since the children lose the letter, and the doctor receives only the deed.

Too late does the doctor realize the price he must pay for the property, and the city also backs out of their agreement to build housing for the poor and homeless. The result is that the homeless have nowhere to go, and have to move into another vacant lot with no proper housing.

Before the police can remove the unwanted new tenants, an epidemic of spinal meningitis spreads in the area, and Dr. Christian puts the whole area under quarantine. The city inhabitants become aware of the horrible conditions of the homeless and soon voices raise to build public housing.

The story ends with Dr. Christian released from his contract with Mrs. Stewart, as she gets more involved with raising her wards. Homeless Dave is overjoyed with all the sympathy shown by the city's inhabitants and starts to believe in a brighter future after all.

== Cast ==
- Jean Hersholt as Dr. Paul Christian
- Dorothy Lovett as Judy Price
- Robert Baldwin as Roy Davis
- Tom Neal as Dave Williams
- Maude Eburne as Mrs. Hastings
- Vera Lewis as Mrs. Norma Stewart
- George Meader as Harry Johnson
- Bobby Larson as Jack Williams
- Bobette Bentley as Ruth Williams
- Reginald Barlow as Sam
- Jacqueline De River as Martha
- Edmund Glover as Tommy Wood
- Mary Davenport as Jane Wood
- Earle Ross as Grandpa
- Sylvia Andrew as Mrs. Sam
- Catherine Courtney as Mrs. Morris
- Al Bridge as Sheriff
- James C. Morton as Bailey
- Fred Holmes as Wilson
- Frank LaRue as Stanley
- Budd Buster as Jones
- Broderick O'Farrell as Harris
