= Sky Liner (film) =

- Directed by: William Berke (as Wm. Berke)
- Screenplay by: Maurice Tombragel
- Produced by: William Stephens (as Wm. Stephens)
- Starring: Richard Travis; Pamela Blake; Rochelle Hudson
- Cinematography: Carl Berger
- Edited by: Edward Mann
- Music by: Raoul Kraushaar
- Production company: Lippert Pictures
- Distributed by: Screen Guild Productions
- Release date: July 28, 1949
- Running time: 61 minutes 49 minutes (DVD)
- Country: United States
- Language: English

Sky Liner is a 1949 American film noir action crime film directed by William Berke. It was released on the bottom half of double bills.

== Plot ==
The film follows a selection of passengers on a long distance overnight flight on a silver Lockheed Constellation with Trans World Airlines, through a series of vignettes looking at the passengers and crew. Characters range from a precocious child star (intended to echo Shirley Temple) to businessmen and criminals.

An FBI man (Richard Travis) and a stewardess (Pamela Blake) solve a spy murder on the crowded airliner after a dead man is found in the lavatory. All passengers are suspects. They discover the victim has been stabbed by a fountain pen containing Curare poison.

== Cast ==
- Richard Travis as Steve Blair
- Pamela Blake as Carol
- Rochelle Hudson as Amy Winthrop
- Steven Geray as Bokejian
- Gaylord Pendleton as Smith
- Ralph Peters as Joe Kirk
- Michael Whalen as Ben Howard
- Greg McClure as J. S. Conningsby
- Lisa Ferraday as Mariette La Fare
- Roy Butler as Mr. Jennings
- Jean Clark as Mrs. Jennings
- David Holt as Buford
- Dodie Holt as Grace Ward
- William F. Leicester as Captain Fairchild – Pilot (as Wm. Leicester)
- Ezelle Poule as Elvin's Sister
- Herbert Evans as Sir Harry Finneston
- Alice Ritchie as Elvia's
- Jeanne Sorel as Brunet Stewardess (as Jean Sorel)
- Anne Lu Jones as Airline Ticket Agent
- Jack Mulhall as Col. Hanson
- Allan Hersholt as Courier (as Alan Hersholt)
- John McGuire as George Eakins
- George Meeker as Financier
- Anna Mae Slaughter as Mary Ann

== Production ==
Filming started 25 April 1949 at Hal Roach's studios. It was described as "a kind of Grand Hotel of an airliner."

It was made by the same writing-directing-producing team that had done Highway 13.
