= Meet Dr. Christian =

1939 film

- Directed by: Bernard Vorhaus
- Written by: Harvey Gates (story); Ian McLellan Hunter (writer); Ring Lardner Jr. (writer)
- Produced by: Monroe Shaff (associate producer); William Stephens (producer)
- Starring: Jean Hersholt; Dorothy Lovett; Robert Baldwin
- Cinematography: Robert Pittack; John Alton
- Edited by: Edward Mann
- Music by: Joseph Nussbaum
- Distributed by: RKO Radio Pictures
- Release date: November 17, 1939
- Running time: 68 minutes
- Country: United States
- Language: English

Meet Dr. Christian is a 1939 American drama film directed by Bernard Vorhaus and starring Jean Hersholt, Dorothy Lovett and Robert Baldwin. It was the first of six films in the Dr. Christian series, based on the radio series in which Hersholt also starred.

== Cast ==
- Jean Hersholt as Dr. Paul Christian
- Dorothy Lovett as Nurse Judy Price
- Robert Baldwin as Roy Davis
- Enid Bennett as Anne Hewitt
- Paul Harvey as Mayor John Hewitt
- Marcia Mae Jones as Marilee
- Jackie Moran as Don Hewitt
- Maude Eburne as Mrs. Hastings
- Frank Coghlan Jr. as Bud
- Patsy Parsons as Patsy Hewitt
- Sarah Edwards as Mrs. Minnows
- John Kelly as Jim Cass
- Eddie Acuff as Joe Benson
