= Invisible Ghost =

1941 film by Joseph H. Lewis

- Film poster
- Directed by: Joseph H. Lewis
- Screenplay by: Al Martin; Helen Martin
- Story by: Al Martin; Helen Martin
- Produced by: Sam Katzman
- Starring: Bela Lugosi; Polly Ann Young; John McGuire; Clarence Muse
- Cinematography: Marcel Le Picard; Harvey Gould
- Edited by: Robert Golden
- Production company: Banner Pictures Corp.
- Distributed by: Monogram Pictures Corp.
- Release date: April 25, 1941
- Running time: 64 minutes
- Country: United States
- Language: English

Invisible Ghost is a 1941 American horror film directed by Joseph H. Lewis, produced by Sam Katzman and starring Bela Lugosi.

== Plot ==
The home of Charles Kessler is beset by a series of unsolved murders. Kessler, who lives with his daughter and servants since his wife left him, is shown to be the murderer, unbeknownst to himself. His wife, who became brain-damaged in a car accident not long after leaving him, has been visiting the grounds of the house and the sight of her through his window puts Kessler into a trance-like state which makes him homicidal. Ralph Dickson, the fiancée of Kessler's daughter, is convicted and executed for one of the murders. His twin brother Paul arrives and, through a series of events, including Kessler's wife finally entering the house and being seen by others, Kessler is seen to go into the trance and the mystery is revealed.

== Cast ==
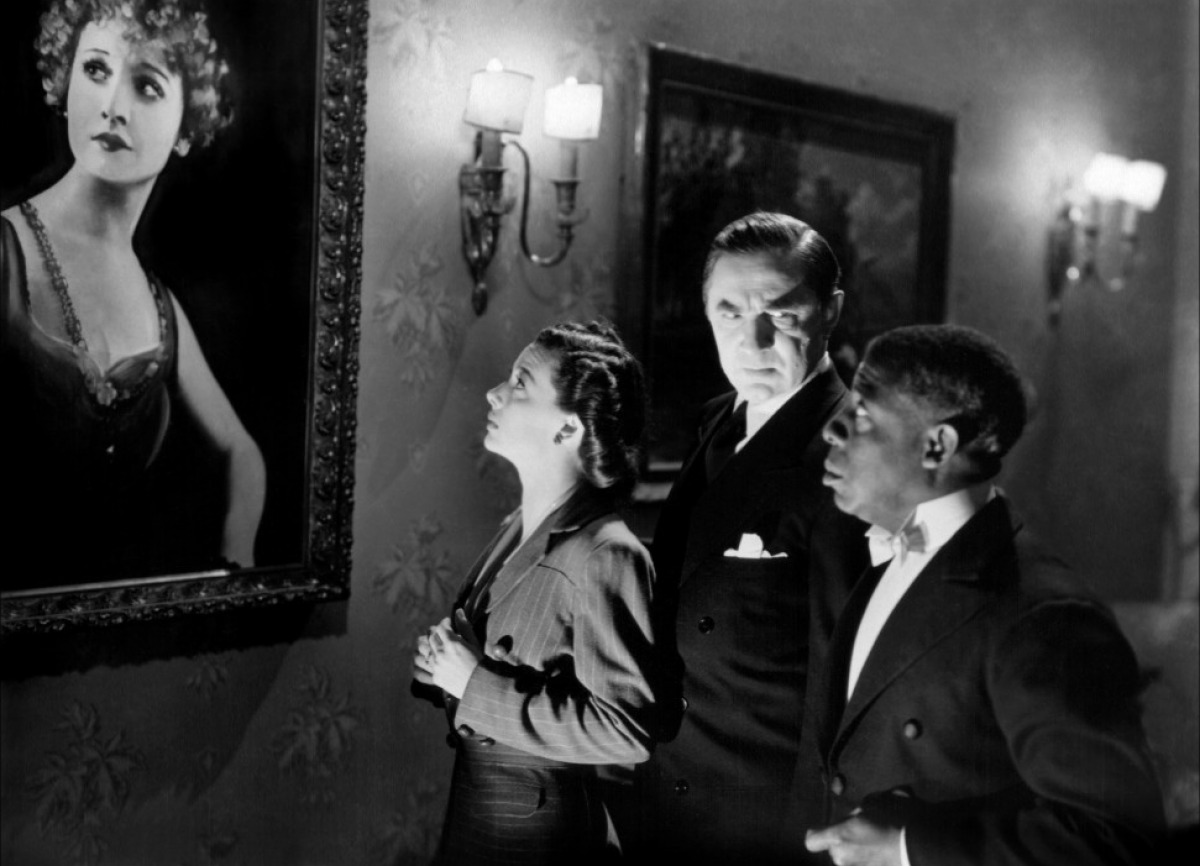
L. to R.: Polly Ann Young, Bela Lugosi, and Clarence Muse in Invisible Ghost – cropped screenshot

- Bela Lugosi as Dr. Charles Kessler
- Polly Ann Young as Virginia Kessler
- John McGuire as Ralph Dickson and Paul Dickson
- Clarence Muse as Evans the Butler
- Terry Walker as Cecile Mannix
- Betty Compson as Mrs. Kessler
- Ernie Adams as Jules Mason
- George Pembroke as Police Lieutenant Williams
- Ottola Nesmith as Mrs. Mason (as Ollola Nesmith)
- Fred Kelsey as Detective Ryan
- Jack Mulhall as Detective Tim

== Production ==
The film was initially announced in press as Murder by the Stars, and later re-titled The Phantom Killer. Actor Bela Lugosi began his regular work for Monogram Pictures, starting with Invisible Ghost. Lugosi had previously worked with the company in the 1930s with The Mysterious Mr. Wong (1934) and the British film they distributed The Dark Eyes of London. Lugosi was set as the lead in the film, a month in advance than the films supporting players where were signed on a day before production began shooting on March 20, 1941.

Among the crew of the film was Al Martin, who had been working in film since the silent film era, mostly writing subtitles for films. He only wrote a few genre pictures, including The Rogues' Tavern (1936), Trapped by Television (1936), The Mad Doctor of Market Street (1942) and Invasion of the Saucer Men (1957). The films producer, Sam Katzman produced several low-budget features and was described in 1999 by film historian Tom Weaver as predominantly being known for his horror and science fiction film productions decades later. Both photographers Marcel Le Picard and Harvey Gould are credited in the films credits, with only Le Picard receiving credit in the film's pressbook.

== Release ==
Invisible Ghost was released on April 25, 1941. The film was released on blu-ray in March 2017.

== Reception ==
From contemporary reviews, Weaver described Invisible Ghost's as getting the "reviews it deserved." The Motion Picture Exhibitor described the film as "complicated and unbelievable" while the New York Post gave the film a "Fair" rating, noting a complex plot and the "buildup of suspense in a horror/drama, is imperfect." The New York Daily News gave the film a one star rating, declaring the film to be a "ghastly bore" finding that Lugosi was "not at his best" and the direction of Joseph H. Lewis was "inadequate". The Los Angeles Times said the film was "head and shoulders above the average horror picture. Its superiority is based on the fact that spine-tickling qualities stem from a psychopathic and psychological situation rather than a purely physical one, imparting a Poe-ish flavour... Lugosi is, of course, superb in his work, being master of all the horror tricks but never overdoing them".

From retrospective reviews, Leonard Maltin's Film Guide awarded two out of a possible four stars, calling it "Better written and directed than most of Bela's 1940s cheapies, but still a far-cry from Dracula".

== See also ==
- Bela Lugosi filmography
- List of films in the public domain in the United States
