= Doughnuts and Society =

1936 film by Lewis D. Collins

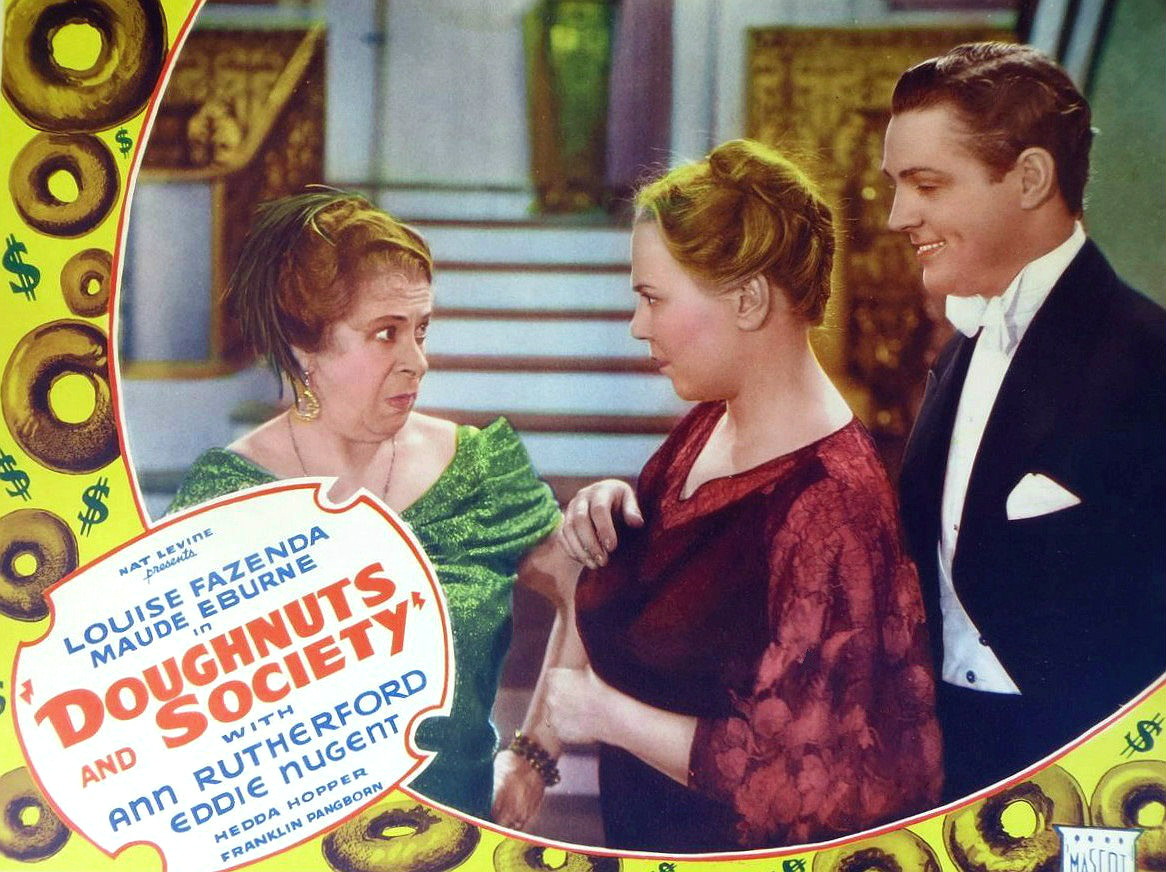
- Lobby card
- Directed by: Lewis D. Collins
- Screenplay by: Karen DeWolf; Robert St. Claire; Wallace MacDonald; Matt Brooks; Gertrude Orr
- Story by: Karen DeWolf; Robert St. Claire; Wallace MacDonald
- Produced by: Nat Levine
- Starring: Louise Fazenda; Maude Eburne; Ann Rutherford; Edward Nugent; Hedda Hopper; Franklin Pangborn
- Cinematography: William Nobles
- Edited by: Arthur A. Brooks
- Production company: Mascot Pictures
- Distributed by: Republic Pictures
- Release date: March 27, 1936
- Running time: 63 minutes
- Country: United States
- Language: English

Doughnuts and Society is a 1936 American comedy film directed by Lewis D. Collins and written by Karen DeWolf, Robert St. Claire, Wallace MacDonald, Matt Brooks and Gertrude Orr. The film stars Louise Fazenda, Maude Eburne, Ann Rutherford, Edward Nugent, Hedda Hopper and Franklin Pangborn. The film was released on March 27, 1936, by Republic Pictures.

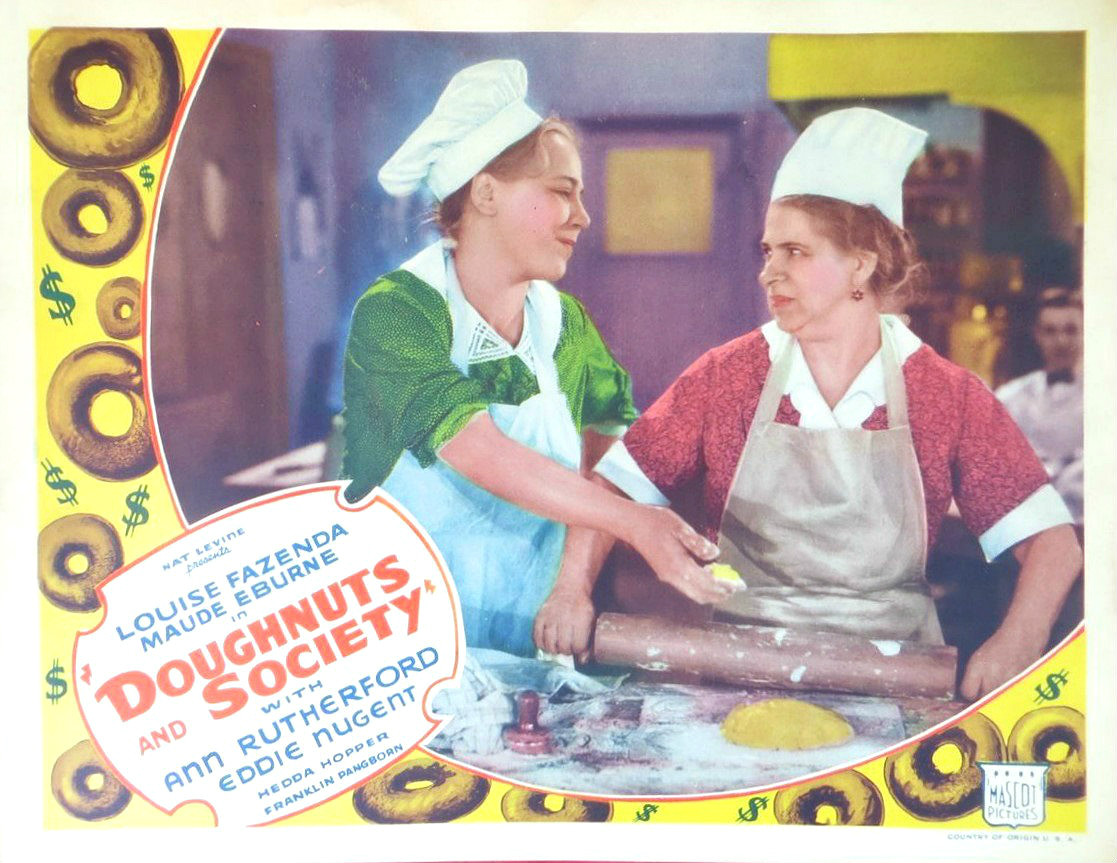
Louise Fazenda (left) and Maude Eburne

== Plot ==
Belle Dugan and Kate Flanagan are partners in a doughnut business. When Belle gets $50,000 to sell her mine to a mining company for potential gold, she is brought into society and wealth with her daughter Joan. She leaves Kate behind with her son Jerry behind at the doughnut business. Although they left on bad terms, Belle invites Kate and Jerry to a party at their new mansion, all while Kate wears uncomfortable shoes. When she sits to take them off, a dog snatches them, and she embarrasses herself in front of everyone at the party. Belle kicks her out, and Joan and Jerry leave on bad terms, in defense of their mothers. That same night, Jerry has a brilliant money-making idea: a parking garage.

They make a cake as a diorama and they start their garage business, as well as get into society and wealth just like Belle and Joan. This time, however, Kate has the party and invites Belle and Joan to HER mansion. Again, they leave on bad terms, as well as Joan and Jerry. Soon, Kate and Jerry sell the company because they were sabotaged by a businessman whose offer to buy out the business was rejected. As a result, they were forced to sell the company to another businessman. Now they are out of wealth and back to the doughnuts when all of a sudden, just before Joan is to marry a Frenchman, the same woman that came and gave Belle the $50,000 for her mine comes and tells her they didn't find any gold, just water. Now, Joan and Jerry get married and Belle and Kate are back where they started, at the doughnut business!

== Cast ==
- Louise Fazenda as Kate Flannagan
- Maude Eburne as Belle Dugan
- Ann Rutherford as Joan Dugan
- Edward Nugent as Jerry Flannagan
- Hedda Hopper as Mrs. Murray Hill
- Franklin Pangborn as Benson
- Rafael Storm as Ivan Petroff
- Harold Minjir as Hoyt
- Olaf Hytten as Wellington
- Robert Light as Bill
- Isabelle Keith as Miss Bradley
- Smiley Burnette as Mover #2
