= No Greater Sin =

1941 film

- Directed by: William Nigh
- Written by: Mary C. Ransone; Michael Jacoby
- Produced by: Jeffrey Bernerd
- Starring: Leon Ames; Luana Walters; Pamela Blake
- Cinematography: Harry Neumann
- Edited by: Robert Golden
- Music by: Edward J. Kay
- Production company: University Films Productions
- Distributed by: University Films Productions
- Release date: August 28, 1941
- Running time: 85 minutes
- Country: United States
- Language: English

No Greater Sin is a 1941 American drama film directed by William Nigh and starring Leon Ames, Luana Walters. and Pamela Blake. It was released a few months before America's entry into World War II.

== Synopsis ==
A local health commissioner tries to stop the spread of syphilis in an American town.

== Cast ==
- Leon Ames as Dr. Edward Cavanaugh
- Luana Walters as Sandra James
- Pamela Blake as Betty James
- Malcolm "Bud" McTaggart as Bill Thorne
- Guy Usher as J.J. "Pa" James
- Bodil Rosing as "Ma" James
- John Gallaudet as Townsend
- Henry Roquemore as Mayor
- Frank Jaquet as Dr. Henry Hobson
- Tristram Coffin as Maj. Raleigh
- Lee Shumway as J.C. Jarvis
- William Gould as District Attorney Benton
- J. Arthur Young as Judge Prescott
- Claudia Drake as Flo
- Jessie Arnold as Miss Calhoun, Dr. Hobson's Nurse
- Ralf Harolde as Nick Scaturo
- Isabel La Mal as Mrs. Richards
- Frances Morris as Jarvis's Secretary
- Jack Cheatham as Policeman
- Wilbur Mack as University President

== Production ==
No Greater Sin was an attempt to capitalize on the success of the Warner Bros. feature Dr. Ehrlich's Magic Bullet (1940), recounting the pioneering treatment of venereal disease. Edward A. Golden, former publicity man turned independent film producer, made No Greater Sin at Monogram Pictures, using Monogram's actors, technicians, and studio facilities. Golden would later produce the biggest exploitation success of the 1940s, Hitler's Children, released by RKO in 1943.

== Bibliography ==
- Fetrow, Alan G. Feature Films, 1940-1949: a United States Filmography. McFarland, 1994.
- Schaefer, Eric. "Bold! Daring! Shocking! True!": A History of Exploitation Films, 1919-1959. Duke University Press, 1999.
