= This Is the Life (1935 film) =

1935 film by Marshall Neilan

- Theatrical release poster
- Directed by: Marshall Neilan
- Screenplay by: Lamar Trotti; Arthur T. Horman
- Story by: C. Graham Baker; Gene Towne; Sid Brod; Lou Breslow
- Produced by: Sol M. Wurtzel
- Starring: Jane Withers; John McGuire; Sally Blane; Sidney Toler; Francis Ford
- Cinematography: Daniel B. Clark
- Edited by: Fred Allen
- Music by: David Buttolph
- Production company: Fox Film Corporation
- Distributed by: 20th Century Fox
- Release date: October 18, 1935
- Running time: 63 minutes
- Country: United States
- Language: English

This Is the Life is a 1935 American comedy film directed by Marshall Neilan and written by Lamar Trotti and Arthur T. Horman. The film stars Jane Withers, John McGuire, Sally Blane, Sidney Toler, Gloria Roy and Gordon Westcott. The film was released on October 18, 1935, by 20th Century Fox.

== Cast ==
- Jane Withers as Geraldine 'Jerry' Revier
- John McGuire as Michael Grant
- Sally Blane as Helen Davis
- Sidney Toler as Professor Lafcadio F. Breckenridge
- Gloria Roy as Diane Revier
- Gordon Westcott as Ed Revier
- Francis Ford as 'Sticky' Jones
- Emma Dunn as Mrs. Davis

== Critical reception ==
Variety wrote "pathos, sympathetic appeal and some amusing comedy touches combine to make this release palatable." They wrote that the film was built around the talents of its star, Jane Withers, and that she sang and danced well and played one of the most "natural parts any child performer has been given on the screen. A sort of female Jackie Cooper." John McGuire and Sidney Toler were also acknowledged for the quality of their performances.
