= Wyoming Outlaw =

1939 film

- Theatrical poster
- Directed by: George Sherman
- Screenplay by: Jack Natteford; Betty Burbridge
- Based on: Based on characters by William Colt MacDonald
- Produced by: William A. Berke
- Starring: John Wayne; Ray Corrigan; Raymond Hatton
- Cinematography: Reggie Lanning
- Edited by: Tony Martinelli
- Music by: William Lava
- Distributed by: Republic Pictures
- Release date: June 27, 1939
- Running time: 56 minutes
- Country: United States
- Language: English

Wyoming Outlaw is a 1939 American "Three Mesquiteers" Western film directed by George Sherman and starring John Wayne, Ray Corrigan, and Raymond Hatton. Wayne played the lead in eight of the fifty-one films in the series.

== Plot ==
Set during the Great Depression in the American Dust Bowl, Wyoming Outlaw follows the struggles of Will Parker, a young man trying to support his impoverished family in the face of economic hardship and political corruption. Will's father, Mr. Parker, is a former road crew foreman who was fired for refusing to collect forced political contributions from his workers for the corrupt local boss, Joe Balsinger. Now destitute and unable to receive relief due to owning worthless dust-blown land, the Parkers survive on what little they can scrounge.

After a dust storm ravages the plains, Will is caught illegally killing a steer to feed his family. Rather than arrest him, three cowhands—Stony Brooke, Rusty Joslin, and Lullaby Joslin, collectively known as the Three Mesquiteers—sympathize with his situation and offer him a job driving cattle to a national park. However, Will's past offense against the game laws catches up with him when a park warden denies him entry. Rather than jeopardize their permit, the Mesquiteers reluctantly let Will go.

As Will wanders, he is pursued by Balsinger's enforcers, who are determined to suppress any dissent in their tightly controlled town. Will's family continues to suffer; Mr. Parker is beaten by Balsinger's thugs to prevent him from testifying before a government committee investigating corruption. Meanwhile, the Mesquiteers head to the state capital to report the wrongdoing. Will, now hunted, is accused of murdering two men and becomes the target of a posse with orders to shoot on sight.

Taking refuge in the hills, Will is eventually cornered but refuses to surrender. Despite efforts by the Mesquiteers and his sister Irene to reach him and convince him to give himself up peacefully, Will is too embittered and distrustful. In a dramatic confrontation, Will captures Balsinger and prepares to turn him over to the authorities. But as he emerges to deliver justice, he is fatally shot by deputies unaware of his intent.

The film ends with Balsinger exposed and the townspeople finally confronting the corruption that has ruled their lives. Will's tragic death underscores the moral complexity of justice, as he is both outlaw and martyr—driven to crime not by vice, but by desperation and systemic injustice.

== Cast ==
- John Wayne as Stony Brooke
- Ray "Crash" Corrigan as Tucson Smith
- Raymond Hatton as Rusty Joslin
- Don 'Red' Barry as Will Parker
- Pamela Blake (as Adele Pearce) as Irene Parker
- LeRoy Mason as Joe Balsinger
- Charles Middleton as Luke Parker
- Katherine Kenworthy as Mrs. Parker
- Elmo Lincoln as U.S. Marshal Gregg
- Jack Ingram as Sheriff Nolan
- David Sharpe as Newt
- Jack Kenney as Amos Doyle
- Yakima Canutt as Henchman Ed Sims

== See also ==
- John Wayne filmography
