= The Hat Box Mystery =

1947 film

- Directed by: Lambert Hillyer
- Written by: Carl K. Hittleman; Maury Nunes
- Produced by: Robert L. Lippert; Carl K. Hittleman; Maury Nunes
- Starring: Tom Neal; Pamela Blake; Allen Jenkins
- Cinematography: James S. Brown Jr.
- Edited by: Arthur A. Brooks
- Music by: Darrell Calker
- Production company: Screen Art Pictures
- Distributed by: Screen Guild Productions; Exclusive Films (UK)
- Release date: June 12, 1947
- Running time: 44 minutes
- Country: United States
- Language: English

The Hat Box Mystery is a 1947 mystery short film directed by Lambert Hillyer and starring Tom Neal, Pamela Blake and Allen Jenkins. It was produced as a featurette for release by Robert L. Lippert's Screen Guild Productions. It was shot at the General Service Studios in Hollywood. The film's sets were designed by the art director William Glasgow. A sequel The Case of the Babysitter, was released the following month.

== Synopsis ==
Susan Hart, the secretary and fiancée of private detective Russ Ashton takes a case in his absence. Given a hat box by her client with a hidden camera inside she is told to take a photograph of his wife so he can begin divorce proceedings. Instead when she opens the box the woman is shot dead and she finds herself accused of murder.

== Cast ==
- Tom Neal as Russ Ashton
- Pamela Blake as Susan Hart
- Allen Jenkins as 'Harvard'
- Virginia Sale as Veronica Hoopler
- Leonard Penn as Stevens
- Olga Andre as Marie Moreland
- Tom Kennedy as Police Officer Murphy
- Al Hill as Flint
- Edward Keane as District Attorney
- Zon Murray as Joe
- Bob Nunes as Witness
- Jack Cheatham as Policeman

== Bibliography ==
- Pitts, Michael R. Famous Movie Detectives II. Scarecrow Press, 1991.
