= A Royal Romance (1930 film) =

1930 film

- Pauline Starke and William Collier
- Directed by: Erle C. Kenton
- Written by: Norman Houston
- Produced by: Harry Cohn
- Starring: William Collier; Pauline Starke; Clarence Muse
- Cinematography: Ted Tetzlaff
- Edited by: Gene Havlick
- Production company: Columbia Pictures
- Distributed by: Columbia Pictures
- Release date: March 17, 1930
- Running time: 66 minutes
- Country: United States
- Language: English

A Royal Romance is a 1930 American Pre-Code romantic comedy film directed by Erle C. Kenton and starring William Collier, Pauline Starke and Clarence Muse. It was an unofficial remake of the 1925 silent film A Fool and His Money.

== Cast ==
- William Collier as John Hale
- Pauline Starke as Countess von Baden
- Clarence Muse as Rusty
- Ann Brody as Frau Muller
- Eugenie Besserer as Mother
- Walter P. Lewis as Hans
- Betty Boyd as Mitzi
- Ullrich Haupt as Count von Baden
- Bert Sprotte as Magistrate
- Dorothy DeBorba as Gloria

== Bibliography ==
- Parish, James Robert. Ghosts and angels in Hollywood films: plots, critiques, casts, and credits for 264 theatrical and made-for-television releases. McFarland, 1994.
