= A Fool and His Money (1925 film) =

1925 film directed by Erle C. Kenton

- Directed by: Erle C. Kenton
- Written by: Vincent Lawrence; Frank Davis; Douglas Z. Doty (adaptation)
- Based on: A Fool and His Money by George Barr McCutcheon
- Starring: Madge Bellamy; William Haines
- Distributed by: Columbia Pictures
- Release date: January 1, 1925
- Running time: 56 minutes
- Country: United States
- Language: Silent (English intertitles)

A Fool and His Money is a lost 1925 American silent romantic drama film starring William Haines and Madge Bellamy and is based on a novel by George Barr McCutcheon. The film was directed by Erle C. Kenton and was filmed before in 1920. That version starred Eugene O'Brien and Rubye De Remer.

It was remade as the sound film A Royal Romance in 1930.
