= The Unknown Guest (1943 film) =

1943 film directed by Kurt Neumann

- Directed by: Kurt Neumann
- Written by: Philip Yordan
- Produced by: Charles King; Maurice King
- Starring: Victor Jory; Pamela Blake; Veda Ann Borg
- Cinematography: Jackson Rose
- Edited by: Martin G. Cohn
- Music by: Dimitri Tiomkin
- Production company: King Brothers Productions
- Distributed by: Monogram Pictures
- Release date: October 22, 1943
- Running time: 61 minutes
- Country: United States
- Language: English

The Unknown Guest is a 1943 American mystery film released by King Brothers Productions. It was written by Philip Yordan, directed by Kurt Neumann and stars Victor Jory, Pamela Blake and Veda Ann Borg.

== Cast ==
- Victor Jory as Charles "Chuck" Williams
- Pamela Blake as Julie
- Veda Ann Borg as Helen Walker
- Harry Hayden as George Nadroy
- Paul Fix as Fain
- Emory Parnell as Sheriff Dave Larsen
- Ray Walker as Swarthy
- Lee 'Lasses' White as Joe Williams
- Nora Cecil as Martha Williams
- Eddie Mills as Sidney

== Production ==
Philip Yordan had written a script for brothers Charles and Maurice King titled Dillinger, but the Kings suggested that Yordan write something less expensive to produce. Yordan took a course in budgeting from production manager George Moskov. Yordan later recalled:

Moskov’s advice was to avoid a gangster film. Action and gunfire was costly. He suggested a suspense melodrama with one set. I dreamed up an imitation Hitchcock idea, all taking place in a roadhouse closed for the winter. Frank King liked the script, especially the low cost with very few extras. He couldn’t pay more than the minimum and had to cajole and flatter the actors to get them. The brothers managed to get Victor Jory and Pamela Drake for almost nothing.

== Reception ==
The film was the first from Monogram to screen at Grauman's Chinese Theatre.
