= Street of Memories =

- Theatrical release poster
- Directed by: Shepard Traube
- Screenplay by: Robert Lees; Frederic I. Rinaldo
- Produced by: Lucien Hubbard
- Starring: Lynne Roberts; Guy Kibbee; John McGuire; Edward Gargan; Hobart Cavanaugh; Jerome Cowan
- Cinematography: Charles G. Clarke
- Edited by: Nick DeMaggio
- Music by: David Buttolph
- Production company: 20th Century Fox
- Distributed by: 20th Century Fox
- Release date: November 15, 1940
- Running time: 71 minutes
- Country: United States
- Language: English

Street of Memories is a 1940 American drama film directed by Shepard Traube (1907–1983), written by Robert Lees and Frederic I. Rinaldo, and starring Lynne Roberts, Guy Kibbee, John McGuire, Edward Gargan, Hobart Cavanaugh and Jerome Cowan. It was released on November 15, 1940, by 20th Century Fox.

== Plot ==
Joe Manson has amnesia and gets in trouble quite often, however Catherine sees something in Joe and they end up getting married. After that, Joe gets into a fight and remembers being the son of a rich man from Chicago, unfortunately that's the only thing he remembers.

== Cast ==
- Lynne Roberts as Catherine (Kitty) Foster
- Guy Kibbee as Harry Brent
- John McGuire as Joe Mason / Richard Havens
- Edward Gargan as Mike Sullivan
- Hobart Cavanaugh as Mr. Foster
- Jerome Cowan as Mr. Gower
- Charles Waldron as Richard Havens
- Sterling Holloway as Student Barber
- Scotty Beckett as Tommy Foster
- Adele Horner as Mary Ann Foster
- Pierre Watkin as Dr. Thornton
