= Melody for Three =

1941 film by Erle C. Kenton

- Directed by: Erle C. Kenton
- Written by: Walter Ferris; Lee Loeb
- Produced by: William Stephens
- Starring: Jean Hersholt; Fay Wray; Walter Woolf King
- Cinematography: John Alton
- Edited by: Edward Mann
- Music by: Constantin Bakaleinikoff
- Production company: Stephens-Lang Productions
- Distributed by: RKO Pictures
- Release date: March 28, 1941 (United States)
- Running time: 67 minutes
- Country: United States
- Language: English

Melody for Three is a 1941 American drama film directed by Erle C. Kenton and starring Jean Hersholt, Fay Wray and Astrid Allwyn. It was produced by RKO Pictures and is one of the six films of the Dr. Christian series.

== Plot ==
Dr. Christian takes an interest in a young boy, a violin prodigy, whose mother is a divorced music teacher. His interest isn't just in the boy's music career—he believes it would be best for the boy to have his parents back together, and sets out to do just that.

== Cast ==
- Jean Hersholt as Dr. Paul Christian
- Fay Wray as Mary Stanley
- Walter Woolf King as Antoine Pirelle
- Astrid Allwyn as Gladys McClelland
- Schuyler Standish as Billy Stanley
- Maude Eburne as Mrs. Hastings
- Andrew Tombes as Mickey Delany
- Toscha Seidel as Violinist
- Hank Mann as Man at musical (uncredited)
- Elvia Allman As Radio Station Receptionist (uncredited)
