= William Stephens (producer) =

American film producer

William Stephens (1897–1962) was an American film producer.

In the late 1940s he made a number of films for Robert L. Lippert. He also worked with Kroger Babb.

== Select credits ==
- Meet Dr. Christian (1939) – producer
- The Courageous Dr. Christian (1940) – producer
- Dr. Christian Meets the Women (1940) -producer
- Remedy for Riches (1940) – producer
- Melody for Three (1941) – producer
- They Meet Again (1941) – producer
- The Return of Rin Tin Tin (1947) – producer
- Jungle Goddess (1948) – producer
- Thunder in the Pines (1948) – producer
- Highway 13 (1948) – producer
- Arson, Inc (1949) – producer
- Sky Liner (1949) – producer
- Deputy Marshal (1949) – producer
- Once a Thief (1950) – associate producer
- One Too Many (1950) – associate producer
- The Bogus Green (1951) (TV) – production supervisor
- Secrets of Beauty (1951) – production supervisor
- China Smith (1952) (TV series) – production supervisor
- Schlitz Playhouse (1952) (TV series) – production supervisor
- The Loretta Young Show (1953) – production manager
- Appointment in Hondouras (1953) -production supervisor
- Police Call (1954) – production supervisor
- Witness to Murder (1954) – production supervisor
- The Steel Cage (1954) – production supervisor
- Men Behind Bars (1954) – supervising producer
- Tumbleweed: Baron of Purgatory (1959) (TV series) – production supervisor
