= Pamela Blake =

American actress (1915–2009)

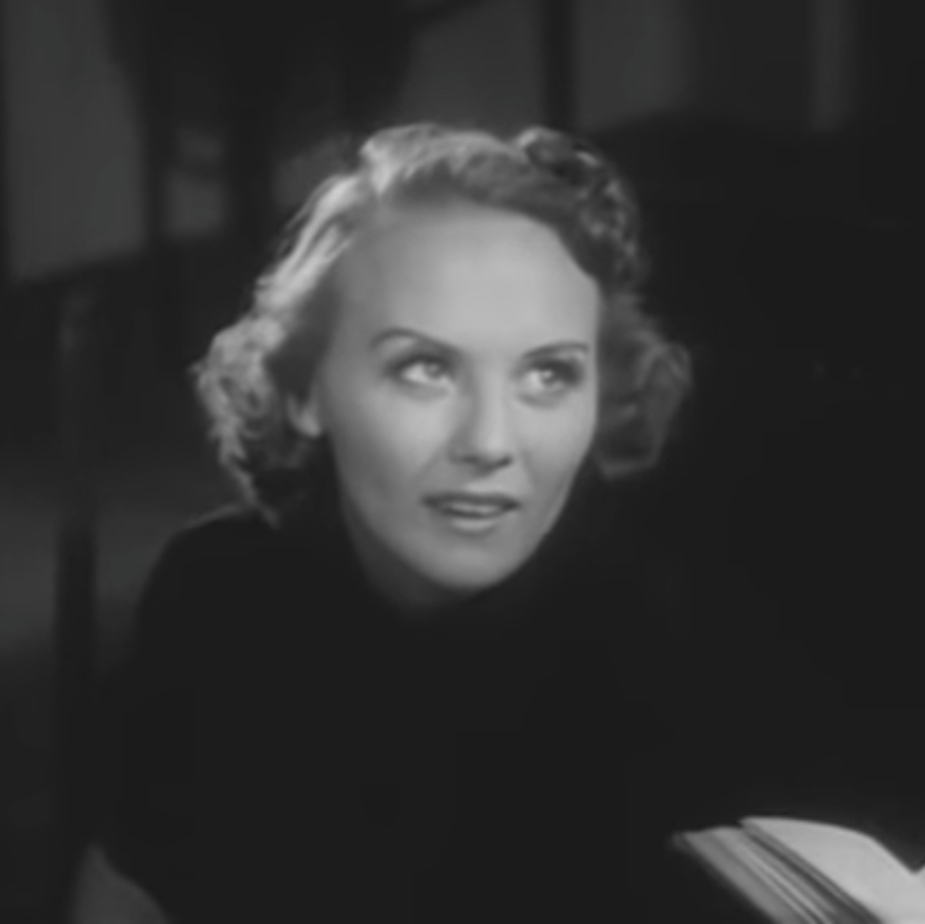
- Blake in The Utah Trail (1938)
- Born: Adele Pearce; August 6, 1915; Oakland, California, U.S.
- Died: October 6, 2009 (aged 94); Las Vegas, Nevada, U.S.
- Occupation: Actress
- Years active: 1934–1954
- Spouses: Malcolm 'Bud' McTaggart (m. 1936; div. 1940) Mike Stokey (m. 1943; div. 1948) John Canavan (m. 1983; died 1996)
- Children: 2

Pamela Blake (August 6, 1915 – October 6, 2009) was an American film actress who acted in almost 50 films. She is known primarily for her roles in Western films and serials.

== Early years ==
Blake was born in Oakland, California as Adele Pearce, and performed under that name until 1942. Following her mother's death when Blake was 3 years old, she went to live with an uncle and aunt, William Bojorques and Gertrude Biddle-Bojorques in Petaluma, California. Her secondary education came at schools in Petaluma and San Francisco.

She went to Hollywood at age 17 after she won a beauty contest.

== Film ==
Blake's film career lasted for around 20 years, with her starring mostly in B-movies. Her first film role was uncredited, playing a bit part in the 1934 film Eight Girls on a Boat. However, in 1938 she starred in the Western The Utah Trail alongside Tex Ritter. ("It was terrible!" she said in later years. "I never saw it and never wanted to.") She also starred opposite John Wayne in the 1939 film Wyoming Outlaw. This helped her to secure several other Western acting roles, many times as the lead heroine. A major break came when she was cast as the second female lead in This Gun for Hire (1942).

In 1939 she starred in five films, one of which was a crime drama, one a mystery, and one a Western. In total she had roles in some 54 films, as well as a number of starring roles in certain television series. In 1946 she starred in Chick Carter, Detective. Toward the end of her career, she mostly played parts in Western genre films and television episodes, such as The Range Rider.

Waco (1952) was Blake's last feature film, and her last role was in the 1954 television pilot, The Adventures of the Texas Kid: Border Ambush, which was later released as a film.

== Personal life and death ==
In 1935, Blake was injured in an automobile wreck that might have ended her career. A newspaper article in The Petaluma Argus-Courier in 1940 described her as having emerged from the wrecked car "with a neck badly torn and both eyes and cheeks badly mutilated." Plastic surgery helped her to return to acting.

Blake married three times. In 1936, she eloped to Yuma, Arizona, with actor Malcolm "Bud" Taggert. They divorced in 1940. Her second marriage, in 1943, was to actor, television producer and writer Mike Stokey; it ended in divorce in 1948. They had one son, Mike Stokey II, and a daughter, Barbara. Their son served as a 1st Marine Division combat correspondent during the Vietnam War, and who then began working in the film industry as a military technical advisor, having worked with, among others, Steven Spielberg and Tom Hanks.

In 1953, Blake moved to Las Vegas, Nevada, to retire and raise her two children. She married John Canavan, an Air Force master sergeant, in 1983. Blake died of natural causes in a Las Vegas, Nevada care facility in 2009, at age 94.

== Filmography ==
Year	Title	Role	Notes
1934	Eight Girls in a Boat	School Girl	Uncredited
1934	Autumn Crocus	Lenchen	
1936	One in a Million	Dancer	Uncredited
1937	Stage Door	Actress	Uncredited
1938	Island in the Sky	Hatcheck Girl	Uncredited
1938	The Utah Trail	Sally Jeffers	
1939	Sorority House	Merle Scott	
1939	Wyoming Outlaw	Irene Parker	
1939	Girl from Rio	Annette Templeton	
1939	Full Confession	Laura Mahoney	
1939	Three Sons	Mamie Donaldson	
1940	Married and in Love	Minor Role	(scenes deleted)
1940	Millionaire Playboy	Eleanor	
1940	Pop Always Pays	Edna Brewster	
1940	One Crowded Night	Ruth	
1940	Men Against the Sky	Nurse	Uncredited
1940	Too Many Girls	Coed	Uncredited
1941	Mr. & Mrs. Smith	Lily	
1941	No Greater Sin	Betty James later Betty Thorne	
1942	This Gun for Hire	Annie	
1942	Maisie Gets Her Man	Elsie	
1942	The Omaha Trail	Julie Santley	
1942	Dr. Gillespie's New Assistant	Jimmy James	Uncredited
1943	Kid Dynamite	Ivy McGinnis	
1943	Slightly Dangerous	Mitzi	
1943	Swing Shift Maisie	Billie	
1943	The Unknown Guest	Julie	
1943	Swing Fever	Lois	
1945	Three's a Crowd	Diane Whipple	
1945	Why Girls Leave Home	Diana Leslie	
1945	Captain Tugboat Annie	Marion Graves	
1946	Live Wires	Mary Mahoney	
1946	Partners in Time	Elizabeth Meadows	
1946	Mysterious Intruder	Elora Lund	
1946	The Runaround	Coffee Shop Waitress	Uncredited
1946	Chick Carter, Detective	Ellen Dale	Serial
1946	The Mysterious Mr. M	Shirley Clinton	
1946	Rolling Home	Pamela Crawford	
1947	The Sea Hound	Ann Whitney	Serial
1947	The Hat Box Mystery	Susan Hart	
1948	Stage Struck	Janet Winters	
1948	Son of God's Country	Cathy Thornton	
1948	Highway 13	Doris Lacy	
1949	Ghost of Zorro	Rita White	
1949	Sky Liner	Carol, TWA Stewardess	
1950	Joe Palooka Meets Humphrey	Anne Howe Palooka	
1950	The Daltons' Women	Joan Talbot	
1950	Federal Man	Mrs. Judith Palmer	
1950	Gunfire	Cynthy	
1950	Border Rangers	Ellen Reed	
1951	Danger Zone	Vicki Jason	(2nd episode)
1952	Waco	Kathy Clark	
1954	Adventures of the Texas Kid: Border Ambush	Betty Johnson	
