= Remedy for Riches =

1940 film

- Directed by: Erle C. Kenton
- Written by: Lee Loeb
- Produced by: William Stephens
- Starring: Jean Hersholt; Dorothy Lovett; Edgar Kennedy
- Cinematography: John Alton
- Edited by: Paul Weatherwax
- Distributed by: RKO Radio Pictures
- Release date: November 29, 1940
- Running time: 60 minutes
- Country: United States
- Language: English

Remedy for Riches is a 1940 American comedy film directed by Erle C. Kenton and featuring Jean Hersholt. It is the fourth of the six films of the Dr. Christian series.

== Plot ==
A college friend of the local soda-jerk comes to town and lets it be known that he's looking for property on which to build a resort. When he buys some land and suddenly "discovers" there's oil underneath it—and generously offers to sell the townspeople shares in his newly found oil reserves—Dr. Christian suspects a swindle and sets out to prove it.

== Cast ==
- Jean Hersholt as Dr. Paul Christian
- Dorothy Lovett as Judy Price
- Edgar Kennedy as George Browning
- Maude Eburne as Mrs. Hastings
- Walter Catlett as Clem
- Robert Baldwin as Roy Davis
- Warren Hull as Tom Stewart
- Jed Prouty as D.B. Emerson Vanderveer
- Renie Riano as Mrs. Gattle
- Lester Scharff as Eddie
