= Dr. Christian =

American radio and TV medical drama

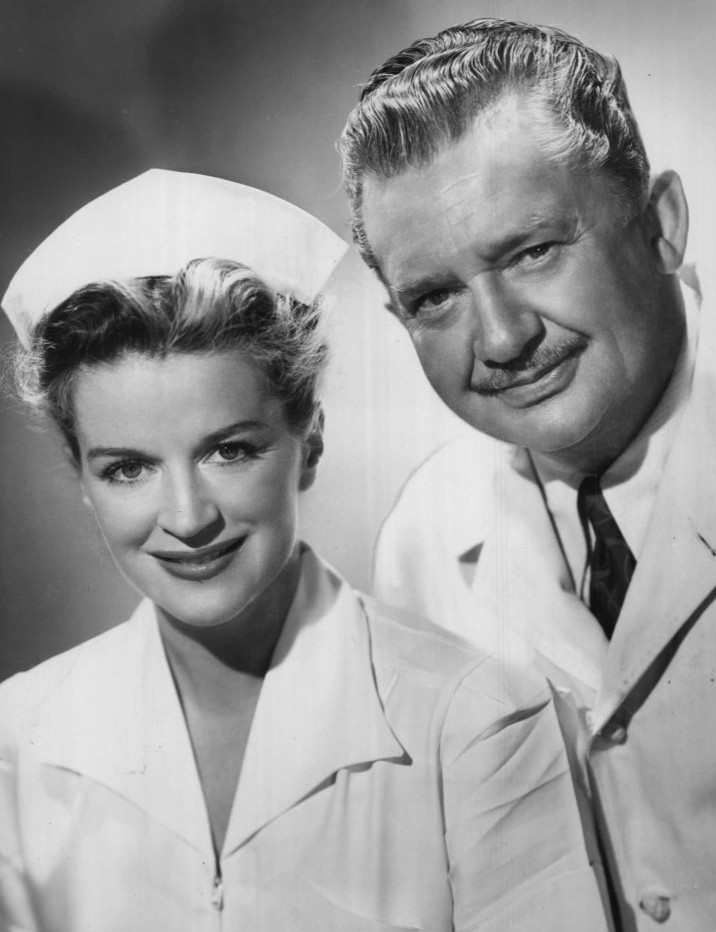
- Rosemary DeCamp as nurse Judy Price and Jean Hersholt as Dr. Paul Christian on the 1937-1954 'Dr. Christian' radio medical drama series on CBS Radio in 1953
- Genre: medical drama
- Running time: 30 minutes
- Country of origin: United States
- Language: English
- Syndicates: CBS
- TV adaptations: Dr. Christian
- Starring: Jean Hersholt; Rosemary DeCamp; Lurene Tuttle; Kathleen Fitz; Helen Claire
- Announcer: Art Gilmore; Andre Baruch; Perry King
- Directed by: Neil Reagan; John Wilkinson; Florence Ortman
- Produced by: Dorothy McCann; Joan Cannon
- Opening theme: Rainbow on the River
- Sponsored by: Vaseline products

Dr. Christian is a radio medical drama series with Jean Hersholt in the title role. It aired on the Columbia Broadcasting System (CBS Radio network) from November 7, 1937, to January 6, 1954. Two years after the conclusion of the long-running radio program, the series was adapted for television on 1956 where it aired in syndication also through CBS on the Ziv Television production company until 1957, with a younger "Dr. Mark Christian" portrayed by Macdonald Carey as Dr. Paul's nephew.

Hersholt had earlier portrayed the character Dr. John Luke, based on the real-life Dr. Allan Roy Dafoe, the Canadian obstetrician who delivered and cared for the famous Dionne Quintuplets children, in the 20th Century Fox studios movie The Country Doctor (1936) and its two sequels. He wanted to perform the same role on radio but could not get the rights. He decided then to create his character for a new radio program series and since he was also an enthusiast/fan of the Hans Christian Andersen collections of Danish fairy tales literature, he borrowed that name for his character of the thoughtful, reflective, philosophical character "Dr. Paul Christian".

== Overview ==
The program debuted as The Vaseline Program: Dr. Christian of River's Bend. Dr. Christian practiced in the Midwest town of River's End with the assistance of Nurse Judy Price (Rosemary DeCamp, Lurene Tuttle, Kathleen Fitz, Helen Claire). With the opening theme music of "Rainbow on the River," Dr. Christian was introduced on CBS November 7, 1937, on The Vaseline Program, aka Dr. Christian's Office and later Dr. Christian, sponsored by Chesebrough Manufacturing Company's Vaseline.

The small-town physician's good humor, innate common sense and scientific training helped drive off a series of villainous types who tried to interfere with the peaceful lifestyle of River's End, as well as dealing with personal problems among his many patients and the majority of those who lived in town. The program was also unique in that, by the mid-1940s, listeners contributed the majority of the scripts (some were "professionally polished" before they were used), and an annual script-writing competition introduced in 1942 was the highlight of every season- top prize: the $2,000 "Dr. Christian Award" {with several $500 "runner-up" prizes}; among the later winners were Rod Serling and Earl Hamner, Jr. Produced by Dorothy McCann, the radio series became a popular success, continuing on CBS until January 6, 1954.

Ad for Seattle station KIRO

Hersholt was so strongly identified with the role that he received mail asking for medical advice.

There were various spin-offs; Hersholt co-wrote a Dr. Christian novel and made a series of six family films as Christian for RKO from 1939 to 1941.

== Films ==
In release order:

- Meet Dr. Christian (1939)
- The Courageous Dr. Christian (1940)
- Dr. Christian Meets the Women (1940)
- Remedy for Riches (1940)
- Melody for Three (1941)
- They Meet Again (1941)

== Television ==
In 1956, the Dr. Christian character made the transition to television in a 39-episode syndicated Ziv Television series, scripted by Gene Roddenberry, with Macdonald Carey as his nephew Dr. Mark Christian. Jean Hersholt appeared for the last time as Dr. Christian in the first episode, officially turning his medical practice over to his nephew. Shortly after filming the episode, Hersholt died on June 2, 1956.

Among the series' guest stars was Mason Alan Dinehart, who played Danny Martin in the 1957 episode entitled "Typhoid". Stacy Harris appeared in the same segment as Warren.

In the episode "The Sprained Thumb" of the 1950s TV show The Honeymooners, Ralph Kramden sarcastically asks Trixie Norton, "Well, Dr. Christian, have you got any more suggestions?"

=== Season 1 (1956-57) ===
No. overall	No. in season	Title	Directed by	Written by	Original release date
1	1	"The Thin Line"	Herbert L. Strock	Story by : Albert E. Lewin and Burt Styler; Teleplay by : Jerry Adelman & Jack Laird	October 1, 1956
A noted citizen is seriously injured by an auto and the driver claims the man stepped in front of his car. His story is doubted and Dr. Christian tries to learn the truth.
2	2	"The Fighter"	Henry S. Kesler	Story by : Teleplay by : Leonard Freeman	October 8, 1956
An unscrupulous fight promoter advises Jackie, an arrogant young boxer, to believe his own publicity and Dr. Christian feels he must intervene for safety reasons.
3	3	"Escaped Convict"	Herbert L. Strock	Story by : Teleplay by : Ellis Marcus	October 15, 1956
Dr. Christian deals with a man who may die at any time but still can handle a gun with threatening ease.
4	4	"Homecoming"	Henry S. Kesler	Stuart Jerome	October 22, 1956
Dr. Christian helps a recovering mental patient return to his home and business and then finds the patient is totally unfamiliar with his past life.
5	5	"The Guardian"	Henry S. Kesler	Arthur Weiss	October 29, 1956
Dr. Christian promises a dying mother that he will look after her daughter and finds himself embroiled in a major family argument.
6	6	"Michael Higgins"	Paul Guilfoyle	Lee Berg	November 5, 1956
Though injured, foreman Mike Higgins stubbornly refuses to stop working.
7	7	"Insurance Policy"	Henry S. Kesler	Stuart Jerome	November 12, 1956
Walter Brandon takes out a large life insurance policy and dies shortly afterwards. His widow Betty has enormous feelings of guilt which sends her closer to a nervous breakdown unless Dr. Cristian can help.
8	8	"Parolee"	Paul Guilfoyle	Story by : Teleplay by : Lee Berg	November 19, 1956
Dr. Christian thinks he can help a troubled young man by have his imprisoned brother paroled. But after the older sibling is released it doesn't take long for Christian to realize he's responsible for an enormous mistake.
9	9	"Orphan"	Henry S. Kesler	Stuart Jerome	November 26, 1956
Dr. Christian tries to save an orphaned teen-ager from her scheming relatives.
10	10	"Locked Memory"	James Sheldon	Jack Rock	December 3, 1956
A Korean War veteran is convinced he accidentally killed his buddy while on a night patrol. The event's trauma has caused him to lose his speech and Dr. Christian works with the man to overcome his past.
11	11	"Intern"	Paul Guilfoyle	Vincent Fotre	December 10, 1956
Dr. Christian steps in to heal a breach between a young intern and his father when the latter asks the boy to give up the study of medicine.
12	12	"Cameraman"	Henry S. Kesler	William R. Cox	December 17, 1956
13	13	"The Legacy"	James Sheldon	Stuart Jerome	December 24, 1956
Dr. Christian inherits an estate of a recently deceased patient, and has his hands full with the woman's squabbling relatives.
14	14	TBA	Unknown	Story by : Teleplay by :	December 31, 1956
A patient with a bad heart refuses doctor's orders about exerting himself. It's up to Dr. Christian to convince the man to take better care of himself.
15	15	"Truck Driver"	Lew Landers	Lou Huston	January 7, 1957
A man is fired after getting into a fight with his co-worker. Dr. Christian, with the assistance of his secretary Betty, tries to get the driver his job back at the trucking firm plus get at the reason for the altercation.
16	16	"Bullet Wound"	Henry S. Kesler	Gene Roddenberry	January 14, 1957
A criminal is wounded and his two brothers decide to get him medical attention. They kidnap Dr. Christian and force him to operate under adverse conditions.
17	17	"Revenge"	Henry S. Kesler	Lee Berg	January 21, 1957
Rufus Corning blames Christian for his wife's death in surgery and vows revenge.
18	18	"Company Control"	Paul Guilfoyle	Jack Rock	January 28, 1957
When the president of a chemical company has a heart attack, crooks move in and take over the business.
19	19	"The Farm Story"	Herbert L. Strock	Doris Hursley and Frank Hursley	February 4, 1957
A father takes his son on a camping trip not realizing that the boy has a rheumatic heart.
20	20	"Vaccine"	Henry S. Kesler	Leonard Heideman	February 11, 1957
The dread disease, "Bubonic Plague" gives Dr. Christian a bad time when he learns of its spread in an outlying community and that delivery of the Navy's supply of life-saving serum will be delayed.
21	21	"Mother's Boy"	Eddie Davis	Jack Laird	February 18, 1957
A struggle to patch up a broken home to save the health and happiness of a small boy faces Dr. Christian.
22	22	"Haunted House"	Henry S. Kesler	Stuart Jerome	February 25, 1957
Janis Sommers is convinced her husband is trying to kill her. Dr. Christian is called in to evaluate the wife to see is she's mentally competent or telling the truth.
23	23	"Hit and Run"	Herbert L. Strock	Vincent Fotre	March 4, 1957
Johnny Haven and his friends are accused of being involved in a tragic auto accident. When they convincingly protest their innocence Dr. Christian decides to conduct his own investigation.
24	24	"The Bite"	Paul Guilfoyle	Don Brinkley	March 11, 1957
Dr. Christian tries desperately to save the life of a little boy bitten by a black widow spider.
25	25	"Once a Cop"	Paul Guilfoyle	William R. Cox	March 18, 1957
A retired policeman tries to prevent a robbery in which his daughter's boyfriend is involved.
26	26	"The Alien"	Henry S. Kesler	Jack Laird	March 25, 1957
Dr. Christian comes to the assistance of a man who entered the United States illegally.
27	27	"The Payoff"	Henry S. Kesler	Stuart Jerome	April 1, 1957
An man has been unjustly imprisoned years for a robbery he didn't commit. Upon release he retrieves the loot after learning its location. Dr. Christian tries to convince him to turn over the stolen cash.
28	28	"Plane Crash"	Henry S. Kesler	Jack Rock	April 8, 1957
Judy is a patient of Christian's who is expecting her first baby. Husband Andy is a pilot and when he disappears after his plane crashes the doctor must endeavor to save Judy and her unborn infant's lives.
29	29	"Amnesia"	Felix E. Feist	Irving H. Cooper	April 15, 1957
Ruth Belford loses her memory after an auto accident rigged by her husband, and Dr. Christian is brought in to help her overcome the experience.
30	30	"Mark! Danger!"	Henry S. Kesler	Stuart Jerome & P.K. Palmer	April 22, 1957
A series of mysterious accidents threatens to halt work on a top-secret project.
31	31	"Fear"	Eddie Davis	Lee Berg	April 29, 1957
Dr. Christian is stranded in a mountain lodge with a murderer.
32	32	"Typhoid"	Paul Guilfoyle	Joel Rapp	May 6, 1957
Dr. Christian learns of a typhoid outbreak and the focus turns to youthful Danny Martin, who fears that he, like his mother, is a typhoid carrier.
33	33	"Poison Control"	Eddie Davis	George Callahan	May 13, 1957
A desperate secretary takes some poison and is admitted to the hospital. As Dr. Christian's patient he must figure out how to save her life as the toxin has no antidote.
34	34	"The Philanthropist"	Paul Guilfoyle	Gene Roddenberry & Stuart Jerome	May 20, 1957
Dr. Christian is left a large sum of money in someone's will. He is baffled as he has no recollection of the person as a former patient.
35	35	"The Secret"	Eddie Davis	Leonard Heideman & Stuart Jerome	May 27, 1957
A man with just one year left to live decides to do everything he's ever dreamed of doing.
36	36	"Champion"	Eddie Davis	Jack Laird	June 3, 1957
A boxer, after working hard for his big chance, is about to fight for a championship belt. Dr. Christian learns from an examination that the pugilist will likely go blind from a blow to the head.
37	37	"Blackmail"	Eddie Davis	Jack Laird	June 10, 1957
Dr. Christian trusts his nurse Betty implicitly and when she's accused of blackmailing patients he's outraged. Christian works diligently to clear Betty's name.
38	38	"Question Of Suicide"	Unknown	Story by : Teleplay by :	June 17, 1957
Dr. Christian tells a man he is perfectly healthy and then faces a major problem when the man suddenly dies, is it murder or suicide?
39	39	"Rabies"	Lew Landers	Lee Berg	June 24, 1957
Dr. Christian invites controversy when one of his older patients is bitten by a rabid dog. The physician feels the man's weak heart will fail with given the shots and he proposes an alternative solution
40	40	"Old Man"	Henry S. Kesler	Jack Laird	1957
Dr. Christian has a delicate task as an older man is having difficulty adjusting to moving in with one of his children.

== Listen to ==
- Free OTR: Dr. Christian (175 free episodes)
