= Sing Your Worries Away =

1942 film by A. Edward Sutherland

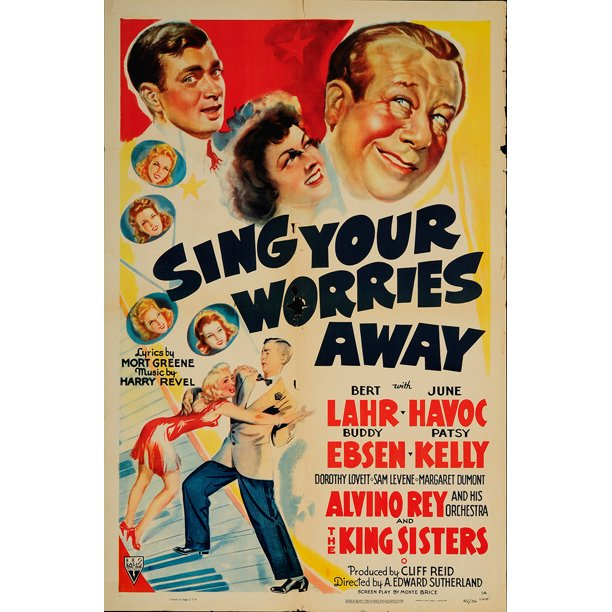
- Directed by: A. Edward Sutherland
- Screenplay by: Monte Brice
- Story by: Erwin Gelsey; Charles E. Roberts
- Produced by: Cliff Reid
- Starring: Buddy Ebsen; June Havoc; Patsy Kelly; Bert Lahr; Dorothy Lovett; Sam Levene
- Cinematography: Frank Redman
- Edited by: Henry Berman
- Distributed by: RKO Radio Pictures
- Release date: March 6, 1942 (US)
- Running time: 89 minutes
- Country: United States
- Language: English

Sing Your Worries Away is a 1942 musical film directed by A. Edward Sutherland and starring Buddy Ebsen, June Havoc, Patsy Kelly, Bert Lahr, Dorothy Lovett and Sam Levene.

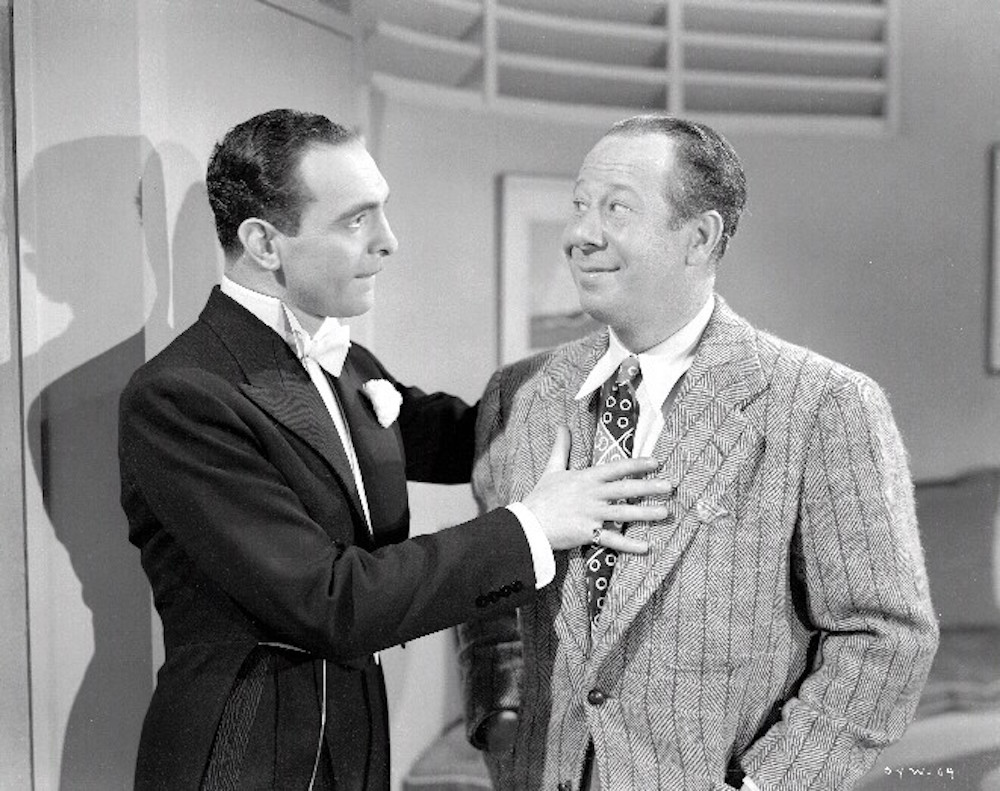
Sam Levene and Bert Lahr in Sing Your Worries Away

== Cast ==
- Buddy Ebsen as Tommy Jones
- Patsy Kelly as Bebe McGuire
- Bert Lahr as Chow Brewster
- June Havoc as Roxy Rochelle
- Dorothy Lovett as Carol Brewster
- Sam Levene as Smiley Clark
- Margaret Dumont as Flo Faulkner
- Alvino Rey as himself
- The King Sisters as themselves
- Don Barclay as Luke Brown (uncredited)
- Charles Middleton as Judge (uncredited)

== Box office ==
According to RKO records the film lost $255,000.
