= Erle C. Kenton =

American film director (1896–1980)

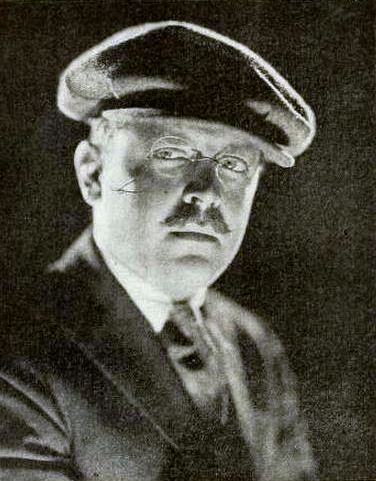
- Kenton in 1921
- Born: August 1, 1896; Norborne, Missouri, U.S.
- Died: January 28, 1980 (aged 83); Glendale, California, U.S.
- Occupation: Film director
- Years active: 1916–1957

Erle C. Kenton (August 1, 1896 – January 28, 1980) was an American film director. Kenton was director of B films, with his most famous film being Island of Lost Souls starring Charles Laughton.

== Biography ==
Before filmwork, Kenton was a school teacher and later decided to become an animal exhibitor. After working with various dog, pony and other animal shows, he entered the vaudeville circuit as a comedian. This led to him entering the film industry working on the Keystone Cops series of films making various short comedies.

Kenton began as a writer for Mack Sennett in 1914, and he directed feature films for Columbia Pictures, Tiffany Pictures, Paramount Pictures, RKO Pictures, Republic Pictures. He worked for Universal Pictures between 1941 and 1946 making films such as The Ghost of Frankenstein, House of Frankenstein, House of Dracula and The Cat Creeps and several films featuring comedians Abbott & Costello. Kenton was replaced by Charles Lamont on Hit the Ice after problems with Lou Costello.

Producer Paul Malvern stated later that Kenton and him "got along beautifully" and that "He was one director who thought everything out and made sure that he came in on budget and on time. He wasn't real fond of directing the Abbott and Costello films so he got a kick out of the monster films." Kenton spoke about directing horror films in a 1944 interview, stating "They give us a chance to let our imagination run wild. The art department can go to town on creep sets. Prop men have fun with cobwebs. The cameraman has fun with trick lighting and shadows. The director has fun. We have more fun making a horror picture than a comedy."

Kenton and Edward Ludwig were the principal directors of the 1958–1960 television series The Texan. Kenton died on January 28, 1980, of Parkinson's disease in Glendale, California. Malvern recalled that when he visited Kenton before his death, Kenton did not recognize him.

== Selected filmography ==
Title	Year	Credited as		Notes	Ref(s)
Title	Year	Director	Other	Notes	Ref(s)
Down on the Farm	1920	Yes			
Love, Honor and Behave	1920	Yes			
A Small Town Idol	1921	Yes			
Tea – With a Kick	1921	Yes			
The Haunted House	1922	Yes			
A Fool and His Money	1925	Yes			
Red Hot Tires	1925	Yes			
The Love Toy	1926	Yes			
Other Women's Husbands	1926	Yes			
The Palm Beach Girl	1926	Yes			
The Sap	1926	Yes			
Wedding Bill$	1927	Yes			
The Rejuvenation of Aunt Mary	1927	Yes			
The Girl in the Pullman	1927	Yes			
Bare Knees	1928	Yes			
The Sporting Age	1928	Yes			
Golf Widows	1928	Yes			
Name the Woman	1928	Yes	Yes	Screenwriter	
The Street of Illusion	1928	Yes			
Companionate Marriage	1928	Yes			
Nothing to Wear	1928	Yes			
The Sideshow	1928	Yes			
Father and Son	1929	Yes			
Trial Marriage	1929	Yes			
Song of Love	1929	Yes			
Mexicali Rose	1929	Yes			
A Royal Romance	1930	Yes			
The Last Parade	1931	Yes			
Lover Come Back	1931	Yes			
Left Over Ladies	1931	Yes			
X Marks the Spot	1931	Yes			
Guilty as Hell	1932	Yes			
Stranger in Town	1932	Yes			
Island of Lost Souls	1932	Yes			
From Hell to Heaven	1933	Yes			
Disgraced	1933	Yes			
Big Executive	1933	Yes			
Search for Beauty	1934	Yes			
You're Telling Me!	1934	Yes			
The Best Man Wins	1935	Yes			
Party Wire	1935	Yes			
The Public Menace	1935	Yes			
Devil's Squadron	1936	Yes			
Counterfeit	1936	Yes			
End of the Trail	1936	Yes	Yes	Actor, as Theodore Roosevelt	
The Devil's Playground	1937	Yes			
Racketeers in Exile	1937	Yes			
She Asked for It	1937	Yes			
The Lady Objects	1938	Yes			
Little Tough Guys in Society	1938	Yes			
Everything's on Ice	1939	Yes			
Escape to Paradise	1939	Yes			
South of Pago Pago	1940		Yes	Associate producer	
Remedy for Riches	1940	Yes			
Petticoat Politics	1941	Yes			
Melody for Three	1941	Yes			
Naval Academy	1941	Yes			
They Meet Again	1941	Yes			
Flying Cadets	1941	Yes			
North to the Klondike	1942	Yes			
The Ghost of Frankenstein	1942	Yes			
Frisco Lil	1942	Yes			
Pardon My Sarong	1942	Yes			
Who Done It?	1942	Yes			
How's About It	1943	Yes			
It Ain't Hay	1943	Yes			
Always a Bridesmaid	1943	Yes			
Crazy House	1943		Yes	Associate producer	
House of Frankenstein	1944	Yes			
She Gets Her Man	1945	Yes			
House of Dracula	1945	Yes			
The Cat Creeps	1946	Yes			
Little Miss Big	1946	Yes			
Bob and Sally	1948	Yes			
One Too Many	1951	Yes			
Secrets of Beauty	1951	Yes			
