= Highway 13 (film) =

1948 film

- Directed by: William Berke
- Written by: Maurice Tombragel
- Based on: story by John Wilste
- Produced by: William Stephens executive Robert L. Lippert
- Music by: Raoul Kraushaar
- Production company: Lippert Pictures
- Distributed by: Screen Guild Productions
- Release date: December 28, 1948
- Running time: 58 minutes
- Country: United States
- Language: English
- Budget: less than $60,000.

Highway 13 is a 1948 American drama film directed by William Berke and starring Robert Lowery. Lowery had just made Shep Comes Home for financier Robert L. Lippert.

== Plot ==
The Norris Trucking Company is plagued by several truck accidents along US highway 13 in the vicinity of Bishop, California. Heiress to the company, Henrietta Denton, also is in a fatal accident along the highway. Hank Wilson, a truck driver for the company, pulls over and attempts to help. Henrietta's husband Frank Denton goes to see the owner of the Norris Trucking Company, J.E. Norris and voices his concerns about the company not rigorously investigating the accidents despite his earlier recommendations. He recommends bringing in his war buddy to investigate.

Hank meets Doris who works at the Clover Cafe and Garage during one of his routes. Wondering when he’s going to propose, she asks if he’s asked for the raise that will allow him to get a down payment on a truck of his own he’s been delaying for. Mary Hadley, the personnel supervisor, is unconvinced Hank should get the raise. Frank Denton walks in and asks Hank if he’s the man who found his wife after the accident and if he noticed anything unusual about it. To which Hank said that no, but it is starting to seem a bit odd and coincidental to just be a run of the mill “jinx” as it’s been happening a few too many times and all in the same area. Frank thanks him, offers him the raise and excuses himself.

After the sixth accident, the investigator George Montgomery is hired as one of the company’s truck drivers under cover and shadows with Hank while on one of his routes. They stop at the diner and Hank tells Doris about the raise and to set a date. After a few weeks, George reports back to Frank that he’s narrowed it down to the Clover Cafe. He goes on to say the owner, Pops, also used to run with a gang in the 1920s. He also thinks there’s a possible motive to the accidents that would imply inside involvement.

Before returning to the company warehouse, Hank makes a stop over at the Cafe with a ring and proposes to Doris, who accepts. Back at the warehouse, Hank parks and heads in for a moment passing George on the way. A hand is seen releasing the brake on Hank's truck, allowing it to back into George, killing him.

On suspicion of homicide, Hank is taken in. An attorney for the insurance agency drops in to see Hank. He introduces himself as Keller and tells him that George has been in contact with the insurance company during his investigation and had believed Hank was in the clear. So, In a leap of faith they strike a deal where Hank gets reinstated at his job if he helps prove the accidents were intentional and figure out the motive behind it. But It’s better to keep it quiet, even with Doris. He later meets up with Keller who asks if he’s seen anything out of the ordinary, no matter how far fetched. Only that on the day he returned, Mary had seemed to make a play for him. Keller tells him to follow the lead despite Hanks protests of the tenuousness of the lead and being in a relationship.

Hank arrives at Mary’s office saying he was returning from a route and saw her light on. She makes advances and they kiss. Outside her office, the accounts manager notices the silhouettes of the two through the door. The next day, Hank sees Doris who is upset about rumors of him being with Mary. He tells her he can’t go into it and that it wasn’t the way it looks. But she doesn’t accept the explanation and ends the engagement.

Hank and Keller decide to change methods. Hank sets up a meeting with Doris saying he is able to be more open about what is going on. He explains how he was looking into the accidents and Pops’ involvement in the gangs. Doris informs Pops what Hank said about his past and that Hank accused him of the accidents. Pops calls Mary warning her that Hank has him “pinned to the wall and Labeled”. Hank waiting nearby, overhears the call and confronts pops, urging him to confess. Pops jumps him and ties him up.

Pops pulls up with a truck when Aunt Mert arrives. She protests and asks him to reconsider saying that he has enough on his conscience. He loads Hank into the truck and tells her to stay behind so she can’t be held responsible. Doris overhears and climbs into the back unnoticed by either of them. Pops then meets up with Frank and Mary. They decide that Pops is going to drive to the crest of the hill, set the throttle and hop out while Frank and Mary are driving behind to pick him up.

On the drive up, Mary expresses mild discomfort. Indignant, Frank replied with that it didn’t bother her when it was his wife. He is also uncertain with being able to get away with it. She tells him the only two men who can prove anything are about to be taken care of. They just have to tell the police Hank had wrecked the trucks because his mind was injured in the war and blackmailed Pops into doing his dirty work. She believes Keller will back their story as it will save his company from having to make the insurance payment.

Pops reaches the crest of the hill, sets the throttle and jumps. Doris, half hanging in from the back of the truck, attempts to take control of the truck while trying to wake Hank up. Pops gets hit by Frank’s car and left behind.

When Hank wakes up, he is able to stop the truck in the middle of the road. Frank and Mary soon catch up, not realizing the truck had stopped until it was too late. They swerve and drive off an embankment resulting in a crash. Hank is offered a reward, but he expresses his dismay of the circumstances that led to it. Doris asks if there are any chances of getting the red truck in Bakersfield.

== Cast ==
- Robert Lowery as Hank Wilson
- Pamela Blake as Doris Lacy
- Clem Bevans as Bill 'Pops' Lacy
- Michael Whalen as Frank Denton
- Steve Pendleton as George Montgomery (as Gaylord Pendleton)
- Lyle Talbot as Company Detective
- Maris Wrixon as Mary Hadley
- Mary Gordon as Aunt Mert Lacy
- Tom Chatterton as J.E. Norris (uncredited)

== Production ==
Producer William Stephen made it instead of Banana Boat.

It was originally called Roarin' Wheels and Hell on Wheels but both those titles were changed. It was changed again to Rolling Wheels.

Filming ended in November 1948.

Despite several shield -style route signs shown in the film, US Highway 13 is located in the east of the country with no connection to California.
