= Maude Eburne =

Canadian actress (1875–1960)

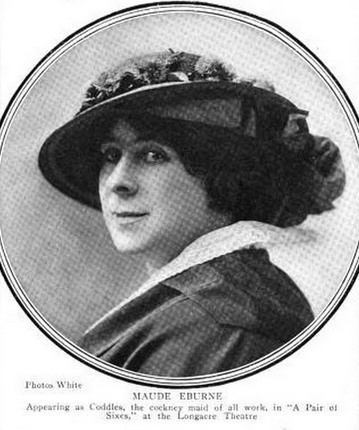
- Eburne in Theatre Magazine, 1914
- Born: Maud Eburne Riggs; November 10, 1875; Bronte-on-the-Lake, Ontario, Canada
- Died: October 15, 1960 (aged 84); Hollywood, California, U.S.
- Years active: 1915-1951
- Spouse: Eugene J. Hall (m. 1905; died 1932)
- Children: 1

Maude Eburne (born Maud Eburne Riggs, November 10, 1875 – October 15, 1960) was a Canadian character actress of stage and screen, known for playing eccentric roles.

== Early years ==
Eburne was born the daughter of John and Mary Riggs, in Bronte-on-the-Lake, Ontario. She studied elocution in Toronto.

The death of Eburne's father in 1901 was a catalyst for her entry into acting as a profession. She said that he would not have approved a stage career for her and added, "If my father knew I was on the stage, he would not rest in peace."

== Career ==
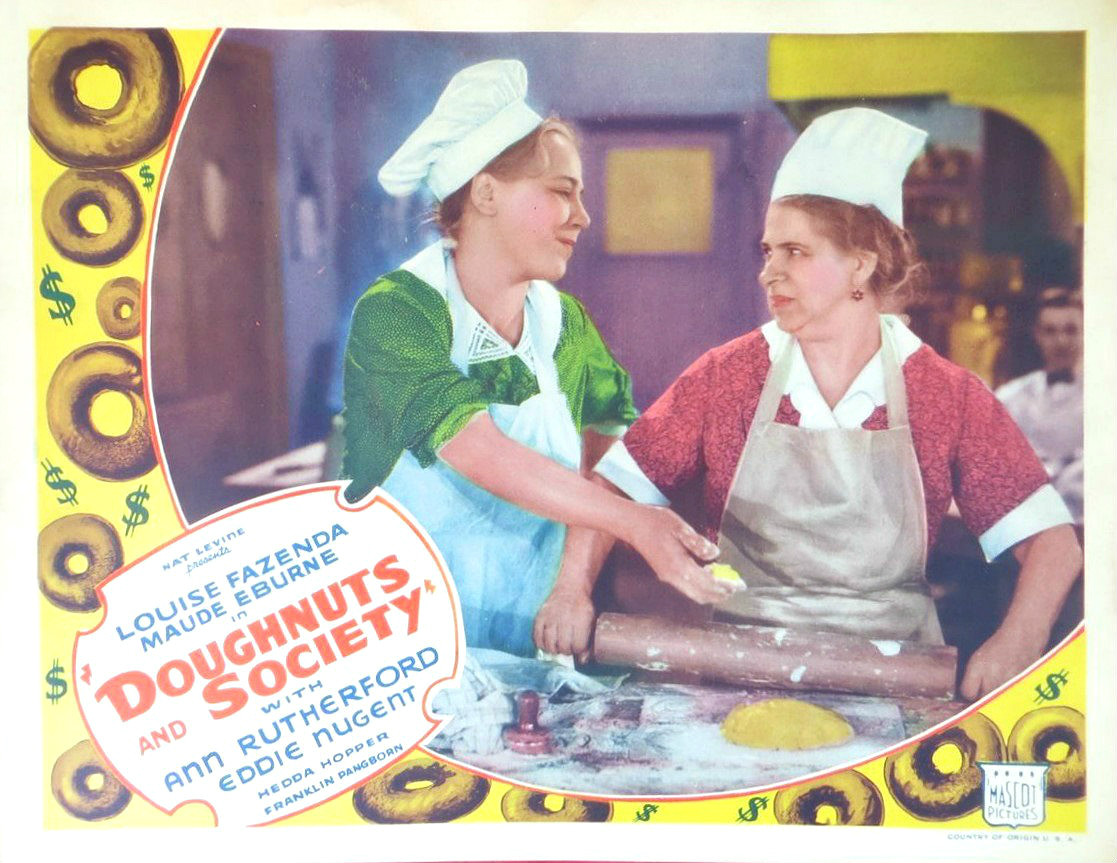
Lobby card with Louise Fazenda and Maude Eburne (right) in Doughnuts and Society (1936)

Eburne began her career in stock theater in Buffalo, New York. Her early theater work was in Ontario and New York City, debuting on Broadway to great acclaim as "Coddles" in the 1914 farce A Pair of Sixes. "When I first came to New York... I said I didn't want to be beautiful young girls or stately leading women, but wanted parts that had something queer in them, especially if there were dialect."

She continued to play mainly humorous domestic roles on stage, appearing in productions such as The Half Moon (1920), Lady Butterfly (1923), Three Cheers (1928) and Many a Slip (1930), before her first significant film role — and first sound film role — in The Bat Whispers (1930), director Roland West's sound remake of his 1926 silent feature The Bat.

== Personal life ==
Eugene J. Hall married Eburne "in about 1905". They had a daughter, Marion Birdseye Hall, in 1907. He died in 1932.

Eburne retired in 1951.

== Death ==
Eburne died on October 15, 1960, in Hollywood, California, at age 84.

== Partial filmography ==
Eburne's more than 100 films include:

- A Pair of Sixes (1918)
- Lonely Wives (1931)
- The Man in Possession (1931)
- Bought! (1931)
- The Guardsman (1931)
- Her Majesty, Love (1931)
- This Reckless Age (1932)
- Panama Flo (1932)
- The Passionate Plumber (1932)
- Polly of the Circus (1932)
- Faithless (1932)
- Robbers' Roost (1933)
- The Vampire Bat (1933)
- East of Fifth Avenue (1933)
- Ladies They Talk About (1933)
- Ladies Must Love (1933)
- Fog (1933)
- Shanghai Madness (1933)
- Lazy River (1934)
- Love Birds (1934)
- Ruggles of Red Gap (1935)
- Happiness C.O.D. (1935)
- The Leavenworth Case (1936)
- Doughnuts and Society (1936)
- Poppy (1936)
- Hollywood Cowboy (1937)
- Champagne Waltz (1937)
- Convict's Code (1939)
- Undercover Agent (1939)
- Exile Express (1939)
- Mountain Rhythm (1939)
- The Covered Trailer (1939)
- Dr. Christian Meets the Women (1940)
- Colorado (1940)
- Remedy for Riches (1940)
- The Border Legion (1940)
- Melody for Three (1941)
- West Point Widow (1941)
- Among the Living (1941)
- To Be or Not to Be (1942)
- Almost Married (1942)
- Henry and Dizzy (1942)
- The Boogie Man Will Get You (1942) (uncredited)
- Lady Bodyguard (1943)
- The Man from Oklahoma (1945)
- Hitchhike to Happiness (1945)
- Mother Wore Tights (1947)

== Sources ==
- Erickson, Hal (2011). "Maude Eburne: Biography". Movies & TV Dept. The New York Times. Archived from the original on May 19, 2011.
