= Secrets of Beauty =

- Theatrical release poster
- Directed by: Erle C. Kenton
- Written by: Kroger Babb; Mildred Horn; Erna Lazarus
- Produced by: Kroger Babb
- Starring: Ern Westmore; Julie Bishop; Richard Denning; Ginger Prince; Myrna Dell; Larry Blake; Norma Gilchrist; Virginia Herrick; Jo-Carroll Dennison; Jonnie Lee Macfadden; Arthur Lee Simpkins
- Cinematography: Carl Berger
- Edited by: Edward Mann
- Music by: Albert Glasser
- Production company: Hallmark Productions
- Distributed by: Modern Film Distributors, Alpha Video Distributors
- Release dates: 16 July 1951 (El Paso, Texas)
- Running time: 86 min
- Country: United States
- Language: English

Secrets of Beauty (also titled Why Men Leave Home) is a 1951 American drama film directed by Erle C. Kenton and starring Ern Westmore, Julie Bishop, Richard Denning. The film was released on DVD in 2006.

== Cast ==
- Julie Bishop as Ruth Waldron
- Richard Denning as Dr. John Waldron
- Ginger Prince as Ginger Waldron
- Ern Westmore as Himself
- Norma Gilchrist as Herself
- Virginia Herrick as Betty Westmore
- Larry Blake as Uncle Marty
- Jo-Carroll Dennison as Herself
- Myrna Dell as Kay Joyce
- Jonnie Lee Macfadden as Jonnie Lee
- Arthur Lee Simpkins as Himself
