= The Lawton Story =

1949 film by William Beaudine

- The Prince of Peace film poster, circa 1950.
- Directed by: William Beaudine; Harold Daniels
- Written by: W. Scott Darling; Mildred Horn; Rev. A. Mark Wallock
- Produced by: Kroger Babb; J. S. Jossey
- Starring: Ginger Prince; Forrest Taylor; Millard Coody
- Narrated by: Knox Manning
- Cinematography: Henry Sharp
- Edited by: Richard C. Currier
- Music by: Lee White
- Production company: Hallmark Productions
- Distributed by: Hygienic Productions; Modern Film Distributors
- Release date: 1 April 1949
- Running time: 101 minutes
- Country: United States
- Language: English

The Lawton Story of "The Prince of Peace", originally released as The Lawton Story and later reissued as The Prince of Peace, is a religious-themed film that later made the roadshow rounds presented by exploitation pioneer Kroger Babb. Filmed in Cinecolor in 1948, it is based on an annual passion play in Lawton, Oklahoma, "The Prince of Peace," created in 1926 by Rev. A. Mark Wallock. This Easter pageant became immensely popular among locals, attracting as many as 250,000 people.

The film was presented in various forms through the years following its debut. It also served as the debut film of child actress Ginger Prince, who was touted as her generation's Shirley Temple.

== Plot and production ==
The basis of the film is the annual Easter Sunday performance of the crucifixion of Jesus Christ, as performed by real-life residents of Lawton. These scenes were filmed by local director Harold Daniels. The finished film ran less than one hour, and producer Kroger Babb saw a chance to expand this amateur footage into a full-length feature film. He recruited Hollywood rewrite specialist W. Scott Darling to prepare a new framework using Hollywood character actors Forrest Taylor, Maude Eburne, Ferris Taylor, Lee "Lasses" White, William Ruhl, and Willa Pearl Curtis. Veteran director William Beaudine staged the new scenes, which were photographed by Henry Sharp and edited by Richard C. Currier. The amplified film ran 101 minutes, with the last half devoted to the Christ story.

The film's story revolves around a six-year-old girl (Prince) who becomes the positive influence in her town of Lawton. The girl, who lives with her grandfather in a small house, successfully convinces her great-uncle, a ruthless mortgage lender, to see the performance of a passion play in Lawton. The uncle is moved by the performance and changes his greedy and sinful ways. The new scenes with Prince were filmed over a six-day period by William Beaudine in Lawton.

It was marketed in a manner similar to other roadshow-style film productions, such as Mom and Dad. Promoters of the film often sold Bibles and faith pamphlets following screenings to capitalize on the religious element, often with a lecture during intermission. Kroger Babb had no issue with his attempts at making money off the religious topic, saying that "It's no sin to make a profit."

Babb, always alert for exploitation opportunities, decided to emphasize the young Ginger Prince as the screen's new Shirley Temple. The added footage emphasizes her contribution with many dialogue scenes and four songs. A native of Atlanta, Georgia, Prince was featured prominently in the film's advertising and promotion, which referred to her as "42 inches and 42 pounds of Southern Charm" and, in reference to a bathing scene with Prince, "soap washes off dirt, but only God can wash away your sins."

== Cast ==
- Ginger Prince - Ginger
- Forrest Taylor - Mark Wallock (Ginger's grandfather)
- Millard Coody - Himself/Jesus
- Ferris Taylor - Uncle Jonathan Wallock
- Gwynne Shipman (credited as Gwyn Shipman) - Jane (Ginger's Mother)
- Darlene Bridges - Herself/Virgin Mary
- Maude Eburne - Henrietta
- Willa Pearl Curtis - Willa Pearl
- Raymond Largay (credited as Ray Largay) - Dr. Martin
- A.S. Fischer - Himself/Simon Peter
- Hazel Lee Becker - Herself/Mary Magdalene
- William Ruhl - Mr. Nelson
- Russ Whiteman - Mr. Cole
- Knox Manning - Narrator

== Reception ==
Reviews praised the native pageant footage but criticized the Hollywood-staged portions. Modern Screen wrote: "The Pageant itself, filmed in the dawn against a natural setting of mountains, is stirring. The cast for the most part is composed of citizens of Lawton who know their Bibles better than their profiles. It's the sincerity of their nonprofessional acting which comes across, and turns the enactment of the life of Christ (played by Millard Coody) into a moving experience." Variety's review specifically criticized Prince's performance in the film, saying the movie would have been better "had not producers seen fit to drag in a crass, commercial showcasing of a precocious moppet, apparently in an attempt to strike a broader popular market."

Even with new, professionally filmed segments, the pageant footage had technical flaws -- telephone poles could be seen behind the crucifix—but viewers overlooked them and focused on the documentary aspects of the film. The local performers' Oklahoma accents were so strong that the producer decided to erase the soundtrack and re-record the dialogue with professional actors. The Lawton Story was described as "the only film that had to be dubbed from English to English." The original narration by DeVallon Scott was re-recorded by radio's Knox Manning.

The film premiered in Lawton to a respectable crowd. It opened in a new state every two weeks. After a month of release, it was claimed that the film had been watched by more than 276,000 people, half of which were said to be school-age children and young people. While it failed to be a mainstream hit because of its specialized subject matter, it did succeed regionally; the film's run in New York City was so successful that the New York Daily News called it "the Miracle of Broadway."
