= Walk the Walk =

1970 American exploitation film directed by Kroger Babb

- Directed by: Jac Zacha
- Written by: Jac Zacha
- Produced by: Jac Zacha; Kroger Babb
- Starring: Bernie Hamilton
- Cinematography: Stu Stallsmith
- Distributed by: Hallmark Productions
- Release date: 1970
- Running time: 87 minutes
- Country: United States
- Language: English

Walk the Walk is a 1970 American exploitation film produced by Kroger Babb. Released by Babb's Hallmark Productions company, it was written and directed by Jac Zacha. It tells the story of a young African-American man battling addiction to alcohol and heroin.

== See also ==
- List of hood films
