= One Too Many (1951 film) =

1950 film

- 1955 reissue poster as Mixed-Up Women
- Directed by: Erle C. Kenton
- Screenplay by: Malcolm Stuart Boylan
- Story by: Kroger Babb
- Produced by: Kroger Babb
- Starring: Ruth Warrick; Richard Travis; Ginger Prince; William Tracy; Rhys Williams
- Edited by: Edward Mann
- Music by: Bert Shefter
- Production company: Hallmark Productions
- Distributed by: Hallmark Productions
- Release date: January 1, 1951 (Wilmington, Ohio)
- Running time: 111 minutes
- Country: United States
- Language: English

One Too Many is a 1951 film produced by Kroger Babb, directed by Erle C. Kenton and starring Ruth Warrick.

== Plot ==
Helen Mason is slowly revealed to be an alcoholic, destroying her career as a concert pianist and her family in the process.

== Production ==
The film's story author and producer was Kroger Babb, who worked primarily on films about fringe subjects, such as the anti-drug film She Shoulda Said No (1949) and a film about the life of Jesus Christ titled The Lawton Story (1949).

Production began in August 1950.

== Release ==
One Too Many had its world premiere on January 1, 1951 at the Murphy Theatre in Wilmington, Ohio. Later that year, producer Kroger Babb changed the title from One Too Many to The Best Is Yet to Come, as the film had failed to attract a significant audience. The film was rereleased in 1955 under the title of Mixed-Up Women.
