= J. S. Jossey =

American film producer

Jack S. Jossey (born Julian S. Jossey) (c.1893 - 21 November 1952) was an American film producer and businessman. Active in the motion picture trade in Ohio for more than three decades, he managed film exchanges in Cleveland and Cincinnati, held the Monogram Pictures franchise for northern Ohio and later served as a vice-president of that company, and operated theatres in Ohio and drive-in theatres in Canada. In the 1940s he formed Hygienic Productions with Kroger Babb to produce and distribute exploitation films.

A Seagram stockholder, he helped finance and film many exploitation films during the 1940s, including Mom and Dad and The Prince of Peace.

== Career ==
=== Early career ===
Jossey came to Cleveland from Forsyth, Georgia. By late 1916 he was manager of the northern Ohio branch of the Tri-State Film Exchange, based in the Sincere Building in Cleveland.

In association with George Jacobs he formed the Western Pictures Company to distribute state rights pictures. After that partnership was dissolved he founded Progress Pictures, another independent distributor of state rights product. By the end of 1922 he was described in the trade press as chief executive of the Progress Picture Company of Cleveland, alongside vice-president and general manager E. C. Fielder, and in 1924 he was reported as the company's president.

=== Monogram Pictures ===
Jossey distributed independent pictures through both Monogram and Republic. In 1933 he was listed with the Standard Film Exchange in Cincinnati. As Monogram's franchise holder in Cleveland he reported in 1934 that the company's product had been booked by every first-run house in the city with one exception, which he said was the first such record for any independent product there.

He attended the company's franchise-holder conferences with president W. Ray Johnston and production head Trem Carr, and by early 1935 was described in the trade press as a vice-president of Monogram. That year he married June Farley of Cleveland.

=== Theatre operations ===
Jossey moved from distribution into exhibition. He headed the Valley Amusement Company, which owned and operated the Oxford and Miami theatres in Oxford, Ohio and the Mariemont and Rialto in Cincinnati; he sold the circuit around 1949. He also held financial interests in the Mayland in Cleveland, and in theatres in Berea, Medina and Akron.

In 1948 he was in Canada supervising the opening of drive-in theatres in Toronto. Late that year Jossey, Herbert Ochs and their associates granted an option to buy on five Canadian drive-in theatres to A. C. Cowan of Toronto.

=== Hygienic Productions ===
With Kroger Babb, Jossey formed Hygienic Productions and Hallmark Productions, which produced and distributed exploitation pictures. Trade coverage in 1948 identified the two men as co-owners of Hygienic, then distributing Mom and Dad through a large touring sales organisation. The company operated a Canadian arm and a subsidiary, Hollywood Productions. In 1948 Hygienic signed the five-year-old performer Ginger Prince.

Jossey sold his interests in both companies to Babb, and in the months before his death was no longer active in either.

== Death ==
Jossey died in Cleveland in November 1952 at the age of 59, after several years of illness with a heart ailment.
