= Mildred Horn =

American screenwriter

- Born: Anna Horn; January 4, 1901; Erie, Pennsylvania, U.S.
- Died: June 7, 1998 (aged 97); Indian Wells, California, U.S.
- Occupations: Screenwriter, film critic
- Spouse: Kroger Babb

Mildred Horn (January 4, 1901 – June 7, 1998) was an American film critic and screenwriter, best known for her work on the Kroger Babb exploitation film Mom and Dad.

== Biography ==
Horn was born in Erie, Pennsylvania, and studied at Academy High School. She later moved to Indianapolis, Indiana, where she became a film critic for a local paper.

When Horn was sent to review Kroger Babb's production of Child Bride, she was horrified that such a "cheap, crude, mislabeled morality play would be shown in a major Indiana family theater." In Horn's opinion, the film was material for a shoddy sideshow tent at some backwoods county fair.

Babb later met with Horn, and instead of Horn writing a scathing review, they entered into a personal and professional relationship that would last 40 years until his death in 1980. They enjoyed a common-law marriage after 1944, only making it official when Babb's first wife, Toby, consented to a divorce in the late '60s.

Together with Jack Jossey, they formed Hygienic Productions (later renamed Hallmark Productions), and she wrote the screenplay for their best-known production, Mom and Dad. The film was presented in a unique way, and included lectures and the sale of hygiene books that Horn wrote.

Horn also wrote the screenplays for Why Men Leave Home, a film about female beauty, and Prince of Peace, a passion play.

== Selected works ==
=== Films ===
- Mom and Dad, screenplay (1945)
- The Prince of Peace, a.k.a. The Lawton Story, screenplay (1949)
- Why Men Leave Home, a.k.a. Secrets of Beauty, screenplay (1951)

=== Books ===
- Man and Boy (1944)
- Woman and Girl (1944)
