= Mondor =

Mondor is a surname. It may refer to:

- Ben Mondor (1925-2010), American baseball team owner
- Card Mondor (1922-2001), Australian magician and stage performer
- Colleen Mondor, an editor of Eclectica Magazine
- Émilie Mondor (1981-2006), Canadian Olympic athlete
- Henri Mondor (1885-1962), French physician and historian
- Pierre Mondor, a character in Too Many Cooks, a Nero Wolfe novel by American author Rex Stout
