= Ginger Prince =

American actress

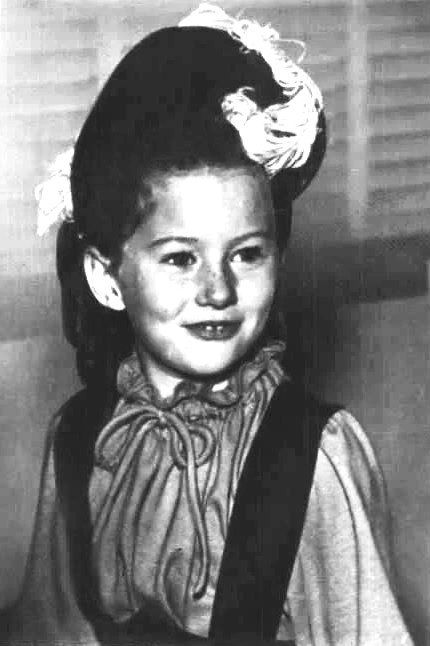
- Prince in 1948
- Born: Ginger Lee Prince; 3 June 1942; Stuart, Florida, U.S.
- Died: 20 May 2015 (aged 72); Englewood, New Jersey, U.S.
- Occupation: Actress
- Years active: 1940s–2007
- Spouse: Bill Hall (m. 1960; div. 1974)
- Children: 2

Ginger Lee Prince (June 3, 1942–May 20, 2015) was a child actress, best known for her roles in a handful of Hallmark Productions pictures. She starred in three of Kroger Babb's productions. She then returned to Atlanta, GA to host a radio program, "Ginger from Georgia".

== Early years ==
Prince was born on June 3, 1942 in Stuart, Florida. She was the daughter of Hugh Frederick Prince and Gladys Davis. Her mother enrolled her in a modeling school when she was 4 years old, and she began modeling then.

== Career ==
Prince began working on radio at WBGE in Atlanta in 1948, playing records for boys and girls. She supplemented recorded music with interviews of studio guests. Her career shifted from radio to film when Babb saw her modeling in a fashion show. He gave her a seven-year contract to work in films for his Hollywood Productions studio.

She later performed in Babb's 1950 narrative on alcoholism, One Too Many, with two musical numbers, and in the female beauty film The Secrets of Beauty with Hollywood makeup artist Ern Westmore.

She spent the rest of her childhood in Atlanta, dancing and experiencing a typical '50's girlhood before attending Stephens College in Missouri. However, the bright lights beckoned and she headed to New York to fulfill her dreams. She performed in summer stock at Casa Manana, and several other productions before returning to Atlanta and marrying, having two daughters, and becoming a choreographer for the Southern Ballet and later the Atlanta Ballet. She won a National Choreographer's Grant for her critically acclaimed modern ballet, "Lifeline". She also served on the Georgia Council for the Arts during Jimmy Carter's years as governor.

She returned to acting in earnest in the late 1970s. She appeared in many productions at the Golden Apple Dinner Theatre in Sarasota, Florida, and summer stock at The Brunswick Music Theatre in Brunswick, Maine. In the early 1980s, she returned to New York. In 1984, she landed a national tour of Pippin with Ben Vereen in the role of Fastrada. Then, the original cast of the Off Broadway Steel Magnolias on Christopher Street at the Lucille Lortel Theatre.

Ginger filled in time with other summer stock productions and sharing the love of her acting craft at Sande Shurin's acting studio. She taught some beginner courses in acting, and some courses at Marymount Manhattan College. From her early days with the Atlanta Ballet, she always thought of herself as a teacher.

== Later years ==
In early 2007, Ginger moved to Prospect Park Residence, an assisted living facility, in Brooklyn, New York; she remained there for approximately two years before transferring to The Lillian Booth Actors Home of the Actors Fund in Englewood, New Jersey.

== Roles ==
- The Prince of Peace (1948)
- One Too Many (1950)
- Secrets of Beauty (1951)
- "Lifeline" ballet 1975 and over 80 productions of musical and straight plays
