= Karamoja (film) =

- Uncensored Sights That Can Never Be Filmed Again!
- Directed by: William B. Treutle
- Written by: T.F. Woods
- Produced by: Kroger Babb
- Distributed by: Hallmark Productions; Modern Film Distributors
- Release date: 1954
- Country: United States

Karamoja was a 1954 film produced by exploitation filmmaker Kroger Babb. A documentary film of a native tribe from Uganda, the film was marketed by Babb to focus on the imagery that would be shocking to an American audience, including advertising which claimed that the tribe wore "only the wind and live[d] on blood and beer."

Scenes in the film included "the bleeding of cattle and drinking of the warm blood, and self-mutilation as a form of ornamentation," as well as a full-color circumcision scene.

Karamoja proved to be less controversial than many of Babb's other films, grossing less in box office revenue as a result.
