= Mom and Dad (1945 film) =

1945 film by William Beaudine

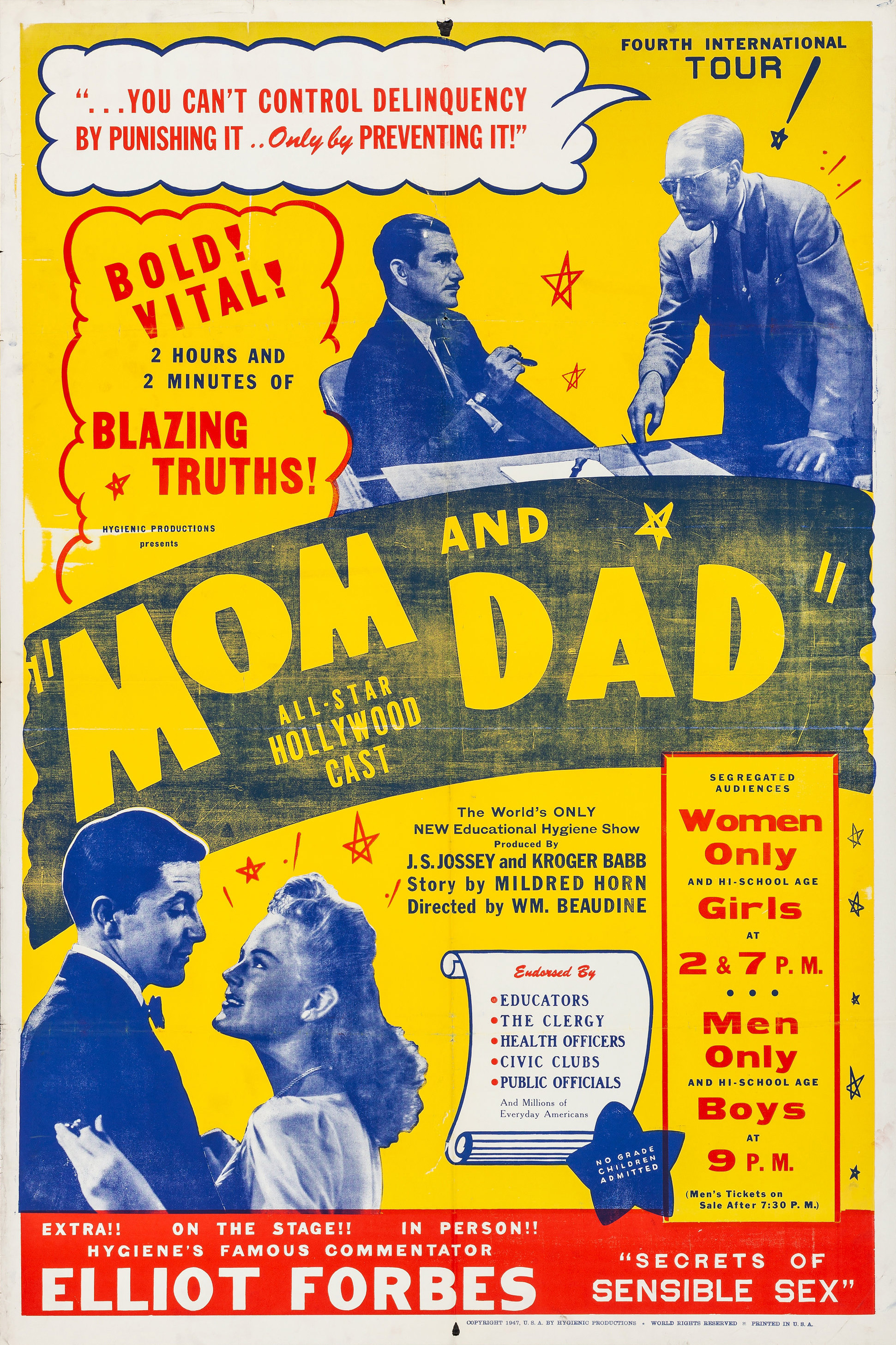
- Poster dated 1947 listing times for sex-segregated screenings of the film
- Directed by: William Beaudine
- Screenplay by: Mildred Horn
- Story by: Kroger Babb; Mildred Horn
- Produced by: Kroger Babb; J. S. Jossey
- Starring: Hardie Albright; Lois Austin; George Eldredge; June Carlson; Jimmy Clark; Bob Lowell
- Cinematography: Marcel LePicard
- Edited by: Richard Currier
- Music by: Edward J. Kay
- Distributed by: Hygienic Productions; Hallmark Productions
- Release date: January 3, 1945
- Running time: 97 minutes
- Country: United States
- Language: English
- Budget: $67,001
- Box office: $40–100 million (estimated)

Mom and Dad is a 1945 American sexploitation film directed by William Beaudine, and largely produced by the exploitation film maker and presenter Kroger Babb. Mom and Dad is considered the most successful film within its genre of "sex hygiene" films. Although it faced numerous legal challenges and was condemned by the National Legion of Decency, it became one of the highest-grossing films of the 1940s.

The film is regarded as an exploitation film as it was repackaged controversial content designed to establish an educational value that might circumvent U.S. censorship laws. Babb's marketing of his film incorporated old-style medicine show techniques, and used unique promotions to build an audience. These formed a template for his later works, which were imitated by his contemporary filmmakers. In 2005, the film was selected for preservation in the United States National Film Registry by the Library of Congress as being "culturally, historically, or aesthetically significant". The Academy Film Archive preserved Mom and Dad in 2010.

== Plot ==
Mom and Dad tells the story of Joan Blake (June Carlson), a young woman who falls for the pilot Jack Griffin (Bob Lowell). After being sweet-talked by Griffin, she has sex with him. Joan requests "hygiene books" from her mother, Sarah Blake (Lois Austin); however, the mother refuses because the daughter is not yet married. Joan later learns from her father, Dan Blake (George Eldredge), that the pilot has died in a crash. She tears up a letter she had been writing to him and lowers her head as the film fades into intermission.

The film resumes at the point when Joan discovers that her clothes no longer fit, sending her into a state of despair. She takes advice from her teacher, Carl Blackburn (Hardie Albright), who had previously been fired for teaching sex education. Blackburn blames her mother for the problem, and accuses her of "neglect[ing] the sacred duty of telling their children the real truth." Only then is Joan able to confront her mother.

The film then presents reels and charts that include graphic images of the female anatomy and footage of live births – one natural and one Caesarian. In some screenings, a second film was shown along with Mom and Dad, and contained images portraying syphilis and venereal disease. Mom and Dad is believed to have had a number of endings, although most typically concluded with the birth of the young woman's child, sometimes stillborn and other times put up for adoption.

== Cast ==
- Hardie Albright as Carl Blackburn, the teacher
- Lois Austin as Sarah Blake, the mother
- George Eldredge as Dan Blake, the father
- June Carlson as Joan Blake, the teen-age girl
- Jimmy Clark as Joan's brother
- Bob Lowell as Jack Griffin, the pilot
- Jane Isbell as Mary Lou, Joan's friend
- Jimmy Zaner as Allen Curtis, Joan's hometown boyfriend
- Robert Filmer as Superintendent McMann
- Willa Pearl Curtis as Junella, the Blake family's African-American maid
- Virginia Van as Virginia, Dave's girlfriend
- Forrest Taylor as Dr. Ashley, the obstetrician
- Jack Roper as The coach

The official credits also acknowledge The Four Liphams as well as the California State Champion dancers of the jitterbug.

== Production ==
Despite the commercially successful run of Babb's debut film, Dust to Dust—a reworked version of the 1938 film Child Bride—his production company Cox and Underwood disbanded, forcing him to form his own unit, Hygienic Productions. Having attended a meeting in Burkburnett, Texas, that discussed the alleged impregnations of young women by G.I.s from nearby Sheppard Air Force Base, Babb was inspired to shoot a film based on the subject. His future wife Mildred Horn drafted a screenplay which later evolved into Mom and Dad. Babb located 20 investors willing to fund the movie, and hired William Beaudine as director.

Production of the film cost Babb and his investors a total of $67,001.12. The movie was shot in five separate studios over six days in 1944, and was spread across various Monogram Pictures lots; co-producer J. S. Jossey was a Monogram stockholder. On January 3, 1945, Mom and Dad premiered at the Warner Bros. theatre in Oklahoma City, Oklahoma.

The plot is padded with a large amount of filler. Films of this type were usually produced quickly and at minimal cost, and while filler was sometimes used to increase the production value, the usual motivation was to extend its running time to qualify for feature length status. Eric Schaefer notes that the "primary purpose" of the plot of Mom and Dad was to "serve as the vehicle onto which the spectacle of the clinical reels can be grafted", such as the live birth scene. The marketing materials suggest the latter reason also, and many posters for the film promised that "You [will] actually SEE the birth of a baby!" The dialogue is carefully worded, and uses period euphemisms rather than explicit terms that may have been controversial at the time. In particular, at no time does the film specifically mention sexual intercourse or pregnancy.

== Marketing and presentation ==
Trailer for Mom and Dad

In a Washington Post article covering Babb's career, the film critic Kenneth Turan wrote that Mom and Dad did not "flourish because of its birth footage or because of its puerile plot, which Babb himself disparages ... [its] success flowed, rather, from Babb's extraordinary promotional abilities." The film was exhibited across the United States, and over 300 prints were produced. In the weeks preceding the screening, local presenters sought to attract the attention of the town's inhabitants by distributing letters to local newspapers and church leaflets protesting against the film's moral basis. This strategy often utilized fabricated letters supposedly written by the mayor of a nearby city, who wished to register concern about local young women in his area who had seen the film and were awakened enough to discuss problems similar to ones of their own.

The campaigns were usually orchestrated by employees of either Hygienic or Hallmark Productions, and they nominally based their campaign from information provided by a standard and detailed pressbook containing cast and crew information, as well as other promotional and marketing materials. Babb's marketing strategy centered on overwhelming small towns with advertisements and letters, in an attempt to create a controversial atmosphere. In keeping with his motto of "You gotta tell 'em to sell 'em," the film became so ubiquitous that Time wrote that its presentation "left only the livestock unaware of the chance to learn the facts of life."

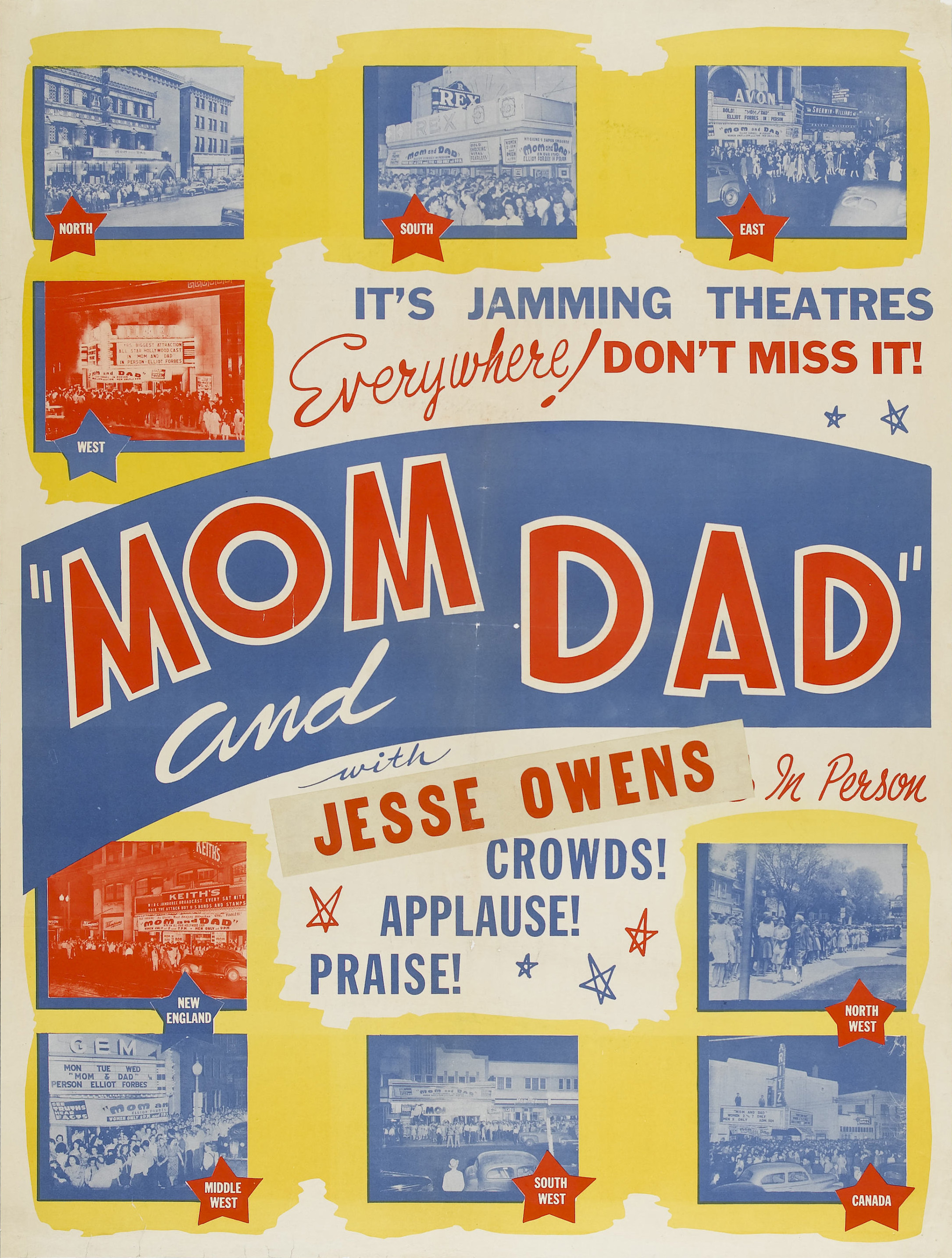
Poster promoting screenings of Mom and Dad with in-person appearances by Jesse Owens, the athlete and Olympian

The local pitch included a variety of limited screenings, including adults-only showings, viewings segregated by gender, and a live lecture by the "Fearless Hygiene Commentator Elliot Forbes" which was often placed during the intermission. At any one time, a number of "Elliot Forbes"es would give simultaneous talks in a number of locations showing the film. In some predominantly African-American areas, Olympic gold medalist Jesse Owens was hired to make appearances instead of an actor playing Forbes. The "Elliot Forbes" actors were usually people local to the production company, sometimes out-of-work performers. Along with "Forbes", presentations were often held with "nurses" in attendance, ostensibly in the event that someone fainted due to the content of the film; such "nurses" were often hired locally.

Modern Film Distributors later distributed the film, and sold over forty-five thousand copies of the books Man and Boy and Woman and Girl following Forbes's lecture. The text was written by Babb's wife, and was filled with both biological and sexual education materials relevant to the film's subject matter; generating extra profit items for their distributors. The sales of these books netted an estimated $31,000 for the distribution company, while Babb estimated the total sales for all distributions at 40 million copies.

Babb insisted that the program be followed closely; a contractual agreement with theaters required that each presentation follow a similar approach. Because the Forbes lecture formed part of the viewing, extra newsreels or short films were not permitted, although previews were allowed. A contractual agreement disallowed matinée pricing, set specific times for the segregated viewings, and prohibited the screening of the film on Sundays.

== Reception ==
Mom and Dad is the third highest-grossing film of the 1940s in dollar value, and returned close to $63 for each dollar invested by its backers. The Los Angeles Times estimates that the film grossed between $40 million and $100 million, and it has been cited as the most successful sex hygiene film ever released. It remains the most profitable pre-1960 exploitation film; ranking among the top ten grossing films of both the 1940s and 1950s, even when scaled against those year's mainstream releases.

The film was at the center of many high-profile lawsuits and condemnations. The exploitation genre was pitched against numerous challenges during the 1940s and 1950s, and fought many local censorship battles, and fought bitterly against the motion picture censorship system. It has been claimed that nearly 428 lawsuits were laid against both Babb and Mom and Dad during the film's run. Babb often used the supposed educational value of his films as an offer of defense, and recommended such tactic to theater owners in his pressbooks. One successful challenge was in New York City, where Mom and Dad remained censored until 1956, when the Appellate Division of the New York State Supreme Court overturned the ruling of the censorship board, deciding that human birth did not qualify as "indecent".

According to Modern Film Distributors, as of the end of 1956, the film has been dubbed into a dozen languages and attended by an estimated worldwide attendance figure of over 175 million people, at over 650,000 performances. By then Babb claimed it had played in 47 states (excluding Kansas) and 72 other countries grossing $22 million worldwide. Card Mondor purchased the rights to exhibit the film in New Zealand and Australia during the mid-1960s, almost twenty years after the film's debut. In the late 1970s, a story on Babb by the Press-Enterprise estimated that the film had been dubbed into 18 languages.

The film's success spawned a number of imitators, who sought to saturate the market with genre imitations. In particular, Street Corner (1948) recycled Babb's plot, substituting a concerned physician for a concerned teacher. In 1948, Universal produced a similar film, The Story of Bob and Sally, but was unable to screen it due to the production code, and eventually sold the rights. The volume of imitations led to the formation of Modern Film Distributors, a group of exploitation filmmakers, in an effort to minimize booking conflicts.

In 1969, the film was submitted to the Motion Picture Association of America for a film rating, in order to allow the film be shown in traditional movie theaters; it received an R rating. The film was such a success that it is still shown decades later around the world. In 2005, a version was added to the National Film Registry.

== See also ==
- List of sex hygiene films
