= Square up =

Square up may refer to:

- Square Up, a 2018 album by South Korean girl group Blackpink
- Square-up, a title card at the start of an exploitation film
- Square up (baseball), to hit a ball near its center
- squareup.com, the website of financial services platform Square
