= Kwaheri =

- The Film That Stretches Your Eyes -- SEE Pygmies With Fantastic PHYSICAL ENDOWMENTS!
- Directed by: David Chudnow; Thor Brooks
- Produced by: Kroger Babb
- Starring: Les Tremayne
- Distributed by: Hallmark Productions
- Release date: 1964
- Country: United States
- Language: English

Kwaheri, also known as Kwaheri: Vanishing Africa or Kwaheri: The Forbidden, is a 1964 mondo film directed by David Chudnow and Thor Brooks. The film was a pseudo-documentary about vanishing native tribes in Africa. Kwaheri means Goodbye in Swahili.

As the film focused more on the controversial aspects of the tribal societies, it gained the attention of exploitation filmmakers, including Kroger Babb, whose Hallmark Productions distribution company acquired the American rights.

== External links and references ==
- IMDb.
- "Kroger Babb to Handle Kwaheri in 11 States," BoxOffice, 26 April 1965.
