= The Amazing Transparent Man =

1960 film

- Theatrical release poster
- Directed by: Edgar G. Ulmer
- Screenplay by: Jack Lewis
- Produced by: Lester Guthrie
- Starring: Marguerite Chapman; Douglas Kennedy; James Griffith; Ivan Triesault
- Cinematography: Meredith M. Nicholson
- Edited by: Jack Ruggiero
- Music by: Darrell Calker
- Production company: Miller Consolidated Pictures
- Distributed by: MCP Film Distributing Co.
- Release date: February 1960
- Running time: 57 minutes
- Country: United States
- Language: English

The Amazing Transparent Man is a 1960 American science fiction thriller B-movie directed by Edgar G. Ulmer and starring Marguerite Chapman (in her final feature film) and Douglas Kennedy. The plot follows an insane ex–U.S. Army major who uses an escaped criminal to steal materials to improve the invisibility machine his scientist prisoner made. It was one of two sci-fi films shot back-to-back in Dallas, Texas by Ulmer (the other was Beyond the Time Barrier, also released that same year). The production had an approximate budget of $100,000 or a little over $1,000,000 today (2025). The combined filming schedule for both films was only two weeks.

It was released briefly in February 1960, then re-released on Sept. 8, 1960 on a double bill with Beyond the Time Barrier (1960). The film was also featured in an episode of Mystery Science Theater 3000.

== Plot ==
Former U.S. Army major Paul Krenner plans to conquer the world with an army of invisible soldiers and will do anything to achieve that goal. With the help of his hired thug Julian, Krenner forces Dr. Peter Ulof to perfect the invisibility machine that Ulof invented. He imprisons Ulof's daughter Maria to ensure Ulof's compliance.

The nuclear materials that Ulof needs to improve his invisibility machine are extremely rare and kept under guard in government facilities. Krenner arranges the prison break of notorious safecracker Joey Faust to steal the materials that he needs. Faust will do the jobs while invisible. Krenner offers Faust money for the jobs and Faust expresses grievances against working for him. Faust threatens to inform on Krenner if he is returned to prison, but Krenner warns Faust that he is wanted dead or alive, and so his life is expendable. Faust reluctantly complies; however, when he meets Krenner's female accomplice, Laura Matson, he slowly charms her into a double cross.

Faust continues attempting to escape, and it seems he might succeed while invisible. However, Dr. Ulof's test guinea pig dies and, during the second time that he is invisible, Faust uncontrollably reverts from invisible to visible and back again. Despite these drawbacks, Faust is intent on breaking free from Krenner's control.

Dr. Ulof reveals to Faust that both of them are dying from radiation poisoning as a side effect of the invisibility machine. He convinces Faust to stop Krenner. Faust and Krenner fight in the lab until an accidental nuclear explosion kills them both and puts an end to Krenner's plans for world conquest.

== Cast ==
Actor	Role
Marguerite Chapman	Laura Matson
Douglas Kennedy	Joey Faust
James Griffith	Maj. Paul Krenner
Ivan Triesault	Dr. Peter Ulof
Boyd 'Red' Morgan	Julian
Carmel Daniel	Maria Ulof
Edward Erwin	Drake
Jonathan Ledford	Smith
Norman Smith	security guard
Patrick Cranshaw	security guard
Kevin Kelly	woman
Dennis Adams	State Police officer
Stacy Morgan	State Police officer

== Production and release ==
The film was produced by Miller-Consolidated Pictures, which provided it a brief release in February 1960. After the bankruptcy of Miller-Consolidated, The Amazing Transparent Man and Beyond the Time Barrier were picked up by American International Pictures for the lab costs and released again on September 8, 1960, as a double feature.

== Reception ==
The Monthly Film Bulletin wrote: "Gimcrack SF-cum-crime melodrama, lacking in personality and invention. The film resembles nothing so much as those tatty little mad-scientist thrillers Bela Lugosi was making at Pathé-Monogram twenty years ago, with the exception that their saving grace of unconscious humour is here totally absent. Acting, staging and script are all consistently abysmal."

== Mystery Science Theater 3000 ==
The Amazing Transparent Man was featured in episode #623 of Mystery Science Theater 3000 (MST3K) along with The Days of Our Years, a workplace safety short film. The episode debuted March 18, 1995 on Comedy Central. The episode did not make the Top 100 list of episodes as voted upon by MST3K Season 11 Kickstarter backers. Writer Jim Vorel concurred with the fans' opinion, ranking the episode #140 (out of 191 total MST3K episodes). Vorel calls The Amazing Transparent Man "instantly forgettable" and claims that the short "completely steals the show".

The MST3K version of The Amazing Transparent Man was included as part of the Mystery Science Theater 3000, Volume XXXIX DVD collection released by Shout! Factory on November 21, 2017. The other episodes in the four-disc set include Girls Town (episode #601) and Diabolik (episode #1013). The fourth disc, titled "Satellite Dishes," collects non-movie segments from MST3K episodes that are unlikely to be collected on DVD.
