= Miller-Consolidated Pictures =

Miller-Consolidated Pictures was a film production company. Formed by John Miller in 1959, the company specialized in low-budget films. The company also had many known names on its board, including exploitation film presenter Kroger Babb, who was in charge of marketing.

== Selected filmography ==
- Date With Death (1959)
- The Amazing Transparent Man (1960)
- Beyond the Time Barrier (1960)
