= Bernie Hamilton =

American actor (1928–2008)

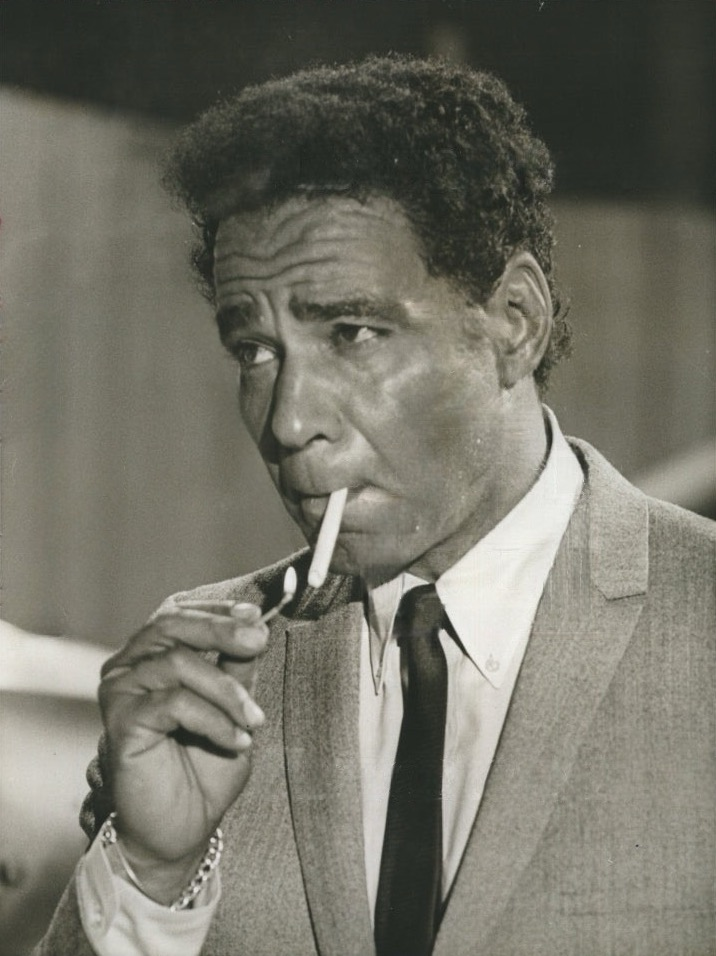
- Hamilton in Ironside, 1967
- Born: Bernard Hamilton; June 12, 1928; East Los Angeles, California, U.S.
- Died: December 30, 2008 (aged 80); Los Angeles, California, U.S.
- Resting place: Riverside National Cemetery, Riverside, California
- Occupation: Actor
- Years active: 1950–1985

Bernard Hamilton (June 12, 1928 – December 30, 2008) was an American actor. He is best known as Captain Dobey in Starsky & Hutch (1975–1979).

== Biography ==
Hamilton was born in East Los Angeles; his brother was jazz drummer Chico Hamilton. He attended Oakland Technical High School, where he first became interested in acting. In films from 1950, he labored in bit roles for years before getting noticed in the film One Potato, Two Potato (1964), the story of an interracial marriage. He is best remembered for his role as the brusque, no-nonsense Captain Dobey in the United States 1970s police series Starsky & Hutch.

After Starsky and Hutch, Hamilton by and large quit acting, playing in only four roles, his last role being an episode of The Love Boat in 1985. Instead, he went into the music business, producing R&B and gospel records.

Hamilton was also an impresario; starting in the late 1960s he ran a nightclub/art gallery called Citadel d’Haiti on Sunset Boulevard. Hamilton also produced rhythm and blues and gospel music recordings on his own record label called Chocolate Snowman. One of his releases featured himself; it was entitled Captain Dobey Sings the Blues.

Hamilton married Maxine King on December 7, 1950, they divorced in 1968 after having two children, son Raoul and daughter Candy.

Hamilton died on December 30, 2008, of cardiac arrest at the age of 80. A US Army veteran in the Korean War, he was buried at Riverside National Cemetery in Riverside, California.

== Selected filmography ==
Selected filmography of Bernie Hamilton
Year	Title	Role	Notes
1950	The Jackie Robinson Story	Ernie	
1951	Bright Victory	Soldier	Uncredited
1951	The Harlem Globetrotters	Higgins	Uncredited
1951	Mysterious Island	Neb	
1954	Jungle Man-Eaters	Zuwaba	
1954	Carmen Jones	Reporter	Uncredited
1955	Kismet	Pearl Merchant	Uncredited
1956	Congo Crossing	Pompala	
1956	The Girl He Left Behind	Corporal West	Uncredited
1959	Up Periscope	Weary	Uncredited
1959	Cry Tough	Policeman	Uncredited
1959	Take a Giant Step	Sharpie in Bar	Uncredited
1960	Alfred Hitchcock Presents	Dawson	Season 6 Episode 1: "Mrs. Bixby and the Colonel's Coat"
1960	The Young One	Traver	Directed by Luis Buñuel
1960	Let No Man Write My Epitaph	Goodbye George	
1961	Underworld U.S.A.	Investigator	Uncredited
1961	The Devil at 4 O'Clock	Charlie	
1961	The Law and Mr Jones	Bob Mills	"Lethal Weapons"
1962	13 West Street	Negro	
1963	Captain Sindbad	Quinius	
1964	The Alfred Hitchcock Hour	Second Convict	Season 2 Episode 18: "Final Escape"
1964	One Potato, Two Potato	Frank Richards	
1965	Synanon	Pete	
1967	Stranger on the Run	Dickory	
1968	The Swimmer	Chauffeur	
1969	The Lost Man	Reggie Page	
1970	Nam's Angels	Captain Jackson	
1970	Walk the Walk	Mike	
1971	The Organization	Lieutenant Jessop	
1972	Hammer	Davis	
1973	Scream Blacula Scream	Ragman	
1975	Bucktown	Harley	
1980	Battlestar Galactica 1980	Police Chief	Season 1 Episode 8: "The night the Cylons Landed Pt 2"
