= Boyd "Red" Morgan =

American football player and actor (1915–1988)

Boyd Morgan
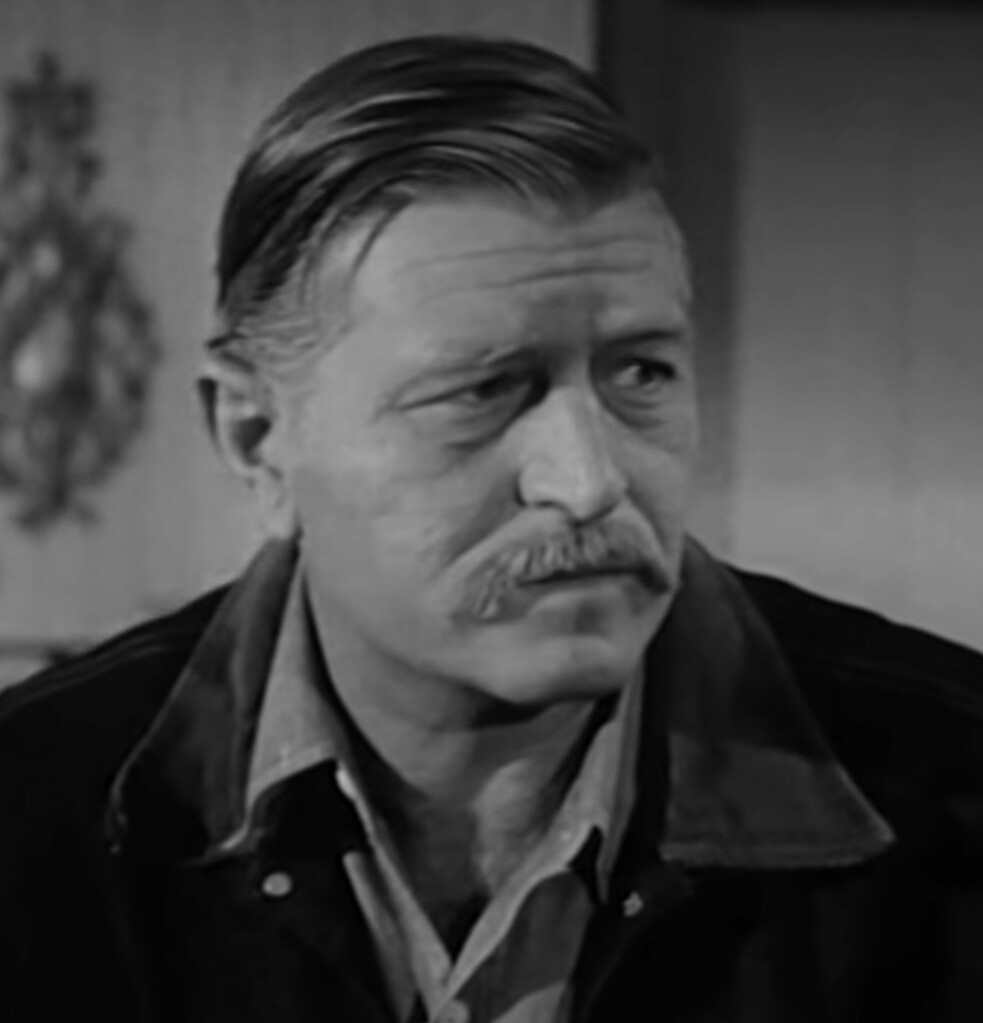
- Morgan in The Amazing Transparent Man (1960)
- Born: Boyd Franklin Morgan; October 24, 1915; Comanche, Oklahoma, U.S
- Died: January 8, 1988 (aged 72); Tarzana, California, U.S.
- Education: University of Southern California
- Occupations: Football running back; actor
- Years active: 1936–1987

Boyd Franklin Morgan (October 24, 1915 – January 8, 1988) was an American football running back in the National Football League (NFL) for the Washington Redskins. He played college football at the University of Southern California and was drafted in the 18th round of the 1939 NFL draft.

After World War II service as a Naval pilot, he became a prolific stuntman and actor in Hollywood, best known for appearing in The Amazing Transparent Man (1960).

== Selected filmography ==
- Smoky Canyon (1952)
- Laramie Mountains (1952)
- The Last Musketeer (1952)
- Beyond the Time Barrier (1960) - Captain
- Perry Mason (1961) - Muscleman
- The War Wagon (1967)
- The Stalking Moon (1968) - Stage Driver Shelby
- Support Your Local Sheriff! (1969) - Street Brawler (uncredited)
- True Grit (1969) - Red - Ferryman (uncredited)
- Alex in Wonderland (1970) - Photographer on Set (uncredited)
- Gunsmoke (1970-1972)
  - "Captain Sligo" (S16E16) - Tanner
  - "My Brother's Keeper" (S17E10) - Kroll
  - "The River" (S18E1-E2) - Suggs
- The Cheyenne Social Club (1970) - Hansen
- There Was a Crooked Man... (1970) - Hobbs (uncredited)
- Rio Lobo (1970) - Train Engineer (uncredited)
- Zabriskie Point (1970) - Policeman (uncredited)
- Wild Rovers (1971) - Sheepman
- Santee (1973) - Stagecoach Driver
- Blazing Saddles (1974) - Outlaw #3 (uncredited)
- Foxy Brown (1974) - Slauson
- Gone with the West (1974) - Mimmo's Men
- Evil Town (1977) - Vernon Patterson
