= Studio 10,001 Inc. =

Studio 10,001 was an international film studio formed in 1963 by exploitation filmmaker Kroger Babb. With a headquarters in Beverly Hills, California, it had a presence in the United States, Europe, New Zealand, and Australia and presented such films as Kipling's Women and the Rue McClanahan film Five Minutes to Love.
