= Darlene Tompkins =

American actress (1940–2019)

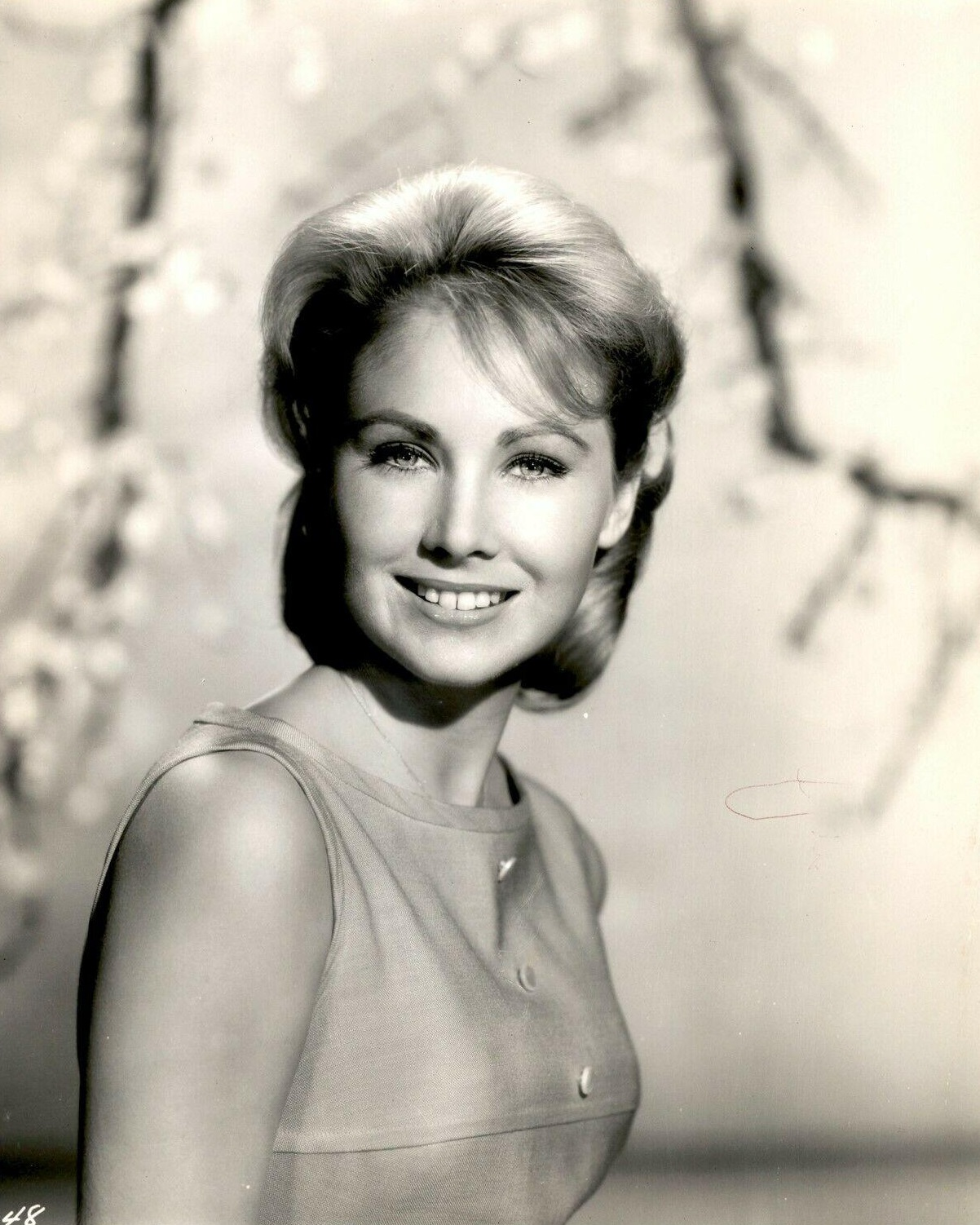
- Tompkins in Blue Hawaii (1961)
- Born: November 16, 1940; Chicago, Illinois
- Died: July 18, 2019 (aged 78)
- Occupation: Actress
- Relatives: Beverly Washburn (aunt)

Darlene Tompkins (born Darlene Perfect; November 16, 1940 – July 18, 2019) was an American actress.

== Biography ==
Tompkins was born in Chicago, Illinois on November 16, 1940. Her parents were divorced when she reached the age of five and she took the surname of her stepfather. Her family performed in plays and vaudeville, and she had an early goal to be a Hollywood actress. At the age of twelve she was mauled by a dog which left her very self-conscious: "I got my chest scarred up from that. I always wore blouses and sweatshirts to cover myself." To help overcome her shyness, she was entered into beauty contests by her mother. Her subsequent beauty pageant victories attracted some attention and she started modelling and appeared in commercials.

Her first acting role was in Beyond the Time Barrier (1960). She then co-starred opposite Elvis Presley in Blue Hawaii (1961). She had a role in My Six Loves (1963) and played parts in several television shows.

Her career was interrupted by her marriage to Larry McFall; they had two sons. She tried to resume acting again when their marriage ended in 1974, but by then she was in her thirties and had difficulty landing roles. After that she worked as an extra and stand-in. She also did stuntwork in Charlie's Angels and Starsky & Hutch. In 1983 she married Walter F Kightly and retired from acting, but was a regular at Elvis film festivals and conventions.

Tompkins and Kightly divorced in 2001 and Tompkins married for a third time in 2003. After suffering complications following a stroke, Tompkins was taken off life support and died on July 18, 2019. She was survived by her third husband and sons.

== Filmography ==
Year	Title	Role	Notes
1960	Wake Me When It's Over	Girl in Bikini	Uncredited
1960	Beyond the Time Barrier	Princess Trirene	
1961	Alfred Hitchcock Presents	Tim's Girlfriend	Season Episode 25: "Museum Piece"
1961	Sea Hunt	Ginny, Chan's Girlfriend	Season 4 Episode 9: "Hot Tracer"
1961	The Ladies Man	Working Girl	Uncredited
1961	Blue Hawaii	Patsy Simon	
1963	My Six Loves	Ava Johnson	
1963	Fun in Acapulco	Miss Stevers	Uncredited
1964	Wendy and Me	June	Season 1 Episode 5: "George Burns While Rome Fiddles"
1967	A Guide for the Married Man	Bosomy Blonde	Uncredited, (final film role)
