= Willa Pearl Curtis =

American actress (1896–1970)

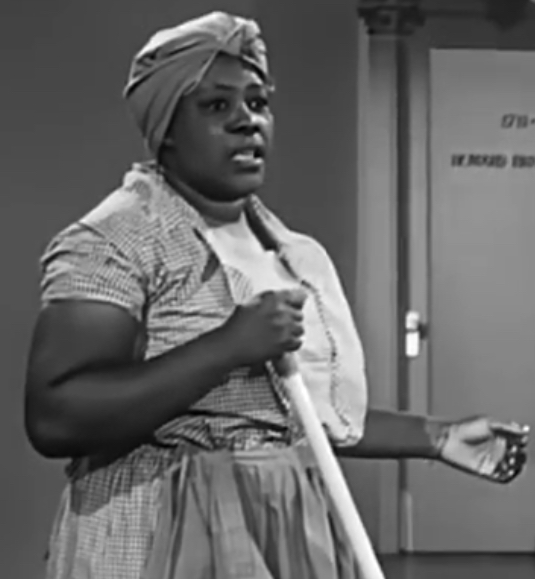
- Curtis in Second Chorus (1940)
- Born: March 21, 1896; Texas, U.S.
- Died: December 19, 1970 (aged 74); Los Angeles, California, U.S.
- Resting place: Lincoln Memorial Park, Carson, California
- Other names: Willa Curtis, Willie Pearl Curtis
- Occupation(s): Actress, singer
- Years active: 1938–1964

Willa Pearl Curtis (March 21, 1896 – December 19, 1970) was an American actress in film and television. She was active in the Negro Motion Picture Players Association in Los Angeles.

== Biography ==
Curtis started as a performer in theater and music in Texas. When Curtis first arrived in Los Angeles, she worked as a maid to a stage actress. Like many black actresses of her generation, Curtis was often cast as a maid or cook, often uncredited bit parts, in films during the 1930s, 1940s, and 1950s. Her credited appearances included roles in The Wages of Sin (1938), Second Chorus (1940), Mom and Dad (1945), The Lawton Story (1949), Native Son (1951), Oiltown, U.S.A. (1953), and Queen Bee (1955). Among her many uncredited roles, she appeared with Our Gang in Unexpected Riches (1942) and Tale of a Dog (1944), and clowned with Shemp Howard in Pick a Peck of Plumbers (1944).

On television, Curtis appeared in episodes of Death Valley Days (1953), The Life of Riley (1953), The Amos 'n Andy Show (1951, 1953, 1955), Four Star Playhouse (1955), Stories of the Century (1955), Cavalcade of America (1955), The Adventures of Jim Bowie (1957), Wide Country (1963), The Alfred Hitchcock Hour (1963), and Ben Casey (1964).

Curtis was active in the Negro Motion Picture Players Association in Los Angeles. She also worked as a singer with fellow Amos 'n Andy performer Jester Hairston, and headed the concert committee of the historic First A. M. E. Church in Los Angeles.

Curtis died in Los Angeles in 1970, aged 74 years. Her gravesite is in Lincoln Memorial Park in Carson, California.

== Selected filmography ==
- The Alfred Hitchcock Hour (1963) (Season 1 Episode 23: "The Lonely Hours") as Katie (credited as Hassie)
