= Beverly Washburn =

American actress (born 1943)

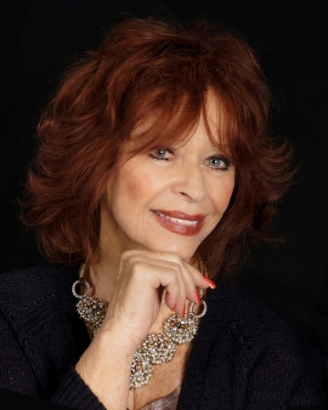
- Beverly Washburn in 2014
- Born: November 25, 1943 (age 82); Los Angeles, California, U.S.
- Occupation: Actress
- Years active: 1950–present
- Spouse: Michael Radell
- Relatives: Darlene Tompkins (niece)

Beverly Washburn (born November 25, 1943) is an American actress. She is best known for her roles in the Walt Disney drama Old Yeller (1957) and the American General Pictures horror Spider Baby (1967).

== Early years ==
Washburn was born in Los Angeles, California, on November 25, 1943, the daughter of Mr. and Mrs. Howard Washburn of Hollywood. She is the aunt of actress Darlene Tompkins, as well as the sister of actress Audrey Allen.

== Career ==
Washburn began her career as a child actor, when she was three years old, appearing in The Killer That Stalked New York (1950) and Frank Capra's Here Comes the Groom (1951). Her subsequent film credits included a supporting role in the Walt Disney feature Old Yeller (1957); she is the last surviving cast member. By age 16, she had appeared in 10 films and more than 500 television programs.

On television, Washburn portrayed Kathryn "Kit" Wilson, on Professional Father, Shirley Mitchell on Gidget, and Vickie Massey on The New Loretta Young Show. She was also seen regularly on A Letter to Loretta and The Loretta Young Theater.

Washburn is the author of Reel Tears: The Beverly Washburn Story, Take Two, which BearManor Media re-released in 2013.

== Filmography ==
=== Film ===
Year	Title	Role	Notes	Ref.
1950	The Killer That Stalked New York	Walda Kowalski		
1951	Here Comes the Groom	Suzi		
1951	Superman and the Mole-Men	Child		
1952	Hans Christian Andersen	Little Girl Near Jailhouse	Uncredited	
1953	Shane	Ruth Lewis	Uncredited	
1953	The Juggler	Susy		
1956	The Lone Ranger	Lila Kilgore		
1957	Summer Love	Jackie Bronson		
1957	Old Yeller	Lisbeth Searcy		
1967	Spider Baby	Elizabeth		
1969	Pit Stop	Jolene		
2007	Hard Four	Brenda		
2016	White Paint	Darlene		
2024	Spider Baby, or The Maddest Story Ever Told	Meredith		

=== Partial television ===
Year	Title	Role	Notes	Ref.
1953	Adventures of Superman	Little Girl	Episodes: "The Unknown People" – Part 1	
1954	Cavalcade of America	Elizabeth	Episode: "Crazy Judah"	
1954	Dragnet	Ruthie Snyder	Episode: "The Big Pair"	
1955	Treasury Men in Action	Rita	Episode: "The Case of the Swindler's Gold"	
1955	Professional Father	Kit Wilson	18 episodes	
1956	Telephone Time	Laura Bridgman	Episode "The Key"	
1957	Father Knows Best	Mara	Episode: "The Spelling Bee"	
1957	Code 3	Nancy	Episode: "The Search"	
1958	Wagon Train	Midge	Episode: "The Tobias Jones Story"	
1958	The Texan	Henrietta "Hank" Tovers	Episode: "No Tears for the Dead"	
1959	Leave It To Beaver	Jill Bartlett	Episode: "Blind Date Committee"	
1959	One Step Beyond	Young Lisa Garrick	Episode: "Premonition"	
1961	Thriller	Lollie Harrod	Episode: "Parasite Mansion"	
1967	Star Trek	Lieutenant Arlene Galway	Episode: "The Deadly Years"	
1971	Getting Together	Janet	Episode: "The Great Pretender"	
1972	McMillan & Wife	Operator	Episode: "Terror Times Two"	
1977	Tales of the Unexpected	Dr. Kelty's Secretary	Episode: "No Way Out"	
1984	Scarecrow and Mrs. King	Buzz Blade Movie Actress	Episode: "Remembrance of Things Past"	
2003	Las Vegas	Mrs. Johnson	Pilot episode	

== Sources ==
- Lisanti, Tom (2015). Drive-in Dream Girls: A Galaxy of B-Movie Starlets of the Sixties. Jefferson, North Carolina: McFarland. ISBN 978-0-786-49342-5.
