= My Six Loves =

1963 film by Gower Champion

- 1963 theatrical poster
- Directed by: Gower Champion
- Written by: Peter Funk (novel); Joseph Calvelli; John Fante; William Wood
- Produced by: Gant Gaither
- Starring: Debbie Reynolds; Cliff Robertson
- Cinematography: Arthur E. Arling
- Edited by: John Woodcock
- Music by: Walter Scharf
- Production company: Paramount Pictures
- Distributed by: Paramount Pictures
- Release date: April 3, 1963
- Running time: 101 minutes
- Country: United States
- Language: English
- Box office: $2,185,000 (US/ Canada)

My Six Loves is a 1963 comedy film in Technicolor starring Debbie Reynolds as a Broadway star who takes a vacation and finds herself responsible for six abandoned children, in Gower Champion's directorial debut. It is based on the novel of the same name by Peter Funk.

== Plot ==
Janice Courtney is a big success on Broadway, but the busy actress collapses from exhaustion. A doctor orders her to return to her Connecticut home for a long rest.

In a shack on her property, Janice discovers six children and a large dog, abandoned and living on their own. Taking them in, Janice takes care of the kids with the help of housekeeper Ethel and a local minister, Jim Larkin. Being a mother appeals to her, but when producer Marty Bliss persuades her to resume her career, Janice returns to New York to begin a new play.

Meanwhile, Janice is falling in love with the local minister, Rev, Jim Larkin.

Everything changes when one of the children (Sonny) is placed in a hospital but runs away. Jim tries to contact Janice but cannot get through Marty's reception as they have been told to ignore his calls. Eventually he storms in, in person. A frantic Janice leaves the play, and when the child is finally found, realizes that this is the life she wants, which she intends to share with Jim. Little Sonny, who has never previously spoken, confirms all with Jim's favourite term: "absolutely".

== Cast ==
- Debbie Reynolds as Janice Courtney
- Cliff Robertson as Reverend Jim Larkin
- David Janssen as Marty Bliss
- Eileen Heckart as Ethel
- Hans Conried as Kinsley Kross
- Mary McCarty as Doreen Smith
- John McGiver as Judge Harris
- Max Showalter as B. J. Smith
- Alice Ghostley as Selena Johnson
- Alice Pearce as Bus Driver
- Pippa Scott as Dianne Soper
- Claude Stroud as Dr. Miller
- Darlene Tompkins as Darlene Smith
- Leon Belasco as Mario
- Billy E. Hughes as Leo
- Jim Backus as Sheriff
- Barry Livingston as Sherman Smith
- Colleen Peters as Amy
- Sally Smith as Brenda
- Debbie Price as Dulcie
- Teddy Eccles as Sonny
- Sterling Holloway as Oliver Dodds

== See also ==
- List of American films of 1963
