= Kroger Babb =

American film and TV producer (1906–1980)

- 1933, from the Academy of Motion Picture Arts and Sciences Library
- Born: December 30, 1906; Lees Creek, Ohio, U.S.
- Died: January 28, 1980 (aged 73); Palm Springs, California, U.S.
- Occupation: Film producer
- Years active: 1938–1977
- Spouse: Mildred Horn

Howard W. "Kroger" Babb (December 30, 1906 – January 28, 1980) was an American film producer and showman. His marketing techniques were similar to a travelling salesman's, with roots in the medicine show tradition. Self-described as "America's Fearless Young Showman", he is best known for his presentation of the 1945 exploitation film Mom and Dad, which was added to the National Film Registry of the Library of Congress in 2005.

Babb was involved in the production and marketing of many films and television shows, promoting each according to his favorite marketing motto: "You gotta tell 'em to sell 'em." His films ranged from sex education-style dramas to "documentaries" on foreign cultures, intended to titillate audiences rather than to educate them, maximizing profits via marketing gimmicks.

== Youth ==
Babb was born in 1906 in Lees Creek, Ohio. He earned the nickname "Kroger" either from his childhood job at the grocer of the same name or from his father's preference for B.H. Kroger coffee. Babb held a number of jobs during his youth, gaining a mention in Ripley's Believe It Or Not for refereeing a record number of youth sports games. He started out with jobs in sportswriting and reporting at a local newspaper in his 20s, and even showed signs of his later work while showcasing "Digger" O'Dell, the "living corpse", but first achieved success after his promotion to publicity manager for the Chakeres-Warners movie theaters, where he would create different kinds of stunts to lure audiences—for example, a drawing to award two bags of groceries to one ticket holder at selected theaters.

In the early 1940s Babb joined Cox and Underwood, a company that obtained the rights to poorly made or otherwise unmarketable films of subjects that were potentially controversial or shocking. It would often remove entire sections of these films and add material such as medical reels that lent itself to sensational promotion. Babb went on the road with a Cox and Underwood concoction titled Dust to Dust, a reworking of High School Girl with a childbirth scene added to the end. Its profits allowed Cox and Underwood to retire from the business, leaving Babb to start his own company, Hygienic Productions. He opened it near his childhood home in Wilmington, Ohio, and hired booking agents and advance salesmen along with out-of-work actors and comedians to present repackaged films and new features.

== Film promotion ==
A pressbook Babb sent to theaters in advance of Mom and Dad, with cast information, newspaper reviews, photos and other promotional material

Babb is best known for his presentation of exploitation films, a term many in the business would embrace. According to The Hollywood Reporter, his success came from picking topics that would be easily sensationalized, such as religion and sex. His expenses were estimated at 5% for selling, and his distribution overhead near 7%, resulting in some of the largest per-dollar returns in the film industry.

Babb's biggest success was Mom and Dad, which he conceived and produced and which William Beaudine directed in six days. Babb headed the promotion of this film following its premiere in early 1945, often going on the road with it himself. The film, a morality tale about a young girl who becomes pregnant and struggles to find someone to turn to, cost $62,000 and over 300 prints were struck and sent to theaters all over the country, with a "presenter"—later known as an advance man—and the presenter would stir up his own controversy in the weeks preceding the film's arrival by writing protest letters to local churches and newspapers and fabricating letters from the mayors of nearby cities relating tales of young women encouraged by the film to discuss similar predicaments.

The third highest-grossing film of its decade, Mom and Dad was claimed by Babb to have made $63,000 for every $1,000 the original investors contributed, and the Los Angeles Times estimated that it grossed anywhere from $40 million to $100 million. Its success spawned a number of imitations, such as Street Corner and The Story of Bob and Sally, that eventually flooded the market, but it was still being shown around the world decades later and ultimately was added to the National Film Registry in 2005.

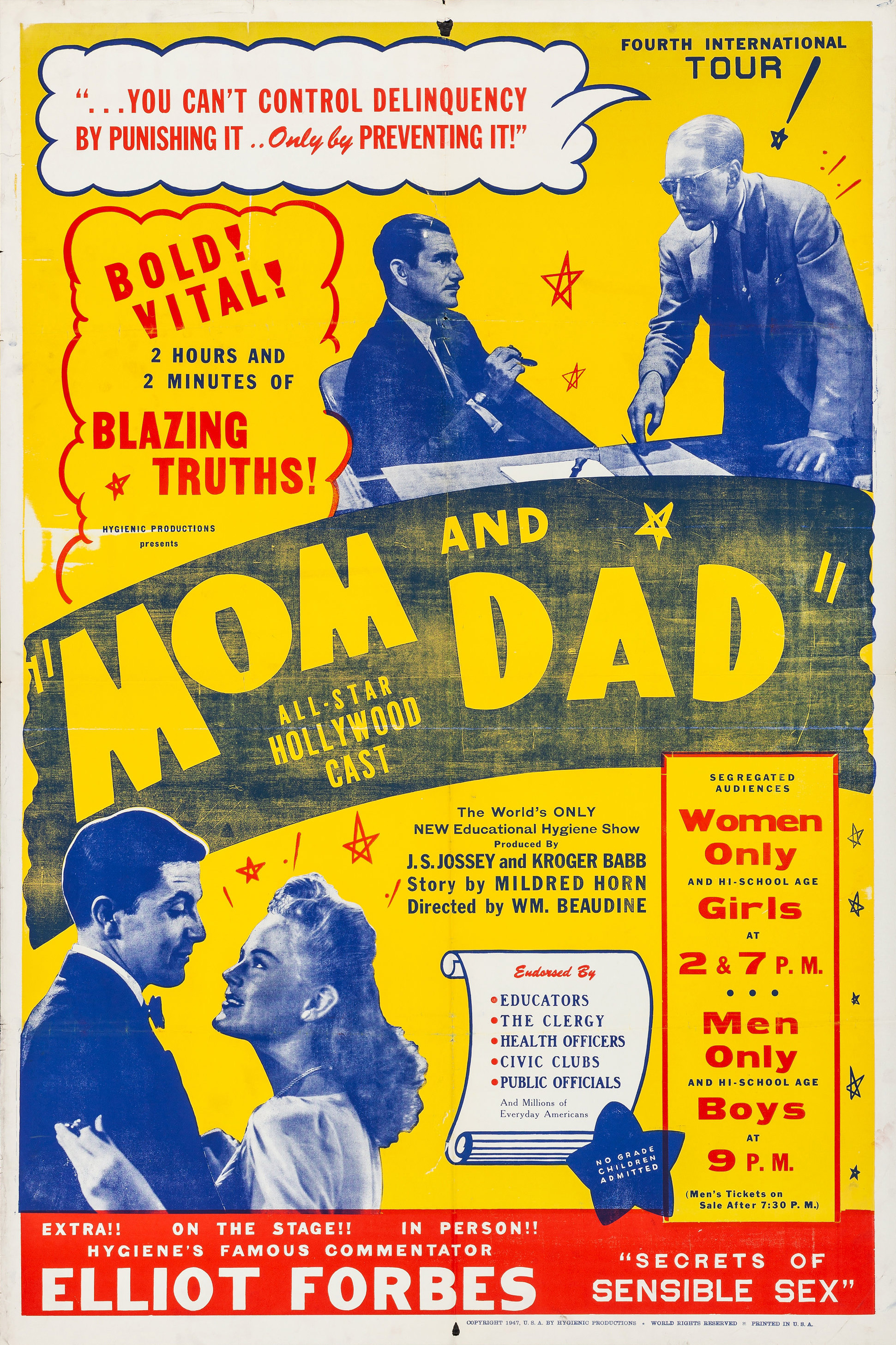
Poster for Babb's production of Mom and Dad, showing some of the rhetorical devices Babb would use to stir up controversy

The success of Mom and Dad was mostly due to Babb's marketing strategy of overwhelming a small town with ads and generating controversy. Eric Schaefer explains:

Acknowledging that his films were unknown quantities, Babb advocated a "100% saturation campaign". In his sample situation--The Deadwood Theater in Movie-hater, Missouri, with a potential audience base of twenty-four thousand--Babb suggested sending tabloid heralds to all seven thousand homes in the area at a cost of $196, spending $65 for newspaper ads, $50 on radio, plus an additional $65 for three hundred window cards, hand-out teaser cards, pennants, and posters. The total came to almost $400, or the same amount the theater owner would normally spend on advertising in the course of an entire month. Babb always claimed that with his formula the profit would outweigh the investment...

The film became so ubiquitous that Time said its presentation "left only the livestock unaware of the chance to learn the facts of life". Babb also made sure that each showing of the film followed a similar format: adults-only screenings segregated by gender, and live lectures by "Fearless Hygiene Commentator Elliot Forbes" during an intermission. At any one time, hundreds of Elliot Forbeses would be giving a lecture at the same time in a variety of locations. (in some predominantly African-American areas, Olympic gold medalist Jesse Owens appeared instead, a trend he'd continue with films like "She Shoulda Said 'No'!") According to entertainer Card Mondor, an Elliot Forbes in the 1940s who later purchased the Australian and New Zealand rights for Mom and Dad, the Forbeses were "mostly local men (from Wilmington, Ohio) who were trained to give the lecture . . . [I]t was a cross-section of the male population, mostly clean-cut young guys . . . The whole concept would have never worked with a trashy look."

During the intermission and after the showing, books relevant to the subject of the film were sold. Mom and Dad's distributor Modern Film Distributors sold over 45,000 copies of Man and Boy and Woman and Girl, written by Babb's wife, netting an estimated $31,000. According to Babb, these cost about eight cents to produce, and were sold for $1 apiece. While Modern Film was able to sell 45,000 on its own, Babb estimates sales of 40 million, citing "IRS figures." This sort of companion selling would become common practice for Babb: with the religious film The Lawton Story (AKA-Prince of Peace), he would sell Bibles and other spiritual literature; and with his fidelity film Why Men Leave Home books featuring beauty tips.

With other films, Babb would try different approaches. For She Shoulda Said No!, an anti-marijuana film of the 1950s, he highlighted the sexual scenes and arranged "one-time-only" midnight showings, claiming that his company was working with the United States Treasury Department to release the film "in as many towns and cities as possible in the shortest possible length of time" as a public service. David F. Friedman, another successful exploitation filmmaker of the era, has attributed the "one-time-only" distribution to a quality so low that Babb wanted to cash in and move to his next stop as fast as possible. At each showing of a film, a singing of "The Star-Spangled Banner" was also required.

As well as being at the forefront of the battles over censorship and the motion picture censorship system, the exploitation genre faced numerous challenges during the 1940s and 1950s. It was estimated that Babb was sued over 400 times just for Mom and Dad (Babb himself claimed 428). He would often use the supposed educational value of the films as a defense, also recommending it to theater owners; in his pressbook for Karamoja, he wrote, "When a stupid jerk tries to outsmart proven facts, he should be in an asylum, not a theater."

Despite the criticism that Babb drew for Mom and Dad, in 1951 he received the first annual Sid Grauman Showmanship Award, presented by the Hollywood Rotary Club in honor of his accomplishments over the years.

== Later films ==
Following the success of Mom and Dad, Babb renamed his company Hallmark Productions, continuing the marketing approaches of Hygienic Productions while going beyond health and sex education films. He would later set up a larger distribution company, named Hallmark's Big-6.

Babb cheaply acquired the rights to what would become "She Shoulda Said No!" shortly after Robert Mitchum and Lila Leeds were arrested for marijuana use. Its original producer had struggled to get it distributed as Wild Weed, and Babb quickly presented it as The Story of Lila Leeds and Her Exposé of the Marijuana Racket, hoping that the title would draw audiences. When it failed to stir up much interest, Babb instead focused on the one scene of female nudity, using a photo of Leeds in a showgirl outfit, and retitled it "She Shoulda Said 'No'!", with taglines such as "How Bad Can a Good Girl Get . . . without losing her virtue or respect???" According to Friedman, Babb's midnight presentation of the film twice a week made more money than any other film at the same theater would earn over a full run; Friedman proceeded to use the film in his own roadshow double features.

Babb's associates agreed with his belief that "Nothing's hopeless if it's advertised right", stating that he "could take any piece of junk and sell it". One film Babb presented in the 1950s was centered on an annual passion play and the story behind putting it on, filmed in 1948 in Lawton, Oklahoma. Initially called The Lawton Story and filmed in Cinecolor, the film was so cheaply, shoddily and quickly made that telephone poles could be seen behind the crucifix. Its cast consisted of local non-professionals whose Oklahoma twangs were so thick that all of their lines had to re-recorded by professional voice-over actors; upon release, one reviewer described it as "the only film that had to be dubbed from English to English". In addition to re-dubbing it, Babb re-edited and re-titled it The Prince of Peace; it was so successful that the New York Daily News called it "the Miracle of Broadway".

Another film, Karamoja, was marketed as a shocking portrayal of a tribe from Uganda who wore "only the wind and live[d] on blood and beer". Scenes included "the bleeding of cattle and drinking of the warm blood, and self-mutilation as a form of ornamentation", as well as a full-color circumcision scene. Karamoja proved less controversial than many of Babb's other films and grossed less.

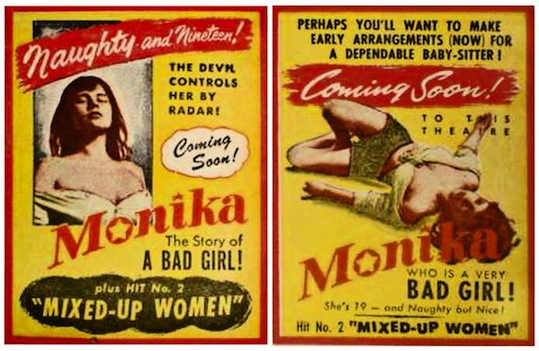
Two small promotional flyers for Babb's Monika, the Story of a Bad Girl, focusing on sexual aspects to draw audiences

Babb never repeated the overwhelming success of Mom and Dad, and he followed much of the exploitation industry in turning to burlesque features in an attempt to make more money. One notorious attempt was his acquisition of the American theatrical rights for Ingmar Bergman's Sommaren med Monika (Summer with Monika). About one-third of the film was cut, and the remaining 62 minutes emphasized nudity by retaining a skinny-dipping scene; the result was titled Monika, the Story of a Bad Girl. Suggestive advertising art, including promotional postcards, portrayed the nude rear of Harriet Andersson.

Babb's final film was his presentation of a European version of Harriet Beecher Stowe's book Uncle Tom's Cabin. This was described by Friedman as one of the most "unintentionally funny exploitation films ever made", filled with "second-rate Italian actors who could barely speak English".

== Other ventures ==
After the success of Mom and Dad, Babb talked of an "unrealized" project called Father Bingo, which he advertised in BoxOffice magazine as "An Exposé of Gambling in the Parish Halls" and described as a comedy with an anti-gambling message about a corrupt priest who runs a "controlled" bingo night at his parish. Babb called it "the best 'snow-job' of my life", and it has been speculated that he never intended to make it, despite the trade ads that appeared for years.

Babb was involved with many film production companies along with his own, including Southwestern Productions. On the strength of his past successes, Babb joined John Miller's film production company, Miller-Consolidated Pictures, as vice president and general manager in 1959. Babb advocated the use of the hard-selling technique he had perfected as a presenter: "selling the sizzle instead of the steak", according to an interview. He wrote a column for BoxOffice at the same time. His personal anecdotes provided advice for selling films, such as writing off expenses as tax deductions, and using women's clubs to expand advertising and revenues cheaply. He noted that there were "over 30,000 women's clubs", and that "practically every women's club has a 16mm projector".

In 1963 Babb formed another distribution company, Studio 10,001. Operating in Beverly Hills (and claiming representation in Canada, Japan, Australia, and New Zealand), it used similar roadshow techniques to market television programs such as The Ern Westmore Show. Babb also acted as a showman for hire, promoting others' films when not working on his own. Among them was a nudie-cutie picture titled Kipling's Women, a peep show, and Five Minutes to Love, a reworking of a Rue McClanahan film.

Babb began creating promotion kits entitled "Who's Got the Ball?" in an attempt to teach his craft to would-be presenters. Marketing himself as "MR. PIHSNAMWOHS" ("showmanship" backwards), he advertised in BoxOffice. He also dabbled in other areas, writing tirades against pay television and creating a pyramid scheme titled "The Idea Factory". One of his schemes was the "Astounding Swedish Ice Cream Diet": overweight throughout his life, Babb claimed to have eaten ice cream three times a day, yet to have lost 100 pounds in 45 days.

== Personal life ==
Babb met Mildred Horn in 1944 during a showing of Dust to Dust in Indianapolis, where she was working as a movie critic; her review of the film called it a "cheap, mislabeled morality play", but the two struck up a conversation about it. They stayed together in a common-law marriage; Horn wrote a number of Babb's screenplays, including Mom and Dad, as well as companion books.

In November 1953 Babb was arrested on a drunk-driving charge after running a red traffic light and refusing a sobriety test. His $250 bail was continued, and he was not convicted, although this mishap to the recent creator of the anti-alcohol film One Too Many was widely covered in the press.

Babb had tax troubles in the years after his success with Mom and Dad. He suggested to the Press-Enterprise that his operation was so diffuse that sales of his one-dollar sex education pamphlets were too difficult to track accurately. Babb eventually sold the rights to Mom and Dad and his stake in Modern Film Distributors to Irwin Joseph and Floyd Lewis—former partners in Modern Film who would continue to showcase Mom and Dad across the United States.

Babb suffered from various ailments toward the end of his life, including a stroke. He retired in 1977, at 70, and died of heart failure (due to complications from diabetes) on January 29, 1980, in Palm Springs, California. His gravestone reads, "His many trips around and all over the world began in Centerville and end here in Lees Creek."

== Works ==
Babb worked in various areas of the entertainment industry, in both traditional and exploitation genres. He claimed to have made twenty films, and produced for television, radio, and even the stage. This is an incomplete collection of works owing to the nature of the exploitation genre. The titles are as they were finally presented by Babb, with earlier titles noted in parentheses.

=== As film producer ===
- Dust to Dust (1938)
- Mom and Dad (1945)
- The Lawton Story (1949)
- One Too Many (1951)
- Secrets of Beauty (1951)

=== As film writer ===
- One Too Many

=== As film distributor ===
- She Shoulda Said No! (previously Marijuana, the Devil's Weed, The Devil's Weed, Wild Weed, The Story of Lila Leeds and Her Exposé of the Marijuana Racket) (1949)
- Monika, the Story of a Bad Girl (original title Sommaren med Monika, later re-issued by others in full as Summer with Monika) (1949)
- Delinquent Angels (1951)
- The Best is Yet to Come (1951)
- Karamoja (1954)
- Kipling's Women (1961)
- Kwaheri (1961)
- Five Minutes to Love (previously The Rotten Apple, It Only Takes Five Minutes) (1963)
- Uncle Tom's Cabin (1970) originally released in Europe in 1965
- Redheads vs. Blondes (undated)

=== Television ===
- The Ern Westmore Hollywood Glamour Show, producer (1953)

=== Stage ===
- French Follies
