= She Shoulda Said No! =

1949 film by Sam Newfield

She Shoulda Said 'No'!
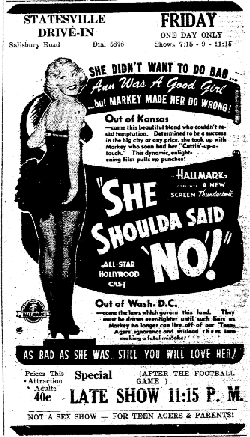
- Directed by: Sam Newfield
- Screenplay by: Richard H. Landau
- Story by: Arthur Hoerl
- Produced by: Kroger Babb
- Starring: Alan Baxter; Lyle Talbot; Lila Leeds; Michael Whalen; David Holt
- Narrated by: Knox Manning
- Cinematography: Jack Greenhalgh
- Edited by: Richard C. Currier; Seth Larsen
- Music by: Raoul Kraushaar
- Distributed by: Hygienic Productions; Modern Film Distributors
- Release date: July 15, 1949 (Chicago)
- Running time: 70 minutes
- Country: United States
- Language: English

She Shoulda Said 'No'! (also known as Wild Weed; The Devil's Weed; Marijuana, the Devil's Weed; and The Story of Lila Leeds and Her Exposé of the Marijuana Racket) is a 1949 exploitation film that follows in the spirit of morality tales such as the 1936 films Reefer Madness and Marihuana. Directed by Sam Newfield (using the pseudonym "Sherman Scott") and starring Lila Leeds, it was originally produced to capitalize on the arrest of Leeds and Robert Mitchum on a charge of marijuana conspiracy.

The film was issued under many titles; it struggled to find a distributor until film presenter Kroger Babb picked up the rights, reissuing it as The Story of Lila Leeds and Her Exposé of the Marijuana Racket. Its relative success came only after the promotional posters were redone and a story fabricated that the film was being presented in conjunction with the United States Treasury.

== Plot ==
She Shoulda Said No! (1949)

Leeds' character is "Anne Lester", a young orphan trying to pay for her brother's college education. After meeting Markey, a drug dealer, Anne begins to believe that she must smoke marijuana to fit in with her friends. She then goes to a "tea party", where she tries the drug for the first time. She is unaffected by the initial experiment, and loses her fear of drugs as she continues to use it willingly.

Anne's drug use results in the loss of many of her inhibitions, and the film shows her actions under the influence, including scenes implying sexual promiscuity. As the film progresses, she is fired from her job and begins selling drugs for Markey. Her brother hangs himself when he learns of her new job, and she is arrested and given a tour of the various psychiatric wards and jails in which drug users end up. Finally, after 50 days in jail, she is released, cleaned up and ready to cooperate with the authorities regarding Markey.

== Cast ==
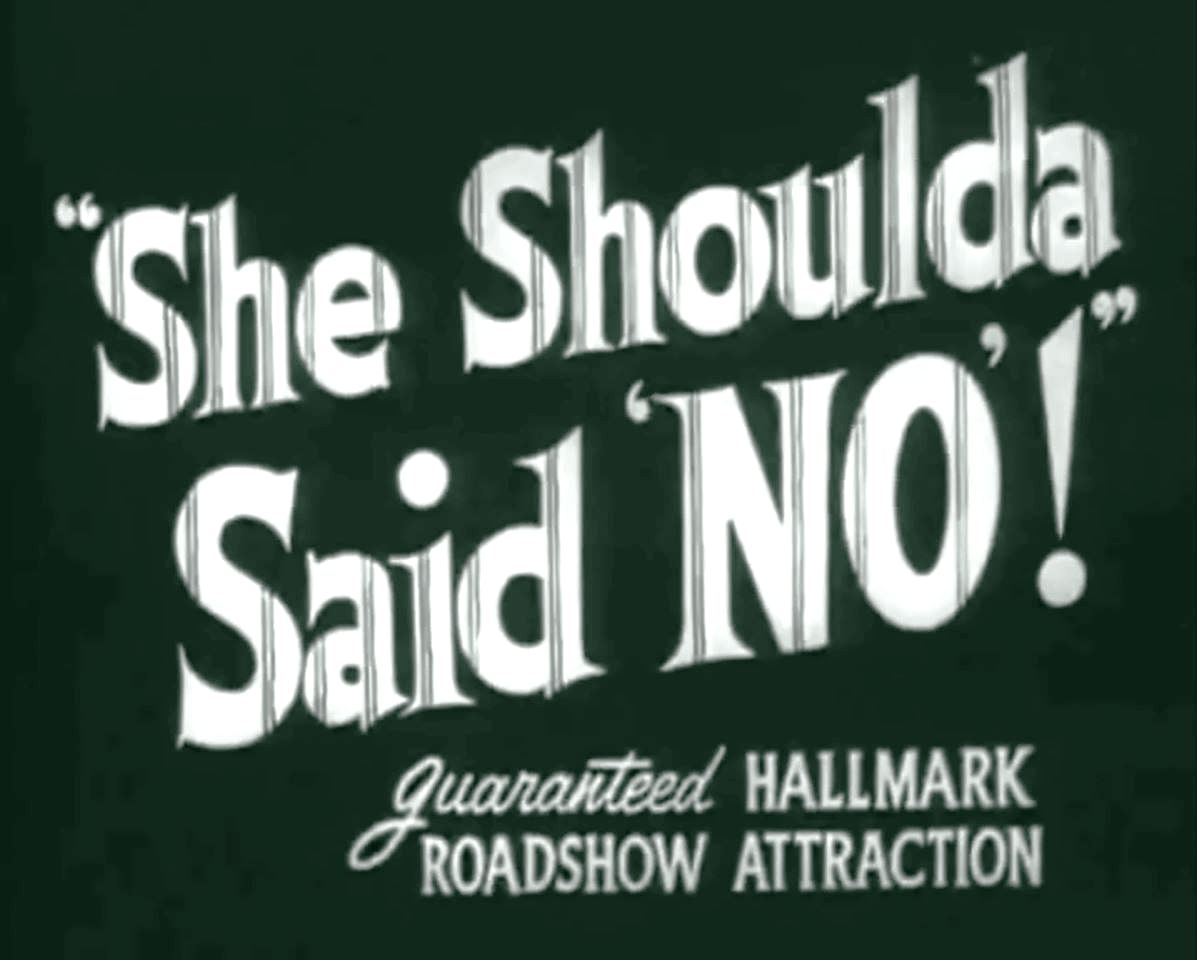
Screenshot of title card

- Alan Baxter as Markey
- Lyle Talbot as Captain Hayes
- Lila Leeds as Anne Lester
- Michael Whalen as Treanor
- Mary Ellen Popel as Rita
- Doug Blackley as Lieutenant Mason
- David Holt as Bob Lester
- Don Harvey as Lieutenant Tyne
- David Gorcey as Ricky
- Jack Elam as Raymond
- Dick Cogan as Edmunds
- Knox Manning as Narrator

== Production and marketing ==
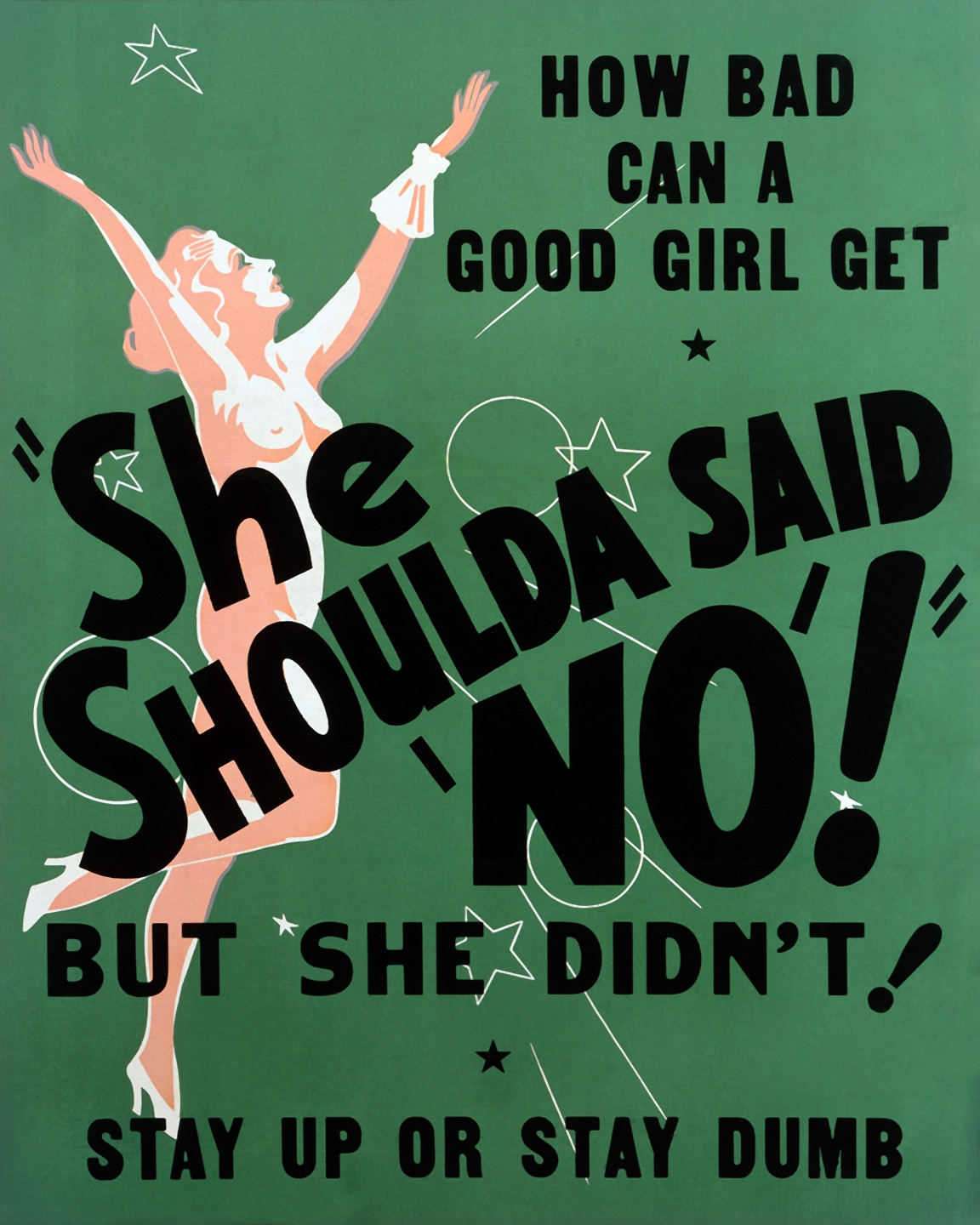
Theatrical poster to She Shoulda Said 'No'! (1949)

The film itself is semi-biographical, its story following what Leeds herself experienced. The film was inspired by the highly publicized arrest of movie stars Robert Mitchum and Leeds for marijuana possession. On September 1, 1948, the actors, along with two others, were arrested after being caught smoking marijuana at the home of Leeds in the early morning, and were charged with the felony of narcotics possession. Leeds was sentenced to sixty days in prison and placed on probation for five years.

Upon her release, Leeds struggled to find work in Hollywood, and signed on to star in Wild Weed. During publicity for the film in 1949, Leeds, who had been 20 at the time of the arrest, said that appearing in the picture would keep other people her age from trying drugs, but in 1952 she confided in Collier's that she "only had one offer… which was an obvious attempt to capitalize on the Mitchum case notoriety. I took it. I was broke." The film gained approval from the Federal Bureau of Narcotics to use the drug references, a standard practice at the time even though the Bureau had no power to censor the films. The film used its plot to push many of the beliefs of the time: that drug-using youth would turn to crime and the theory of "marijuana as a gateway drug". The latter was a leading argument for drug prohibition during the era, and an argument that Leeds herself made, based on her own history with marijuana and heroin.

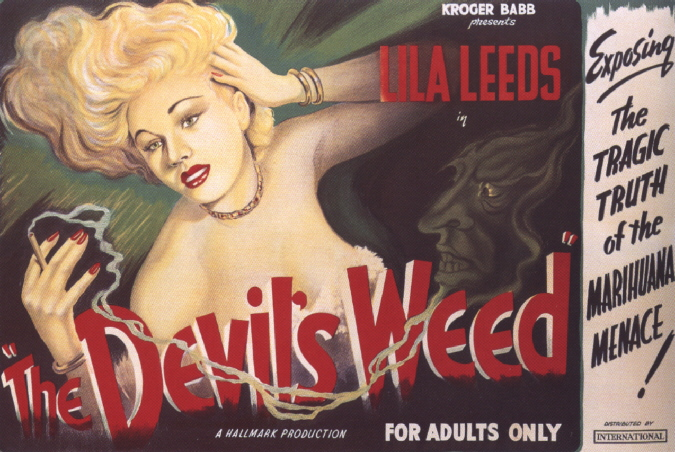
She Shoulda Said 'No'! released as The Devil's Weed

Via Franklin Productions, Kay filmed the production in six days, a common occurrence given that most films of the era were shot with a quick turnaround. Eureka Productions initially distributed the film, but it struggled to find an audience until Kroger Babb's Hallmark Productions acquired the rights for distribution. Babb initially marketed the film under the title The Story of Lila Leeds and Her Exposé of the Marijuana Racket, but failed to achieve success with that title and eventually changed it to "She Shoulda Said 'No'!". He pushed the sensuality of Leeds with new promotional photographs and a new tagline: "How Bad Can a Good Girl Get... without losing her virtue or respect???", while sending letters to local communities falsely claiming that the United States Treasury Department implored Hallmark to release the film "in as many towns and cities as possible in the shortest possible length of time" as a public service. The square-up misleadingly stated that the producers wished to "publicly acknowledge the splendid cooperation of the Nation's narcotic experts and Government departments, who aided in various ways the success of this production…. If its presentation saves but one young girl or boy from becoming a 'dope fiend' – then its story has been well told."

Babb, who gained notoriety for his various marketing gimmicks, occasionally had Leeds make appearances and give lectures at showings of the film. Babb often booked the movie as a midnight presentation twice a week in the same town; David F. Friedman, who would later use the film in his own double-billings, attributed the distribution plan to a film that was so low in quality that Babb wanted to cash in and move to his next stop as fast as possible.

== Release ==
The film had its premiere on July 15, 1949 at the Rialto in Chicago.

== Reception ==
According to Friedman, Babb's presentations of the film made more money than any other film the same theater would showcase over a typical film's full booking. While actual dollar figures are not available because of the nature of the genre (which was known for poor record keeping and unconventional distribution practices), the general financial success of "She Shoulda Said 'No'!" prompted producers, in 1951, to import a similar film from Argentina titled The Marihuana Story. That film, about a doctor who goes undercover into the world of drug addicts to learn about his wife's death only to become addicted to marijuana himself, was not as successful as other exploitation-style efforts as the public was more concerned about drug use by younger people.

"She Shoulda Said 'No'!" was not well-received critically upon its initial release, with The New York Times saying, "Never did vice seem so devoid of enchantment." Production and distribution of drug films slowed considerably following the film's run until Frank Sinatra's The Man with the Golden Arm forced changes to the Production Code, which was a studio-based system which regulated various aspects of objectionable content in films.

The film achieved some attention due to its B movie status over the years, being featured in a number of film compilations while continuing to focus on the salacious material as a selling point. In 1993, a VHS version was released as part of "David Friedman's Roadshow Rarities", the twenty-ninth volume in the Something Weird video series. Alpha Video Distributors released the film on DVD in 2006.

== See also ==
- List of films in the public domain in the United States
