= Beyond the Time Barrier =

1960 film

- Theatrical release poster
- Directed by: Edgar G. Ulmer
- Screenplay by: Arthur C. Pierce
- Produced by: Robert Clarke
- Starring: Robert Clarke; Darlene Tompkins; Vladimir Sokoloff
- Cinematography: Meredith M. Nicholson
- Edited by: Jack Ruggiero
- Music by: Darrell Calker
- Distributed by: American International Pictures
- Release date: September 8, 1960
- Running time: 75 minutes
- Country: United States
- Language: English
- Budget: $125,000

Beyond the Time Barrier is a 1960 American science fiction film. It starred Robert Clarke (who also served as producer) and Vladimir Sokoloff, and was directed by Edgar G. Ulmer. Ulmer's wife Shirley acted as a script editor while their daughter Arianne Arden appeared in the film as a Russian pilot. It was one of two low budget sci-fi films shot back-to-back in Dallas, Texas by Ulmer (the other being The Amazing Transparent Man, released in February 1960). The combined filming schedule for both films was only two weeks.

It was released on September 8, 1960 on a double bill with The Angry Red Planet (1960). In some areas, it was also shown together with The Amazing Transparent Man (1960).

== Plot ==
In 1960, United States Air Force test pilot Major Bill Allison flies the X-80 experimental aircraft to sub-orbital spaceflight successfully, though he loses radio contact. When he returns to the airbase, it appears abandoned, old and deserted. Mystified, he sees a futuristic city on the horizon and heads for it. The major is rendered unconscious and captured.

When Allison wakes, he finds himself in a dystopian underground city known as the Citadel. Unnerved by his captors' refusal to speak with him, Allison's initial reaction is hostile, but he eventually calms down and is brought to their leader, the Supreme. The Supreme explains that he and his second-in-command, the Captain, are the only two residents of the Citadel who are able to speak or hear. The rest of the inhabitants, including the Supreme's granddaughter Trirene, are deaf-mutes, and everyone except possibly Trirene is sterile. A telepath, Trirene reads Allison's thoughts and indicates to the Supreme that she believes him not to be a spy, as the Captain suspects.

Despite this, the Captain sends Allison to an underground containment area, where a group of bald and violent mutants are determined to kill everyone in the Citadel. As the mutants attack him, Allison overpowers one and demands answers. They claim to be the survivors of a "cosmic plague", and they blame the residents of the Citadel for their problems. The Captain releases Allison and explains that Trirene has convinced the Supreme that he is not an enemy. Sensing his confusion, Trirene shows him historical photographs that help explain the Citadel's history, and at his urging, leads him to the "'scapes", two scientists and a Russian woman officer.

After disabling surveillance devices, the scientists explain that Allison has traveled through time to the year 2024. Nuclear fallout suspended in the air damaged the Earth's atmosphere, letting through dangerous cosmic rays in 1971, resulting in the cosmic plague. Even those who fled underground to the Citadel were still afflicted, although not as badly afflicted as those who stayed above ground, and there have been no births in twenty years. The 'scapes themselves are also accidental time travelers: Russian Captain Markova comes from 1973, and General Kruse and Professor Bourman arrived from colonies on other planets in 1994. Markova explains that the Supreme needs Allison to try to repopulate their society with Trirene's "help". The scientists warn Allison not to trust the Citadel. The Captain in turn warns Allison not to trust the trio.

As Trirene and Allison spend more time together, they fall in love. Although initially reluctant, Allison joins the 'scapes in a plan to turn Trirene against her people so that he can return to the past and try to change history. Markova sets the mutants free to attack the residents. She then demands that she accompany Allison, not Trirene, and to 1973, not 1960. Kruse and Bourman arrive, and Kruse shoots Markova for her treachery. Bourman knocks out Kruse, explaining that Kruse was planning to hijack the aircraft himself. Bourman, however, also intends to use the X-80 to return to his own time. As Allison and Bourman struggle over Kruse's pistol, a stray bullet fatally wounds Trirene before Allison can overcome Bourman.

Allison takes Trirene's body to the Supreme, who is distraught over both his granddaughter's death and the doom of his people, now that the last fertile person has died. The Supreme directs Allison toward a secret passage out, persuaded by Allison that there is always hope. Returned to his own time, Allison recounts his fantastic adventure in a recorded debriefing. As high-ranking officials visit Allison in the hospital, he is revealed to have aged drastically and is now an elderly man. Allison frantically warns them of the future events, and gives them Trirene's ring, which the Supreme had slipped onto Allison's finger. Secretary Lloyd Patterson says that they have a lot to think about.

== Cast ==
- Robert Clarke as Major William Allison
- Darlene Tompkins as Trirene
- Arianne Arden as Captain Markova
- Vladimir Sokoloff as the Supreme
- Stephen Bekassy as General Karl Kruse
- John van Dreelen as Dr. Bourman
- Red Morgan as the Captain
- Ken Knox as Colonel Marty Martin
- Don Flournoy as mutant
- Tom Ravick as mutant
- Neil Fletcher as Air Force Chief
- Jack Herman as Dr. Richman
- William Shapard as General York
- James Altgens as Secretary Lloyd Patterson
- John Loughney as General Lamont
- Russell Marker as Colonel Curtis

== Production ==
Producer Robert Clarke was exhausted from directing and acting in his production, The Hideous Sun Demon, and sought a director for this film. He had previously worked with Edgar G. Ulmer on The Man from Planet X and respected him. Clarke's funds originated in Texas, and the backers stipulated that the film be shot there, where motion picture unions had no influence. Clarke filmed in the Texas Centennial Exhibition Fair Park buildings. He secured cooperation from the United States Air Force and Texas Air National Guard, allowing him to film at Fort Worth's Carswell Air Force Base and the abandoned Marine Corps Air Station Eagle Mountain Lake. He obtained and used film footage of a Convair F-102 Delta Dagger standing in for the fictional "X-80" test plane. The film's action sequences used Air Force weapons, M1 carbines and M1911A1 pistols, with the actors taking care not to fire the weapons directly at one another. The film's working title was The Last Barrier.

Production designer Ernst Fegté employed a triangular motif for the futuristic sets that were filmed in the vacant showground buildings. Surplus parachutes were hung in the background to muffle echoes.

Clarke chose Darlene Tompkins over several contenders for the mute and psychic Trirene, including Yvette Mimieux (who appeared in The Time Machine) and Leslie Parrish. Ulmer selected his daughter Arianne for the role of Captain Alicia Markova, whose name came from the ballerina of the same name. Ulmer choreographed the daughter's movements similar to a ballet dance as she loosened her flight suit.

When giving her speech inciting the mutants to revolt, Arianne deliberately used voice inflections similar to Laurence Olivier reciting the St. Crispin's Day Speech from Henry V. American International Pictures (AIP) added footage for the mutant uprising sequence from their film Journey to the Lost City. One mutant was played by the screenwriter Arthur C. Pierce. Pierce was involved in the production and worked as an assistant editor.

Tompkins recalled that the actors portraying the mutants, whose makeup was created by Jack Pierce, taught her how to play cribbage on the set while in costume. Tompkins was asked to do a nude swimming scene for overseas release. She refused, and the swimming scenes were done by a body double. When filming her swimming in a flesh colored bathing suit, the crew used the motel swimming pool where they were staying; their night filming was disrupted by a fire that broke out at the motel.

Former football player Boyd Morgan performed stunts and played the Captain of the Guard. Darrell Calker, the music chief of Walter Lantz's cartoons, composed the film score.

AIP's James H. Nicholson was keen on releasing the film based on his teenage daughters' recommendation after screening the film. AIP partner Samuel Z. Arkoff, asked Clarke what he wanted to do with the film. Clarke said he wanted to produce several films for AIP, but Arkoff said AIP did not use contract producers. Clarke found a similar, but newer and inexperienced film company called Pacific International Pictures (PIP) or Miller-Consolidated Pictures, who were keen on working with Clarke and releasing his films. However, PIP went bankrupt and AIP was able to purchase two of Clarke's films held by PIP for no more than the laboratory costs. The films were released under the AIP banner. Clarke was paid only his acting salary.

As Miller Consolidated Films went into bankruptcy, AIP released the film on September 8, 1960 on a double bill with The Angry Red Planet (1960). It was theatrically released in some areas on a double bill with The Amazing Transparent Man, another Ulmer-directed film made by Miller but picked up by AIP for the lab costs.

== Reception ==
Rotten Tomatoes, a review aggregator, reports that 60% of five surveyed critics gave the film a positive review; the average rating is 4.56/10. Dave Kehr of the Chicago Reader wrote, "Even on this despairing level of fly-by-night filmmaking, Ulmer's treatment remains resolutely personal, and the film, though visually slack, emerges as something terse, resourceful, and expressively icy." J. Hoberman of The Village Voice wrote that it "suggests an impoverished remake of the 1924 Soviet constructivist space opera Aelita".
