= Card Mondor =

Australian magician

Card Mondor (1922-2001) was an Australian magician and stage performer. A one time assistant for the Great Virgil, he gained fame as a performer in the United States, most notably for entertaining troops during World War II. He was featured on the cover of Genii (magazine) in April 1947. In the 1940s and 1950s, he was involved in exploitation films, at one time working for Kroger Babb, presenting his film Mom and Dad and eventually securing the rights to distribute the film in Australia and New Zealand.

In his later years, Mondor was in charge of Aladdin's Magic Shop, in Melbourne, Australia and wrote an autobiography, Dreams, Schemes, Nightmares and Illusion prior to his death in 2001.
