= Arthur Lee Simpkins =

American singer (1907–1972)

Arthur Lee "Georgia Boy" Simpkins (1907–1972) was an American singer.

Originally from South Carolina, where he became known as the "Black Caruso" in reference to the opera singer Enrico Caruso, Simpkins performed in Augusta, Georgia, with his group Night Hawks.

First gaining popularity in Chicago under the moniker "Georgia Boy", Simpkins performed a wide variety of music ranging from classic standards to operatic renditions, being able to perform not only many different genres but in many different languages. In 1936, he recorded "Sing, Sing, Sing (with a Swing)" with Fletcher Henderson and His Orchestra.

He sang at the 1964 memorial for Sam Cooke.

Simpkins appeared on television regularly as a vocalist and performer, particularly on the series You Asked For It. Although Simpkins made many recordings, he fared better on the performing circuit in areas like Las Vegas and Los Angeles until his untimely death following a bladder operation.

The once-famous Simpkins died in relative obscurity, leaving a widow Aurora.
