= Lila Leeds =

American actress (1928–1999)

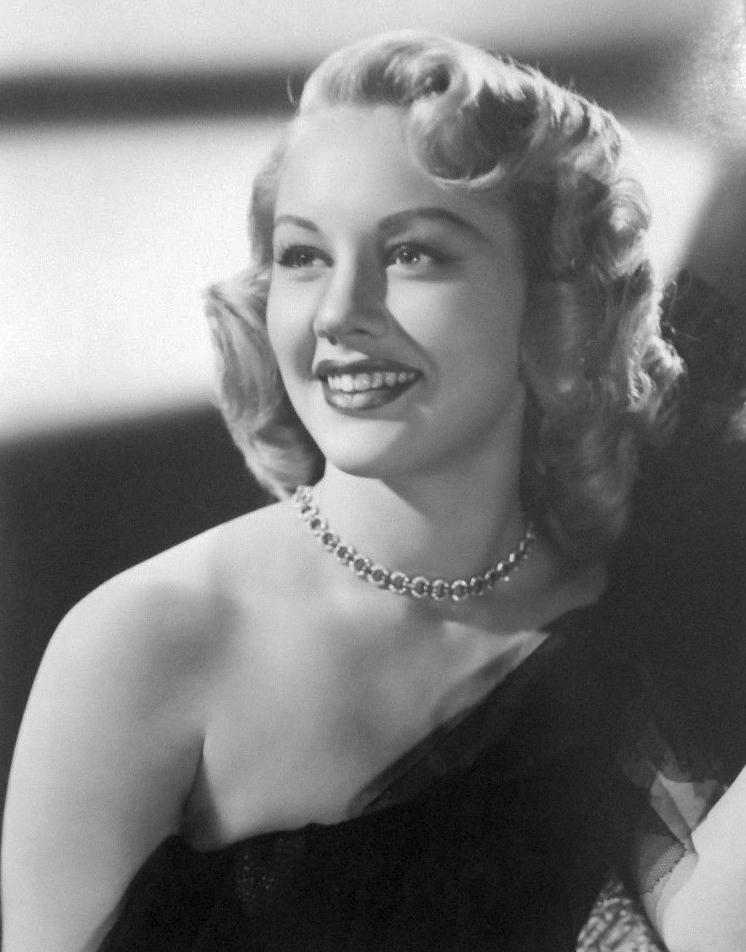
- Born: Lila Lee Wilkinson; January 28, 1928; Dodge City, Kansas, U.S.
- Died: September 15, 1999 (aged 71); Canoga Park, California, U.S.
- Occupation: Actress
- Years active: 1946–1949
- Spouse(s): Jack Little (annulled); Dean O. McCollom (1949–1950); Irving Rochlin (1951–1958)

Lila Leeds (born Lila Lee Wilkinson, January 28, 1928 – September 15, 1999) was an American film actress.

== Early life and career ==
Born in Dodge City, Kansas, Leeds's mother relocated to Clovis, New Mexico where Lila lived during her teens. Lila worked the box office at the local movie theatre. She then ran away from home. She worked as a dancer in St. Louis before moving to Los Angeles. While working as a hatcheck girl at Ciro's, she met and married actor, composer, singer and conductor Jack Little. The marriage was annulled when Leeds discovered that Little was already married.

In 1945 Leeds appeared on stage at the Harold Lloyd co-founded venue and talent showcase, the Beverly Hills Little Theatre for Professionals, when she was still a teenager, starring in a campus comedy. After taking an acting course at the Bliss-Hayden School of Acting, Leeds signed with Metro-Goldwyn-Mayer and began appearing in small roles. Leeds appeared in the Red Skelton film The Show-Off (1946); Lady in the Lake (1947), based on a Raymond Chandler story; and in the Lana Turner vehicle Green Dolphin Street, where she played a Eurasian who drugs the leading man and rolls him for his money. She had a small part in So You Want to Be a Detective, which was part of the Joe McDoakes series of theatrical shorts, the film being a reworking of the subjective camera style used in Lady in the Lake, in which Leeds had previously appeared.

Leeds was producer Harold Hecht's top choice to star in Kiss the Blood Off My Hands, the first film by Hecht and co-star Burt Lancaster's production company Norma Productions. Leeds was ultimately replaced by Joan Fontaine, who was already under contract with the movie's financer and distributor Universal-International Pictures.

On September 1, 1948, Leeds gained notoriety for being arrested together with actor Robert Mitchum on charges of marijuana possession. She was subsequently sentenced to spend sixty days in jail.

Considered a Lana Turner look-alike, Leeds was 20 years old and engaged to Turner's ex-husband Stephen Crane at the time of her arrest. Cheryl Crane, Turner and Stephen's daughter, wrote that Leeds first tried marijuana with members of Stan Kenton's orchestra and that she was introduced to heroin while in jail. After Leeds was arrested, Crane fled to Europe rather than become entangled in the scandal.

Although she starred in the Reefer Madness–style film She Shoulda Said No! (1949) following her release from jail, her acting career, unlike Mitchum's, never recovered from the scandal.

== Later years ==
Unable to find more work in films, Leeds left California in 1949. She moved around the Midwest where she worked in nightclubs, married and divorced twice, and had three children, Shawn, Ivan and Laura, all of whom lived in Southern California. She eventually made her way back to Los Angeles in 1966 where she studied religion, established a church and volunteered at local missions and soup kitchens.

== Death ==
On September 15, 1999, Leeds died of a heart attack at age 71 in Los Angeles.

== Filmography ==
Year	Title	Role	Notes
1946	I Love My Husband, But!	Blonde trying on Hat	Short, Uncredited
1946	The Show-Off	Flo	
1947	Lady in the Lake	Receptionist	
1947	Green Dolphin Street	Eurasian Girl	Uncredited
1947	Always Together	Blonde	Uncredited
1948	April Showers	Society Girl	Uncredited
1948	So You Want to Be a Detective	Veronica Vacuum	Short, Uncredited
1948	Moonrise	Julie	
1949	City Across the River	Undetermined Role	Uncredited
1949	She Shoulda Said No!	Anne Lester	
1949	The House Across the Street	Billie Martin	Uncredited, (final film role)
