= Street Corner (1948 film) =

1948 film by Albert H. Kelley

- Directed by: Albert H. Kelley
- Screenplay by: Jack Jungmeyer; Albert H. Kelley; Edwin Roth
- Produced by: George McCall; James M. Doane
- Starring: Johnny Duncan; Marcia Mae Jones; Eddie Gribbon
- Cinematography: Virgil Miller
- Edited by: John Faure
- Music by: Bernard Katz
- Production company: Wilshire Pictures
- Distributed by: Modern Film Distributors
- Release date: December 3, 1948
- Running time: 73 minutes
- Country: United States
- Language: English

Street Corner is a 1948 American exploitation film directed by Albert H. Kelley, produced by Wilshire Pictures, and featuring Johnny Duncan, Eddie Gribbon, and Marcia Mae Jones. Along with Mom and Dad, Because of Eve, and Bob and Sally, Street Corner was one of the four prominent postwar hygiene films that became part of the Modern Film hygiene consortium. The film drew controversy by showing the step-by-step procedure of a Caesarean section. In 2003, it was released on DVD by Something Weird Video.

== Plot ==
Narrated to the viewing audience in flashback format by a sympathetic family doctor (after beginning with a trial in which an unnamed older woman is sentenced to 10 years in prison for an undisclosed crime), the movie revolves around Lois Marsh, a high school girl who discovers that she is pregnant by her boyfriend, Bob Mason. Lois worries about her options. She and Bob decide to marry in secret, but Bob dies In a car accident on his way to meet Lois. Lois then confides in a waitress who directs her to someone who performs abortions.

After the abortion, Lois passes out on the street. She is immediately brought to her family doctor where she tells him what has happened. The doctor admits Lois to the hospital and informs her parents about the abortion. The movie concludes with the doctor giving a sex education lecture to teens and their parents using graphic, visual depictions of venereal disease, female anatomy, pregnancy, and childbirth.

== Cast ==
- Joseph Crehan as Dr. James Fenton
- Marcia Mae Jones as Lois Marsh
- Jean Fenwick as Mrs. Marsh
- Don Brodie as Arnold Marsh
- John Treul as Bob Mason
- Billie Jean Eberhart as Irene (credited as Billie Jeanne Eberhart)
- Jan Sutton as Kitty Mae
- Gretl Dupont as The Abortionist
- Jean Andren as Dr. Fenton's Nurse
- Johnny Duncan as Hal (credited as John Duncan)
- Sam Ash as District Attorney
- Stuart Holmes as Judge
- Wendell Niles as Wendell Niles
- Michael Ross as Tom Brennan (credited as Milton Ross)
- Dale Van Sickel as The Passing Motorist
- Dandy Nichols as Mrs. Furness - Neighbour (uncredited)

== Release ==
The film included a graphic segment on the effects of venereal disease. In its year of release, the film received a "C" for Condemned from the National Legion of Decency, a Catholic organization. The objection stated: "This film treats a subject most objectionable for presentation in entertainment motion picture theaters. The treatment of the subject as presented in the film is most objectionable for motion picture audiences. Moreover, it ignores completely essential and supernatural values associated with questions of this nature."

In 1951, the film was re-issued without the segment on venereal disease, but included color footage of a natural birth. The re-issue was screened to gender segregated audiences, with an advertisement including the statement, "Nurses in attendance all shows." The re-issued film also featured an intermission during which a "hygienist," billed as "Curtis Hayes," distributed booklets on sex education.
