= Cox and Underwood =

Cox and Underwood was the name of an exploitation film travelling road show and production company from the 1930s, run by Howard Russell Cox and Howard Underwood. They, at one time, employed Kroger Babb, who would later form his own medicine show-style production company.
