= Square-up =

Feature of exploitation films in the 1940s and 1950s

A square-up was a common feature of exploitation films in the 1940s and 1950s. With the exception of most burlesque features during the 1950s, the films would begin with a written message about what social or moral issue the film was planning to address. For instance, She Shoulda Said No! contained a square-up concerning youth drug abuse, and Child Bride the issue of child marriage.

The first square-up has been traced to Eureka Productions' 1912 film The Evil Art (or) Gambling Exposed. The general reasoning for the square-up was an expression of regret for presenting the subject of the film followed by a statement with the desire that the film will help in efforts to combat the subject. Often, these justifications were created with the intent to work around the production code, giving the films a veneer of educational or social value as opposed to being simply exploitation features, but also served the purpose of warming up the audience for the upcoming film contents.

Square-ups gained another meaning with some exploitation films. David F. Friedman has explained that, in some cities, the police would not allow a full screening of a film with nudity or other objectionable content. Following the announcement to the now-upset crowd, the edited film was shown, and, after the film was over, a second reel with the excised material was shown. Coming from the carnival term "squaring a beef," these "square-up reels" became typical. In some cases, such as The Girls of Loma-Loma, the entire film became a short square-up reel.
