= Pressbook =

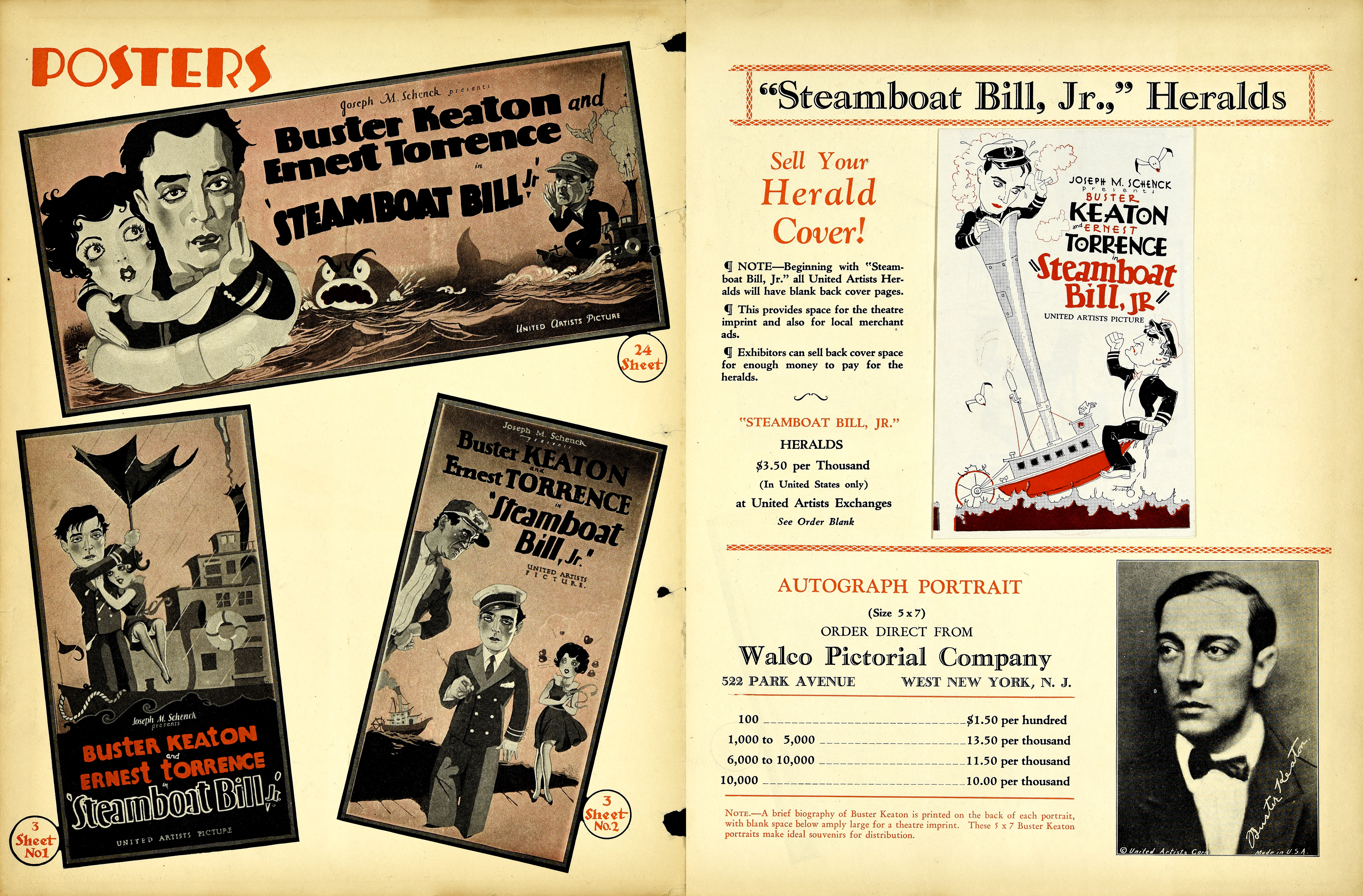
Spread from the pressbook for Steamboat Bill, Jr. (1928)

In the world of theatrical film exhibition, a pressbook was a promotional tool created and distributed by film distributors in order to market their films. Sometimes called "campaign manuals," most pressbooks took the form of large, multi-page brochures that were mailed to movie theaters in the interest of helping theaters attract an audience.

A typical pressbook contained images of the various advertising "accessories" available to promote a movie, including images of the available film posters, lobby cards, and 8 x 10 film stills. They also contained the various newspaper advertisements exhibitor could employ in local newspaper advertising as well as short, feature pieces that could be planted in local newspapers, usually without cost. During Hollywood's Golden Age, pressbooks also contained various ideas for so-called exploitation campaigns, including souvenir-style give-aways, tie-ins and contests, as well as live promotional stunts. Most pressbooks also contained a list of the film's cast and crew credits (probably to assist local film critics.)

A movie pressbook should be distinguished from a press book, which is a collection of works and communications used to represent an individual, group of individuals, service, company or product. Such press books are usually associated with professionals in the graphic arts, etc. but are used by people in many other professions as well.
