= Modern Film Distributors =

Modern Film Distributors was the name of a film distribution organization cartel formed by filmmakers in the 1940s. Following the success of the exploitation film Mom and Dad, the four leading presenters of the time (including Kroger Babb) agreed to work together to book each other's films (Mom and Dad, Street Corner, Because of Eve, and The Story of Bob and Sally) in various territories to reduce overlap and increase the profits for each party.
