= Bob and Sally =

1948 film by Erle C. Kenton

- Directed by: Erle C. Kenton
- Screenplay by: Mary C. Palmer
- Produced by: J. G. Sanford
- Production company: Universal Studios
- Release date: 1948
- Running time: 71 minutes
- Country: United States
- Language: English

Bob and Sally is 1948 American drama film produced by J. G. Sanford at Universal Studios and directed by Erle C. Kenton. Director of photography was Ellis Carter and the original screenplay was written by Mary C. Palmer.

The film was one of the various "hygienic films" that were produced in the late 1940s, heavily influenced by the exploitation movie Mom and Dad (1945), produced by Kroger Babb and directed by William Beaudine.

However, due to conflicts with the Production Code, Bob and Sally was not exhibited in the United States and its rights were later sold. The movie was re-released under two other titles, The Story of Bob and Sally and Tell Our Parents.

== Plot ==
This relationship drama of strain and hardship picks up when Mr. and Mrs. Wright are at the hospital, waiting for their daughter Helen to give birth to their first grandchild. Doctor Loren Carey soon comes to inform them that the baby was born blind due to the mother having suffered from syphilis. The mother, Helen Cooper, separated from her husband, Jim Cooper, months ago because of his drinking problem.

After the baby is born, Mr. Wright manages to find Jim, but only to tell him that the baby died at the hospital. Jim is found drinking, hiding in a dodgy part of the town. When he hears the bad news, he starts thinking back of his wedding and the time after.

At the time of the wedding, Helen's kid sister Sally was dating a boy named Bob Jordan, but they were only sixteen and too young to get married. Mrs. Wright refused to talk to her youngest daughter about the birds and the bees, thinking she was still only a child.

Soon after, Helen comes back from her honeymoon, alone, and claims to have parted from her husband. Jim comes to the house just moments after, and while Helen speaks to her mother, Jim speaks to her father. At the end of the evening, when Helen and Jim are alone at home, they manage to reconcile.

Months later, Jim goes on a bender again, and he and Helen quarrel over a party they were supposed to attend. Again, they manage to make up at the end of the night. At the same time, Sally and Bob go up by car to a romantic spot and have relations with each other.

When Sally later discovers that she is pregnant, she decides to have an abortion, since they are too young to marry and start a family. Bob protests, but eventually agrees and finds a "doctor" who can perform the procedure. Sally turns to her older sister Helen for advice, but she is occupied with her own problems and dealing with Jim's alcoholism.

Sally becomes desperate and decides to go through with the procedure. On the day of the appointment, she finds herself alone at the dodgy doctor's office, and goes through the whole horrible procedure alone. Bob has managed to get arrested for stealing his mother's diamond ring to pay the doctor.

Sally gets ill after the procedure, and faints on the bus home. A friend of her mother's takes her to the hospital, where she recovers, but because of the procedure she will not be able to bear children anymore.

Sally and Bob finally decide to marry, and their parents realize they have to help the young adults on the way. They ask the help of Dr. Carey, who supplies information to pass on to the youngsters. After Sally and Bob are married, Dr. Carey pays a visit to the unfortunate Helen, telling her about Jim being cured from his drinking problems and wanting to come back to her. When she tells the doctor she is willing to give Jim another chance, the doctor reveals that Jim is with him and sends him in to reconcile with Helen once again.

== Cast ==
- Gloria Marlen as Sally Wright
- Ralph Hodges as Bob Jordan
- Rick Vallin as Jim Cooper
- Mildred Coles as Helen Cooper
- Charles Quigley as John Wright
- Mary Bear as Martha Wright
- Charles Evans as Dr. Loren Carey
- William Newell as Jean Andren
