= Hygienic Productions =

American film production company

Hygienic Productions was a film production company based out of Wilmington, Ohio. Formed by exploitation film producer Kroger Babb, the company was in charge of promotion and production for a number of Babb's films, including the infamous Mom and Dad.

Following the success of Mom and Dad, Babb renamed the company to a more general name, Hallmark Productions, and later, the "Hallmark Big-6." They continued presenting sexual education and medical-style films while expanding to more genres, including drug message films such as "She Shoulda Said 'No'!" and shock films like Karamoja.
