= Million Dollar Babies =

- Screenplay by: Suzette Couture; Stuart Foxman; John Nihmey
- Directed by: Christian Duguay
- Starring: Beau Bridges; Roy Dupuis; Sean McCann; Kate Nelligan
- Theme music composer: Christopher Dedrick
- Countries of origin: United States; Canada
- Original language: English

Production
- Producer: Bernard Zukerman
- Cinematography: David Franco
- Editor: Yves Langlois
- Running time: 180 minutes
- Production companies: Bernard Zuckerman Productions; Quint Film Productions; CINAR Films; 5 Babies Inc. CBC Television; CBS Productions

Original release
- Network: CBS
- Release: November 20 – November 22, 1994

Million Dollar Babies is a 1994 period drama television film based on the fact based novel Time of Their Lives—The Dionne Tragedy by John Nihmey and Stuart Foxman. It was an American/Canadian co-production by CBS, Cinar (later Wildbrain), and CBC.

== Plot ==
The poor Dionne family lives in rural Ontario, Canada. The mother, Elzire, collapses and goes into what everyone thinks is premature labor. Even though they have no money her husband, Oliva, races to get a doctor. Early on the morning of May 28, 1934 she gives birth to five daughters, the famous Dionne Quintuplets.

The story soon develops into a media frenzy. Radio personality Helena Reid arrives on the scene. Oliva and the other children leave in order to save the quints from infections. After Americans take the lead in providing for the quints, the Ontario government finally starts to provide some assistance. Oliva signs a deal to have the quints displayed at the Chicago World’s Fair, and he is attacked for this by Helena Reid. The Ontario government moves to take the children. They all develop high fevers, but they recover under the care of Dr. Dafoe. The Ontario government declares the quints wards of the state, naming Dr. Dafoe as their guardian.

The children are placed in a house built just for them across the road. Dr. Dafoe starts to profit from the kids, including taking them on tour. The kids are put on display and the area acquires a circus-like atmosphere. Finally, the parents are only allowed to visit with Dr. Dafoe’s permission.

The Dionne parents try to tell their story, and in response the government extends the guardianship until the quints are 18 years old. Dr. Dafoe reaps tremendous money in endorsement deals for the quints. The Dionnes have a baby boy. The quints are kept on a strict schedule and isolated from everyone else and put on display for mobs of tourists. Only one of their nurses disapproves of this and is fired.

The parents finally find a lawyer to help them regain custody of the girls. He strategizes that the quints were only taken because the parents were French-Canadians. They get French nurses and teachers hired. The parents get better access. The government tires of Dr. Dafoe's excesses and removes him as guardian. Oliva learns that the quints are paying for all their expenses out of their funds. Helena Reid returns and now sides with the Dionnes. In a dramatic confrontation, Emilie goes to Dr. Dafoe instead of her mother. Ms. Reid has Dr. Alfred Adler condemn the quints' living situation. The quints and their parents meet the King and Queen. The guardianship is dissolved, and the girls are returned to their parents.

== Cast ==
- Beau Bridges as Dr. Allan Roy Dafoe
- Roy Dupuis as Oliva Dionne
- Céline Bonnier as Elzire Dionne
- Sean McCann as Premier Mitch Hepburn
- Ginette Reno as Madame Legros
- Domini Blythe as Nurse Lena de Keyzer
- Kate Nelligan as Helena Reid
- Rémy Girard as Attorney Martin Poulin
