= Reunion (1936 film) =

1936 film

The Reunion
- Theatrical release poster
- Directed by: Norman Taurog; Ed O'Fearna
- Screenplay by: Sam Hellman; Gladys Lehman; Sonya Levien
- Story by: Bruce Gould
- Produced by: Earl Carroll; Harold Wilson; Bogart Rogers
- Starring: The Dionne Quintuplets; Jean Hersholt; Rochelle Hudson; Helen Vinson; Slim Summerville; Robert Kent; Dorothy Peterson; John Quelan; Alan Dinehart; J. Edward Bromberg; Sara Haden; Montagu Love; Tom Moore; Katharine Alexander
- Cinematography: Daniel B. Clark
- Edited by: Jack Murray
- Distributed by: 20th Century Fox
- Release date: November 20, 1936
- Running time: 79 minutes
- Country: United States
- Language: English

Reunion is a 1936 American comedy film and directed by Norman Taurog and starring the Dionne quintuplets, Jean Hersholt and Rochelle Hudson. It was produced and distributed by 20th Century Fox.

== Plot ==
Newspapers around the world proclaim the birth of the 3,000th baby in Moosetown, Canada, who was delivered by Dr. John Luke, known for delivering the famous Wyatt quintuplets. To honor the doctor on his retirement and to publicize their town, the Moosetown Chamber of Commerce decides to hold a reunion of all the babies delivered by the doctor. Some of those babies have since become famous. The first baby he delivered, Phillip Crandall, is now a governor. One other is the motion picture star, Janet Fair.

Phillip and his wife are childless. Phillip is against adoption because he fears that his opponent in the upcoming election would suggest that the adopted baby was his from the past. He decides to go to the reunion to renew his friendship with Dr. Luke, whom he hasn't seen since a fishing trip twelve years earlier. When Janet, who is down on her luck, learns from her agent that she has the lead in a New York show, she decides to accept the invitation to the reunion for the publicity she hopes it will bring.

In Atlanta, the quintuplets' father (Asa Wyatt) is upset when his rival (Constable Jim Ogden) excitedly brags that his wife is due any minute to give birth to six babies because two fortune-tellers have told him so. When Jim's wife gives birth to one baby, Jim is disappointed at first, but as he plays with his new baby daughter he tells her that he'd rather have her than six or sixty babies.

After Dr. Luke's nephew Tony arrives from Tennessee to take Dr. Luke's position, Tony receives a call from a woman in Toronto. This upsets nurse Mary McKenzie, Tony's sweetheart. Many of the thousands who come to the reunion throng around Janet, who is pleased to see her old friend, bachelor Charlie Renard. Phillip is attracted to an orphan named Rusty, who Dr. Luke says was born eleven years ago to a woman who died of a broken heart. The mention of the woman's name greatly affects Phillip.

Dr. Richard Sheridan and his wife Gloria then arrive from Toronto, and Gloria (the woman who called Tony) tells him that she plans to divorce Dick. Dick is a workaholic whom she no longer loves. When Dr. Luke (surmising the affair between Tony and Gloria) berates his son, Tony admits that he doesn't love Gloria. Although Dr. Luke pleads with him to end the affair, Tony refuses, feeling that he owes it to Gloria to carry on. When Dr. Luke tries to convince Gloria that Tony doesn't love her, but that he loves Mary, she becomes indignant. Dr. Luke then convinces her to freshen up in a bedroom and arranges for Mary to meet Tony in an adjoining room. When Dr. Luke makes Tony admit that an older woman has made a fool of him, Gloria overhears and leaves in an agitated state. Although Tony confesses that he loves Mary, she says she cannot love anyone who could turn his affections off and on at will.

At the reunion gathering, Dr. Luke instructs Rusty to repeatedly make a gesture identical to one that Phillip makes. Won over by the boy, Phillip asks Dr. Luke about adoption formalities. When a telegram arrives from Janet's agent stating that the deal for the role in the New York play is off because the producer wants a younger woman, Janet, who is shaken, goes inside. The gathered then watch as the quintuplets arrive, each in a pony-drawn carriage, and play in a fenced-in enclosure. Dick tells Dr. Luke that he and Gloria, after a long talk, have decided to go abroad for a second honeymoon. Gloria shakes Dr. Luke's hand. Dr. Luke then learns that Janet has shot herself.

Tony takes charge of the operation with Mary as his assistant. After the operation, Tony tells Charlie that Janet will survive if she has anything to live for. Charlie calls her by her real name, Mamie. Then he kisses her face, and she takes his hand. Tony and Mary reconcile. Dr. Luke's long time nurse, Katherine Kennedy, mildly rebukes him for falsely making Phillip believe that he is Rusty's father.

== Cast ==
- Jean Hersholt as Dr. John Luke
- Rochelle Hudson as Mary MacKenzie
- Helen Vinson as Gloria Sheridan
- Slim Summerville as Jim Ogdan
- Robert Kent as Tony Luke
- John Qualen as Asa Wyatt
- Dorothy Peterson as Katherine Kennedy
- Alan Dinehart as Philip Crandell
- J. Edward Bromberg as Charles Renard
- Sara Haden as Ellie
- George Chandler as Jake

== Notes ==
The working title of this film was They Always Come Back. Actress Maude Eburne's surname is incorrectly spelled Eburn in the onscreen credits. This was the second film featuring the Dionne Quintuplets. Their first film, The Country Doctor, a fictional account of their birth, was released earlier in 1936. The screen credits note that "Scenes of the Dionne Quintuplets were photographed at Callander, Ontario under the technical supervision of Dr. Allan R. Dafoe". Dr. Dafoe was the Canadian doctor who delivered the quintuplets on May 28, 1934.

According to the pressbook for the film, a company of eighty people from Twentieth Century-Fox arrived in Callander and began filming on August 17, 1936. The quintuplets, who were two years and three months at the time, were filmed for twenty-six days, except Sundays, for one hour a day and were paid $83,000. A special blue filter for the lights, which cameraman Daniel Clark developed for The Country Doctor was also used in this film. Helen Jerome Eddy was listed as a cast member in a The Hollywood Reporter production chart, but her participation in the final film has not been confirmed.
