= The Country Doctor (1936 film) =

1936 American drama film

- Theatrical release poster
- Directed by: Henry King
- Screenplay by: Sonya Levien
- Story by: Charles E. Blake
- Produced by: Nunnally Johnson
- Starring: Jean Hersholt; June Lang; Slim Summerville; Michael Whalen; Dorothy Peterson; Robert Barrat
- Cinematography: Daniel B. Clark; John F. Seitz
- Edited by: Barbara McLean
- Music by: R.H. Bassett; Cyril J. Mockridge
- Production company: 20th Century Fox
- Distributed by: 20th Century Fox
- Release date: March 12, 1936
- Running time: 95 minutes
- Country: United States
- Language: English
- Budget: $650,000
- Box office: $1.4 million

The Country Doctor is a 1936 American drama film directed by Henry King and written by Sonya Levien. The film stars Jean Hersholt, June Lang, Slim Summerville, Michael Whalen, Dorothy Peterson and Robert Barrat. The Country Doctor was released on March 12, 1936, by 20th Century Fox.

== Plot ==
The Country Doctor is set in a remote area of Quebec, Canada. The country doctor John Luke is an unlicensed general practitioner who cares for the residents of a small Canadian timber station taking much of his payment in barter. Having spent years operating from the station and from his own dwelling, and following a particularly bad epidemic of diphtheria in which several children die, the doctor decides to travel to Montreal to speak with the medical managing director of the region. The doctor's hope is that the director will try to get the rich corporation that owns the land to pay for a proper hospital.

After trying unsuccessfully to make any headway and finding himself stymied by governmental red tape, he crashes a public dinner given by the medical association to argue his point in person. The timber corporation hears of this protest and sends their lawyers to take revenge on the doctor. During the investigation the doctor's lack of a license is quickly discovered and the local police are informed that the doctor has been practicing illegally. The doctor returns to the timber station in low spirits.

Before long, Asa Wyatt, one of the workers comes to the doctor's house with his pregnant wife. She is just about to give birth and the worker begs the doctor to help them despite his lack of a license.

The local constabulary become involved and warn the doctor that he could face charges if he delivers the baby, but the doctor finds that he can't simply stand by passively and he starts to help the mother as the police berate him. After delivering the child, the doctor realizes that the birth is actually a multiple birth and the delivery continues until the doctor has delivered five babies.

When word gets out, the doctor becomes a national hero, the building of a local hospital is set in motion, and the medical managing director in Montreal is congratulated by the Governor-General.

== Cast ==
- The Dionne Quintuplets as The Wyatt Quintuplets
- Yvonne Dionne as Yvonne
- Cecile Dionne as Cécile
- Marie Dionne as Marie
- Annette Dionne as Annette
- Emilie Dionne as Émelie
- Jean Hersholt as Dr. John Luke
- June Lang as Mary MacKenzie
- Slim Summerville as Constable Jim Ogden
- Michael Whalen as Tony Luke
- Dorothy Peterson as Nurse Katherine Kennedy
- Robert Barrat as MacKenzie
- Jane Darwell as Mrs. Graham
- John Qualen as Asa Wyatt
- Frank Reicher as Dr. Paul Luke
- Montagu Love as Sir Basil Crawford
- David Torrence as Governor General
- George Chandler as Greasy
- Helen Jerome Eddy as Mrs. Ogden
- Aileen Carlyle as Mrs. Wyatt
- George Meeker as Dr. Wilson
- J. Anthony Hughes as Mike
- William "Billy" Benedict as The Gawker
- Claude King as Toastmaster
- Richard Carlyle (uncredited)

== Production ==
In The Country Doctor (1936), a movie starring the quints, Jean Hersholt portrayed Dr. John Luke, a character based on Dr. Allan Roy Dafoe. The setting was in a remote area of Quebec, although in real life the Dionnes were born and grew up in rural Ontario. There were two sequels: Reunion (1936) and Five of a Kind (1938). (Note: When Dr. Dafoe rejected the idea of continuing the series, Jean Hersholt created Dr. Christian, which had a long run on radio.)

== Reception ==
Film reviewer Frank Nugent in his review of The Country Doctor for The New York Times described the "fell-good" film: "We were prepared to disapprove of the quintuplets as a matter of policy, but there is no holding out against "The Country Doctor" at the Music Hall, in which they are making their first screen appearance—not counting the newsreels. An irresistibly appealing blend of sentiment and comedy, the Twentieth Century-Fox picture justifies even that anonymous advertising genius who described the advent of the Dionne babies as the greatest event since "The Birth of a Nation".

Writing for The Spectator in 1936, Graham Greene gave the film a good review, describing it as "an honest film" and "admirably genuine". Greene praised Hersholt for "one of the most sympathetic performances [he had] seen this year", and noted that although those judging the film from the austerest angle might find the comic aspects of the film to be "not in the best taste", he himself found sequences like the delivery of quintuplets to have been "extraordinarily funny".
