= Five Times Five =

1939 film

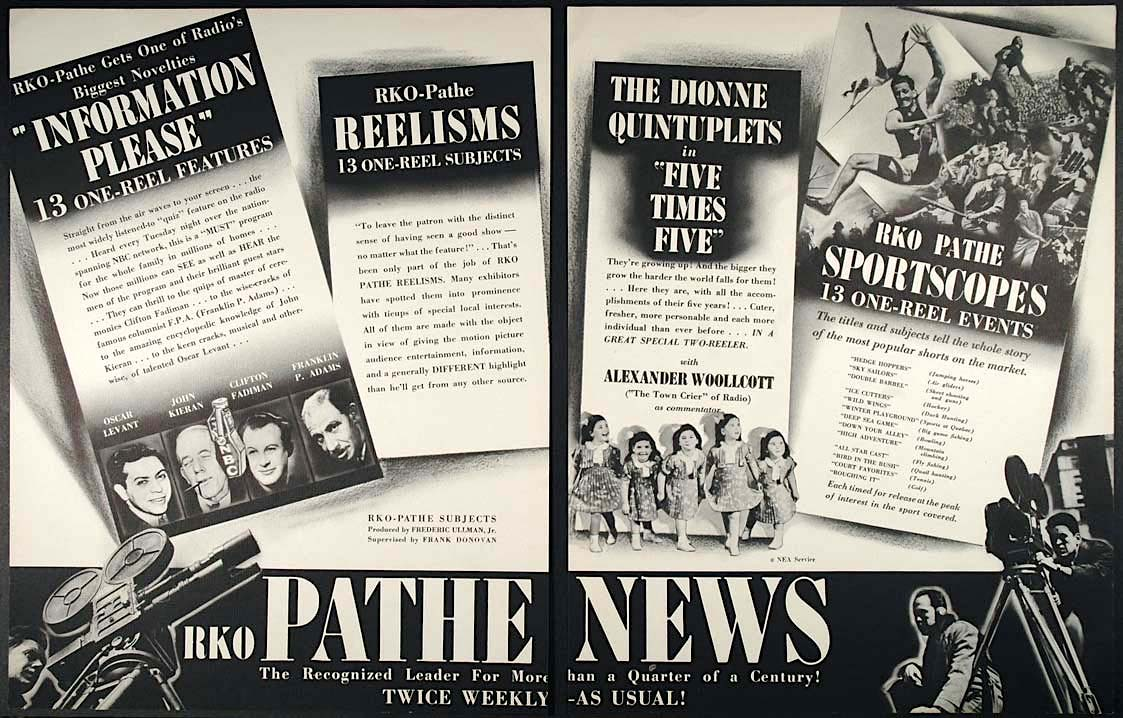
- 1939 advertisement for RKO Pathé News short films including Five Times Five
- Directed by: Frank P. Donovan
- Written by: Frederic Ullman Jr. Alexander Woollcott
- Produced by: Frederic Ullman Jr.
- Starring: The Dionne quintuplets
- Cinematography: Harry W. Smith
- Release date: July 19, 1939
- Running time: 20 minutes
- Country: United States
- Language: English

Five Times Five is a 1939 American short documentary film directed by Frank P. Donovan. It was nominated for an Academy Award at the 12th Academy Awards in 1940 for Best Live Action Short Film, Two-Reel. The Dionne quintuplets have a private five-years-old birthday party in their garden.

== Cast ==
- Alexander Woollcott as Commentary
- The Dionne quintuplets (Annette, Cecile, Emile, Yvonne and Marie)
- Allan R. Dafoe (as Dr. Roy Dafoe) as Quintuplets' doctor
