= Five of a Kind =

1938 film by Herbert I. Leeds

- Theatrical release poster
- Directed by: Herbert I. Leeds
- Screenplay by: Lou Breslow and John Patrick
- Produced by: Sol M. Wurtzel (executive producer)
- Starring: The Dionne Quintuplets; Jean Hersholt; Claire Trevor; Cesar Romero; Slim Summerville; Henry Wilcoxon; Inez Courtney; John Qualen; Jane Darwell; Pauline Moore
- Cinematography: Daniel B. Clark, A.S.C.
- Edited by: Fred Allen
- Music by: Samuel Kaylin (musical direction)
- Production company: 20th Century Fox
- Distributed by: 20th Century Fox
- Release date: October 14, 1938
- Running time: 85 minutes
- Country: United States
- Language: English

Five of a Kind is a 1938 American comedy film directed by Herbert I. Leeds and written by Lou Breslow and John Patrick. The film stars the Dionne quintuplets, Jean Hersholt, Claire Trevor and Cesar Romero. The film was released on October 14, 1938, by 20th Century Fox. The film follows the escalating rivalry between radio journalists Duke Lester (Romero) and Christine Nelson (Trevor) that culminates in a competition to cover the exploits of the famous Canadian quintuplets, the Wyatts, played by The Dionne Quintuplets.

== Plot ==
Reporters for rival newspapers, Christine Nelson and Duke Lester, meet on the trail of a run-away heiress and engage in a series of tricks to get the scoop.

After being fired due to deliberate misinformation, Nelson gets a job as a radio interviewer setting her sights on the Dionne quintuplets. Lester gets wind of the interview, arrives first, and reignites the "war". Nelson wins this round.

To counter Nelson's popularity, Lester fabricates a story about sextuplets. Thinking she is breaking the story, Nelson talks on air to Lester's fake doctor. Other newshounds quickly expose the story as false, destroying a planned benefit for a New York orphanage-hospital.

When Lester discovers the impact of his actions, he works to repair the damage and save the benefit.

== Cast ==
=== In opening credits ===
- The Dionne quintuplets
  - Yvonne
  - Cecile
  - Marie
  - Annette
  - Emelie
- with Jean Hersholt
- Claire Trevor
- Cesar Romero
- and Slim Summerville
- Henry Wilcoxon
- Inez Courtney
- John Qualen
- Jane Darwell
- Pauline Moore

=== In end credits ===
- Jean Hersholt as Dr. John Luke
- Claire Trevor as Christine Nelson
- Cesar Romero as Duke Lester
- Slim Summerville as Jim Ogden
- Henry Wilcoxon as Dr. Scott Williams
- Inez Courtney as Libby Long
- John Qualen as Asa Wyatt
- Jane Darwell as Mrs. Waldron
- Pauline Moore as Elinor Kingsley
- John Russell as Dickie
- Andrew Tombes as Dr. Bruno
- David Torrence as Sir Basil Crawford
- Marion Byron as Nurse Corday
- Hamilton MacFadden as Andrew Gordon
- Spencer Charters as Rev. Matthew Brand
- Charles D. Brown as Editor Crane

== Production ==
The Wyatt quintuplets in the movie are shown to live an idealized version of the life of the Dionne quintuplets. All of the scenes with the Wyatts were filmed in the Dionne quintuplets' home known as Quintland in Corbeil, Ontario, with their real-life nurses also present on-screen. Jean Hersholt is the only actor in the film to interact with the Dionnes.

The film's narrative is almost entirely divorced from the scenes with the Dionnes, which are largely improvised and mainly consist of the four-year-old sisters playing, or leading their everyday lives. They do sing two songs in unison, but these are not "musical numbers" in any produced sense. They have little dialogue, and as they spoke French, even less intelligible dialogue to English-language audiences. However, one of their songs is in English.

Shortly after their birth, the Dionne girls were made wards of the state and raised in a theme park type hospital situation which was across the street from their parents home. The parents would visit, but rarely interact with the children directly, and the raising of the children was by nurses and doctors. For the first nine years of their life, the Dionne quintuplets children were treated like a zoo attraction. While they were under state care, they made this movie and its predecessor, The Country Doctor, both featuring Jean Hersholt as their kindly caretaker, Dr. John Luke.
