= John Nihmey =

Canadian author

John Nihmey (September 22, 1951 – December 20, 2013) was an author and founding partner of the communications firm NIVA Inc. He authored a widely syndicated travel feature in the late 1970s, co-authored a book about the Dionne Quintuplets, and authored a book about the death of an Aboriginal woman. Nihmey is listed in Who's Who in Canada. He had two children.

== Early life ==
Nihmey was born in Ottawa and grew up working in his family's diner. His father, Philip Nihmey, died when he was nine, requiring that he and his four brothers help his mother (Lily Monsour: 1914–2003) in the family business.

Nihmey graduated from Carleton University with a Bachelor of Arts, Honours in English in 1976. His first writing assignments were covering outdoor festival events in Ottawa for the Ottawa Journal.

== Hotels of the World ==
In 1976, Nihmey wrote a feature article about the Beverly Hills Hotel in Beverly Hills, California for the Ottawa Citizen. The feature caught the attention of a Toronto Star Syndicate editor, who suggested that Nihmey independently syndicate the story and a monthly series on great hotels to newspapers across Canada. Within a year John Nihmey's Hotels of the World was syndicated in 15 Canadian newspapers and later in the Northeastern United States.

Over the next three years, Nihmey visited more than 40 countries, writing about Hôtel Ritz Paris, The Peninsula Hong Kong, The Pierre in New York, the Negresco in Nice, France and La Mamounia in Marrakesh. He appeared as a regular on CTV's Canada AM and was a guest on other television and radio shows. Nihmey's special features also appeared in The Globe and Mail, the Book of Lists, and Travel + Leisure. He discontinued the series in 1980.

== Time of Their Lives: The Dionne Tragedy ==
Nihmey and co-author Stuart Foxman wrote Time of Their Lives: The Dionne Tragedy, a novel that looked at the Dionne Quintuplets story from the parents' perspective. The book chronicled the events leading to the alleged government exploitation of the children and the marginalization of the parents. The book was released in Canada in 1986 by Macmillan of Canada. The Toronto Star stated that readers "will read and weep" while the Globe and Mail said the book was "vindication for the Dionne parents". Literary Guild bought book club rights and Bantam bought paperback rights. The book was released in the US the following year, again to critical acclaim, with book club and paperback rights also acquired. Nihmey and Stuart appeared on in an exclusive interview by Bryant Gumbel on NBC's Today Show.

Film rights were purchased in 1987, leading to the 1994 CBS/CBC miniseries, Million Dollar Babies. The book was re-released to tie-in with the television broadcast.

== Fireworks and Folly ==
Nihmey wrote and published (Hushion House/General Publishing) the non-fiction narrative, Fireworks and Folly: How We Killed Minnie Sutherland, in 1998. The book is a mosaic of Nihmey's narrative with police records, inquest testimony, personal interviews, and media excerpts about the life and death of Minnie Sutherland, a woman of First Nations ancestry..

The book was launched at the Press Club in Ottawa and John was introduced by Assembly of First Nations Chief, Ovide Mercredi. The Globe and Mail said the book was "must reading for all Canadians".

TVO Studio Two produced a documentary on the book with an interview of Nihmey. The book was also published in French by Vent l'ouest. A film project was in early development.

== NIVA Inc. ==
Nihmey was a co-founding partner of NIVA Inc., a technical and scientific communications firm. Started in 1981, Nihmey was involved in communications for health sciences, science and technology, and transportation safety. Nihmey worked as Director of Marketing Communications for the firm.

== Current projects ==
Nihmey wrote a screenplay based on his years as syndicated travel journalist writing Hotels of the World. The screenplay is called Johnny Diamond. He also consulted on the development of Fireworks and Folly as a motion picture.
