= John Qualen =

Canadian-American actor (1899–1987)

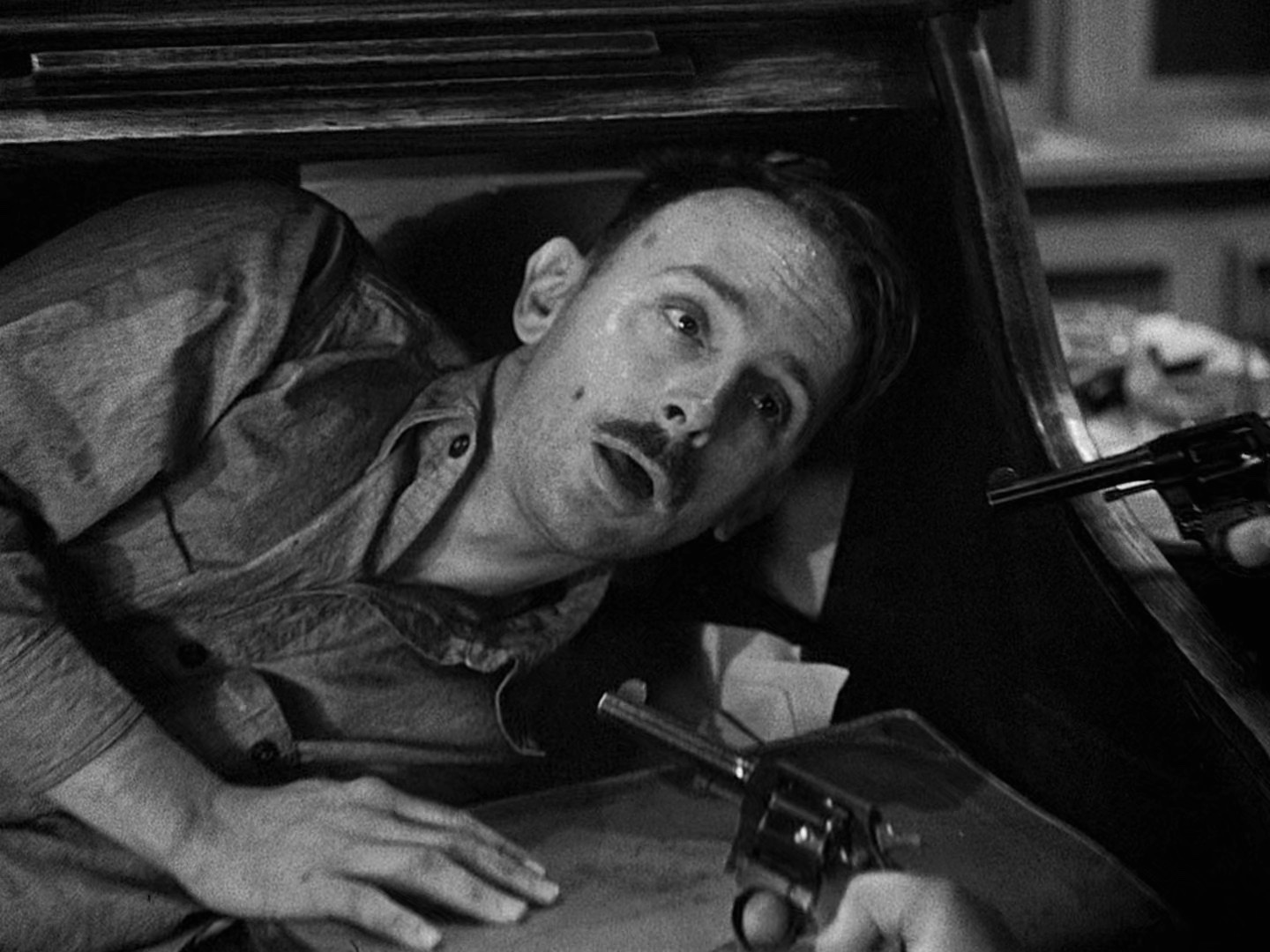
- Qualen in His Girl Friday (1940)
- Born: Johan Mandt Kvalen; December 8, 1899; Vancouver, British Columbia, Canada
- Died: September 12, 1987 (aged 87); Torrance, California, U.S.
- Resting place: Forest Lawn Memorial Park, Glendale, California, U.S. Great Mausoleum, Sanctuary of Reliance, Crypt 9632
- Other names: John M. Qualen; John T. Qualen
- Occupation: Actor
- Years active: 1931–1974
- Spouse: Pearle Larson (m. 1924)
- Children: 3

John Qualen (born Johan Mandt Kvalen, December 8, 1899 – September 12, 1987) was a Canadian-American character actor of Norwegian heritage who specialized in Scandinavian roles.

== Early years ==
Qualen was born in Vancouver, British Columbia, the son of immigrants from Norway; his father was a Lutheran minister. Some sources give Oleson as the family's original name, later Oleson Kvalen as Qualen's earlier surnames. His father's ministering meant many moves and John was 20 when he graduated from Elgin (Illinois) High School in 1920. Qualen attended the University of Toronto for four years, but he left to join a Toronto-based traveling troupe as an actor.

== Career ==
In a Milwaukee Journal interview he said he needed to start working and did so with the Chautauqua Circuit. He drove stakes for the tent used for presentations until a night in Ripon, Wisconsin, when the scheduled principal lecturer did not arrive. Qualen replaced the missing man after he showed the Chautauqua manager a medal he had won for oratory as a high school student. Not long after that, he formed his own troupe, The Qualen Concert Company. At the conclusion of a tour following his marriage, Qualen and his wife, Pearle, formed a company to produce plays. The group's stops in a two-year tour included Boston, Chicago, and New Orleans. The Qualens' income was low enough that he sold cookware in New York for additional funds. Using a handcart to move the merchandise, he made more money from sales than from his acting.

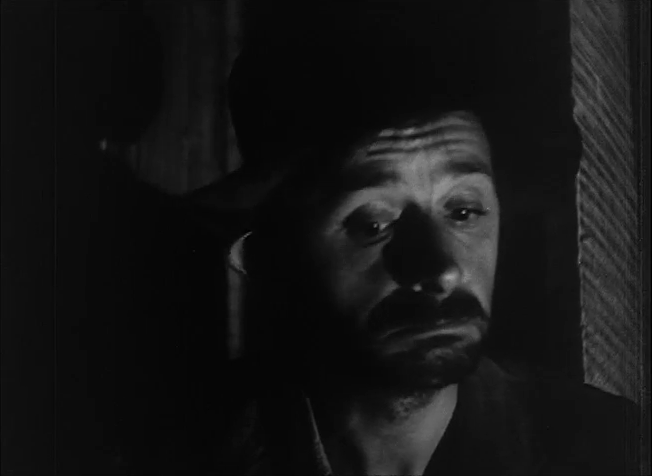
Qualen in The Grapes of Wrath (1940)

Eventually reaching Broadway, he gained his big break there in 1929, when he was cast as the Swedish janitor Carl Olsen in Elmer Rice's play Street Scene. His movie career began when he re-created the role two years later in the film adaptation of the stage production. That screen performance was followed by his appearance in John Ford's Arrowsmith (1931), which began a more than 35-year membership in the director's "stock company", with supporting roles in The Searchers (1956), Two Rode Together (1961), The Man Who Shot Liberty Valance (1962) and Cheyenne Autumn (1964).

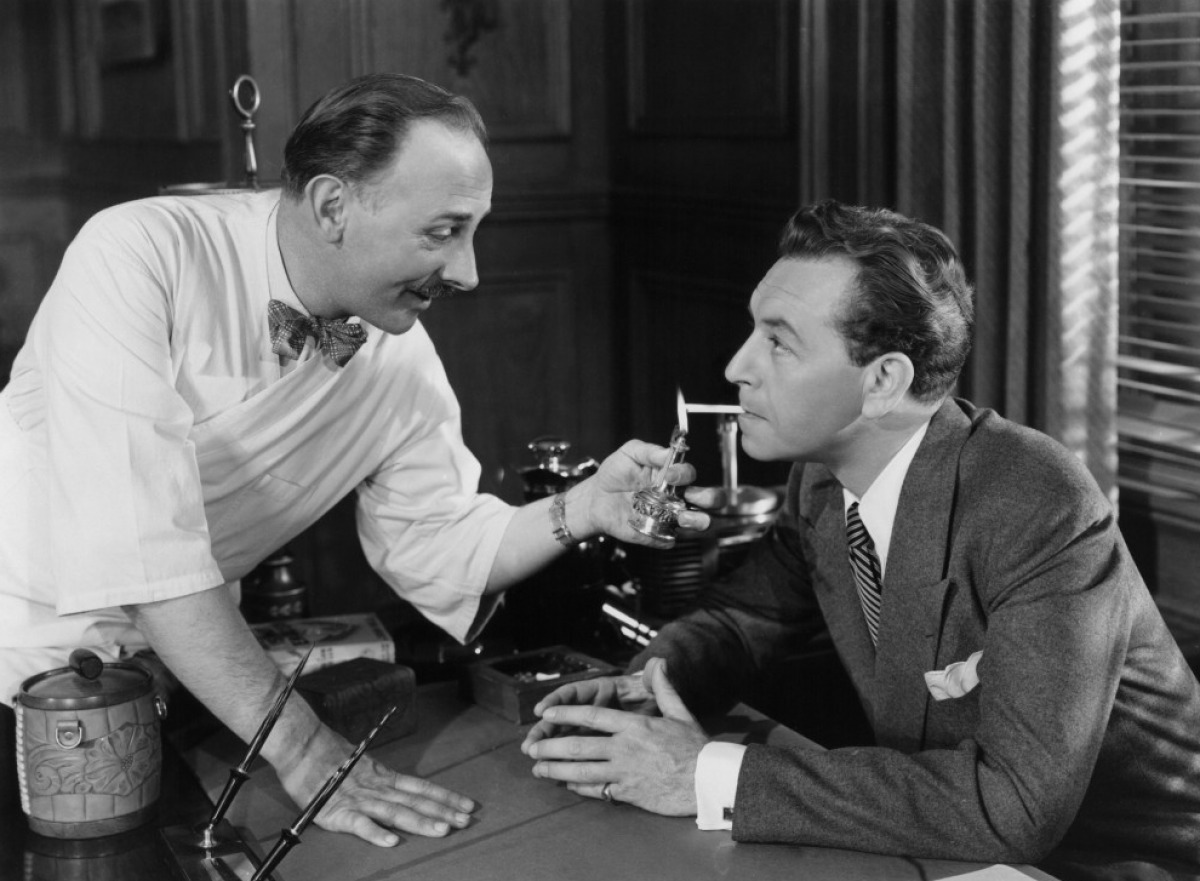
Qualen (left) and Paul Henreid in Hollow Triumph (1948)

Appearing in well over one hundred films, and acting on television into the 1970s, Qualen performed many of his roles with various accents, usually Scandinavian, often intended for comic effect. Qualen assumed a Midwestern dialect as Muley, who recounts the destruction of his farm by the bank in Ford's The Grapes of Wrath (1940), in a performance so powerful it reportedly reduced director Ford to tears; and as the confused killer Earl Williams in Howard Hawks' classic comedy His Girl Friday (1940). As Berger, the jewelry-selling Norwegian resistance member in Michael Curtiz' Casablanca (1942), he used a light Scandinavian accent, but put on a thicker Mediterranean accent as the homeward-bound fisherman Locota in William Wellman's The High and the Mighty (1954)

Qualen was also a flautist, having begun to play at age eight. He continued his musical education while at the University of Toronto and went on to play with some professional orchestras, including the Hollywood Bowl Orchestra.

Qualen was treasurer of The Authors Club and historian of The Masquers, Hollywood's social group for actors.

== Personal life and death ==
In 1924, after he became an actor, Qualen married Pearle Larson, whom he had known in high school. She joined him in the Toronto-based traveling troupe when he left university, becoming the troupe's costume mistress. The couple remained together for over 60 years, until 1987, when Qualen died at age 87 of heart failure in Torrance, California. The couple had three children, one of whom, Kathy, was an actress.

== Filmography ==
=== 1930s ===
- Street Scene (1931) as Karl Olsen
- Arrowsmith (1931) as Henry Novak (uncredited)
- The Devil's Brother (1933) as Man who owned bull (unconfirmed)
- Counsellor at Law (1933) as Johan Breitstein
- Let's Fall in Love (1933) as Svente Bjorkman (uncredited)
- Hi Nellie! (1934) as Steve (uncredited)
- No Greater Glory (1934) as Nemecsek's father
- Upper World (1934) as Chris
- Sing and Like It (1934) as Oswald
- Private Scandal (1934) as Schultz (uncredited)
- He Was Her Man (1934) as Dutch
- Our Daily Bread (1934) as Chris
- Straight Is the Way (1934) as Mr. Chapman (uncredited)
- Servants' Entrance (1934) as Detective
- 365 Nights in Hollywood (1934) as Professor Herman Ellenbogen
- Charlie Chan in Paris (1935) as Consierge
- One More Spring (1935) as Auctioneer
- The Great Hotel Murder (1935) as Ole
- Black Fury (1935) as Mike
- Chasing Yesterday (1935) as Aristide Coccoz
- Silk Hat Kid (1935) as Mr. Fossbender
- Doubting Thomas as Von Blitzer
- The Farmer Takes a Wife (1935) as Sol Tinker
- Orchids to You (1935) as Smith
- Thunder in the Night (1935) as Hotel porter
- The Three Musketeers (1935) as Planchet
- Whipsaw (1935) as Will Dabson
- Man of Iron (1935) as Collins
- Ring Around the Moon (1936) as Bill Harvey
- Wife vs. Secretary (1936) as Mr. Jenkins (uncredited)
- The Country Doctor (1936) as Asa Wyatt
- The Road to Glory (1936) as Scared soldier
- Meet Nero Wolfe (1936) as Olaf
- Girls' Dormitory (1936) as Toni
- Reunion (1936) as Asa Wyatt
- Seventh Heaven (1937) as Sewer Rat
- Angel's Holiday (1937) as Waldo Everett
- Fifty Roads to Town (1937) as Sheriff Dow
- She Had to Eat (1937) as Sleepy
- Fit for a King (1937) as Otto
- Nothing Sacred (1937) as Fireman (uncredited)
- The Bad Man of Brimstone (1937) as "Loco"
- Joy of Living (1938) as Oswego
- The Texans (1938) as Abilene Swede (uncredited)
- The Chaser (1938) as Lars
- The Mad Miss Manton (1938) as Subway worker
- Five of a Kind (1938) as Asa Wyatt
- The Strange Case of Dr. Meade (1938) as Stoner
- Stand Up and Fight (1939) as Davy
- Let Us Live (1939) as Dan (uncredited)
- Mickey the Kid (1939) as Mailman
- Career (1939) as Jeff Trotter (uncredited)
- Honeymoon in Bali (1939) as Meek man
- Thunder Afloat (1939) as Milo
- Four Wives (1939) as Frank

=== 1940s ===
- His Girl Friday (1940) as Earl Williams
- The Grapes of Wrath (1940) as Muley Graves
- Blondie on a Budget (1940) as Mr. Ed Fuddle
- Saturday's Children (1940) as First carpenter (uncredited)
- Ski Patrol (1940) as Gustaf
- On Their Own (1940) as Peters
- Babies for Sale (1940) as Howard Anderson
- Angels Over Broadway (1940) as Charles Engle
- Knute Rockne, All American (1940) Lars Knuteson Rockne
- The Long Voyage Home (1940) as Axel
- Youth Will Be Served (1940) as Clem Howie
- Model Wife (1941) as Janitor
- Million Dollar Baby (1941) as Dr. Patterson
- Out of the Fog (1941) as Olaf Johnson
- The Shepherd of the Hills (1941) as Coot Royal
- The Great Awakening (1941) as Hasslinger's Clerk
- The Devil and Daniel Webster (1941) as Miser Stevens
- Jungle Book (1942) as The Barber
- Larceny, Inc. (1942) as Sam Bachrach
- Tortilla Flat (1942) as Jose Maria Corcoran
- Casablanca (1942) as Berger
- Arabian Nights (1942) as Alladin
- Swing Shift Maisie (1943) as Horatio Curly
- The Impostor (1944) as Monge
- An American Romance (1944) as Anton Dubechek
- Dark Waters (1944) as Uncle Norbert
- Roughly Speaking (1945) as Svend Olsen
- River Gang (1945) as Uncle Bill
- Captain Kidd (1945) as Bart Blivens
- Adventure (1945) as Model T
- Song of Scheherazade (1947) as Lorenzo
- High Conquest (1947) as Peter Oberwalder Sr.
- The Fugitive (1947) as Refugee doctor
- Reaching from Heaven (1948) as The Stranger
- On Our Merry Way (1948) (deleted sequence, uncredited)
- Alias a Gentleman (1948) as No End
- My Girl Tisa (1948) as Svenson
- 16 Fathoms Deep (1948) as Capt. Athos
- Hollow Triumph (1948) as Swangon
- The Big Steal (1949) as Julius Seton

=== 1950s ===
- Captain China (1950) as Geech
- Buccaneer's Girl (1950) as Vegetable man
- Woman on the Run (1950) as Maibus
- The Jackpot (1950) as Mr. Ferguson (uncredited)
- The Flying Missile (1950) as Lars Hansen
- Belle Le Grand (1951) as Corky McGee
- Goodbye, My Fancy (1951) as Professor Dingley
- Hans Christian Andersen (1952) as Burgomaster
- Ambush at Tomahawk Gap (1953) as Jonas P. Travis
- Francis Covers the Big Town (1953) as Defense Attorney Cavendish (uncredited)
- I, the Jury (1953) as Dr. R. H. Vickers
- The High and the Mighty (1954) as Jose Locota
- The Student Prince (1954) as Willie Klauber
- Passion (1954) as Gasper Melo
- The Other Woman (1954) as Papasha
- Unchained (1955) as Leonard Haskins
- The Sea Chase (1955) as Chief Engineer Schmitt
- At Gunpoint (1955) as Livingstone
- The Searchers (1956) as Lars Jorgensen
- Johnny Concho (1956) as Jake
- The Big Land (1957) as Sven Johnson
- My World Dies Screaming (1958) as Jonah Snell
- The Gun Runners (1958) as Pop
- Revolt in the Big House (1958) as Doc
- Anatomy of a Murder (1959) as Deputy Sheriff Sulo

=== 1960s ===
- Hell Bent for Leather (1960) as Old Ben
- Elmer Gantry (1960) as Sam, a storekeeper (uncredited)
- North to Alaska (1960) as Logger Judge
- Two Rode Together (1961) as Ole Knudsen
- The Man Who Shot Liberty Valance (1962) as Peter Erickson
- Donovan's Reef (1963) as Deckhand (uncredited)
- The Prize (1963) as Oscar
- 7 Faces of Dr. Lao (1964) as Luther Lindquist
- Cheyenne Autumn (1964) as Svenson (uncredited)
- Those Calloways (1965) as Ernie Evans
- I'll Take Sweden (1965) as Olaf
- The Sons of Katie Elder (1965) as Charlie Biller
- A Patch of Blue (1965) as Mr. Faber
- A Big Hand for the Little Lady (1966) as Jesse Buford
- The Adventures of Bullwhip Griffin (1967) as Barber (uncredited)
- Firecreek (1968) as Hall
- P.J. (1968) as Poppa Gonowski
- Doc (1969, TV Movie) as Luke
- Hail, Hero! (1969) as Billy Hurd

=== 1970s ===
- Getting Away from It All (1972, TV Movie) as Charlie Erickson
- Wednesday Night Out (1972, TV Movie)
- Frasier, the Sensuous Lion (1973) as Old man on porch

== Television ==
- Alfred Hitchcock Presents (Season 1 Episode 14: "A Bullet for Baldwin") (1956) – Benjamin Stepp
- Alfred Hitchcock Presents (Season 1 Episode 18: "Shopping for Death") (1956) – Elmer Shore
- Alfred Hitchcock Presents (Season 1 Episode 27: "Help Wanted") (1956) – Mr. Crabtree
- Father Knows Best, episode "The Bus to Nowhere" - Old Man (1956)
- Cheyenne, episode "Deadline" – Charley Dolan (1957)
- Maverick, episode "The Lonesome Reunion" – Leland Mills (1958)
- The Californians episode "J. Jimmerson Jones, Inc."—J. Jimmerson Jones (1958)
- Sea Hunt (1960) Season 3, Episode 31
- Mister Ed, episode "Ed's New Shoes" – Axel (the Handyman) (1961)
- Bonanza, episode "Springtime" – Parley (1961)
- Maverick, episode "The Golden Fleecing" – Henry Albright (1961)
- The Andy Griffith Show, episode "The Jinx" – Henry Bennett (1962)
- Lawman, episode "Explosion" - Doc Shay (1962)
- Laramie, episode "Shadow of the Past" – Mr. Elbee (1962)
- The Real McCoys, episode "Cupid Wore a Tail" – Frank (1963)
- The Real McCoys, episode "The Other Side of the Fence" – Frank (1963)
- Make Room for Daddy, episodes "Sense of Humor" and "Call Off the Hounds" – Swenson, the Janitor (1964)
- The Virginian, episode "A Bride for Lars" – Gosta Swenson (1964)
- The Girl from U.N.C.L.E., episode "The Jewels of Topango Affair" – Dr. Elmer Spritzer (1966)
- Hazel, episode "A Question of Ethics" – Mr. Johansson (1966)
- Shane, episode "The Hant" - Old Man (1966)
- I Spy, episode "Red Sash of Courage" – Hannos (1967)
- Green Acres, episode "Eb's Romance" - Mr. Appleby (1968)
- Green Acres, episode "The Ex-Con" - Willy Dunhill (1970)
- The Odd Couple, episode "The Taste Of Money" - Sam (1971)
- Make Room for Granddaddy, episode "The Arm Wrestle" Folsom (1971)
- The Partridge Family episode "My Heart Belongs to a Two Car Garage" – The Old Man (1972)
- The F.B.I., episode "The Detonator" (1973)
- Movin' On, episode "Life Line" – Liggett (1974) (final appearance)
