= Dionne quintuplets =

Canadian quintuplets, the first known to have survived infancy

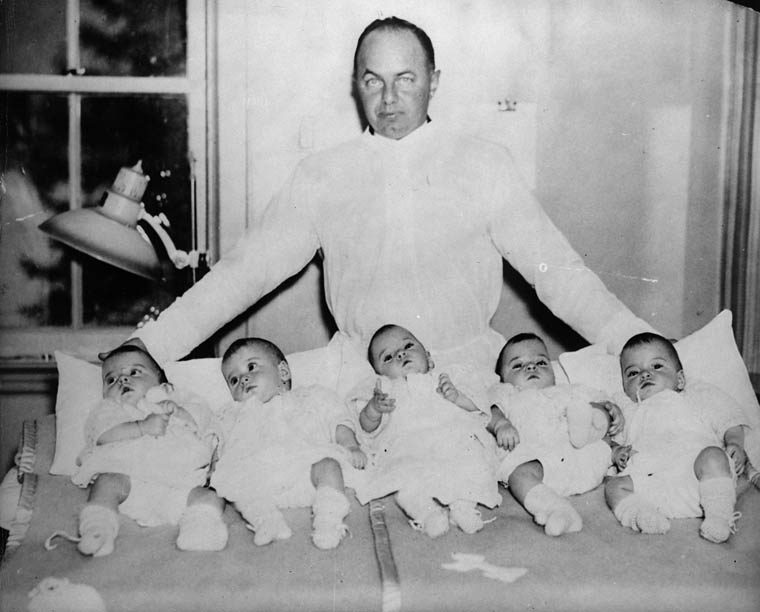
- Ontario Premier Mitchell Hepburn with the Dionne babies in 1934
- Born: Yvonne, Annette, Cécile, Émilie, Marie; May 28, 1934; Corbeil, Ontario, Canada
- Died: Émilie: August 6, 1954 (aged 20); Marie: February 27, 1970 (aged 35); Yvonne: June 23, 2001 (aged 67); Cécile: July 28, 2025 (aged 91); Annette: December 24, 2025 (aged 91)
- Known for: Being identical quintuplets
- Parents: Oliva Édouard Dionne (father); Elzire Dionne (mother)

The Dionne quintuplets (French pronunciation: [djɔn]; born May 28, 1934) were the first quintuplets known to have survived their infancy. The identical girls were born just outside Callander, Ontario, near the village of Corbeil. All five survived to adulthood.

The Dionne girls were born prematurely. After four months with their family, custody was signed over to the Red Cross, which paid for their care and oversaw the building of a hospital for the sisters. Less than a year after this agreement was signed, the Ontario government stepped in and passed the Dionne Quintuplets' Guardianship Act, 1935, which made them wards of the Crown until the age of 18. The Ontario provincial government and those around them began to profit by making them a significant tourist attraction.

== Family ==
Oliva Édouard Dionne (1904–1979) and Elzire Dionne (née Legros; 1909–1986) married on September 15, 1925, and lived on a farm near Corbeil, Ontario. They were a French Canadian farming family and had fourteen children, all born at home. Together they had six sons and eight daughters. One son, Léo Dionne, died of pneumonia shortly after birth, while the remaining thirteen children survived to adulthood. Before the quintuplets were born in 1934, Oliva and Elzire had six children. After the quintuplets, they had three more sons. Their children are listed below in birth order.

Children of Oliva and Elzire Dionne
Birth order	Child	Born	Died	Age at death	Notes
1	Ernest Dionne	1926	1995	approx. 68–69	Eldest child
2	Rose Marie Dionne	1928	1995	approx. 66–67	
3	Thérèse Dionne	1929	2021	approx. 91–92	
4	Léo Dionne	1930	1930	Infancy	Died of pneumonia shortly after birth
5	Daniel Dionne	1932	1995	approx. 62–63	
6	Pauline Dionne	1933	2018	approx. 84–85	Eleven months older than the quintuplets
7	Yvonne Édouilda Marie Dionne	1934	2001	67	First-born quintuplet
8	Annette Lillianne Marie Dionne	1934	2025	91	Second-born quintuplet
9	Cécile Marie Émilda Dionne	1934	2025	91	Third-born quintuplet
10	Émilie Marie Jeanne Dionne	1934	1954	20	Fourth-born quintuplet
11	Marie Reine Alma Dionne	1934	1970	35	Fifth-born quintuplet
12	Oliva Dionne Jr.	1936	2017	approx. 80–81	
13	Victor Dionne	1938	2007	approx. 68–69	
14	Claude Dionne	1946	2009	approx. 62–63	Youngest child

== Pregnancy and delivery ==
In 1933, Elzire Dionne was 24 years old when she became pregnant with the quintuplets. Living on the family's farm near Corbeil, Ontario, she believed she was expecting twins, as naturally conceived quintuplets were not thought possible at the time. During her pregnancy she experienced severe fluid retention and anaemia. During her third month, she later recalled suffering painful cramps and passing what she thought was the remains of another fetus. Later authors suggested this may have been a sixth fetus that did not survive.

Like many women living in rural northern Ontario during the early 1930s, Elzire had little access to prenatal care. Based on the size and appearance of her abdomen, her physician, Dr. Allan Roy Dafoe, believed her pregnancy involved a fetal abnormality rather than multiple babies. Neither Elzire nor her doctors realized she was carrying quintuplets until labour began during the night of May 28, 1934.

When labour began, Elzire's husband, Oliva Dionne, summoned Dr. Dafoe and two local midwives, Donalda "Aunt Donalda" Groulx and Madame Benoît Lebel, to assist with the delivery. The quintuplets were born prematurely, but all five survived the delivery. Following the birth, Elzire went into shock but recovered within two hours.

== The newborn quintuplets ==
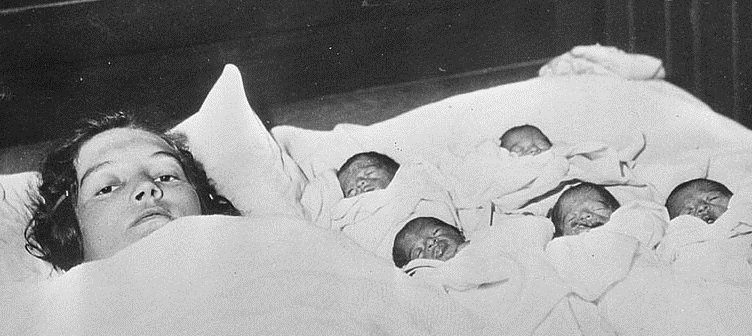
Elzire Dionne with her five newborn daughters shortly after their birth on May 28, 1934.

Born prematurely on May 28, 1934, together the quintuplets weighed 13 pounds 6 ounces (6.1 kg) at birth. The heaviest weighed 3 pounds 4 ounces (1.5 kg), while the lightest weighed 2 pounds 4 ounces (1.0 kg). Their individual weights and measurements were not recorded.

Immediately after birth, the quintuplets were wrapped in cotton sheets and old napkins and placed together in the corner of their parents' bed. They were then moved to a wicker basket borrowed from neighbours, covered with heated blankets, and taken to the family's kitchen, where they were kept warm beside the open stove. During their first 24 hours, they were massaged with olive oil and fed water sweetened with corn syrup every two hours. By the second day, they had been moved to a larger laundry basket lined with hot-water bottles and were being fed a formula made from cow's milk, boiled water, corn syrup, and small amounts of rum, which was then believed to act as a stimulant. They were watched constantly and often had to be roused.

Later research confirmed that the sisters had developed from a single fertilized egg, making them identical quintuplets. Émilie and Marie had shared one amniotic sac, while Annette and Yvonne had shared another. Based on their mother Elzire Dionne's account of her pregnancy, later authors suggested that Cécile may have shared an amniotic sac with a sixth fetus that did not survive. Researchers also found that all but Émilie were right-handed, while all but Marie had a counterclockwise hair whorl.

== Public reception and support ==
News of the unusual birth spread quickly, sparked by Oliva's brother's inquiry to the local newspaper editor about how much he would charge for an announcement of five babies at a single birth. Before long, people from all over North America were offering assistance. Individuals sent supplies and well-meant advice. A famous letter from Appalachia recommended tiny doses of burnt rye whisky to prevent diarrhea. Charlie Blake, a reporter from the Chicago American newspaper, found an old incubator from 1895 that did not run on electricity and brought it to the Dionne home, which lacked electricity.

A second incubator was brought by the Toronto Star newspaper, which had three more built from antique blueprints. Assistance was offered by women who donated their breast milk to the quintuplets. The women were compensated for their donations, receiving ten cents per ounce of milk donated. This allowed women to help with household income during the Great Depression. Once the milk was received, it was preserved and sent by train to the quintuplets. Dr. Alan Brown of Toronto's Hospital for Sick Children ensured that twenty-eight ounces of breast milk was delivered to the quintuplets each morning.

== Removal from family ==
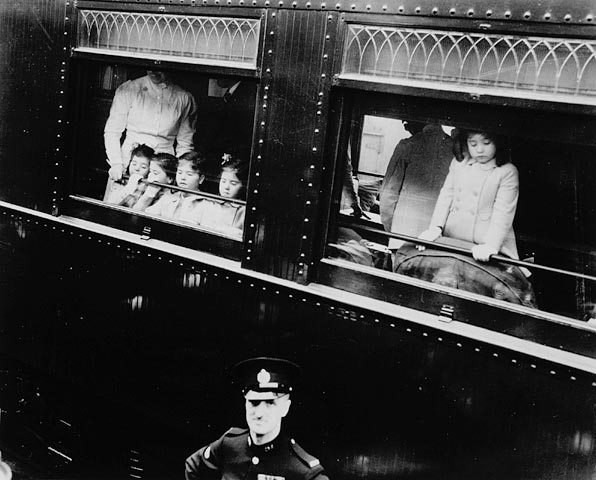
Leaving Toronto after presentation to Queen Elizabeth, 1939

At two months old, the Dionne quintuplets were removed from their parents' care after Oliva and Elzire Dionne signed a temporary two-year agreement placing the sisters under the guardianship of the Canadian Red Cross. Although intended to protect the quintuplets while a legal dispute was resolved, the agreement marked the beginning of their separation from their family for most of their childhood.

The agreement followed a dispute over a contract to exhibit the quintuplets at Chicago's Century of Progress exposition. Within days of the sisters' birth in May 1934, promoters approached their father, Oliva Dionne, seeking permission to display the babies. At the time, exhibiting premature infants in incubator shows at fairs and exhibitions was not uncommon. On the advice of their physician, Dr. Allan Roy Dafoe, and the family priest, Father Daniel Routhier, Oliva initially agreed to the contract but attempted to cancel it a few days later, arguing that it was invalid because his wife, Elzire, had not signed it. The promoters disputed his claim.

In July 1934, the Dionnes agreed to place the quintuplets in the temporary care of the Canadian Red Cross. In return, the Red Cross assumed responsibility for all medical expenses, paid the nurses' wages, arranged for donated breast milk, supplied equipment, and oversaw the construction of a hospital and nursery built specifically for the sisters.

In February 1935, Oliva and Elzire travelled to Chicago, where they appeared on stage as the parents of the "world famous babies". Shortly afterwards, Ontario Premier Mitchell Hepburn argued that the trip demonstrated the need for stronger government intervention to protect the children from commercial interests. In March 1935, the Ontario legislature passed the Dionne Quintuplets' Guardianship Act, making the sisters wards of the Crown until they reached age 18.

Oliva Dionne was appointed to the four-member Board of Guardians but rarely attended meetings, believing that his vote carried little weight against the other three guardians: Dr. Allan Roy Dafoe, Judge Joseph Valin of North Bay, and Minister of Welfare David Croll. Meeting monthly, the board assumed control of the quintuplets' care and business affairs. Although the legislation was presented as a measure to protect the sisters from commercial exploitation, the provincial government soon developed the tourist attraction that became known as Quintland.

== Dafoe Nursery ==
The girls were moved from the farmhouse to this nursery on September 21, 1934, and lived there until they were nine years old. It was a nine-room nursery with a staff house nearby. The staff house held the three nurses and the three police in charge of guarding them, while a housekeeper and two maids lived in the main building with the quintuplets.

The Dionne sisters were constantly tested, studied, and examined, with records taken of everything. While living at the compound, they had a somewhat rigid lifestyle. They were not required to participate in chores and were privately tutored in the same building where they lived. Cared for primarily by nurses, they had limited exposure to the world outside the boundaries of the compound. They also had occasional contact with their parents and siblings across the road. When their parents were allowed in the nursery, they argued with the nurses. Elzire pushed the nurses and objected to the foods that they were fed.

Every morning they dressed together in a big bathroom, drank orange juice and cod liver oil, then had their hair curled. They then said a prayer, a gong sounded, and they ate breakfast in the dining room. After 30 minutes, they cleared the table. They then played in the sunroom for 30 minutes, took a 15-minute break, and at nine o'clock had their morning inspection with Dr. Dafoe. Every month, they had a different timetable of activities. They bathed every day before dinner and put on their pyjamas. Dinner was served at precisely six o'clock. They then went into the quiet playroom to say their evening prayers. Each girl had a colour and a symbol to mark whatever belonged to her. Annette's colour was red and her design a maple leaf, Cécile's green and a turkey. Émilie had white and a tulip, Marie blue and a teddy bear, and Yvonne pink and a bluebird.

== Quintland ==
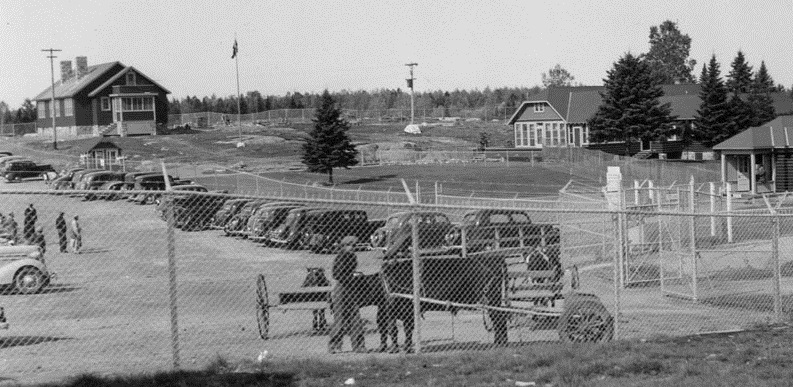
General view of the Dionne Quintuplets' nursery complex and grounds, with visitor parking in the foreground.

The Dionne quintuplets spent much of their childhood at the centre of Quintland, a government-operated tourist attraction built around the Dafoe Nursery. Constructed through a Canadian Red Cross fundraising campaign, the nursery became the centrepiece of one of Canada's largest tourist attractions during the Great Depression. From 1935 until the sisters returned to their family in 1943, millions of people travelled to Northern Ontario to observe them.

When public visits first began, tourists viewed the quintuplets through a window of the Dafoe Nursery. Their caregivers soon concluded that this arrangement upset the girls, who became excited when visitors arrived and distressed when they left. Asking visitors to remain quiet proved ineffective, and the sisters were initially exhibited four times each day.

The public observatory opened on Canada Day in 1936, when the sisters were two years old. Visitors passed through a covered arcade surrounding the nursery's outdoor playground, where the girls were brought outside for scheduled public viewings. The playground formed part of the nursery compound, which was enclosed by a seven-foot (7 feet (2.1 m)) barbed-wire fence. Visitors were instructed to remain silent, not speak to the girls, continue moving to avoid congestion, and refrain from taking photographs. The sisters were not exhibited during poor weather. Although one-way screens were intended to prevent noise and distraction, they functioned more like frosted glass. The girls knew they were being watched because they could hear the screams and laughter of the crowds, even if they could not clearly see them. Only five people were permitted in a room with the quintuplets at one time, and anyone admitted was sprayed with disinfectant.

Approximately 3,000 people visited Quintland each day, and almost three million passed through the observation gallery between 1936 and 1943. Hundreds of automobiles arrived daily, and ample parking was provided for visitors. At its height, Quintland surpassed the Canadian side of Niagara Falls to become Ontario's largest tourist attraction and was rivalled in North America only by Radio City Music Hall in New York City, Mount Vernon in Virginia, and Gettysburg National Military Park in Pennsylvania.

Visitors included actors Clark Gable, James Stewart, Bette Davis, James Cagney, and Mae West, as well as aviator Amelia Earhart, who visited nearby Callander, Ontario, six weeks before her disappearance in 1937.

The attraction generated more than $50 million in tourist revenue for Ontario. Across the road from the Dafoe Nursery, the sisters' father, Oliva Dionne, operated souvenir shops serving the steady stream of tourists who came to see his daughters.

More than 30 years later, the surviving sisters reflected on their childhood at Quintland in their autobiography We Were Five, writing, "We dwelt at the center of a circus. A carnival set in the middle of nowhere." In a 2017 interview, Cécile Dionne later said of the daily public exhibitions, "It wasn't good for the children to be like that, to be shown like that, playing naturally and knowing that other people were looking. It was sort of theft from us."

== Merchandise and souvenirs ==
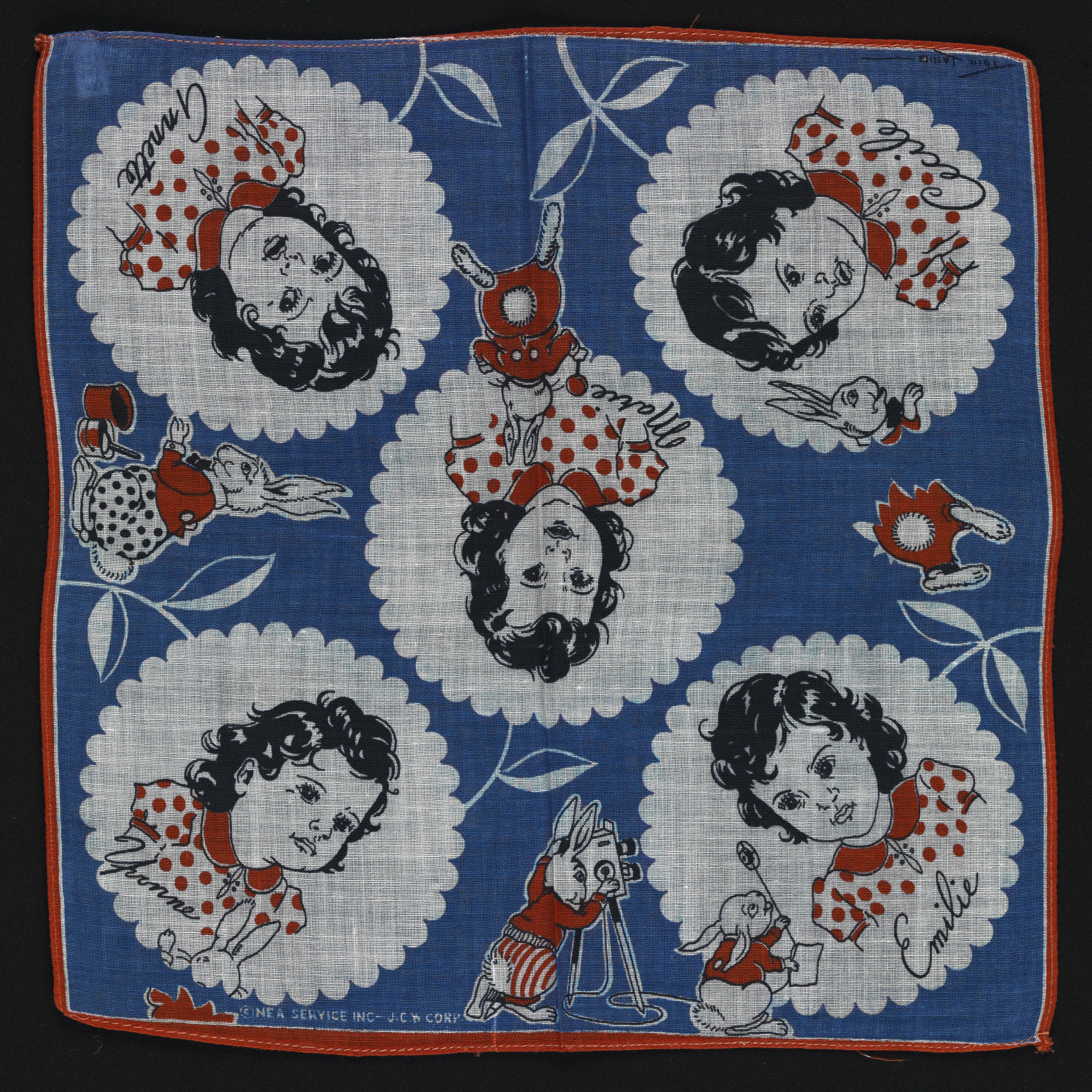
Souvenir handkerchief depicting the Dionne quintuplets, circa 1942

As Quintland developed into one of Canada's most popular tourist attractions during the late 1930s, a thriving souvenir industry grew up around the quintuplets. Opposite the Dafoe Nursery, their father, Oliva Dionne, operated both a souvenir shop and a woollen store that served the thousands of tourists who travelled to Corbeil, Ontario, each year.

By the late 1930s, shops in Quintland sold a wide variety of merchandise bearing the sisters' names or likenesses, including autographs, framed photographs, postcards, books, dolls, candy bars, handkerchiefs, and household items such as spoons, cups, plates, and plaques.

Among the most unusual souvenirs were small stones collected from the area and promoted as possessing magical fertility powers. The stones were offered free of charge in bins that reportedly had to be refilled almost every day because so many people took them home.

During the same period, some women hoping to conceive also sought to touch the quintuplets' mother, Elzire Dionne, believing that contact with her would improve their chances of becoming pregnant. Two of the midwives who had assisted at the quintuplets' birth, Madame LeGros and Madame Lebel, later worked in souvenir shops serving Quintland tourists.

Many of these souvenirs have survived and are now preserved in museums and private collections. In 2019, California collector Carol Fraser donated Dionne memorabilia valued at approximately US$20,000 to the Dionne Quints Home Museum in North Bay, Ontario. Over many years, Fraser and her sisters assembled eight sets of dolls, photographs, spoons, bowls, handkerchiefs, doll furniture, and other artifacts. Fraser recalled receiving two Dionne souvenir handkerchiefs as a Christmas gift during her childhood, saying, "I remember, one Christmas, my mother gave me two hankies, and she said she paid more for those than she had ever paid for a dress." Explaining why she donated the material, Fraser said, "I think the Dionne collection should go home."

== Product promotion ==
The sisters, their likenesses and images, along with Dr. Dafoe, were used to publicize commercial products including Karo corn syrup, Quaker Oats, Lysol, Palmolive soap, Colgate, Aluminum Goods Manufacturing Co., Beehive Corn Syrup, Canada Starch Company, Carnation Milk, Colgate-Palmolive-Peet Co., Corn Products Refining and Crown Brand Corn Syrup, and Baby Ruth. They promoted the sales of condensed milk, toothpaste, disinfectant, candy bars, and many other products.

== Publications and media ==
Beginning in 1936, when the quintuplets were 2 years old, they appeared in three Hollywood feature films produced by 20th Century Fox: The Country Doctor (1936), Reunion (1936), and Five of a Kind (1938). In all three films, they portrayed the fictional "Wyatt quintuplets", while actor Jean Hersholt portrayed Dr. John Luke, a character based on Dr. Allan Roy Dafoe. In the first two films, the quintuplets' scenes were filmed at Quintland and largely consisted of them playing and interacting with one another rather than acting. Both films focused primarily on the fictional physician who cared for the Wyatt family rather than on the quintuplets themselves.

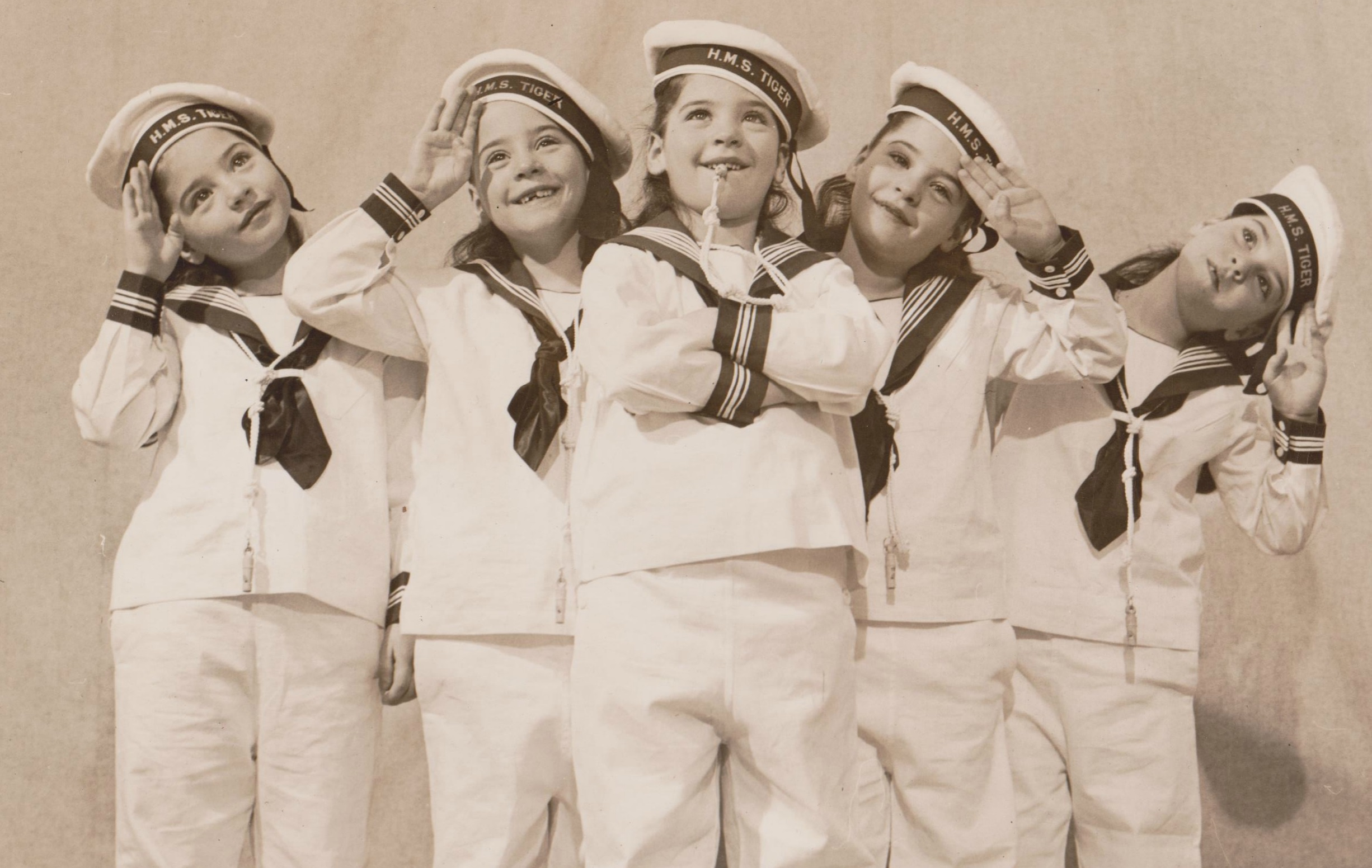
Dionne Quintuplets, aged six.

The quintuplets also appeared in numerous newsreels. In 1939, at age 5, they starred in the short documentary Five Times Five, which was nominated for the Academy Award for Best Short Subject (Two-reel) at the 12th Academy Awards. Three years later, in 1942, at age 8, they appeared in one of James A. Fitzpatrick's Traveltalks, Land of the Quintuplets, filmed shortly before they were returned to their parents' custody.

After reaching adulthood, the four surviving sisters, Annette Dionne, Cécile Dionne, Marie Dionne and Yvonne Dionne, collaborated with author James Brough on the autobiography We Were Five, published in 1965.

Interest in the quintuplets continued in later decades. In 1977, Canadian historian Pierre Berton published The Dionne Years: A Thirties Melodrama. The following year he narrated a National Film Board of Canada documentary about the sisters. In 1986, John Nihmey and Stuart Foxman published the novel Time of Their Lives—The Dionne Tragedy, which was adapted into the 1994 CBC and CBS miniseries Million Dollar Babies.

More than 60 years after becoming internationally known, the three surviving sisters, Annette Dionne, Cécile Dionne and Yvonne Dionne, published an open letter in 1997 to the parents of the McCaughey septuplets, warning against allowing excessive publicity for their children.

The following year, in 1998, Cécile Dionne, Annette Dionne and Yvonne Dionne participated in the hour-long documentary Full Circle: The Untold Story of the Dionne Quintuplets, written and directed by Maya Gallus and broadcast on the CBC documentary series Life & Times.

== Dr. Allan Roy Dafoe ==
Until the quintuplets' birth, Dafoe was a country doctor. He received additional attention when he delivered the quintuplets and was seen as a doctor having much knowledge on child care and health. Until 1942, when Dafoe retired, he was known as the world's best doctor. He wrote a book and numerous pamphlets and had a radio broadcast, all with the intention of helping mothers with infant care. His broadcasts were sponsored by companies and brands such as Lysol, which was seen as effective at preventing infections for newborn babies. Mothers were highly appreciative of Dr. Dafoe's advice as they were actively looking for advice from professionals in the health care or child care fields. Eventually Dafoe was viewed as taking advantage of his newly-come fame. He spent large amounts of money and was removed as one of the three primary caretakers of the quintuplets. This removal involved Oliva Dionne as he took legal action to regain custody over his children. The general public did not know that Dafoe profited $182,466 in 1943 (equivalent to $3,328,991 in 2025).

== Return to family ==
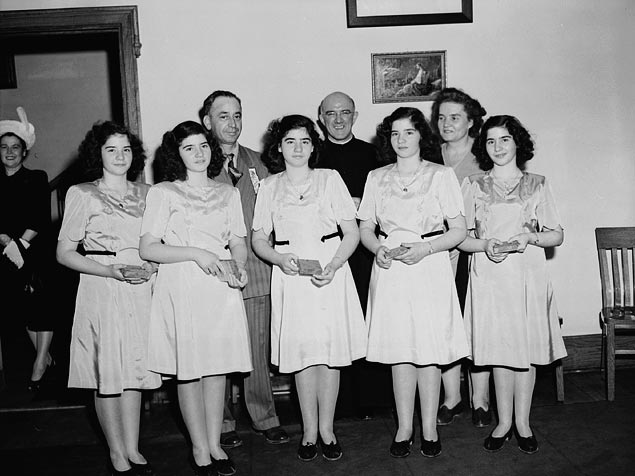
The quintuplets in 1947 with their parents and a priest in the background

By 1939, Dr. Dafoe had resigned as guardian, and Oliva Dionne was gaining more support to have his family reunited. The family was reunited because the girls’ parents made efforts to regain custody of their children. Also, the Catholic Church and French-speaking communities in both Quebec and Ontario pressured the government to give Oliva Dionne custody. These efforts and pressure stemmed from the fact that the Dionnes had never agreed to the removal of the quintuplets from their custody.

In 1942, the Dionne family moved into the nursery with the quintuplets while they waited for their new home to be completed. In November 1943, the entire Dionne family moved into their new home. The yellow brick, 20-room mansion was paid for from the quintuplets' fund. The home had many amenities that were considered luxuries at the time, including telephones, electricity, and hot water and was nicknamed "The Big House". The building is now a retirement home.

The nursery was eventually converted into an accredited school house where the sisters finished their secondary education along with ten Roman Catholic girls from the area who were chosen to attend. In later years, the old Dafoe Hospital was used by the Recluses of Corbeil as a convent.

== Family struggles ==
When the family was reunited, many struggles followed. The quintuplets felt distanced from their siblings. They struggled to communicate as the family spoke French while the quintuplets were brought up in English under Dr. Dafoe. Once Oliva received custody, he wanted attention. He made police accompany his vehicle as he took the quintuplets out, constantly drawing attention to them and himself.

While the parents claimed that they wished to integrate the quintuplets into the family, the sisters frequently travelled to perform at various functions and still dressed identically. According to the accounts of the surviving sisters, the parents often treated them at home as a five-part unit and frequently lectured them about the trouble they had caused the family by existing. They claimed physical abuse at the hands of their mother. They were unaware for many years that the lavish house, the expensive food, and the series of cars the family enjoyed were paid for with money they themselves had earned, but they were aware that their upbringing meant they would never feel truly part of the large Dionne family and called their time in the Big House, "the saddest home we ever knew".

In particular, Oliva Dionne was resentful and suspicious of outsiders as a result of his having lost custody of the girls. In 1995, the three surviving sisters alleged that their father had sexually abused them during their teenage years. He bought liniment claiming it would help with Yvonne's chest cold. As a 13-year-old she felt pressured to undress in front of her father. Her father rubbed the liniment on her neck, sternum, shoulders, and ribs. Then, he turned to Émilie and told her he needed to apply the liniment on her too. The quintuplets feared going for car rides with their father and felt the need to dress extra conservatively on these rides because of him. Annette wore turtlenecks to prevent her father from violating her. During car rides the girls were squished up front with their father as the back seats were in for repair. He allegedly French kissed them and put his fingers down their blouses.

== Trust fund and financial exploitation ==
A trust fund was established in the quintuplets' names shortly after their birth. As newspaper coverage and commercial interest in the sisters grew during the mid-1930s, so did the fund. In 1934, the Newspaper Enterprise Association deposited $10,000 into the trust in exchange for exclusive photographic rights for one year, preventing anyone else, including the girls' parents, from photographing them commercially during that period. Pathé News reportedly deposited between $12,000 and $15,000 for each newsreel it produced, while the Madame Alexander Doll Company agreed to contribute five percent of its sales. By the quintuplets' second birthday in May 1936, the trust fund had grown to approximately $250,000 (equivalent to $5,547,297 in 2025).

From 1935, when the quintuplets became wards of the Crown, until they reached adulthood in 1952, their guardians managed the trust fund. In later years, Annette, Cécile and Yvonne Dionne said they had known little about their finances while growing up and later discovered that money from the trust had been used to pay research, food, and travel expenses associated with their public exhibition.

After leaving home in 1952, the surviving sisters said they found far less money in the trust than they believed had been earned during their childhood. In 1997, Annette, Cécile and Yvonne sought $10 million in compensation from the Government of Ontario. After rejecting settlement offers of $2 million and $3 million, they accepted a $4 million settlement in 1998. Premier Mike Harris also apologized on behalf of the province.

== Adult years ==
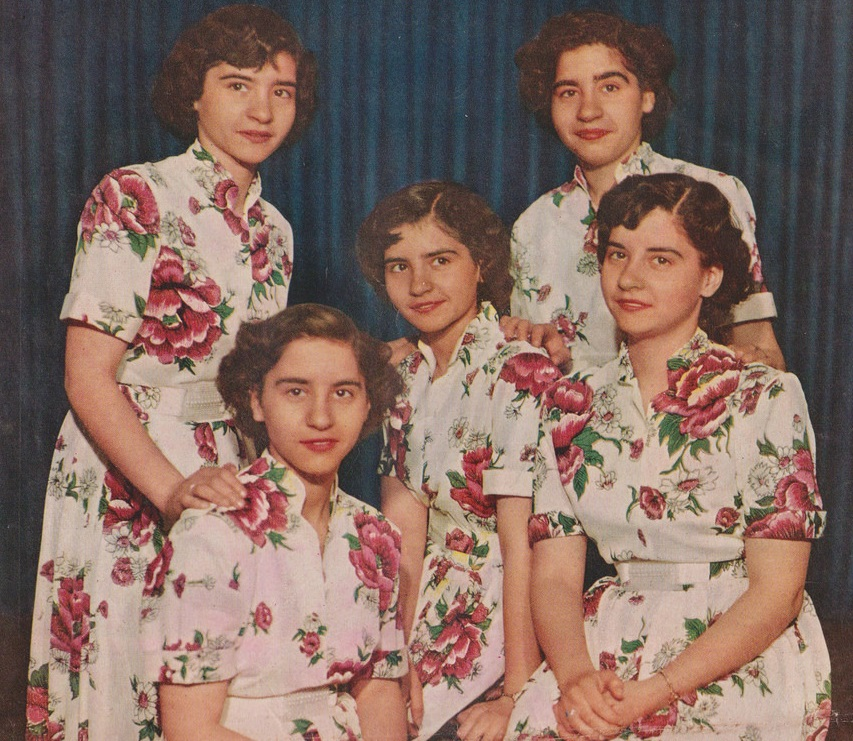
The Dionne quintuplets on the cover of the French magazine ''Paris Match'' in 1952, aged 18.

The quintuplets left the family home upon turning 18 in 1952 and had little contact with their parents afterwards. Three married and had children: Marie had two daughters, Emilie and Monique; Annette had three sons, Jean-François, Charlie, and Eric; and Cécile had five children, Claude, Patrice, twins Bruno (who died at 15 months) and Bertrand, and Elizabeth. Émilie devoted her brief life to becoming a nun. Yvonne finished nursing school before turning to sculpting, then later became a librarian.

Émilie died at age 20 as a result of a seizure. She had a series of seizures while she was a postulant at a convent and had asked not to be left unattended, but the nun who was supposed to be watching her thought she was asleep and went to Mass. Émilie had another seizure, rolled onto her stomach and, unable to raise her face from her pillow, accidentally suffocated. In 1970, Marie was living alone in an apartment and her sisters were worried after not hearing from her in several days. Her doctor went to her home and found her in bed, having been dead for days. A blood clot was found on her brain.

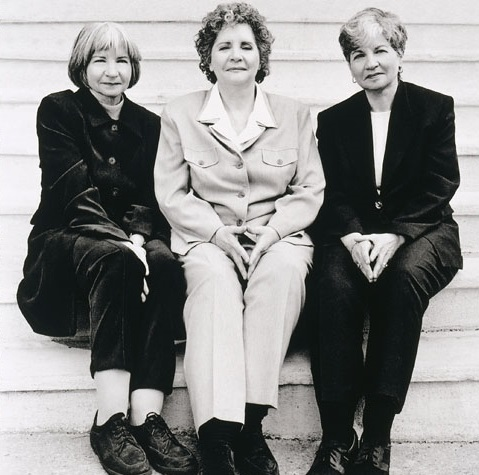
Yvonne, Cécile and Annette Dionne in 1999

The father and mother of the Dionnes, with whom the quintuplets were not close in adult life, died in 1979 and 1986 respectively. Annette and Cécile both eventually divorced, and, by the 1990s, the three surviving sisters were living together in the Montreal suburb of Saint-Bruno-de-Montarville.

Yvonne died in 2001, shortly after the sisters reached a C$4 million compensation settlement with the Government of Ontario. Thérèse, the last living sibling of the 9 Dionne siblings who were not quintuplets, died in 2021, leaving Cécile and Annette as the last two surviving Dionne siblings as well as the last two of the quintuplets.

Cécile died on July 28, 2025, at the age of 91. The last surviving quintuplet, Annette, died on December 24, 2025, also at the age of 91.

== Museums ==
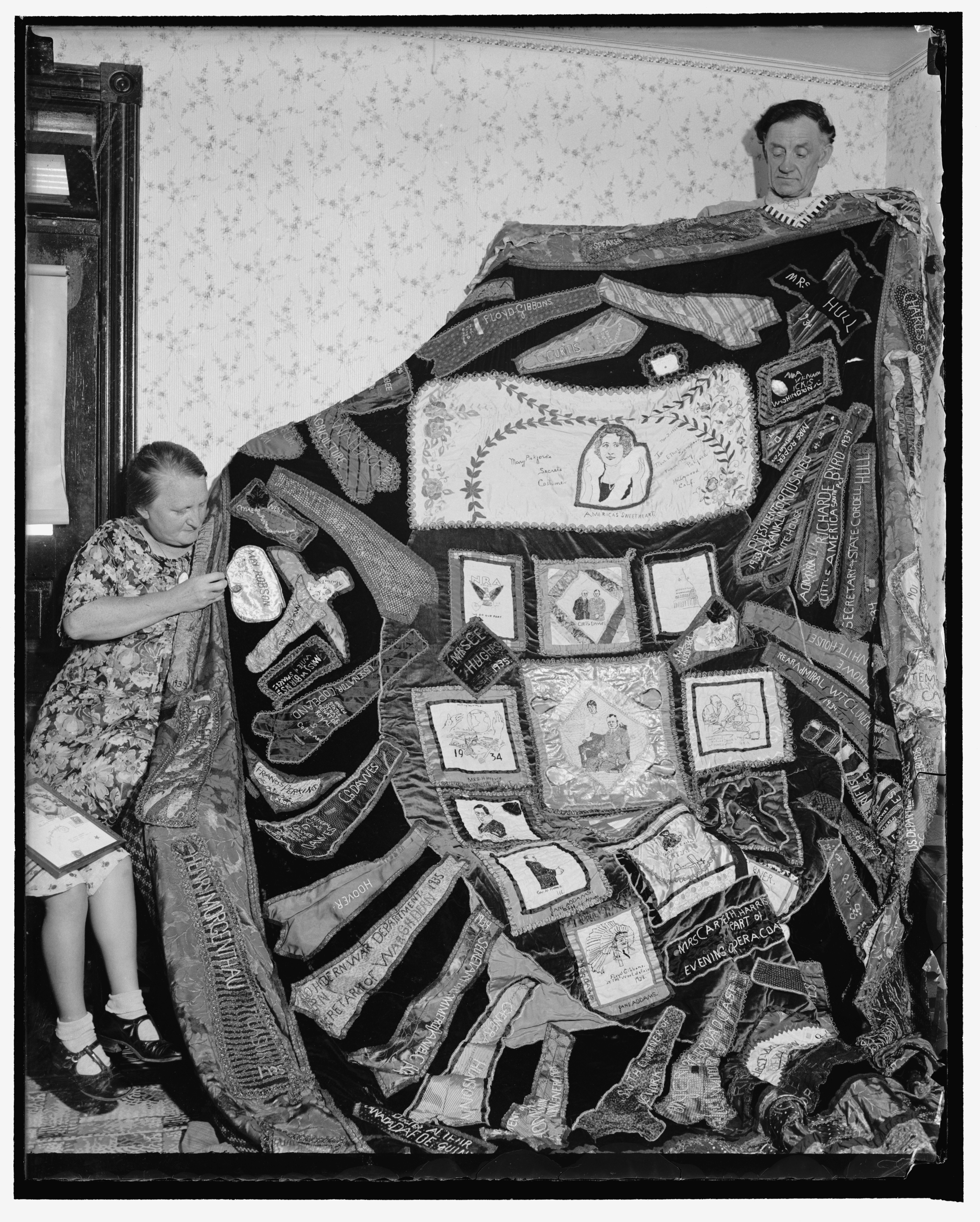
A quilt assembled by Ethel Sampson in 1937 from fabric donated by public figures, including diapers from the Dionne quintuplets.

More than 50 years after the quintuplets were born, in 1985, their birthplace became the non-profit Dionne Quintuplets Museum in North Bay, Ontario. The farmhouse had originally stood near Corbeil, Ontario, and had first been moved from its original site around 1960. For more than three decades, the museum preserved photographs, artifacts, and memorabilia documenting the quintuplets' lives.

In October 2016, the museum closed. As the City of North Bay considered declaring the building surplus, local residents organized to save it. The following year, they established the Dionne Quints Heritage Board to preserve the historic house and the sisters' legacy.

Later in 2017, the farmhouse was moved to North Bay's waterfront, between Marina Point Retirement Residence and Discovery North Bay Museum. In 2019, 85 years after the quintuplets were born, it reopened as the Dionne Quints Home Museum. Today, the museum displays photographs, artifacts, and archival materials about the sisters' lives. Its exhibits also explore their exploitation, later advocacy, and the continuing effort to preserve their story.

A second museum, the Callander Bay Heritage Museum in Callander, Ontario, occupies the former home and medical practice of Dr. Allan Roy Dafoe, who delivered the quintuplets and later served as one of their guardians. The museum includes exhibits about Dafoe, the quintuplets, and the history of Callander.

== In popular culture ==
In the movie, A Night at the Opera (1935) during the movie's famous contract-tearing scene, Groucho asks, "You know what duplicates are, don't you?" to which Chico responds, "Yeah, sure — they're five kids up in Canada," referencing the Dionne Quintuplets.

In the song I Like Bananas Because They Have No Bones (1936), recorded by George Elrick, the siblings are sung with The quintuplet bairnies, man - Those healthy five Dionnes - They a' eat bananas.

In the short story "Mandarin Jade", Raymond Chandler wrote in Chapter 3 of "an advertising calendar showing the Dionne quintuplets rolling around on a sky-blue floor". In chapter 11 of his 1939 novel The Big Sleep, Chandler described "an advertising calendar showing the Quints rolling around on a sky-blue floor, in pink dresses, with seal-brown hair and sharp black eyes as large as mammoth prunes".

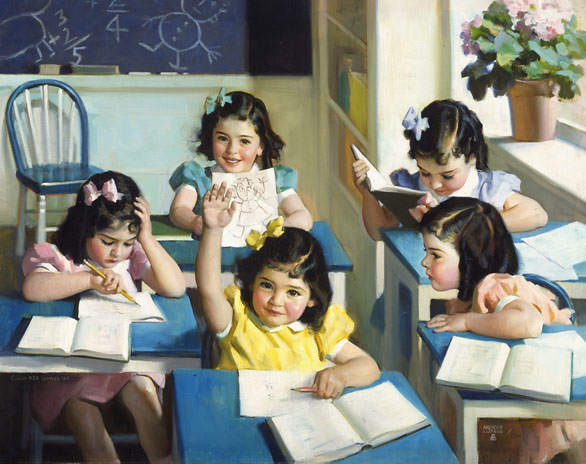
Dionne Quintuplets – School Days, painting by Andrew Loomis, 1938

Canadian mystery writer Louise Penny said the fictional Ouellet quintuplets in her book How The Light Gets In "were certainly inspired by the Dionne girls".

Three of the Dionne quintuplets (Marie, Annette, Yvonne) were referenced by Curly Howard in the Three Stooges short "False Alarms", saying, "Look at the little baby hoses, quintuplets!") released on August 16, 1936.

In Oily to Bed, Oily to Rise (1939), towards the end of the film, Moe Howard tells Curly to wish for quintuplets and Curly responds, "we'll honeymoon in Canada" with their new found loves to make the wish come true.

The Buster Keaton short "Ditto" (1937) ends with scenes set in Canada, fifteen years into the future. The final sight gag is a visual reference to the Dionne quintuplets, who are first-name-checked on the back of camp chairs in which five supposedly identical women are sitting.

In the 1937 British comedy film Oh, Mr Porter!, Will Hay's character "Porter" puns on "Murphy" telling him his wife's had quinsy (a complication of tonsillitis), replying "What, like that woman in Canada?"

Disney: Pluto's Quin-Puplets (1937) – the first animated short officially starring Pluto – was cleverly created in the wake of the 1930s craze for the quintuplets: Pluto and Fifi are seen as "Mr. And Mrs. Pluto", the parents of five mischievous mini-Plutos.

In the final scene of the 1940 film River's End, Cheeta, newly married to Andy Dijon, questions her choice of husband, complaining among other things that French Canadians do not make good papas. Her enthusiasm for the union is renewed when Andy points out that the only man in the world who is papa to five babies at the same time is French Canadian.

In the 1944 film The Miracle of Morgan's Creek, an American girl has six boys. The news makes headlines around the world. A newspaper headline is shown: "Canada Protests: 'Possible But Not Probable.' Says Premier".

In the 1945 film Duffy's Tavern, Archie, played by Ed Gardner, asks another character (Miss Duffy), "what else did you see while you were up there [in Canada], did you see the, uh, quintuplets?!"

In the 1946 Looney Tunes cartoon Baby Bottleneck, Daffy Duck is shown taking phone calls from a handful of celebrity fathers including Eddie Cantor, Bing Crosby and Oliva Dionne (who is quickly dismissed by Daffy with a curt "Mr. Dionne, puh-lease!").

Stephen Sondheim referenced the quintuplets in his song "I'm Still Here" from the musical Follies with the line "I got through Abie's Irish Rose, five Dionne babies, Major Bowes..."

A 1978 documentary Dionne Quintuplets, narrated by Pierre Berton, included news footage and interviews.

The 1994 TV miniseries Million Dollar Babies was based on the novel Time of Their Lives—The Dionne Tragedy.

The publicity around the birth and display of the quintuplets inspired the 1999 episode of The Simpsons, "Eight Misbehavin'".

The 2000 Disney Channel original movie “Quints” focuses on the dangers of the limelight for a set of quintuplets.

The season 4 Episode of South Park, Quintuplets 2000, is partially based on the Dionne quintuplets.

In 2018, the birth of the quintuplets was named a National Historic Event.

The fourth episode of the Amazon television series The Marvelous Mrs. Maisel is called "The Disappointment of the Dionne Quintuplets".

E. L. Doctorow references the quintuplets in his novel World's Fair (1985) in a chapter 2 passage: "I don't trust that doctor", she said of the physician attending the Dionne quintuplets. "He likes the limelight too much."

== Bibliography ==
- Soucy, Jean Yves; Dionne, Annette; Dionne, Cécile; Dionne, Yvonne (1997). Family Secrets: The Dionne Quintuplets' Autobiography. Berkley Books. ISBN 978-0-4251-5690-2. Translated by Kathe Roth. OCLC 824190704
- Soucy, Jean-Yves; Annette, Cécile et Yvonne Dionne (1996). Les secrets de famille des soeurs Dionne (in French) (First ed.). Paris: Presses de la Cité. ISBN 978-2-2580-4416-6. OCLC 409475805..
- James Brough; Marie Dionne; Annette Dionne; Cecile Dionne; Yvonne Dionne. "We were five": the Dionne quintuplets' story from birth through girlhood to womanhood. New York: Simon and Schuster. 1965. OCLC 300008108.
