= Andrew Loomis =

American artist

- Born: William Andrew Loomis; June 15, 1892; Syracuse, New York, U.S.
- Died: May 25, 1959 (aged 66)
- Education: Art Students League of New York; Art Institute of Chicago
- Known for: Painting, illustrator, author
- Notable work: Figure Drawing for All It's Worth; Fun With a Pencil

William Andrew Loomis (June 15, 1892 – May 25, 1959) was an American illustrator, writer, and art instructor. His commercial work was featured prominently in advertising and magazines. However, Loomis is best known as the writer of a series of instructional art books printed throughout the 20th century, and also as the inventor of the "Loomis method". Long after his death, Loomis's realistic style has continued to influence popular artists.

== Early life ==
Loomis was born on June 15, 1892, in Syracuse, New York. Loomis grew up in Zanesville, Ohio, and spent much of his working life in Chicago, Illinois. He studied at the Art Students League of New York under George Bridgman and Frank DuMond when he was 19. Loomis then went back to Chicago to work at an art studio and study at the Art Institute of Chicago.

== Career ==
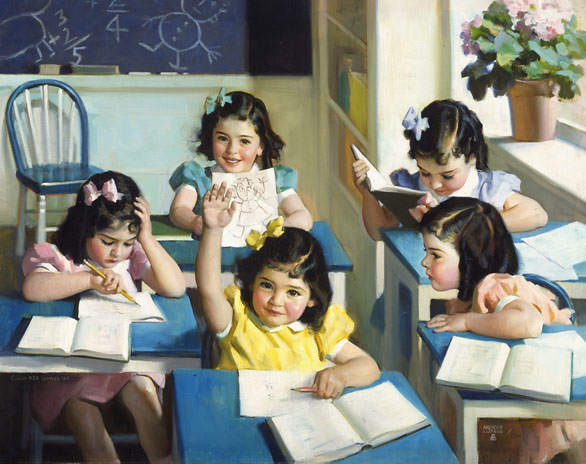
1938 painting by Andrew Loomis, representing the Dionne quintuplets.

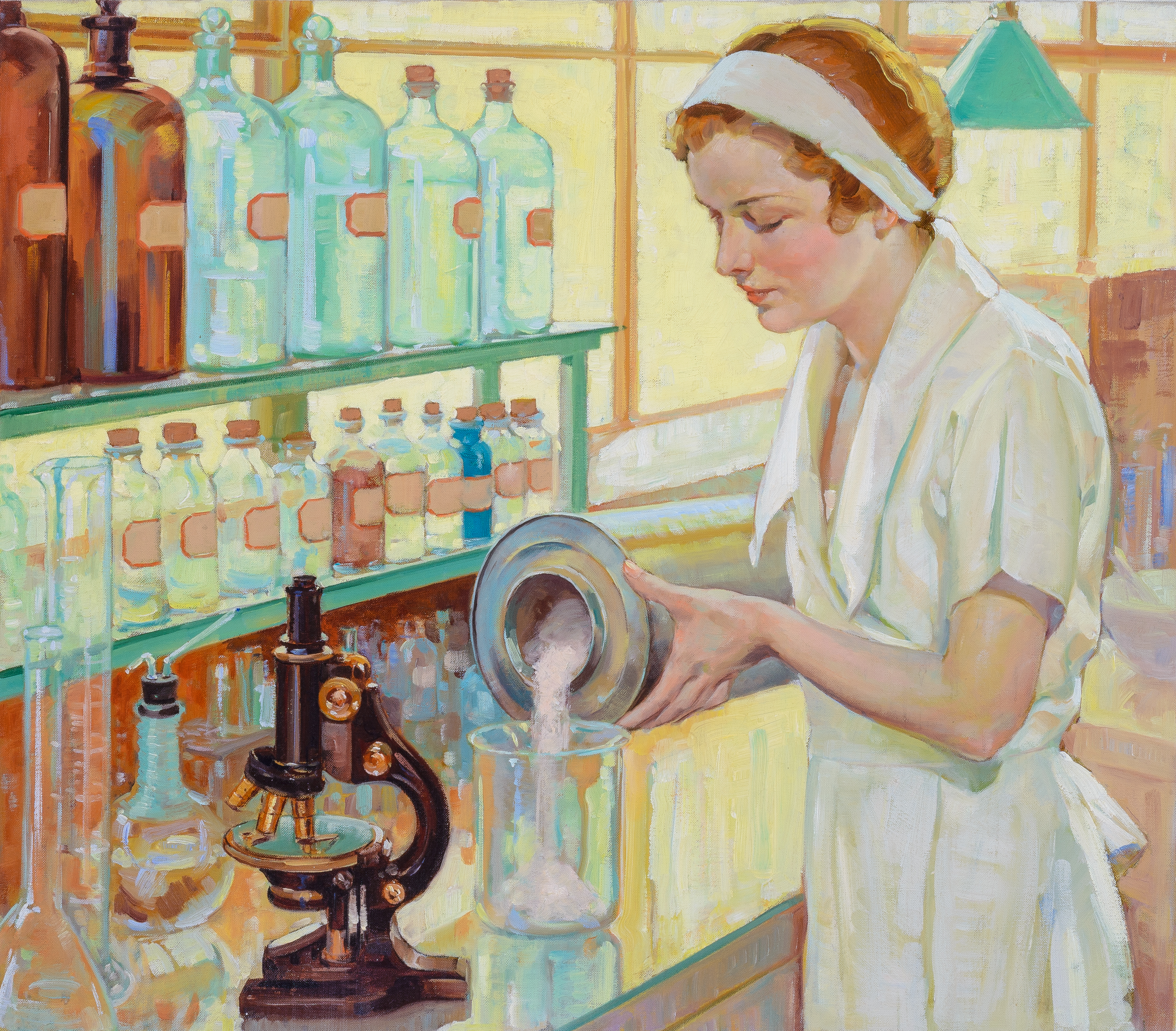
1930s painting by Andrew Loomis, representing Frances Herdlinger at the Mars Factory

After military service in World War I, Loomis worked for a couple of advertising agencies before opening his own studio in downtown Chicago in 1922. From that time until the late 1930s Loomis produced advertising paintings for many large companies such as Coca-Cola, Studebaker, Palmolive, Quaker Oats, Munsingwear, and Kellogg's. He was the official portrait painter of the Dionne quintuplets, and he created Jack and Bingo for the cover of the Cracker Jack box. In 1932, Loomis created paintings for the advertisements that would introduce 3 Musketeers. One of those paintings was a portrait of a Mars chemist, Frances Herdlinger. Herdlinger was one of three women chemists working regularly with Forrest Mars Sr. on the development of the new candy bar.

In the 1930s, he taught at the American Academy of Art. It was during this time that his teaching techniques were compiled for his first book, Fun With a Pencil (1939).

Loomis would go on to release several more books in the coming decades, including one of his most popular, Figure Drawing for All It's Worth (1943). Many of the books exhibit his own personally crafted techniques – such as the "ball and plane" method of head drawing – guided by Loomis's humorous dialogue. Many of the titles gained strong appeal for their academic value and went through several printings during the 20th century. Loomis died in 1959, but his final book, The Eye of the Painter and the Elements of Beauty (1961), was printed posthumously.

== The Loomis method ==
The Loomis Method is a drawing technique that uses grids to represent the human head from various angles accurately. This technique was developed by Loomis in the 1940s, and was first described in his book Drawing the Head and Hands. The Loomis method for the construction of the head is very popular because it is easy to learn and remember and can be applied to any drawing of the head.

== Influence and legacy ==
Titan Books reissued the Andrew Loomis titles in facsimile editions between 2011 and 2013. Prior to that, the books had been out of print for decades, available only as excerpts by Walter Foster Publishing. Some of Loomis's books are currently being published in Japanese via Maar Sha Co., Ltd. Early prints have become highly collectible, sought by art enthusiasts and practitioners.

From Drawing the Head and Hands

From Drawing the Head and Hands

From Figure Drawing for All It's Worth

From Creative Illustration

From Successful Drawing

== Bibliography ==
- Fun With a Pencil (1939). Reissued as a full facsimile of the original on April 5, 2013, from Titan Books.
- Figure Drawing for All It's Worth (1943). Reissued as a full facsimile of the original on May 27, 2011, from Titan Books.
- Creative Illustration (1947). Reissued as a full facsimile of the original on October 12, 2012, from Titan Books.
- Successful Drawing (1951). Republished in a revised edition as Three Dimensional Drawing (16 new pages with technical material on perspective replacing the pictorial gallery sections) and reissued as a full facsimile of the original on May 4, 2012, from Titan Books.
- Drawing the Head and Hands (1956). Reissued as a full facsimile of the original on October 21, 2011, from Titan Books.
- The Eye of the Painter and the Elements of Beauty (1961).
- I'd Love to Draw! (2014). Published posthumously by Titan Books, with some of the text written by Alex Ross.
