= Allan Roy Dafoe =

Canadian obstetrician (1883–1943)

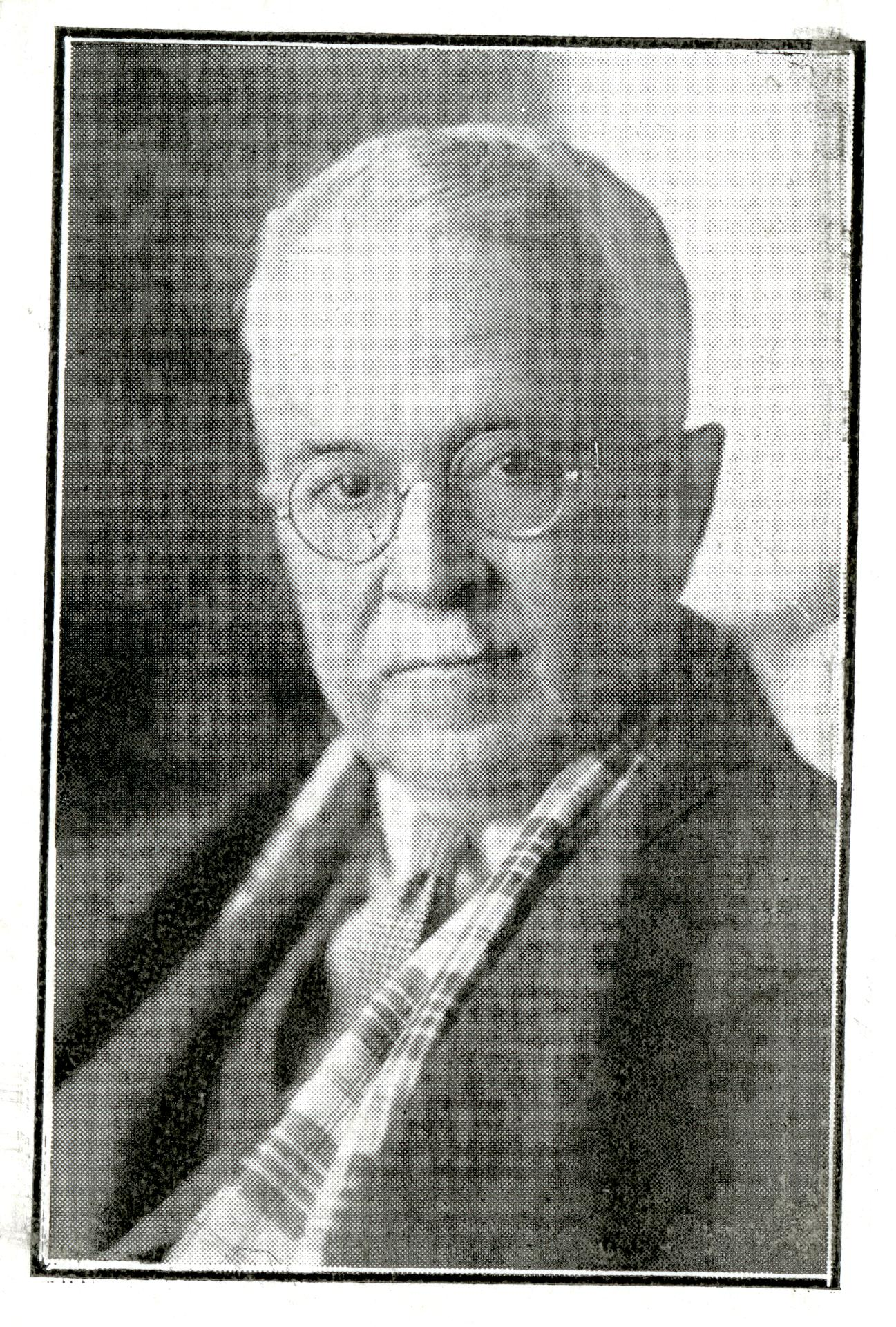
Dafoe

Allan Roy Dafoe, OBE (29 May 1883 – 2 June 1943) was a Canadian obstetrician, best known for delivering and caring for the Dionne quintuplets, the first quintuplets known to survive early infancy.

== Biography ==
Dafoe was born in Madoc, Ontario, the son of a physician Dr William Allan Dafoe. He trained in the same profession and, in early 1909, he went into practice in Callander, Ontario, where he resided for the rest of his life.

On 28 May 1934 he assisted in the multiple births of the Dionne family, that saw the survival of the mother and all the children. This got international press notice. He continued to help care for the children for years, and became something of a celebrity in the onslaught of media attention.

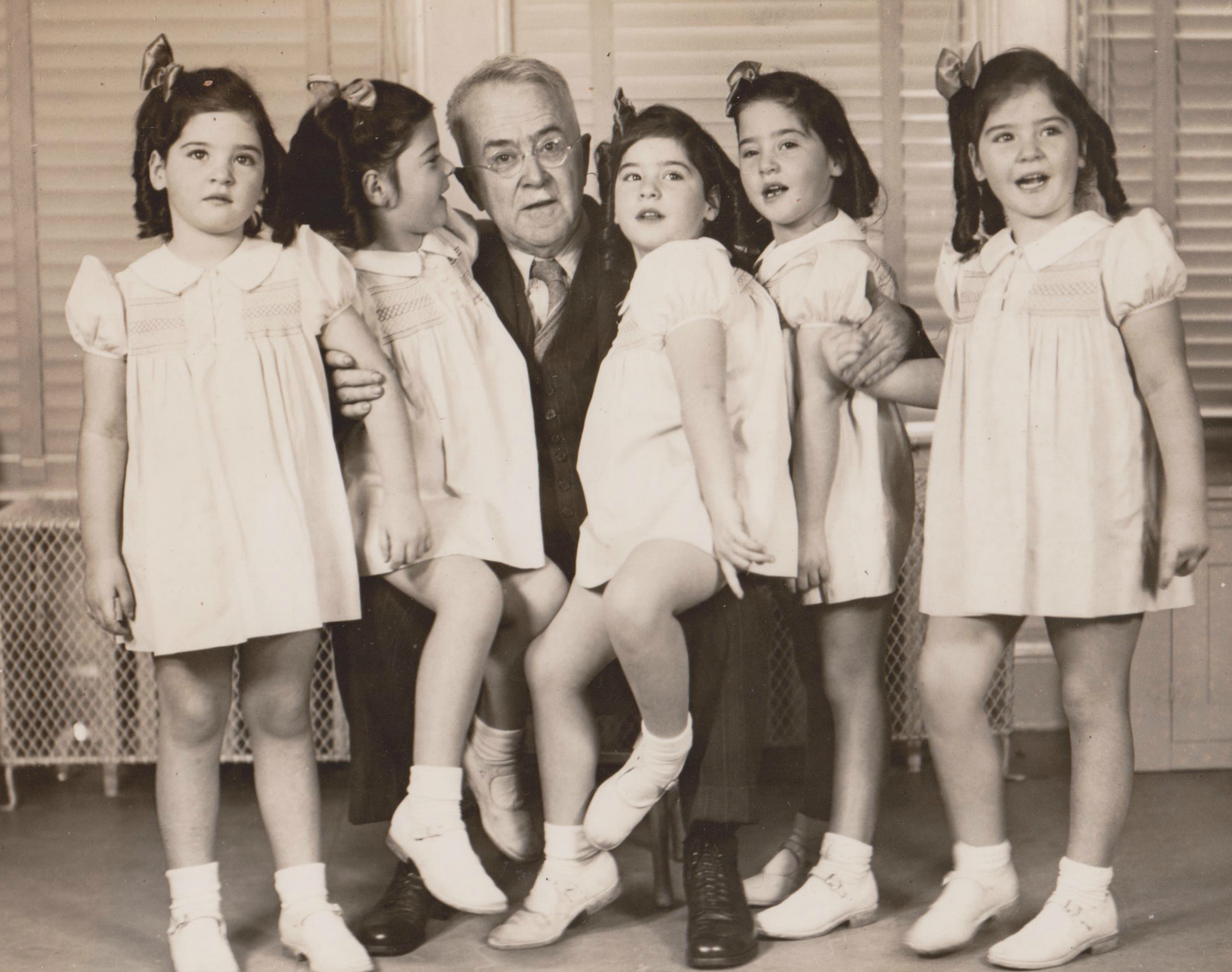
Dr Dafoe with the Quints in 1940

In response to public interest, a special nursery was built for the children where the curious members of the public viewed them. There was no charge to this, so it did not give the impression to the viewers they were exploiting the children. This was generally approved of at the time, but later generated criticism for the sideshow atmosphere it produced. Souvenir stands and other concessions surrounded the area where the quints lived.

Once the quints were born, Dafoe became one of their guardians, and he devoted little work to his medical practice, turning it over to others. He became wealthy from his pay as guardian and from multiple commercial endorsements and speaking fees.

In The Country Doctor (1936), a movie starring the quints, Jean Hersholt portrayed Dr. John Luke, a character based on Dafoe, and there were two sequels: Reunion (1936) and Five of a Kind (1938). When Dafoe blocked the idea of continuing the series, Hersholt created Dr. Christian, which had a long run on radio.

Dafoe's induction into the Circus Saints and Sinners Club of New York as "Doctor of Litters" in 1938 drew much criticism from French-Canadian groups who suggested such an honour (howbeit facetious; he arrived in a Rural Free Delivery wagon emblazoned "A. R. Dafoe--Mass Deliveries") was condescending and against the best interests of the quintuplets; such, in fact, eventually being used by the quints' father, Oliva, in his subsequent case to reclaim custody.

Dafoe was awarded an Order of the British Empire for his work with the Dionne quintuplets. He died on 2 June 1943 at age 60 from pneumonia and complications from cancer, and is buried at Park Lawn Cemetery in Toronto.

Today, his home is the Callander Bay Heritage Museum and Alex Dufresne Gallery in Callander, Ontario. It is located at 107 Lansdowne St. E. and tells the story of the history of Callander with a special focus on himself and the Dionne quintuplets.
