= List of films shot in Lone Pine, California =

The following is a list of films shot in Lone Pine, California and the surrounding area, including the Alabama Hills and Whitney Portal.

Year	Title	Studio	Starring
1948	3 Godfathers	Metro-Goldwyn-Mayer	John Wayne
1946	Abilene Town	United Artists	Randolph Scott
1939	Across the Plains	Monogram	Jack Randall
2000	Adventures in Wild California	IMAX	Documentary
1954	The Adventures of Hajji Baba	20th Century Fox	John Derek
1938	The Adventures of Marco Polo	United Artists	Gary Cooper
1951	Along the Great Divide	Warner Brothers	Kirk Douglas
1978	And I Alone Survived	NBC	Blair Brown
1928	The Arizona Cyclone	Universal Pictures	Fred Humes
1948	The Arizona Ranger	RKO Radio Pictures	Tim Holt
1938	Army Girl	Republic Pictures	Madge Evans
1993	Army of One	Vision International	Dolph Lundgren
1943	Around the World	RKO Radio Pictures	Kay Kyser
1956	Around the World in 80 Days	United Artists	David Niven
1994	Autry	AMC	Documentary
1924	The Back Trail	Universal Pictures	Jack Hoxie
1955	Bad Day at Black Rock	Metro-Goldwyn-Mayer	Spencer Tracy
1925	The Bad Lands	Producers Distributing Corporation	Harry Carey
1930	The Bad Man	First National Pictures	Walter Huston
1949	Bagdad	Universal Pictures	Maureen O'Hara
1967	The Bamboo Saucer	World Entertainment Corporation	Dan Duryea
1943	Bar 20	United Artists	William Boyd (Hopalong Cassidy)
1935	Bar 20 Rides Again	Paramount Pictures	William Boyd (Hopalong Cassidy)
1944	Barbary Coast Gent	Metro-Goldwyn-Mayer	Wallace Beery
1935	Between Men	Supreme Pictures	Johnny Mack Brown
1950	Beyond the Purple Hills	Columbia Pictures	Gene Autry
1932	Beyond the Rockies	RKO-Pathe Distributing Corporation	Tom Keene
1994	The Bicyclist	Past Due Productions	Richmond Harrison
1927	Black Jack	Fox Film Corporation	Buck Jones
1949	Black Midnight	Monogram Pictures Corporation	Roddy McDowall
1956	Blackjack Ketchum, Desperado	Columbia Pictures	Howard Duff
1927	Blazing Days	Universal Pictures	Fred Humes
1950	The Blazing Sun	Columbia Pictures	Gene Autry
1934	Blue Steel	Monogram Pictures Corporation	John Wayne
1937	Boots and Saddles	Republic Pictures	Gene Autry
1927	The Border Cavalier	Universal Pictures	Fred Humes
1950	Border Treasure	RKO Radio Pictures	Tim Holt
1941	Border Vigilantes	Paramount Pictures	William Boyd (Hopalong Cassidy)
1953	Born to the Saddle	Astor Pictures Corporation	Chuck Courtney
1948	Borrowed Trouble	United Artists	William Boyd (Hopalong Cassidy)
2002	Bounty	Third Millennium Entertainment	Short Film (Leo Marks)
1923	Brass Commandments	Fox Film Corporation	William Farnum
1947	Brick Bradford	Columbia Pictures	Kane Richmond
1976	Bridger	American Broadcasting Company	James Wainwright
1940	Brigham Young	20th Century Fox Film Corporation	Tyrone Power
1950	Broken Arrow	20th Century Fox Film Corporation	James Stewart
1949	Bruce Gentry	Columbia Pictures	Tom Neal
1927	The Brute	Warner Brothers Pictures	Monte Blue
1989	Caged Fury	21st Century Film Corporation	Erik Estrada
1920	The Cameraman	Reelcraft Pictures	Billy Franey
1958	Cattle Empire	20th Century-Fox Film Corporation	Joel McCrea
1936	The Cattle Thief	Columbia Pictures	Ken Maynard
1992	Chaplin	TriStar Pictures	Robert Downey Jr.
1936	The Charge of the Light Brigade	Warner Brothers Pictures	Errol Flynn
1926	Chasing Trouble	Universal Pictures	Pete Morrison
1939	The Cisco Kid and the Lady	20th Century-Fox Film Corporation	Cesar Romero (Cisco Kid)
1928	The Clean-Up Man	Universal Pictures	Ted Wells
1928	Clearing the Trail	Universal Pictures	Hoot Gibson
1947	Code of the West	RKO Radio Pictures	James Warren
1943	Colt Comrades	United Artists	William Boyd (Hopalong Cassidy)
1960	Comanche Station	Columbia Pictures	Randolph Scott
1936	Comin' Round the Mountain	Republic Pictures	Gene Autry
2003	Coral Reef Adventure	MacGillivary Freeman Films	Documentary
2004	Counting Sheep	Green TV	Short Film
1935	The Courageous Avenger	Supreme Pictures	Johnny Mack Brown
1950	Cow Town	Columbia Pictures	Gene Autry
1938	The Cowboy and the Lady	United Artists	Gary Cooper
1934	Cowboy Holiday	Beacon Productions Inc.	Guinn 'Big Boy' Williams
1990	Crash and Burn	Paramount Pictures	Paul Ganus
1996	Crossworlds	Trimark Pictures	Rutger Hauer
1920	Cupid the Cowpuncher	Goldwyn Distributing Company	Will Rogers
1935	Danger Trails	Beacon Productions Inc.	Guinn 'Big Boy' Williams
1947	Dangerous Venture	United Artists	William Boyd (Hopalong Cassidy)
1943	Daredevils of the West	Republic Pictures	Allen Lane
1924	Daring Chances	Universal Pictures	Jack Hoxie
1991	Dark Rider	Action International Pictures Home Video	Lance August
1948	The Dead Don't Dream	United Artists	William Boyd (Hopalong Cassidy)
1991	Death Falls	AAA Enterprises Inc.	Rip Torn
1934	A Demon for Trouble	Supreme Pictures	Bob Steele
1926	The Demon	Universal Pictures	Jack Hoxie
1950	The Desert Hawk	Universal Pictures	Yvonne DeCarlo
1953	Desert Legion	Universal Pictures	Alan Ladd
1952	Desert Pursuit	Monogram Pictures Corporation	Wayne Morris
1946	The Devil's Playground	United Artists	William Boyd (Hopalong Cassidy)
1995	Digital Man	Republic Pictures	Ken Olandt
2000	Dinosaur	Buena Vista Pictures	Animated
2012	Django Unchained	A Band Apart	Jamie Foxx
1949	The Doolins of Oklahoma	Columbia Pictures	Randolph Scott
1941	Down Mexico Way	Republic Pictures	Gene Autry
1942	Dudes are Pretty People	United Artists	Jimmy Rogers
1925	Durand of the Bad Lands	Fox Film Corporation	Buck Jones
1950	Dynamite Pass	RKO Radio Pictures	Tim Holt
1923	The Eagle's Feather	Metro Pictures Corporation	Jack Hoxie
2006	Electroma	Daft Arts	Peter Hurteau
1926	The Enchanted Hill	Paramount Pictures	Jack Holt
1936	Everyman's Law	Supreme Pictures	Johnny Mack Brown
1966	An Eye for an Eye	Embassy Pictures Corporation	Robert Lansing
1931	Fair Warning	Fox Film Corporation	Georga O'Brien
1943	False Colors	United Artists	William Boyd (Hopalong Cassidy)
1948	False Paradise	United Artists	William Boyd (Hopalong Cassidy)
1976	Farewell to Manzanar	National Broadcasting Company	Yuki Shimoda
1933	The Fiddlin' Buckaroo	Universal Pictures	Ken Maynard
1924	Fighting Fury	Universal Pictures	Jack Hoxie
1930	The Fighting Legion	Universal Pictures	Ken Maynard
1937	The Firefly	Metro-Goldwyn-Mayer	Jeanette MacDonald
1951	Flame of Araby	Universal Pictures	Maureen O'Hara
1932	Flaming Guns	Universal Pictures	Tom Mix
1926	The Flying Horseman	Fox Film Corporation	Buck Jones
1921	For Those We Love	Goldwyn Pictures Corporation	Betty Compson
1931	Freighters of Destiny	RKO-Pathe Distributing Corporation	Tom Keene
1958	From Hell to Texas	20th Century-Fox Film Corporation	Don Murray
1934	Frontier Days	Spectrum Films	Bill Cody
1939	Frontier Marshal	20th Century-Fox Film Corporation	Randolph Scott
1997	G.I. Jane	Buena Vista Pictures	Demi Moore
1940	The Gay Caballero	20th Century-Fox Film Corporation	Cesar Romero (Cisco Kid)
1928	The Girl-Shy Cowboy	Fox Film Corporation	Rex Bell
2000	Gladiator	DreamWorks Distribution	Russell Crowe
1925	The Gold Trap	Universal Pictures	Fred Humes
2014	Godzilla	Legendary Pictures	Gareth Edwards
1925	The Golden Princess	Paramount Pictures	Betty Bronson
1953	Goldtown Ghost Riders	Columbia Pictures	Gene Autry
2000	Gone in 60 Seconds	Buena Vista Pictures	Nicolas Cage
2002	Goodbye, Guy Guy	Two Rats Films	Michell Arellano
1923	The Grail	Fox Film Corporation	Dustin Farnum
1982	The Great Chess Movie (Jouer Sa Vie)	National Film Board of Canada	Ferdnando Arrabal
1965	The Great Race	Warner Brothers Pictures	Jack Lemmon
1924	Greed	Metro-Goldwyn Pictures Corporation	Zasu Pitts
1927	Gun Gospel	First National Pictures	Ken Maynard
1949	Gun Smugglers	RKO Radio Pictures	Tim Holt
1950	The Gunfighter	20th Century-Fox Film Corporation	Gregory Peck
1957	Gunfire at Indian Gap	Republic Pictures	Vera Ralston
1939	Gunga Din	RKO Radio Pictures	Cary Grant
1948	Guns of Hate	RKO Radio Pictures	Tim Holt
1937	Gunsmoke Ranch	Republic Pictures	Robert Livingston
1965	The Hallelujah Trail	United Artists	Burt Lancaster
1944	Hands Across the Border	Republic Pictures	Roy Rogers
1952	Hangman's Knot	Columbia Pictures	Randolph Scott
1938	Heart of Arizona	Paramount Pictures	William Boyd (Hopalong Cassidy)
1960	Hell Bent for Leather	Universal Pictures	Audie Murphy
1932	Hell Fire Austin	Tiffany Productions	Ken Maynard
1927	Hey! Hey! Cowboy	Universal Pictures	Hoot Gibson
1940	Hi-Yo Silver	Republic Pictures	Lee Powell
1932	Hidden Valley	Monogram Pictures Corporation	Bob Steele
1941	High Sierra	Warner Brothers Pictures	Humphrey Bogart
2000	Highway 395	Castle Hill Productions	Fred Dryer
1957	The Hired Gun	Metro-Goldwyn-Mayer	Rory Calhoun
1953	The Hitch-Hiker	RKO Radio Pictures	Edmond O'Brien
1937	Hollywood Cowboy	RKO Radio Pictures	George O'Brien
1989	Homer and Eddie	Skouras Pictures	James Belushi
1935	Hop-Along Cassidy	Paramount Pictures	William Boyd (Hopalong Cassidy)
2001	Hopalong Cassidy: Public Hero #1	Starz! Encore Entertainment	Documentary
1937	Hopalong Rides Again	Paramount Pictures	William Boyd (Hopalong Cassidy)
1927	The Horse Trader	Universal Pictures	Fred Gilman
1928	Hot News	Paramount Pictures	Bebe Daniels
1962	How the West Was Won	Metro-Goldwyn-Mayer	Gregory Peck
1937	I Cover the War	Universal Pictures	John Wayne
1955	I Died a Thousand Times	Warner Brothers Pictures	Jack Palance
1941	In Old Colorado	Paramount Pictures	William Boyd (Hopalong Cassidy)
1939	In Old Monterey	Republic Pictures	Gene Autry
1948	Indian Agent	RKO Radio Pictures	Tim Holt
2008	Iron Man	Marvel Studios	Robert Downey Jr.
1947	Jack Armstrong	Columbia Pictures	John Hart
1972	Joe Kidd	Universal Pictures	Clint Eastwood
1973	Jonathan Livingston Seagull	Paramount Pictures	Phillip Ahn (voice-Chang)
1945	Jungle Raiders	Columbia Pictures	Kane Richmond
1922	Just Tony	Fox Film Corporation	Tom Mix
1993	Kalifornia	Gramercy Pictures	Brad Pitt
1950	Kim	Metro-Goldwyn-Mayer	Errol Flynn
1953	King of the Khyber Rifles	20th Century-Fox Film Corporation	Tyrone Power
1936	King of the Pecos	Republic Pictures	John Wayne
1940	Knights of the Range	Paramount Pictures	Russell Hayden
1941	The Last of the Duanes	20th Century-Fox Film Corporation	George Montgomery
2002	The Last Place on Earth	MTI Home Video	Tisha Campbell
1953	The Last Posse	Columbia Pictures	Broderick Crawford
1958	The Law and Jake Wade	Metro-Goldwyn-Mayer	Robert Taylor
1939	Law of the Pampas	Paramount Pictures	William Boyd (Hopalong Cassidy)
1935	Lawless Range	Republic Pictures	John Wayne
1935	Lawless Riders	Columbia Pictures	Ken Maynard
1943	The Leather Burners	United Artists	William Boyd (Hopalong Cassidy)
1991	The Letters from Moab	Chanticleer Films	Jarrett Lennon
1933	Life in the Raw	Fox Film Corporation	George O'Brien
1940	The Light of Western Stars	Paramount Pictures	Victor Jory
1919	Lightning Bryce	National Film Corporation of America	Jack Hoxie
2003	Little Eden	Lightmaster Production	D. A. Metrov
1935	The Lives of a Bengal Lancer	Paramount Pictures	Gary Cooper
1939	The Llano Kid	Paramount Pictures	Tito Guizar
1948	Loaded Pistols	Columbia Pictures	Gene Autry
1938	The Lone Ranger	Republic Pictures	Lee Powell
1942	Lone Star Ranger	20th Century-Fox Film Corporation	John Kimbrough
2013	The Lone Ranger	Walt Disney Pictures	Johnny Depp
1957	The Lonely Man	Paramount Pictures	Jack Palance
1954	The Long, Long Trailer	Metro-Goldwyn-Mayer	Lucille Ball
1937	Lost Horizon	Columbia Pictures	Ronald Colman
1948	The Loves of Carmen	Columbia Pictures	Rita Hayworth
1936	Lucky Terror	Diversion Pictures	Hoot Gibson
1943	The Man from Music Mountain	Republic Pictures	Roy Rogers
1934	The Man from Utah	Monogram Pictures Corporation	John Wayne
1924	The Man from Wyoming	Universal Pictures	Jack Hoxie
1951	Man in the Saddle	Columbia Pictures	Randolph Scott
1923	The Man Who Won	Fox Film Corporation	Dustin Farnum
1938	Man's Country	Monogram Pictures Corporation	Jack Randall
1961	Master of the World	American International Pictures	Vincent Price
1994	Maverick	Warner Brothers Pictures	Mel Gibson
1940	Melody Ranch	Republic Pictures	Gene Autry
1923	Men in the Raw	Universal Pictures	Jack Hoxie
1941	Men of the Timberland	Universal Pictures	Richard Arlen
1937	The Mighty Treve	Universal Pictures	Noah Berry Jr
1924	The Mine with the Iron Door	Principal Distributing Corporation	Pat O'Malley
1959	Money, Women and Guns	Universal Pictures	Jock Mahoney
1957	The Monolith Monsters	Universal Pictures	Lola Albright
1935	Moonlight on the Prairie	Warner Brothers Pictures	Dick Foran
1974	Mrs. Sundance	American Broadcasting Company	Elizabeth Montgomery
1950	Mule Train	Columbia Pictures	Gene Autry
1949	The Mysterious Desperado	RKO Radio Pictures	Tim Holt
1944	Mystery Man	United Artists	William Boyd (Hopalong Cassidy)
1944	Nevada	RKO Radio Pictures	Robert Mitchum
1966	Nevada Smith	Paramount Pictures	Steve McQueen
1950	The Nevadan	Columbia Pictures	Randolph Scott
1994	The New Age	Warner Brothers Pictures	Pete Weller
1935	The New Frontier	Republic Pictures	John Wayne
1960	North to Alaska	20th Century-Fox Film Corporation	Dick Foran
1936	Oh, Susanna!	Republic Pictures	Gene Autry
1935	Oil for the Lamps of China	Warner Brothers Pictures	Pat O'Brien
1938	The Old Barn Dance	Republic Pictures	Gene Autry
1930	One Mad Kiss	Fox Film Corporation	Jose Mojica
1936	The Oregon Trail	Republic Pictures	John Wayne
1941	Outlaws of the Desert	Paramount Pictures	William Boyd (Hopalong Cassidy)
1937	Outlaws of the Orient	Columbia Pictures	Jack Holt
1943	The Ox-Bow Incident	20th Century-Fox Film Corporation	Henry Fonda
1953	Pack Train	Columbia Pictures	Gene Autry
1948	Panhandle	Allied Artists Pictures Corporation	Rod Cameron
1930	Pardon My Gun	Pathe Exchange	Tom Keene
1985	Perfect	Columbia Pictures	John Travolta
1942	Perils of Nyoka	Republic Pictures	Kay Aldridge
1998	Phantasm IV: Oblivion	Warner Brothers Pictures	A. Michael Baldwin
1936	The Phantom of the Range	Victory Pictures Corporation	Tom Tyler
1941	Pirates on Horseback	Paramount Pictures	William Boyd (Hopalong Cassidy)
1946	Plainsman and the Lady	Republic Pictures	Bill Elliott
1929	Points West	Universal Pictures	Hoot Gibson
1920	Pollyanna	United Artists	Mary Pickford
1961	Posse from Hell	Universal Pictures	Audie Murphy
1997	The Postman	Warner Brothers Pictures	Kevin Costner
1938	Pride of the West	Paramount Pictures	William Boyd (Hopalong Cassidy)
1955	Prince of Players	20th Century-Fox Film Corporation	Richard Burton
1927	The Rambling Ranger	Universal Pictures	Jack Hoxie
1939	Range War	Paramount Pictures	William Boyd (Hopalong Cassidy)
1927	Ranger of the North	Film Booking Offices of America	Ranger the Dog
2001	Rat Race	Paramount Pictures	Cuba Gooding Jr.
1951	Rawhide	20th Century-Fox Film Corporation	Tyrone Power
1955	The Rawhide Years	Universal Pictures	Tony Curtis
1925	Red Blood and Blue	Aywon Film	Guinn 'Big Boy' Williams
1925	The Red Rider	Universal Pictures	Jack Hoxie
1932	The Red Shadow	Universal Pictures	Walter Miller
1939	Renegade Trail	Paramount Pictures	William Boyd (Hopalong Cassidy)
1994	Replikator	Aurora Motion Pictures Corporation	Michael St Gerard
1991	Republic Pictures Story	American Movie Classics	Documentary
2004	Resurrection	Resurrection Short LLC	Short Film
1955	The Return of Jack Slade	Allied Artists Pictures Corporation	John Ericson
1936	Rhythm on the Range	Paramount Pictures	Bing Crosby
1959	Ride Lonesome	Columbia Pictures	Randolph Scott
1950	Rider from Tucson	RKO Radio Pictures	Tim Holt
1927	Rider of the Law	Bud Barsky Corporation	Al Hoxie
1925	The Rider of the Pass	Universal Pictures	Fred Humes
1937	Riders of the Dawn	Monogram Pictures Corporation	Jack Randall
1943	Riders of the Deadline	United Artists	William Boyd (Hopalong Cassidy)
1939	Riders of the Frontier	Monogram Pictures Corporation	Tex Ritter
1925	Riders of the Purple Sage	Fox Film Corporation	Tom Mix
1941	Riders of the Purple Sage	20th Century-Fox Film Corporation	George Montgomery
1925	Riders of the Sand Storm	Aywon Film	Guinn 'Big Boy' Williams
1924	The Ridin' Kid from Powder River	Universal Pictures	Hoot Gibson
1926	Riding Romance	Anchor Film Distributors Inc.	Al Hoxie
1936	Rip Roarin' Buckaroo	Victory Pictures Corporation	Tom Tyler
1935	The Roaring West	Universal Pictures	Buck Jones
1937	Rootin' Tootin' Rhythm	Republic Pictures	Gene Autry
1927	Rough and Ready	Universal Pictures	Jack Hoxie
1920	The Round-Up	Famous Players–Lasky Corporation	Roscoe "Fatty" Arbuckle
1941	The Roundup	Paramount Pictures	Richard Dix
2000	Running on the Sun: The Badwater (135)	Galaxy Entertainment	Short Film
1942	Saboteur	Universal Pictures	Robert Cummings
1939	Saga of Death Valley	Republic Pictures	Roy Rogers
1945	Salome, Where She Danced	Universal Pictures	Yvonne DeCarlo
1926	Salt Lake Trail	Aywon Film	Art Mix
1949	Samson and Delilah	Paramount Pictures	Hedy Lamarr
1949	Sand	20th Century-Fox Film Corporation	Mark Stevens
1998	Sand Trap	Looking Glass Films	David Markey
1937	Sandflow	Universal Pictures	Buck Jones
1985	Savage Dawn	Bingo Video Inc	George Kennedy
1937	Secret Valley	20th Century-Fox Film Corporation	Richard Arlan
1941	Secrets of the Wasteland	Paramount Pictures	William Boyd (Hopalong Cassidy)
1926	Senor Daredevil	First National Pictures	Ken Maynard
1956	Seven Men from Now	Warner Brothers Pictures	Randolph Scott
1994	The Shadow	Universal Pictures	Alec Baldwin
1927	Shootin' Irons	Paramount Famous Lasky Corporation	Jack Luden
1963	Showdown	Universal Pictures	Audie Murphy
1948	Silent Conflict	United Artists	William Boyd (Hopalong Cassidy)
1927	The Silent Rider	Universal Pictures	Hoot Gibson
1948	Sinister Journey	United Artists	William Boyd (Hopalong Cassidy)
1926	A Six Shootin' Romance	Universal Pictures	Jack Hoxie
2000	Slow Burn	Artisan Entertainment	Minnie Driver
1935	Smokey Smith	Supreme Pictures	Bob Steele
1927	Somewhere in Sonora	First National Pictures	Ken Maynard
1933	Somewhere in Sonora	Vitagraph	John Wayne
1943	Song of Texas	Republic Pictures	Roy Rogers
1930	Song of the West	Warner Brothers Pictures	John Boles
1927	Splitting the Breeze	Film Booking Offices of America	Tom Tyler
1925	Sporting West	Aywon Film	Guinn 'Big Boy' Williams
1952	Springfield Rifle	Warner Brothers Pictures	Gary Cooper
1930	Spurs	Universal Pictures	Hoot Gibson
1927	The Square Shooter	Universal Pictures	Fred Gilman
1950	Stage to Tucson	Columbia Pictures	Rod Cameron
1949	Stagecoach Kid	RKO Radio Pictures	Tim Holt
2004	Stand Up for Justice	Visual Communications	Alexis Cruz
1937	A Star Is Born	United Artists	Janet Gaynor
1994	Star Trek Generations	Paramount Pictures	Patrick Stewart
1989	Star Trek V: The Final Frontier	Paramount Pictures	William Shatner
1921	The Sting of the Lash	Robertson-Cole Distributing Corporation	Pauline Frederick
1926	The Stolen Ranch	Universal Pictures	Fred Humes
1938	Storm Over Bengal	Republic Pictures	Patrick Knowles
1948	Strange Gamble	United Artists	William Boyd (Hopalong Cassidy)
1953	The Stranger Wore a Gun	Columbia Pictures	Randolph Scott
1946	Sunset Pass	RKO Radio Pictures	James Warren
1924	The Sunset Trail	Universal Pictures	William Desmond
1991	Sweet Poison	Smart Money Productions	Steven Bauer
1927	Swiss Movements	Paramount Pictures	Jimmie Adams
1925	Taking Chances	Universal Pictures	Fred Humes
1957	The Tall T	Columbia Pictures	Randolph Scott
1995	Taming Power of the Small	No studio	Cody Dorkin
1943	Tarzan's Desert Mystery	RKO Radio Pictures	Johnny Weissmuller
1952	Tarzan's Savage Fury	RKO Radio Pictures	Lex Barker
1994	Terminal Velocity	Buena Vista Pictures	Charlie Sheen
1933	Terror Trail	Universal Pictures	Tom Mix
1951	Texans Never Cry	Columbia Pictures	Gene Autry
1940	Three Faces West	Republic Pictures	John Wayne
1940	Three Men from Texas	Paramount Pictures	William Boyd (Hopalong Cassidy)
1936	Three on the Trail	Paramount Pictures	William Boyd (Hopalong Cassidy)
1959	Thunder in the Sun	Paramount Pictures	Susan Hayward
1947	Thunder Mountain	RKO Radio Pictures	Tim Holt
1928	Thunder Riders	Universal Pictures	Ted Wells
1933	The Thundering Herd	Paramount Pictures	Randolph Scott
1972	Timegate	No studio	No star
1942	Tombstone: The Town too Tough to Die	Paramount Pictures	Richard Dix
2001	Toyo Miyatake: Infinite Shades of Gray	Japanese American National Museum	Documentary
1940	Trail of the Vigilantes	Universal Pictures	Franchot Tone
1947	Trail to San Antone	Republic Pictures	Gene Autry
1930	Trailing Trouble	Universal Pictures	Hoot Gibson
2009	Transformers: Revenge of the Fallen	Paramount Pictures	Shia LaBeouf
1990	Tremors	Universal Pictures	Kevin Bacon
1997	Trial and Error	New Line Cinema	Michael Richards
1947	Tycoon	RKO Radio Pictures	John Wayne
1950	Under Mexicali Stars	Republic Pictures	Rex Allen
1938	Under Western Stars	Republic Pictures	Roy Rogers
1947	Unexpected Guest	United Artists	William Boyd (Hopalong Cassidy)
1948	Untamed Breed	Columbia Pictures	Sonny Tufts
1945	Utah	Republic Pictures	Roy Rogers
1951	Valley of Fire	Columbia Pictures	Gene Autry
1955	The Violent Men	Columbia Pictures	Glenn Ford
1967	The Violent Ones	Feature Film Corporation of America	Fernando Lamas
1958	The Violent Road	Warner Brothers Pictures	Brian Keith
1923	The Virginian	States Rights Independent Exchanges	Kenneth Harlan
1929	The Wagon Master	Universal Pictures	Ken Maynard
1940	Wagons Westward	Republic Pictures	Chester Morris
1949	The Walking Hills	Columbia Pictures	Randolph Scott
1945	Wanderer of the Wasteland	RKO Radio Pictures	James Warren
1935	Wanderer of the Wasteland	Paramount Pictures	Dean Jagger
1965	War Party	20th Century-Fox Film Corporation	Michael T. Mikler
1920	Water, Water Everywhere	Goldwyn Distributing Company	Will Rogers
1967	Waterhole No. 3	Paramount Pictures	James Coburn
1936	West of Nevada	Colony Pictures Inc.	Rex Bell
1945	West of the Pecos	RKO Radio Pictures	Robert Mitchum
1935	Western Frontier	Columbia Pictures	Ken Maynard
1937	Western Gold	20th Century-Fox Film Corporation	Smith Ballew
1948	Western Heritage	RKO Radio Pictures	Tim Holt
1927	The Western Rover	Universal Pictures	Art Acord
1935	Westward Ho	Republic Pictures	John Wayne
2006	What I Did for Love	Hallmark Entertainment	Jeremy London
1934	Wheels of Destiny	Universal Pictures	Ken Maynard
1938	Where the Buffalo Roam	Monogram Pictures Corporation	Tex Ritter
1925	Whistling Jim	Aywon Film	Guinn 'Big Boy' Williams
1925	The White Outlaw	Universal Pictures	Jack Hoxie
1925	White Thunder	Film Booking Offices of America	Yakima Canutt
1941	Wide Open Town	Paramount Pictures	William Boyd (Hopalong Cassidy)
1947	Wild Horse Mesa	RKO Radio Pictures	Tim Holt
1937	Wild Horse Rodeo	Republic Pictures	Robert Livingston
1926	The Wild Horse Stampede	Universal Pictures	Jack Hoxie
1931	Woman Hungry	Warner Brothers Pictures	Sidney Blackmer
1936	Woman Trap	Paramount Pictures	Gertrude Michael
1948	Yellow Sky	20th Century-Fox Film Corporation	Gregory Peck
1970	Zabriskie Point	Metro-Goldwyn-Mayer	Mark Frechette

== See also ==
- Lone Pine, California
- Lone Pine Film Festival
- Alabama Hills
- Whitney Portal, California
