= Wild Horse Mesa =

Wild Horse Mesa may refer to:

- Wild Horse Mesa (novel), a 1928 novel (originally published in serial form in 1924) by Zane Grey
- Wild Horse Mesa (1925 film), directed by George B. Seitz
- Wild Horse Mesa (1932 film), directed by Henry Hathaway
- Wild Horse Mesa (1947 film), directed by Wallace Grissell
