= Robert Swink =

American film editor (1918–2000)

- Born: June 3, 1918; Rocky Ford, Colorado, United States
- Died: August 15, 2000 (aged 82); Santa Maria, California, United States
- Occupation: Film editor

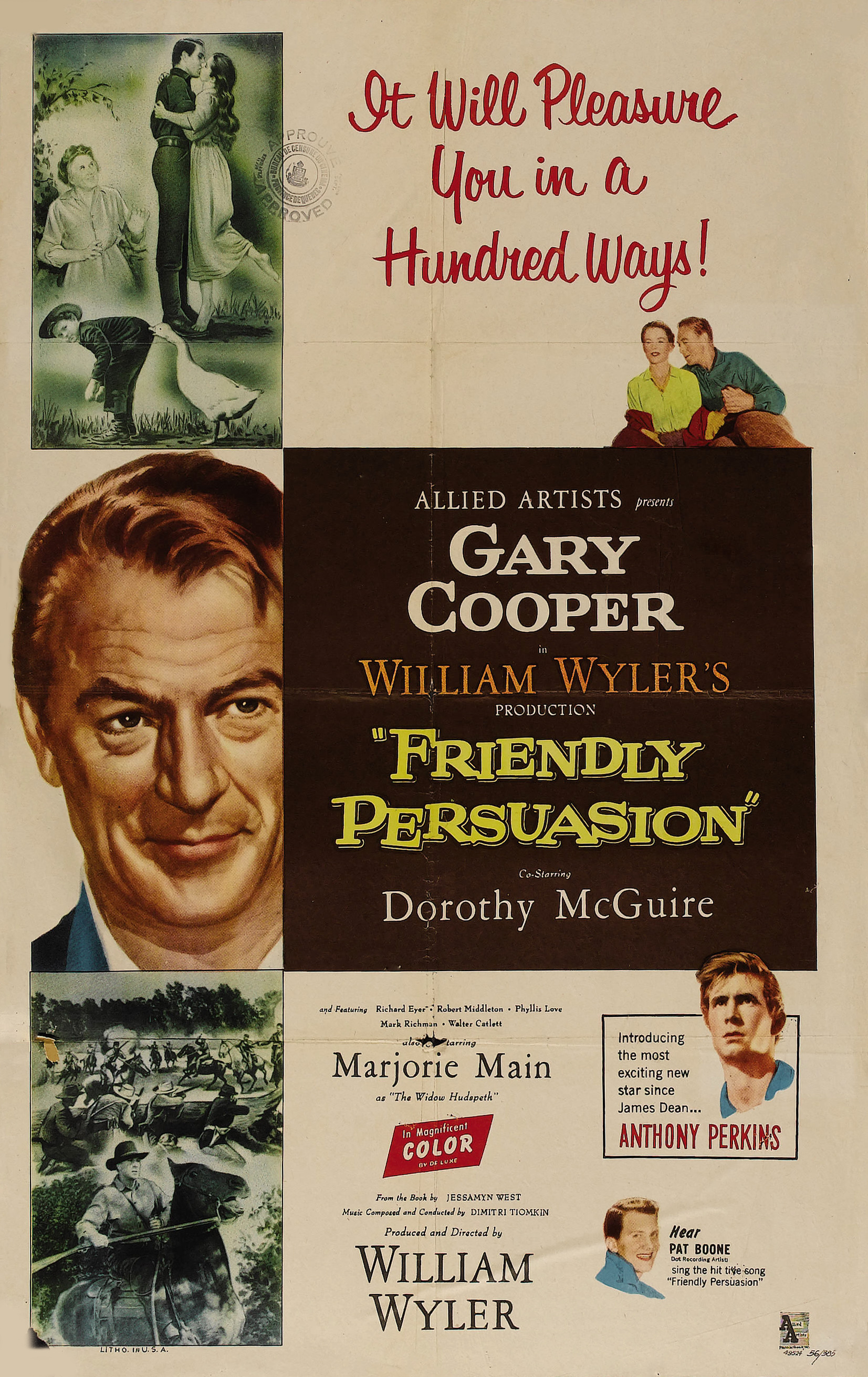
Film poster/lobby card for the 1956 film Friendly Persuasion.

Robert Swink (June 3, 1918 – August 15, 2000) was an American film editor who edited nearly 60 feature films during a career that spanned 46 years.

Born in Rocky Ford, Colorado, Swink and his family moved to Hollywood in 1927. After graduating from North Hollywood High School in 1936, he joined RKO Pictures as an editing apprentice. During World War II, he edited training films for the Army Special Services. His first screen credit was the 1943 comedy short Double Up.

For the next five years, Swink edited mostly B movies until George Stevens hired him for I Remember Mama (1948). He edited several Westerns in 1950, and the following year was hired by William Wyler to work on Detective Story. It was the first of 11 projects on which the two men collaborated. Swink left RKO to join Wyler at Paramount in 1952, and his credits at the studio include Carrie (1952), Roman Holiday (1953), and The Desperate Hours (1955). Among his assistants in this era was Hal Ashby, who became a distinguished editor and director.

In 1964, Swink edited The Best Man for Franklin J. Schaffner. They worked together on four additional films, including Papillon (1973), Islands in the Stream (1977), The Boys from Brazil (1978), and Sphinx (1981). Swink came out of retirement to edit the 1989 film Welcome Home when Schaffner died right after completing principal photography on the project.

Swink worked as a second unit director on The Big Country (1958), The Collector (1965), How to Steal a Million (1966), The Only Game in Town (1970), and The Liberation of L.B. Jones (1970).

Swink was nominated for the Academy Award for Best Film Editing for Roman Holiday (1953), Funny Girl (1968), and The Boys from Brazil (1978). He received the American Cinema Editors Career Achievement Award in 1993.

Swink died of a heart attack in Santa Maria, California.

== Selected filmography ==
Editor
Year	Film	Director	Notes
1944	Passport to Destiny	Ray McCarey	
1944	Action in Arabia	Léonide Moguy	
1944	Heavenly Days	Howard Estabrook	
1946	Step by Step	Phil Rosen	
1946	Criminal Court	Robert Wise	First collaboration with Robert Wise
1947	The Devil Thumbs a Ride	Felix E. Feist	
1947	The Long Night	Anatole Litvak	
1948	I Remember Mama	George Stevens	First collaboration with George Stevens
1949	Riders of the Range	Lesley Selander	First collaboration with Lesley Selander
1949	Adventure in Baltimore	Richard Wallace	
1949	Make Mine Laughs	Richard Fleischer	First collaboration with Richard Fleischer
1950	Dynamite Pass	Lew Landers	
1950	Storm over Wyoming	Lesley Selander	Second collaboration with Lesley Selander
1950	Rider from Tucson	Lesley Selander	Third collaboration with Lesley Selander
1950	Never a Dull Moment	George Marshall	
1950	Double Deal	Abby Berlin	
1951	The Company She Keeps	John Cromwell	
1951	Detective Story	William Wyler	First collaboration with William Wyler
1952	The Captive City	Robert Wise	Second collaboration with Robert Wise
1952	The Narrow Margin	Richard Fleischer	Second collaboration with Richard Fleischer
1952	Carrie	William Wyler	Second collaboration with William Wyler
1953	Roman Holiday	William Wyler	Third collaboration with William Wyler
1954	Witness to Murder	Roy Rowland	
1955	Crashout	Lewis R. Foster	
1955	The Desperate Hours	William Wyler	Fourth collaboration with William Wyler
1956	Friendly Persuasion	William Wyler	Fifth collaboration with William Wyler
1957	The Young Stranger	John Frankenheimer	
1959	The Diary of Anne Frank	George Stevens	Second collaboration with George Stevens
1961	The Young Doctors	Phil Karlson	
1961	The Children's Hour	William Wyler	Seventh collaboration with William Wyler
1963	Captain Sindbad	Byron Haskin	
1964	The Best Man	Franklin J. Schaffner	First collaboration with Franklin J. Schaffner
1965	The Collector	William Wyler	Eighth collaboration with William Wyler
1966	How to Steal a Million	William Wyler	Ninth collaboration with William Wyler
1967	The Flim-Flam Man	Irvin Kershner	
1968	Funny Girl	William Wyler	Tenth collaboration with William Wyler
1972	Skyjacked	John Guillermin	
1973	Lady Ice	Tom Gries	
1973	Papillon	Franklin J. Schaffner	Second collaboration with Franklin J. Schaffner
1974	Three the Hard Way	Gordon Parks Jr.	
1975	Rooster Cogburn	Stuart Millar	
1976	Midway	Jack Smight	
1977	Islands in the Stream	Franklin J. Schaffner	Third collaboration with Franklin J. Schaffner
1978	Gray Lady Down	David Greene	
1978	The Boys from Brazil	Franklin J. Schaffner	Fourth collaboration with Franklin J. Schaffner
1979	The In-Laws	Arthur Hiller	
1979	Going in Style	Martin Brest	
1981	Sphinx	Franklin J. Schaffner	Fifth collaboration with Franklin J. Schaffner
1989	Welcome Home	Franklin J. Schaffner	Sixth collaboration with Franklin J. Schaffner

Editorial department
Year	Film	Director	Role	Notes
1958	The Big Country	William Wyler	Supervising editor	Sixth collaboration with William Wyler
1968	Funny Girl	William Wyler	Supervising film editor	
1970	The Liberation of L.B. Jones	William Wyler	Supervising editor	Eleventh collaboration with William Wyler
1971	Cactus in the Snow	A. Martin Zweiback	Supervising film editor	
1972	The Cowboys	Mark Rydell	Supervising film editor	
1982	And They're Off	Theodore H. Kuhns III	Supervising editor	

Second unit or assistant director
Year	Film	Director	Role	Notes
1958	The Big Country	William Wyler	Director: Second unit	
1965	The Collector	William Wyler	Second unit director	
1966	How to Steal a Million	William Wyler	Second unit director	
1970	The Only Game in Town	George Stevens	Second unit director	Third collaboration with George Stevens
1970	The Liberation of L.B. Jones	William Wyler	Second unit director	

Shorts

Editor
Year	Film	Director
1943	Double Up	Ben Holmes
1943	Hold Your Temper	Lloyd French
1943	Gem-Jams	Lambert Hillyer
1943	Indian Signs	Charles E. Roberts
1943	Radio Runaround	Lambert Hillyer
1943	Hot Foot	Ben Holmes
1943	Seeing Nellie Home	Ben Holmes
1943	Cutie on Duty	Ben Holmes
1943	Unlucky Dog	Ben Holmes
1943	Wedtime Stories	Ben Holmes
1944	Prunes and Politics	Ben Holmes
1944	Say Uncle	Ben Holmes
1944	Poppa Knows Worst	Ben Holmes

TV movies

Second unit or assistant director
Year	Film	Director	Role
1971	In Search of America	Paul Bogart	Second unit director

TV series

Editor
Year	Title	Notes
1952	Your Jeweler's Showcase	5 episodes
1956	Sneak Preview	1 episode
1965	Peyton Place	8 episodes

== See also ==
- List of film director and editor collaborations
