= Gun Smugglers =

1948 film by Frank McDonald

- Directed by: Frank McDonald
- Written by: Norman Houston
- Produced by: Herman Schlom
- Starring: Tim Holt; Richard Martin; Martha Hyer
- Cinematography: J. Roy Hunt
- Edited by: Les Millbrook
- Music by: Paul Sawtell
- Distributed by: RKO Radio Pictures
- Release date: December 28, 1948
- Running time: 61 minutes
- Country: United States
- Language: English

Gun Smugglers is a 1948 American Western directed by Frank McDonald. The film is a Tim Holt B Western wherein Holt serves as a scout for the army in search of some smuggled gattling guns.

Tim Holt plays himself rather than a character.

== Plot ==
A ranger tracks down agents who steal weapons from the army and sell them to a foreign power.

== Cast ==
- Tim Holt as Tim Holt
- Richard Martin as Chito Rafferty
- Martha Hyer as Judy Davis
- Gary Gray as Danny Reeves
- Paul Hurst as Sergeant L. McHugh 'Hasty' Jones
- Douglas Fowley as Steve Reeves
- Robert Warwick as Colonel Davis
- Don Haggerty as Sheriff Schurslock
- Frank Sully as Corporal Clancy
- Robert Bray as Henchman Dodge

== Production ==
The film was originally called Gun Runners. Holt was meant to make Stagecoach Kid first but that was pushed back so he could make this.
