= Road Agent (1952 film) =

1952 American film by Lesley Selander

- Directed by: Lesley Selander
- Written by: Norman Houston
- Produced by: Herman Schlom
- Starring: Tim Holt; Richard Martin; Noreen Nash
- Cinematography: J. Roy Hunt
- Edited by: Paul Weatherwax
- Music by: Paul Sawtell
- Production company: RKO Pictures
- Distributed by: RKO Pictures
- Release date: February 14, 1952
- Running time: 60 minutes
- Country: United States
- Language: English

Road Agent is a 1952 American Western film directed by Lesley Selander and starring Tim Holt, Richard Martin and Noreen Nash. It was produced and distributed by RKO Pictures as part of a long-running series featuring Holt and Martin. Principal supporting cast members included Dorothy Patrick and Mauritz Hugo.

== Cast ==
- Tim Holt as Tim Holt
- Richard Martin as Chito Rafferty
- Noreen Nash as Cora Drew
- Mauritz Hugo as Milo Brand
- Dorothy Patrick as Sally Clayton
- Robert J. Wilke as Slab Babcock
- Tom Tyler as Larkin - Henchman
- Edward Hearn as Sheriff Quillin
- William Tannen as Bill Collins - Toll Gate Guard
- Sam Flint as George Drew
- Forbes Murray as Jeff Adams
- Stanley Blystone as Tom Barton
