= Wild Horse Mesa (1947 film) =

1947 film by Wallace Grissell

- Theatrical release poster
- Directed by: Wallace Grissell
- Screenplay by: Norman Houston
- Based on: Wild Horse Mesa by Zane Grey
- Produced by: Herman Schlom
- Starring: Tim Holt; Nan Leslie; Richard Martin
- Cinematography: Frank Redman
- Edited by: Desmond Marquette
- Music by: Paul Sawtell
- Production company: RKO Radio Pictures
- Distributed by: RKO Radio Pictures
- Release date: November 13, 1947 (US)
- Running time: 61 minutes
- Country: United States
- Language: English

Wild Horse Mesa is a 1947 American Western film directed by Wallace Grissell and starring Tim Holt, Nan Leslie, and Richard Martin. It was written by Norman Houston, based on the 1928 novel of the same name by Zane Grey.

It was the eighth and last of a series of Zane Grey novels filmed by RKO. The book had been previously filmed in 1925 (starring Holt's father) and 1932.

== Plot ==
Two cowboys, Dave and Chito, work a ranch for its owner, Pop Melhern, and his beautiful daughter Sue. Together, the four ride across the countryside, searching for wild horses, a valuable commodity in the Old West. However, after one successful roundup, a rival rancher, Jay Olmstead, offers to purchase the herd from Melhern for $32,000 hard cash. After the transaction is completed, Olmstead quietly trails Melhern out of town. He murders him, using the butt of his pistol, and retrieves the cash. Olmstead has problems though. One of his hired hands, Hod Slack, appears out of nowhere and informs his boss he has just witnessed the deed. But Slack promises Olmstead he'll keep his mouth shut if he makes Slack a partner in all of his business dealings. Olmstead reluctantly agrees.

Later, Dave rides to the site of the murder and searches the terrain for anything that might serve as a clue to the perpetrator's identity. He soon finds what he's looking for—a piece broken off a pistol that might have been the murder weapon. Dave's search for that weapon leads him to the town's saloon, where he becomes embroiled in a free-for-all with two of Olmstead's ranch hands. The sheriff interjects himself into the scene when he informs Dave that, legally, he has nothing on Olmstead. An examination of the guns carried by the two Olmstead ranch hands reveal nothing culpable. As for Olmstead, he had been careful to acquire a bill of sale with Melhern's signature before his death. Where justice is concerned, things could not get worse.

But that's just what happens when Hod Slack kills Olmstead and convincingly frames Dave for the murder. Dave is thus arrested and charged. But Chito breaks him out of jail. And the rest of the story illustrates just how Dave works a small miracle and solves the crime in his favor.

== Cast ==
- Tim Holt as Dave Jordan
- Nan Leslie as Sue Melhern
- Richard Martin as Chito Rafferty
- Tom Keene as Hod Slack
- Jason Robards Sr. as Pop Melhern
- Tony Barrett as Jim Horn
- Harry Woods as Jay Olmstead
- William Gould as Marshal Bradford
- Robert Bray as Tex
- Dick Foote as Rusty
- Frank Yaconelli as Clemente

== Production ==
The film was shot at RKO's backlot in Encino and at Lone Pine.

== External list ==
- Wild Horse Mesa at IMDb
- Wild Horse Mesa at the TCM Movie Database (archived)
- Review of film at Variety
