= Border Treasure =

1950 film by George Archainbaud

- Directed by: George Archainbaud
- Written by: Norman Houston
- Produced by: Herman Schlom
- Starring: Tim Holt
- Cinematography: J. Roy Hunt
- Edited by: Desmond Marquette
- Music by: C. Bakaleinikoff
- Distributed by: RKO Radio Pictures
- Release date: 1950
- Running time: 60 minutes
- Country: United States
- Language: English

Border Treasure is a 1950 RKO Pictures American Western film directed by George Archainbaud.

== Plot ==
Tim Holt and his pal Chito Rafferty thwart outlaws' plans to steal a treasure that has been donated to help earthquake victims in Mexico.

== Cast ==
- Tim Holt as Himself
- Richard Martin as Chito Rafferty

== External list ==
- Border Treasure at IMDb
- Border Treasure at the AFI Catalog of Feature Films
