= Western Heritage =

1948 film by Wallace Grissell

- Directed by: Wallace A. Grissell
- Screenplay by: Norman Houston
- Produced by: Herman Schlom
- Starring: Tim Holt; Nan Leslie; Richard Martin
- Cinematography: Alfred Keller
- Edited by: Desmond Marquette
- Music by: Paul Sawtell
- Distributed by: RKO Radio Pictures, Inc.
- Release date: 24 January 1948
- Running time: 61 minutes
- Country: United States
- Language: English
- Budget: $173,000
- Box office: $265,000

Western Heritage is a 1948 American Western film directed by Wallace Grissell. The film is a Tim Holt B Western about land robbers and forgers in the southwest.

Although based on an original screenplay the film features Chito Rafferty from RKO's earlier Zane Grey series.

== Plot ==
"Tucson, Arizona"

Ex-convict Joe Powell shows his girlfriend, Cleo Raymond, a forged Spanish land grant in his wallet. Corrupt promotor Clyde Arnold and his henchmen, Trigg McCord and Pike Haskins, attack Powell. Rancher Ross Daggett and his pal, Chito Rafferty, find Powell mortally wounded, who tells them to give his wallet to Cleo. Arnold and his men attack again, seizing both the wallet and Powell's body. Arnold, now posing as Powell, takes the land grant to Judge Winston and his niece, Beth, to confirm its validity. Judge Winston goes to Santa Fe and returns, telling Arnold the grant is good, triggering Arnold to use the grant to evict landowners. As Trigg and Pike dispose of Powell's body, Ross and Chito intervene killing Pike. They relay their suspicions to Judge Winston who confirms with Cleo that Powell's land grant was forged. Realizing he could be exposed, Arnold leads his gang to intercept the stagecoach carrying Cleo and Judge Winston. Ross intervenes and a gunfight ensues. Chito brings a posse which scatters the gang. Ross subdues Arnold, and retrieves the forged land grant, which reveals Arnold's true identity.

Ross, Beth, Chito and Cleo ride off together with Chito telling Cleo and Beth that he and Ross are rich enough to marry.

== Cast ==
- Tim Holt as Ross Daggert
- Nan Leslie as Beth Winston
- Richard Martin as Chito Rafferty
- Lois Andrews as Cleo Raymond
- Tony Barrett as Henchman Trigg McCord
- Walter Reed as Joe Powell, forger
- Harry Woods as Arnold, fake Joe Powell
- Richard Powers as saloon owner Spade Thorne
- Jason Robards as Judge Henry C. Winston
- Robert Bray as Henchman Pike
- Perc Launders as Sheriff Claibourne

== Reception ==
The film recorded a loss of $5,000.
