= Hot Lead =

1951 film by Stuart Gilmore

- Theatrical release poster
- Directed by: Stuart Gilmore
- Written by: William Lively
- Produced by: Herman Schlom
- Starring: Tim Holt
- Cinematography: Nicholas Musuraca
- Edited by: Robert Golden
- Music by: C. Bakaleinikoff
- Distributed by: RKO Radio Pictures
- Release date: August 1951
- Running time: 60 mins
- Country: United States
- Language: English

Hot Lead is a 1951 Western film directed by Stuart Gilmore and starring Tim Holt and Joan Dixon.

The production uses footage from Holt's earlier film Saddle Legion and is the final film featuring Lightning, Holt's Palomino horse that appeared in 27 films. Lightning was replaced by Sun Dance, another Palomino.

== Cast ==
- Tim Holt as Tim Holt
- Joan Dixon as Gail Martin
- Richard Martin as Chito Rafferty
- Ross Elliott as Dave Collins
- John Dehner as Turk Thorne
- Robert J. Wilke as Stoney

== External list ==
- Hot Lead at IMDb
- Hot Lead at the TCM Movie Database (archived version)
- Hot Lead at the AFI Catalog of Feature Films
