= Overland Telegraph (film) =

1951 film by Lesley Selander

- Theatrical poster
- Directed by: Lesley Selander
- Written by: Adele Buffington
- Screenplay by: Adele Buffington
- Based on: story by Carroll Young
- Produced by: Herman Schlom
- Starring: Tim Holt; Hugh Beaumont; George Nader
- Cinematography: J. Roy Hunt
- Edited by: Samuel E. Beetley
- Music by: Constantin Bakaleinikoff
- Distributed by: RKO Radio Pictures
- Release date: December 15, 1951 (US)
- Running time: 60 mins
- Country: United States
- Language: English

Overland Telegraph is a 1951 American Western film starring Tim Holt.

== Plot ==
Cowboys Tim Holt and Chito Rafferty are looking for work when they help Terry Muldoon, who works for her father's Arizona telegraph operation, down from a telegraph pole. She suggests she try Colonel Marvin at nearby Fort Craig.

Marvin has just been ordered to shut down the fort because the telegraph has rendered it obsolete. This upsets Paul Manning, who has been supplying the fort with equipment and horses, and is about to go broke as a result. This will mean he cannot marry his sweetheart, singer Stella. Paul's best friend, saloon owner Brad Roberts, tells Paul to go ahead with the wedding.

Tim and Chito ride to Terry's camp just as six masked men are destroying the camp and telegraph wires. Tim shoots and wounds one of the men, Steve, before all three flee on horseback.

They follow them to nearby Mesa City, where Steve and his associate, Bellew, have gone to Brad for help. Brad shoots Steve dead and claims he shot himself. Tim and Chito are suspicious of Brad but have no hard evidence against him.

Terry accuses Paul of sabotaging the camp and hires Tim and Chito as guards on a stage coach carrying a $10,000 payroll. Paul pays off Bellew in Brad's office, happy that the sabotage has earned him $50,000 in delays. After Paul leaves, Brad, hires Bellew to steal the Muldoos payroll, knowing that Paul will be suspected.

Bellew and his associate, Joe, hold up the stage, which is transporting Stella and Terry's father, Muldoon. They grab Muldoon's bag and Stella's purse, and shoot Muldoon, just before Tim and Chito arrive to chase them off.

Chito takes Paul to jail to await the sheriff. Muldoon dies of his wounds and Terry organises a lynching party for Paul. Paul tells Terry and Chito he was behind to sabotage but refuses to implicate Brad. Tim convinces Paul to ride to Crockerville, where he and Stella are to be married in a few days. This conversation is overheard by Bellew who tells Brad, who orders that Paul be killed.

As Tim and Paul ride to Crockerville, Bellew and Joe open fire. Paul is wounded but Tim captures Joe. Paul guides Tim to Brad's nearby ranch home to recuperate.

Bellew tells Brad what happened and he orders Bellew to round up some men to find him. At Brad's house, Tim finds Stella's stolen purse, and Paul reveals Brad's part in the sabotage. Paul realises that Brad is trying to frame him because he is in love with Stella.

Chito identifies Joe's horse as one he saw outside the doctor's office. He ties up Joe and tells Tim. Joe is freed by Brad and Bellew who head for Brad's house. Chito sees this and rides to Terry's camp for help.

At Brad's house, Tim and Paul shoot it out with Brad's gang. Bellew sets the house on fire, but Tim and Paul put it out. Chito arrives with Terry as Tim shoots and captures Brad.

Paul and Stella get married.

== Cast ==
- Tim Holt as Tim Holt
- Gail Davis as Terry Muldoon
- Hugh Beaumont as Brad Roberts
- Mari Blanchard as Stella
- George Nader as Paul Manning
- Robert Wilke as Bellew
- Cliff Clark as Terence Muldoon
- Russell Hicks as Colonel Marvin
- Robert Bray as Steve
- Fred Graham as Joe
- Richard Martin as Chito Rafferty
- Stanley Blystone as Sheriff

== Production ==
"It was one of the best scripts for a girl that I'd seen around that particular time," said Gail Davis. "A lot of times in Westerns they gave the girl the part where she sits at the ranch house waiting for the cowboy to come home, or she waves to the cowboy at the end of the picture as he rides off into the sunset."
