= Guns of Hate =

1948 film by Lesley Selander

- Film poster
- Directed by: Lesley Selander
- Written by: Ed Earl Repp
- Screenplay by: Ed Earl Repp; Norman Houston
- Produced by: Herman Schlom
- Starring: Tim Holt
- Cinematography: George E. Diskant
- Edited by: Desmond Marquette
- Music by: Paul Sawtell
- Distributed by: RKO Radio Pictures
- Release date: June 18, 1948 (U.S.)
- Running time: 61 mins
- Country: United States
- Language: English

Guns of Hate is a 1948 Western film directed by Lesley Selander featuring RKO's Western stars Tim Holt, with Nan Leslie and Richard Martin.

== Plot ==
Bob and Chito are two unemployed and down on their luck itinerant wranglers. They help an older man, Ben Jason, replace the broken wheel on his wagon in a desolate part of Arizona. For their generosity, they are given a gold nugget and an offer of "pick and shovel" work at Ben's mine. Visiting Matt Wyatt, an assayer in the nearest town, Bob and Chito learn the nugget is of high purity, and sell it for $50. Wyatt checks it against a sample and recognizes it must be from the fabled Lost Dutchman's Gold Mine. Chito reveals that Ben Jason gave them the nugget. Matt schemes with the town boss, Anse Morgan, to steal the map of the mine from Ben before he stakes his claim. Ben is murdered. His daughter, Judy, accuses Bob and Chito. Bob and Chito break jail and set matters right.

== Cast ==
- Tim Holt as Bob Banning
- Nan Leslie as Judy Jason
- Richard Martin as Chito Rafferty
- Steve Brodie as Anse Morgan
- Myrna Dell as Dixie Merritt
- Tony Barrett as Matt Wyatt
- James Nolan as Sheriff Bradley
- Jason Robards Sr. as Ben Jason
- Robert Bray as Rocky
- Marilyn Mercer as Mabel

== External list ==
- Guns of Hate at IMDb
- Review of film at Variety
- Guns of Hate at the AFI Catalog of Feature Films
