= Thunder Mountain (1947 film) =

1946 film by Lew Landers

- Original film poster
- Directed by: Lew Landers
- Written by: Norman Houston
- Based on: To the Last Man by Zane Grey
- Produced by: Herman Schlom
- Starring: Tim Holt; Martha Hyer
- Cinematography: Jack MacKenzie
- Edited by: Philip Martin
- Music by: Paul Sawtell
- Distributed by: RKO Radio Pictures
- Release date: June 1, 1947
- Running time: 60 minutes
- Country: United States
- Language: English
- Budget: $177,000
- Box office: $351,000

Thunder Mountain is a 1947 American Western film directed by Lew Landers and starring Tim Holt and Martha Hyer. It was the first of Holt's 29 post war Western star vehicles and the first in a series of Zane Grey adaptations he made for RKO. It was also the first film of his written by Norman Houston who would go on to write 19 more for the star.

The film began production as To the Last Man but the studio had trouble clearing the title because of a proposed Liberty Films project called The Last Man, so they used the title of the 1935 Zane Grey novel.

== Plot ==
A cowboy fights against crooks trying to control his land.

== Cast ==
- Tim Holt as Marvin Hayden
- Martha Hyer as Ellie Jorth
- Richard Martin as Chito Rafferty
- Steve Brodie as Chick Jorth
- Virginia Owen as Ginger Kelly
- Jason Robards Sr. as Jim Gardner (as Jason Robards)
- Harry Woods as Trimble Carson
- Tom Keene as Johnny Blue (as Richard Powers)
- Robert Clarke as Lee Jorth
- Harry Harvey as Sheriff Bagley

== Production ==
Filming began in October 1946.

== Reception ==
The film was made for a relatively high budget for a B Western. This was partly responsible for it making a profit of only $17,000.
