= West of the Pecos (1945 film) =

1945 film by Edward Killy

- Theatrical release poster
- Directed by: Edward Killy
- Screenplay by: Norman Houston
- Based on: West of the Pecos by Zane Grey
- Produced by: Sid Rogel; Herman Schlom
- Starring: Robert Mitchum; Barbara Hale
- Cinematography: Harry J. Wild
- Edited by: Roland Gross
- Music by: Paul Sawtell
- Distributed by: RKO Radio Pictures
- Release date: August 11, 1945 (U.S.)
- Running time: 66 minutes
- Country: United States
- Language: English

West of the Pecos is a 1945 American Western film directed by Edward Killy and starring Robert Mitchum and Barbara Hale. It is the second film version of Zane Grey's novel, previously made in 1934 and also titled West of the Pecos starring Richard Dix. It is no relation to the 1922 silent film of the same name.

The previous year, Mitchum had played the lead in another Zane Grey movie with the same screenwriter (Norman Houston) and director titled Nevada, also featuring Richard Martin as comical sidekick Chito Rafferty. Nevada had been Mitchum's first movie as a leading man and the opening titles began with "Introducing Bob Mitchum as Jim Lacy".

== Plot ==
Colonel Lambreth's health is poor, so daughter Rill persuades him to leave his Chicago meat-packing business behind and move to their Texas cattle ranch. Her fiancé, lawyer Clyde Corbin, stays behind.

On the trail, a couple of cowboys, Pecos Smith and his sidekick Chito Rafferty ride up to the stagecoach the Lambreths are riding. Pecos picks up the payment for cattle he sold from Tex Evans, who is riding shotgun. After they ride off, the stagecoach is attacked by bandits, and Tex is shot. The cowboys hear the gunfire and investigate. The mortally wounded Tex tells them that he was shot by Sam Sawtelle.

The stage proceeds to town with Jeff Slinger at the reins. Rill, harassed in town, tucks her hair into her hat and disguises herself as a boy to be left alone.

Brad Sawtelle, Sam's brother, organizes a posse of vigilantes to find Tex's killer. Pecos gets to Sam first and shoots him.

The colonel and Rill get lost en route to their ranch. Pecos and Chito assist them and are offered jobs. Chito tries to woo the Lambreths' maid, Suzanne, but where Rill is concerned, Pecos still does not know she is a woman. Corbin comes to Texas and senses that Rill is now in love with someone else.

Brad and his men believe Pecos to be an accomplice in the stagecoach robbery and murder. Pecos proves that the one responsible was Slinger, who is shot dead by Brad. A marshal places Brad under arrest, and Rill and Pecos finally get to know each other better.

== Cast ==
- Robert Mitchum as Pecos Smith
- Barbara Hale as Rill Lambeth
- Richard Martin as Chito Rafferty
- Thurston Hall as Colonel Lambeth
- Rita Corday as Suzanne
- Russell Hopton as Jeff Slinger
- Bill Williams as Tex Evans
- Bruce Edwards as Clyde Corbin
- Harry Woods as Brad Sawtelle
- Perc Launders as Sam Sawtelle
- Bryant Washburn as Doc Howard
- Philip Morris as U.S. Marshal
- Martin Garralaga as Don Manuel

== Production and release ==
The film was popular and earned $151,000 in profits. It was Mitchum's final job before his service in the Army.

The previous year, Mitchum had played the lead in another Zane Grey movie with the same screenwriter (Norman Houston) and director titled Nevada, also featuring Richard Martin as comical sidekick Chito Rafferty. Nevada had been Mitchum's first movie as a leading man and the opening titles began with "Introducing Bob Mitchum as Jim Lacy". He was billed as Robert Mitchum for West of the Pecos and for the rest of his extremely long career as a leading man. Both Nevada and West of the Pecos did well at the box office. The latter film was popular and earned $151,000 in profits. It was Mitchum's final job before his service in the army.

Among numerous other roles during her career, Barbara Hale would go on to play Della Street, Perry Mason's secretary in the long-running television series Perry Mason (1957-1966) starring Raymond Burr and would later play the role again opposite Burr for thirty later TV movies (1985-1995).
