= Nevada (1944 film) =

1944 film by Edward Killy

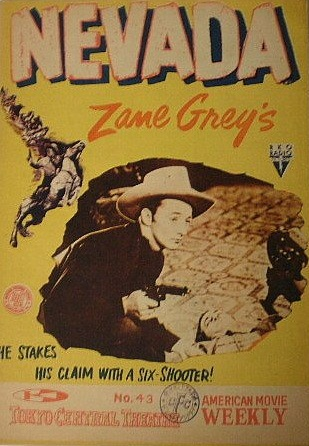
- Theatrical poster without Mitchum's name
- Directed by: Edward Killy
- Written by: Zane Grey (novel); Norman Houston
- Starring: Robert Mitchum; Anne Jeffreys; Guinn "Big Boy" Williams; Richard Martin
- Cinematography: Harry J. Wild
- Edited by: Roland Gross
- Music by: Paul Sawtell; Dave Dreyer (uncredited); Roy Webb (uncredited)
- Distributed by: RKO Radio Pictures
- Release date: December 20, 1944 (U.S.)
- Country: United States
- Language: English

Nevada is a 1944 Western film based on the 1928 Zane Grey novel and starring a 27-year-old Robert Mitchum, with Anne Jeffreys, Guinn "Big Boy" Williams, and Richard Martin in supporting roles. The film was written by Norman Houston from Grey's popular novel and directed by Edward Killy. Mitchum is billed with "Introducing Bob Mitchum as Jim Lacy" at the film's beginning. Although this was not Mitchum's first movie, it was his first lead role; he had previously played mainly villains.

Richard Martin also played sidekick "Chito Rafferty" in thirty other western movies, most of which starred screen cowboy Tim Holt, who had joined the service during World War II when Nevada was produced. Martin played this same character set in different times, both contemporary and the Old West.

This version is a remake of the 1927 silent film Nevada starring Gary Cooper, Thelma Todd, and William Powell. This is the only time that Gary Cooper and Robert Mitchum played the same role in two different films.

The following year, Mitchum again played the lead in another Zane Grey movie with the same writer and director titled West of the Pecos also featuring Richard Martin as Chito Rafferty.

== Plot ==
During the 1850's in the western part of the Utah Territory (now the state of Nevada), speculator Cash Burridge has but one goal. He wants to buy up as much land as he can. He and other investors have noticed "some blue stuff" in the soil. Some folks say this could be evidence of precious metals. Others don't believe it. But Cash does. His belief is so strong he would kill for it. Which he does. When one landowner, Marv Ide, refuses to sell his property, Cash decides to force the issue. He and his partner Joe Powell hide behind some desert rocks and prepare to snipe at both Ide and his daughter Hattie as they drive by in a buggy. It takes just one shot to do away with Marv, but Hattie survives the attack. She has no idea who killed her dad, but she travels on to town anyway to report the murder.

The sheriff organizes a posse. And upon reaching the scene of the crime, they spot Marv's corpse in the middle of the road, being attended to by a stranger calling himself "Nevada" Lacy. The early consensus among the posse is that Nevada killed Ide. And when they discover him in possession of $7,000 cash, they believe this is his motive. Nevada claims he won the money at a gambling house in another town. But no one buys his story. Next thing you know, Nevada is the guest of honor at his own necktie party. But the sheriff puts a stop to that, and Nevada is taken to town and held for trial. Later, though, Nevada's two partners, Dusty and Chito, ride in and bust him out of jail. Nevada then travels to the Ide ranch house to plead his innocence to Hattie. He then asks her who would have benefitted the most from Marv's death.

Eventually the mystery's trail winds its way to Cash Burridge. But while this is happening, assayer Ed Nelson, performs a test on a sample of that "blue stuff" in the area's soil. The test results reveal the town and surrounding countryside is rife with silver deposits. It's a potential motherlode for some speculators—except Cash Burridge. He is exposed by his own partner in a deathbed confession naming him Marv Ide's murderer.

== Cast ==
- Robert Mitchum as Nevada Lacy (billed as "Bob Mitchum")
- Anne Jeffreys as Julie Dexter
- Guinn "Big Boy" Williams as Dusty
- Nancy Gates as Hattie Ide
- Richard Martin as Chito Rafferty
- Craig Reynolds as Cash Burridge
