= The Mysterious Mr. M =

1946 film

- Directed by: Lewis D. Collins; Vernon Keays
- Written by: Paul Huston; Joseph F. Poland
- Starring: Richard Martin; Pamela Blake; Dennis Moore; Edmund MacDonald; Byron Foulger
- Cinematography: Gus Peterson
- Distributed by: Universal Pictures
- Release date: July 23, 1946
- Running time: 13 chapters (227 minutes)
- Country: United States
- Language: English

The Mysterious Mr. M is a 1946 Universal Pictures movie serial, the 137th and last serial produced by Universal.

== Plot ==
Anthony Waldron intends to steal a new submarine invention from Dr. Kittridge while blaming a fictitious mastermind he calls "Mr. M." To further this plan, Waldron uses a mind control drug he has developed called "Hypnotreme." However, a mystery villain soon appears claiming to be the real Mr. M and starts giving Waldron orders.

Federal agent Grant Farrell, whose brother was killed by Waldron, is dispatched to find the mysterious villain and stop his nefarious plans, teaming up with Kirby Walsh and Shirley Clinton to do so.

== Cast ==
- Richard Martin as Detective Lieutenant Kirby Walsh
- Pamela Blake as Shirley Clinton, insurance investigator
- Dennis Moore as Agent Grant Farrell
- Edmund MacDonald as Anthony Waldron, the original villain
- Virginia Brissac as Cornelia Waldron
- Byron Foulger as Wetherby
- Jack Ingram as William Shrag, chief henchman
- Danny Morton as Derek Lamont, one of Waldron's henchmen
- Jane Randolph as Marina Lamont, Waldron's female accomplice
- Joe Haworth as Donning
- William Brooks as Jim Farrell
- Mauritz Hugo as Archer
- Cyril Delevanti as Prof. Parker
- Patricia Alphin as Miss Buckley

== Chapter titles ==
1. When Clocks Chime Death
2. Danger Downward
3. Flood of Flames
4. The Double Trap
5. Highway Execution
6. Heavier than Water
7. Strange Collision
8. When Friend Kills Friend
9. Parachute Peril
10. The Human Time-Bomb
11. The Key to Murder
12. High-Line Smash-Up
13. The Real Mr. M

== Production ==
Filming began May 23, 1946. The completed serial was released exactly two months later, on July 23, 1946.

In 1946 Universal had a change of management, which did away with most of the studio's low-budget productions: musicals, mysteries, westerns, and serials. Universal's last cliffhanger was The Mysterious Mr. M, and the serial unit shut down after three continuous decades of production.

== Reception ==
Film Daily sampled the first two chapters and gave Universal's last serial a rave review: "Socko! The first two chapters give a strong indication that serial carries good punch, suspense, and thrilling anti-climaxes to bring 'em back every week for more. Lewis D. Collins and Vernon Keays give the situations some meritorious direction."

== See also ==
- List of film serials by year
- List of film serials by studio

Preceded by Lost City of the Jungle (1946)	Universal Serial; The Mysterious Mr. M (1946)	Succeeded by none
