= Robert Bray =

American film and television actor (1917–1983)

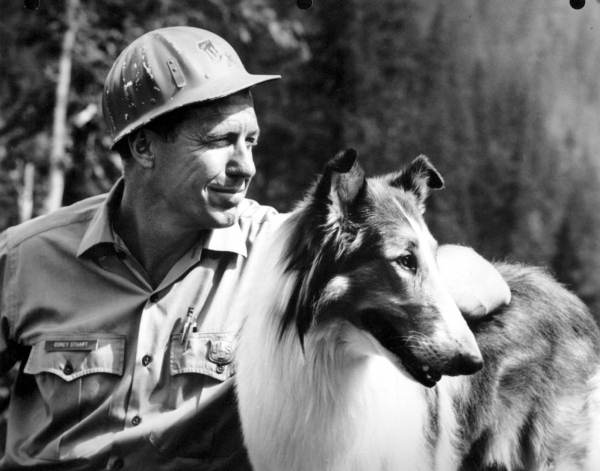
- Bray with Lassie (Pal)
- Born: October 23, 1917; Kalispell, Montana, U.S.
- Died: March 7, 1983 (aged 65); Bishop, California, U.S.
- Occupations: film and television actor
- Years active: 1946–1967
- Spouse: Joan Loretta Bray (m. 1960; div. 1968)

Robert E. Bray (October 23, 1917 – March 7, 1983) was an American film and television actor known for playing the forest ranger Corey Stuart in the CBS series Lassie, He also starred in Stagecoach West and as Mike Hammer in the movie version of Mickey Spillane's novel My Gun Is Quick (1957).

== Early life ==
Bray was born in Kalispell, Montana. His family moved to Seattle when he was ten years old. After graduating from Lincoln High School, he worked as a lumberjack and ranch hand. At the age of 20 his family moved to Hollywood, where he worked as a grip for United Artists.

In 1942 he enlisted in the U.S. Marine Corps where he served as a drill instructor first and then in the South Pacific, rising to the rank of Master Sergeant while serving in combat in the Pacific.

== Career ==
Bray entered films in 1946 under contract to RKO. He appeared in B Westerns like 1949's Rustlers. In the 1950s, the then freelancing actor appeared in a varied number of roles including the 1952 episode "Thunder Over Inyo" of the syndicated western television series The Adventures of Kit Carson.

In 1954, he portrayed bandit Emmett Dalton in an episode of Jim Davis's syndicated western Stories of the Century. That same year, he guest-starred in Reed Hadley's CBS crime drama, Public Defender. On December 4, 1955, he was cast as petroleum pioneer Pattillo Higgins in "Spindletop – The First Great Texas Oil Strike (January 10, 1901)" on the CBS history series, You Are There, the story of the origin of the Texas oil industry.

In 1958, he starred in Never Love a Stranger, a film adaptation of a Harold Robbins novel.

Bray guest-starred in the episode "Obituary" of NBC's western series, Jefferson Drum, starring Jeff Richards, and in the 1959 episode "The Trouble with Tolliver" of the ABC western drama, The Man from Blackhawk.

He appeared twice on ABC's The Life and Legend of Wyatt Earp.

Bray was cast as Carl the Bus Driver in Bus Stop with Marilyn Monroe (1956) and as detective Mike Hammer in My Gun Is Quick (1957). Other roles were on NBC's western anthology series, Frontier and on the syndicated series City Detective and State Trooper.

Early in 1960, Bray was cast as Tom Byson in the episode "Three Graves" of the NBC western series, Riverboat.

In the 1960–1961 television season, Bray played Simon Kane in the ABC series Stagecoach West. The Western comprised 38 one-hour episodes.

He starred in three episodes of NBC's western Laramie between 1960 and 1963. He appeared in three episodes of CBS's Perry Mason. In 1959 he played private detective and murder victim Carl Davis in "The Case of the Foot-Loose Doll." In the 1962 episode, "The Case of the Angry Astronaut," he had the role of title character and defendant Mitch Heller; and in 1963 he portrayed wealthy murder victim Martin Walden (Episode 180, "The Case of the Potted Planter"). He also guest-starred in NBC's Temple Houston, Overland Trail, and The Loretta Young Show. He appeared in four episodes of CBS's anthology suspense series Alfred Hitchcock Presents between 1958 and 1961.

In 1963, he guest starred on Gunsmoke as Gib Dawson, a settler who marries a Comanche woman and has to deal with the racial hatred from others because of it in the episode "Shona" (S8E22). He also appeared as an Army Commander in "The Twilight Zone" S5 E10 "The 7th is Made Up of Phantoms" which aired 12/4/1963.

Bray portrayed forest ranger Corey Stuart starting in Season 11 of Lassie. He was written out of the series in Season 15 as a victim of a forest fire where his character was sent away to a hospital, never to return.

== Selected filmography ==
- Sunset Pass (1946) – Bank Clerk (uncredited)
- Crack Up (1946) – Man with Drunk (uncredited)
- Dick Tracy vs. Cueball (1946) – Steve (uncredited)
- Vacation in Reno (1946) – Police Guard in Bank (uncredited)
- The Falcon's Adventure (1946) – Doorman (uncredited)
- San Quentin (1946) – Saunders, a Gunman (uncredited)
- Banjo (1947) – Policeman (uncredited)
- Honeymoon (1947) – Bridegroom (uncredited)
- Desperate (1947) – Policeman with Lieutenant Ferrari (uncredited)
- Seven Keys to Baldpate (1947) – Policeman (uncredited)
- Crossfire (1947) – Military Policeman (uncredited)
- The Bachelor and the Bobby-Soxer (1947) – Official at Airline Gate (uncredited)
- Dick Tracy Meets Gruesome (1947) – Sergeant (uncredited)
- Wild Horse Mesa (1947) – Tex
- The Judge Steps Out (1947) – Truck Driver (uncredited)
- If You Knew Susie (1948) – Reporter (uncredited)
- Western Heritage (1948) – Henchman Pike
- Mr. Blandings Builds His Dream House (1948) – Workman (uncredited)
- Fighting Father Dunne (1948) – Classroom Instructor (uncredited)
- Arizona Ranger (1948) – Jasper Todd
- Guns of Hate (1948) – Rocky
- Return of the Bad Men (1948) – 'The Youngers': John Younger
- Blood on the Moon (1948) – Bart Daniels
- Indian Agent (1948) – Nichols
- Gun Smugglers (1948) – Henchman Dodge
- Brothers in the Saddle (1949) – Henchman Polk Lynch
- Rustlers (1949) – Henchman Hank
- Stagecoach Kid (1949) – Henchman Clint
- The Clay Pigeon (1949) – Gunsel Blake
- Strange Bargain (1949) – Detective McTay
- Johnny Holiday (1949) – Policeman (uncredited)
- The Great Missouri Raid (1951) – Charlie Pitts
- Law of the Badlands (1951) – Benson
- Warpath (1951) – Major Comstock
- Overland Telegraph (1951) – Steve, Henchman
- Man from the Black Hills (1952) – Ed Roper
- The Gunman (1952) – Tom Jamison
- One Minute to Zero (1952) – (uncredited)
- Fargo (1952) – Ed Murdock
- Feudin' Fools (1952) – Private Eye
- Back at the Front (1952) – Military Police Corporal (uncredited)
- The Lusty Men (1952) – Fritz (uncredited)
- Voodoo Tiger (1952) – Major Bill Green
- The Maverick (1952) – Corporal Johnson
- Seminole (1953) – Captain Sibley (uncredited)
- The Neanderthal Man (1953) – Tim Newcomb, cattle rancher (uncredited)
- The Marshal's Daughter (1953) – Anderson
- Main Street to Broadway (1953) – Lawyer in Fantasy Sequence
- Vigilante Terror (1953) – Gene Smith
- Bad for Each Other (1953) – Trooper at Mine Accident Scene (uncredited)
- Ride Clear of Diablo (1954) – Jackson, Ranch Hand (uncredited)
- Rose Marie (1954) – Mountie (uncredited)
- Arrow in the Dust (1954) – Cavalry Corporal (uncredited)
- The Yellow Tomahawk (1954) – Lieutenant Banion
- Drums Across the River (1954) – Sheriff Ed Crockett (uncredited)
- The Caine Mutiny (1954) – Court-Martial Board Member (uncredited)
- Francis Joins the WACS (1954) – Military Police Sergeant Kreuger (uncredited)
- Shield for Murder (1954) – Detective (uncredited)
- Big House, U.S.A. (1955) – Ranger McCormick
- The Steel Jungle (1956) – Police Lieutenant Soberman
- Bus Stop (1956) – Carl
- The Accursed (1957) – Major Shane
- The Wayward Bus (1957) – Morse
- My Gun is Quick (1957) – Mike Hammer
- Alfred Hitchcock Presents (1958) (Season 4 Episode 8: "Safety for the Witness") - Lieutenant Flannery
- Never Love a Stranger (1958) – 'Silk' Fennelli
- Never So Few (1959) – Colonel Fred Parkson
- Alfred Hitchcock Presents (1960) (Season 5 Episode 19: "Not the Running Type") - Sergeant/Captain Ernest Fisher
- Alfred Hitchcock Presents (1960) (Season 5 Episode 36: "Letter of Credit") - Henry Taylor Lowden
- Alfred Hitchcock Presents (1961) (Season 7 Episode 12: "A Jury of Her Peers") - Sheriff Henry Peters
- Fiend of Dope Island (1961) – David
- The Alfred Hitchcock Hour (1962) (Season 1 Episode 3: "Night of the Owl") - Lieutenant Hank Ames
- A Gathering of Eagles (1963) – Lieutenant Colonel Gales
- Gunsmoke (1963) (Season 8 Episode 22: "Shona") - Gib Dawson
- The Twilight Zone (1963) (Season 5 Episode 10: "The 7th Is Made Up of Phantoms") - Captain Dennet
