= The Adventures of Don Coyote (film) =

1947 film by Reginald LeBorg

- Directed by: Reginald LeBorg
- Screenplay by: Robert Creighton Williams; Harold Tarshis
- Story by: Robert Creighton Williams
- Produced by: Ralph Cohn; Buddy Rogers
- Starring: Richard Martin; Frances Rafferty; Val Carlo; Benny Bartlett; Marc Cramer; Frank Fenton
- Cinematography: Fred Jackman Jr.
- Edited by: Lynn Harrison
- Music by: David Chudnow
- Production company: Comet Productions
- Distributed by: United Artists
- Release date: May 9, 1947
- Running time: 65 minutes
- Country: United States
- Language: English

The Adventures of Don Coyote is a 1947 American Western comedy film in Cinecolor. It is directed by Reginald LeBorg and written by Robert Creighton Williams and Harold Tarshis. The film stars Richard Martin, Frances Rafferty, Val Carlo, Benny Bartlett, Marc Cramer and Frank Fenton. The film was released on May 9, 1947, by United Artists.

== Cast ==
- Richard Martin as Don Coyote
- Frances Rafferty as Maggie Riley
- Val Carlo as Sancho
- Benny Bartlett as Ted Riley
- Marc Cramer as Sheriff Dave Sherman
- Frank Fenton as Big Foot Ferguson
- Byron Foulger as Henry Felton
- Eddie Parker as Henchman Joe
- Pierce Lyden as Henchman Jeff
- Frank McCarroll as Henchman Steve
