= Sinister Journey =

1948 film by George Archainbaud

- Theatrical release poster
- Directed by: George Archainbaud
- Screenplay by: Doris Schroeder
- Produced by: Lewis J. Rachmil
- Starring: William Boyd; Andy Clyde; Rand Brooks; Elaine Riley; John Kellogg; Don Haggerty
- Cinematography: Mack Stengler
- Edited by: Fred W. Berger
- Music by: Darrell Calker
- Production company: Hopalong Cassidy Productions
- Distributed by: United Artists
- Release date: June 11, 1948
- Running time: 59 minutes
- Country: United States
- Language: English

Sinister Journey is a 1948 American Western film directed by George Archainbaud and written by Doris Schroeder. The film stars William Boyd, Andy Clyde, Rand Brooks, Elaine Riley, John Kellogg and Don Haggerty. The film was released on June 11, 1948, by United Artists.

== Plot ==
Lee Garvin has eloped with the daughter of a railroad man who didn't approve of the marriage. Hoppy steps in when the young man is framed for murder.

== Cast ==
- William Boyd as Hopalong Cassidy
- Andy Clyde as California Carlson
- Rand Brooks as Lucky Jenkins
- Elaine Riley as Jessie Garvin
- John Kellogg as Lee Garvin
- Don Haggerty as Harmon Roberts
- Stanley Andrews as Tom Smith
- Harry Strang as Banks
- John Butler as Storekeeper
- Herbert Rawlinson as Marshal Reardon
- Will Orleans as Ex-con Ben Watts
- Wayne C. Treadway as Engineer
