= Four Fast Guns =

1960 film

- Theatrical release poster
- Directed by: William J. Hole, Jr.
- Written by: James Edmiston; Dallas Gaultois
- Produced by: William J. Hole Jr.
- Starring: James Craig; Martha Vickers; Edgar Buchanan; Brett Halsey; Paul Richards; Richard Martin
- Cinematography: John M. Nickolaus Jr.
- Edited by: Reg Browne; Henry F. Salerno; Harold E. Wooley
- Production company: Phoenix Film Studios Productions
- Distributed by: Universal International
- Release date: February 10, 1960
- Running time: 73 minutes
- Country: United States
- Language: English

Four Fast Guns is a 1960 American Western film directed by William J. Hole Jr. and written by James Edmiston and Dallas Gaultois. The film stars James Craig, Martha Vickers, Edgar Buchanan, Brett Halsey, Paul Richards and Richard Martin.

== Plot ==
Wanted outlaw Tom Sabin rides to the town of Purgatory, ruled by a ruthless man named Hoag, who is deemed safe from being killed by virtue of being handicapped and in a wheelchair.

Tom befriends town deputy Dipper and attracts the interest of Hoag's beautiful wife Mary, although he isn't sure whether to trust her. Hoag sends for three hired gunmen to get Tom out of his town, but Tom gets the better of the first two, shooting both.

The third, Johnny Naco, is offered triple pay by Hoag to get the job done. All in town are shocked when Tom refuses to face Johnny. It turns out they are brothers. Tom took the blame for a crime Johnny committed, so a grateful Johnny doesn't want to kill him.

Johnny shoots Hoag, in cold blood. When townspeople ridicule Tom for not facing the outlaw, Johnny calls him out and draws, forcing Tom to shoot him. Tom leaves the sheriff's job to Dipper and rides off, Mary promising to meet him.

== Cast ==
- James Craig as Tom Sabin
- Martha Vickers as Mary Hoag
- Edgar Buchanan as Dipper
- Brett Halsey as Johnny Naco
- Paul Richards as Hoag
- Richard Martin as Quijano
- Blu Wright as Farmer Brown
- John Swift as Zodie Dawes
- Paul Raymond as Bartender
