= Richard Martin (actor) =

American actor (1917–1994)

- Born: December 12, 1917; Spokane, Washington
- Died: September 4, 1994 (aged 76)
- Occupation: Actor
- Years active: 1942 - 1960
- Known for: Chito Rafferty character
- Spouse: Elaine Riley (1946 - 1994)

Richard Martin (December 12, 1917 – September 4, 1994) was an American actor. He was best known for his role as Chito Rafferty, the Irish-Mexican western comedy relief sidekick of Tim Holt and Robert Mitchum, among others. Before their pairing, Martin originated the role in the 1943 film Bombardier.

== Early life ==
Martin was born in Spokane, Washington. His family moved to a Mexican neighborhood in West Hollywood, California, where he learned to imitate his friends. He began in films by working as a receptionist for MGM. When a friend made a bet with his agent that the agent couldn't get Martin an actor's contract, Martin's agent won the bet. He became a prolific contract player for RKO Pictures in 1942, often appearing unbilled. It was there his Chito Rafferty character was born.

== Career ==
Hollywood's World War II films often featured many ethnic American enlisted men, and Martin first played Rafferty as a contemporary air crewman in Bombardier. He soon repeated the role in the western Nevada opposite Robert Mitchum. He appeared opposite a few other stars in RKO westerns.

=== Post-WWII ===
After the war, Martin left RKO and essayed the main role in the last Universal Pictures film serial The Mysterious Mr. M, as well as the title role in the 1947 Cinecolor western The Adventures of Don Coyote. When Tim Holt, back from the war, was hired by producer Herman Schlom to star in a Western series, the two pondered whom they could get for a sidekick, and Schlom recalled Martin's Rafferty character from Nevada. Martin returned to RKO in the same year in his first appearance alongside Holt in Under the Tonto Rim, the first of 29 films they did together that were initially based on stories by Zane Grey.

As B westerns and exclusive studio contracts gradually ended in the 1950s, Martin found himself out of work and unable to find any due to his ethnic characterisation. He became an insurance salesman, coming back for one last western, Four Fast Guns, in 1960.

=== Chito Rafferty ===
Martin originated the Mexican-Irish character of Chito Rafferty, whose full name was "Chito Jose Gonzales Bustamonte Rafferty", in 1943's war film Bombardier.

The character went on to appear in a further 34 films, all of them westerns: 1944's Nevada and 1945's West of the Pecos, both of which starred Robert Mitchum; 1945's Wanderer of the Wasteland, which starred James Warren; 1946's Sunset Pass and 1947's Code of the West, in which the role was not played by Martin but by John Laurenz; then a further 29 films, all of which featured Chito Rafferty as the sidekick to a different hero, always played by Tim Holt: Thunder Mountain, Under the Tonto Rim and Wild Horse Mesa in 1947, Western Heritage, The Arizona Ranger, Guns of Hate, Indian Agent and Gun Smugglers in 1948, Brothers in the Saddle, Riders of the Range, Rustlers, Stagecoach Kid, The Mysterious Desperado and Masked Raiders in 1949, Storm Over Wyoming, Rider from Tucson, Dynamite Pass, Border Treasure, Rio Grande Patrol and Law of the Badlands in 1950, Saddle Legion, Gunplay, Pistol Harvest, Hot Lead and Overland Telegraph in 1951, and Trail Guide, Road Agent, Target and Desert Passage in 1952.

The character, particularly in the films with Tim Holt's character, was presented as a loyal sidekick and ladies' man who was afraid to commit to long term relationships with the women to whom he was attracted. Typical plot lines showed Chito flirting with either the female lead character, or supporting character, at the beginning of the film, only to run away from a romantic commitment at the end.

== Personal life ==
Martin met his wife, former fashion model and actress Elaine Riley, on a film set in Carmel, where a scheduled four-day shoot stretched to three weeks because of fog. He was married to Riley from 1946 until his death. They worked together only once, in Rider from Tucson (1950), but were regarded as one of Hollywood's happiest couples. When Howard Hughes cancelled Martin's contract at RKO in 1953, he left Hollywood to set up an insurance business. The couple had no children.

== Quotes ==
The Irish in me is for fight; the Mexican for love

== Filmography ==
| Year | Title | Role | Notes |
|---|---|---|---|
| 1942 | Call Out the Marines | Marine Corporal in Café | Uncredited |
| 1942 | Mexican Spitfire at Sea | Steward | Uncredited |
| 1942 | My Favorite Spy | Nightclub Patron | Uncredited |
| 1942 | The Mayor of 44th Street | Office Clerk | Uncredited |
| 1942 | Mexican Spitfire Sees a Ghost | Epping's Chauffeur | Uncredited |
| 1942 | Thundering Hoofs | Man at Dance | Uncredited |
| 1942 | The Big Street | Minor Role | Uncredited |
| 1942 | The Falcon's Brother | Steamship Official | Uncredited |
| 1942 | Army Surgeon | Soldier-Patient | Uncredited |
| 1942 | Seven Days' Leave | Soldier | Uncredited |
| 1942 | Seven Miles from Alcatraz | Second Radio Operator | Uncredited |
| 1942 | Red River Robin Hood | Robbed Rancher's Son | Uncredited |
| 1943 | Hitler's Children | Gestapo Man | Uncredited |
| 1943 | Ladies' Day | Sox Player | Uncredited |
| 1943 | Bombardier | Chito Rafferty | |
| 1943 | The Leopard Man | Raoul Belmonte | Uncredited |
| 1943 | The Falcon in Danger | George Morley | |
| 1943 | The Adventures of a Rookie | Bob Prescott | |
| 1943 | The Iron Major | David 'Davie' Cavanaugh | |
| 1943 | Gangway for Tomorrow | Jules | Uncredited |
| 1943 | Tender Comrade | Mike Dumbrowski | |
| 1944 | Marine Raiders | Pfc. Jimmy Fowler | |
| 1944 | Nevada | Chito Rafferty | |
| 1945 | Having Wonderful Crime | Lance Richards | |
| 1945 | Wanderer of the Wasteland | Chito Rafferty | |
| 1945 | West of the Pecos | Chito Rafferty | |
| 1946 | The Bamboo Blonde | Jim Wilson | |
| 1946 | The Mysterious Mr. M | Detective Lieutenant Kirby Walsh | |
| 1947 | The Adventures of Don Coyote | Don Coyote | |
| 1947 | Thunder Mountain | Chito Rafferty | |
| 1947 | Under the Tonto Rim | Chito Rafferty | |
| 1947 | Wild Horse Mesa | Chito Rafferty | |
| 1948 | Western Heritage | Chito Rafferty | |
| 1948 | The Arizona Ranger | Chito Rafferty | |
| 1948 | Guns of Hate | Chito Rafferty | |
| 1948 | Indian Agent | Chito Rafferty | |
| 1948 | Gun Smugglers | Chito Rafferty | |
| 1949 | Brothers in the Saddle | Chito Rafferty | |
| 1949 | Rustlers | Chito Rafferty | |
| 1949 | Stagecoach Kid | Chito Rafferty | |
| 1949 | Masked Raiders | Chito Rafferty | |
| 1949 | The Mysterious Desperado | Chito Rafferty | |
| 1950 | Riders of the Range | Chito Rafferty | |
| 1950 | Dynamite Pass | Chito Rafferty | |
| 1950 | Storm Over Wyoming | Chito Rafferty | |
| 1950 | Rider from Tucson | Chito Rafferty | |
| 1950 | Border Treasure | Chito Rafferty | |
| 1950 | Rio Grande Patrol | Chito Rafferty | |
| 1951 | Law of the Badlands | Chito Rafferty | |
| 1951 | Saddle Legion | Chito Rafferty | |
| 1951 | Gunplay | Chito Rafferty | |
| 1951 | Pistol Harvest | Chito Rafferty | |
| 1951 | Hot Lead | Chito Rafferty | |
| 1951 | Overland Telegraph | Chito Rafferty | |
| 1952 | Trail Guide | Chito Rafferty | |
| 1952 | Road Agent | Chito Rafferty | |
| 1952 | Target | Chito Rafferty | |
| 1952 | Desert Passage | Chito Rafferty | |
| 1952 | The Raiders | Felipe de Ortega | |
| 1957 | Hell Bound | Dock Worker | Uncredited |
| 1960 | Four Fast Guns | Quijano | |
