= Strange Gamble =

1948 film by George Archainbaud

- Theatrical release poster
- Directed by: George Archainbaud
- Screenplay by: Doris Schroeder; Bennett Cohen; Ande Lamb
- Produced by: Lewis J. Rachmil
- Starring: William Boyd; Andy Clyde; Rand Brooks; Elaine Riley; James Craven; Robert Williams
- Cinematography: Mack Stengler
- Edited by: Fred W. Berger
- Music by: Raoul Kraushaar
- Production company: Hopalong Cassidy Productions
- Distributed by: United Artists
- Release date: October 8, 1948
- Running time: 61 minutes
- Country: United States
- Language: English

Strange Gamble is a 1948 American Western film directed by George Archainbaud, written by Doris Schroeder, Bennett Cohen and Ande Lamb, and starring William Boyd, Andy Clyde, Rand Brooks, Elaine Riley, James Craven and Robert Williams. It was released on October 8, 1948, by United Artists.

This film was the 66th and final of the series based on the Clarence E. Mulford character, Hopalong Cassidy.

== Cast ==
- William Boyd as Hopalong Cassidy
- Andy Clyde as California Carlson
- Rand Brooks as Lucky Jenkins
- Elaine Riley as Nora Murray
- James Craven as Mordigan
- Robert Williams as Henchman Pete Walters
- Alberto Morin as Ramón DeLara
- Joel Friedkin as Doc White
- Herbert Rawlinson as John Murray
- Francis McDonald as Henchman Longhorn
- William F. Leicester as Sid Murray
- Joan Barton as Mary Murray
- Lee Tung Foo as Wong
