= Law of the Badlands =

1951 film by Lesley Selander

- Directed by: Lesley Selander
- Starring: Tim Holt; Joan Dixon
- Production company: RKO Pictures
- Release date: December 27, 1950 (U.S.)
- Running time: 59 minutes
- Country: United States
- Language: English
- Budget: $98,000

Law of the Badlands is a 1951 American Western film starring Tim Holt. Although it is the cheapest Holt film since the war years, it still recorded a loss of $20,000.

== Plot ==
In 1890, Captain McVey of the Texas Rangers is dispatched by the United States Secret Service to investigate a counterfeiting ring in the Texas badlands. McVey orders two of his Rangers, Dave and his sidekick Chito Rafferty, to infiltrate the ring posing as criminals. Chito bids farewell to his girlfriend, Velvet. En route, they steal gold from a gang that held up a stagecoach. Arriving in Badland, Texas, Dave and Chito enter Cash Carlton's bar and stop a man named Madigan from robbing Carlton. Durkin and Benson, two of the gang from the stagecoach robbery, enter the bar to wrest the gold from Dave and Chito. Carlton intervenes and offers Dave and Chito an opportunity to work for him in his counterfeiting ring. Carlton's engraver Simms, who also owns a feed store, is suspicious of Dave and Chito. Carlton pays Dave and Chito for their stolen gold in counterfeit money.

Leaving Carlton's ranch house, Dave and Chito see a man lurking in Carlton's barn. The man escapes after knocking Chito to the ground. In town, Dave and Chito recognize the blacksmith as the man in Carlton's barn. When confronted, the blacksmith identifies himself as Burt Conroy, a Secret Service agent working undercover. He apologizes for hitting Chito and briefs them on the gang's counterfeiting activities. Dave and Chito return to Carlton's bar, where they are dispatched by Carlton and the rest of the gang to raid a newspaper office for supplies. Conroy uses a carrier pigeon to reveal the raid to Captain McVey, who intercepts the gang and kills two of its members in a gunfight. The gang suspect Dave and Chito of being informants, but Carlton disagrees and believes that someone else in town is acting undercover. Dave and Chito warn Conroy that Carlton suspects that only a carrier pigeon could deliver a message fast enough to have thwarted the raid. As Conroy rides out of town, Carlton kills him.

Dave and Chito return to Carlton's barn, where they see Simms hauling blank paper. They break into Simms' feed store and discover counterfeit cash stored in grain sacks. However, Simms returns before Dave and Chito can find the printing plates. Chito returns to the bar, where Velvet, who has been hired as a showgirl by Carlton, recognizes Chito and unwittingly reveals his true identity. A gunfight ensues as Dave and Chito escape. Dave and Chito evade the gang and return to Simms' store and lure Carlton and Simms there under the ruse of a fire, and Carlton reveals the location of the printing plates. The gang arrives and Carlton escapes, and a gunfight ensues. Carlton attempts to persuade Velvet to force Dave and Chito to surrender, but Velvet sends a message from Dave to Captain McVey via carrier pigeon. McVey and his rangers arrive to arrest the gang just as Dave and Chito are depleted of ammunition. Velvet, miffed that Chito posed as a criminal, storms away, and Chito says that he is through with women, but then pursues another one walking down the street.

== Cast ==
- Tim Holt as Dave
- Richard Martin as Chito Rafferty
- Joan Dixon as Velvet
- Leonard Penn as Cash Carlton
- Robert Livingston as Durkin
- Robert Bray as Benson
- Larry Johns as Lafe Simms
- Harry Woods as Burt Conroy
- John Cliff as Madigan
- Kenneth MacDonald as Captain McVey
