= Nan Leslie =

American actress (1926–2000)

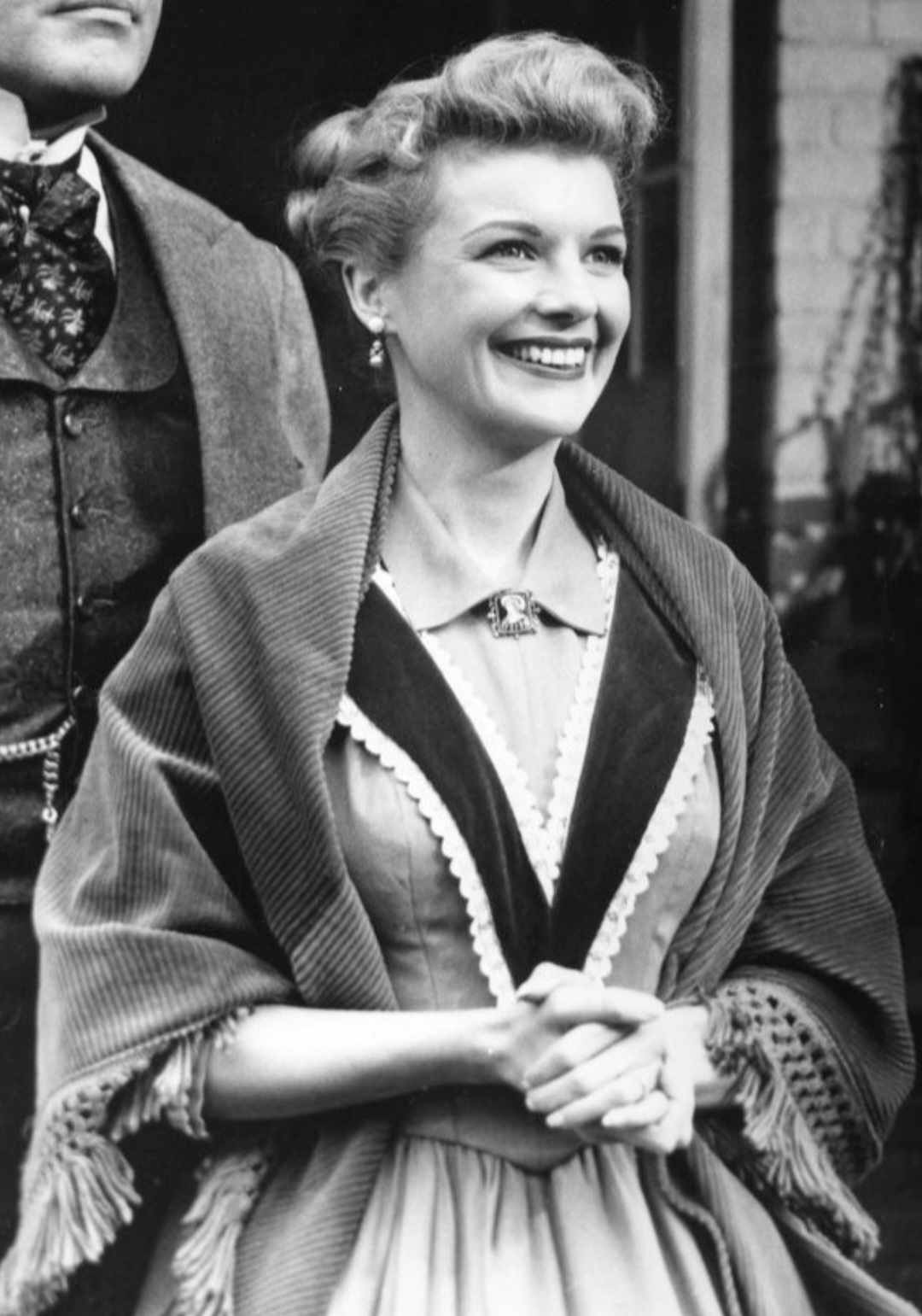
- Leslie in The Californians (1957)
- Born: Nanette June Leslie; June 4, 1926; Los Angeles, California, U.S.
- Died: July 30, 2000 (aged 74); San Juan Capistrano, California, U.S.
- Resting place: Pacific View Memorial Park
- Occupation: Actress
- Years active: 1945–1968
- Spouse(s): Charles Pawley (1949-?); Jason Copage

Nanette June Leslie (June 4, 1926 – July 30, 2000) was an American actress. She was known for playing Martha McGivern in the American western television series The Californians.

== Life and career ==
Leslie was born in Los Angeles, California, the daughter of Frank Leslie, a salesman, and his wife, Alma. Leslie attended University High School. She began her career in 1945 in the film Under Western Skies. Leslie starred, co-starred and appeared in other films such as Guns of Hate, The Devil Thumbs a Ride, Under the Tonto Rim, Sunset Pass, The Miracle of the Hills, Western Heritage, The Arizona Ranger, Wild Horse Mesa and I'll Remember April.

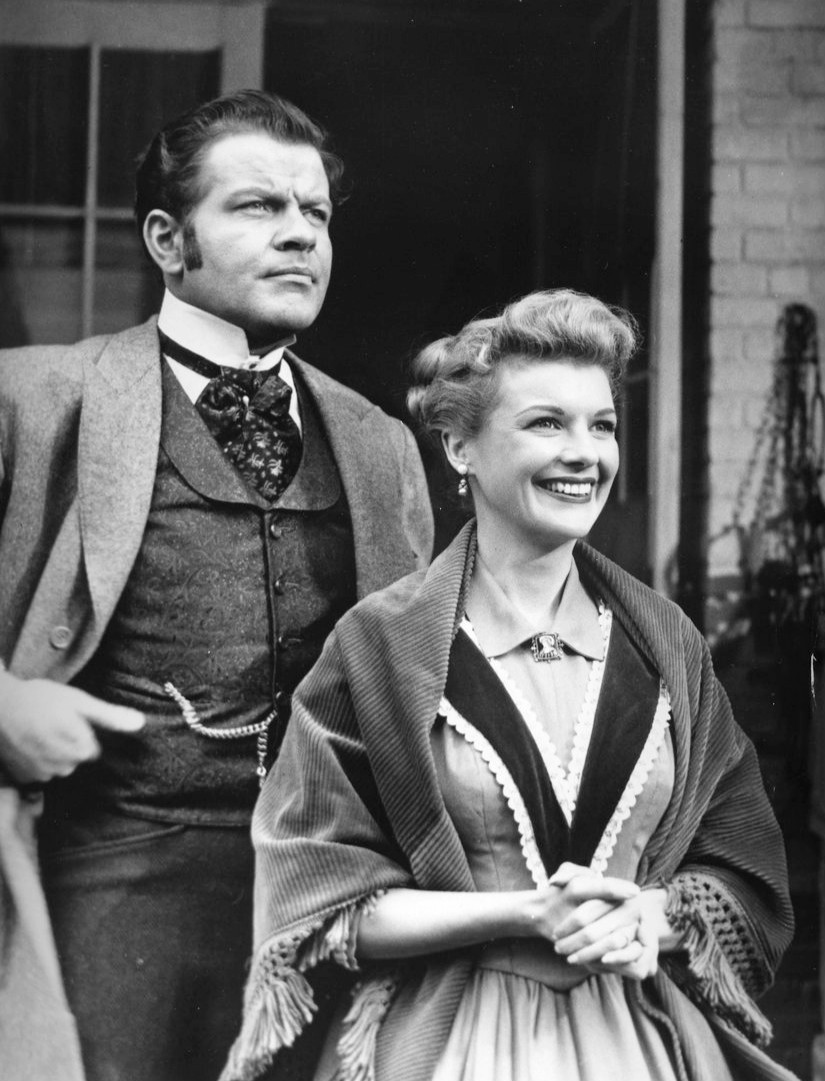
Leslie (right) with Sean McClory in The Californians, 1957

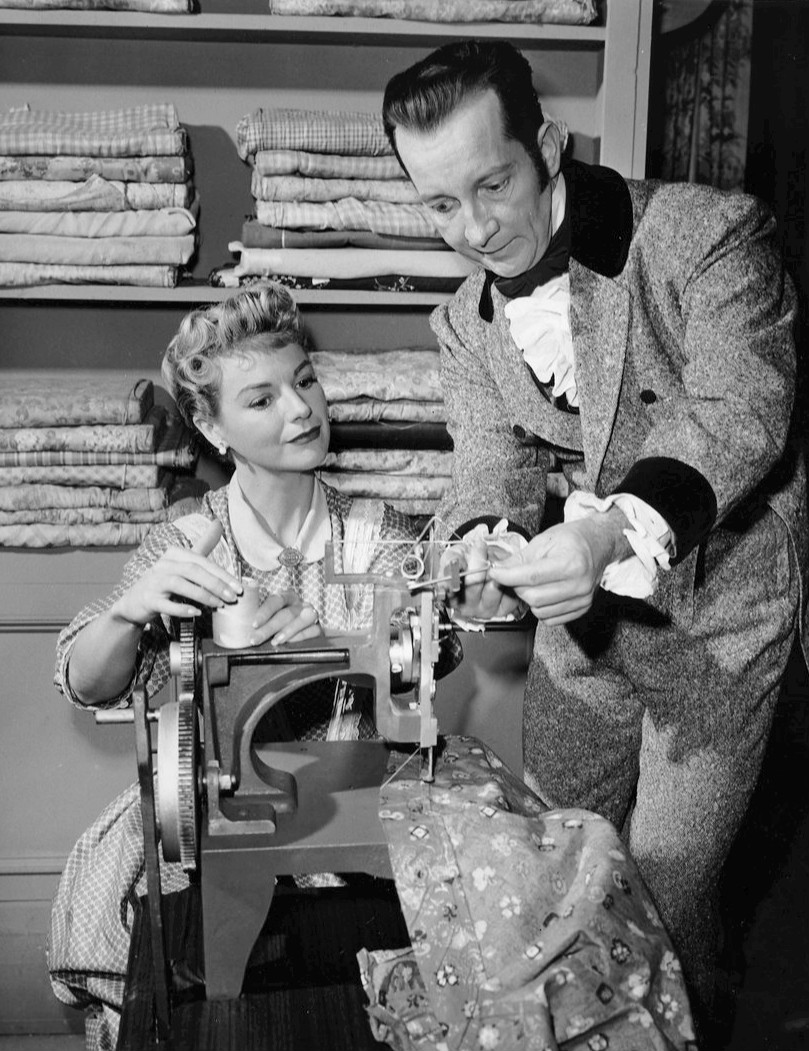
Leslie (left) with Robert Cornthwaite in The Californians, 1958

Between 1949 and 1955 Leslie appeared in eight episodes of The Lone Ranger; the most appearances in the series by any actress. She played Faith Harding in four episodes of The Gene Autry Show, 1950–1955. In 1954, Leslie guest-starred in the western television series Annie Oakley. She also guest-starred in The Adventures of Kit Carson and The Cisco Kid, appearing in five episodes of each. Leslie later joined the cast of the western television series The Californians, playing Jack McGivern's wife Martha McGivern from 1957 to 1958. Leslie retired in 1968, her last credit being for the film The Bamboo Saucer.

== Death ==
Leslie died on July 30, 2000 from complications of pneumonia in San Juan Capistrano, California, at the age of 74. She was buried at Pacific View Memorial Park.
