= Riders of the Range (1949 film) =

1949 film by Lesley Selander

- Directed by: Lesley Selander
- Starring: Tim Holt; Richard Martin; Jacqueline White
- Cinematography: J. Roy Hunt
- Edited by: Robert Swink
- Music by: Paul Sawtell
- Distributed by: RKO Radio Pictures
- Release date: February 11, 1949
- Country: United States
- Language: English

Riders of the Range is a 1949 American Western film directed by Lesley Selander.

== Plot ==
In the Old West, Kansas Jones and his sidekick, Chito Rafferty, ride into Cedar Hill, Arizona looking for work. Entering a bar, they witness a poker game between card shark Clint Burrows and Harry Willis. Harry and his sister, Dusty, own a cattle ranch. Harry owes Burrows $3,000 in past gambling debts. Burrows suggests Harry give him the Willis' cattle herd in exchange for satisfaction of the gambling debt. Dusty, without knowledge of Harry's predicament, hires Kansas and Chito as cowhands. Chito is attracted to Dusty.

Burrows hires the Ringo Kid for $1,000 to rustle the Willis herd with the help of Burrows' henchman, Trump Dixon. With Harry's collusion, Burrows promises Ringo it will be an easy job. To keep Kansas and Chito away from the herd, Harry instructs them to mend fences while he tends the cattle. Kansas becomes suspicious. Ringo and his gang attempt to rustle the cattle, under Harry's supervision, when Kansas and Chito arrive. The theft is thwarted and Ringo rides away. Harry feigns his knowledge of the theft; however, Dusty, who arrives, is also suspicious of Harry.

Ringo, who was promised an easy theft, demands payment from Burrows. Ringo greedily takes $3,000 from Burrows rather than the $1,000 he was promised. Harry plans to leave the ranch for good, but Burrows intercepts and threatens him. A fight ensues during which Kansas and Chito intervene and escort Burrows off the ranch. Harry confesses his involvement with Burrows. Dusty agrees to pay Harry's debt and entrusts Kansas and Chito to deliver the $3,000 to Burrows. En route, Kansas and Chito recognize Ringo as one of the rustlers and give chase. A fight ensues during which Ringo loses the $3,000 he stole from Burrows. Chito also loses his "lucky peso." Searching for the peso, Kansas and Chito find Ringo's money, and they now hold two separate payments of $3,000 each. Searching for the money, Ringo later returns to the scene of the fight only to find Chito's peso.

Kansas and Chito pay Burrows the $3,000 owed by Harry, but Ringo observes the payoff and concludes Burrows sent Kansas and Chito to rob him. After Kansas and Chito leave, Ringo kills Burrows and takes back the $3,000 (Harry's payoff). However, Trump Dixon believes Kansas killed Burrows and summons Sheriff Cole. The sheriff and his posse attempt to arrest Kansas at the Willis ranch, but Kansas and Chito ride away. Harry distrusts Kansas who was still holding $3,000 (actually Ringo's money), but Dusty is uncertain. Chito diverts the posse, while Kansas goes to the bar and forces Trump to disclose the location of Ringo's hideout. Dusty appears and Kansas tells her to find Chito while he and Trump find Ringo. The sheriff catches up with Chito and arrests him. Kansas and Trump find Ringo's hideout. Kansas' cover is blown and a gunfight ensues. Dusty finds the sheriff who is escorting Chito and uses a ruse to divert the sheriff to Ringo's hideout by telling him Kansas is there and she will guard Chito. The posse arrives and subdue Ringo's remaining gang. Ringo rides away with Kansas in pursuit. Chito arrives and helps Kansas subdue Ringo, finding the $3,000 (Harry's payoff) and Chito's lucky peso. Kansas and Chito leave the Willis ranch to collect the reward money from Ringo's arrest, and then move on. Kansas leaves Chito's lucky peso with Dusty.

== Cast ==
- Tim Holt as Kansas Jones
- Richard Martin as Chito Rafferty
- Jacqueline White as "Dusty" Willis
- Reed Hadley as Clint Burrows
- Robert Barrat as Sheriff Cole
- Robert Clarke as Harry Willis
- Tom Tyler as The Ringo Kid
- William Tannen as Trump Dixon

== Reception ==
The film reported a loss of $50,000, indicating the declining market for B Westerns with the spread of television.
