= Wild Horse Mesa (1932 film) =

1932 film

- Theatrical release poster
- Directed by: Henry Hathaway
- Screenplay by: Harold Shumate; Frank Howard Clark
- Based on: Wild Horse Mesa by Zane Grey
- Produced by: Harold Hurley
- Starring: Randolph Scott; Sally Blane
- Cinematography: Arthur L. Todd
- Music by: John Leipold (uncredited)
- Production company: Paramount Pictures
- Distributed by: Paramount Pictures
- Release date: November 25, 1932 (US)
- Running time: 65 minutes
- Country: United States
- Language: English

Wild Horse Mesa is a 1932 American Pre-Code Western film directed by Henry Hathaway and starring Randolph Scott and Sally Blane. Based on the novel Wild Horse Mesa by Zane Grey, it is a remake of the 1925 Paramount silent film of the same name.

== Plot ==
An Arizona rancher goes after a gang that is trapping and catching wild horses using barbed-wire enclosures.

== Cast ==
- Randolph Scott as Chane Weymer
- Sally Blane as Sandy Melberne
- Fred Kohler as Rand
- Lucille La Verne as Ma Melberne
- Charley Grapewin as Sam Bass
- James Bush as Bent Weymer
- Jim Thorpe as Indian Chief
- George "Gabby" Hayes as Slack
- Buddy Roosevelt as Horn
- E.H. Calvert as Sheriff
