= False Paradise =

1948 film by George Archainbaud

- Directed by: George Archainbaud
- Written by: Harrison Jacobs
- Produced by: Lewis J. Rachmil
- Starring: William Boyd; Andy Clyde; Elaine Riley
- Cinematography: Mack Stengler
- Edited by: Fred W. Berger
- Music by: Ralph Stanley
- Production company: Hopalong Cassidy Productions
- Distributed by: United Artists
- Release date: September 10, 1948
- Running time: 59 minutes
- Country: United States
- Language: English

False Paradise is a 1948 American Western film directed by George Archainbaud and starring William Boyd, Andy Clyde and Elaine Riley. Boyd plays as western character Hopalong Cassidy. This film was the sixty-fifth of sixty-six Hopalong Cassidy movies and was the 11th of 12 Hopalong Cassidy Westerns produced by William Boyd for United Artists release.

== Cast ==
- William Boyd as Hopalong Cassidy
- Andy Clyde as California Carlson
- Rand Brooks as Lucky Jenkins
- Elaine Riley as Anne Larson
- Cliff Clark as Banker Waite
- Joel Friedkin as Professor Alonzo Larson
- Kenneth MacDonald as Bentley (as Kenneth R. MacDonald)
- Don Haggerty as Deal Marden
- George Eldredge as Radley
- Richard Alexander as Sam - Henchman
- Zon Murray as Buck - Henchman
