= Jason Robards Sr. =

American actor (1892–1963)

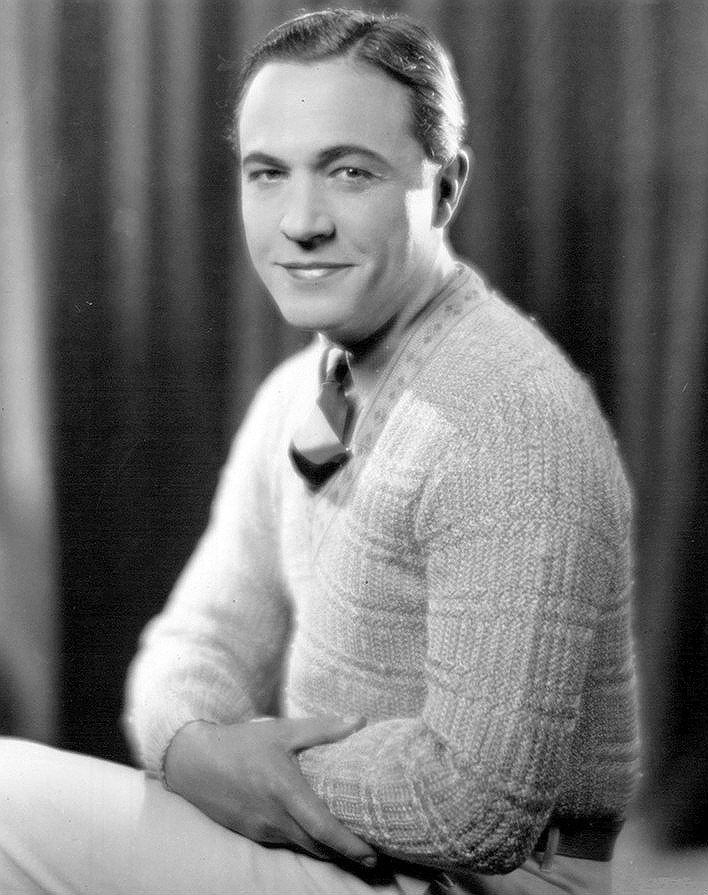
- Robards in 1927
- Born: December 31, 1892; Hillsdale, Michigan, U.S.
- Died: April 4, 1963 (aged 70); Sherman Oaks, California, U.S.
- Education: American Academy of Dramatic Arts
- Occupation: Actor
- Years active: 1913–1961
- Spouses: Hope Maxine Glanville (m. 1914; div. 1927) Agnes Lynch (m. 1929)
- Children: Jason Robards

Jason Nelson Robards Sr. (December 31, 1892 – April 4, 1963) was an American actor. Robards was the father of the actor Jason Robards. He appeared in many films, initially as a leading man, followed by occasional bit parts. Most of his final roles were in television.

== Life and career ==
Robards was born on a farm in Hillsdale, Michigan, to Elizabeth (née Loomis), a schoolteacher, and Frank P. Robards Sr., a farmer and post office inspector who managed Theodore Roosevelt's 1912 Presidential campaign in Michigan. He was raised in Chicago, Illinois. He trained at the American Academy of Dramatic Arts. He was billed simply as "Jason Robards" through most of his career, but in his latter years, after his namesake son took up acting, he was generally listed in credits as Jason Robards Sr. He died in 1963 (after which his son switched from "Jason Robards Jr." to "Jason Robards"). Contemporary actors Jason Robards III and Sam Robards are Jason Sr.'s grandsons.

=== Acting career ===
Robards Sr. in the D. W. Griffith film Abraham Lincoln (1930)

Robards's film career lasted primarily from 1921 to 1961. His Broadway credits include the musical Turn To The Right (1917).

Robards's best known stage role was John Marvin in the long-running hit Lightnin'. Robards's connection to the part caused his son to equate him to the character of James Tyrone in Long Day's Journey Into Night, which Jason Jr. played on Broadway in 1956 and on screen in 1962. In the play, Tyrone is an actor whose career is limited by his identification with a single role as The Count of Monte Cristo.

Jason Jr. later said "One of the most damaging things for me, I realize now, was playing a drunk in the play Long Day's Journey Into Night. In the play, the drunk's father is a failed artist and his mother was a drug addict. It was only after years of analysis I realized I was acting out events in my own life on stage."

In one of his television appearances, Robards played Judge Hesby in the 1958 episode "Dead Reckoning" of the TV series Colt .45. In another television appearance on Leave it to Beaver, Robards played an older gentleman whom Beaver believed was part Native American and could "make it rain".

The Robardses, father and son, acted on stage together only once, in Budd Schulberg's The Disenchanted, a play inspired by the story of F. Scott Fitzgerald. Jason Jr. won a Tony Award for his performance.

Robards Sr. died, aged 70, in Sherman Oaks, California at his home.

== Partial filmography ==
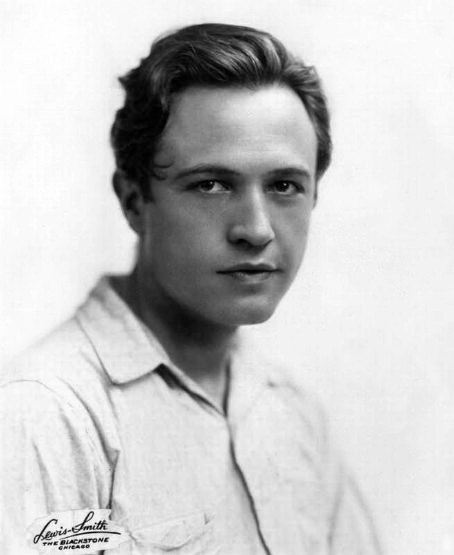
Robards Sr., c. 1915

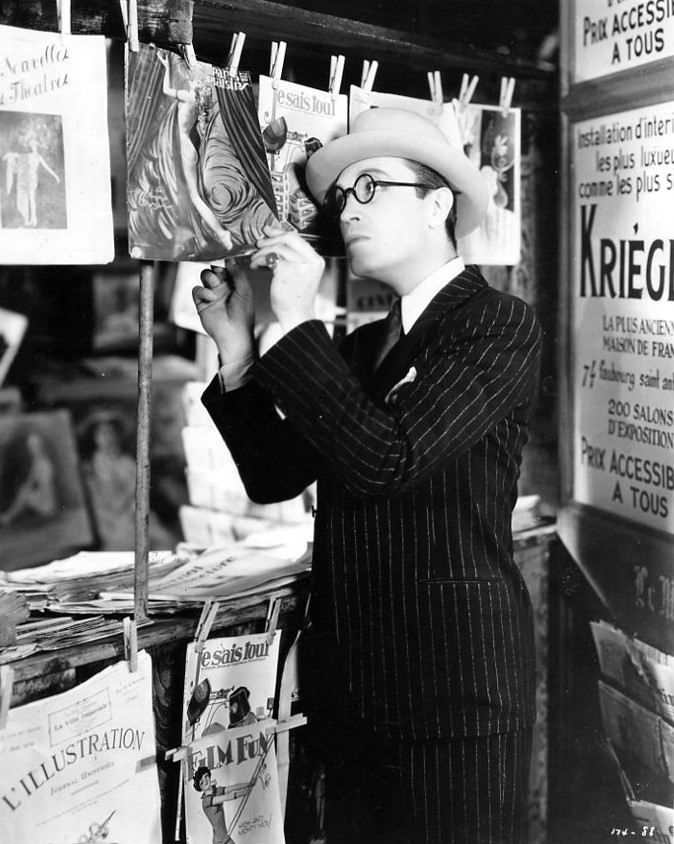
Robards Sr. in Paris (1929)

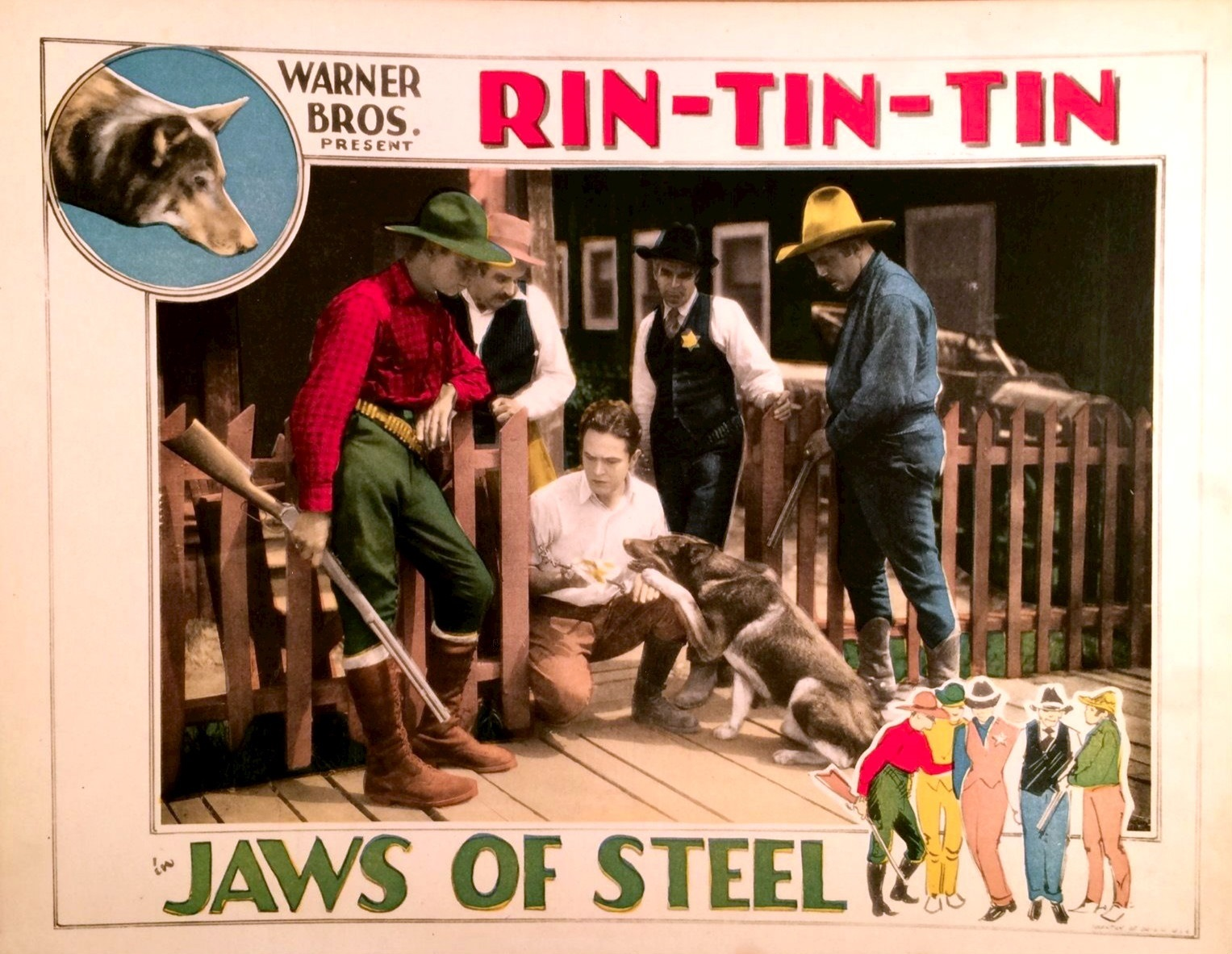
Lobby card for Jaws of Steel (1927)

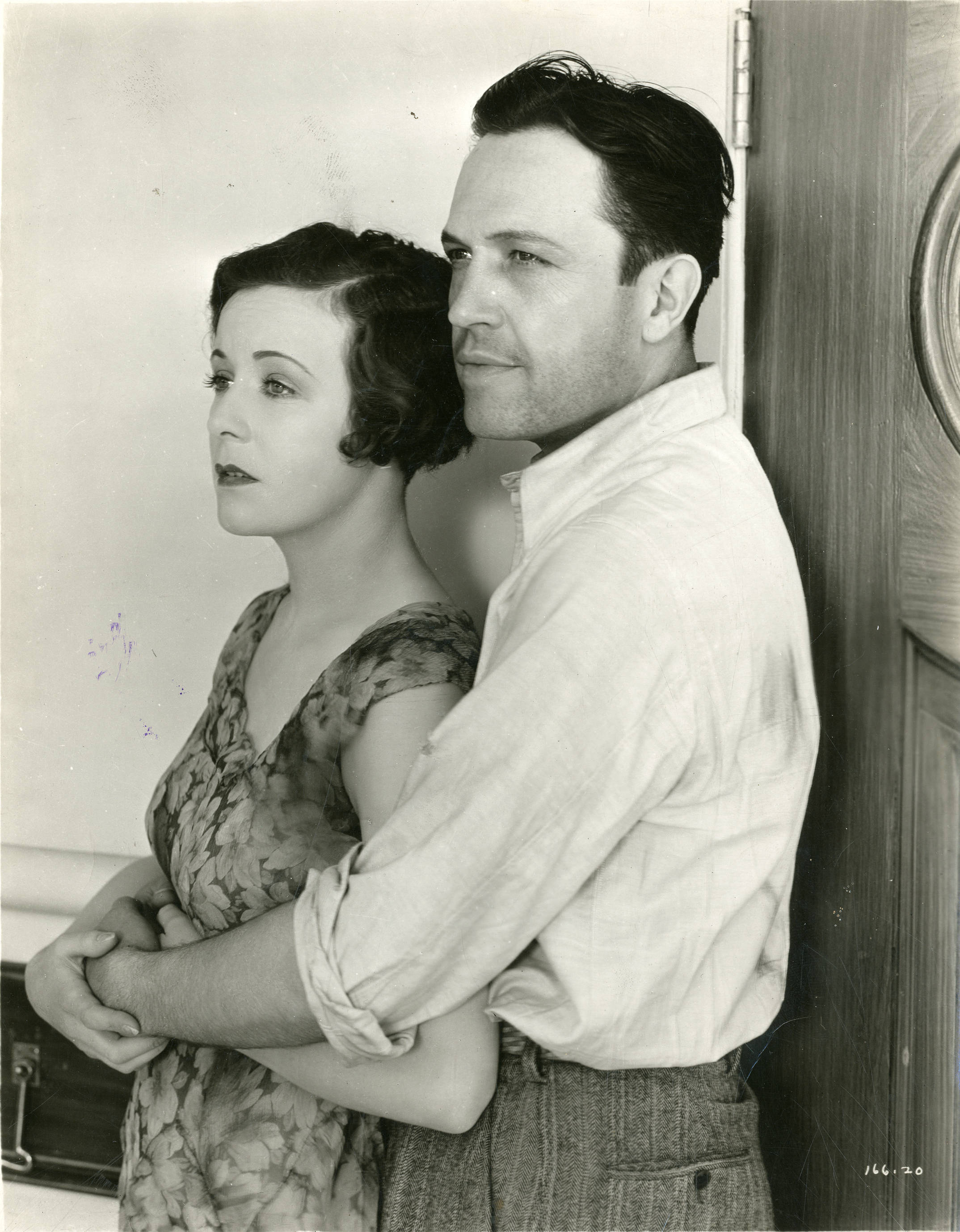
Robards with Virginia Valli in The Isle of Lost Ships (1929)

- The Land of Hope (1921)
- Footloose Widows (1926)
- The Third Degree (1926)
- Tracked by the Police (1927)
- Polly of the Movies (1927)
- Jaws of Steel (1927)
- Wild Geese (1927)
- Streets of Shanghai (1927)
- On Trial (1928)
- The Isle of Lost Ships (1929)
- Paris (1929)
- The Flying Marine (1929)
- Some Mother's Boy (1929)
- Trifles (1930)
- Peacock Alley (1930)
- The Jazz Cinderella (1930)
- Abraham Lincoln (1930)
- Crazy That Way (1930)
- Charlie Chan Carries On (1931)
- Salvation Nell (1931)
- The Law of the Tong (1931)
- Discarded Lovers (1932)
- Docks of San Francisco (1932)
- The Pride of the Legion (1932)
- Slightly Married (1932)
- A Strange Adventure (1932)
- Damaged Lives (1933)
- Devil's Mate (1933)
- Dance Hall Hostess (1933)
- Ship of Wanted Men (1933)
- Carnival Lady (1933)
- Public Stenographer (1933)
- Corruption (1933)
- The Woman Condemned (1934)
- Broadway Bill (1934)
- Ladies Crave Excitement (1935)
- Clipped Wings (1937)
- Flight to Fame (1938)
- Cipher Bureau (1938)
- Sky Patrol (1939)
- The Mad Empress (1939)
- The Fighting Marines (1939) serial
- The Fatal Hour (1940)
- Betrayal from the East (1945)
- Man Alive (1945)
- Isle of the Dead (1945)
- Bedlam (1946)
- Trail Street (1947)
- Desperate (1947)
- Seven Keys to Baldpate (1947)
- Thunder Mountain (1947)
- Guns of Hate (1948)
- Mr. Blandings Builds His Dream House (1948)
- Western Heritage (1948)
- Fighting Father Dunne (1948)
- Return of the Bad Men (1948)
- Rimfire (1949)
- Horsemen of the Sierras (1949)
- Impact (1949)
- The Second Woman (1950)
- Cimarron City (television series, 1958)
- Wild in the Country (1961)
- Leave it to Beaver (television series, 1961)
