= Rider from Tucson =

1950 film

- Directed by: Lesley Selander
- Starring: Tim Holt; Veda Ann Borg
- Distributed by: RKO Radio Pictures
- Release date: June 7, 1950
- Country: United States
- Language: English

Rider from Tucson is a 1950 American Western film directed by Lesley Selander for RKO Pictures and starring Tim Holt and Richard Martin. It was the only time that Martin worked on screen with his wife Elaine Riley.

The film was known earlier as Gun Thunder.

== Plot ==
In the Old West, Dave Saunders and his sidekick Chito Rafferty visit their friend Tug Bailey, who is engaged to Jane Whipple. Tug has a gold claim, and is reluctant to marry Jane because his life is now in danger from potential claim jumpers. John Avery and his wife Gypsy plan to seize Tug's claim. Gypsy hires Bob Rankin to kidnap Jane as her stagecoach enters town, telling Rankin that Jane is one of Gypsy's new showgirls and that she wants to kidnap her as a joke. The plan goes awry after Rankin discovers that Jane's kidnapping is actually leverage against Tug's claim. Rankin tells Gypsy that he wants half of the claim, or else he will deal with Tug directly. Tug learns from the stage driver that Jane has been kidnapped. Dave and Chito persuade Tug to allow them to find Jane rather than surrender his claim. Dave and Chito find Jane and free her when Rankin's gang abandon their hideout after a short skirmish. They take Jane to Mrs. O'Reilly's boarding house for safety. Jane understands that Tug is reluctant to marry, but she is not told why.

Rankin arrives at Tug's ranch offering to split his claim in return for Jane. As they are negotiating the deal, Gypsy arrives, kills Rankin and knocks Tug unconscious, taking him with her. Jackson, one of the henchmen, is left behind to dispose of Rankin's body but is interrupted by Dave and Chito. They see Jackson riding away and give chase. Unable to catch him, they return to Tug's and find Rankin's body. The sheriff and his deputies arrive and arrest Dave and Chito for Rankin's murder. On the way to jail, Dave and Chito overpower the sheriff's deputies and escape. In town, Dave and Chito find Jackson, who confesses that one of the Averys had killed Rankin. Dave and Chito visit the boarding house where Mrs. O'Reilly identifies Jackson. Jane, preparing to leave town, is told the truth about Tug's reluctance to marry. She tells Dave and Chito that a miner named Hardrock knows the location of Tug's gold mine.

Tug agrees to show Gypsy the mine in exchange for Jane's release. Dave and Chito find Hardrock, who escorts them to find Tug's mine. Nearing the mine, Tug refuses to go all the way until Jane is released. Dave, Chito and Hardrock arrive and a gunfight ensues. Chito and Hardrock ride away, and the Averys believe that the fight is over. However, Dave ambushes the group by jumping on John Avery. The sheriff and his posse arrive and the Avery gang is subdued.

Tug and Jane marry, and at the wedding reception, Dave and Chito wish the newlyweds luck and ride away.

== Cast ==
- Tim Holt as Dave Saunders
- Richard Martin as Chito Rafferty
- William Phipps as Tug Bailey
- Veda Ann Borg as Gypsy Avery
- Robert Shayne as John Avery
- Elaine Riley as Jane Whipple
- Douglas Fowley as Bob Rankin
- Harry Tyler as Hardrock Jones
- Dorothy Vaughan as Mrs. Brigitte O'Reilly
- Luther Crockett as Sheriff
- Marshall Reed as Jackson
- Stuart Randall as Slim
