= Stagecoach Kid =

1949 film

- Directed by: Lew Landers
- Starring: Tim Holt; Jeff Donnell; Richard Martin
- Cinematography: Nicholas Musuraca
- Edited by: Les Millbrook
- Music by: Paul Sawtell
- Distributed by: RKO Radio Pictures
- Release date: June 27, 1949 (US)
- Running time: 60 minutes
- Country: United States
- Language: English

Stagecoach Kid is a 1949 American Western film directed by Lew Landers and starring Tim Holt, Jeff Donnell and Richard Martin. It was one of a number of B-Westerns Holt made for RKO.

The film has been described as "a sort of western remake of It Happened One Night (1934), with a rare romantic subplot for Holt.

== Plot ==
In the Old West, wealthy San Franciscan Peter Arnold retires to his ranch with his daughter, Jessie, who despises western life and wants to return to San Francisco to pursue a romance. Mr. Arnold's ranch foreman, Thatcher, sends his henchmen, Clint and Parnell, to murder Arnold en route to his ranch. The ambush is thwarted by stagecoach line owners, Dave Collins and his pal, Chito Rafferty. Later, Clint and Parnell attack a second stagecoach, that they think is the first, looking for Arnold. However, Dave and Chito are driving the stagecoach, along with two other passengers: their friend, Birdie and Jessie Arnold, who is dressed as a boy and headed for San Francisco. Discovering Mr. Arnold is not on board, the henchmen instead steal a strong box containing $20,000. Jessie recognizes Parnell when his mask slips. Dave sees a brand on one of the horses. Dave and Chito leave Jessie in Birdie's care and report the robbery to the sheriff. Clint and Parnell deliver the strong box to Thatcher, telling him they were not able to locate Mr. Arnold. Thatcher sends them out to finish the job.

Mr. Arnold is at the sheriff's office reporting his daughter missing when Dave and Chito come to report the attack on both stages. As the sheriff and his deputies ride off to investigate, Dave sees the two robbers riding into town and recognizes the horse's brand he saw earlier. Dave confronts Parnell in the bar and a fight ensues. Parnell is taken to jail but Clint rides off and reports the incident to Thatcher. Jessie slips away from Birdie. Dave finds her, but they are ambushed by Thatcher and Clint, who know Jessie can identify Parnell from the stage robbery. A gunfight ensues. Jessie strikes Clint with gunfire and he and Thatcher withdraw. Dave intends to camp where they are, telling Jessie he believes their attackers will return from another direction.

Mr. Arnold returns to the sheriff's office and discloses in the presence of the sheriff, Chito, Birdie, and Parnell that his daughter, Jessie, exchanged her dress for boy's clothing. As the entire entourage leaves town to find Jessie, Thatcher and Clint enter the sheriff's office, kill the lone deputy, free Parnell and ride off. Thatcher tells Parnell to leave the area, promising to pay him part of the money from the strong box. Chito and Mr. Arnold find Dave and Jessie. Jessie reveals herself as a girl, which Dave already knew.

Parnell returns, telling Clint not to reveal his presence to Thatcher; and, that he plans to deal with Jessie. Thatcher falsely tells Mr. Arnold that he sold Arnold's cattle for $20,000 and he is holding the money from the sale. Jessie tells her father she no longer desires to go back to San Francisco as she is attracted to Dave. Jessie expresses her attraction to Dave, but he politely rebuffs her. Parnell sees the pair and begins shooting at Jessie. Dave chases him off. Parnell heads to the Arnold ranch house where he demands Thatcher pay him. Thatcher refuses and Parnell kills him. As Parnell and Clint force Mr. Arnold to open his safe, Dave, Chito and Jessie ride up and a short gunfight ensues. Parnell offers to take Mr. Arnold hostage, promising to release him if Parnell and Clint are allowed to get away. Jessie agrees, but Dave believes they intend to kill Mr. Arnold. Dave works his way to the roof of the ranch house and jumps on Parnell and Clint as they exit with Mr. Arnold. A fist fight ensues. Dave whips Parnell, but shoots him dead when Parnell attempts to fire at him. Chito subdues Clint.

Mr. Arnold gives his blessing for Dave and Jessie to marry. Birdie, in a wedding dress, tells Chito she intends to marry him. Chito hurriedly rides off with Birdie chasing him on foot.

== Cast ==
- Tim Holt as Dave Collins
- Richard Martin as Chito Rafferty
- Jeff Donnell as Jessie Arnold
- Joe Sawyer as Thatcher
- Thurston Hall as Peter Arnold
- Carol Hughes as Birdie
- Robert Bray as Clint
- Robert B. Williams as Parnell
- Kenneth MacDonald as Sheriff
- Harry Harvey as Stage Agent

== Production ==
Filming was to have started 26 July 1948. However this was pushed back until October so Holt could make Gun Runners.

== Reception ==
The Los Angeles Times called the film "better than average".
