= Elaine Riley =

American actress (1917–2015)

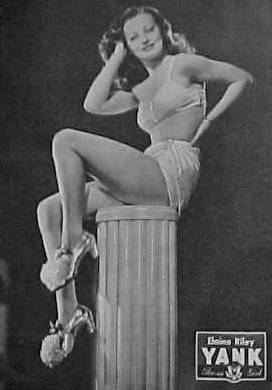
- Elaine Riley pinup photo, 1944
- Born: January 15, 1917; East Liverpool, Ohio, U.S.
- Died: December 7, 2015 (aged 98)
- Occupation: Film actress
- Years active: 1943–1960
- Spouse: Richard Martin (1946-1994) (his death)

Elaine Riley (January 15, 1917 – December 7, 2015) was an American film and television actress.

== Early years ==
The daughter of Mr. and Mrs. A.B. Riley, Riley was born in East Liverpool, Ohio, on January 15, 1917. She won the Miss East Liverpool beauty title and was runner-up for the Miss Ohio title in 1937. Riley also was a graduate of the Traphagen School of Fashion, and was a model for Powers and Hattie Carnegie model in New York at the age of 18.

Using the name Elaine Gray, Riley sang with a dance-music orchestra in several cities, including Pittsburgh, Pennsylvania.

== Film ==
Riley entered Hollywood in 1943 as an extra for RKO Pictures, debuting in Higher and Higher. She left her job as secretary to the managing director of WINS radio in New York City to pursue her career in movies.

In 1946, she signed with Paramount Pictures, where she became a recurring leading lady for Hopalong Cassidy. She worked with stars such as William Boyd, Charles Laughton, Tim Holt and Gene Autry.

== Television ==
Riley appeared in two episodes of The Lone Ranger and in The Lineup in an episode broadcast on January 4, 1957. Riley also appeared as Mildred Stone in an episode of The Cisco Kid. She also appeared in Highway Patrol, Episode 101, "Reformation". She appeared in a Superman episode "The Atomic Captive" in 1958.

== Later years ==
She retired from acting in 1960, having more than 70 credits to her name. In 2004, Elaine Riley won the Golden Boot Awards, which honour actors, actresses, and crew members who have made significant contributions to the genre of Western television and movies. She died on December 7, 2015, aged 98.

== Personal life ==
In 1946, Riley married actor Richard Martin, whom she met on the set of a film. They only appeared together in one film, Rider from Tucson, from 1950. Their marriage lasted until his death in 1994.

== Selected filmography ==
- Gildersleeve on Broadway (1943) as Model
- Higher and Higher (1944) as Bridesmaid
- Show Business (1944) as Chorine
- Step Lively (1944) as Lois
- Two O'Clock Courage (1945) as Cigarette girl
- You Came Along (1945) as Showgirl
- The Stork Club (1945) as Deb
- Monsieur Beaucaire (1946) (uncredited)
- Variety Girl (1947) as Cashier
- The Big Clock (1948) as Lily Gold
- Beyond Glory (1948) as Nurse
- False Paradise (1948) as Anne Larson
- Every Girl Should Be Married (1948) as Young lady
- Alias Nick Beal (1949) as Telephone girl
- The Great Lover (1950) as Passenger
- Rider from Tucson (1950) as Jane Whipple
- Where Danger Lives (1950) as Nurse Bates
- The Hills of Utah (1951) as Karen McQueen
- Sailor Beware (1952) as Commentator
- Steel Town (1952) as Valerie
- ..Clipped Wings (1953 film with the Bowery Boys
- The Caddy (1953) as Bathing beauty
- Pardners (1956) as Dance hall girl
- Highway Patrol (1957) as Ginny Summers
- Wanted Dead or Alive (1960) as Panama in "The Partners" episode

== See also ==
- Pin-ups of Yank, the Army Weekly
