= Dynamite Pass =

1950 film by Lew Landers

- Film poster
- Directed by: Lew Landers
- Written by: Norman Houston
- Starring: Tim Holt; Regis Toomey
- Music by: RCA Sound System
- Distributed by: RKO Radio Pictures
- Release date: March 23, 1950
- Running time: 61 minutes
- Country: United States
- Language: English

Dynamite Pass is a black and white 1950 Western film. It was described by the Los Angeles Times as being "very good of its type" and was released on a double bill with The Secret Fury.

== Plot ==
Near the Old West town of Clifton, New Mexico, cowhands Ross Taylor and his pal, Chito Rafferty, rescue road-construction engineer Dan Madden and his wife, Mary, from Anson Thurber and his henchmen. Madden is developing a road running parallel to a toll road operated by Thurber. After a running gun battle, Ross and Chito escort the Maddens to the construction site, aided by Jay Wingate, who is in league with Thurber, but poses as an advocate of the new road. When Madden's surveying instruments are stolen while under Wingate's protection, Ross and Chito uncover the connection between Thurber and Wingate. To disparage Ross, Wingate insinuates that Ross and Mary are having an affair. Ross hits Wingate and he and Chito leave to prevent Ross' arrest for assault. Ross and Chito conclude Thurber and Wingate are in cahoots to kill Madden as Madden leaves for Denver to purchase new surveying equipment. However, the sheriff arrests Ross for assaulting Wingate and also locks up Chito for helping him. Mary forces the sheriff at gunpoint to free the pair. Ross and Chito engage Thurber and his gang in a gunfight until the sheriff and his posse arrive and arrest the culprits. Declining Madden's offer to work for him on his next project in Montana, Ross and Chito ride on.

== Cast ==
- Tim Holt as Ross Taylor
- Richard Martin as Chito Rafferty
- Lynne Roberts as Mrs. Mary Madden
- Regis Toomey as Dan Madden
- Robert Shayne as Jay Wingate
- Cleo Moore as Lulu
- John Dehner as Anson Thurber
- Don Harvey as Missouri (Henchman)
- Don Haggerty as Sheriff in Clifton
- Ross Elliott as Stryker (Henchman)
- Denver Pyle as Thurber Henchman

== External list ==
- Dynamite Pass at IMDb
