= Desmond Marquette =

American film editor

Desmond Marquette (November 1, 1908 – August 7, 1999) was a film editor for Crime Ring and others. In 1996 he was co-winner of the American Cinema Editors Career Achievement Award.
