= Wild Horse Mesa (1925 film) =

1925 film

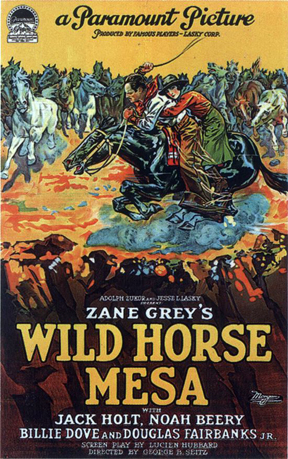
- Theatrical release poster
- Directed by: George B. Seitz
- Written by: Lucien Hubbard
- Based on: Wild Horse Mesa by Zane Grey
- Produced by: Adolph Zukor; Jesse Lasky
- Starring: Jack Holt; Noah Beery Sr.; Billie Dove; Douglas Fairbanks Jr.
- Cinematography: Bert Glennon
- Production company: Famous Players–Lasky
- Distributed by: Paramount Pictures
- Release dates: August 9, 1925 (NYC); September 14, 1925 (USA)
- Running time: 95 minutes (8 reels)
- Country: United States
- Language: Silent (English intertitles)

Wild Horse Mesa is a 1925 American silent Western film directed by George B. Seitz and starring Jack Holt, Noah Beery Sr., Billie Dove, and Douglas Fairbanks Jr. Based on the novel Wild Horse Mesa by Zane Grey, the film is about a rancher who, desperate for money, decides to trap and sell wild horses using barbed wire. The local Navajo tribe tries to persuade him not to do it. The film was produced by Famous Players–Lasky and released by Paramount Pictures. Several prints of the film have survived.

== Plot ==
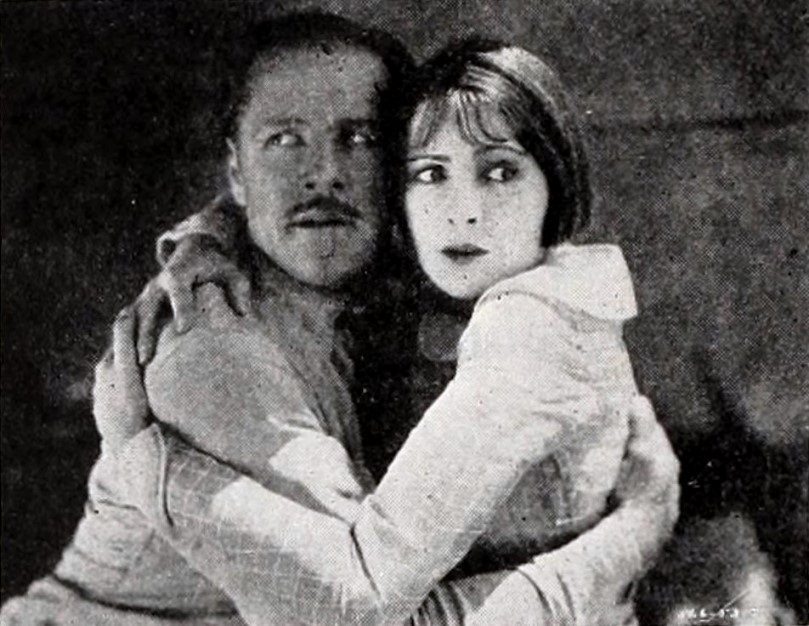
Publicity still with Jack Holt and Billie Dove

Wild Horse Mesa (full film)

As described in a film magazine reviews, Lige Melberne and his men plan to corral a herd of wild horses by driving them into a barbed wire trap in the canyon of Wild Horse Mesa. Weymer stumbles into their camp. He and Sue at once are infatuated. Chess Weymer, brother of Chane, is also in love with Sue. Upon seeing the barbed wire fence built to corral the horses, Chane Weymer warns the party that it will kill half the herd to drive them into the wire. Weymer, Melbeme, and Sue try to take the fence down and save the oncoming horses but the others in the Melberne party attack Melbeme and Weymer and tie them. As the horses come into view Sue, cuts Weymer's bonds and he is into the saddle to head them off. He captures the king horse for his share of the booty. However, when Sue offers to marry him if he will give the poor creature its freedom, he is struck with the pathos of her situation and frees the horse with no fee. The freed horse starts up the side of the mountain and leads the herd away from the wire to safety. The girl then falls in the arms of Weymer.

== Cast ==
- Jack Holt as Chane Weymer
- Noah Beery Sr. as Bud McPherson
- Billie Dove as Sue Melberne
- Douglas Fairbanks Jr. as Chess Weymer
- George Magrill as Bert Manerube
- George Irving as Lige Melberne
- Edith Yorke as Grandma Melberne
- Bernard Siegel as Toddy Nokin
- Margaret Morris as Sosie
- Gary Cooper as Cowboy (uncredited)
- Jim Corey as Jim Horn (uncredited)
- Eugene Pallette as Melberne Townsman (uncredited)
- Tom Tyler as Cowboy (uncredited)

== Production ==
Wild Horse Mesa was filmed on location near Flagstaff, Arizona.
