= Norman Houston (screenwriter) =

American screenwriter (1887–1958)

Norman Houston (1887–1958) was primarily an American screenwriter best known for his work on Westerns.

== The Story ==
Born in Texas, he was found working in New York City as an individual with 4 credits on Broadway in the 1921-1926 period. First as a 2 credits Actor, then as a single credit Writer and finally as a single credit Director; his writing credit was as co-writer for the Broadway play Red Light Annie in 1923.

But by 1924, Houston's work had moved from the stages of the East Coast to the films of the West Coast where he began to focus more generally on his writing ability; between 1924 and 1954, he would be credited 82 times for his 30 years of writing work on films. Indeed, in 1929, he finally did make the physical move to Hollywood and in that year he worked on the 2nd Academy Awards Oscar winning Academy Award for Best Picture film Broadway Melody.

But he lucked out with the Western Movie portion of Hollywood. From 1936 to 1948, he landed a position as one of the principal writers for the Producer Harry Sherman movie series of some 66 movies known as the Hopalong Cassidy series of Western movies.

After 12 years with the Hop-along Cassidy series of movies, which ended in 1948, his work shifted to the Tim Holt series of movies which continued up to 1952. He wrote 19 films for Tim Holt. According to Tom Stempel, "He, more than any of the other writers of the Holts, had the perfect light touch in writing the Tim-Chito relationship. He also tended to nail the script so that not a lot of changes were made after it was accepted. There are Final Drafts of scripts of his that have no blue pages, which was the color used for revised pages. Houston’s plotting could get a little sloppy."

But he still dabbled in film Direction and then film Acting with 3 credits in each area between 1929 and 1935.

Only four years after his last screenwriting, he died in the County of Los Angeles, California.

== Selected filmography ==
- Hearts and Spangles (1926)
- Burning Up Broadway (1928)
- Outcast Souls (1928)
- Times Square (1929)
- Drifting Souls (1932)
- Exposure (1932)
- Midnight Morals (1932)
- Hong Kong Nights (1935)
