= Herman Schlom =

American film producer (1904–1983)

Herman Schlom (1904–1983) was an American film producer who worked primarily for Republic Pictures, then RKO Radio Pictures. He first received film credit as an assistant director for Dracula in 1931. Some of Schlom's notable films, as a producer, include the crime thrillers The Devil Thumbs a Ride (1947), Born to Kill (1947), Dick Tracy Meets Gruesome (1947) and Armored Car Robbery (1950).

== Career ==
Schlom's independent production Li'l Abner was distributed by RKO. This earned Schlom an invitation to join the RKO staff in 1941. He became a prolific contributor to the studio's B-picture production, assigned to low-budget thrillers and series films. He produced The Great Gildersleeve and its ensuing series; he also supervised the Dick Tracy series and the Zane Grey westerns. Schlom developed a reputation for being efficient and economical, and by 1946 Schlom inherited series that were ending, along with their lowered budgets: The Falcon, Brown and Carney, Morgan Conway, Ralph Edwards. Schlom also produced five stylish film noir thrillers between 1947 and 1950.

Schlom's experience with the Zane Grey pictures led to his taking over the Tim Holt B-western unit in 1947. According to Holt's co-star Richard Martin, "“Herman was one of RKO's best B producers. He could get a lot of quality into a picture for a few dollars. He lived with the pictures he was producing 24 hours a day, trying to refine them, make them better. He fought for excellent music backgrounds and outstanding photography." Schlom kept making Holt westerns until the series lapsed in 1952; these were his last theatrical films.

He was also a producer of the 1956–1957 western television series My Friend Flicka, starring Johnny Washbrook, Gene Evans, Anita Louise, and Frank Ferguson.
