= Detour (disambiguation) =

A detour is a temporary routing to avoid an obstruction.

It may also refer to:

== Places ==
=== United States ===
- Grand Detour Township, Ogle County, Illinois
  - Grand Detour, Illinois, a village in the township
- Detour, Maryland, an unincorporated village in Carroll County
- Detour Township, Michigan
  - De Tour Village, Michigan, a village in the township

=== Elsewhere ===
- Detour River, a tributary of the Turgeon River, in Quebec, Canada

== Literature ==
- Detour (Goldsmith novel), a 1939 novel by Martin Goldsmith
- Detour (Brodsky novel), a 1977 novel by Michael Brodsky
- The Detour (novel), a 2010 novel by Gerbrand Bakker

== Film and television ==
- Detour (1945 film), an American film noir
- Detour (1967 film), a Bulgarian drama
- Detour (2009 Canadian film), a Canadian thriller directed by Sylvain Guy
- Detour (2009 Norwegian film), a Norwegian horror directed by Severin Eskeland
- Detour (2013 film), a film directed by William Dickerson
- Detour (2016 film), a thriller directed by Christopher Smith
- Detour (2021 film), a Nigerian crime drama
- Détour, a 2017 short film directed by Michel Gondry
- Detours (film), a 2016 road-trip comedy
- Teletoon Detour, an adult-oriented cartoon block on the Canadian television channel Teletoon
- "Detour" (The X-Files), a fifth-season episode of The X-Files
- "Detour" (Frasier episode), an eleventh-season episode of Frasier
- "Detour" (NCIS), a tenth-season episode of NCIS
- Detour (Transformers), a member of the Micromasters
- The Detour (TV series), an American comedy television series

== Music ==
- LA Weekly Detour Music Festival, often referred to as just Detour, a music festival held annually in downtown Los Angeles, California
- Detour (Christine Allen album), 1980
- Detour (Cyndi Lauper album), 2016
- Detour (Kim Petras album), 2026
- Detours (Saga album), 1997
- Detours (Sheryl Crow album), 2008
  - "Detours" (song), a 2008 single from Sheryl Crow's album of the same name
- "Detour", a 2020 album by Jay Fung
- "Detour" (song), a 1951 song recorded by Patti Page
- The Detours, a previous name of the Who
  - "Detour", a 2019 song from their album Who
- "Detour", a 1962 song by Bo Diddley from the album Bo Diddley's a Twister

== Other ==
- Frolic and detour, a legal term for an employee acting without order from his employer and temporarily leaving the employer's premises
- Microsoft Detours, an open source library for intercepting, monitoring and instrumenting binary functions on Microsoft Windows
