= Narrow Margin =

1990 film by Peter Hyams

- Film poster
- Directed by: Peter Hyams
- Written by: Peter Hyams
- Based on: The Narrow Margin by: Earl Felton; Martin Goldsmith; Jack Leonard
- Produced by: Jonathan A. Zimbert
- Starring: Gene Hackman; Anne Archer; James B. Sikking; J. T. Walsh; M. Emmet Walsh
- Cinematography: Peter Hyams
- Edited by: James Mitchell
- Music by: Bruce Broughton
- Production company: Carolco Pictures
- Distributed by: Tri-Star Pictures (domestic); Carolco Pictures (international)
- Release date: September 21, 1990
- Running time: 97 minutes
- Country: United States
- Language: English
- Budget: $15–21 million
- Box office: $10.9 million

Narrow Margin is a 1990 American neo-noir action thriller film written, shot and directed by Peter Hyams. It stars Gene Hackman and Anne Archer, with James B. Sikking, Nigel Bennett, Harris Yulin and J. T. Walsh in supporting roles. It was released in the United States by TriStar Pictures on September 21, 1990.

Based on the 1952 film The Narrow Margin, it is the first of two RKO reimaginings by Hyams, the other being 2009's Beyond a Reasonable Doubt. The film keeps the same general story, and follows Los Angeles deputy district attorney Robert Caulfield who attempts to keep murder witness Carol Hunnicut safe from hitmen while traveling on a train. However, it changes the moral alignment of some characters, and the setting from the Super Chief route to the Canadian Rockies.

== Plot ==
In Los Angeles, divorced editor Carol Hunnicut is on a blind date at a hotel restaurant with widowed lawyer Michael Tarlow, when a waiter delivers a message for him to phone a client. Tarlow goes to his suite to make the call and invites her to come with him. While Hunnicut watches from a darkened room, the client, crime boss Leo Watts, unexpectedly arrives in person along with a gunman, Jack Wootton. Watts has learned that Tarlow stole from him and Wootton shoots Tarlow dead.

Having learnt that Tarlow was Watts's lawyer, Hunnicut realizes that she is in danger. She delivers her son to his father and urges them to go into hiding, then flees to a borrowed cabin in the Canadian Rockies, telling only one person where she went and what she saw. Police sergeant Dominick Benti traces Hunnicut and gives her location to deputy district attorney and a former Marine Robert Caulfield. Over the objections of his boss, Caulfield charters a helicopter flight to the cabin and meets a scared Hunnicut. At this point, the group is attacked by Watts' men, the pilot and Benti both being killed.

Caulfield and Hunnicut escape in her SUV to a station, where a train to Vancouver is stopped. Looking for a hiding spot aboard, they are told that all private cabins have been booked, but manage to con an elderly couple into giving up theirs. However, Caulfield is seen getting on the train by Wootton and another of the gunmen, Nelson. Eventually, Caulfield is able to meet up with Hunnicut in the cabin without the two gunmen finding out what she looks like. At the next station, he phones his office and speaks to fellow deputy DA, James Dahlbeck, to arrange for police to meet the train at the following station. But the "police" turn out to be more of Watts' men, thereby confirming that Dahlbeck is dirty. After a fight, Caulfield manages to reboard the train. Nelson attempts to bribe Caulfield into turning Hunnicut over to them, but he refuses.

Another passenger, Kathryn Weller, strikes up an acquaintance with Caulfield, who realizes he must protect her from being mistaken for Hunnicut and killed. As he rushes her to safety, another passenger, Keller, gets suspicious and reveals himself as a railroad policeman. Caulfield entrusts Weller to Keller's protection and asks him to use his police radio to inform the authorities of Dahlbeck's betrayal, but he is shot dead before making the call. Eventually Caulfield is seen with Hunnicut and they are both forced onto the roof of the train. Caulfield fights off the two gunmen, before Weller appears, revealing herself as another assassin, but she is knocked off the train when it enters a tunnel. Later, in a Los Angeles courtroom, Hunnicut testifies about Tarlow's murder and identifies Leo Watts.

== Cast ==
- Gene Hackman as Deputy District Attorney Robert Caulfield
- Anne Archer as Carol Hunnicut
- James B. Sikking as Nelson
- J. T. Walsh as Michael Tarlow
- M. Emmet Walsh as Det. Sgt. Dominick Benti
- Susan Hogan as Kathryn Weller
- Nigel Bennett as Jack Wootton
- J. A. Preston as Chief Deputy District Attorney Martin Larner
- Kevin McNulty as James Dahlbeck
- B.A. "Smitty" Smith as Keller
- Harris Yulin as Leo Watts
- Codie Lucas Wilbee as Nicholas
- Barbara Russell as Nicholas' mother

== Production ==
=== Development ===
Peter Hyams got the idea to remake the film The Narrow Margin after happening upon it on late night television. He asked his then employer Paramount Pictures to acquire the rights, although the project later found a home at a different studio. Hyams said: "I didn't think the movie was terrific, but I thought the idea of people being stuck on a train was wonderful." Jonathan Zimbert, who started as Hyams' assistant and was eventually promoted all the way to producer, collaborated with his mentor once more. One of the Carolco executives overseeing the project was future Derailed director Bob Misiorowski. The film was budgeted between 15 and 20 million during production, with a later estimate coming in at $21 million.

=== Writing ===
Due to the lesser popularity of rail travel in the late 1980s, the story was relocated to the Canadian wilderness to justify the lack of alternative transport options, and to make getting off the train appear like a riskier proposition. The Mexican desert was also considered, but due to the passengers' demographics, it was deemed implausible that Anne Archer and Gene Hackman's characters Carol Hunnicut and Robert Caulfield would be able to remain hidden among them for long.

A New York Times article outsourced to Vancouver Sun writer Moira Farrow relayed the filmmakers' opinion that "[t]he title Narrow Margin is all that's left of the original movie. The new film [...] has a completely different story and character, so the word remake does not apply." The manner in which they distanced themselves from the original drew the ire of its director Richard Fleischer, who penned a rebuke to the Times, pointing to the similarities between Hyams' pitch and the film he had made. Fleischer concluded: "How different can two stories get? Tell me, when is a remake not a remake? Maybe it's when the new film costs between $15 million and $20 million to make instead of $188,000."

=== Casting ===
Star Gene Hackman had had several on-and-off conversations with Hyams about working together over the years. He was attracted to the character Caulfield's agreeable demeanor and the fact he did not shoot anyone throughout, which contrasted with the more aggressive types generally shown in the adventure genre. The actor contributed incidental details, such as the glasses and the water pistol squirts during a suspense scene, to underscore that mellow side. Co-star Anne Archer found herself available for this film after opting out of a previously scheduled project, the erotic thriller Wild Orchid. Susan Hogan was selected based on her role on the Canadian-filmed series Night Heat, of which director Peter Hyams was a fan. He reached out to the actress' agency to request tapes of her, and later cast her over the phone.

=== Train ===
The train portrayed in the film is The Canadian transcontinental, which has operated since 1955, and serves what is often described as Canada's flagship route between Toronto and Vancouver. However Via Rail, the country's national operator in the film as in real life, backed out of leasing one of its carriages to the producers due to overbooking. Only an engine and a baggage car actually came from Via Rail. The others were leased from a Colorado-based company, a Texas collector and provincial operator BC Rail. They were then refurbished and repainted to resemble the real thing.

=== Filming ===
The shoot was organized by production services contractor International Production Services. Principal photography began on June 12, 1989, and was reported as complete by Variety in their October 23, 1989 edition. However, the last stretch in October was dedicated to stunts and the two stars had already returned to Los Angeles. Despite their lived-in look, some of the film's locations were built specifically for the film, such as Carol's cabin on Grouse Mountain and a pair of train stations. While Lac des Arcs is a real place in Alberta, there was no railroad stop at that point. The fictional Monashee station, taking its name from the Monashee Mountains, was erected in a locale called Porteau. Some train interiors were also recreated on a set built inside a warehouse on Vancouver's Euclid Avenue, and mounted on an inflatable platform to create the appropriate swaying motions.

Most of the actual train sequences were shot around Garibaldi Park, and used BC Rail tracks to avoid disrupting the busier Via Rail lines. The climax atop the train was filmed between Howe Sound and Cheakamus Canyon near Squamish in British Columbia. That part took three weeks to capture, and could only be filmed a couple hours at a time due to the impossibility of diverting the area's regularly scheduled traffic. The film's stars did perform part of the rooftop scene themselves, being secured by cables concealed under their clothes. According to Hackman, this was the first stunt ever performed by co-star Anne Archer.

== Release ==
=== Box office ===
Narrow Margin opened in the United States on September 21, 1990. It finished in fourth place at the weekend box office with a $3,628,060 tally. By the end of its domestic run, the film had grossed just $10,873,237. In the United Kingdom, the film debuted on January 18, 1991, to what Variety described as another "disappointing" performance. "[The limited success of] Narrow Margin with Anne Archer was a disappointment. It didn't do very well, for whatever reason. It didn't catch on," Hackman later acknowledged.

=== Home video ===
Narrow Margin was released on home video by Carolco subsidiary Live Entertainment in the United States on March 21, 1991. The film had more legs in the home market, cracking the top ten of the Billboard rental charts in its third week and staying there for four.

The DVD released by Optimum Releasing on February 12, 2007 contained curated special features (other than trailers and production notes): an audio commentary by Peter Hyams, B-roll footage, a brief documentary and soundbites by the cast and crew. On June 30, 2020, Kino Lorber reissued the film on Blu-ray in the U.S. with a new 4K master, containing the previous features from the Optimum DVD and a new commentary from film historian and critic Peter Tonguette.

=== Festivals ===
Narrow Margin was shown at November 1990's London Film Festival, ahead of its wide U.K. release two months later. The film was screened as part of a Summer 1991 train film retrospective organized by New York's Museum of Modern Art, entitled "Junction and Journey: Trains and Film".

== Reception ==
On Rotten Tomatoes, the film holds a rating of 63% based on 16 reviews, with an average rating of 6.0/10. On Metacritic it has a score of 53% based on reviews from 23 critics, indicating "mixed or average reviews". Audiences polled by CinemaScore gave the film an average grade of "B+" on an A+ to F scale.

=== Contemporary ===
Contemporary reviews were mixed. Owen Gleiberman gave the film a middling C. He called it "a thinly scripted procession of train-movie clichés", unfavorably comparing it to Alfred Hitchcock's The Lady Vanishes, but commended Hyams' for the real actors' seamless integration into the dangerous train-top finale. Sheila Benson of the Los Angeles Times faulted the film for lacking "any sense of richness of character" although she was impressed by the final sequence and Archer's involvement in it. Chris Hicks of the Deseret News lauded Peter Hyams' "skill as a director of action sequences" and, like Gleiberman, applauded the absence of stunt doubles in some of the finale's best moments. However he criticized "implausible behavior" on the part of Hackman and Archer's characters, concluding: "[t]o say all of this is contrived is to understate." The Chicago Sun-Times' Roger Ebert delivered perhaps the most negative opinion, simply refusing to buy the film's central premise. He deemed it an example of "'The Idiot Plot' [which] is any plot that would be resolved in five minutes if everyone in the story were not an idiot." He gave the film one and a half star out of four.

Peter Stack of the San Francisco Chronicle was more accommodating, writing that "Narrow Margin has a couple of moments of unabashed hokeyness and some predictable turns of plot, but considering that it's designed to do nothing more than provide escapist fare for 97 minutes, and that there are a dozen surprise twists, it hardly seems to matter." Tom Tunney of Empire called the film a "sometimes witty time-filler" with a "well handled finale", although he did not think it lived up to the original's "genuine sense of confined menace". One of the film's least likely defenders was the usually acerbic Desson Howe of The Washington Post. Despite a reliance on artificial plot devices, he judged that some—such as the absence of a phone on the train—served their purpose, and summed up the film as "fun to watch, fun to indulge in". Hal Lipper of the St. Petersburg Times, who had disliked The Presidio, hailed Narrow Margin as "a crackling good thriller" and "a deeply satisfying yarn", harkening back to a time when movies "care[d] more about characters than pyrotechnics or double-digit body counts".

=== Retrospective ===
Retrospective reviews have been largely positive. While acknowledging "a hackneyed storyline", Mike Cumming of AllMovie said "once the action starts, it's hard to stop watching it". Brian Wester of Apollo Movie Guide praised "a sharp and concise script and a solid performance by Hackman and his supporting players". Tyler Foster of DVD Talk called the film a "pretty straightforward, effective thriller". He praised "the skill of Hyams' filmmaking" as well as his efforts to give Hackman "a range of tones to play", contrasting with his harder edged characters such as Popeye Doyle from The French Connection.

Rob Hunter of SlashFilm considered it "every bit as thrilling" as the original, with "fine character work" and "solid action beats". Matthew Hartman of High Def Digest agreed, saying "With only a few stumbles, Narrow Margin holds up well to repeat viewings even after a number of the great twists and turns have been exposed." Matt Holmes of WhatCulture called it "a pretty fine job" and "easily [Hyams'] most accomplished work".

== Soundtrack ==
Narrow Margin

Film score by Bruce Broughton
- Released: May 25, 2004
- Recorded: 20th Century-Fox Studios, Los Angeles
- Genre: Orchestral
- Length: 60:02
- Label: Intrada Records
- Producer: Bruce Broughton

Bruce Broughton chronology
Betsy's Wedding (1990)	Narrow Margin (1990)	The Rescuers Down Under (1990)

The film's score was composed and produced by Bruce Broughton, who returned from Hyams' The Presidio. It was performed by the Hollywood Symphony Orchestra, conducted by Broughton. The soundtrack was not issued upon the film's release. Select tracks appeared on a 1999 Intrada Records compilation of various Broughton scores called Sounds Exciting. A more complete version eventually appeared on CD as part of Intrada's Special Collection in 2004. Some recorded tracks were rejected by Hyams, whom Broughton described as "very demanding".
