= Jacqueline White =

American actress (born 1922)

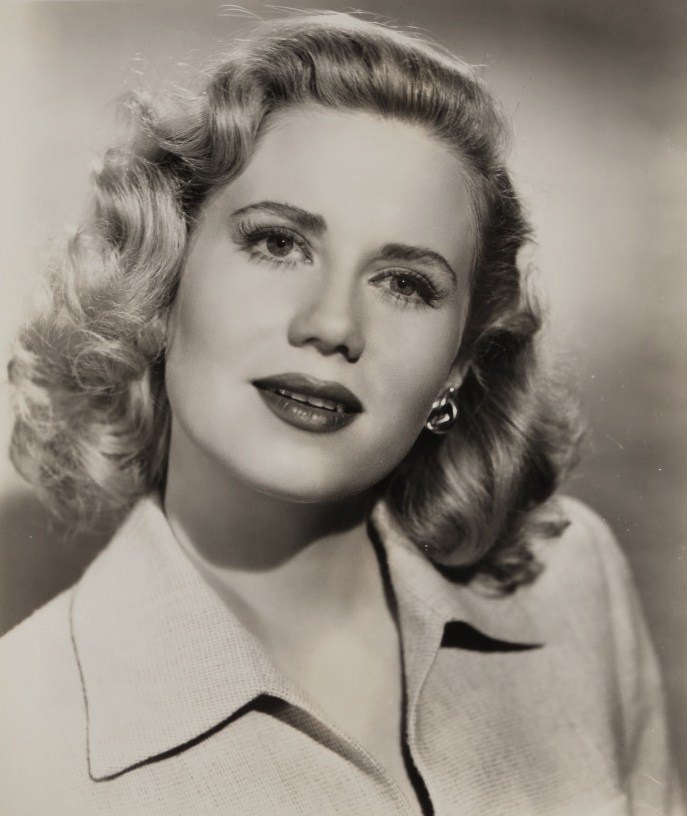
- White in Crossfire (1947)
- Born: Jacqueline Jane White; November 27, 1922 (age 103); Beverly Hills, California, U.S.
- Education: University of California, Los Angeles
- Occupation: Actress
- Years active: 1942–1952
- Spouse: Neal Anderson (m. 1948; died 2001)
- Children: 5
- Relatives: Frank Knox (cousin)

Jacqueline Jane White (born November 27, 1922) is an American actress who had a career in Hollywood from 1942 until 1952, where she was featured in approximately 25 feature films.

White, at the age of 17, signed on a film contract at Metro-Goldwyn-Mayer and subsequently with RKO, where she found her greatest success and is perhaps best remembered for her roles in films Crossfire (1947), Banjo (1947), Mystery in Mexico (1948) and The Narrow Margin (1952). She is notably one of the last surviving actresses from the Golden Age of Hollywood.

== Early life ==
White was born on November 27, 1922, in Beverly Hills, California to Mr. and Mrs. Floyd Garrison White. Her cousin, Frank Knox, was a Secretary of the Navy and a newspaper owner and publisher. She was from Beverly Hills, California. She attended Beverly Hills High School and the University of California, Los Angeles.

White and actress Lynn Merrick were childhood friends until White moved. They were reunited when both were in the cast of Three Hearts for Julia (1943).

== Film career ==
=== MGM films ===
White's film debut resulted from her work in a drama class at UCLA.

She appeared in a few small roles, but her first lead role came in Air Raid Wardens (1943) starring Laurel and Hardy.

A casting director saw her in a production of Ah, Wilderness! and arranged for a screen test for her. That led to her film appearance, in Song of Russia (1944).

White usually played either featured actresses in B movies or supporting parts in A-movies. White was under contract to both Metro-Goldwyn-Mayer, where she was cast mostly in uncredited small roles.

=== RKO Pictures ===
White had starring roles in RKO'S Banjo and Mystery in Mexico and also appeared in Crossfire (1947). Her first western film was at RKO and starred in Return of the Bad Men (1948), opposite Randolph Scott, her nemesis in the film was Anne Jeffreys, those sister played the film stand-in for White.

White married in 1948, then moved with her husband to Wyoming in 1950. When she returned to Los Angeles for the birth of her first child Neal Bruce (1952–2024), she was spotted in the RKO commissary visiting friends by director Richard Fleischer and producer Stanley Rubin, who offered her a featured role in The Narrow Margin (1952), a B-picture film noir, which was her final picture.

== Personal life ==
On November 12, 1948, White married Neal Bruce Anderson in Westwood Hills. She left the film industry in 1952 and relocated to Wyoming with her husband, who started an oil business.

White occasionally appears at film conventions. In 2013, she made an appearance at the annual TCM Classic Film Festival.

== Filmography ==
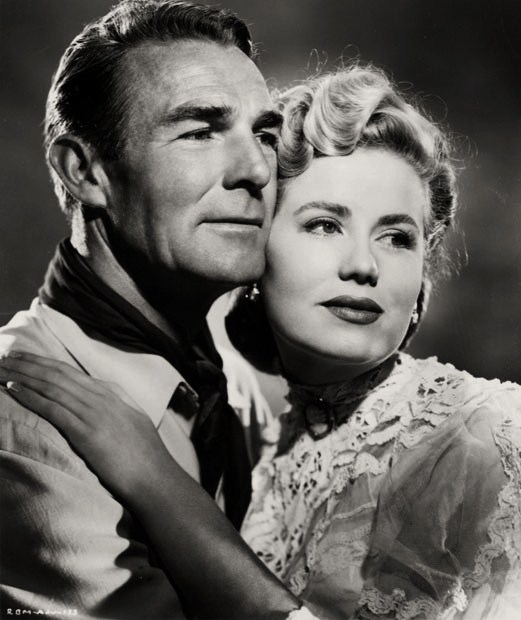
White with Randolph Scott in Return of the Bad Men (1948)

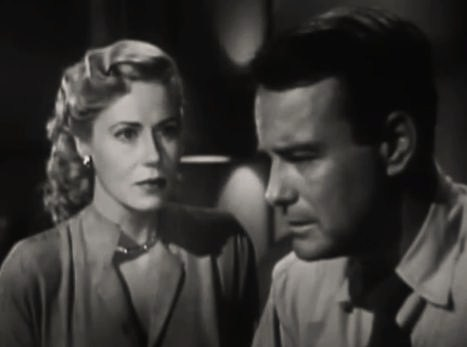
White with Lew Ayres in The Capture (1950)

Year	Film	Role
1942	Dr. Gillespie's New Assistant	Telephone Operator
1942	Reunion in France	Danielle
1943	Air Raid Wardens	Peggy Parker
1943	Three Hearts for Julia	Kay
1943	That's Why I Left You (short)	Mary Thompson
1943	Pilot No. 5	Party Girl
1943	Swing Shift Maisie	Grace
1943	A Guy Named Joe	Helen
1944	Song of Russia	Anna Bulganov
1944	Easy Life	Train Passenger
1944	Thirty Seconds Over Tokyo	Emmy York
1944	Dark Shadows	Nurse Jean Smith
1946	The Harvey Girls	Harvey Girl
1946	Magic on a Stick (Short)	Mrs. John Walker
1946	Our Old Car (Short)	Mrs. Nesbitt
1946	The Show-Off	Clara Harlin
1947	Banjo	Elizabeth Ames
1947	Seven Keys to Baldpate	Mary Jordan
1947	Crossfire	Mary Mitchell
1948	Night Song	Connie
1948	Return of the Bad Men	Madge Allen
1948	Mystery in Mexico	Victoria Ames
1949	Riders of the Range	Priscilla "Dusty" Willis
1950	The Capture	Luana Ware
1952	The Narrow Margin	Ann Sinclair

== See also ==
- List of film noir titles
