= Hell's Island =

1955 film

- Theatrical release poster
- Directed by: Phil Karlson
- Screenplay by: Maxwell Shane
- Based on: story by Martin Goldsmith; Jack Leonard
- Produced by: William H. Pine; William C. Thomas
- Starring: John Payne; Mary Murphy
- Narrated by: John Payne
- Cinematography: Lionel Lindon
- Edited by: Archie Marshek
- Music by: Miklós Rózsa
- Color process: Technicolor
- Production company: Pine-Thomas Productions
- Distributed by: Paramount Pictures
- Release date: June 27, 1955 (United States)
- Running time: 84 minutes
- Country: United States
- Language: English
- Box office: $1 million (US)

Hell's Island is a 1955 American film noir directed by Phil Karlson starring John Payne and Mary Murphy. The film was shot in the VistaVision wide-screen format. Hell's Island was re-released in 1962 under the title South Sea Fury.

The working titles of this film were Love Is a Weapon and The Ruby Virgin.

The film is told as a flashback with Payne narrating the story.

== Plot ==
After being dumped by his fiancée, hard-drinking and depressed Mike Cormack loses his job in the Los Angeles district attorney's office and serves as a bouncer in a Las Vegas casino.

A wheelchair-using stranger, Barzland, hires him to locate a ruby that disappeared in a Caribbean plane crash. He lures Cormack into doing the job by telling him it may be in the possession of the very woman who jilted him, Janet Martin, who is now married to the pilot of the downed plane.

The ex-detective flies to remote Santo Rosario to find the stone and investigate the mystery. When he finds his old flame, her husband is in prison. Cormack, again falling for Janet, is coaxed into helping him break out of jail.

Her husband shocks Mike by revealing Janet sabotaged his plane, causing its crash, out to collect on his life insurance. Janet also double-crosses Mike, who discovers she has killed a man and has the ruby. Barzland returns but plunges to his death, and Mike watches the police take Janet away to jail.

== Cast ==
- John Payne as Mike Cormack
- Mary Murphy as Janet Martin
- Eduardo Noriega as Inspector Peña
- Francis L. Sullivan as Barzland
- Arnold Moss as Paul Armand
- Paul Picerni as Eduardo Martin
- Walter Reed as Lawrence
- Pepe Hern as Lalo (the bellhop)
- Robert Cabal as Miguel (the houseboy)
- Sándor Szabó as Johann Torbig

== Production ==
The film was based on a story by Jack Leonard and Martin Goldmsith, who wrote the story for The Narrow Margin. The film was also known as Chubasco, Love is a Weapon and The Ruby Virgin.

At one stage Fernando Lamas and Arlene Dahl were discussed for the lead roles. The casting of John Payne and Mary Murphy was announced in April 1954.

Filming started 7 June 1954.

The film comes near the end of the film noir cycle and at a time when Payne's unsmiling and fatigued expression in film had become something of a noir icon.

Phil Karlson said "we took The Maltese Falcon [1941] and we did... The Maltese Falcon! In our own way."

== Reception ==
=== Critical response ===
The New York Times panned the film, "All to the credit of Hell's Island — and we mean all—is an unstartling usage of VistaVision, which merely widens some pretty, crystal-clear and synthetic tropical backgrounds. But what a picture! Produced, for no discernible reason, by Paramount's Pine-Thomas unit, with John Payne and Mary Murphy featured, it arrived yesterday with the Palace's new vaudeville program ... It's all slow-moving and obvious and exasperating to find Mr. Payne led around so willingly by the nose ... Mr. Payne and Miss Murphy remain examples of perfect casting and miscasting."

The review by the staff of Variety magazine was more positive, "the Screenplay [from a story by Martin Goldsmith and Jack Leonard] unfolds in the Caribbean port of Puerto Rosario, where the adventuring twirls around the search for a missing ruby. Phil Karlson gives narrative a hard glossing in his direction, occasionally letting down his pace but generally delivering a briskly-told tale in which capable players lend realism to colorful characters ... Payne socks over a hard-hitting role in excellent fashion, and Murphy takes on her first heavy role very competently."

=== Political ===
The film was brought up in a Senate subcommittee investigating juvenile delinquency. Estes Kefauver was trying to find a link between films and delinquency. During one session, the poster of the film - showing Payne clutching Murphy, wearing a bathing suit - was shown to Y. Frank Freeman, vice-president of Paramount. Freeman said the poster was "very bad. There's no excuse for it."

== See also ==
- List of American films of 1955
