= The Gunfight at Dodge City =

1959 film

- Film poster
- Directed by: Joseph M. Newman
- Screenplay by: Martin Goldsmith; Daniel B. Ullman
- Story by: Daniel B. Ullman
- Produced by: Walter Mirisch
- Starring: Joel McCrea; Julie Adams; John McIntire
- Cinematography: Carl E. Guthrie
- Edited by: Victor Heerman
- Music by: Hans Salter
- Production company: The Mirisch Company
- Distributed by: United Artists
- Release date: May 1, 1959; (United States)
- Running time: 81 minutes
- Country: United States
- Language: English

The Gunfight at Dodge City is a 1959 American DeLuxe Color Western CinemaScope film. It was produced by the Mirisch Company, directed by Joseph M. Newman, co-written by Martin Goldsmith and Daniel B. Ullman and starred Joel McCrea as Bat Masterson.

== Plot summary ==
Bat Masterson has signed over his Hays City, Kansas saloon to his friend Ben Townsend in order to cover a gambling debt, and is hunting buffalo to earn the money to buy the saloon back. As a favor to Ben, he takes along Ben's mentally disabled brother, Billy, on the hunt. A conniving gunman named Dave Rudabaugh warns Bat that he should not return to Hays City to sell the buffalo hides. Bat ignores Rudabaugh and returns to Hays City where he must defend himself in a gun battle, wounding the jealous cavalry sergeant who attacked him. With Hays City being an army town, Bat relocates to Dodge City where his brother, Ed, is the City Marshal.

The upright Ed complains that County Sheriff Jim Regan is corrupt and destroys his efforts to clean up the town, so Ed is challenging Regan in the election for sheriff. Ed is in love with Pauline Howard, the daughter of a church minister, but has delayed his marriage for unspecified reasons, though a friend speculates Pauline is reluctant.

In the meantime, Bat enters a partnership with Lily, the widowed proprietress of the Lady Gay saloon. She faces ruin as the Sheriff and his deputies are attempting to force her out of business, first by murdering her husband, then by frightening off her croupiers. Bat confronts the Sheriff and his deputies, but he is ambushed and his brother is murdered. Bat is drafted by a citizens committee to run in his8 brother's place and is elected County Sheriff. He faces a choice between Pauline and Lily and must decide if he is a lawman or a saloon keeper.

Ben Townsend unexpectedly appears with news that his brother, Billy, is about to be hanged for murder. Ben needs Bat's help to effect Billy's escape. Bat refuses, in loyalty to his oath to uphold the law, but circumstances rope him in nonetheless. What's more, he's recognized during the escape; he's removed from office and an arrest warrant is issued. Bat returns to Dodge City to turn himself in, but Regan is about to become sheriff again. A showdown ensues.

== Cast ==
- Joel McCrea as Bat Masterson
- Julie Adams as Pauline Howard
- John McIntire as Doc Sam Tremaine
- Nancy Gates as Lily, Lady Gay Saloon Owner
- Richard Anderson as Dave Rudabaugh
- James Westerfield as Reverend Howard
- Walter Coy as Ben Townsend
- Don Haggerty as Sheriff Jim Regan of Dodge City
- Wright King as Billy Townsend
- Harry Lauter as City Marshal Ed Masterson

== Production ==
Following the success of the Mirisch Productions Joel McCrea Western Wichita (1955), Walter Mirisch decided to make another Western with McCrea. Originally entitled The Bat Masterson Story, Mirisch retitled the film The Gunfight at Dodge City to emulate the success of Gunfight at the O.K. Corral (1957).
