= Return of the Bad Men =

1948 film by Ray Enright

- Directed by: Ray Enright
- Written by: Jack Natteford; Luci Ward; Charles O'Neal
- Produced by: Nat Holt; Jack J. Gross
- Starring: Randolph Scott; Robert Ryan; Anne Jeffreys; George 'Gabby' Hayes
- Cinematography: J. Roy Hunt
- Edited by: Samuel E. Beetley
- Music by: Paul Sawtell
- Production company: RKO Pictures
- Distributed by: RKO Pictures
- Release date: July 17, 1948
- Running time: 90 minutes
- Country: United States
- Language: English
- Box office: $1.7 million (US rentals)

Return of the Bad Men, also known as Return of the Badmen, is a 1948 American Western film directed by Ray Enright and starring Randolph Scott, Robert Ryan and Anne Jeffreys. A loose sequel to the 1946 film Badman's Territory, it was followed by Best of the Badmen (1951). Written by the husband-and-wife team of Jack Natteford and Luci Ward, the film was shot at the RKO Encino Ranch. It was the final collaboration between Enright and Scott and Jeffreys' final picture for RKO.

== Plot ==
In 1880s Indian Territory (future Oklahoma), a rancher reluctantly agrees to take up the post of federal marshal and tackle a violent gang of outlaws ravaging the territory.

== Cast ==
- Randolph Scott as Vance
- Robert Ryan as The Sundance Kid
- Anne Jeffreys as Cheyenne
- George 'Gabby' Hayes as John Pettit
- Jacqueline White as Madge Allen
- Steve Brodie as Cole Younger
- Tom Keene as Jim Younger
- Robert Bray as John Younger
- Lex Barker as Emmett Dalton
- Walter Reed as Bob Dalton
- Michael Harvey as Grat Dalton
- Dean White as Billy the Kid
- Robert Armstrong as Wild Bill Doolin
- Tom Tyler as Wild Bill Yeager
- Lew Harvey as Arkansas Kid
- Gary Gray as Johnny
- Walter Baldwin as Muley Wilson
- Minna Gombell as Emily
- Warren Jackson as George Mason
- Robert Clarke as Dave
- Jason Robards Sr. as Judge Harper
- Kenneth MacDonald as Colonel Markham
- John Hamilton as Doc Greene
- Lane Chandler as Posse leader

== Bibliography ==
- Jarlett, Franklin. Robert Ryan: A Biography and Critical Filmography. McFarland, 1997.
