= Crossfire (film) =

1947 noir drama film directed by Edward Dmytryk

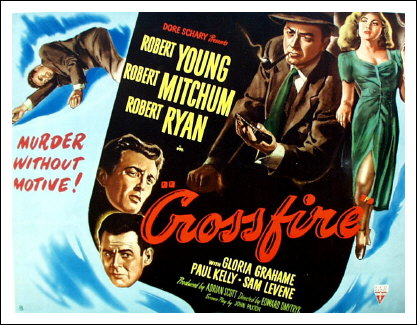
- Theatrical release poster
- Directed by: Edward Dmytryk
- Screenplay by: John Paxton
- Based on: The Brick Foxhole (1945 novel) by Richard Brooks
- Produced by: Adrian Scott
- Starring: Robert Young; Robert Mitchum; Robert Ryan; Gloria Grahame; Sam Levene
- Cinematography: J. Roy Hunt
- Edited by: Harry Gerstad
- Music by: Roy Webb
- Production company: RKO Radio Pictures
- Distributed by: RKO Radio Pictures
- Release dates: July 22, 1947 (New York City); August 15, 1947 (U.S.)
- Running time: 86 minutes
- Country: United States
- Language: English
- Budget: $678,000
- Box office: $2.5 million (US rentals)

Crossfire is a 1947 American crime film noir directed by Edward Dmytryk and starring Robert Young, Robert Mitchum, Robert Ryan, Gloria Grahame and Sam Levene. It is based on the 1945 novel The Brick Foxhole by the future film director Richard Brooks. The plot concerns a murder investigation among a group of demobilized military personnel, where antisemitism is a motivating factor.

Though produced by "B-movie" specialists RKO Pictures, the film proved a critical and commercial success and was nominated for five Academy Awards including Best Picture, Best Director, and Best Supporting Actor for Ryan. It was the first B-movie to receive a Best Picture Oscar nomination.

== Plot ==
In Washington D.C., a former US Army soldier named Joseph Samuels is found dead in a hotel room. Police Captain Finlay suspects that the murderer may be among a group of demobilized servicemen who had been with Samuels and his female companion Miss Lewis at a hotel bar the night of his death.

One of the soldiers, former police officer Sgt. Montgomery, tells Finlay that he and his friend Floyd Bowers met Samuels at the hotel bar and went up to his apartment to find Samuels talking to Cpl. Arthur "Mitch" Mitchell. Soon upon their arrival, a heavily drunk Mitch left Samuels' apartment alone, then Montgomery and Floyd left a minute or so later. Montgomery claims that it was the last time they saw Samuels alive.

Sgt. Peter Keeley, concerned that Mitch may be the prime suspect, investigates the murder himself, hoping to clear his friend's name. After helping Mitch escape from police capture, Keeley meets him in a movie theater, where Mitch recalls Montgomery arguing with Samuels inside his apartment. After Mitch left, he spent part of the night with Ginny Tremaine, a working girl he met in a dance hall. When Mitch woke up the next morning in Ginny's apartment, she was not there. After hearing a knock at the door, Mitch met an odd man, who offered to make him coffee, and claimed he was waiting for Ginny too. While the man looked for some cigarettes, Mitch hastily left the apartment.

Meanwhile, Montgomery and Floyd meet in an apartment. Montgomery tells Floyd to stay out of sight and to keep their stories straight, that they had no argument with Samuels and left his apartment shortly after Mitch. Keeley knocks on their door and asks Floyd about the killing while Montgomery hides. After Keeley leaves, Montgomery – the actual killer – kills Floyd for refusing to stay out of sight, and then stages a hanging suicide.

Escorted by Captain Finlay, Mitch's wife Mary visits Ginny at her apartment, hoping that Ginny will confess to spending the night with Mitch and prove he is innocent. Mary asks Finlay to wait outside, as a cop might make Ginny clam up. Ginny claims to have no knowledge of meeting Mitch, at which point Finlay enters the apartment to question her. Ginny recants and admits to knowing Mitch, but states that she never met him at her apartment. At this point, the odd man appears from a back room and tells Finlay that he remembers Mitch, thereby providing a partial alibi, but not for the estimated time of the murder.

Back at the police station, Finlay questions Montgomery a second time, hoping to uncover the motive for Samuels' murder, but sends him on his way. With Keeley in his office, Finlay suspects that antisemitism was the likely motive for Samuels' murder, since Samuels was Jewish and no person involved otherwise knew him personally. Both suspect that Montgomery was responsible for killing both Samuels and Floyd, since he is clearly antisemitic.

Finlay delivers a personal antiracist message to Keeley and a naïve soldier named Leroy, who was in Montgomery's unit, by recalling the death of his Irish grandfather during earlier historical bigotry. Winning over Leroy, Finlay sets a trap to catch Montgomery. Leroy tells a surprised Montgomery that Floyd wants to meet him and shows him an address he wrote down where he can find Floyd. Montgomery shows up at the apartment where he killed Floyd, presumably to check if he is still alive, and encounters Finlay and another cop. Finlay tells Montgomery he gave himself away because the address on the piece of paper was actually to the building next door; nevertheless, he came to the right apartment, proving he had been there before when he killed Floyd. Montgomery tries to escape but is shot dead by Finlay.

After Montgomery is killed, Finlay and Keeley say their goodbyes. As Finlay drives away, Keeley offers to buy Leroy a cup of coffee.

== Cast ==
- Robert Young as Capt. Finlay
- Robert Mitchum as Sgt. Peter Keeley
- Robert Ryan as Sgt. "Monty" Montgomery
- Gloria Grahame as Ginny Tremaine
- Paul Kelly as The Man
- Sam Levene as Joseph Samuels
- Jacqueline White as Mary Mitchell
- Steve Brodie as Floyd Bowers
- George Cooper as Cpl. Arthur "Mitch" Mitchell
- Richard Benedict as Bill Williams
- Tom Keene as Dick
- William Phipps as Leroy
- Lex Barker as Harry
- Marlo Dwyer as Miss Lewis
- Kenneth McDonald as the Major (uncredited)

== Production ==
This was a prestige picture during Dore Schary's brief tenure as Head of Production at RKO. The film's screenplay, written by John Paxton, was based on director and screenwriter Richard Brooks' 1945 novel The Brick Foxhole. Brooks wrote his novel while he was a sergeant in the U.S. Marine Corps making training films at Quantico, Virginia, and Camp Pendleton, California.

In the novel, the victim Joseph Samuels was a homosexual. As told in the film The Celluloid Closet, and in the documentary included on the DVD and the 2021 Warner Archive Collection Blu-ray edition of the Crossfire film, the Hollywood Hays Code prohibited any mention of homosexuality because it was seen as a sexual perversion. Hence, the book's theme of homophobia was changed to one about racism and antisemitism. Nevertheless, the fast rapport which develops between the artistic soldier Arthur "Mitch" Mitchell (George Cooper) and the sensitive older man Joseph Samuels (Sam Levene) hints at the original subtext. Director Edward Dmytryk later said that the Code "had a very good effect because it made us think. If we wanted to get something across that was censorable... we had to do it deviously. We had to be clever. And it usually turned out to be much better than if we had done it straight."

The book was published while Brooks was serving in the Marine Corps. A fellow Marine, the politically-active actor Robert Ryan, met Brooks and told him he was determined to play in a version of the book on screen.

The film was shot entirely at the RKO studio backlot in Los Angeles, over 24 days. During filming, the working title was Cradle of Fear.

== Release ==
The film premiered at the Rivoli Theatre in New York City on July 22, 1947. It has a wide U.S. release on August 1947.

A few months after its premiere, producer Adrian Scott and director Edward Dmytryk were cited for contempt of Congress for refusing to testify before the House Un-American Activities Committee (HUAC), becoming part of the blacklisted Hollywood Ten.

The US Department of Defense was hesitant about screening the film due to its depiction of prejudice and crime among service members. The US Army showed the film only at its US bases. The US Navy would not exhibit the film at all.

== Reception ==
=== Box office ===
The film made a profit of $1,270,000.

=== Critical response ===
When first released, Variety magazine gave the film a positive review, writing, "Crossfire is a frank spotlight on antisemitism. Producer Dore Schary, in association with Adrian Scott, has pulled no punches. There is no skirting such relative fol-de-rol as intermarriage or clubs that exclude Jews. Here is a hard-hitting film [based on Richard Brooks' novel, The Brick Foxhole] whose whodunit aspects are fundamentally incidental to the overall thesis of bigotry and race prejudice... Director Edward Dmytryk has drawn gripping portraitures. The flashback technique is effective as it shades and colors the sundry attitudes of the heavy, as seen or recalled by the rest of the cast."

The New York Times film critic, Bosley Crowther, lauded the acting in the drama, and wrote, "Mr. Dmytryk has handled most excellently a superlative cast which plays the drama. Robert Ryan is frighteningly real as the hard, sinewy, loud-mouthed, intolerant and vicious murderer, and Robert Mitchum, Steve Brodie, and George Cooper are variously revealing as his pals. Robert Young gives a fine taut performance as the patiently questioning police lieutenant, whose mind and sensibilities are revolted—and eloquently expressed—by what he finds. Sam Levene is affectingly gentle in his brief bit as the Jewish victim, and Gloria Grahame is believably brazen and pathetic as a girl of the streets." In The Nation in 1947, James Agee stated, " ... a gruesomely exciting story ... excellently written and directed...it is, even as melodramatic entertainment, the best Hollywood movie in a long time ... Crossfire is an unusually good and honest movie and may—I hope, will—prove a very useful one." Writing about Dore Schary, RKO-Radio's then vice-president in charge of production, Agee continues: "I do not question the goodness of his deepest motives, and I certainly wish him well; but it may as well be remembered that, at best, Hollywood's heroism is calculated to land buttered side up." British film critic Leslie Halliwell gave it four of four stars: "Tense, talky thriller shot entirely at night with pretty full expressionist use of camera technique: notable for style, acting, experimentation, and for being the first Hollywood film to hit out at racial bigotry."

In an essay published in 1977, Scottish writer Colin McArthur challenged the social reading of Crossfire by several Anglo-American critics, arguing that thematically and stylistically it was a film noir, and that it reflected that genre in being less concerned with the problems of a particular society, such as antisemitism, than with angst and loneliness as essential elements of the human condition.

Critic Dennis Schwartz questioned the noir aspects of the film in 2000, and discussed the cinematography in his review. He wrote, "This is more of a message film than a noir thriller, but has been classified by most cinephiles in the noir category... J. Roy Hunt, the 70-year-old cinematographer, who goes back to the earliest days of Hollywood, shot the film using the style of low-key lighting, providing dark shots of Monty, contrasted with ghost-like shots of Mary Mitchell (Jacqueline White) as she angelically goes to help her troubled husband Arthur."

The review aggregator Rotten Tomatoes reported that 88% of critics gave the film a positive review, based on 24 reviews.

The film was one of two major Hollywood films in 1947 dealing with the theme of antisemitism, together with that year's Academy Award for Best Picture winner Gentleman's Agreement.

== Awards and nominations ==
Wins

- Cannes Film Festival: Award, Best Social Film (Prix du meilleur film social), 1947
- Edgar Allan Poe Awards: Best Motion Picture, 1948

Nominations, 20th Academy Awards

- Best Picture - Adrian Scott, producer
- Best Director - Edward Dmytryk
- Best Supporting Actor - Robert Ryan
- Best Supporting Actress - Gloria Grahame
- Best Writing, Adapted Screenplay - John Paxton

Other nominations

- British Academy of Film and Television Arts: BAFTA Film Award for Best Film from Any Source, 1949
