= Macao (1952 film) =

1952 film by Josef von Sternberg, Nicholas Ray

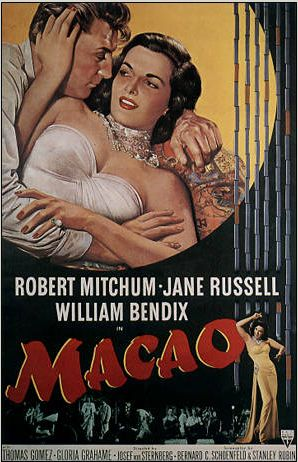
- Theatrical release poster
- Directed by: Josef von Sternberg; Nicholas Ray (uncredited)
- Screenplay by: Stanley Rubin; Bernard C. Schoenfeld
- Story by: Robert Creighton Williams
- Produced by: Howard Hughes; Samuel Bischoff; Alex Gottlieb
- Starring: Robert Mitchum; Jane Russell; William Bendix; Gloria Grahame
- Cinematography: Harry J. Wild
- Edited by: Samuel E. Beetley; Robert Golden
- Music by: Anthony Collins; Jule Styne
- Production company: RKO Pictures
- Distributed by: RKO Pictures
- Release date: April 30, 1952 (US)
- Running time: 81 minutes
- Country: United States
- Language: English
- Box office: $1.1 million (US rentals)

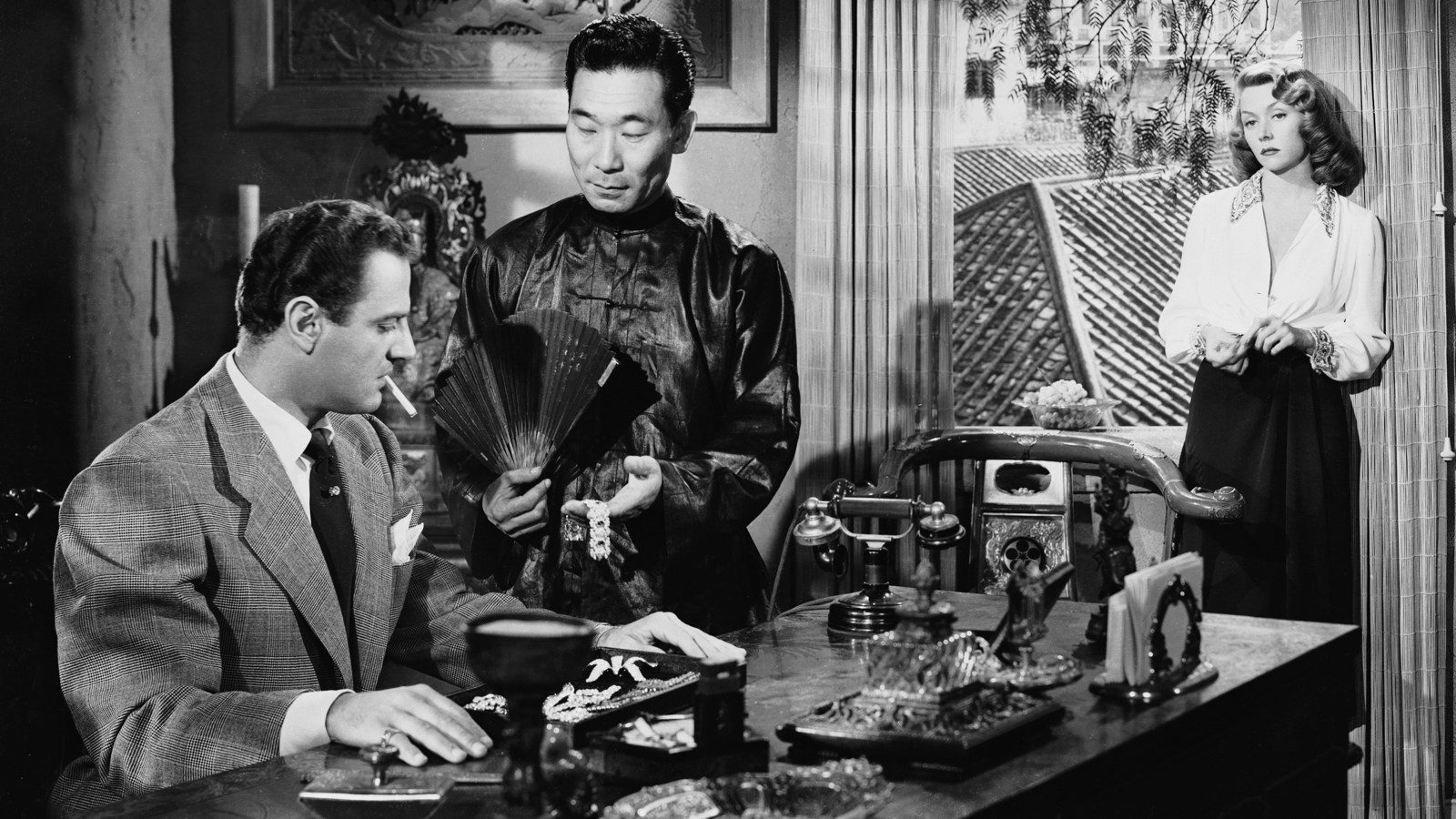
Vincent Halloran (Brad Dexter), Itzumi (Philip Ahn) and Margie (Gloria Grahame), head croupier at Halloran's gambling den, "Quick Reward"

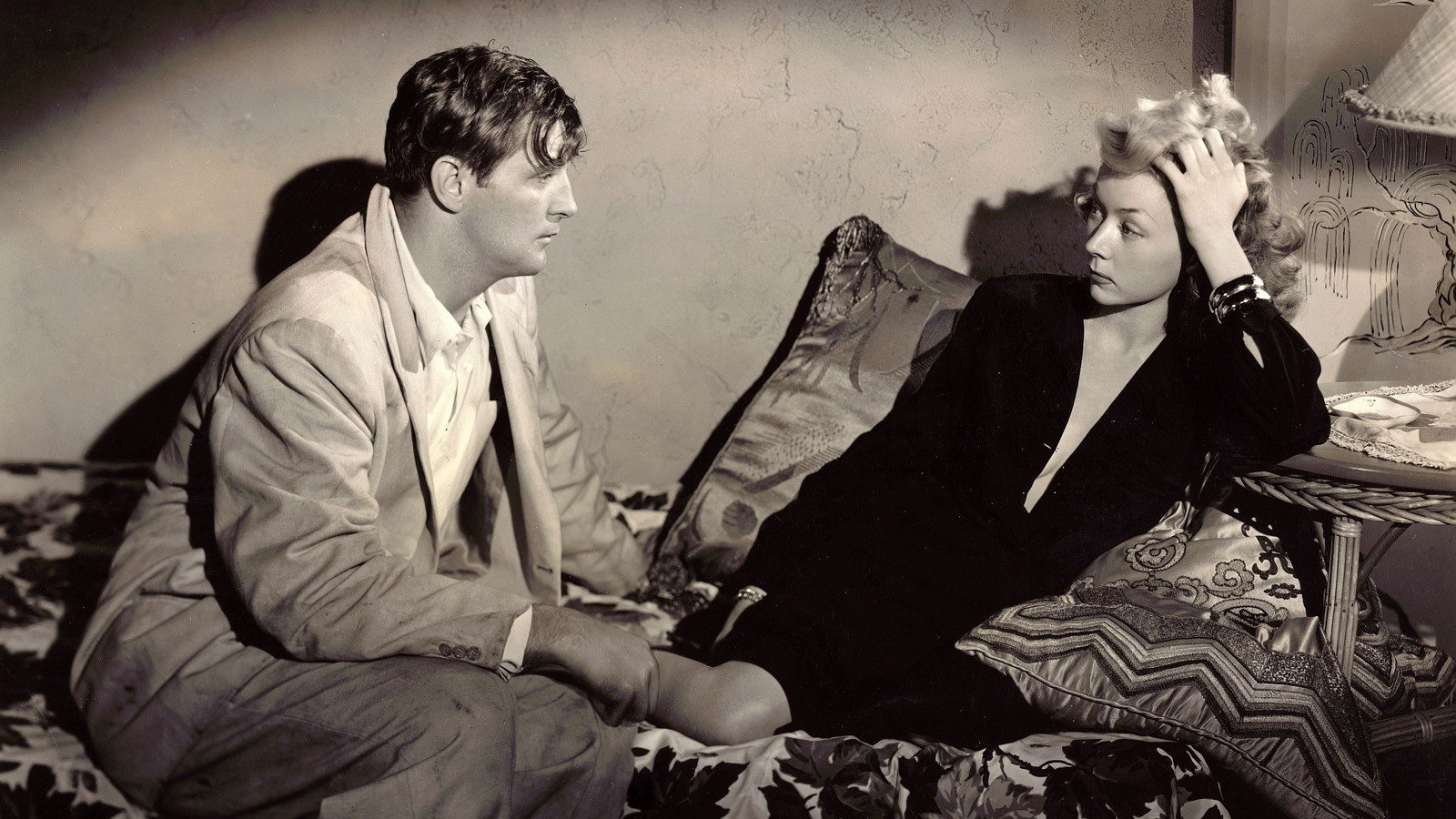
Nick Cochran (Robert Mitchum) and Margie (Gloria Grahame)

Macao is a 1952 American adventure film noir directed by Josef von Sternberg and Nicholas Ray and starring Robert Mitchum, Jane Russell, William Bendix, and Gloria Grahame. Shot in black-and-white, it was distributed by RKO Pictures.

== Plot ==
The movie opens with the murder of New York City Detective Lieutenant Danial Lombardy, his body discovered in Hong Kong waters.

Three strangers arrive on the same ship at the port of Macao, then under Portuguese rule, 30 miles (48 km) off colonial Hong Kong: Nick Cochran, a cynical, but honest ex-serviceman, Julie Benton, an equally cynical, sultry, and well-traveled night club singer, and Lawrence Trumble, a jovial traveling salesman who deals in coconut oil, silk stockings, cigars and contraband.

Corrupt police lieutenant Sebastian notifies casino owner and underworld boss Vincent Halloran about the new arrivals. Halloran has been tipped off about an undercover New York City policeman out to lure him into international waters so he can be arrested by British police for the murder of Detective Lombardy. With only three strangers to choose from, Sebastian informs Halloran that Nick is the cop. Halloran hires Julie as a singer, in part to find out what she knows about Nick. He then tries to bribe a puzzled Nick to leave Macao, but Nick is interested in getting to know the curvaceous Julie better and turns him down.

Later, Trumble offers the broke Nick a lucrative commission to help him sell a hot diamond necklace, which he accepts as a means of getting a nest egg to start a life together somewhere with Julie. However, when Nick shows Halloran a diamond from the necklace, Halloran recognizes it as part of the same cache he had sent to Hong Kong only a week earlier to be sold. Now certain of Nick's identity, he lays a trap for Nick, who gets knocked out and taken prisoner.

Nick is guarded by two thugs and Halloran's girlfriend and head croupier, Margie. Worried that Halloran is planning to dump her for Julie, the jealous Margie helps Nick escape, with instructions to take Julie with him when he goes. The thugs discover Nick is missing and headed by Halloran's murderous henchman, Itzumi, pursue him on a wild chase down to the waterfront. When Trumble happens on the late-night fracas he tries to help Nick, and, mistaken by the thugs for him, is killed. Before dying he tells Nick about having used him in an attempt to entrap Halloran, and the police boat patrolling offshore to capture the dangerous fugitive from justice if he can still be lured beyond territorial waters.

When Nick tries to get Julie to go away with him, he learns that Halloran has invited her on a trip to Hong Kong to retrieve his expensive necklace, a rendezvous he instructs her to keep. Nick lurks by the dock and disposes of Itzumi. Taking his place at the helm of Halloran's boat, he steers the unsuspecting kingpin toward the waiting police. After a violent fistfight with Halloran that leaves the mobster unconscious in the water, Nick swims him over to the British authorities.

The movie ends with Nick and Julie in a clinch, implying they will head home together to the United States, she having earlier expressed her homesickness to him and he sharing that Trumble had cleared up an outstanding shooting charge against him in New York that had left him an involuntary exile ever since.

== Cast ==
- Robert Mitchum as Nick Cochran, former US Signal Corps lieutenant with 3 years, 5 months and 26 days of service (e.g. US direct involvement in WW II lasted 3 years, 8 months, 26 days)
- Jane Russell as Julie Benton
- William Bendix as Lawrence C. Trumble
- Thomas Gomez as Police Lt. Felizardo José Espirito Sebastian
- Gloria Grahame as Margie
- Brad Dexter as Vincent "Vince" Halloran
- Edward Ashley as Martin Stewart
- Philip Ahn as Itzumi
- Vladimir Sokoloff as Kwan Sum Tang
- Emory Parnell as Ship's Captain

== Production ==
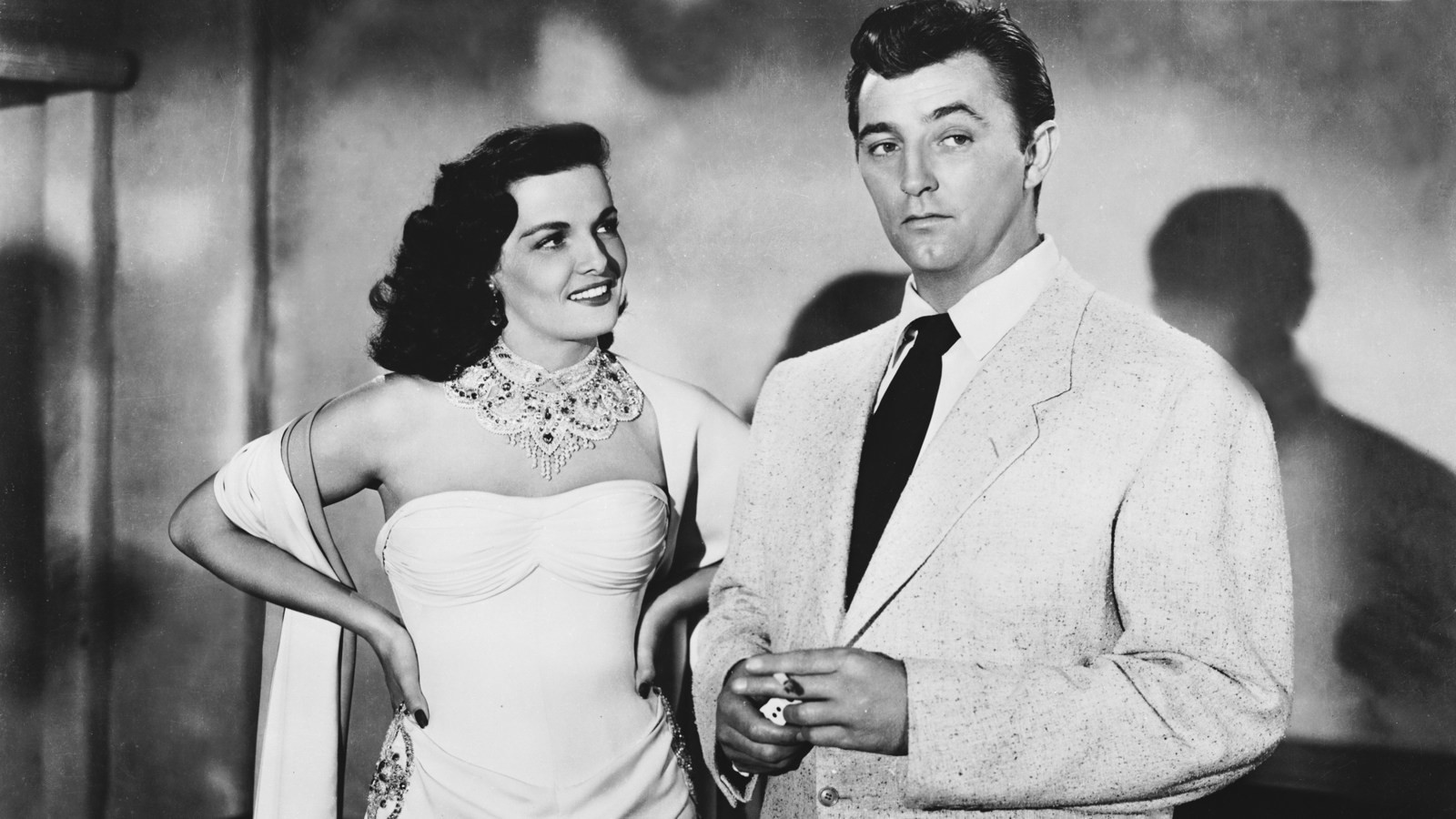
Julie Benton (Jane Russell) and Nick Cochran (Robert Mitchum), "crackling magnetism"

Macao was the second feature that Josef von Sternberg filmed to fulfill a two-picture contract with RKO Pictures then owned by Howard Hughes. (Sternberg's first feature for Hughes was the color epic Jet Pilot). Shooting began in September 1950 and the film was released in April 1952.

Sternberg's habit of handling actors "as mere details of décor" elicited strenuous objections from stars Jane Russell and Gloria Grahame such that "the shooting of Macao has become a minor legend." John Baxter reports that "fights on the set" were not uncommon, and were manifested in the "strained" performances of the cast.

During the final stages of filming, director Nicholas Ray was enlisted to perform retakes on a critical fistfight scene between Robert Mitchum and Brad Dexter, because Sternberg's handling was deemed unsatisfactory by producer Alex Gottlieb. Although uncredited, Ray's contribution to the film was recognized by Sternberg.

Sternberg, who "despised the script and the close control" by the studio "disowned" responsibility for the production.

Only B-roll footage was shot on location in Hong Kong and Macau. TV actor and host Truman Bradley narrated the film's opening.

Musical Direction –Constantin Bakaleinikoff
Art Direction – Albert S. D'Agostino and Ralph Berger
Photography – Harry J. Wild
Scriptwriter – Bernard C. Schoenfeld and Stanley Rubin
Set Decoration – Darrell Silvera and Harvey Miller
Costumes – Michael Woulfe

Editing – Samuel E. Beetley and Robert Golden

Jane Russell sings the Johnny Mercer and Harold Arlen ballad "One for My Baby (and One More for the Road)", and the Jule Styne and Leo Robin tune "You Kill Me"

== Reception ==
The film recorded a loss of $700,000. Biographer Herman G. Weinberg called the film "a critical and box-office fiasco."

== Critical response ==
"Even with a mechanically meaningless assignment like Macao, Sternberg's visual signature smiles through the veils and nets like the Cheshire Cat à la Chautard. That he chose to come to terms with an often uncongenial creative environment simply marks him as an artist who preferred lighting up a small shadow to cursing the darkness."

— Film historian Andrew Sarris (1966)

Director Josef von Sternberg on directing Macao: “After Jet Pilot (1957), I made one more film in accordance with the [RKO] contract I had foolishly accepted. This was made under the supervision of six different men in charge. It was called Macao, and instead of fingers in that pie, half a dozen clowns immersed various parts of their anatomy in it. Their names do not appear on the list of credits.”

— from von Sternberg’s autobiography Fun in a Chinese Laundry (1965).

Critic Bosley Crowther, writing for The New York Times in 1952, lambasted the characters as "flimflam" and the story "pedestrian", despite some "well-placed direction by Josef von Sternberg in a couple of scenes."

Film historian Andrew Sarris in his appraisal of Sternberg's films for Museum of Modern Art (MOMA), deplores Macao as a series of "visual coups" assembled "to conceal the meaninglessness of the [on-screen] action ..." Whereas Sarris praises the majority of Sternberg's films "for their unity of form and function", Macao proves "how superficial mere style can be."

A particular concern of the Brooklyn Eagle's reviewer was the anything-but-novel setting and atmosphere: "But the plot is one that has seen long service, and that went over big before the war, when a Far East locale definitely established a picture as super-sinister in tone, and the action took the form of thrown knives and clutching hands. 'Macao' has retained the general air of menace along with the arthritic plot....'Macao' may have a story that has seen better days, but Jane Russell's clothes are strictly from now. That's what distinguishes 'Macao' from other films of its type."

The New York Post predicted success for the production: "It is contrived but nevertheless absorbing....Streetlines—if they still stand on them for anything—are predicted for 'Macao' and they'll get their money's worth."

Journalist and filmmaker John Baxter, writing for the International Film Guide Series, has a higher opinion of the film and lauds the "bravura passages" and the "atmosphere and décor that make the work definitively "Sternbergian". Both Sarris and Baxter acknowledge Sternberg's stylistic signature in the deadly waterfront chase amid the docked fishing boats, as well as the amusing bedroom scene where an electric fan reduces a pillow to "a storm of feathers."

In 2005, film critic Dennis Schwartz, writing for Ozus' World Movie Reviews, lauded the casting of Jane Russell and Robert Mitchum:

A wonderfully tongue-in-cheek scripted RKO adventure story directed by Josef von Sternberg ... Jane Russell enthralls as she gets romanced by the laconic Mitchum, and they create movie magic together through their brilliant nuanced performances ... She's the good-bad girl, while he's the hard-luck innocent who can't even win when playing with loaded dice ... If you are looking for an underrated film noir gem—that somehow got swept under the rug—this is it!

Baxter laments that Macao, though "not a classic work ... ill-deserves its present obscurity."

== Sources ==
- Baxter, John. 1971. The Cinema of Josef von Sternberg. The International Film Guide Series. A.S Barners & Company, New York.
- Sarris, Andrew. 1966. The Films of Josef von Sternberg. Museum of Modern Art/Doubleday. New York, New York.
