= Blind Spot (1947 film) =

1947 film by Robert Gordon

- Theatrical release poster
- Directed by: Robert Gordon
- Screenplay by: Martin Goldsmith
- Produced by: Ted Richmond
- Starring: Chester Morris; Constance Dowling; Steven Geray; Sid Tomack
- Cinematography: George Meehan
- Edited by: Henry Batista
- Music by: Paul Sawtell
- Production company: Columbia Pictures
- Distributed by: Columbia Pictures
- Release date: February 6, 1947
- Running time: 73 minutes
- Country: United States
- Language: English

Blind Spot is a 1947 American mystery thriller film noir directed by Robert Gordon and starring Chester Morris, Constance Dowling, and Steven Geray.

== Plot ==
In New York City, Jeffrey Andrews is a disheveled, alcoholic novelist, living in a cluttered apartment. He leaves his apartment intoxicated to confront his publisher Henry Small, to settle a pay dispute. At Small's office, Andrews barges past secretary Evelyn Green to meet with Small, who has been conferring with best-selling mystery novelist Lloyd Harrison. Declining to pay Andrews more money, Small suggests that Andrews should write more marketable books in contrast to Harrison, who admires Andrews' psychological novels. Andrews declines, as he views mysteries as formulaic, relying on red herrings and other devices. Harrison counters that the solutions must be completely logical.

Andrews offers Small a plot outline for a whodunit in return for a cash advance. Small declines but encouraged by Harrison, Andrews improvises a plot of a locked-room murder mystery, though he doesn't reveal how the victim was killed and the murderer escaped. After he leaves, Harrison also complains about his contract and Small calls Evelyn into his office.

Andrews retreats to a bar in the office building, where he talks about his imagined plot to the bartender but doesn't see Harrison as he passes by. Evelyn soon arrives with a torn dress, having learned about Andrews whose novels she admires. The two converse while drinking and Andrews returns to Small's office. There, Andrews finds his contract inside the file drawer and tears it. Sometime later, police detective Lieutenant Fred Applegate arrests Andrews on suspicion for murdering Small, whose body was found in his inner office, which was locked from the inside.

Applegate interrogates Andrews on how he committed the murder similar to his story, but Andrews is too drunk to remember the ending. While Evelyn is nowhere to be found, Harrison arrives at the crime scene and suggests that Applegate release Andrews into his custody, where he might reveal how the murder was committed. At Harrison's apartment, Andrews is still unable to remember the ending. That night, Andrews sneaks out to find the bartender he spoke to. A night watchman takes him to the bartender's apartment, where Andrews finds the bartender has been killed. When Andrews finds one of Evelyn's earrings beside the body, he is shot by the watchman but escapes.

Andrews returns to his apartment, which is under police surveillance, and finds Evelyn there. Each is suspicious of the other, but Evelyn claims to have fallen in love with Andrews. At a diner, Andrews identifies Evelyn has the mate to the earring he had seen and decides to turn her over to the police, despite Evelyn not knowing about the second murder. On their way to the police station, Andrews changes his mind when inside his coat pocket, he finds a check written to him by Small. Andrews deduces Small had planned to purchase Andrews' story and Harrison must have been present at that time.

Andrews and Evelyn confront Harrison inside his apartment, but Harrison attempts for Andrews to doubt his story. He also prompts Andrews to remember the solution to his locked-room mystery. Immediately, the police arrive and arrest Andrews. At police headquarters, Andrews, under frustration, confesses to Small's murder despite not remembering. However, he refuses to confess to the bartender's murder, for which Applegate suspects Evelyn. Andrews however suspects Harrison had stolen one of Evelyn's earrings and used it to frame Evelyn. Applegate also finds Harrison's contract with Small is absent within the evidence collected.

The night watchman suddenly enters, revealing that the bartender told him that Harrison had been in the bar on the night of the murder but had left, supposedly to wash his hands, giving him time to have killed Small. The watchman pulls a gun on Harrison but is disarmed by Andrews. Harrison then retrieves his own pistol but he is shot by Applegate. Before dying, Harrison confesses to the murder because Small threatened to expose him for having used a ghostwriter. Harrison then killed the bartender to cover his tracks. Andrews and Evelyn leave the station together as the sun rises.

== Cast ==
- Chester Morris as Jeffrey Andrews
- Constance Dowling as Evelyn Green
- Steven Geray as Lloyd Harrison
- James Bell as Det. Lt. Fred Applegate
- William Forrest as Henry Small
