= Mystery in Mexico =

1948 film by Robert Wise

- Directed by: Robert Wise
- Screenplay by: Lawrence Kimble
- Story by: Muriel Roy Bolton
- Starring: William Lundigan; Jacqueline White; Ricardo Cortez
- Cinematography: Jack Draper
- Edited by: Samuel E. Beetley
- Music by: Paul Sawtell
- Production company: RKO Radio Pictures
- Distributed by: RKO Radio Pictures
- Release date: July 1, 1948 (U.S.)
- Running time: 65-66 minutes
- Country: United States
- Language: English

Mystery in Mexico is a 1948 American crime thriller film directed by Robert Wise. It stars William Lundigan, Jacqueline White and Ricardo Cortez. The film centers around the search for an insurance investigator who goes to Mexico in search of some valuable stolen jewelry. The film was shot on location in Mexico City and Cuernavaca.

== Plot ==
On a flight to Mexico City, insurance investigator Steve Hastings befriends singer Victoria Ames, attempting to get information about her missing brother, fellow investigator Glenn Ames, who the firm suspects may have taken a stolen necklace he was tasked with recovering. Their search for Glenn leads them to nightclub owner John Norcross and his sometimes girlfriend, singer Dolores Fernandez. Taxi driver Carlos, who has been helping Hastings, turns out to be Norcross's stooge, and reveals to the nightclub owner where the injured Glenn has been recuperating with a simple Mexican family.

== Cast ==
- William Lundigan as Steve Hastings
- Jacqueline White as Victoria Ames
- Ricardo Cortez as John Norcross
- Tony Barrett as Carlos
- Jacqueline Dalya as Dolores Fernandez
- Walter Reed as Glenn Ames
- Antonio R. Frausto as Señor Gomez
- Dolores Camarillo as Señora Gomez
- José Torvay as Swigart
- Jamie Jiménez Pons as Pancho
- Eduardo Casado as Police Commandant Rodriguez
- Thalia Draper as Florecita
- Armando Silvestre as Benny

== Production ==
Principal photography for Mystery in Mexico took place at RKO's Estudios Churubusco in Mexico City and their studios in Hollywood in late September and October, and early and mid-November 1947. Location shooting took place in Cuernavaca and other places in Mexico.
