= Air Raid Wardens =

1943 film by Edward Sedgwick

- Theatrical poster for Air Raid Wardens (1943)
- Directed by: Edward Sedgwick
- Written by: Martin Rackin; Harry Crane; Jack Jevne; Charley Rogers
- Produced by: B.F. Zeidman
- Starring: Stan Laurel; Oliver Hardy; Edgar Kennedy; Jacqueline White
- Cinematography: Walter Lundin
- Edited by: Irvine Warburton
- Music by: Nathaniel Shilkret
- Production company: Metro-Goldwyn-Mayer
- Distributed by: Loew's Inc.
- Release date: April 30, 1943
- Running time: 67 minutes
- Country: United States
- Language: English

Air Raid Wardens is a 1943 comedy film directed by Edward Sedgwick and starring Laurel and Hardy. It was the first of two feature films starring the duo for Metro-Goldwyn-Mayer.

== Plot ==
Set during World War II, Stan and Ollie face a series of misfortunes, depicted through a montage of failed business ventures. Their attempts to enlist in various armed forces branches meet with similar disappointment. Returning to their hometown of Huxton, they discover their bicycle shop has been commandeered by Eustace Middling, a purported businessman secretly engaged in espionage on behalf of Germany.

Assuming roles as air raid wardens, Stan and Ollie undergo training, yet encounter mishaps during a drill to rescue banker J.P. Norton, inadvertently burying him in sand. Assigned to ensure nighttime light compliance, they engage in a confrontation with troublesome resident Joe Bledsoe, leading to allegations of espionage at Joe's residence and their dismissal from duty.

Suspecting Middling's nefarious activities, Stan and Ollie trail him to a hideout, where they uncover a plot to sabotage the town's magnesium plant. Despite their efforts to alert authorities, they are captured by Middling's accomplices. Escaping, they alert civil defense forces in time to thwart the sabotage, ultimately exposing Middling's espionage activities.

== Cast ==
- Stan Laurel as Stan
- Oliver Hardy as Ollie
- Edgar Kennedy as Joe Bledsoe
- Jacqueline White as Peggy Parker
- Stephen McNally as Dan Madison (as Horace McNally)
- Nella Walker as Millicent Norton
- Donald Meek as Eustace Middling
- Henry O'Neill as Rittenhause
- Howard Freeman as J.P. Norton
- Paul Stanton as Capt. Biddle
- Robert Emmett O'Connor as Charlie Beaugart
- William Tannen as Joseph
- Russell Hicks as Maj. Scanlon
- Philip Van Zandt as Herman
- Frederic Worlock as Otto
- Charles Coleman as Norton's Butler
- Don Costello as Heydrich
- Daisy the dog (uncredited)

== Reception ==
Most trade reviewers considered this par for the course, a typical Laurel & Hardy comedy. "The full bag of Laurel and Hardy tricks is unloaded in Air Raid Wardens," reported Motion Picture Daily; "Their adventures in bungle, evolving in the capture of Nazi spies, are replete with the team's characteristic antics, and exhibitors have the Laurel and Hardy marquee value as a focal point in selling the film." Film Bulletin concurred: "Typical Laurel and Hardy horseplay which permits these comedians to pull most of their familiar tricks, Air Raid Wardens will get laughs from their numerous followers." "Every possible blunder known to man is committed by the boys," said Photoplay, adding that "Stan and Ollie are in rare form."Showmen's Trade Review noted that the studio's injection of pathos slowed the pace of the comedy: "Avid Laurel-Hardy fans will find it a fair-to-middlin' example of that team's comedy, but average audiences are more likely to find the proceedings on the dull side." In The New York Times, Ted Strauss wrote, "The pair still insist on traveling the longest distance between two points; the simplest acts such as pulling a rope or climbing a ladder become operations hardly less complicated than the invasion of Europe... Meanwhile, the folks in the Rialto pews are laughing their heads off." Motion Picture Reviews recommended the film as excellent juvenile entertainment: "Against a background of efficient civil defense, Laurel and Hardy epitomize all the pathos and comedy of incompetence, representing the misfits in the world who are long on good intentions but short on ability. It is slapstick fun which has high moments of hilarity and should delight the comedians' followers."
