= Heart of the Golden West =

1942 film by Joseph Kane

- Theatrical release poster
- Directed by: Joseph Kane
- Written by: Earl Felton
- Starring: Roy Rogers; Ruth Terry
- Music by: Sons of the Pioneers
- Distributed by: Republic Pictures
- Release date: 1942
- Running time: 65 minutes
- Country: United States
- Language: English

Heart of the Golden West is a 1942 American Western film starring Roy Rogers.

== Plot ==
Roy helps the ranchers of Cherokee City when Ross Lambert (McDonald) doubles the rates to ship their cattle to market. Roy contacts the owner of a steamboat, Colonel Silas Popen (Catlett) to see about shipping cattle by boat. Roy and the Sons of the Pioneers plan a warm western welcome for Popen and his daughter, Mary Lou (Terry). James Barabee (Paul Harvey), head of the Cattleman's Association, sends Roy a telegram saying that Popen hates everything western, but Lambert intercepts the telegram, so Roy makes a bad first impression. Lambert also stages a saloon brawl to terrify Popen; the noise scares the horses of Popen's wagon and causes a runaway. Roy saves Popen and Mary Lou, but Popen still refuses to ship cattle.

Mary Lou takes matters into her own hands and tells the ranchers to round up the cattle and bring them to Barabee's ranch. Lambert has some of his men set fire to the steamboat. While the ranch hands are out fighting the fire he rustles all the cattle. Popen has fallen into a well on the ranch and overhears Lambert discussing the crime with his men. When Popen is rescued he reveals that the cattle have been taken under a waterfall to a swamp. The ranchers retrieve the cattle and arrest Lambert and his men. Roy rescues Mary Lou, who has been kidnapped by Lambert. Popen signs a contract agreeing to transport the cattle.

== Cast ==
- Roy Rogers as Roy
- Smiley Burnette as Frog
- Ruth Terry as Mary Lou Popen
- Walter Catlett as Col. Silas Popen
- Edmund MacDonald as Ross Lambert
- George "Gabby" Hayes as Gabby
- Bob Nolan as Bob (leader of the Sons of the Pioneers)
