= Cast a Long Shadow =

1959 film

- Theatrical release poster
- Directed by: Thomas Carr
- Screenplay by: Martin Goldsmith (as Martin M. Goldsmith); John McGreevey
- Story by: Martin Goldsmith (as Martin M Goldsmith)
- Based on: novel by Wayne D. Overholser
- Produced by: Walter Mirisch (as Walter M. Mirisch)
- Starring: Audie Murphy; Terry Moore
- Cinematography: Wilfred M. Cline
- Music by: Gerald Fried
- Color process: Black and white
- Production company: Mirisch-Murphy Company
- Distributed by: United Artists
- Release date: September 1959
- Running time: 82 minutes
- Country: United States
- Language: English

Cast a Long Shadow is a 1959 American Western film directed by Thomas Carr and starring Audie Murphy and Terry Moore. The film was based on the 1957 novel by Wayne D. Overholser.

== Plot ==
Matt Brown is tracked down by Chip Donahue and told that he has inherited the cattle ranch where he grew up from its owner, a man who was suspected to be his father but who never claimed him as his son. He agrees to sell the ranch to the townspeople who work the ranch, who want the chance to work for themselves. When he returns to town, he visits the house and, after meeting an old girlfriend, decides not to sell, angering the people. However, he discovers that the ranch is deep in debt and about to be foreclosed on. To avoid this, he and the ranchhands have to drive the ranch's cattle to Santa Fe in three days to sell them for the money to pay off the debt. Some of the men from the town, unhappy at being fired by Matt, follow the cattle drive and conspire to kill him. Along the way, Matt discovers the truth about his past.

== Cast ==
- Audie Murphy as Matt Brown
- Terry Moore as Janet Calvert
- John Dehner as Chip Donahue
- James Best as Sam Muller
- Rita Lynn as Hortensia
- Denver Pyle as Harrison
- Ann Doran as Ma Calvert
- Stacy Harris as Brown (as Stacy S. Harris)
- Robert Foulk as Hugh Rigdon
- Wright King as Noah Pringle
- Rudy Sooter as Musician

== Production ==
It was one of the first films the Mirisch Brothers made after they left Allied Artists.

== See also ==
- List of American films of 1959
