= Calling All Marines =

1939 film by John H. Auer

- Theatrical release poster
- Directed by: John H. Auer
- Screenplay by: Earl Felton
- Story by: Harrison Carter
- Produced by: Armand Schaefer
- Starring: Don "Red" Barry; Helen Mack; Warren Hymer; Robert Kent; Cy Kendall; Leon Ames
- Cinematography: Ernest Miller
- Edited by: Ernest J. Nims
- Music by: William Lava
- Production company: Republic Pictures
- Distributed by: Republic Pictures
- Release date: September 20, 1939
- Running time: 67 minutes
- Country: United States
- Language: English

Calling All Marines is a 1939 American action film directed by John H. Auer and written by Earl Felton. The film stars Don "Red" Barry, Helen Mack, Warren Hymer, Robert Kent, Cy Kendall and Leon Ames. The film was released on September 20, 1939, by Republic Pictures.

== Plot ==
A mobster enlists in the Marines in order to help his gang leader steal secret military documents, but will his experience change his ways?

== Cast ==
- Don "Red" Barry as 'Blackie' Cross
- Helen Mack as Judy Fox
- Warren Hymer as Snooker
- Robert Kent as Sgt. Marvin Fox
- Cy Kendall as Big Joe Kelly
- Leon Ames as Murdock
- Selmer Jackson as Col. C.B. Vincent
- Janet McLeay as Pat
- Walter McGrail as Capt. Chester
- George Chandler as John Gordon
- Jay Novello as Lefty
- James Flavin as Sgt. Smith
- Joe Devlin as Dutch
- Thomas Carr as Young Marine
