= Wright King =

American actor

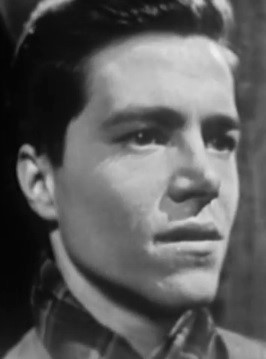
- Born: Wright Thornburgh King; January 11, 1923
- Died: November 25, 2018 (aged 95); Los Angeles, California, U.S.
- Occupation: Actor
- Years active: 1946–1987
- Spouse: June Ellen Roth King (m. 1948; died 2008)
- Children: 3

Wright Thornburgh King (January 11, 1923 – November 25, 2018) was an American stage, film and television actor whose career lasted for over forty years. He is best known for playing Jason Nichols in the television series Wanted Dead or Alive (1958–1961).

== Early life and career ==
King studied acting at the St Louis School of Theater, from which he graduated in 1941, before enlisting in the United States Navy during World War II, in which he served in the South Pacific campaign from 1943 to 1945.

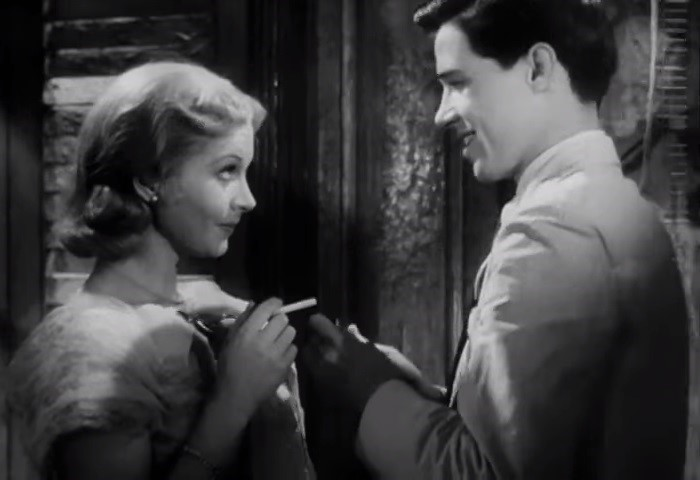
With Vivien Leigh in A Streetcar Named Desire (1951)

King made his small screen debut in 1949 as Midshipman Bascomb in the television series Captain Video and His Video Rangers.

Throughout his career, he worked in both the United States and in the United Kingdom.

King was cast in numerous Westerns and is particularly known for his role in the 1951 film adaptation of Tennessee Williams's A Streetcar Named Desire, starring Vivien Leigh (whom his character kisses). Prior to that, he had appeared in the original stage production, a performance which was lauded by drama critic Harold Hobson. In 1958 King appeared as the Kiowa Kid/Nevada Jones on the TV Western Cheyenne in the episode "Ghost of the Cimarron." In 1957 King starred as Joe Digger, a falsely accused horse thief who was hanged but saved, then hanged again after he killed one of his original executioners in the Gunsmoke episode "Born to Hang". King also appeared in eleven episodes of the television series Wanted Dead or Alive starring Steve McQueen, playing a young sidekick named Jason Nichols in nine of them. He also appeared in S2 E13 "No Trail Back" as Joe Hooker, the brother of a wanted man, who was bitten by a rabid dog. It aired 11/26/1959.

Other noteworthy film credits included roles in Cast a Long Shadow (1959), King Rat (1965), Planet of the Apes (1968), Finian's Rainbow (1968) and Invasion of the Bee Girls (1973).

In 1974, he played U.S. Senator Richard B. Russell Jr. of Georgia in the TV movie The Missiles of October, a dramatization of the Cuban Missile Crisis of 1962.

He appeared in the television series Johnny Jupiter, was in two episodes of the TV series The Silent Service (S01 E10 "The Pampanito" and S01 E20 "The Squailfish"). He appeared with Richard Boone in Have Gun – Will Travel in the episodes "Helen of Abajinan" and "A Knight to Remember". He also appeared with James Arness in Gunsmoke in the 1959 episode “False Witness” (S5Ep14), the 10/5/1961 Season 1 Episode 2 of "Hazel" entitled "Hazel Makes a Will" in which he played the part of Hazel's nephew lawyer, Leroy; in the 1961 episode "Colorado Sheriff" (S6E38), the 1964 episode “No Hands” (S9E19) and the 1965 episode "The Bounty Hunter" (S11E7).

== Personal life ==
King married June Ellen Roth in 1948. The couple had three sons, Wright Jr., Michael, and actor Meegan King.

He died in the Motion Picture & Television Fund retirement community in Woodland Hills, CA, on November 25, 2018, at the age of 95.

== Filmography ==
Year	Title	Role	Notes
1951	A Streetcar Named Desire	Newspaper Collector	
1956	The Bold and the Brave	Technician Fifth Grade	
1956	The Young Guns	Jonesy	
1956	Friendly Persuasion	Forager	Uncredited
1956	Stagecoach to Fury	Ralph Slader	
1957	Hot Rod Rumble	Ray Johnson - Arnie's sidekick	
1959	The Gunfight at Dodge City	Billy Townsend	
1959	Cast a Long Shadow	Noah Pringle	
1962	Dangerous Charter	Joe	Shot in 1958
1965	King Rat	Brough	
1968	Planet of the Apes	Dr. Galen	
1968	Finian's Rainbow	District Attorney	
1972	Journey Through Rosebud	Indian Agent	
1973	Invasion of the Bee Girls	Dr. Murger	
1987	House Made of Dawn	Father Olguin	(final film role)

== Selected television ==
Year	Title	Role	Notes
1949	Captain Video and His Video Rangers	Midshipman Bascomb	
1950-51	Big Town	Actor	2 episodes
1956	Cheyenne	Frank Endicott	Season 1/Episode 11 - "Quicksand"
1957	Cheyenne	Blaney Wilcox / Pocatello Kid	Season 2/Episode 15 - "Born Bad"
1957	Have Gun – Will Travel	Jimmy O'Riley	Season 1/Episode 16 - "Helen of Abajinian"
1957	State Trooper	Jamie Syckles	Season 2/Episode 29 - "The Widow Makers"
1958	Cheyenne	The Kiowa Kid / Nevada Jones	Season 3/Episode 14 - "Ghost of the Cimarron"
1959	Gunsmoke	Crep	Season 5/Episode 14 - "False Witness"
1959	Wanted: Dead or Alive	Seth Blake	Season 1/Episode 36 - "Amos Carter"
1959-1960	Wanted: Dead or Alive	Jason Nichols	Season 2 - 10 episodes
1961	Hazel	Leroy	Season 1/Episode 2 - "Hazel Makes a Will"
1962	Gunsmoke	Gant	Season 8/Episode 11 - “Abe Blocker”
1962-63	Perry Mason	Lee Gregson	2 episodes
1963	The Twilight Zone	Mr. Hecate	Season 4/Episode 14 - "Of Late I Think of Cliffordville"
1964	Voyage to the Bottom of the Sea	Dr. Baines	Season 1/Episode 10 - "Submarine Sunk Here"
1965-66	The F.B.I.	SAC Parker	2 episodes
1968	Judd, for the Defense	J.W. Roe	Season 2/Episode 6 - "The Death Farm"
1968	Mannix	Robert Hartigan	2 episodes
1969	The Outcasts	Fred Willard	Season 1/Episode 16 - "Act of Faith"
1969	Lancer	Zack Blake	Season 1/Episode 22 - "The Knot"
1970	The Andersonville Trial	Major Hosmer	PBS film version of 1959 Broadway play by Saul Levitt
1970	Dan August	Gordon Elliott	Season 1/Episode 12 - "Quadrangle for Death"
1973	The Streets of San Francisco	Les Slauson	Season 2/Episode 9 - "The Twenty-Four Karat Plague"
1973	Room 222	Mr. Sheldon	Season 4/Episode 23 - "To Go with the Bubbles"
1975	McCloud	Carter	Season 6/Episode 4 - "Three Guns for New York"
1976	How the West Was Won	Infantry Captain	Season 1, pilot episode - "The Macahans"
1977	Police Woman	Marston	Season 4/Episode 8 - "Death Game"
