= Samuel E. Beetley =

American film editor (1913–1988)

Samuel Edwin Beetley
- Born: November 23, 1913; Rockport, Texas, U.S.
- Died: September 15, 1988 (aged 74); Santa Cruz, California, U.S.
- Other names: Sam E. Beetley; Samuel Beetley
- Occupation: Film editor
- Years active: 1937–1984

Samuel Edwin Beetley (November 23, 1913 – September 15, 1988) was an American film editor. He received two Academy Award nominations for his works in The Longest Day (1962) and Doctor Dolittle (1967). Beetley also won two Primetime Emmy Awards from seven nominations.

== Selected filmography ==
Samuel E. Beetley began his career as an editor.

Based on Beetley's filmography at the Internet Movie Database, the director and release date of each film are indicated in parentheses.

With more than 30 film credits dating from 1937, his film editing work includes:

Editor
Year	Film	Director	Notes
1937	The Toast of New York	Rowland V. Lee	First collaboration with Rowland V. Lee
1942	Powder Town	Rowland V. Lee	Second collaboration with Rowland V. Lee
1942	Army Surgeon	A. Edward Sutherland	First collaboration with A. Edward Sutherland
1942	The Navy Comes Through	A. Edward Sutherland	Second collaboration with A. Edward Sutherland
1946	Sunset Pass	William Berke	
1946	Child of Divorce	Richard Fleischer	First collaboration with Richard Fleischer
1947	Beat the Band	John H. Auer	
1947	Out of the Past	Jacques Tourneur	
1948	Race Street	Edwin L. Marin	
1948	Return of the Bad Men	Ray Enright	
1948	Mystery in Mexico	Robert Wise	First collaboration with Robert Wise
1948	Blood on the Moon	Robert Wise	Second collaboration with Robert Wise
1949	Brothers in the Saddle	Lesley Selander	First collaboration with Lesley Selander
1949	The Clay Pigeon	Richard Fleischer	Second collaboration with Richard Fleischer
1949	The Big Steal	Don Siegel	
1949	The Threat	Felix E. Feist	
1950	The White Tower	Ted Tetzlaff	
1950	Hunt the Man Down	George Archainbaud	
1951	Overland Telegraph	Lesley Selander	Second collaboration with Lesley Selander
1952	At Sword's Point	Lewis Allen	
1952	Trail Guide	Lesley Selander	Third collaboration with Lesley Selander
1952	The Pace That Thrills	Leon Barsha	
1952	Macao	Josef von Sternberg	
1952	The Half-Breed	Stuart Gilmore	
1962	The Longest Day	Ken Annakin; Andrew Marton; Bernhard Wicki	First collaboration with Bernhard Wicki
1964	The Visit	Bernhard Wicki	Second collaboration with Bernhard Wicki
1965	Up from the Beach	Robert Parrish	
1965	The Agony and the Ecstasy	Carol Reed	
1967	Doctor Dolittle	Richard Fleischer	Third collaboration with Richard Fleischer
1973	Soylent Green	Richard Fleischer	Fourth collaboration with Richard Fleischer
1978	Five Days from Home	George Peppard	
1982	Safari 3000	Harry Hurwitz	

Documentaries

Editor
Year	Film	Director
1969	D-Day Revisited	Bernard Farrel

Shorts

Editor
Year	Film	Director
1948	Pal's Return	Leslie Goodwins

TV movies

Editor
Year	Film	Director
1973	The Blue Knight	Robert Butler
1974	The Stranger Within	Lee Philips
1974	Bad Ronald	Buzz Kulik
1976	Wanted: The Sundance Woman	Lee Philips
1976	Sherlock Holmes in New York	Boris Sagal
1978	Lassie: A New Beginning	Don Chaffey
1978	A Guide for the Married Woman	Hy Averback
1979	Jennifer: A Woman's Story	Guy Green
1980	Jimmy B. & André	Guy Green
1982	Mother's Day on Walton's Mountain	Gwen Arner

Production manager
Year	Film	Director	Role
1969	The Desperate Mission	Earl Bellamy	Post-production supervisor
1969	Daughter of the Mind	Walter Grauman	Post-production supervisor
1969	Honeymoon with a Stranger	John Peyser	Post-production supervisor
1970	Along Came a Spider	Lee H. Katzin	Post-production supervisor
1970	The Challenge	George McCowan	Post-production supervisor
1970	Tribes	Joseph Sargent	Post-production supervisor
1971	Paper Man	Walter Grauman	Post-production supervisor
1971	Mr. and Mrs. Bo Jo Jones	Robert Day	Post-production supervisor
1971	Dead Men Tell No Tales	Walter Grauman	Post-production supervisor
1971	They Call It Murder	Walter Grauman	Post-production supervisor
1972	Fireball Forward	Marvin J. Chomsky	Post-production supervisor
1973	Incident on a Dark Street	Buzz Kulik	Post-production supervisor

TV pilots

Editor
Year	Film	Director
1960	Full Speed for Anywhere	Don Taylor

TV series

Editor
Year	Title	Notes
1952	The Unexpected	2 episodes
1953	Boston Blackie	2 episodes
1953	The Cisco Kid	1 episode
1953	My Hero	4 episodes
1955	Stage 7	1 episode
1955−56	The Star and the Story	8 episodes
1952−56	Four Star Playhouse	94 episodes
1954−56	Cavalcade of America	6 episodes
1956	Chevron Hall of Stars	5 episodes
1957	Mr. Adams and Eve	2 episodes
1957−58	Goodyear Theatre	4 episodes
1957−58	Alcoa Theatre	6 episodes
1958	Colgate Theatre	1 episode
1958	Trackdown	1 episode
1956−58	Hey, Jeannie!	7 episodes
1956−59	Richard Diamond, Private Detective	3 episodes
1956−59	Zane Grey Theatre	22 episodes
1959	Black Saddle	2 episodes
1959	The David Niven Show	6 episodes
1959	Wichita Town	1 episode
1959−60	The DuPont Show with June Allyson	3 episodes
1960	The Detectives	1 episode
1960	Johnny Ringo	1 episode
1958−60	Wanted Dead or Alive	3 episodes
1958−60	The Rifleman	11 episodes
1961	The Law and Mr. Jones	1 episode
1961−63	The Dick Powell Show	7 episodes
1962−63	The Lloyd Bridges Show	2 episodes
1963	Burke's Law	1 episode
1974	Doc Elliot	2 episodes
1974−75	The Waltons	5 episodes
1975	The Blue Knight	1 episode
1975−76	Medical Story	2 episodes
1976	M*A*S*H	5 episodes
1983	At Ease	1 episode
1982−85	Matt Houston	11 episodes
2017	The Forsaken Westerns	1 episode

Editorial department
Year	Title	Role	Notes
1960−61	Wanted Dead or Alive	Editorial supervisor	22 episodes
1973	Mannix	Post-production coordinator	1 episode

Production manager
Year	Title	Role	Notes
1968−69	The Felony Squad	Post-production supervisor	17 episodes
1968−69	Judd, for the Defense	Post-production supervisor	24 episodes
1968−70	The Ghost & Mrs. Muir	Post-production supervisor	48 episodes
1968−70	Daniel Boone	Post-production supervisor	52 episodes
1968−70	Lancer	Post-production supervisor	15 episodes
1969−70	Bracken's World	Post-production supervisor	41 episodes
1968−71	Julia	Post-production supervisor	85 episodes
1970−71	Arnie	Post-production supervisor	25 episodes
1970−71	Nanny and the Professor	Post-production supervisor	54 episodes
1969−72	Room 222	Post-production supervisor	75 episodes
1971−72	Cade's County	Post-production supervisor	24 episodes
