= Detour (1945 film) =

1945 film directed by Edgar G. Ulmer

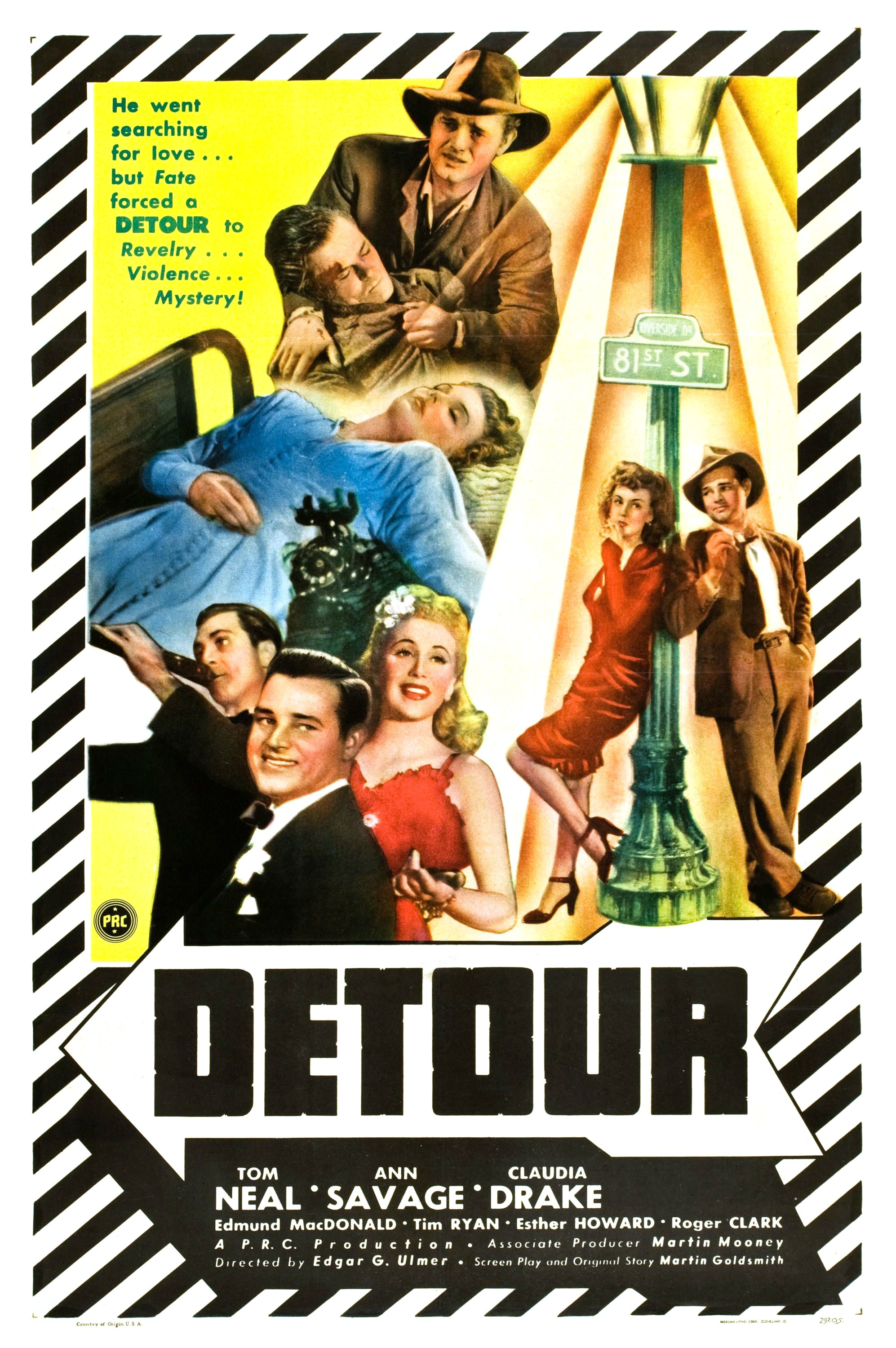
- Theatrical release poster
- Directed by: Edgar G. Ulmer
- Screenplay by: Martin Goldsmith
- Based on: Detour: An Extraordinary Tale; 1939 novel by Martin Goldsmith
- Produced by: Leon Fromkess
- Starring: Tom Neal; Ann Savage
- Narrated by: Tom Neal
- Cinematography: Benjamin H. Kline
- Edited by: George McGuire
- Music by: Leo Erdody
- Production company: Producers Releasing Corporation
- Distributed by: Producers Releasing Corporation
- Release dates: November 15, 1945 (Boston); November 30, 1945 (limited)
- Running time: 68 minutes
- Country: United States
- Language: English
- Budget: $20,000-$100,000
- Box office: $1 million

Detour is a 1945 American independent road film noir directed by Edgar G. Ulmer and starring Tom Neal and Ann Savage. The screenplay was adapted by Martin Goldsmith and an uncredited Martin Mooney from Goldsmith's 1939 novel of the same title, and released by the Producers Releasing Corporation, one of the so-called Poverty Row film studios in mid-20th-century Hollywood.

The film, which today is in the public domain and freely available for viewing at various online sources, was restored by the Academy Film Archive in 2018. In April that year, the 4K restoration premiered in Los Angeles at the TCM Festival. In 1992, Detour was selected for preservation in the United States National Film Registry by the Library of Congress as being "culturally, historically, or aesthetically significant".

== Plot ==
Al Roberts, an employed pianist, arrives at a roadside diner in Reno, Nevada after hitching a ride. He becomes upset at a customer for playing a song on the jukebox, as it reminds him of his time squandering his talent at a cheap nightclub in New York City. When his girlfriend and the nightclub's lead singer Sue Harvey quits her job and leaves to seek fame in Hollywood, Al becomes depressed. Eventually he decides to travel to California to marry her. Being nearly broke, he is forced to hitchhike across the country.

Detour full film; runtime 01:07:59

In Arizona, bookie Charles Haskell Jr. gives Al a ride in his convertible and informs him that he is also heading for Los Angeles. Later that night, Al is driving and a rainstorm forces him to pull over to put up the convertible's top. Unable to rouse Haskell from his sleep, he opens the passenger-side door and Haskell tumbles out, falling to the ground and striking his head on a rock. Al realizes that Haskell is dead.

While suspecting that Haskell could have died earlier from a heart attack, Al is convinced that if he calls the police, they will arrest him for murder. He hides the body in the roadside bush, takes the dead man's money, clothes, and identification, and drives away, intent on abandoning the car near Los Angeles.

Posing as Haskell, Al crosses into California and picks up a hitchhiker named Vera. During the drive, she suddenly challenges his story and ownership of the car, revealing that she had been picked up by Haskell earlier in Louisiana, but got out in Arizona after he tried to force himself on her. She blackmails Al by threatening to turn him over to the police, asks him to hand over the money he took from Haskell's wallet, and demands whatever they get from selling the car.

In Hollywood, the two rent an apartment as Mr. and Mrs. Haskell so as to provide a valid address for the sale. When Al is about to close the sale, Vera learns from a local newspaper that Haskell's wealthy father is near death and a search is under way for his long-estranged son. She now demands that Al impersonate Haskell and position himself to inherit the estate. Al refuses, arguing that the gambit would require detailed knowledge he lacks.

Back at the apartment, Al gets into an intense argument with a heavily inebriated Vera. In a drunken rage, she threatens to call the police and locks herself in the bedroom with the telephone. Al attempts to disconnect the phone by pulling on the cord. When he breaks down the bedroom door, he discovers that the cord was tangling around Vera's neck and he has inadvertently strangled her to death.

A resigned Al gives up the idea of contacting Sue again and hitchhikes out of Los Angeles. He later finds out that Haskell is wanted in connection with the murder of "his wife." Back in the diner in Reno, he silently walks out the door and down the highway, contemplating the eventuality that he will be arrested. A police car picks him up moments later, and they drive off.

== Cast ==
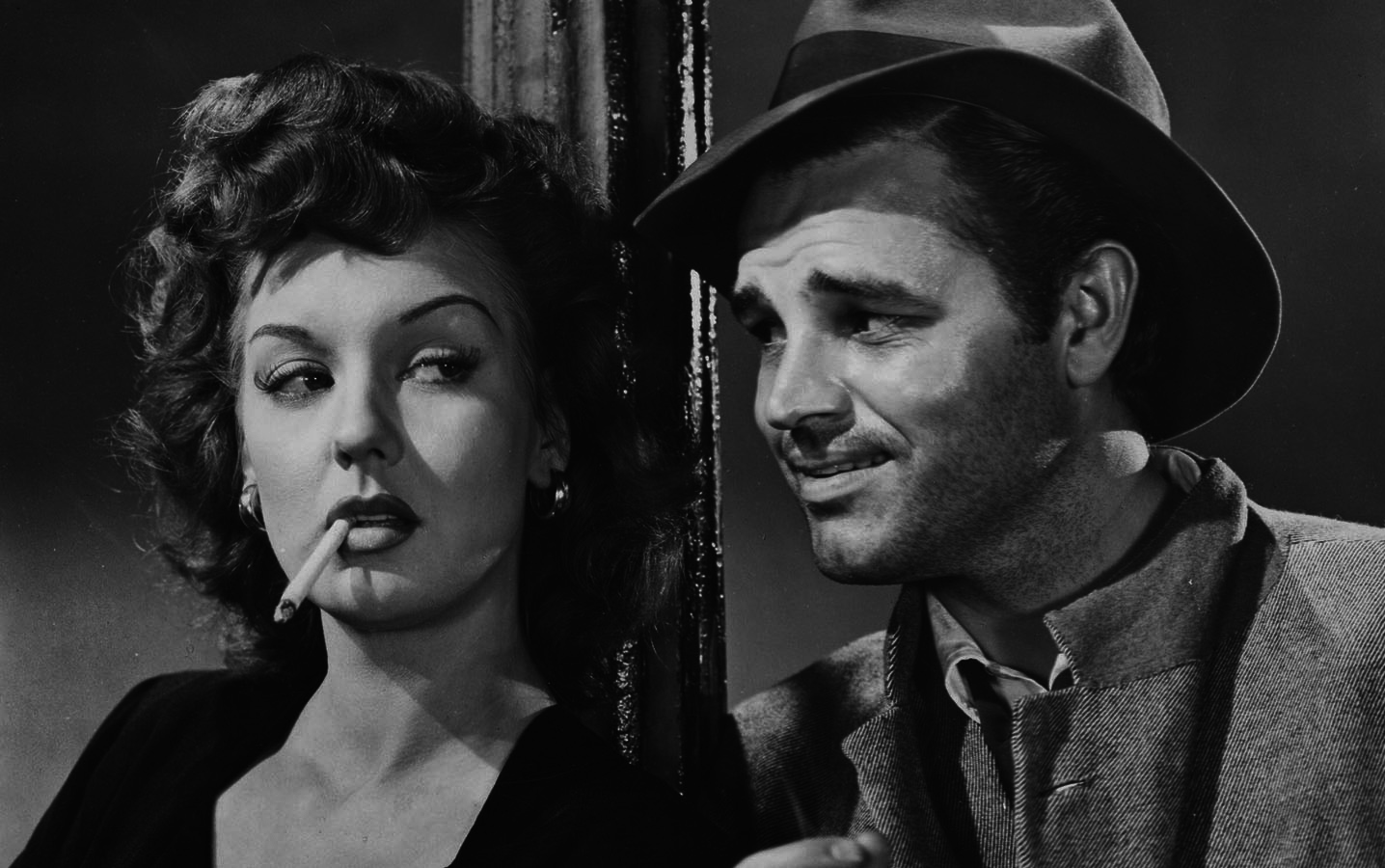
Ann Savage and Tom Neal

- Tom Neal as Al Roberts
- Ann Savage as Vera
- Claudia Drake as Sue Harvey
- Edmund MacDonald as Charles Haskell Jr.
- Tim Ryan as the Nevada diner proprietor
- Esther Howard as Holly, the diner waitress
- Pat Gleason as Joe, the truck driver
- Roger Clark as Dillon, a cop (uncredited)
- Don Brodie as the used car salesman (uncredited)
- Eddie Hall as the used car mechanic (uncredited)
- Harry Strang as the California Border Patrolman (uncredited)

Erdody's hands appear in closeups as Al Roberts plays the piano.

== Production ==
In 1972, Ulmer said in an interview that the film was shot in six days. However, in a 2004 documentary, Ulmer's daughter Arianne presented a shooting script title page which noted, "June 14, 1945-June 29. Camera days 14." Moreover, Ann Savage was contracted to Producers Releasing Corporation (PRC) for the production of Detour for three six-day weeks, and she later said the film was shot in four six-day weeks, with an additional four days of location work in the desert at Lancaster, California.

While popular belief long held that Detour was shot for about $20,000, Noah Isenberg, in conducting research for his book on the film, discovered that the production's final cost was closer to $100,000. Even so, it still had one of the highest profit margins, if not the highest, of any film noir listed in the National Film Registry.

Billy Halop was tested for the role of Al Roberts, was selected for the part, but was replaced by Tom Neal just three days before filming began.

=== Editing ===
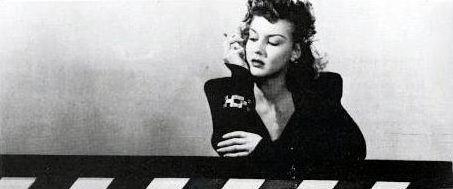
Savage in publicity still for the film

As detailed in Savage Detours: The Life and Work of Ann Savage, great care was taken during the postproduction of Detour. The final picture was tightly cut down from a much longer shooting script, which had been shot with more extended dialogue sequences that are not in the released print. The soundtrack is also fully realized, with ambient backgrounds, motivated sound effects, and a carefully scored original musical soundtrack by Leo Erdody, who had previously worked with Ulmer on Strange Illusion (1945). Erdody took extra pains to underscore Vera's introduction with a sympathetic theme, giving the character a light musical shading in contrast to her razor-sharp dialogue and its ferocious delivery by Savage.

The film was completed, negative cut, and printed throughout the late summer and fall of 1945, and was released in November of that year. The total period of preproduction through postproduction at PRC ran from March through November 1945.

In contrast, during the period Detour was in post-production, PRC shot, posted, and released Apology for Murder (1945), also starring Savage. Apology was given a shorter production period and a quick sound job, and used library music for the soundtrack. Clearly, Detour was a higher priority to PRC, and the release was well promoted in theaters with a full array of color print support, including six-sheet posters, standees, hand drawn portraits of the actors, and a jukebox tie-in record with Bing Crosby singing "I Can't Believe That You're in Love with Me" (1926).

With reshoots out of the question for such a low-budget movie, director Ulmer put storytelling above continuity. For example, he flipped the negative for some of the hitchhiking scenes. This showed the westbound New York City to Los Angeles travel of the character with a right-to-left flow across the screen, though it also made cars seem to be driving on the "wrong" side of the road, with the hitchhiker getting into the car on the driver's side.

=== Charlie Haskell's car ===
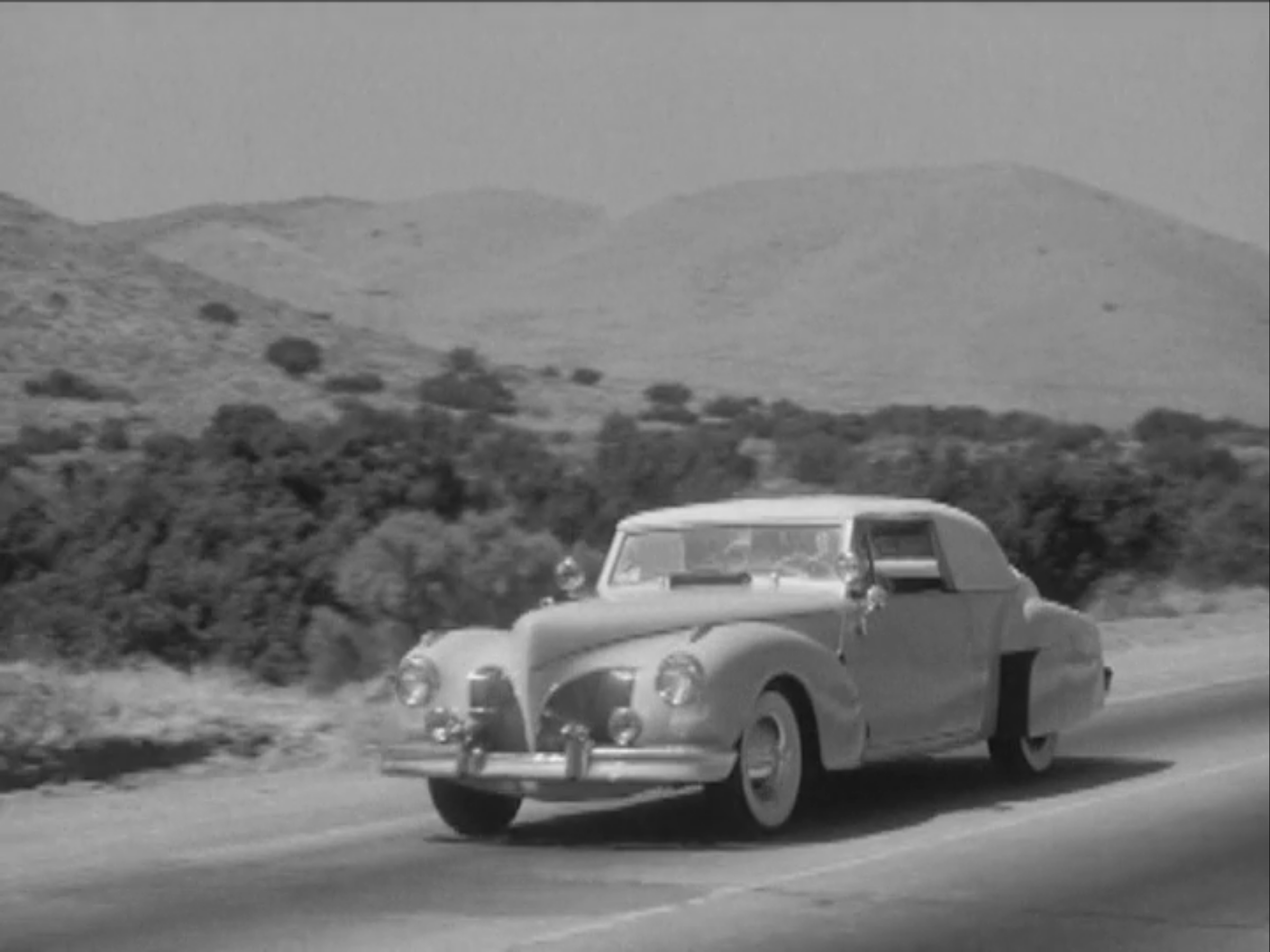
The 1941 Lincoln Continental driven by Haskell and Roberts

The car owned by the character Charlie Haskell and later driven by Al Roberts is a customized 1941 Lincoln Continental V-12 convertible, a base model of a "Cabriolet" but one that features bolted-on rear fender skirts and some exterior components added later from Lincoln's limited 1942 version of the same model. Reportedly, the production budget for Detour was so tight that director Ulmer decided to use this car, his "personal car", for the cross-country crime drama.

=== Censorship ===
The Motion Picture Production Code did not allow murderers to get away with their crimes, so Ulmer satisfied the censors by having Al picked up by a police car at the very end of the film after foreseeing his arrest in the earlier narration.

== Reception and legacy ==
Reissue trailer of Detour; runtime: 01:32

Detour was generally well received on its initial release, with positive reviews in the Los Angeles Times, The Hollywood Reporter, Variety, and other major newspapers and trade publications. Contemporary screenings of Detour were also not confined to grindhouse theaters; they were presented at top "movie houses". For example, in downtown Los Angeles in May 1946, it played at the 2,200-seat Orpheum in combination with a live stage show featuring the hit Slim Gaillard Trio and the Buddy Rich Orchestra. Business was reported to be excellent, despite a transit strike.

Shortly after the film's release in November 1945, Mandel Herbstman, the reviewer for the trade journal Motion Picture Herald, rated the production as only "fair". Herbstman was impressed, however, with the film's overall structure. "Venturing far from the familiar melodramatic pattern", he wrote, "director Edgar G. Ulmer has turned out an adroit, albeit unpretentious production about a man who stumbles into a series of circumstances which seals his doom." He especially liked its conclusion and noted, "Making no compromise with the 'happy ending' formula, the film has a number of ironic and suspenseful moments."

The film was released to television in the early 1950s, and it was broadcast in syndicated TV markets until the advent of mass cable systems. TV reviewers casually recommended it in the 1960s and 1970s as a worthwhile "B" movie. Then, by the 1980s, critics began citing Detour increasingly as a prime example of film noir, and revival houses, universities and film festivals began presenting the crime drama in tributes to Edgar G. Ulmer and his work. The director died in 1972, unfortunately before the full revival of Detour and the critical re-evaluation of his career occurred. Tom Neal died the same year as Ulmer, but Ann Savage lived long enough to experience the newfound acclaim. From 1985 until just two years before her death in 2008, she made a series of live appearances at public screenings of the film.

Critical response to the film decades after its release is almost universally positive. More current reviewers contrast the technical shoddiness of the film with its successful atmospherics as film critic Roger Ebert wrote in his essay for The Great Movies, "This movie from Hollywood's poverty row, shot in six days, filled with technical errors and ham-handed narrative, starring a man who can only pout and a woman who can only sneer, should have faded from sight soon after it was released in 1945. And yet it lives on, haunting and creepy, an embodiment of the guilty soul of film noir. No one who has seen it has easily forgotten it." Sight and Sound reviewer Philip Kemp later wrote, "Using unknown actors and filming with no more than three minimal sets, a sole exterior (a used-car lot) to represent Los Angeles, a few stock shots and some shaky back-projection, Ulmer conjures up a black, paranoid vision, totally untainted by glamour, of shabby characters trapped in a spiral of irrational guilt." Novelists Edward Gorman and Dow Mossman wrote, "Detour remains a masterpiece of its kind. There have been hundreds of better movies, but none with the feel for doom portrayed by ... Ulmer. The random universe Stephen Crane warned us about—the berserk cosmic impulse that causes earthquakes and famine and AIDS—is nowhere better depicted than in the scene where Tom Neal stands by the roadside, soaking in the midnight rain, feeling for the first time the noose drawing tighter and tighter around his neck."

In 2007, Richard Corliss, the former editor-in-chief of Film Comment and a notable film critic for Time magazine, ranked Savage's portrayal of Vera number 6 on his list of the "Top 25 Greatest Villains" in cinema history, placing her just behind Barbara Stanwyck's character Phyllis Dietrichson in Double Indemnity (1944). As part of his assessment of Vera, Corliss describes her effects on not only her traveling companion Al Roberts but on viewers of the film as well:

... Hell truly is other people—if the person is Vera. Picked up on a trip out west by a man (Tom Neal) fleeing from a death scene, she instantly and spectacularly gets on his and the audience's nerves. When she's not playing the domestic harridan ("Stop makin’ noises like a husband"), she's threatening to send him to the gas chamber ("sniffin' that perfume Arizona hands out free to murderers"). With a final fatal phone call, Vera leads her poor prey to his motel-room doom. Even in death, she makes the survivor the sucker.

Eddie Muller listed it as one of his Top 25 Noir Films: "Incredibly, it still casts its fetid, doom-laden spell, every time."

On the review aggregator website Rotten Tomatoes, 98% of 42 critics' reviews are positive. The website's consensus reads: "Stylish and gripping, Detour offers further proof that a patsy and a femme fatale often add up to a satisfying story."

== Remake ==
A remake of Detour was produced in 1992, starring Neal's son, Tom Neal Jr., and Lea Lavish, along with Susanna Foster making her first acting appearance in 43 years and her final appearance on film. Produced, written, and directed by Wade Williams and released by his distribution company, Englewood Entertainment, it was released on VHS and in 1998 on DVD.

== See also ==
- List of cult films
- List of films in the public domain in the United States
