= Earl Felton =

American screenwriter

- Born: October 16, 1909; Sandusky, Ohio, United States
- Died: May 2, 1972 (aged 62); Studio City, California; United States
- Occupation: Screenwriter
- Years active: 1936–1959 (film)

Earl Felton (1909–1972) was an American screenwriter.

He was a regular collaborator with Richard Fleischer, who later wrote that "Earl was crippled from childhood with polio. He had no use of his legs, but he navigated beautifully with a crutch and cane... Earl normally hated anybody [helping]... him and would sometimes lay about him with his cane."

Fleischer added that "in spite of his lifeless legs and total reliance of a crutch and cane to get around, Felton was much given to self-indulgences and debaucheries."

Felton allegedly worked for the CIA and was involved in the Profumo Affair

== Career ==
He sold the story Freshman Love to Warner Bros B movie unit. He also sold the story Man Hunt.

His story The Wizard of St Germaine was sold but not made.

His story The Bengal Killer was filmed as The Bengal Tiger.

In August 1937 he was reported working on a script Half Way House for MGM.

World Premiere (1941) was based on an original scenario by Felton.

In 1942 he wrote Heart of the Golden West for Roy Rogers.

In 1944 he sold A Likely Story to MGM. He wrote Pardon My Past for Fred MacMurray.

In 1947 he sold a novelette of his, Another Dawn, to Republic. It became Drums Along the Amazon.

He sold The Odyssey of Eddie Arcaro to MGM as a vehicle for Robert Taylor. He wrote the original story for The Beautiful Blonde from Bashful Bend.

=== Richard Fleischer ===
Felton began working with Richard Fleischer on Trapped. They went on to collaborate on Armored Car Robbery, His Kind of Woman, and Target which became The Narrow Margin.

He sold an original to Columbia, Feather in the Breeze.

Fleischer took Felton with him when they left RKO to work on The Happy Time. After The Happy Time he was to write and produce The Right Size of Me for Fleischer about the Doss family but it was not made. They were also meant to make Full of Life for Stanley Kramer but it was never filmed.

They did collaborate on 20,000 Leagues Under the Sea (1954) for Disney and Bandido for Robert Mitchum.

He wrote The Catwalk for MGM, Line of Fire for John Champion, The Lawless Decade for David L. Wolper and The Proving Flight for Fleischer.

Kramer used him on The Pride and the Passion (1957). The producer got him to do a draft of Inherit the Wind.

In 1960 Fleischer was going to direct a musical script by Felton, Willing is My Love starring Joni James. He did another for Fleischer, One Minute to Midnight. He wrote a film about LSD, East of the Moon. He wrote We Sing Tomorrow for Mort Sahl. None of these films were made.

In the mid-1960s he produced The Man from UNCLE.

In 1969 he wrote Brutes in Brass for GMF but it was not made.

== Selected filmography ==
- Freshman Love (1936) – screenplay
- Man Hunt (1936) – story
- Bengal Tiger (1936) – story and screenplay
- The Captain's Kid (1936) – story
- Bad Guy (1937) – screenplay
- Extortion (1938) - screenplay
- Prison Nurse (1938) – screenplay
- The Night Hawk (1938) – screenplay
- Orphans of the Street (1938) – story
- Society Smugglers (1939) – screenplay
- Smuggled Cargo (1939) – additional dialogue
- Calling All Marines (1939) – screenplay
- The Lone Wolf Keeps a Date (1940) – story, screenplay
- The Lone Wolf Takes a Chance – story, screenplay
- World Premiere (1941) – story, screenplay
- The Pittsburgh Kid (1941) – screenplay
- Sierra Sue (1942) – screenplay
- Sunset Serenade (1942) – screenplay
- Heart of the Golden West (1942) – screenplay
- My Best Gal (1944) – screenplay
- Pardon My Past (1945) – screenplay
- Criminal Court (1946) – story
- Drums Along the Amazon (1948) – story
- The Beautiful Blonde from Bashful Bend (1949) – story, screenplay
- Trapped (1949) – story
- Armoured Car Robbery (1950) – screenplay
- His Kind of Woman (1951) – uncredited contribution to script
- The Las Vegas Story (1952) – screenplay
- The Narrow Margin (1952) – screenplay
- The Happy Time (1952) – screenplay, associate producer – nominated Best Comedy 1953 Screen Writers Guild
- 20,000 Leagues Under the Sea (1954) – screenplay
- The Marauders (1955) – screenplay
- The Rawhide Years (1956) – screenplay
- Bandido! (1956) – story, screenplay
- The Pride and the Passion (1958) – uncredited contribution to script
- Killers of Kilimanjaro (1959) – screenplay
- The Felony Squad (1967) – "No Sad Songs for Charlie"

== Bibliography ==
- Shelley, Peter. Frances Farmer: The Life and Films of a Troubled Star. McFarland, 2010.
