= The Narrow Margin =

1952 film by Richard Fleischer

- Theatrical release poster
- Directed by: Richard Fleischer
- Screenplay by: Earl Felton
- Story by: Martin Goldsmith; Jack Leonard
- Produced by: Stanley Rubin
- Starring: Charles McGraw; Marie Windsor; Jacqueline White
- Cinematography: George E. Diskant
- Edited by: Robert Swink
- Production company: RKO Radio Pictures
- Distributed by: RKO Radio Pictures
- Release dates: April 23, 1952 (Cincinnati, premiere); May 2, 1952 (Los Angeles)
- Running time: 71 minutes
- Country: United States
- Language: English
- Budget: $230,000

The Narrow Margin is a 1952 American thriller film noir directed by Richard Fleischer and starring Charles McGraw, Marie Windsor and Jacqueline White. The film follows a police detective (McGraw) who is assigned to protect an important witness (Windsor) on a cross-country train.

The film was released by RKO Pictures on May 2, 1952. It was both a critical and commercial success, and was nominated for Best Story at the 25th Academy Awards. A remake, Narrow Margin, was released in 1990.

== Plot ==
Detective Sergeant Walter Brown of the LAPD and his partner, Sergeant Gus Forbes, are assigned to protect Frankie Neall, a mob boss's widow, as she rides a train from Chicago to Los Angeles to testify before a grand jury. She also carries a payoff list that belonged to her murdered husband. The mob is desperate to intercept that list.

As the detectives and Mrs. Neall leave her apartment, they are waylaid by Densel, a mob assassin. Forbes is shot to death, and Densel, possibly winged by Brown, escapes. At the train station, Brown discovers that he has been followed by a gangster. Each man knows the other is a mortal enemy. With the help of a conductor the man, Joseph Kemp, comes into Brown's room under the pretense that he is looking for lost luggage.

Kemp tries to open the door to the next compartment, where Mrs. Neall hides, but Brown tells the conductor that the room is empty, and Kemp and the conductor leave. Brown knows that Kemp will come back to search the room, so he hides Neall and her luggage in the ladies room and goes to the dining car so Kemp will know that the room is unguarded. Kemp searches both rooms, finding nothing. Later, mobster Vincent Yost engages Brown and unsuccessfully tries to bribe him into pointing out Neall and abandoning her, appealing to both his greed and his fear. Brown tells Yost he is under arrest for bribery, but Yost just shrugs it off as Brown is out of his jurisdiction. Yost even suggests that Brown could use the bribe to help the family of his murdered partner.

By chance, Brown befriends passenger Ann Sinclair and her young son Tommy. When Kemp spots Brown with her, he concludes she is Neall. After Brown beats him up in a fight and questions him, he turns Kemp over to railroad agent Sam Jennings and hurries to warn Ann of what he believes to be a case of mistaken identity. Densel, however, has boarded the train during a stop at La Junta, Colorado, and waylays Jennings, freeing Kemp.

Brown tries to explain to Ann that mobsters on the train mistakenly believe she is Neall and plan to kill her. However, she stuns him by revealing that she is the real widow. The woman he has been protecting is undercover Chicago policewoman Sarah Meggs, both a decoy and a test of Brown's devotion to his job. Ann has no payoff list, as she'd already mailed it to the Los Angeles District Attorney. Meanwhile, Densel and Kemp search Brown's compartment for the list and discover the fake Neall in her adjoining unit. As she tries to sneak her gun out of her purse Densel shoots her dead. Kemp then discovers a badge and police identification.

Densel immediately goes for Ann. When her door is locked, he knocks on the adjoining compartment's. Tommy opens and Densel grabs him. Densel knocks on the shared door to Ann's room and threatens to kill Tommy if she does not open it. She complies, and Densel locks himself in with her and demands the payoff list. Brown and Jennings arrive in the adjoining compartment. Brown uses the reflection from the window of a train on the next track to see into Ann's, and when he has a clear shot fires through the door, hitting Densel, who is finished off. Kemp jumps off the train and heads for accomplices in a trailing car, but they are all quickly arrested.

The train arrives in Los Angeles, and Brown escorts Ann from the station toward an awaiting police car. Rather than sneak out under cover, she takes a stand and chooses to walk the two blocks straight to the grand jury. The pair marches to the courthouse arm-in-arm.

== Cast ==
- Charles McGraw as Det. Sgt. Walter Brown
- Marie Windsor as Frankie Neall
- Jacqueline White as Ann Sinclair
- Peter Virgo as Densel
- Gordon Gebert as Tommy Sinclair
- Queenie Leonard as Mrs. Troll
- David Clarke as Joseph Kemp
- Don Beddoe as Det. Sgt. Gus Forbes
- Paul Maxey as Sam Jennings
- Peter Brocco as Vincent Yost

== Production ==
The screenplay was written by Earl Felton based on an unpublished story by Martin Goldsmith and Jack Leonard titled "Target". RKO Radio Pictures acquired the screen rights to the story in 1950. Principal photography lasted from May 27 to mid-June 1950.

Cinematographer George E. Diskant employed a handheld camera extensively to film within confined sets without having to remove walls, an innovative practice at the time.

The film's train follows a similar route to that of the real-life Super Chief, bur the film contains stock footage rather than depicting the actual train. Scenes set at Dearborn Station in Chicago were filmed at Union Station in Los Angeles. Scenes aboard the train were shot on a soundstage at RKO Studios, using rear projection for backgrounds seen through train windows.

According to Richard Fleischer, RKO owner Howard Hughes considered reshooting most of the film with Robert Mitchum and Jane Russell to release it as an A feature. Consequently, the film's release was delayed for two years. William Cameron Menzies filmed several additional scenes.

While a few instances of diegetic music can be heard in the film, it is notable for the absence of a traditional score.

== Release ==
After being shelved for two years, The Narrow Margin premiered in Cincinnati, Ohio on April 23, 1952. It opened in Los Angeles on May 2, and in New York City the following day.

== Reception ==
=== Critical response ===
In a contemporary review for The New York Times, critic Howard Thompson called the film "a trim, sizzling little humdinger" and wrote:

Using a small cast of comparative unknowns ... this inexpensive Stanley Rubin production for R. K. O. is almost a model of electric tension that, at least technically, nudges some of the screen's thriller milestones. Crisply performed and written and directed by Earl Felton and Richard Fleischer with tingling economy, this unpretentious offering should glue anyone to the edge of his seat and prove, once and for all, that a little can be made to count for a lot. ... By staging the incidents in a simple, chilling crescendo and by substituting an eagle camera eye for the usual musical background, Mr. Fleischer has projected a superbly menacing frame for the action. And just before the taut, ingenious finale, Earl Felton flapjacks the plot so cunningly that to elaborate here would be to ruin an ingratiating swindle.

In the New York Daily News, critic Kate Cameron wrote: "Every once in a while a picture comes along unheralded by its Hollywood producer and turns out to be just the one we've been waiting for. Such a picture is called a sleeper and that aptly describes the RKO melodrama 'The Narrow Margin' ... It runs its swift melodramatic course in 72 minutes, every one of which is packed with action and suspense."

=== Awards ===
Event	Category	Nominee(s)	Result	Ref.
25th Academy Awards	Best Motion Picture Story	Martin Goldsmith, Jack Leonard	Nominated	

== Remake ==
The film was remade in 1990 as Narrow Margin, directed by Peter Hyams and starring Anne Archer and Gene Hackman.

== See also ==
- List of cult films
