= Martin Goldsmith (screenwriter) =

American screenwriter and novelist

Martin M. Goldsmith (November 6, 1913 – May 24, 1994) was an American screenwriter and novelist who wrote several classic B-movies including Detour (1945), which he adapted from his 1939 novel of the same name; Blind Spot (1947); and The Narrow Margin (1952), for which he earned an Academy Award nomination.

Goldsmith, at one time the brother-in-law of actor Anthony Quinn, also contributed some stories to The Twilight Zone in 1964.

== Novels ==
- Double Jeopardy (1938)
- Detour (1939)
- Shadows at Noon (1943)

== Screenplays ==
- Dangerous Intruder (1945)
- Detour (1945)
- The Lone Wolf in Mexico (1947)
- Blind Spot (1947)
- Shakedown (1950)
- The Narrow Margin (1952)
- Mission Over Korea (1953)
- Overland Pacific (1954)
- Hell's Island (1955)
- Fort Massacre (1958)
- The Gunfight at Dodge City (1959)
- Cast a Long Shadow (1959)
