= Detour (Goldsmith novel) =

1939 novel by Martin M. Goldsmith

- Author: Martin M. Goldsmith
- Language: English
- Genre: Crime novel
- Published: 1939
- Publisher: The Macauley Co.
- Publication place: United States
- Media type: Print (clothbound hardcover)
- Pages: 248

Detour is a 1939 novel by Martin M. Goldsmith. The author adapted his novel into the noted 1945 film noir of the same name.

The book, subtitled An Extraordinary Tale, was published by the Macaulay Company. Its plot is similar to the movie to which it was later adapted, except that the main character's name was changed from "Alexander Roth" to "Al Roberts," the narrative alternates between the perspective of Roth and Sue Harvey, and erotic passages were removed.

The novel ends with much the same fatalistic line used in the movie: "God or Fate or some mysterious force can put the finger on you or on me for no good reason at all." In the film version of the novel, the reference to God is removed.

== Reception ==
The film Detour has achieved considerable acclaim as a defining movie of the film noir era, despite its low budget. However, the novel, long out of print, did not have the same fate.

A 2019 review in The Daily Beast argued that the original novel was even better than the movie which came after it.
