= Stanley Rubin =

American film producer (1917–2014)

Stanley Creamer Rubin (October 8, 1917 – March 2, 2014) was an American screenwriter and film and television producer born in New York City. He was the recipient of the Television Academy's first Emmy in 1949 for writing and producing (in collaboration) an adaptation of Guy de Maupassant's "The Necklace" for the NBC TV series Your Show Time.

== Career ==
His initial scripts for the big screen were for three 1940 films: South to Karanga, Diamond Frontier, and San Francisco Docks, all written in collaboration with Edmund L. Hartmann. He wrote, in collaboration with Bernard C. Schoenfeld, the film-noir adventure Macao (1952), starring Robert Mitchum and Jane Russell.

Rubin was a producer for 20th Century Fox before moving to Universal Pictures in 1953. Rubin's feature film producing credits include The Narrow Margin (1952), River of No Return (1954) starring Marilyn Monroe, the comedy Oh Dad, Poor Dad, Mamma's Hung You in the Closet and I'm Feelin' So Sad (1967) starring Rosalind Russell, and the Clint Eastwood adventure drama White Hunter Black Heart (1990). His television producing credits include the series The Ghost & Mrs. Muir (1968–1970) with Hope Lange and The Man and the City (1971–1972) with Anthony Quinn. For the former, he received an Emmy nomination as the producer of the Best Comedy Series. He received an additional Emmy nomination for producing the made-for-TV movie Babe (1975), starring Susan Clark as American athlete Babe Didrikson Zaharias.

== Personal life and death ==
Rubin attended UCLA from 1933 to 1937 as a political science major, where he also served as editor in chief of the Daily Bruin newspaper. He forwent completing the 14 units left for his degree for a stint at The Beverly Hills Citizen.

During World War II he enlisted in the United States Army Air Forces where he served in the First Motion Picture Unit. He was posted to Saipan to document the first B-29 mission to bomb Tokyo.

After his retirement from the entertainment industry, he returned to finish those units and received a degree from the UCLA Department of Theater in 2006.

Rubin was married to actress Kathleen Hughes from 1954 until his death. They had four children. He is the subject of the documentary film Stanley Rubin: A Work in Progress (2008), written and directed by Kellett Tighe.

He died on March 2, 2014, from natural causes at the age of 96 at his Los Angeles home.
