= Una O'Connor (actress) =

Irish-American actress (1880–1959)

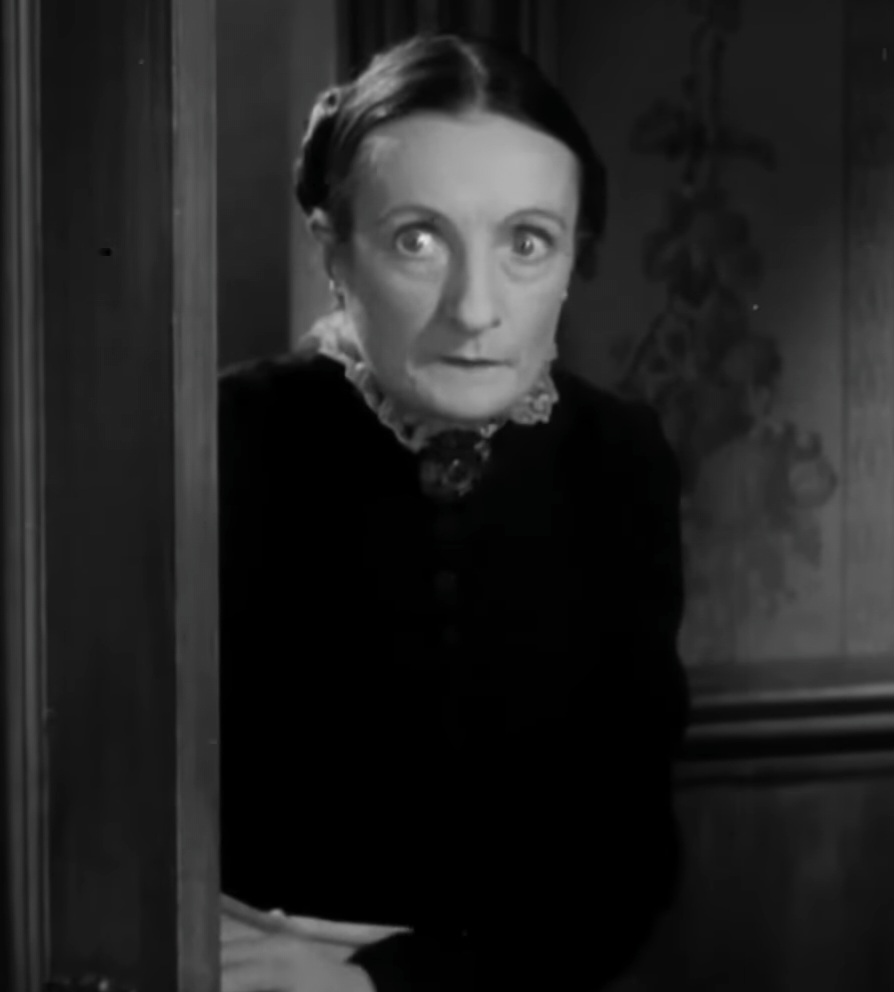
- O'Connor in Little Lord Fauntleroy (1936)
- Born: Agnes Teresa McGlade; 23 October 1880; Belfast, Ireland
- Died: 4 February 1959 (aged 78); New York City, U.S.
- Resting place: Calvary Cemetery (Queens, New York)
- Occupation: Actor
- Years active: 1911–1957

Una O'Connor (born Agnes Teresa McGlade; 23 October 1880 – 4 February 1959) was an Irish-born American actor who worked extensively in theatre before becoming a actress in film and in television. She often portrayed comical wives, housekeepers and servants. In 2020, she was listed at number 19 on The Irish Times list of Ireland's greatest film actors.

== Life and work ==
O'Connor was born to a Catholic nationalist family at 14 Alexander Street West in Belfast, Ireland. She was the daughter of James McGlade, a publican, and the former Maria Murphy. Her mother died when she was two; her father was a landowner/ farmer, ensuring that the family always had income from family land. He soon left for Australia and McGlade was brought up by an aunt, studying at St Dominic's School, Belfast, convent schools and in Paris. Thinking she would pursue teaching, she enrolled in the South Kensington School of Art.

Before taking up teaching duties, she enrolled in the Abbey School of Acting (affiliated with Dublin's Abbey Theatre). During her career with the Abbey, which lasted from 1912 until 1934, she performed in many productions; these are listed in the Abbey Theatre Archives. She changed her name when she began her acting career with the Abbey Theatre. One of her earliest appearances was in George Bernard Shaw's The Shewing-Up of Blanco Posnet in which she played the part of a swaggering American ranch girl. The production played in Dublin as well as in New York, opening 20 November 1911 at the Maxine Elliott Theatre, marking O'Connor's American debut.

By 1913, she was based in London, where she appeared in The Magic Jug, The Starlight Express (1915–16 at the Kingsway Theatre), and Paddy the Next Best Thing. In the early 1920s, she appeared as a cockney maid in Plus Fours followed in 1924 by her portrayal of a cockney waitress in Frederick Lonsdale's The Fake. In a single paragraph review, an unnamed reviewer noted "Una O'Connor's low comedy hotel maid was effectively handled." The latter show also played in New York (with O'Connor in the cast), opening 6 October 1924 at the Hudson Theatre. A review of the New York performances of The Fake recounts details of the plot, but then mentions

two players of more than ordinary excellence. In the third act of The Fake occurs a scene between Una O'Connor and Godfrey Tearle, with Miss O'Connor as a waitress trying a crude sort of flirtation with Mr. Tearle. He does not respond at all and the longing, the pathos of this servant girl when she has exhausted her charms and receives no encouragement, is the very epitome of what careful character portrayal should be. Miss O'Connor is on the stage for only this single act, but in that short space of time she registers an indelible impression. Rightly, she scored one of the best hits of the performance.

These two plays in which she portrayed servants and waitresses appear to have portended her future career. Returning to London, she played in The Ring o' Bells (November 1925), Autumn Fire (March 1926), Distinguished Villa (May 1926), and Quicksands of Youth (July 1926). When Autumn Fire toured the U.S., opening first in Providence, Rhode Island, a critic wrote: "Una O'Connor, who plays Ellen Keegan, the poor drudge of a daughter, bitter against life and love, does fine work. Her excellence will undoubtedly win her the love of an American public."

She made her first appearance on film in Dark Red Roses (1929), followed by Murder! (1930) directed by Alfred Hitchcock, and an uncredited part in To Oblige a Lady (1931).

Despite her lengthy apprenticeship, she had attracted little attention. British critic Eric Johns recalled meeting her in 1931 in which she confessed: "I don't know what I'm going to do if I don't get work ... The end of my savings is in sight and unless something happens soon, I'll not be able to pay the rent". Her luck changed when she was chosen by Noël Coward to appear in Cavalcade at the Theatre Royal, Drury Lane in 1933. When she expressed surprise that Coward had noticed her, Coward replied that he had watched her for years and wrote the part with her in mind. She portrayed an Edwardian servant who transforms herself into a self-made woman. When the curtain came down after a performance attended by Hollywood executives, they exclaimed to each other "We must have that Irish woman. That is obvious". Her success led her to reprise her role in the film version of Cavalcade, released in 1933, and with its success, O'Connor decided to remain in the United States.

Among O'Connor's most successful and best remembered roles are her comic performances in James Whale's The Invisible Man (1933) as the publican's wife, and in Bride of Frankenstein (1935) as the Baron's housekeeper. She also appeared in two films for director John Ford: The Informer (1935) and The Plough and the Stars (1936). Feeling homesick, in 1937 she returned to London for twelve months in the hope of finding a good part but found nothing that interested her. While in England she appeared in three live BBC Television productions, including a play by Irish playwright Teresa Deevy called In Search of Valour (1939) in which she played the part of Stasia Claremorris. After her return to America, the storage facility that housed her furniture and car was destroyed in one of The Blitz strikes, which she took as a sign to remain in America.

Her film career continued with roles in Michael Curtiz's The Adventures of Robin Hood (1938) and The Sea Hawk (1940); and in Leo McCarey's The Bells of St. Mary's (1944). She appeared in stage productions in supporting roles and achieved an outstanding success in the role of Janet McKenzie, the nearly deaf housemaid, in Agatha Christie's Witness for the Prosecution at Henry Miller's Theatre on Broadway from 1954 to 1956; she also appeared in the film version in 1957, directed by Billy Wilder. As one of the witnesses, in what was essentially a serious drama, O'Connor's character was intended to provide comic relief. It was her final film performance.

After a break from her initial forays in television, she took up the medium again by 1950. In 1952, she was able to state that she had been in 38 productions that year alone. In a rare article written by O'Connor, she called working in television "the most exacting and nerve-racking experience that has ever come my way. It is an attempt to do two things at once, a combination of stage and screen techniques with the compensations of neither". Observing many actors disliked television work, O'Connor took the opposite view in liking the medium because it allowed her to play many parts. She lamented that preparation for television work was too short a period for an actor to fully realize the depths of role characterization, but it showed an actor's mettle by the enormous amount of work needed. "Acting talent alone is not enough for the job. It requires intense concentration, an alert-quickmindedness that can take changes in direction at the last minute". O'Connor concluded presciently: "It sounds fantastic and that is just exactly what it is, but it is also an expanding field of employment that has come to stay. As such it is more than welcome here, where the living theatre seems determinedly headed the opposite way".

Reportedly she was "happily resigned" to being typecast as a servant. "There's no such thing as design in an acting career. You just go along with the tide. Nine times out of ten one successful part will set you in a rut from which only a miracle can pry you".

Her weak heart was detected in 1932 when her arrival in America began with detention at Ellis Island because of a "congenital heart condition". By the time of her appearance in the stage version of Witness for the Prosecution she had to stay in bed all day, emerging only to get to the theater and then leaving before the curtain call in order to return to her bed. Her appearance in the film version was intended to be her last.

== Critical responses ==
Eric Johns described O'Connor as

... a frail little woman, with enormous eyes that reminded one of a hunted animal. She could move one to tears with the greatest of ease, and just as easily reduce an audience to helpless laughter in comedies of situation. She was mistress of the art of making bricks without straw. She could take a very small part, but out of the paltry lines at her disposal, create a real flesh-and-blood creature, with a complete and credible life of its own.

She admired John Galsworthy and claimed to have read all his works.

She once said "Acting is a gift from God. It is like a singer's voice. I might quite easily wake up one morning to find that it has been taken from me."

== Personal life and death ==
O'Connor became an American citizen on 3 March 1952. She had been living at the Windsor House at 100 West 58th Street in Manhattan. She died, having never married nor had children, in New York City from heart disease, aged 78, on 4 February 1959 at the Mary Manning Walsh Home. She is interred in Calvary Cemetery in Queens, New York.

== Complete filmography ==
- Dark Red Roses (1929) as Mrs. Weeks
- Murder! (1930) as Mrs. Grogram
- To Oblige a Lady (1931) (uncredited)
- Cavalcade (1933) as Ellen Bridges
- Pleasure Cruise (1933) as Mrs. Signus
- Timbuctoo (1933) as Myrtle
- Horse Play (1933) as Clementia
- Mary Stevens, M.D. (1933) as Mrs. Arnell Simmons
- The Invisible Man (1933) as Jenny Hall
- Orient Express (1934) as Mrs. Peters
- The Poor Rich (1934) as Lady Fetherstone
- All Men Are Enemies (1934) as Annie
- Stingaree (1934) as Annie
- Chained (1934) as Amy, Diane's Maid
- The Barretts of Wimpole Street (1934) as Wilson
- Father Brown, Detective (1934) as Mrs. Boggs
- David Copperfield (1935) as Mrs. Gummidge
- Bride of Frankenstein (1935) as Minnie
- The Informer (1935) as Mrs. McPhillip
- Thunder in the Night (1935) as Julie - Hotel Chambermaid
- The Perfect Gentleman (1936) as Harriet Chatteris
- Rose-Marie (1936) as Anna Roderick
- Little Lord Fauntleroy (1936) as Mary
- Suzy (1936) as Landlady
- Lloyd's of London (1936) as Widow Blake
- The Plough and the Stars (1936) as Mrs. Gogan
- Personal Property (1937) as Clara, Crystal's Maid
- Call It a Day (1937) as Mrs. Milson, the Housekeeper
- The Adventures of Robin Hood (1938) as Bess
- The Return of the Frog (1938) as Mum Oaks
- We Are Not Alone (1939) as Susan O'Connor, Newcome's Maid
- All Women Have Secrets (1939) as Mary
- His Brother's Keeper (1940) as Eva
- It All Came True (1940) as Maggie Ryan
- Lillian Russell (1940) as Marie
- The Sea Hawk (1940) as Miss Latham
- He Stayed for Breakfast (1940) as Doreta
- The Strawberry Blonde (1941) as Mrs. Mulcahey
- Her First Beau (1941) as Effie
- Kisses for Breakfast (1941) as Ellie
- Three Girls About Town (1941) as Maggie O'Callahan
- Always in My Heart (1942) as Angie
- My Favourite Spy (1942) as Cora
- Random Harvest (1942) as Tobacconist
- Forever and a Day (1943) as Mrs. Caroline Ismay
- This Land Is Mine (1943) as Mrs. Emma Lory
- Holy Matrimony (1943) as Sarah Leek
- Government Girl (1943) as Mrs. Harris
- The Canterville Ghost (1944) as Mrs. Umney
- My Pal Wolf (1944) as Mrs. Blevin
- Christmas in Connecticut (1945) as Norah
- The Bells of St. Mary's (1945) as Mrs. Breen
- Cluny Brown (1946) as Mrs. Wilson
- Of Human Bondage (1946) as Mrs. Foreman
- Child of Divorce (1946) as Nora, the Maid
- The Return of Monte Cristo (1946) as Miss Beedle
- Unexpected Guest (1947) as Matilda Hackett
- Lost Honeymoon (1947) as Mrs. Tubbs
- Banjo (1947) as Harriet
- The Corpse Came C.O.D. (1947) as Nora
- Ivy (1947) as Matilda Thrawn
- Fighting Father Dunne (1948) as Miss O'Rourke
- Adventures of Don Juan (1948) as Duenna
- Ha da venì ... don Calogero! (1952) as Angelica, perpetua
- Witness for the Prosecution (1957) as Janet MacKenzie (final film role)

== Stage credits ==
Dates are of the first performance.

Date (year, month, day)	Title	Author(s)	City	Theater	Role
1911-11-20	The Playboy of the Western World	John Millington Synge	New York City	Maxine Elliott's Theatre	IBDB.
1911-11-20	The Well of the Saints	John Millington Synge	New York City	Maxine Elliott's Theatre	IBDB.
1911-12-15	The Shewing-Up of Blanco Posnet	George Bernard Shaw	New York City	Maxine Elliott's Theatre	Jessie
1912-02-12	The Countess Cathleen	William Butler Yeats	Dublin	Abbey Theatre	Angel
1912-02-16	An Tincear agus an t-Sidheog	Douglas Hyde	Dublin	Abbey Theatre	Bean Og
1912-02-22	The Land of Heart's Desire	William Butler Yeats	Dublin	Abbey Theatre	Maire Bruin
1912-02-29	Spreading the News	Lady Gregory	Dublin	Abbey Theatre	Mrs. Fallon
1912-10-03	The Country Dressmaker	George Fitzmaurice	Dublin	Abbey Theatre	Ellie Clohessy
1913-01-03	The Dean of St. Patrick's	G. Sidney Paternoster	Dublin	Abbey Theatre	Mistress Anne Long
1913-02-20	Hannele	Gerhart Hauptmann	Dublin	Abbey Theatre	Sister Martha
1913-04-17	The Stronger	August Strindberg translated by Edith and Warner Oland	Dublin	Abbey Theatre	Mdlle. Y
1913-04-17	Broken Faith	Suzanne R. Day and Geraldine Cummins	Dublin	Abbey Theatre	Mrs. Gara
1913-06-28	The Country Dressmaker	George Fitzmaurice	London	Royal Court Theatre	Min
1913-06-28	The Magic Glasses	George Fitzmaurice	London	Royal Court Theatre	Aunt Jug
1915-12-29	The Starlight Express	Algernon Blackwood	London	Kingsway Theatre	Grannie
1916-01-18	Bauldy	Patrick Wilson	London	Royalty Theatre	Martha Doyle
1916-02-25	The Holy Bond	Monica Ewer	London	New Theatre	Mary
1917-12-16	Insurrection	W. F. Casey	London	Criterion Theatre	Nora O'Connell
1920-04-05	Paddy the Next Best Thing	W. Gayer Mackay and Robert Ord (Edith Ostlere)	London	Strand Theatre	Miss O'Hara
1923-01-17	Plus Fours	Horace Annesley Vachell and Harold Simpson	London	Haymarket Theatre	Mrs. Plumbridgea
1923-12-26	Paddy the Next Best Thing	Gayer Mackay and Robert Ord (Edith Ostlere)	London	Savoy Theatre	Miss O'Hara
1924-03-13	The Fake	Frederick Lonsdale	London	Apollo Theatre	Waitress
1925-05-10	By Right of Conquest	Michael Morton	London	Scala Theatre	Annie
1925-07-01	The Show	John Galsworthy	London	St Martin's Theatre	Cook
1925-07-01	The Ring o' Bells	Neil Lyons	London	Comedy Theatre	Miss Bibby
1926-01-20	The Man Who Was Thursday	Ada Elizabeth Chesterton and Ralph Neale	London	Everyman Theatre	Cook
1926-01-31	Beyond the Horizon	Eugene O'Neill	London	Regent Theatre	Mrs. Atkins
1926-03-28	The Rescue Party	Phyllis Morris	London	Regent Theatre	Maid
1926-04-13	Autumn Fire	T. C. Murray	London	Little Theatre	Ellen Keegan
1926-05-02	Distinguished Villa	Kate O'Brien	London	Aldwych Theatre	Mabel Hemworth
1926-07-04	Quicksands of Youth	Roy Jordan	London	Scala Theatre	Mrs. Redmain
1927-07-18	The Village	Vere Sullivan	London	Globe Theatre	Martha Smith
1927-09-11	Chance Acquaintance	John Van Druten	London	Strand Theatre	Miss Cathcart
1927-09-24	Master	Marjorie Ling	London	Arts Theatre	Mrs. Kerridge
1927-10-23	Mr. Sleeman	Hjalmar Bergman	London	Arts Theatre	Mrs. Mina
1927-09-11	Chance Acquaintance	John Van Druten	London	Criterion Theatre	Miss Cathcart
1927-11-14	The Big Drum	Harold Holland	London	Adelphi Theatre	Mrs. Jowett
1927-12-11	Tamaresque	Clive Currie	London	Strand Theatre	Mrs. Bonnett
1927-12-13	The Soul of Nicholas Snyders	Jerome K. Jerome	London	Everyman Theatre	Dame Toelast
1928-02-06	Macbeth	William Shakespeare	London	Royal Court Theatre	Third Witch
1928-03-11	Nicholas Nickleby	H. Sims, adapted from Charles Dickens	London	Arts Theatre	Fanny Squeers
1928-03-25	The Way	Lady Constance Malleson	London	Arts Theatre	Greta
1928-03-25	Love in a Village	Isaac Bickerstaffe and Thomas Arne	London	Lyric Theatre	Mrs. Deborah Woodcock
1928-07-01	The Tragic Muse	Hubert Griffith	London	Arts Theatre	Mme. Carré
1928-10-25	Birthright	T. C. Murray	London	Arts Theatre	Maura Morrissey
1928-11-05	The Silver Box	John Galsworthy	London	Everyman Theatre	Mrs. Jones
1928-12-09	Wrongs and Rights	Gordon Whitehead	London	Strand Theatre	Fanny Hunt
1928-12-22	The Passing of the Third Floor Back	Jerome K. Jerome	London	Everyman Theatre	Miss Kite
1929-03-08	The Pleasure Garden	Beatrice Mayor	London	Everyman Theatre	Clergyman's wife
1929-05-05	After All	John Van Druten	London	Apollo Theatre	Miss Minnister
1929-05-15	Wrongs and Rights	Gordon Whitehead	London	Strand Theatre	Fanny Hunt
1929-06-19	Exiled	John Galsworthy	London	Wyndham's Theatre	Woman
1929-10-11	The Silver Tassie	Sean O'Casey	London	Apollo Theatre	Mrs. Foran
1929-12-23	The Passing of the Third Floor Back	Jerome K. Jerome	London	Everyman Theatre	Miss Kite
1930-06-18	Long Shadows	Philip Johnson	London	Everyman Theatre	Mrs. Dodd
1930-09-01	The Far-Off Hills	Lennox Robinson	London	Everyman Theatre	Ellen Nolan
1930-10-26	Chassis	Aubrey Ensor	London	Apollo Theatre	Bridget Maloney
1931-02-17	Etienne	Gilbert Wakefield	London	St James's Theatre	Cousin Valérie
1931-02-22	Something Strange	Frank Vosper	London	Phoenix Theatre	Mrs. Highley
1931-03-15	The Accomplice	Frank Popham-Young	London	Arts Theatre	Mercy
1931-03-15	The Gaol Gate	Lady Gregory	London	Arts Theatre	Mary Cushin
1931-03-15	Love at First Sight	-	London	Arts Theatre	
1931-03-15	The Perfect Plot	Aubrey Ensor	London	Arts Theatre	Sara Allgood
1931-03-15	Strange Adventure of a Maiden Lady	Rosalind Wade	London	Arts Theatre	Maiden Lady
1931-10-13	Cavalcade	Noël Coward	London	Drury Lane Theatre	Ellen Bridges
1931-10-25	The Nag's Head	Ernest George	London	Arts Theatre	Barmaid
1939-02-12	The Appointment	Reginald Purdell	London	Vaudeville Theatre	Woman
1945-09-24	The Ryan Girl	Edmund Goulding	New York City	Plymouth Theatre	Weavy Hicks
1948-03-02	The Linden Tree	J. B. Priestley	New York City	Music Box Theatre	Mrs. Cotton
1949-01-18	The Shop at Sly Corner	Edward Percy	New York City	Booth Theatre	Mrs. Catt
1950-01-18	The Enchanted (English adaptation by Maurice Valency)	Jean Giraudoux	New York City	Lyceum Theatre	Leonide Mangebois
1954-01-13	The Starcross Story	Diana Morgan	New York City	Royale Theatre	Ellen
1954-12-16	Witness for the Prosecution	Agatha Christie	New York City	Henry Miller's Theatre	Janet Mackenzie

== Television ==
- The Moon in the Yellow River (BBC 1938) as Aunt Columba
- Death at Newtown-Stewart (BBC 1939)
- In Search of Valour (BBC 1939) as Stasia Claremorris
- "Saturday's Children" on Lux Video Theatre (CBS 2 October 1950)
