= Ostler =

Ostler is a surname, and may refer to:

== People ==
- Andreas Ostler (1921–1988), German Olympic bobsledder
- Blake Ostler (born 1955), American attorney
- Dominic Ostler (born 1970), English cricketer
- Edith Ostlere (1871–1931), British actress and writer
- Gordon Ostlere (1921–2017), English surgeon and anaesthetist
- Nicholas Ostler (born 1952), British linguist
- William Ostler (died 1614), English actor
- Rob Ostlere, English actor

== Other uses ==
- Hostler or ostler, a stableman
