= Our Job in Japan =

1945 film

- Release date: 1945
- Running time: 17 minutes
- Country: United States
- Language: English

The film

Our Job in Japan was a United States military training film made in 1945, shortly after World War II. It is the companion to the more famous Your Job In Germany. The film was aimed at American troops about to go to Japan to participate in the 1945–1952 Allied occupation, and presents the problem of turning the militarist state into a peaceful democracy. The film focused on the Japanese military officials who had used the traditional religion of Shinto, as well as the educational system, to take over power, control the populace, and wage aggressive war.

No personal credits are given by the titles for Our Job in Japan. Theodor S. Geisel, better known by his pen name Dr. Seuss, wrote the film, and Elmo Williams edited it. Both men were working as part of a military film production unit headed by Frank Capra.

At the time, the film was considered sympathetic to the Japanese, and its distribution was apparently suppressed by Douglas MacArthur in his capacity as the overall commander of the Allied forces occupying Japan. A detailed discussion of the film has been given by John W. Dower in his book, Embracing Defeat: Japan in the Wake of World War II.

Our Job in Japan was the basis for the longer, commercially released film Design for Death (1947).

== See also ==
- List of Allied propaganda films of World War II
