= Madge Meredith =

American actress

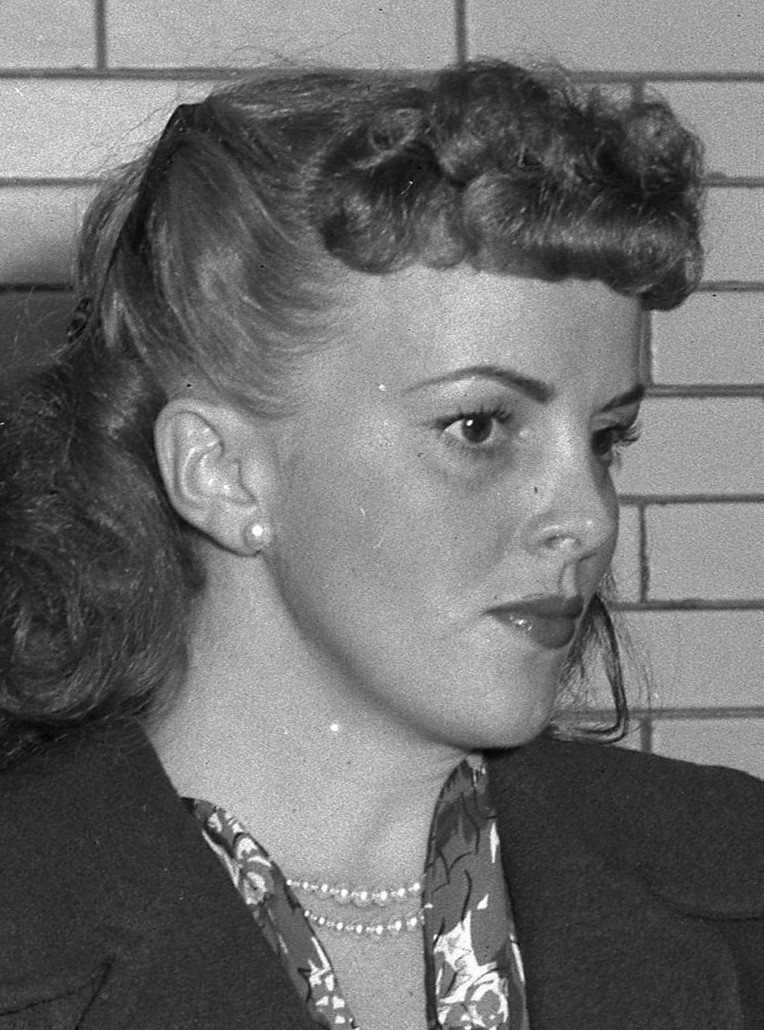
- Meredith in 1949
- Born: Marjorie May Massow; July 15, 1921; Iowa Falls, Iowa
- Died: September 16, 2017 (aged 96); Volcano, Hawaii
- Education: Rice School of the Theater
- Occupation: Actress
- Years active: 1944–1964
- Spouse(s): Dr. Charles L. Corley (1953 - 1958); Mack Hatayama (? - 2017, her death)
- Children: 2

Madge Meredith (born Marjorie May Massow; July 15, 1921 – September 16, 2017) was an American film actress who appeared in numerous films and television series between 1944 and 1964. However, she may have been best known for her wrongful conviction for kidnapping.

== Early years ==
Meredith was born Marjorie May Massow in Iowa Falls, Iowa, the middle child of five. Her father F.A. Massow was a construction superintendent. She focused on dramatics in high school, which helped her manage her stammer. She received a tuition-only scholarship to the Rice School of the Theater in Martha's Vineyard, Massachusetts. Because her family's funds were limited, Meredith worked at the school to pay for her room and board.

In 1941, Meredith and her family moved to Culver City, California in hopes of finding work for her in films. In June 1943, a friend helped her obtain a job in a coffee shop at the 20th Century-Fox studios.

== Career ==
Actress Jennifer Jones noticed Meredith at the coffee shop's cashier desk the late summer of 1943 and invited her to take a screen test. The test was successful, and after undergoing rhinoplasty to correct a perceived problem with her nose, she signed a film contract with 20th Century-Fox. Her first film appearance came as the female lead in Take It or Leave It (1944). She was billed as Marjorie Massow in Take It or Leave It and her following film, In the Meantime, Darling. She changed her name to Madge Meredith in 1945.

In 1946, after an uncredited appearance in the previous year's Kitty, Meredith signed a contract with RKO Pictures. She soon had roles in Child of Divorce (1946), The Falcon's Adventure (1946) and Trail Street (1947).

Following her conviction and imprisonment related to a kidnapping case, Meredith resumed her career in 1952, appearing in uncredited roles in To Hell and Back (1955), Tea and Sympathy (1956), The Ten Commandments (1956) and The Guns of Fort Petticoat (1957), her final feature film.

Following her film career, Meredith appeared on many television series such as Sea Hunt, Northwest Passage, Tales of the Vikings, The Best of the Post and The Littlest Hobo.

== Kidnapping case ==
On July 2, 1947, a warrant was issued for Meredith's arrest charging her and three men with the kidnapping and beating of Nick Gianaclis, Meredith's business manager and Verne Davis, his bodyguard. Meredith denied involvement in the kidnapping and claimed that Gianaclis was trying to exact revenge after she had sued him over the purchase of a house, a lawsuit that was decided in her favor. She also claimed that he became angry when she resisted his romantic advances.

On December 12, 1947, the jury in a four-week trial found Meredith and two co-defendants guilty of five felony charges. Meredith proclaimed her innocence, but her attorney's motion for a new trial was denied. Her conviction was upheld by both the district appeals court and the Supreme Court of California. On May 9, 1949, Meredith entered the California Correctional Institution near Tehachapi to begin serving her sentence.

In March 1951, the parole board recommended Meredith's released after it decided that she had been unjustly convicted. An interim committee on crime and corrections of the California State Assembly issued a report concluding: "The case of Miss Meredith, from beginning to end, is a mockery of investigation, of defense counseling, of trial procedure, and of justice itself."

On July 14, 1951, California's governor Earl Warren ordered Meredith's release from prison, commuting her sentence to time served. He observed: "This is a bizarre case, perhaps more fantastic than any moving picture in which the defendant acted, but certainly having many of the attributes of a scenario."

== Personal life ==
On September 29, 1953, Meredith married Los Angeles-based physician Charles L. Corley, with whom she had one child, a daughter. The couple separated in 1956, and divorced in 1958. She later married Mack Hatayama, with whom she adopted a son.

== Later years ==
After retiring from acting, Meredith devoted her time to helping other victims of injustice.

She died at her home in Volcano, Hawaii in 2017 at the age of 96, survived by her husband, a son and a daughter.

== Filmography ==
Year	Title	Role	Notes
1944	Take It or Leave It	Kate Collins	as Marjorie Massow
1944	In the Meantime, Darling	Mrs. Cook	as Marjorie Massow
1945	Kitty	Minor Role	uncredited
1946	Child of Divorce	Joan Carter Benton	
1946	The Falcon's Adventure	Louisa Braganza	
1947	Trail Street	Susan Pritchett	
1953	Tumbleweed	Sarah Blanden	
1955	To Hell and Back	Corinne	uncredited
1956	Tea and Sympathy	Alumna	uncredited
1956	The Ten Commandments	Slave	uncredited
1957	The Guns of Fort Petticoat	Hazel McCasslin	uncredited
