= Take It or Leave It (1944 film) =

1944 film by Benjamin Stoloff

- Theatrical release poster
- Directed by: Benjamin Stoloff
- Screenplay by: Mac Benoff; Harold Buchman; Snag Werris
- Produced by: Bryan Foy
- Starring: Phil Baker; Edward Ryan; Madge Meredith; Stanley Prager; Roy Gordon; Nana Bryant
- Cinematography: Joseph LaShelle
- Edited by: Harry Reynolds
- Music by: Cyril J. Mockridge
- Production company: 20th Century Fox
- Distributed by: 20th Century Fox
- Release date: July 17, 1944
- Running time: 70 minutes
- Country: United States
- Language: English
- Box office: $1.1 million

Take It or Leave It is a 1944 American musical-comedy film directed by Benjamin Stoloff and written by Mac Benoff, Harold Buchman, and Snag Werris. It was the screen version of the popular radio quiz show of the same name, whose main feature was "the $64 question." Master of ceremonies Phil Baker played himself in the movie.

== Plot ==
Sailor Eddie Collins needs $1,000 to pay his wife's obstetrician. He is selected as a contestant on a special edition of Take It or Leave It, and works his way up to the top prize of $64. Emcee Phil Baker, sympathetic to the sailor's plight, allows him to earn more money by asking additional $64 questions.

== Cast ==
- Phil Baker as himself
- Edward Ryan as Eddie Collins
- Madge Meredith as Kate Collins
- Stanley Prager as Herb Gordon
- Roy Gordon as Dr. Edward Preston
- Nana Bryant as Miss Burke, Preston's secretary
- Nella Walker as Mrs. Preston
- Carleton Young as Program Director
- Phil Silvers as himself
- Renie Riano as Mrs. Nellie Bramble, contestant
- B.S. Pully as Oliver D. Nelson, contestant
- Ralph Sanford as Cab Driver

== Production and reception ==
Take It or Leave It was produced on an exceptionally low budget for a major-studio motion picture. Twentieth Century-Fox producer Bryan Foy economized by casting inexpensive juveniles in principal roles (Edward Ryan, Marjorie Massow—later known as Madge Meredith—and Stanley Prager), with only a few character players in support and bit roles. The only then-current star was Phil Silvers, who appeared briefly in a pre-credits prologue explaining the film's premise.

Bryan Foy slashed the budget even more by inserting entire chunks of old Fox movies into the narrative. Most of the film has Phil Baker asking contestant Edward Ryan questions about famous motion pictures of the past, and each question is accompanied by a production number shown on a screen. Thus Shirley Temple, Alice Faye, Betty Grable, Buster Keaton, Al Jolson, The Ritz Brothers, and other Fox stars make appearances.

Although three screenwriters are credited, the storyline is very slight. The three writers were really radio jokesmiths, hired to supply star Phil Baker with a running repertoire of puns and one-liners appropriate to each quiz question.

The film was released on July 7, 1944. Fox did not publicize the star names in the cast, inviting the audience to play along with the quiz game and be surprised by the film clips. It was a shrewd strategy and a daring gamble, since such a mixture of old and new film footage was unprecedented. Movie trade papers were wary of the film's chances, and wondered whether audiences might feel cheated at having paid admission for a new film, only to be shown mostly old footage. But the film's audience-participation gimmick worked in the film's favor, and theater owners reported enthusiastic crowds. The film ultimately earned one million dollars.
