= Banjo (1947 film) =

1947 drama film directed by Richard Fleischer

- Film poster
- Directed by: Richard Fleischer
- Written by: Lillie Hayward
- Produced by: Lillie Hayward
- Starring: Sharyn Moffett; Jacqueline White; Walter Reed; Una O'Connor
- Cinematography: George E. Diskant
- Edited by: Les Millbrook
- Music by: Alexander Laszlo
- Distributed by: RKO Radio Pictures
- Release dates: May 15, 1947; September 1947
- Running time: 68 minutes
- Country: United States
- Language: English

Banjo is a 1947 American drama film directed by Richard Fleischer and starring Sharyn Moffett, Jacqueline White and Walter Reed.

== Plot ==
After her father dies, Patricia Warren, a girl of nine, must go from her home in Georgia to live with her wealthy but vain and egotistical aunt Elizabeth Ames in Boston. Pat insists on bringing her beloved dog Banjo, an English Setter, when she boards the train north. Since Pat does not want to leave her dog alone, she travels by Banjo's side in the baggage car, where she meets and befriends Bill, who works for the railroad.

When her aunt Elizabeth receives news of Pat's arrival, she has recently broken her engagement to Dr. Bob Hartley, and is on her way to Bermuda. Elizabeth has to cancel her vacation to take care of her niece. Elizabeth is not happy about Banjo accompanying the young girl, and forces the dog to stay outside of the house, despite Pat's protests. The aunt also has quite a few remarks about the girl's uncivilized behavior. A pen is built for Banjo in the garden, but though the servant, Jeffries, builds its walls higher and higher, Banjo still manages to break out.

The second time Banjo breaks out, he hurts his paw and Pat takes him to Dr. Bob for treatment. When the doctor finds out that Pat is related to Elizabeth, he tries to make the aunt relent on her niece, but without any luck. Pat finds out about the previous relationship between her aunt and the doctor, and decides to help her out.

Pat pretends to be ill and must see the doctor on several occasions, and the doctor eagerly agrees to continue play her game. Pat's goal is to make her aunt happier so that Banjo can be accepted and let into the house. Elizabeth goes easier on her "sick" niece and they come closer to each other and Bob. She even warms up enough to Banjo to let Pat walk him around on a leash, but then Pat and her newfound friends in the neighborhood borrow a shotgun to put Banjo's skills as a hunting dog to the test. They misfire, hitting a police car, and Elizabeth decides that the dog has to be sent back to Georgia.

Pat is mortified by the decision, and runs away in the night and boards a train to Georgia to follow her dog. She arrives before Elizabeth and Bob arrive to take her back, and runs into the swamp to look for her favorite pet. When a bobcat attacks Pat in the swamp, Banjo turns up and saves her. One of her previous servants, Jasper, turns up and shoots the bobcat before it can kill Banjo. Pat is reunited with Elizabeth and Dr. Bob, and is promised that Banjo can come with them all back to Boston.

== Cast ==
- Sharyn Moffett as Patricia "Pat" Warren
- Jacqueline White as Elizabeth Ames
- Walter Reed as Dr. Bob Hartley
- Una O'Connor as Harriet
- Lanny Rees as Ned
- Louise Beavers as Lindy
- Herbert Evans as Jeffries
- Theron Jackson as Exodus
- Howard McNeely as Genesis
- Ernest Whitman as Jasper
- Banjo as Himself
- Robert Bray as Police Officer
- Harry Harvey Sr. as Bill

== Production ==
Richard Fleischer's first feature as director was another Sharyn Moffett vehicle, Child of Divorce (1946), which was a success, so he was reteamed with Moffett for Banjo. In April 1946, Lillie Hayward was assigned to write the screenplay and produce the film.

In November 1946, RKO announced that Moffett had been cast in a film titled Angel Face, also written by Hayward.

Banjo was screened for a sophisticated, college-educated preview audience in Westwood Village, near UCLA. The preview was disastrous, with audience members hissing and booing the screen. According to Fleischer, "No one escaped the disaster of Banjo unscathed. Sharyn Moffett got fired; the dog who played Banjo got fired; the producer, Lilly Hayward, got fired. I was the only one who didn't, because I was under studio contract." Richard tells the story wittily in full, with much mirth from the audience, during an archived on-stage interview included in the special features of Arrow Academy's blu-ray release of Soylent Green.
