= Child of Divorce =

1946 film by Richard Fleischer

- Theatrical poster
- Directed by: Richard O. Fleischer
- Screenplay by: Lillie Hayward
- Based on: Wednesday's Child; 1934 play by Leopold Atlas
- Produced by: Lillie Hayward
- Starring: Sharyn Moffett; Regis Toomey; Madge Meredith; Walter Reed; Una O'Connor; Doris Merrick
- Cinematography: Jack MacKenzie
- Edited by: Samuel E. Beetley
- Music by: Leigh Harline
- Distributed by: RKO Radio Pictures
- Release date: October 15, 1946
- Running time: 62 minutes
- Country: United States
- Language: English

Child of Divorce is a 1946 American drama film directed by Richard O. Fleischer in his directorial debut. RKO Pictures had previously adapted the play as the 1934 film Wednesday's Child.

== Plot ==
Eight-year-old Roberta "Bobby" Carter catches her mother Joan as she kisses a man who is not her father in a park. She is embarrassed because her friends are present and recognize her mother. Bobby's father Ray is away on a business trip, but he returns suddenly, bringing a small toy piano as a gift to Bobby, which ironically plays "Home! Sweet Home!" Joan tries to collect enough courage to tell her husband about her affair, but she is unable to confess. Bobby is bullied for her mother's antics and asks God to force her parents to fall in love again. Unaware of her daughter's discovery, Joan continues to see her lover, Michael Benton.

Ray becomes suspicious because of Joan's frequent absence from their home and asks her about it. Joan confesses that she is seeing another man and that she wants a divorce. Bobby watches from a hiding spot and sees her father slap her mother in the face. Joan flees the house and is followed by Bobby. Joan tells her daughter that she is leaving the house and her father immediately and that she is taking Bobby with her, but Bobby is crushed.

Months later, Bobby is asked to the stand in her parents' divorce trial as a witness to her mother's infidelity, but she refuses to provide any information. Her parents divorce and a judge grants Joan custody of Bobby for all of the year except summer. Joan later marries Michael, but Bobby refuses to accept Michael as her stepfather. Michael grows tired of Bobby's behavior and tells Joan that her daughter is destroying their marriage. When Bobby returns to her father in the summer, she is introduced to his new fiancée Louise Norman and becomes even more upset.

The family doctor tells Joan and Ray that Bobby needs stability and continuity in her life to cope, and strongly suggests that only one of them should have sole custody. Neither of the parents feels up to this task, and Bobby is sent to a boarding school. Bobby is eventually visited by her parents, and a schoolmate tells her that she will become accustomed to being alone. To the sound of church bells playing the same tune as on her toy piano, Bobby vows to herself that she will never leave her own children when she is an adult and tuck them into bed every night.

== Cast ==
- Sharyn Moffett as Roberta "Bobby" Carter
- Regis Toomey as Ray Carter
- Madge Meredith as Joan Carter Benton
- Walter Reed as Michael Benton
- Una O'Connor as Nora
- Doris Merrick as Louise Norman
- Harry Cheshire as Judge
- Selmer Jackson as Dr. Sterling
- Lillian Randolph as Carrie
- Pat Prest as Linda
- Gregory Muradian as Freddie
- George McDonald as Donnie
- Patsy Converse as Betty
- Ann Carter as Peggy Allen

Uncredited

- Arthur Space as Joan's attorney
- William Forrest as Proctor

== Production ==
The film was the first feature directed by Richard Fleischer (credited as Richard O. Fleischer), who had directed the This is America documentary series and been signed to a long-term contract with RKO Pictures. Fleischer said that the film was conceived as a vehicle for Sharyn Moffett, "a ten-year-old actress that the studio hoped would turn into a Shirley Temple or a Margaret O'Brien, a metamorphosis devoutly to be wished. Actually she was a good little actress, better than most of the adults around her. The chrysalis, however, stubbornly refused to turn into a butterfly. She never did fly."

Fleischer was assigned as the film's director in August 1945.

== Release ==
According to Fleischer, "the movie turned out remarkably well." He was then assigned to another Moffett vehicle, Banjo, which was less commercially successful.
