= Gregory Moffett =

American child actor

- Occupation: Actor
- Years active: 1948–1957
- Relatives: Sharyn Moffett (sister)

Gregory Moffett is an American former child actor who appeared in several films and television series in the 1950s. His older sister, Sharyn Moffett, was a child actress. Their parents were also in the entertainment business. In 1949, he signed a seven-year long film contract with Paramount, earning $125 per week. He was in films such as Let's Dance (1950), and Robot Monster (1953), which is regarded as one of the worst movies ever made. He played Johnny, the professor's only son. He also appeared in television shows like Adventures of Superman.
