= The Falcon's Adventure =

1946 film by William A. Berke

- Film poster
- Directed by: William Berke
- Written by: Michael Arlen
- Screenplay by: Aubrey Wisberg; Robert E. Kent
- Produced by: Herman Schlom; Sid Rogell
- Starring: Tom Conway
- Cinematography: Frank Redman; Harry J. Wild
- Edited by: Marvin Coil
- Music by: Paul Sawtell
- Production company: RKO Radio Pictures
- Distributed by: RKO Radio Pictures
- Release date: December 13, 1946 (U.S.)
- Running time: 61 minutes
- Country: United States
- Language: English

The Falcon's Adventure is a 1946 American mystery film directed by William Berke and starring Tom Conway, Madge Meredith and Edward Brophy. It is the 13th of 16 films about the Falcon and the final film of RKO's Falcon series starring Conway. It was directed by William Berke, who had served as producer for the previous entry in the series, 1946's The Falcon's Alibi.

== Plot ==
Tom Lawrence, known as the Falcon, is about to go on a fishing holiday with his sidekick Goldie Locke, who has convinced him to stop thinking of women or crime. However, when he sees a woman abducted in a taxicab, the Falcon rescues her. The woman, Louise Bragaza, tells him that she was the target of kidnappers as her father had invented a process to manufacture synthetic diamonds. The Falcon and Goldie travel to Miami to rescue Louise's father.

== Cast ==
- Tom Conway as Tom Lawrence
- Madge Meredith as Louisa Braganza
- Edward Brophy as Goldie Locke
- Robert Warwick as Kenneth Sutton
- Myrna Dell as Doris Blanding
- Steve Brodie as Benny
- Ian Wolfe as J.D. Denison
- Carol Forman as Helen Ray
- Joseph Crehan as Inspector Cavanaugh
- Phil Warren as Mike Geary
- Tony Barrett as Paolo Ray
- Harry Harvey as Detective Sgt. Duncan
- Jason Robards Sr. as Lieutenant Evans

== External list ==
- The Falcon's Adventure at IMDb
- The Falcon's Adventure at the TCM Movie Database (archived)
- The Falcon's Adventure at the AFI Catalog of Feature Films
