= Night Freight =

1955 film

- Theatrical release poster
- Directed by: Jean Yarbrough
- Written by: Steve Fisher
- Produced by: Ace Herman
- Starring: Forrest Tucker; Barbara Britton; Keith Larsen; Thomas Gomez; Michael Ross; Myrna Dell
- Cinematography: William A. Sickner
- Edited by: Chandler House
- Production company: William F. Broidy Productions
- Distributed by: Allied Artists Pictures
- Release date: August 28, 1955
- Running time: 79 minutes
- Country: United States
- Language: English

Night Freight is a 1955 American drama film directed by Jean Yarbrough and written by Steve Fisher. The film stars Forrest Tucker, Barbara Britton, Keith Larsen, Thomas Gomez, Michael Ross and Myrna Dell. The film was released on August 28, 1955, by Allied Artists Pictures.

== Cast ==
- Forrest Tucker as Mike Peters
- Barbara Britton as Wanda Haycock
- Keith Larsen as Don Peters
- Thomas Gomez as Ed Haight
- Michael Ross as Louis
- Myrna Dell as Sally
- Lewis Martin as Richard Crane
- G. Pat Collins as Kelly
- Sam Flint as Gordon
