= Elmo Williams =

American film/TV editor, producer, director (1913–2015)

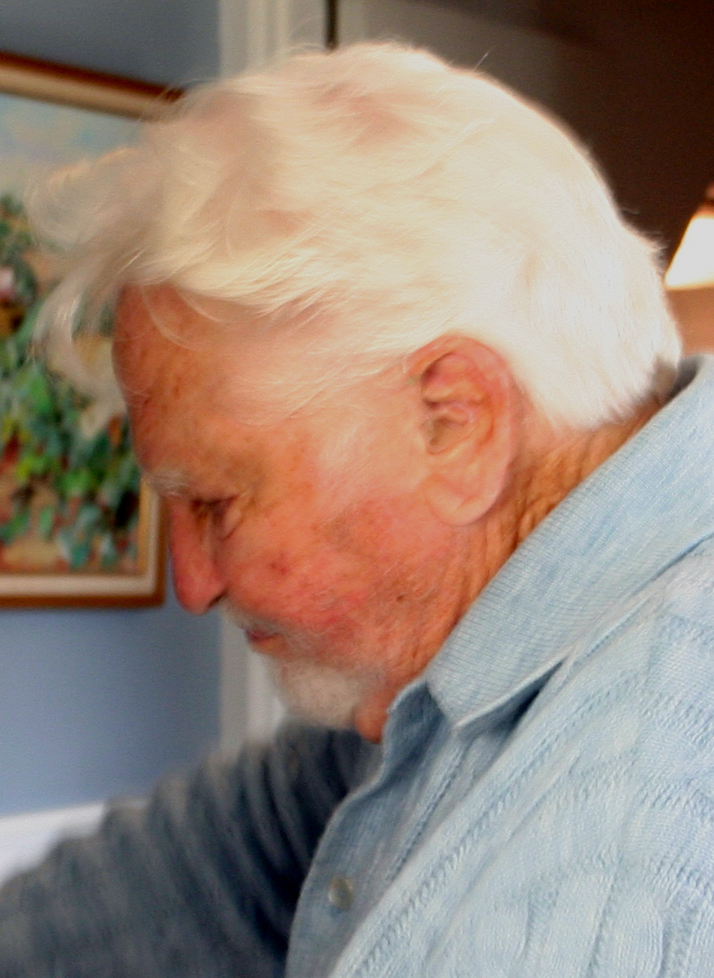
- Williams in 2007
- Born: James Elmo Williams; April 30, 1913; Lone Wolf, Oklahoma, U.S.
- Died: November 25, 2015 (aged 102); Brookings, Oregon, U.S.
- Occupations: film editor, film producer
- Spouse: Lorraine Williams (m. 1940; died 2004)
- Awards: ACE Golden Eddie 1971; ACE Career Achievement 1990

James Elmo Williams (April 30, 1913 – November 25, 2015) was an American film and television editor, producer, director and executive. His work on the film High Noon (1952) received the Academy Award for Best Film Editing. In 2006, Williams published Elmo Williams: A Hollywood Memoir.

== Career ==
Among the films that Williams edited are High Noon (1952), 20,000 Leagues Under the Sea (1954) and The Vikings (1958). Williams was involved in the production of The Longest Day (1962) and Cleopatra (1963), and he was a producer of the film Tora! Tora! Tora! (1970). Between 1971 and 1974, Williams was the Head of Production for 20th Century Fox.

Williams edited the film Design for Death (1947), which won an Academy Award for Best Documentary Feature. Williams won the Academy Award for Best Film Editing for his work on 1952's High Noon (directed by Fred Zinnemann and co-edited with Harry W. Gerstad, although he was subordinate to Gerstad), and was nominated again for 1954's 20,000 Leagues Under the Sea (directed by Richard Fleischer).

High Noon was listed as the 54th best-edited film of all time in a 2012 survey of members of the Motion Picture Editors Guild, and the editing of High Noon is probably Williams' most studied accomplishment. Critic James Berardinelli wrote, "High Noon's tension comes through Kane's desperation, aided in no small part by Elmo Williams' brilliant editing as the clock ticks down to twelve. For a motion picture with so little action, the suspense builds to almost unbearable levels." In his memoir, Williams states that this well-known montage was specifically edited to match the music composed for the scene by Dimitri Tiomkin.

Williams was credited as associate producer and coordinator of battle episodes on The Longest Day (1962). He was also an uncredited second unit director. He later produced another historical World War II film Tora! Tora! Tora! (1970), also for Darryl F. Zanuck.

Williams was elected to membership in the American Cinema Editors (ACE). In 1971, Williams was honored with the ACE "Golden Eddie" award as Filmmaker of the Year. In 1990, Williams received the ACE Career Achievement Award; he was among the first six editors to be honored as such.

On May 14, 2011, Williams featured in Slow Children's music video “Learn to Love”.

== Personal life ==
Williams was born in Lone Wolf, Oklahoma. In 1940, he married Lorraine Williams, who died in 2004. They adopted two daughters and a son. The couple retired to Brookings, Oregon, on the Oregon Coast in 1983. In December 2008, Williams donated a public chapel to the city in memory of his wife. The chapel, named Capella By The Sea, is located in Azalea Park in Brookings.

Lorraine wrote the lyrics to the theme song for the movie Those Magnificent Men in Their Flying Machines (1965); British composer Ron Goodwin set them to music and conducted.

He turned 100 in April 2013.

Elmo Williams died at his home in Brookings on November 25, 2015, at the age of 102.

Elmo's brother Burch Williams was killed in an accident when a biplane crashed into the helicopter Burch was in during the filming of aerial sequences for the 1971 film Zeppelin.
