= A Boy, a Girl and a Dog =

1946 film

- Original film poster
- Directed by: Herbert Kline
- Screenplay by: Maurice Clark; Irving Fineman; Herbert Kline
- Story by: Leopold Atlas
- Produced by: W.R. Frank
- Starring: Sharyn Moffett; Jerry Hunter; Harry Davenport; Lionel Stander; Charles Williams; Charlotte Treadway
- Cinematography: Edward A. Kull
- Edited by: Marguerite Francisco
- Music by: Willy Stahl
- Production company: W.R. Frank Productions
- Distributed by: Film Classics
- Release date: July 1, 1946
- Running time: 75 minutes
- Country: United States
- Language: English

A Boy, a Girl and a Dog is a 1946 American drama film directed by Herbert Kline and written by Maurice Clark, Irving Fineman and Herbert Kline. The film stars Sharyn Moffett, Jerry Hunter, Harry Davenport, Lionel Stander, Charles Williams and Charlotte Treadway. The film, shot in part at the War Department's Canine Training Center in San Carlos, California was completed in 1944 but was not released until July 1, 1946, by Film Classics. The film was rereleased in 1951 by Astor Pictures as Lucky, the Outcast.

In 1960, producer W.R. Frank rereleased the film as a double feature with his 1949 horse film The Great Dan Patch.

== Cast ==
- Sharyn Moffett as Button
- Jerry Hunter as Kip
- Harry Davenport as Gramps
- Lionel Stander as Jim
- Charles Williams as Mr. Stone
- Charlotte Treadway as Mrs. Foster
- Howard Johnson as Lt. Stephens
- John Vosper as Mr. Hamilton
- Nancy Evans as Mrs. Hamilton
