= Design for Death =

1947 film

- Theatrical poster
- Directed by: Richard Fleischer
- Written by: Theodor S. Geisel; Helen Palmer
- Produced by: Sid Rogell; Theron Warth
- Narrated by: Kent Smith; Hans Conried
- Edited by: Marston Fay; Elmo Williams
- Distributed by: RKO Radio Pictures
- Release date: 1947
- Running time: 48 minutes
- Country: United States
- Language: English

Design for Death is a 1947 American documentary film that won the Academy Award for Best Documentary Feature. It was based on a shorter U.S. Army training film, Our Job in Japan, that had been produced in 1945–1946 for the soldiers occupying Japan after World War II. Both films dealt with Japanese culture and the origins of the war.

Following the war, Peter Rathvon at RKO, who had seen Our Job in Japan during his own military service, decided to produce a commercial version of the film. He hired the original writer and editor to work on the new project. Theodor S. Geisel, better known by his pen name Dr. Seuss, co-authored Design for Death with his wife Helen Palmer Geisel. Elmo Williams was the editor for both films. Subsequently, Sid Rogell replaced Rathvon, and became the film's producer.

The film was given wide release in January 1948; a review in Daily Variety characterized it as "a documentary of fabulous proportions ... one of the most interesting screen presentations of the year". Bosley Crowther, writing in The New York Times, was not complimentary; he wrote that the film "makes the general point that too much control by a few people is a dangerous – a 'racketeering' – thing and that another world war can be prevented only by the development of responsible, representative governments throughout the world. That is a valid message, but the weakness with which it is put forth in a melange of faked and factual pictures and in a ponderous narration does not render it very forceful".

In his memoir, Elmo Williams maintains that he and Geisel created Design for Death nearly in its entirety, and that the credits for Fleischer and Warth were nominal ones. Rogell, Fleischer, and Warth received the Academy Awards for the film.

Copies of Design for Death are apparently rare. Geisel thought that they had all been destroyed. However, the Academy of Motion Picture Arts and Sciences sponsored a screening in October 2005, and parts of the film were included in the documentary The Political Dr. Seuss. Some materials related to Design for Death, including its script, are in an archive of Geisel's papers at the University of California, San Diego.

== Cast ==
- Kent Smith as Narrator
- Hans Conried as Narrator
