= Myrna Dell =

American actress (1924–2011)

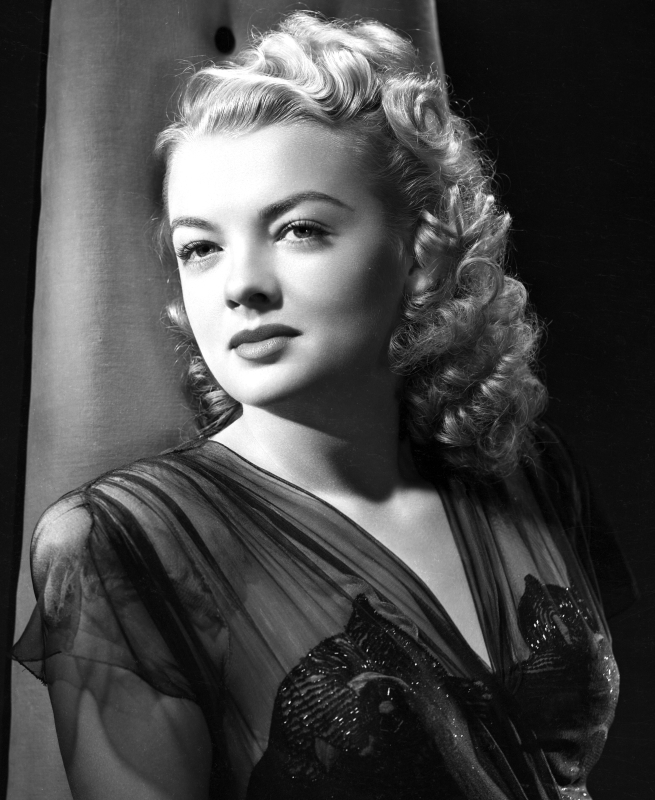
- Born: Marilyn Adele Dunlap; March 5, 1924; Los Angeles, California, U.S.
- Died: February 11, 2011 (aged 86); Los Angeles, California, U.S.
- Occupations: Actress; writer
- Years active: 1940–1990
- Spouse(s): Jack Buchtel (m. 1951; div. 19??); Herbert Patterson (m. 19??)
- Children: 1

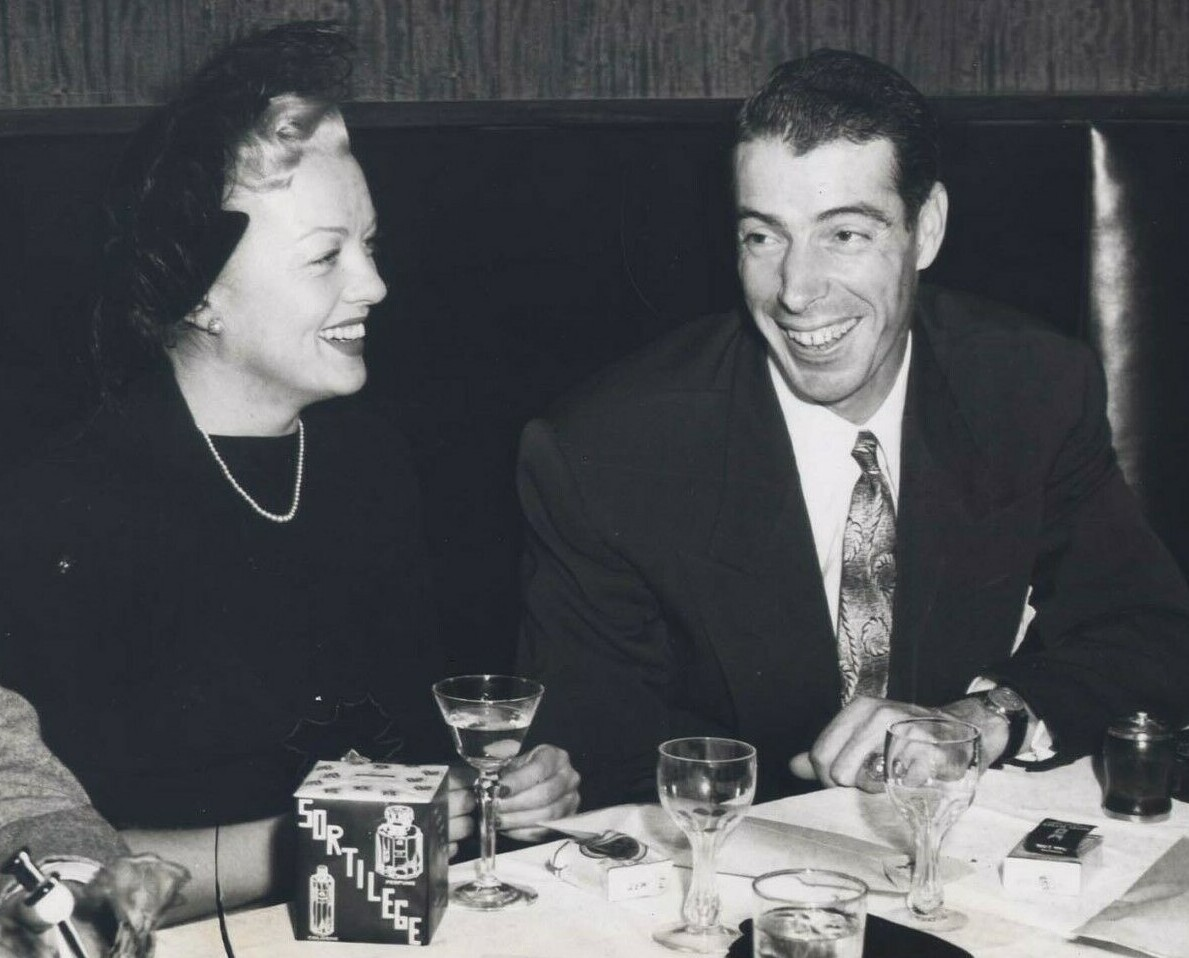
With Joe DiMaggio at the Stork Club, 1949

Myrna Dell (born Marilyn Adele Dunlap; March 5, 1924 – February 11, 2011) was an American actress, model, and writer who appeared in numerous motion pictures and television programs over four decades. A Hollywood glamour girl in the early part of her career, she is best known today for her work in B-pictures, particularly film noir thrillers and Westerns.

== Early life and career ==
Dell's mother was silent-film actress Carol Price. Dell entered show business when she was 16 as a dancer with the Earl Carroll Revue in New York. Her film debut came in A Night at Earl Carroll's (1940), after which she appeared in Ziegfeld Girl (1941), Raiders of Red Gap (1943), and Up in Arms (1943).

She found work at Monogram Pictures, a "budget" studio specializing in inexpensive entertainments for double-feature theaters. She appeared as an ingenue in a B-western, Arizona Whirlwind (1944), with silent-screen veterans Ken Maynard, Hoot Gibson, and Bob Steele.

She signed a contract with RKO Radio Pictures in 1944, and followed the path of other RKO starlets: bit parts and chorus-girl appearances in features, then dialogue roles in short subjects starring Leon Errol or Edgar Kennedy, and then featured roles in "B" pictures and smaller roles in "A" pictures. Myrna Dell was very prolific at RKO, and many fans know her best from these pictures. Beginning as a showgirl in the Eddie Cantor-Joan Davis musical comedy Show Business (1944), Dell gradually worked her way up, from a Zane Grey western to gradually larger roles in three of the studio's popular Falcon mysteries with Tom Conway, and finally becoming established as a hard-boiled glamour girl in film noir thrillers like Nocturne (1946), The Locket (1946), and Destination Murder (1950). She once told a reporter that she loathed the glamour-girl image, stating, "After a time... a girl gets bored with the glamour, the atmosphere, the drinking, the cigarettes to smoke, the wolves." Between assignments she returned to the Leon Errol unit to play dangerous blondes opposite the flustered comic, and would even play incidental walk-ons not calling for any dialogue (she's the nightclub blonde silently kibitzing Tommy Noonan's card game in the 1946 comedy Ding Dong Williams).

In 1948 her term contract with RKO ran out, and she began freelancing at other studios. She played sultry blondes for Republic, Columbia, Universal, Paramount, and Lippert. She occasionally returned to RKO and Monogram; her last major role in motion pictures was as the femme fatale in Monogram's Bowery Boys comedy Here Come the Marines (1952).

With roles in feature films becoming fewer, Dell turned to television in 1952 for the China Smith series. She went on to appear on such programs as Gang Busters, Lux Video Theatre, Crusader, Dragnet, The Ethel Barrymore Theatre, Maverick, Pete and Gladys, Batman, Hazel, The Donna Reed Show, and The Texan. Her last film appearance was in Buddy Buddy (1981)

In her later years, she worked as a writer for Hollywood: Then and Now Magazine in which she shared countless stories about her days as an actress and thanking such figures as Jack L. Warner, Louis B. Mayer, and Samuel Goldwyn for their contributions to the film industry.

== Personal life and death ==
On June 15, 1951, Dell married Jack Buchtel, a restaurateur. They divorced a year later. In 1956, she married Herbert Patterson, an actor.

A California resident all her life, Dell continued living in the state by spending her final years in Studio City, California, answering fan mail and keeping her fans up to date through her personal website. She died from natural causes on February 11, 2011, at her studio apartment one month shy of her 87th birthday. She was survived by one daughter, Laura Patterson, who spread her ashes next to the Hollywood Sign. Her granddaughter is Ava Capri, an actress.

== Filmography ==
- 1940: A Night at Earl Carroll's - Showgirl (uncredited)
- 1941: Ziegfeld Girl - Ziegfeld Girl (uncredited)
- 1943: Raiders of Red Gap - Jane Roberts
- 1943: In Old Oklahoma - Blonde (uncredited)
- 1943: Jive Junction - Senior Hostess (uncredited)
- 1943: Raiders of Red Gap - Jane Roberts
- 1944: Up in Arms - Goldwyn Girl (uncredited)
- 1944: Arizona Whirlwind - Ruth Hampton
- 1944: Show Business - Showgirl (uncredited)
- 1944: Thirty Seconds Over Tokyo - Girl in Officers' Club (uncredited)
- 1944: Belle of the Yukon - Chorine (uncredited)
- 1945: Wanderer of the Wasteland - Gambler's Girl (uncredited)
- 1945: The Falcon in San Francisco - Beautiful Girl in Hotel Hall (uncredited)
- 1945: Radio Stars on Parade - Phil's Secretary (uncredited)
- 1945: Double Honeymoon (Short) - Newlywed Wife
- 1945: It's Your Move (Short) - Neighbor (uncredited)
- 1945: Beware of Redheads (Short) - Gloria Richards, the Redhead
- 1945: Man Alive - River Boat Captain's Daughter (uncredited)
- 1946: Maid Trouble (Short)
- 1946: The Spiral Staircase - Murder Victim (uncredited)
- 1946: Oh, Professor Behave! (Short)
- 1946: The Falcon's Alibi - Falcon's Dancing Partner (uncredited)
- 1946: Ding Dong Williams - Club Creon Blonde (uncredited)
- 1946: Twin Husbands (Short) - Miss Ward
- 1946: I'll Take Milk (Short) - Barbara
- 1946: Step by Step - Gretchen
- 1946: Nocturne - Susan
- 1946: Lady Luck - Mabel (uncredited)
- 1946: Vacation in Reno - Madeleine Dumont
- 1946: The Falcon's Adventure - Doris Blanding
- 1946: The Locket - Thelma
- 1948: The Judge Steps Out - Mrs. Joan Winthrop
- 1948: Fighting Father Dunne - Paula Hendricks
- 1948: Guns of Hate - Dixie Merritt
- 1948: The Uninvited Blonde (Short) - Lulu, The Uninvited Blonde
- 1949: Rose of the Yukon - Rose Flambeau
- 1949: Search for Danger - Wilma Rogers
- 1949: The Lost Tribe - Norina
- 1949: Roughshod - Helen Carter
- 1949: Lust for Gold - Lucille (uncredited)
- 1949: The Girl from Jones Beach - Lorraine Scott
- 1949: The Gal Who Took the West - Nancy
- 1950: Radar Secret Service - Marge
- 1950: Destination Murder - Alice Wentworth
- 1950: The Furies - Dallas Hart
- 1950: Joe Palooka in the Squared Circle - Sandra Reed
- 1951: Never Trust a Gambler - Dolores Alden
- 1951: Secrets of Beauty - Kay Joyce
- 1951: The Strip - Paulette Ardrey
- 1951: The Bushwhackers - Norah Taylor
- 1951: Reunion in Reno - Mrs. Virginia Mason
- 1952: Gang Busters (TV Series) - Norma Breighlee / Officer Jone Perlie
- 1952: Here Come the Marines - Lulu Mae
- 1952: China Smith (TV Series) - 'Empress' Shira
- 1953: Mr. & Mrs. North (TV Series) - Fifi LaMer
- 1954: Lux Video Theatre (TV Series) - Cynthia
- 1954: The New Adventures of China Smith (TV Series)
- 1955: Night Freight - Sally
- 1955: Toughest Man Alive - Nancy
- 1955: Last of the Desperados - Clara Wightman
- 1956: Jungle Jim (TV Series) - Mickey Worth
- 1956: Crusader (TV Series) - Julie
- 1956: The Naked Hills - Aggie
- 1956: Ethel Barrymore Theater (TV Series)
- 1956: Dragnet (TV Series)
- 1956: The Millionaire (TV Series) - Helen
- 1953-1957: Schlitz Playhouse (TV Series) - Mae Holmes / Sally
- 1957: State Trooper (TV Series) - Carol Smith
- 1957: The Adventures of Jim Bowie (TV Series) - Helen Harris
- 1958: Maverick (TV Series) - Anita
- 1959: U.S. Marshal (TV Series)
- 1959: The Texan (TV Series) - Miss Delly
- 1960: Ma Barker's Killer Brood - Lou
- 1961: Pete and Gladys - Mrs. Wingfield
- 1963: The Donna Reed Show (TV Series) - Saleswoman
- 1963: Hazel (TV Series) - Receptionist
- 1966: Batman (TV Series) - Pedestrian
- 1978: The One Man Jury - Landlady
- 1981: Buddy Buddy - Cashier (final film role)
- 1990: Unsolved Mysteries (TV Series) - Myrna Patterson
