= The Falcon in San Francisco =

1945 film by Joseph H. Lewis

- Theatrical release poster
- Directed by: Joseph H. Lewis
- Written by: Robert E. Kent; Ben Markson
- Based on: Characters created by Michael Arlen
- Produced by: Maurice Geraghty; Sid Rogell
- Starring: Tom Conway; Rita Corday; Edward Brophy; Sharyn Moffett
- Cinematography: Virgil Miller; William A. Sickner
- Edited by: Ernie Leadlay
- Music by: Paul Sawtell
- Production company: RKO Pictures
- Distributed by: RKO Pictures
- Release date: July 25, 1945 (US)
- Running time: 66 minutes
- Country: United States
- Language: English

The Falcon in San Francisco is a 1945 American crime and mystery film directed by Joseph H. Lewis and stars Tom Conway, Rita Corday and Edward Brophy, who played the recurring role of "Goldie" Locke. (Note: After five Falcon films without the erstwhile sidekick, Goldie Locke makes his return with Ed Brophy in his first of two appearances.) The film was the 11th in The Falcon series of detective films, and the eighth featuring Conway as the amateur sleuth. The Falcon in San Francisco was the final film in the series produced by Maurice Geraghty, after which budgets were reduced and location shooting largely abandoned.

== Plot ==
While travelling by train with his sidekick and assistant, "Goldie" Locke, for a vacation in San Francisco, Tom Lawrence, a.k.a. The Falcon, meets Annie Marshall, a lonely little girl. Annie tells them that she is being held prisoner by her nurse, Miss Carla Keyes, and butler Loomis. Annie's story is cut short when Miss Keyes comes for her. Shortly after, the little girl rushes back to Tom to tell him she cannot wake her nurse; Keyes turns out to be dead.

Tom takes charge of Annie, but the police are notified by an anonymous source that the little girl is being kidnapped. After they arrive in San Francisco, he takes her home in a taxi, but the police apprehend the Falcon. Released on $10,000 bail, posted by Doreen Temple, a complete stranger, who promises Tom she will disclose the motive behind her generosity. At dinner that evening, Doreen brings along her bodyguard Rickey, posing as a police officer. When they leave, Rickey knocks Tom out and takes him to Doreen's apartment, where she interrogates him about someone named Vantine. When he denies knowing the man, she does not believe him and has Rickey beat him up with the help of another man; Doreen lets him go, telling him to take Vantine a message: to stay away from something called the Citadel.

After Tom returns to his hotel to collect Goldie, they decide to pay a visit to Annie's house, where they meet her older sister Joan who denies knowing either Doreen or Vantine. Annie claims she made up the story about being held captive, but when Tom sneaks back to the house to talk to her, she says Loomis is holding her prisoner. She takes them to Carla's room where they find a photograph of a ship's officer, signed to his wife, Carla.

Loomis hears someone rummaging around in the nurse's room, but is shot dead by an unknown assailant. Returning to their hotel, Tom is confronted by Vantine, brandishing a gun. When Tom disarms him, he learns Doreen was the romantic interest of an ex-bootlegger, Duke Monette, involved with a shipment aboard the cargo ship S.S. Citadel.

Tom visits the Star Coastal lines where DeForrest, the company's general manager, is meeting with Joan, the owner of the company. A clerk at the office alerts Tom to go to an address, which turns out to be Doreen's apartment, where she is waiting with her gang. Vantine, also lured into her trap, arrives and begins to fight with Doreen's thugs. Tom and Joan manage an escape but on his return to his hotel room, discovers DeForrest hiding in a closet. Goldie finds a newspaper article that shows that the real owner of the Citadel is Duke Monette.

That night Tom and Goldie sneak aboard the ship and find raw silk hidden among the bales of hemp cargo. Returning to the Marshall house, the little girl tells Tom that Joan has left to meet her "secret lover" on Telegraph Hill. Tom observes the rendezvous with Joan and DeForrest, who Tom thinks is really Duke Monette, confessing that he used a secret identity to protect his daughters, Joan and Annie.

Fearing Doreen plans to hijack the illicit silk cargo that night, Duke asks for the detective's help. At dockside, Duke and Tom watch Vantine, Doreen and the other gang members board the Citadel. Duke suddenly knocks the ship's engineer unconscious, and blows up the unattended boiler room, then pulls a gun on Doreen and Tom.

Tom tells Doreen that Duke killed Miss Keyes and Loomis, the employees she hired to watch over the girls. When Tom warns that Duke plans to blow up the ship, Doreen and Rickey lunge forward to disarm Duke, who shoots them both, but Rickey shoots Duke, allowing Tom to flee before the ship explodes.

== Cast ==
- Tom Conway as Tom Lawrence
- Rita Corday as Joan Marshall
- Edward Brophy as "Goldie" Locke
- Sharyn Moffett as Annie Marshall
- Fay Helm as Doreen Temple
- Robert Armstrong as Duke Monette / DeForrest Marshall
- Carl Kent as Rickey
- Jason Robards Sr. as Loomis - the Butler (uncredited)
- George Holmes as Dalman
- John Mylong as Peter Vantine / Carl Dudley
- George Holmes as Dalman
- Edmund Cobb as Police officer
- Ralph Dunn as Police officer
- Eden Nicholas as Clerk
- Joan Beckstead as Sexy girl
- Hermine Sterler as Miss Carla Keyes
- Max Rose as Taxi driver
- Dorothy Adams as Chambermaid
- Maxine Semon as Plain girl
- Mary Worth as Dowager
- Myrna Dell as Beautiful girl
- Linda Van Loon as Beautiful girl
- Johnny Strong as First mate
- Jack Gargan as Waiter
- Philip Morris as Conductor
- Sam Harris as Pullman porter
- Napoleon Whiting as Pullman porter
- Norman Mayes as Redcap
- Harry Strang as Desk sergeant
- Perc Launders as Turnkey
- Kernan Cripps as Police captain

== Production ==
"My Shining Hour" (1943) (uncredited) and "The Sky's the Limit"(music only), music by Harold Arlen, lyrics by Johnny Mercer was played by house orchestra in the nightclub scene. Sequences in The Falcon in San Francisco were shot on location at prominent locations in San Francisco.

== Reception ==
Film historians Richard Jewell and Vernon Harbin described The Falcon in San Francisco, as part of a programmed series. "One of the quaint conventions of the Falcon series was that whenever Tom Conway embarked on a vacation, a corpse would pop up to interrupt his relaxation".

In a recent review of the Falcon series for the Time Out Film Guide, Tom Milne wrote, "Conway, bringing a lighter touch to the series (which managed its comic relief better than most), starred in nine films after The Falcon's Brother, most of them deft and surprisingly enjoyable." After its release into home video, The Falcon in San Francisco was reviewed in DVD Active.com, "The plot gets thicker than Northern gravy with boiled potatoes when more bodies hit the sawdust, and links to a shipping magnate are uncovered - all linked to a man with no past and a gangster thought to be long dead. Will The Falcon unravel this mystery without taking a bullet? Will the mafia have their plan thwarted? Can Goldie find himself a bride to reduce his level of income tax?"
