= Richard Fleischer =

American film director (1916–2006)

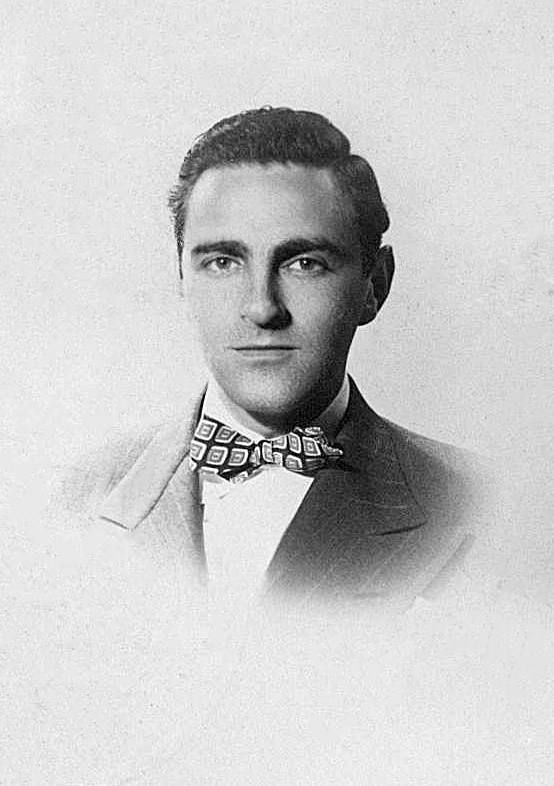
- Fleischer in 1946
- Born: December 8, 1916; New York City, U.S.
- Died: March 25, 2006 (aged 89); Los Angeles, California, U.S.
- Other names: Richard O. Fleischer; Dick Fleischer
- Education: Brown University (BA); Yale University (MFA)
- Occupations: Film director, chairman of Fleischer Studios
- Years active: 1942–1999
- Spouse: Mary Dickson (m. 1943) (1919–2009)
- Children: 3
- Father: Max Fleischer
- Relatives: Dave Fleischer (uncle); Lou Fleischer (uncle); Seymour Kneitel (brother-in-law)
- Website: richardfleischer.com (memorial)

Richard Owen Fleischer (/ˈflaɪʃər/; December 8, 1916 – March 25, 2006) was an American film director. His career spanned more than four decades, beginning at the height of the Golden Age of Hollywood in the 1940s, and lasting through the New Hollywood era, until the late 1980s. He was the son of animation pioneer Max Fleischer, and served as chairman of Fleischer Studios.

Fleischer began his career in B department of RKO Pictures, mainly directing noirs and crime dramas like The Narrow Margin (1952). Though he went on to direct films across many genres and styles, he is best known for his big-budget "tentpole" films and star vehicles, including: 20,000 Leagues Under the Sea (1954), The Vikings (1958), Barabbas (1961), Fantastic Voyage (1966), Doctor Dolittle (1967), Tora! Tora! Tora! (1970), Soylent Green (1973), Mandingo (1975), and the Robert E. Howard sword-and-sorcery films Conan the Destroyer (1984) and Red Sonja (1985).

He is also known for his informal series of true crime films — The Girl in the Red Velvet Swing (1955), based on the Nesbit-Thaw scandal; Compulsion (1959), based on the Leopold and Loeb trial; The Boston Strangler (1968), based on the early 1960s serial killer; and 10 Rillington Place (1971), based on John Christie. Early in his career, he directed the Oscar-winning documentary Design for Death (1947).

Noted for his versatility, Fleischer was regarded to be popular among producers and studios. Though he was not considered an auteur and was never a highly acclaimed artist in his lifetime, many of Fleischer's films proved very financially and critically successful.

== Early life and education ==
Richard Fleischer was born to a Jewish family in Brooklyn, New York City, the son of Essie (née Goldstein) and animator/producer Max Fleischer, a native of Kraków, Austria, now Poland. After graduating from Brown University, he went to Yale School of Drama, where he met his future wife, Mary Dickson.

Fleischer served in the U.S. Army during World War II. His film career began in 1942 at the RKO studio, directing shorts, documentaries, and compilations of forgotten silent features, which he called "Flicker Flashbacks". He won an Academy Award as producer of the 1947 documentary Design for Death, co-written by Theodor Geisel (later known as Dr. Seuss), which examined the cultural forces that led to Japan's imperial expansion through World War II.

== Career ==
=== B movies ===
Fleischer moved to Los Angeles and was assigned his first feature, Child of Divorce (1946), a vehicle for Sharyn Moffett. It was successful so Fleischer was assigned to Banjo, another Moffett vehicle, which was a disaster.

RKO agreed to loan him to Stanley Kramer and Carl Foreman, who had admired Child of Divorce, to make So This Is New York (1948) for the Kramer Company at Columbia. Back at RKO, Fleischer made The Clay Pigeon, a thriller based on a story by Foreman.

His other early films were taut film noirs, such as: Bodyguard (1948), Follow Me Quietly (1949), Armored Car Robbery (1950) and The Narrow Margin (1952).

Fleischer said he constantly tried to graduate to A pictures during this time. When Norman Krasna and Jerry Wald set up at RKO, they asked Fleischer to see if he could make a film out of any of the film shot for It's All True but he was unable. Another project that did not come to fruition was a film starring Al Jolson.

RKO's owner Howard Hughes was impressed by The Narrow Margin and hired Fleischer to re-write and re-shoot the majority of His Kind of Woman (1952) after he was dissatisfied with the original cut delivered by director John Farrow. Hughes was pleased with the results and agreed to loan Fleischer to Stanley Kramer to make The Happy Time (1952).

=== Kramer Company ===
Fleischer was put under contract to the Kramer Company. The Happy Time was successful, and Fleischer was meant to follow it with another for Kramer and Foreman, Full of Life. However the film was never made because the partnership between Foreman and Kramer ended.

He accepted an offer from MGM to make Arena, a rodeo-themed story starring Gig Young and Jean Hagen.

=== Director of "A" films ===
Fleischer was chosen by Walt Disney – his father's former rival as a cartoon producer – to direct 20,000 Leagues Under the Sea (1954) starring Kirk Douglas. While in the film's post-production phase, Fleischer received an offer from Dore Schary at MGM to direct Bad Day at Black Rock, but had to turn it down because of the work still required on Leagues.

He directed Violent Saturday (1955), a thriller for Buddy Adler at 20th Century Fox. It was successful, and Fox signed Fleischer to a long-term contract. He worked for this studio for the next 15 years.

=== 20th Century Fox ===
Fleischer's first film under his new contract with Fox was The Girl in the Red Velvet Swing (1955). He then made Bandido, a Western with Robert Mitchum.

Kirk Douglas hired Fleischer to make The Vikings (1958), which was produced independently by Douglas through his company Brynaprod (and distributed through United Artists) and was another big hit. Back at Fox, Fleischer made Compulsion (1959), a crime drama with Orson Welles for producer Richard D. Zanuck. It was successful and earned Fleischer a Directors Guild Award nomination.

=== Europe ===
Fox offered him North to Alaska (1960) with John Wayne, which Fleischer originally agreed to do, but withdrew when he was unhappy with the script. He moved to Paris where Darryl F. Zanuck asked him to make The Ballad of Red Rocks, a vehicle for Zanuck's then-girlfriend Juliette Gréco. The film was not made, but Fleischer directed two other stories for Zanuck starring Gréco: Crack in the Mirror (1960) and The Big Gamble (1961).

Fleischer then signed a contract with Dino De Laurentiis to make Barabbas (1961). After this, he and De Laurentiis announced a series of projects, including Lanny Budd (from a novel by Upton Sinclair), Don Camillo, Salvatore Guliano, Dark Angel and Sacco and Vanzetti (from a script by Edward Anhalt), but none were made. He accepted an offer from Samuel Bronston and Philip Yordan to make The Nightrunners of Bengal in Spain, but this project fell apart when Bronston's empire collapsed.

=== Return to Hollywood ===
Back in Hollywood, Richard Zanuck had become head of production at Fox and offered Fleischer Fantastic Voyage (1966). It was a success and revived his Hollywood career.

He was entrusted with Fox's big "roadshow" musical of 1967, Doctor Dolittle (1967), with Rex Harrison. It failed to break even. Most acclaimed was The Boston Strangler (1968), with Tony Curtis.

Che! (1969), a biopic of Che Guevara that starred Omar Sharif, was an expensive flop, as was Tora! Tora! Tora! (1970), an account of the World War II Japanese attack on Pearl Harbor. It was his last film for 20th Century Fox.

=== 1970s ===
Fleischer traveled to England, where he directed the well received true-crime dramatization, 10 Rillington Place (1971) starring Richard Attenborough and John Hurt. He then replaced John Huston, who had fallen out with star George C. Scott, on The Last Run (1971). The thriller See No Evil (1971) with Mia Farrow followed. Returning to Hollywood, he made The New Centurions (1972) from the novel by Joseph Wambaugh, again starring George C. Scott.

At MGM, he made the science-fiction movie Soylent Green (1973), with Charlton Heston. Three action films followed: The Don Is Dead (1973), with Anthony Quinn, plus two for Walter Mirisch: The Spikes Gang (1974), with Lee Marvin, and Mr. Majestyk (1974), with Charles Bronson, written by Elmore Leonard.

Fleischer was reunited with De Laurentiis for the successful-though-controversial Mandingo (1975), a period drama set in the Antebellum South. The Incredible Sarah (1976), a British biopic of Sarah Bernhardt with Glenda Jackson, came next.

The Prince and the Pauper (1977) was a version of the Mark Twain novel that featured Heston, Harrison and Scott in its cast. Fleischer was hired to replace Richard Sarafian on Ashanti (1979), starring Michael Caine, which turned out to be a flop. He received another call to replace a director, in this case Sidney J. Furie, on The Jazz Singer (1980), an unsuccessful attempt to make a film star out of Neil Diamond.

=== Later career ===
Tough Enough (1983) was about the Toughman Contest starring Dennis Quaid. He made four more for De Laurentiis: Amityville 3-D (1983), Conan the Destroyer (1984) and Red Sonja (1985) — adaptations of Robert E. Howard's Hyborian Age stories, both starring Arnold Schwarzenegger — and his final theatrical feature Million Dollar Mystery (1987), an ensemble comedy inspired by It's a Mad, Mad, Mad, Mad World.

=== Fleischer Studios ===
Fleischer's 1993 autobiography Just Tell Me When to Cry, described his many difficulties with actors, writers and producers.

Fleischer was chairman of Fleischer Studios, which today handles the licensing of Betty Boop and Koko the Clown. In June 2005, he released his memoirs of his father's career in Out of the Inkwell: Max Fleischer and the Animation Revolution.

== Appraisal ==
Throughout his career, Fleischer earned a reputation as a reliable journeyman and "replacement director", filling in when a project's original director was fired by a producer for creative differences. His status as a journeyman was reflected in his own memoirs. His skill at managing large studio budgets and star vehicles was noted at the time, with Georges Sadoul writing:

"His work, though of varied quality, has been largely underestimated, perhaps because he had to work under the thumb of such highly individualistic producers as Stanley Kramer, Walt Disney, and Darry F. Zanuck. His virtuosity and skill are evident in The Vikings and even in 20,000 Leagues Under the Sea, despite their large budgets."

Some of Fleischer's films have undergone critical re-evaluation. Critic Robin Wood described Mandingo, which was critically panned on initial release, as "the greatest film about race ever made in Hollywood." Jonathan Rosenbaum wrote in 1985 that it was "One of the most neglected and underrated Hollywood films of its era." His early film noirs, particularly The Narrow Margin, have also been praised. James Monaco called it "one of the finest film noirs ever made."

Fleischer's true crime films have received a similarly positive re-appraisal. Dennis Schwartz highlights his innovative use of split screen techniques in The Boston Strangler. Japanese film director and critic Kiyoshi Kurosawa described it as one of his favorite films, referring to Fleischer's direction as "genius".

In 2023, Jack Hawkins of /Film listed 10 Rillington Place as one of the most underrated films of the 1970s. Andrew Male of BBC Culture wrote, "I think 10 Rillington Place is a masterpiece that I have no desire to ever revisit. I think it's so effective in conjuring up an atmosphere of evil and malaise that I find it far scarier than any so-called horror film I've ever seen."

== Personal life ==
Fleischer married Mary Dickson in 1946. The couple had three children.

=== Death ===
Fleischer died in 2006 at the Motion Picture and Television Country House and Hospital in Woodland Hills, Los Angeles, in his sleep of a respiratory infection at the age of 89.

== Filmography ==
=== Feature films ===
Year	Title	Notes
1946	Child of Divorce	
1947	Banjo	
1948	Bodyguard	
1948	So This Is New York	
1949	Trapped	
1949	Make Mine Laughs	
1949	Follow Me Quietly	
1949	The Clay Pigeon	
1950	Armored Car Robbery	
1951	His Kind of Woman	Uncredited; replaced John Farrow (Note: According to his book Just Tell Me When to Cry, executive producer Howard Hughes ordered extensive rewrites, recastings, and reshoots after the end of principal photography, and hired Fleischer to direct the new scenes. This process saw the majority of the film more or less completely remade in the span of 10 months, with only a small portion of original director Farrow's scenes remaining in the final film. Despite this, Farrow received sole directorial credit.)
1952	The Narrow Margin	
1952	The Happy Time	
1953	Arena	
1954	20,000 Leagues Under the Sea	
1955	Violent Saturday	
1955	The Girl in the Red Velvet Swing	
1956	Bandido	
1956	Between Heaven and Hell	
1958	The Vikings	
1959	These Thousand Hills	
1959	Compulsion	
1960	Crack in the Mirror	
1961	The Big Gamble	
1961	Barabbas	
1966	Fantastic Voyage	
1967	Doctor Dolittle	
1968	The Boston Strangler	
1969	Che!	
1970	Tora! Tora! Tora!	Co-directed with Toshio Masuda & Kinji Fukasaku
1971	See No Evil	
1971	The Last Run	Replaced John Huston
1971	10 Rillington Place	
1972	The New Centurions	
1973	Soylent Green	
1973	The Don Is Dead	
1974	Mr. Majestyk	
1974	The Spikes Gang	
1975	Mandingo	
1976	The Incredible Sarah	
1977	The Prince and the Pauper	
1979	Ashanti	Replaced Richard C. Sarafian
1980	The Jazz Singer	Replaced Sidney J. Furie
1982	Tough Enough	Replaced John Leone
1983	Amityville 3-D	
1984	Conan the Destroyer	
1985	Red Sonja	
1987	Million Dollar Mystery	

=== Short films ===
Year	Film	Notes
1943-48	Flicker Flashbacks	Compilation series
1947	Mr. Bell	
1967	Think Twentieth	Compilation film
1989	Call from Space	

=== Documentary works ===
Year	Title	Notes
1943	This Is America	Documentary series
1944	Memo for Joe	Documentary short
1947	Design for Death	

== Bibliography ==
- Fleischer, Richard, Just Tell Me When to Cry (Carroll and Graf, 1993)
- Fleischer, Richard, Out of the Inkwell: Max Fleischer and the Animation Revolution (University Press of Kentucky, 2005)

== Awards and honors ==
Institution	Year	Category	Work	Result
Academy Award	1947	Best Feature Documentary	Design for Death	Won
Avoriaz Fantastic Film Festival	1974	Grand Prize	Soylent Green	Won
BAFTA Film Award	1960	Best Film from any Source	Compulsion	Nominated
Cannes Film Festival	1959	Palme d'Or	Compulsion	Nominated
Golden Globe Award	1953	Best Director	The Happy Time	Nominated
Golden Raspberry Award	1981	Worst Director	The Jazz Singer	Nominated
Directors Guild of America Award	1959	Outstanding Directing – Feature Film	The Vikings	Nominated
Directors Guild of America Award	1960	Outstanding Directing – Feature Film	Compulsion	Nominated
Fantasporto	1986	International Fantasy Film Award for Best Film	Amityville 3-D	Nominated
Hugo Award	1966	Hugo Award for Best Dramatic Presentation	Fantastic Voyage	Nominated
Hugo Award	1973	Hugo Award for Best Dramatic Presentation	Soylent Green	Nominated
Saturn Award	1975	Best Science Fiction Film	Soylent Green	Won
Saturn Award	1995	Special Award (for career in film)	—N/a	Won
