= Let's Dance (1950 film) =

1950 film by Norman Z. McLeod

- Theatrical release poster
- Directed by: Norman Z. McLeod
- Screenplay by: Allan Scott; Dane Lussier (additional dialogue)
- Based on: "Little Boy Blue" (1948 story) by Maurice Zolotow
- Produced by: Robert Fellows
- Starring: Betty Hutton; Fred Astaire; Roland Young; Ruth Warwick
- Cinematography: George Barnes
- Edited by: Ellsworth Hoagland
- Music by: Robert Emmett Dolan
- Production company: Paramount Pictures
- Distributed by: Paramount Pictures
- Release dates: November 18, 1950 (Lansing); November 29, 1950 (New York City)
- Running time: 112 minutes
- Country: United States
- Language: English
- Box office: $2.4 million (US rentals)

Let's Dance is a 1950 American Technicolor musical romantic comedy-drama film directed by Norman Z. McLeod and starring Betty Hutton and Fred Astaire, with Roland Young, Ruth Warrick, Lucile Watson and Gregory Moffett. All music was composed by Frank Loesser. The film was produced and released by Paramount Pictures.

The film centers on a child custody battle between Katherine "Kitty" McNeil, played by Hutton and Serena Everett, played by Watson, over Kitty's six-year-old son, Richard "Richie" Everett the VII, played by Moffett. Kitty gets help in the custody battle from her old USO dancing partner, Donald "Don" Elwood, played by Astaire and her sister-in-law Carola Everett, played by Warrick.

== Plot ==
American performers Katherine "Kitty" McNeil and Donald "Don" Lockwood are performing for Allied soldiers in London in 1944. The two had a distant romantic relationship over the years, due to Don’s non-commitment. At the end of their performance, Don announces that they are getting engaged, surprising Kitty. Unbeknownst to Don, Kitty is already married to a wealthy Bostonian fighter pilot, Richard Everett. Backstage, Kitty informs Don of her engagement and the two split up their act. Soon after, Richard is shot down.

Six years later, a widowed Kitty is living with her husband's family in Boston. She has since had Richard's child, Richard "Richie" Everett the VII. Kitty’s grandmother-in-law, Serena, disapproves of Kitty’s parenting of Richie. Although Kitty has found sympathy in her sister-in-law, Carola, she feels looked down upon in the Everett household. Kitty decides to run away with Richie to New York City.

After the war, Don became an investment broker in New York City. He earns little, so he continues to perform at a local nightclub, Larry's. Upon leaving a cafe, Don notices and deliberately bumps into Kitty. They each share false stories of their success, but Kitty flees when she spots Serena's lawyers. Don follows her home and gets the truth out of her. He gets her a job at Larry's as a cigarette girl.

Serena’s lawyers arrive at the nightclub. They give Kitty the option of returning Richie to Serena or a subpoena. Kitty declines the offer so Serena takes her to court. Despite the evidence indicating that Richie is well cared for and educated by the staff of Larry's, the judge insists that unless Kitty earns a higher salary or marries within 60 days, Richie will be returned to Serena. Don spontaneously announces his proposal to Kitty in the courtroom, shocking her, but she accepts.

At the marriage licence office, Kitty and Don quarrel over his investment career. They decide to split up. Upon learning of their split, Carola offers Kitty her bankroll of $20,000, but Kitty refuses. Instead, Kitty romances Don's wealthy old college buddy, Timothy Bryant. Out of jealousy, Don begins seeing Carola.

Kitty and Timothy announce their engagement but Don convinces Timothy that Kitty is a gold digger. Timothy believes Don and breaks off the engagement. Sixty days pass, and Serena takes custody of Richie. The $20,000 that Carola offered Kitty she instead offers to Don to invest on behalf of the Everetts. Don purchases a racehorse which wins a race. A friend of Don's offers $50,000 for the horse, which Don accepts. With Carola's permission, he plans to use the $50,000 to help Kitty get Richie back.

Serena is charmed by Don and proposes he becomes the business partner of the Everetts. Meanwhile, Kitty sneaks into the Everett estate and takes Richie back. Don notices her and helps her escape from the house. Don declines Serena's offer and returns to Larry's. When Don arrives, he decides to give up investing and instead return to full-time dancing. When he tells Kitty, she agrees to marry him. Serena relinquishes custody of Richie and offers her country home to them, on the condition that she can visit at any time.

== Cast ==
- Betty Hutton as Katherine "Kitty" McNeil
- Fred Astaire as Donald "Don" Elwood
- Roland Young as Edmund Pohlwhistle
- Ruth Warrick as Carola Everett
- Lucile Watson as Serena Everett
- Gregory Moffett as Richard "Richie" Everett the VII
- Barton MacLane as Larry Channock
- Shepperd Strudwick as Timothy Bryant
- Melville Cooper as Charles Wagstaffe
- Harold Huber as Marcel
- George Zucco as Judge Mackenzie
- Nana Bryant as Mrs. Bryant
- Peggy Badley as Bubbles Malone
- Virginia Toland as Elsie

== Soundtrack ==
All songs in the film were composed by Frank Loesser. They are as follows:

- "Can't Stop Talking (About Him)" — Performed by Betty Hutton and Fred Astaire
- "Piano Dance" — Performed by Fred Astaire
- "Jack And The Beanstalk" — Performed by Fred Astaire
- "Oh, Them Dudes" — Performed by Betty Hutton and Fred Astaire
- "Why Fight The Feeling" — Performed by Betty Hutton
- "The Hyacinth" — Performed by Lucile Watson and Fred Astaire
- "Tunnel Of Love" — Performed by Betty Hutton and Fred Astaire

Hutton released a recording of "Can't Stop Talking (About Him)" on the B-side of RCA Victor 20-3908. Rosemary Clooney recorded “Why Fight The Feeling" on Columbia 38900. Clooney later sung "Why Fight The Feeling" on a television episode of her show "The Rosemary Clooney Show" (1956-57)

== Production ==
Following the great success that Metro-Goldwyn-Mayer found in teaming Astaire with its greatest female musical star Judy Garland in the 1948 musical Easter Parade, Paramount sought to team Astaire with its own leading female musical star, Betty Hutton. The studio purchased the rights to a magazine story titled "Little Boy Blue", written by Maurice Zolotow, as the basis for the screenplay. The film's early working title was also Little Boy Blue, but Paramount announced the title change to Let's Dance in May 1949.

Filming was slated to begin in June, 1949. Filming took place between July to September 1949, though many production numbers were worked on beforehand. Filming was rushed so Hutton could do Annie Get Your Gun for Metro-Goldwyn-Mayer. The film originally ran for nearly two and a half hours, with the screenplay often re-written on set. A number "Ming Toy" was recorded and shot, but was cut from the film. Moffett's sixth birthday was celebrated on set.

"Tunnel Of Love", sung by Hutton and Astaire in the film, was originally written by Loesser for the 1949 film, Neptune's Daughter. Jane Cowl was originally cast in the role of Serena Everett but was replaced by Watson due to an injury.

== Release and reception ==
=== Premiere ===
The film's premiere was made into a publicity event for the city of Lansing, Michigan by Paramount. The film premiered at the Michigan Theatre in Lansing on November 18th, 1950. The premiere was attended by Hutton and her mother, Mabel Mae Lum. It was marketed as a homecoming for Hutton as she had spent several years of her youth in Lansing. Upon their arrival in Lansing, they were greeted by Mayor Ralph Crego, who presented Hutton with a plaque on her old home that read "Betty Hutton Lived Here", erected by The Historical Society of Greater Lansing. Whilst in Lansing she opened the Annual Christmas drive of the local charity the Red Stocking club.

In New York City, the film premiered at the Paramount Theatre on November 29th, 1950 and was opened by Jimmy Dorsey and His Orchestra with the Nat King Cole Trio.

=== Reviews ===
In a contemporary review for The New York Times, critic Thomas M. Pryor called the screenplay "a curious mixture of comedy, farce and sentimentality that is stretched beyond the point of comfortable endurance" and wrote: "The trouble with 'Let's Dance' is that it is freighted with too much plot, and most of it wallows in cheap sentiment that is not smartly enough burlesqued to add up to hearty laughter."

Critic Philip K. Scheuer of the Los Angeles Times wrote: "Let's Dance has a plot so insistently complicated that its sole purpose appears to be to keep the stars out of the musical spotlight; and when they do manage to get into it the songs Frank Loesser has written for them seem hardly worth the effort."

=== Home media ===
The film was released on VHS by Paramount in 1989. Film distribution company Kino Lorber collaborated with Paramount for a Blu-ray release of the film. The Blu-ray was released on February 13th, 2024.
