= Trail Street =

1947 film by Ray Enright

- Theatrical release poster
- Directed by: Ray Enright
- Screenplay by: Norman Houston; Gene Lewis
- Based on: Golden Horizons; 1937 novel by William Corcoran
- Produced by: Nat Holt
- Starring: Randolph Scott; Robert Ryan; Anne Jeffreys; George "Gabby" Hayes
- Narrated by: Ray Collins
- Cinematography: J. Roy Hunt
- Edited by: Lyle Boyer
- Music by: Paul Sawtell
- Color process: Black and white
- Production company: RKO Radio Pictures
- Distributed by: RKO Radio Pictures
- Release date: February 19, 1947 (US)
- Running time: 84 minutes
- Country: United States
- Language: English

Trail Street is a 1947 American Western film directed by Ray Enright and starring Randolph Scott, Robert Ryan, Anne Jeffreys and George "Gabby" Hayes. Based on the novel Golden Horizons by William Corcoran, and a screenplay by Norman Houston and Gene Lewis, the film is about the legendary Bat Masterson who brings law and order to the town of Liberal, Kansas, and defends the local farmers against a murderous cattle baron. Filmed on location in Agoura, California, at the Andy Jauregui Ranch in Newhall, California, and at the Encino Ranch of RKO Pictures. The film made a profit of $365,000.

== Plot ==
The town of Liberal in southwestern Kansas needs the help of a lawman; so does the law-abiding land agent Allen Harper. Eager to help, stable keeper Billy Burns sends for his longtime friend, the legendary Bat Masterson.

Allen's sweetheart, Susan Pritchard, is pursued by Logan Maury, a corrupt cattle baron. Hired gun Lance Larkin, who works for Maury, beats up a farmer and has a fist fight with Harper until Bat arrives and throws Larkin in jail. Bat is appointed the town's marshal and appoints Billy as his deputy.

Ruby Stone, a saloon singer in love with Maury, tries to keep him away from good girl Susan. When a farmer is murdered, Allen is framed and faces a lynch mob. Ruby ends up betraying Maury who shoots her in the back. Maury's own men are offended by the death of Ruby and block his escape. Bat fires, killing Maury. Allen can now marry Susan, while the town makes Billy the new marshal as Bat rides away to become a journalist back East.

== Cast ==
- Randolph Scott as Bat Masterson
- Robert Ryan as Allen Harper
- Anne Jeffreys as Ruby Stone
- George "Gabby" Hayes as Billy Burns
- Madge Meredith as Susan Pritchett
- Steve Brodie as Logan Maury
- Billy House as Carmody
- Virginia Sale as Hannah
- Harry Woods as Lance Larkin
- Phil Warren as Slim
- Harry Harvey as Mayor
- Jason Robards, Sr. as Jason (as Jason Robards)

== Production ==
The screenplay for Trail Street was written by Norman Houston and Gene Lewis, based on a novel by William Corcoran that was published as a serial in Cosmopolitan under the title Trail Street. According to a news item in the Hollywood Reporter, Barbara Hale and Lawrence Tierney were originally cast in the leading roles.

According to the August 1946 edition of Hollywood Reporter, five hundred extras were hired for the fight scene between the farmers and the trail riders.

== Reception ==
In his 1947 review for The New York Times, Bosley Crowther wrote that Trail Street was "no better nor worse than most of the rest” of Westerns about Bat Masterson. Crowther continued:

It is just another pistol drama in which the good marshal, played by Randolph Scott, cleans out a nest of cowboy villains who are making life miserable on the Kansas farms. Everything takes place on schedule, including a pious romance between a farm agent, Robert Ryan, and a local girl, Madge Meredith. Even the routine introduction of "Gabby" Hayes for comedy relief is as cut and dried as a cowhide.

In his review, Mike Grost wrote that although the film was no masterpiece, Trail Street contains "fresh visual thinking" and shows "graceful mise-en-scène". Grost continued:

One shot shows hero Randolph Scott and friend walking down the side of a bustling Western street. Another follows a dance hall woman singer through a crowd, up the saloon staircase, and across the balcony, where she leans over to address the crowd below. Even when Enright is not moving his camera, many of the visuals have a kinetic quality. People are always moving into or out of the frame. Their motions are graceful and vivid. There is a long sequence of various couples in the plot dancing at a fete. Even Robert Ryan, who I do not think of as the ballroom dancing type, has a rhythmic outing with his girlfriend here. ... Another notable sequence: when Scott rescues the old farmers that had been tied up by bad guys. This sequence ends with an architecturally striking shot. It looks much different from anything I've seen in a Western before. Some fresh visual thinking is at work here.

== See also ==
- Bat Masterson
