= My Pal Wolf =

1944 film directed by Alfred L. Werker

- Directed by: Alfred L. Werker; Fred Fleck (assistant)
- Screenplay by: Lillie Hayward; Leonard Praskins; John Paxton
- Story by: Frederick Hazlitt Brennan
- Produced by: Adrian Scott
- Starring: Sharyn Moffett; Jill Esmond; George Cleveland; Charles Arnt; Una O'Connor; Claire Carleton
- Cinematography: Jack MacKenzie
- Edited by: Harry Marker
- Music by: C. Bakaleinikoff
- Production company: RKO Radio Pictures
- Distributed by: RKO Radio Pictures
- Release date: October 8, 1944 (United States)
- Running time: 74 minutes
- Country: United States
- Language: English
- Budget: $230,000 (approx)

My Pal Wolf is a 1944 American drama film directed by Alfred L. Werker from a screenplay by Lillie Hayward, Leonard Praskins and John Paxton based on a story by Frederick Hazlitt Brennan. Produced and distributed by RKO Radio Pictures, the film was released on October 8, 1944. The film stars Sharyn Moffett (in her film debut), Jill Esmond, Una O'Connor, George Cleveland, Charles Arnt and Claire Carleton. The picture also marked the debut of producer Adrian Scott, a communist who would later become a member of the Hollywood Ten.

== Plot ==
A young girl named Gretchen befriends an AWOL army German Shepherd dog, naming him Wolf. When she takes Wolf home, her strict governess notifies the army, who comes to claim him. Wolf escapes from the army training camp and finds his way back to Gretchen. She and her friends travel to Washington to ask the Secretary of War for the dog, but to no avail. In the end, she is given a puppy to replace Wolf.

== Cast ==
- Sharyn Moffett as Gretchen Anstey
- Jill Esmond as Miss Elizabeth Munn
- Una O'Connor as Mrs. Blevin
- George Cleveland as Wilson
- Charles Arnt as Papa Eisdaar
- Claire Carleton as Ruby
- Leona Maricle as Mrs. Priscilla Anstey
- Bruce Edwards as Mr. Paul Anstey
- Edward Fielding as Secretary of War
- Olga Fabian as Mama Eisdaar
