= The Judge Steps Out =

1949 film by Boris Ingster

- Theatrical release poster
- Directed by: Boris Ingster
- Screenplay by: Boris Ingster; Alexander Knox
- Story by: Boris Ingster
- Produced by: Michael Kraike
- Starring: Alexander Knox; Ann Sothern; George Tobias; Sharyn Moffett; Florence Bates; Frieda Inescort; Myrna Dell
- Cinematography: Robert De Grasse
- Edited by: Les Millbrook
- Music by: Leigh Harline
- Production company: RKO Pictures
- Distributed by: RKO Pictures
- Release dates: February 1, 1948 (London): June 2, 1949; (US)
- Running time: 91 minutes
- Country: United States
- Language: English

The Judge Steps Out is a 1948 American comedy film directed by Boris Ingster and written by Ingster and Alexander Knox. The film stars Knox and Ann Sothern, along with George Tobias, Sharyn Moffett, Florence Bates, Frieda Inescort and Myrna Dell. The film was completed in March 1947, but its American release was held up until June 2, 1949, by RKO Pictures. The film was retitled Indian Summer in Great Britain and the Commonwealth.

== Plot ==
Thomas Bailey is bored with his job as a probate judge in Boston and appears to be just going through the motions as he decides against a mother in a custody case in favor of the child’s more conservative grandfather. At home, he’s a milquetoast to his self-centered and domineering wife Evelyn, who appears to despise her husband for his lack of ambition. She tries to get him a position as a Washington lobbyist for a large industrial company. Tom agrees to go to Washington to check things out. While on the train he develops what appears to be an ulcer and stops at a small town where the local doctor prescribes a break from everything, both family and business.

Tom takes some time out to go fishing, forgetting to send a telegram to his wife. Feeling guilty about this short respite, he returns home to overhear his wife speaking disparagingly about him to her friends. He slips out of the house unnoticed and, after weeks of travelling across the country, finds a job as a short-order cook at a roadside cafe in California run by a woman called Peggy (Ann Sothern).

Tom is happy in his new life, and he and Peggy fall in love. However Peggy is trying to adopt a girl, Nan, and is struggling with the legal process. Tom tries to help with adoption papers, but Peggy is rejected. Tom realizes that the courts are prejudiced against Peggy, partly because she is unmarried and has a man living in her restaurant/residence. Moreover, he realizes that he himself was prejudiced in his decision against the woman at the beginning of the movie. He perfunctorily handed over the woman’s child to her grandfather simply because he was rich and had gone to Harvard.

Tom returns to Boston to resolve this miscarriage of justice, and succeeds with both. While appealing the case to the Appellate court he is offered a seat on the bench. He declines this as he wishes to return to California, Peggy and Nan. Planning to end things with Evelyn, he finds she has changed. She is now less self-centred; more empathetic and almost loving towards Tom.

Despite Evelyn's sadness, Tom prepares to return to California. He arrives at the train station but realizes that he loves the law, and that running off to California is only a childish dream. Unexpectedly, Peggy shows up at the station and, in a brief exchange, they explain how they have each found happiness; Peggy with Nan, and Tom in Boston. Tom gives his ticket to Peggy for her to return to California, and they part affectionately. Tom watches the train leave, and returns to his home.

== Cast ==
- Alexander Knox as Judge Thomas Bailey
- Ann Sothern as Peggy
- George Tobias as Mike
- Sharyn Moffett as Nan
- Florence Bates as Chita
- Frieda Inescort as Evelyn Bailey
- Myrna Dell as Mrs. Joan Winthrop
- Ian Wolfe as Hector Brown
- H. B. Warner as Chief Justice Hayes
- Martha Hyer as Catherine Bailey Struthers III
- James Warren as John Struthers III
- Whitford Kane as Dr. Charles P. Boyd
- Harry Hayden as Judge Davis
- Anita Sharp-Bolster as Martha, the Maid

== Reception ==
The film recorded a loss of $650,000.
