= China Smith =

1952 American TV series

- Written by: Robert C. Dennis; Jack Laird
- Directed by: Gene Fowler Jr. Leslie Goodwins
- Starring: Dan Duryea; Douglass Dumbrille; Myrna Dell; Clarence Lung
- Country of origin: United States
- Original language: English

Production
- Running time: 30 minutes
- Production company: National Telefilm Associates

Original release
- Network: First-run syndication
- Release: June 1, 1952 – January 1, 1955

China Smith is a 30-minute American syndicated television adventure series starring Dan Duryea. It is set in Singapore. It was released in the fall of 1952. The program's alternate title was The Affairs of China Smith, and the last 26 episodes were syndicated with the title The New Adventures of China Smith.

The series' pilot was shown as Souvenir from Singapore, an episode of Schlitz Playhouse of Stars aired on June 6, 1952.

== Premise ==
The title character was a soldier of fortune, "an opportunistic con artist and sometimes private eye" who sought adventure. Episodes had Smith confronting characters who ranged from Communists to "bigger crooks than he was." He often helped people who were innocent but somehow were entangled with villains. The other regular characters were a madam who helped Smith and a chief of police who sometimes helped and sometimes interfered.

In 1959 Daffy Duck played China Jones, a parody of Duryea's character.

== Cast ==
- Dan Duryea as China Smith
- Douglass Dumbrille as Inspector Hobson
- Myrna Dell as Shira
- Clarence Lung as Johnny Fung

Much of the cast and crew also worked on the film World for Ransom, which is considered an extension of the television program.

== Production ==
Bernard Tabakin was the producer. Arthur Pierson was the director, with Robert Aldrich directing two episodes. Robert C. Dennis was the writer.

The series was made with a two-year gap; the first 26 episodes being filmed in Mexico in 1952, the second 26 episodes were shot in 1954-1955 in San Francisco and Los Angeles. The change occurred after the American Federation of Television and Radio Artists (AFTRA) complained that the productions in Mexico deprived AFTRA members of work. Divisions of the International Alliance of Theatrical Stage Employees (IATSE) and the American Federation of Labor (AFL) also protested the Mexican filming. Roy Brewer, who was chair of the AFL's Hollywood Film Council and representative of the West Coast IATSE, complained to Thrifty Drug Stores, which sponsored the show on KECA-TV, resulting in the company's withdrawal of the six Mexican-filmed episodes from the station. Tabakin was removed from the council's "'unfair' list" after he agreed to limit production of TV shows to the United States.

Production of the show was stopped in April 1954 by the Screen Actors Guild's (SAG) cancellation of the contract that it had with producer Tableau Television, Limited (TT). SAG charged that TT had not met the contract's requirements for royalty payments to actors.

China Smith was financed and distributed by Proktor Syndication International (PSI-TV).

== Episode list ==
| No. | Title | Directed by | Written by | Original release date |
|---|---|---|---|---|
| 1 | "The Bamboo Coffin" | Arthur Pierson | Robert C. Dennis | TBA |
| 2 | "Celestial Pebbles" | Arthur Pierson | Robert C. Dennis | TBA |
| 3 | "The Corpse With The Purple Ear" | Arthur Pierson | Robert C. Dennis | TBA |
| 4 | "Cruise To Colombo" | Arthur Pierson | Story by : Lindsay Hardy; Teleplay by : Robert C. Dennis | TBA |
| 5 | "Curse Of The River Gods" | TBA | TBA | TBA |
| 6 | "Devil-In-The-Godown" | Edward Mann | Robert C. Dennis | 1952 |
| 7 | "Dynasty Of The Dead" | TBD | Robert C. Dennis | 1952 |
| 8 | "Espionage Express" | TBA | TBA | TBA |
| 9 | "High Sea" | Arthur Pierson | Robert C. Dennis | TBA |
| 10 | "The Jade Trap" | TBA | TBA | TBA |
| 11 | "Jungle Dragon" | Arthur Pierson | Robert C. Dennis | TBA |
| 12 | "The Kaprielian Cipher" | Arthur Pierson | Robert C. Dennis | TBA |
| 13 | "Killer In The Kampong" | Arthur Pierson | Robert C. Dennis | TBA |
| 14 | "Kris Of Death" | Edward Mann | Robert C. Dennis | TBA |
| 15 | "Moon Flower" | TBD | Robert C. Dennis | 1952 |
| 16 | "My Ship Has A Golden Keel" | TBD | Robert C. Dennis | 1952 |
| 17 | "Pagoda In The Jungle" | Arthur Pierson | Robert C. Dennis | 1952 |
| 18 | "The Phantom Sampan" | Arthur Pierson | Robert C. Dennis | TBA |
| 19 | "Port Of Thieves" | TBD | Robert C. Dennis | 1952 |
| 20 | "Shanghai Clipper" | Robert Aldrich | Robert C. Dennis | 1952 |
| 21 | "Straight Settlement" | Robert Aldrich | Story by : Robert C. Dennis; Teleplay by : Lindsay Hardy | TBA |
| 22 | "The Tanaka Archive" | TBD | Robert C. Dennis | 1952 |
| 23 | "The Wondrous Funeral Of Sergeant Ko" | TBD | Robert C. Dennis | 1952 |
| 24 | "Wreath Of Poppies" | TBD | Robert C. Dennis | 1952 |
| 25 | "The Year Of The Phoenix" | Arthur Pierson | Robert C. Dennis | 1952 |
| 26 | "Zorana The Destroyer" | TBD | Robert C. Dennis | 1952 |
