= Arizona Whirlwind =

1944 film

- Theatrical release poster
- Directed by: Robert Emmett Tansey
- Music by: Frank Sanucci
- Distributed by: Monogram Pictures
- Release date: 1944
- Running time: 59 minutes
- Country: United States
- Language: English

Arizona Whirlwind is a 1944 American Western film directed by Robert Emmett Tansey. It stars Ken Maynard, Hoot Gibson, and Bob Steele.

== Cast ==
- Ken Maynard as U.S. Marshal
- Hoot Gibson as U.S. Marshal
- Bob Steele as himself
- Ian Keith as Polini
- Ernie Adams as Warren, the Jewel Cutter
- Myrna Dell as Ruth Hampton
- Karl Hackett as Banker Steve Lynch
- Charles King as Henchman Duke Rollins
- Don Stewart as Donny Davis
- Bud Osborne as Henchman

== See also ==
- Hoot Gibson filmography
- Bob Steele filmography
- List of American films of 1944
