= Even as IOU =

1942 American short film by Del Lord

- Directed by: Del Lord
- Written by: Felix Adler
- Produced by: Del Lord; Hugh McCollum
- Starring: Moe Howard; Larry Fine; Curly Howard; Stanley Blystone; Ruth Skinner; Sharyn Moffett; Vernon Dent; Bud Jamison
- Cinematography: L. William O'Connell
- Edited by: Paul Borofsky
- Distributed by: Columbia Pictures
- Release date: September 18, 1942 (U.S.)
- Running time: 15:37
- Country: United States
- Language: English

Even as IOU is a 1942 short subject directed by Del Lord starring American slapstick comedy team The Three Stooges (Moe Howard, Larry Fine and Curly Howard). It is the 65th entry in the series released by Columbia Pictures starring the comedians, who released 190 shorts for the studio between 1934 and 1959.

== Plot ==
The Stooges are street peddlars of expired racing forms to unsuspecting patrons. When a disgruntled customer alerts a passing police officer, the trio makes a hasty exit. They pose as mannequins outside a clothing store until the officer discovers their ruse, prompting them to flee once more.

Amidst their flight, they encounter a destitute mother and her daughter whom they assist by securing milk for the child. Curly then appropriates the little girl's piggy bank with the intention of betting on a horse race. Following an unexpected triumph in the race, their newfound prosperity is short-lived as they fall victim to the machinations of two swindlers, who use ventriloquism to deceive them into purchasing a supposedly talking racehorse named Seabasket.

The Stooges assume responsibility for the care of the aged horse, which results in a complication when Curly inadvertently ingests a Vitamin Z pill intended for the equine. Miraculously, this mishap results in Curly's ostensible birthing of a foal, subsequently heralded as a promising racehorse.

== Cast ==
=== Credited ===
- Moe Howard as Moe
- Larry Fine as Larry
- Curly Howard as Curly
- Ruth Skinner as Mrs. Blake
- Stanley Blystone as Joe, ventriloquist

=== Uncredited ===
- Vernon Dent as Man in car
- Bud Jamison as Cop
- Jerry Frank as Man posing as mannequin
- Sharyn Moffett as Mrs. Blake's daughter
- Heinie Conklin as Turnstile guard
- Jack Gardner as Bud, ventriloquist's pal
- Billy Bletcher as Ventriloquist's voice
- Suzanne Ridgeway as Woman at racetrack
- Lew Davis as Race announcer voice
- Bert Young as Betting window clerk
- Wheaton Chambers as Dr. O. B. Stretrick
- Joe Garcio as Vet assistant

== Production notes ==
Filming of Even as IOU was completed April 18–22, 1942.

There are several references to The New Deal instituted by President Franklin D. Roosevelt:

- Curly's "FBI Loan" is a malapropism pertaining to an FHA insured loan (Federal Housing Administration).
- Curly describes his taking the child's piggy bank as "only a lend-lease" referring to the Lend-Lease Law passed by Congress in 1941.

The idea of Curly swallowing Vitamin Z and hatching a colt generates from the use of synthetic vitamins as dietary supplements, which was both popular and experimental in the early 1940s.

Moe requests an operator patch him through to "Ripley, yeah, believe it or not." This is one of the earliest mentions of Ripley's in popular media.

The "ma-ma" doll gag had recently been used by Laurel and Hardy in 1940's Saps at Sea. It would be used again in the Stooges' 1951 short Scrambled Brains.
