= Here Come the Marines =

1952 film by William Beaudine

- Directed by: William Beaudine
- Written by: Tim Ryan; Charles R. Marion; Charles Crutcher
- Produced by: Jerry Thomas
- Starring: Leo Gorcey; Huntz Hall; David Gorcey; Bernard Gorcey
- Cinematography: Marcel LePicard
- Edited by: William Austin
- Music by: Edward J. Kay
- Production company: Monogram Pictures
- Distributed by: Monogram Pictures
- Release date: June 29, 1952
- Running time: 66 minutes
- Country: United States
- Language: English

Here Come the Marines is a 1952 American comedy film directed by William Beaudine and starring the Bowery Boys. The film was released on June 29, 1952 by Monogram Pictures and is the 26th film in the Bowery Boys series.

The film was released under the title of Tell It to the Marines in the United Kingdom.

== Plot ==
After Slip is drafted into the Marines, the rest of the gang follow him. Sach finds trouble, first for impersonating a doctor and then, while serving KP duty, creating a bouillon capable of melting any known metal. When he is called into the colonel's office for punishment, Sach discovers that his father Horace "Hard Head" Debussey Sr. served with the colonel in World War I, and Sach is promoted to the rank of sergeant.

Sach draws the ire of his men through multiple drills and with his persistent whistle. During a march, they find a soldier left for dead on the side of the road. Slip discovers a playing card next to the soldier and traces it to Jolly Joe Johnson's gambling house. They visit the casino and suspect that it is cheating after they lose all of their money. Back on base, the boys attempt to have Sach demoted by slipping an inert training bomb into his bed at night, hoping that he will cause a ruckus and be punished. The MPs arrive with a captain who scolds Sach for not recognizing a dud and then tosses the bomb outside, where it explodes. Sach is awarded a medal for heroism and promoted to the rank of staff sergeant. He is later promoted to the rank of technical sergeant for leading the men during a field exercise.

Several days later, the boys enter the closed gambling house at night and are discovered by Jolly Joe and his gang. A fight ensues, but two Marine intelligence officers arrive in time to arrest the criminals.

== Cast ==
=== The Bowery Boys ===
- Leo Gorcey as Terrance Aloysius "Slip" Mahoney
- Huntz Hall as Horace Debussy"'Sach" Jones
- David Gorcey as Chuck (as David Condon)
- Bennie Bartlett as Butch
- Gil Stratton Jr. as Junior

=== Remaining cast ===
- Bernard Gorcey as Louie Dumbrowski
- Hanley Stafford as Capt. Tom Brown
- Arthur Space as Capt. Miller
- Myrna Dell as Lulu Mae
- Riley Hill as Capt. Harlow

The film marks the final appearance of Stratton Jr. as a member of the gang.

== Home media ==
Warner Archives released the film on made-to-order DVD in the United States as part of The Bowery Boys, Volume Four set on August 26, 2014.

Preceded by Hold That Line; 1952	'The Bowery Boys' movies 1946-1958	Succeeded by Feudin' Fools; 1952
