= Sharyn Moffett =

American child actress (1936–2021)

- Moffett in 1948
- Born: Patricia Sharyn Moffett; September 12, 1936; Alameda, California, U.S.
- Died: December 23, 2021 (aged 85); Pittsburgh, Pennsylvania, U.S.
- Occupation: Actress
- Years active: 1944–1951
- Spouse: James Forrest (1955 - 2011, his death)
- Children: 3
- Relatives: Gregory Moffett (brother)

Patricia Sharyn Moffett (September 12, 1936 – December 23, 2021) was an American child actress who appeared in films during the 1940s.

== Life and career ==
Moffett was born in Alameda, California, on September 12, 1936, to a show business family. Her parents were singer R.E. Moffett and dancer Gladyce Lloyd Roberts. Her younger brother, Gregory Moffett, was also a child actor.

At the age of 11 months, Moffett appeared in In Old Chicago for 20th Century Fox. When she was four, her parents moved to Beverly Hills, California to explore her potential as a movie actress. By age five, she had appeared in the 1942 Three Stooges short film Even as IOU as a daughter whose family was dispossessed. At age seven, she had her feature-screen debut playing the lead in the film My Pal Wolf (1944). In 1944, she signed a seven-year contract with RKO Pictures.

Overall, she appeared in a dozen films, including The Body Snatcher (1945), the film noir The Locket (1946), Child of Divorce (1946), Banjo (1947), and Mr. Blandings Builds His Dream House (1948). In her later years, she made occasional appearances at conventions and film festivals.

In 1955, Moffett married minister James Forrest and ministered with him in churches for more than 50 years. They had three children. He died in 2011. She died in Pittsburgh, Pennsylvania, on December 23, 2021, at the age of 85.

== Filmography ==
Year	Title	Role
1938	In Old Chicago	
1942	Even as IOU	Mrs. Blake's daughter
1944	My Pal Wolf	Gretchen Anstey
1945	The Body Snatcher	Georgina Marsh
1945	The Falcon in San Francisco	Annie Marshall
1946	A Boy, a Girl and a Dog	Button
1946	Child of Divorce	Roberta Carter
1946	The Locket	Nancy, age 10
1947	Banjo	Pat Warren
1948	The Judge Steps Out	Nan
1948	Mr. Blandings Builds His Dream House	Joan Blandings
1948	Rusty Leads the Way	Penny Waters
1951	Her First Romance	Leona Dean
