= Edith Ostlere =

British actress and writer (1871–1931)

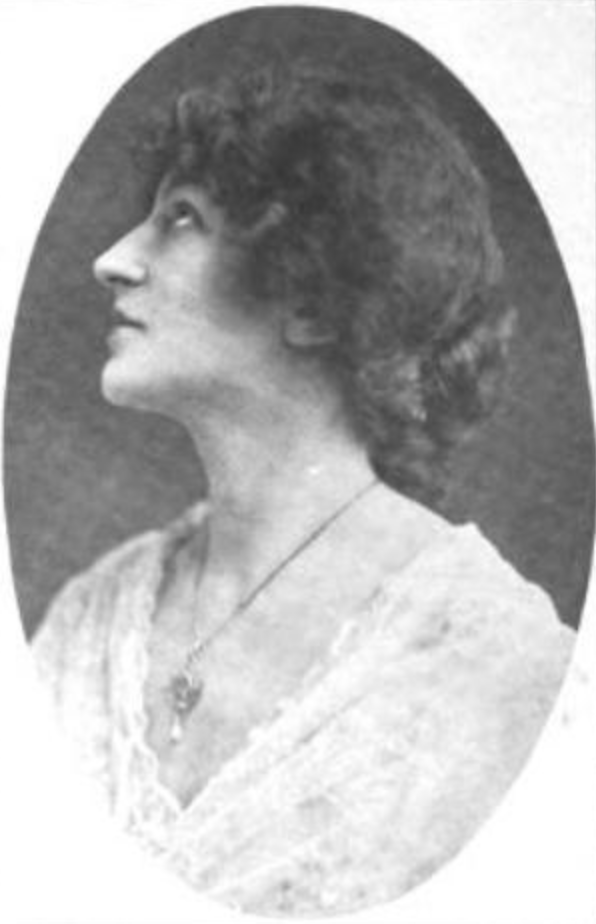
- Edith Ostlere, from a 1908 publication
- Born: Edith Elizabeth Bury; 12 August 1871; Surbiton, Surrey, England, U.K.
- Died: 12 September 1931 (aged 60); London, England, U.K.
- Other names: Robert Ord (pseudonym), Edith Lapthorne, Edith Gayer Mackay
- Occupations: Actress, playwright
- Spouse: W. Gayer Mackay

Edith Elizabeth Bury Gayer Mackay (12 August 1871 – 12 September 1931), known as Edith Ostlere, was a British actress, writer, and playwright. She used the pseudonym Robert Ord.

== Career ==
Ostlere's stage credits in Great Britain included roles in The Double Marriage (1888), Paul Kauvar (1894), A Gaiety Girl (1895), One of the Best (1895–1896), A Bunch of Violets (1896–1897), The Seats of the Mighty (1896–1897), The Baron's Wager (1897), More than Ever (1897), The King's Outcast (1899), The Man in the Iron Mask (1899) Kenyon's Widow, The Squire, A Fool's Paradise, and Dr. Wake's Patient (1905–1906).

Ostlere was also a writer. She wrote short stories, contributed a chapter to a collaborative novel in 1892, and co-wrote a time-travel story, "The Heat Wave" (1929). Using her pseudonym Robert Ord, she co-wrote several plays, including Dr. Wake's Patient (1904), Barry Doyle's Rest Cure (1907), The Port Arms (1909), A Midnight Visitor (1911), A Thief (1914), and The Prize (1915), and co-adapted Gertrude Page's novel Paddy the Next Best Thing (1908) for the stage, with her husband, W. Gayer Mackay.

== Works ==
- A 'Novel' Novel: A Strange Story. Twenty Chapters by Twenty Authors (1892, contributor)
- From Seven Dials (1898, short stories)
- "The Perfidious Frenchman" (1902, short story)
- Dr. Wake's Patient (1904, play, with W. Gayer Mackay)
- The Knees of the Gods (1905, one-act play)
- The Port Arms (1909, play, with W. Gayer Mackay)
- A Midnight Visitor (1911, play, with W. Gayer Mackay)
- A Thief (1914, play, with W. Gayer Mackay)
- The Prize (1915, play, with W. Gayer Mackay)
- "The Heat Wave: A Strange Story of Ancient Rome and Modern New York" (1929, story, with Marion Ryan)

== Personal life ==
Ostlere was born Edith Elizabeth Bury in Surbiton, Surrey, the daughter of Henry Cox Bury and Catherine Blanche Mousley Bury. She married actor William Thomas Lapthorne in 1891. They separated in 1897, and divorced in 1906. She married her writing partner, actor and playwright William Gayer Starbuck Mackay, in July 1907. He died in 1920, and she died in 1931, in her sixties, in London.
