= Sunset Pass (1933 film) =

1933 film by Henry Hathaway

- Directed by: Henry Hathaway
- Starring: Randolph Scott; Tom Keene; Harry Carey; Noah Beery, Sr.
- Release date: May 26, 1933
- Running time: 61 minutes
- Country: United States
- Language: English

Sunset Pass is a 1933 American pre-Code Western film directed by Henry Hathaway and starring Randolph Scott, Tom Keene, Harry Carey, and Noah Beery. The picture was based on a Zane Grey novel, along with several other theatrical films with similar casts (including Randolph Scott, Harry Carey and Noah Beery) also based upon Zane Grey novels directed by Hathaway in 1933.

== Plot ==
Government agent Jack Rock goes undercover to infiltrate a gang of rustlers hiding out at the Half Moon Ranch.

== Cast ==
- Randolph Scott as Ash Preshton
- Tom Keene as Jack Rock/Jim Collins
- Kathleen Burke as Jane Preston
- Harry Carey as John Hesbitt
- Noah Beery, Sr. as Marshal Blake
- Kent Taylor as Clink Peeples
- George Barbier as Judge

== Original 1929 version ==
Sunset Pass was a remake of a lost 1929 version directed by Otto Brower and starring Jack Holt, Nora Lane, and John Loder.

== 1946 remake ==
A second remake was released on October 1, 1946, starring James Warren as "Rocky" and Nan Leslie as Jane Preston.
