= Wanderer of the Wasteland =

Wanderer of the Wasteland may refer to:

- Wanderer of the Wasteland (novel), a 1923 novel by Zane Grey, and its film adaptations:
  - Wanderer of the Wasteland (1924 film)
  - Wanderer of the Wasteland (1935 film), starring Dean Jagger
  - Wanderer of the Wasteland (1945 film)
