= 99 River Street =

1953 film noir directed by Phil Karlson

- theatrical release poster
- Directed by: Phil Karlson
- Screenplay by: Robert Smith
- Story by: George Zuckerman
- Based on: "Crosstown" (short story, in Cosmopolitan, October 1945) by George Zuckerman
- Produced by: Edward Small
- Starring: John Payne; Evelyn Keyes
- Cinematography: Franz Planer
- Edited by: Buddy Small
- Music by: Arthur Lange; Emil Newman
- Production company: World Films (Edward Small Productions)
- Distributed by: United Artists
- Release dates: August 21, 1953 (LA); October 2, 1953 (NYC); October 3, 1953 (U.S.)
- Running time: 82-83 minutes
- Country: United States
- Language: English

99 River Street is a 1953 film noir directed by Phil Karlson and starring John Payne and Evelyn Keyes. It also features Brad Dexter, Frank Faylen and Peggie Castle. The screenplay is by Robert Smith based on a short story by George Zuckerman. The film was produced by Edward Small, with cinematography by Franz Planer.

== Plot ==
Ernie Driscoll is a New York taxi driver and former boxer who retired from the ring after sustaining a severe injury. His unhappy wife Pauline is having an affair with well-heeled jewel thief Victor Rawlins. An arrangement that Rawlins made for a batch of stolen diamonds is scuttled, and his fence indicates that Pauline's presence impeded the deal. Trying to save the deal, Rawlins kills Pauline and attempts to frame Driscoll for the murder. With the help of a female acquaintance, Driscoll tries to find Rawlins before he can escape the country.

== Cast ==
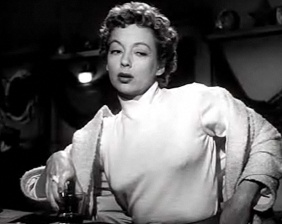
Evelyn Keyes in the film's trailer

- John Payne as Ernie Driscoll
- Evelyn Keyes as Linda James
- Brad Dexter as Victor Rawlins
- Frank Faylen as Stan Hogan
- Peggie Castle as Pauline Driscoll
- Jay Adler as Christopher
- Jack Lambert as Mickey
- Glenn Langan as Lloyd Morgan
- Eddy Waller as Pop Durkee
- John Day as Bud
- Ian Wolfe as Waldo Daggett
- Peter Leeds as Nat Finley
- William Tannen as director
- Gene Reynolds as Chuck
- Paul Bryar as Bartender

== Production ==
The rights to George Zuckerman's short story "Crosstown" were originally purchased by producer Albert Zugsmith, who sold them to Edward Small. In keeping with the source story, the film was originally known as Crosstown, but the title was changed two months before the film's release.

Linda Darnell was Small's first choice to play the female lead, a role that was awarded to Evelyn Keyes.

== Reception ==
Critic Oscar Godbout of The New York Times called 99 River Street "one of those tasteless melodramas peopled with unpleasant hoods, two-timing blondes and lots of sequences of what purports to be everyday life in the underworld" and wrote: "To say that this film is offensive would be kind; to point out that it induces an irritated boredom would be accurate. The defendants in this artistic felony are Robert Smith, the scenarist, and Phil Karlson, the director. It is interesting to ponder how Mr. Karlson managed to slip some objectionable scenes past the production code. Maybe it was just artistic license."

In its review of the film, the Los Angeles Times wrote: "It's as plotty as a comic-strip serial ... And so action-thick that sometimes the actors seem to stumble over the plot. Also the tale follows the modern pattern of having the hero suffer and suffer while the heroine follows along to pick up the pieces and do the rescuing."
