= Robert Barrat =

American actor (1889–1970)

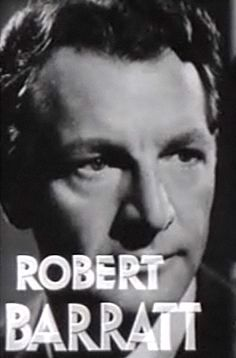
- Trailer for The Firebird (1934)
- Born: Robert Harriot Barrat; July 10, 1891; New York City, U.S.
- Died: January 7, 1970 (aged 78); Los Angeles, California, U.S.
- Resting place: Green Hill Cemetery, Martinsburg, West Virginia, U.S.
- Occupation: Actor
- Years active: 1915–1964
- Spouse: Mary Dean (m. 1966)

Robert Harriot Barrat (July 10, 1891 – January 7, 1970) was an American stage, motion picture, and television character actor.

== Early years ==
Barratt was born on July 10, 1891 in New York City, and educated in the public schools there. He left college and home during his sophomore year, traveling on a tramp steamer to Central America, England, France, and South America. After he returned to the United States, he worked for two years on his brother's farm near Springfield, Massachusetts, until he learned of an opening in the chorus for a musical comedy.

== Career ==
Early in his career, Barrat traveled around the United States, sometimes acting with stock theater companies and sometimes performing in vaudeville on the Keith and Orpheum circuits. Returning to New York City, he had a role in The Weavers at the Garden Theatre.

Barrat acted on Broadway, where his credits include Lilly Turner (1932), Bulls, Bears and Asses (1931), This Is New York (1930), Judas (1929), The Lady Lies (1928), A Lady for a Night (1927), Marco Millions (1928), Chicago (1926), Kid Boots (1923), The Breaking Point (1923), The Unwritten Chapter (1920), The Crimson Alibi (1919), The Invisible Foe (1918), and Some One in the House (1918).

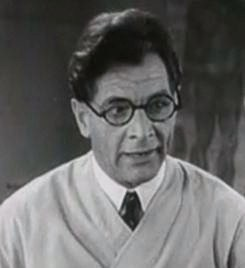
Barrat in A Very Honorable Guy (1934)

Barrat appeared in around 150 films, uncredited in some of them, in a Hollywood career that lasted four decades. He appeared in seven pictures with James Cagney during the 1930s. He played Nick, the sexually abusive father of Barbara Stanwyck's character, Lily, in the Pre-Code classic Baby Face.

Three of Barrat's best known roles were as the murder victim Archer Coe in Michael Curtiz's The Kennel Murder Case (1933), as the treacherous Major Ferdinand Walsin Esterhazy in the 1937 Academy Award-winning film The Life of Emile Zola and the crooked saloon owner "Red" Baxter in the Marx Brothers western comedy Go West (1940). Barrat portrayed several historical characters, among them Davy Crockett in Man of Conquest, Zachary Taylor in Distant Drums, Abraham Lincoln in Trailin' West, Cornelius Van Horne in Canadian Pacific and General Douglas MacArthur twice, in They Were Expendable and American Guerrilla in the Philippines.

In the mid-1950s, Barrat transitioned to television roles. His final acting appearance was in an episode of The Alfred Hitchcock Hour in 1964.

== Death ==
He died of a heart ailment in Hollywood in 1970, aged 78. He was survived by his wife, Mary Dean. He was buried at Green Hill Cemetery, Martinsburg, West Virginia.

== Complete filmography ==
- Her Own Way (1915) - Lt. Richard Coleman
- The Wonder Man (1920) - Alan Gardner
- Whispering Shadows (1921) - Hugh Brook
- Honor Among Lovers (1931) - Detective (uncredited)
- The Wiser Sex (1932) - Plainclothesman (uncredited)
- Pack Up Your Troubles (1932) - Detective (uncredited)
- King of the Jungle (1933) - Joe Nolan
- The Mind Reader (1933) - Detective (uncredited)
- Picture Snatcher (1933) - Grover
- Lilly Turner (1933) - Fritz 'Heinie'
- The Life of Jimmy Dolan (1933) - Sheriff (uncredited)
- Ann Carver's Profession (1933) - Andrew Simmons - Attorney (uncredited)
- The Silk Express (1933) - Mr. Calhoun, Attorney
- Heroes for Sale (1933) - Max
- The Mayor of Hell (1933) - Fred Smith
- Baby Face (1933) - Nick Powers
- Secret of the Blue Room (1933) - Paul, the Butler
- The Devil's in Love (1933) - Maj. Bertram (uncredited)
- Tugboat Annie (1933) - First Mate of 'Glacier Queen' (uncredited)
- Captured! (1933) - The Commandant
- My Lips Betray (1933) - Undetermined Role (uncredited)
- Wild Boys of the Road (1933) - Judge R.H. White
- I Loved a Woman (1933) - Charles Lane
- The Kennel Murder Case (1933) - Archer Coe
- From Headquarters (1933) - Anderzian
- Massacre (1934) - Dawson
- Hi, Nellie! (1934) - Beau Brownell
- Not Tonight, Josephine (1934, Short)
- Dark Hazard (1934) - Tex Willis
- Wonder Bar (1934) - Captain Hugo Von Ferring
- Gambling Lady (1934) - Mike Lee
- A Very Honorable Guy (1934) - Dr. Snitzer
- Upper World (1934) - Police Commissioner Clark
- Fog Over Frisco (1934) - Thorne
- Return of the Terror (1934) - Pudge Walker
- Midnight Alibi (1934) - Angie Morley
- Here Comes the Navy (1934) - Commander Denny
- Friends of Mr. Sweeney (1934) - Alex (Credits) / Alexis Romanoff
- Housewife (1934) - Sam Blake
- The Dragon Murder Case (1934) - Stamm
- Big Hearted Herbert (1934) - Jim
- I Sell Anything (1934) - McPherson
- The St. Louis Kid (1934) - Farmer Benson
- The Firebird (1934) - Halasz - the Apartment House Manager
- I Am a Thief (1934) - Baron Von Kampf
- Bordertown (1935) - Padre
- Devil Dogs of the Air (1935) - Commandant
- While the Patient Slept (1935) - Adolphe
- The Florentine Dagger (1935) - The Captain
- Village Tale (1935) - Drury Stevenson
- Stranded (1935) - Stanislaus Janauschek
- The Murder Man (1935) - Hal Robins - Newspaper Editor
- Special Agent (1935) - Chief of Internal Revenue Service
- Dressed to Thrill (1935) - Gaston Dupont
- Dr. Socrates (1935) - Dr. Ginder
- Moonlight on the Prairie (1935) - Buck Cantrell
- Captain Blood (1935) - Wolverstone
- Exclusive Story (1936) - Werther
- The Trail of the Lonesome Pine (1936) - Buck Falin
- The Country Doctor (1936) - MacKenzie
- I Married a Doctor (1936) - Nels Valborg
- Sons o' Guns (1936) - Pierre
- Mary of Scotland (1936) - Norton
- The Last of the Mohicans (1936) - Chingachgook
- Trailin' West (1936) - Abraham Lincoln
- The Charge of the Light Brigade (1936) - Count Igor Volonoff
- God's Country and the Woman (1937) - Jefferson Russett
- Black Legion (1937) - Brown (uncredited)
- The Barrier (1937) - John Gale
- Mountain Justice (1937) - Jeff Harkins
- Draegerman Courage (1937) - Martin Crane
- Souls at Sea (1937) - The Reverend (uncredited)
- The Life of Emile Zola (1937) - Major Walsin-Esterhazy
- Confession (1937) - Prosecuting Attorney
- Love Is on the Air (1937) - J.D. Harrington
- The Bad Man of Brimstone (1937) - 'Hank' Summers
- The Buccaneer (1938) - Captain Brown
- Penitentiary (1938) - Prison Yard Capt. Grady
- Forbidden Valley (1938) - Ramrod Locke
- Marie Antoinette (1938) - Citizen-Officer (uncredited)
- The Texans (1938) - Isaiah Middlebrack
- Breaking the Ice (1938) - William Decker
- Shadows Over Shanghai (1938) - Igor Sargoza
- Charlie Chan in Honolulu (1938) - Captain Johnson
- Union Pacific (1939) - Duke Ring
- The Return of the Cisco Kid (1939) - Sheriff McNally
- Man of Conquest (1939) - David Crockett
- Heritage of the Desert (1939) - Andrew Naab
- Colorado Sunset (1939) - Dr. Rodney Blair
- Conspiracy (1939) - Tio / Edwards
- Bad Lands (1939) - Sheriff Bill Cummings
- Allegheny Uprising (1939) - Duncan
- The Cisco Kid and the Lady (1939) - Jim Harbison
- Laddie (1940) - Mr. John Stanton
- The Man from Dakota (1940) - Parson Summers
- Northwest Passage (1940) - Humphrey Towne
- Captain Caution (1940) - Capt. Dorman
- Fugitive from a Prison Camp (1940) - Chester Russell
- Go West (1940) - 'Red' Baxter
- They Met in Argentina (1941) - Don Enrique de los Santos O'Shea
- Parachute Battalion (1941) - Col. Burke
- Riders of the Purple Sage (1941) - Judge Frank Dyer
- The Girl from Alaska (1942) - Frayne
- Fall In (1942) - Col. Elliott
- American Empire (1942) - Crowder
- A Stranger in Town (1943) - Mayor Connison
- They Came to Blow Up America (1943) - Capt. Kranz
- Bomber's Moon (1943) - Ernst
- Johnny Come Lately (1943) - Bill Swain
- The Adventures of Mark Twain (1944) - Horace E. Bixby - Riverboat Captain
- Enemy of Women (1944) - Wallburg the Publisher
- The Keys of the Kingdom (1944) - Willie's Father (scenes deleted)
- Grissly's Millions (1945) - Grissly Morgan Palmor
- The Great John L. (1945) - Billy Muldoon
- Wanderer of the Wasteland (1945) - Uncle Jim Collinshaw
- Dakota (1945) - Anson Stowe
- Road to Utopia (1945) - Sperry
- They Were Expendable (1945) - General MacArthur
- San Antonio (1945) - Col. Johnson
- Strangler of the Swamp (1946) - Christian Sanders
- Just Before Dawn (1946) - Clyde Travers
- Sunset Pass (1946) - Rand Curtis
- The Time of Their Lives (1946) - Maj. Putnam
- Dangerous Millions (1946) - Hendrick Van Boyden
- Magnificent Doll (1946) - Mr. Payne
- The Sea of Grass (1947) - Judge Seth White
- The Fabulous Texan (1947) - Dr. Sharp
- Road to Rio (1947) - Johnson
- I Love Trouble (1948) - Lt. Quint
- Relentless (1948) - Ed Simpson
- Joan of Arc (1948) - Jacques d'Arc
- Bad Men of Tombstone (1949) - Leadville Sheriff
- Song of India (1949) - Maharajah of Ramjat
- The Lone Wolf and His Lady (1949) - Steve Taylor
- Canadian Pacific (1949) - Cornelius Van Horne
- The Doolins of Oklahoma (1949) - Marshal Heck Thomas
- Davy Crockett, Indian Scout (1950) - James Lone Eagle
- Riders of the Range (1950) - Sheriff Cole
- The Baron of Arizona (1950) - Judge
- The Kid from Texas (1950) - General Lew Wallace
- American Guerrilla in the Philippines (1950) - Gen. Douglas MacArthur
- The Pride of Maryland (1951) - Colonel Harding
- Double Crossbones (1951) - Henry Morgan
- Darling, How Could You! (1951) - Mr. Rossiter
- Flight to Mars (1951) - Tillamar
- Distant Drums (1951) - Gen. Zachary Taylor
- Denver and Rio Grande (1952) - Charlie Haskins
- Son of Ali Baba (1952) - Commandant
- Cow Country (1953) - Walt Garnet
- Tall Man Riding (1955) - Tucker Ordway
