= Cavalry Scout (film) =

1951 film

- Theatrical release poster
- Directed by: Lesley Selander
- Written by: Daniel B. Ullman; Thomas W. Blackburn
- Produced by: Walter Mirisch
- Starring: Rod Cameron; Audrey Long; Jim Davis
- Cinematography: Harry Neumann
- Edited by: Richard V. Heermance
- Music by: Marlin Skiles
- Production company: Monogram Pictures
- Distributed by: Monogram Pictures
- Release date: May 13, 1951
- Running time: 78 minutes
- Country: United States
- Language: English

Cavalry Scout is a 1951 American Western film directed by Lesley Selander and starring Rod Cameron, Audrey Long and Jim Davis.

== Cast ==
- Rod Cameron as Kirby Frye
- Audrey Long as Claire Conville
- Jim Davis as Lieutenant Spauldiing
- James Millican as Martin Gavin
- James Arness as Barth
- John Doucette as Varney
- William 'Bill' Phillips as Sergeant Hal Wilkins
- Stephan Chase as Colonel Drumm
- Rory Mallinson as Corporal
- Eddy Waller as General William Sherman
- Frank Wilcox as Matson
- Cliff Clark as Colonel George Deering

== Bibliography ==
- Terry, Rowan. The American Western A Complete Film Guide. 2013.
