= Cow Country =

1953 film by Lesley Selander

- Theatrical release poster
- Directed by: Lesley Selander
- Written by: Adele Buffington; Thomas W. Blackburn
- Based on: Shadow Range; 1947 novel by Curtis Bishop
- Produced by: Scott R. Dunlap
- Starring: Edmond O'Brien; Helen Westcott; Robert Lowery; Barton MacLane; Peggie Castle; Robert Barrat; James Millican
- Cinematography: Harry Neumann
- Edited by: John C. Fuller
- Music by: Edward J. Kay
- Production company: Scott R. Dunlap Productions
- Distributed by: Allied Artists Pictures
- Release date: April 26, 1953
- Running time: 82 minutes
- Country: United States
- Language: English

Cow Country is a 1953 American Western film directed by Lesley Selander and written by Adele Buffington and Thomas W. Blackburn. The film stars Edmond O'Brien, Helen Westcott, Robert Lowery, Barton MacLane, Peggie Castle, Robert Barrat and James Millican. The film was released on April 26, 1953, by Allied Artists Pictures.

== Plot ==
Ben Anthony runs a freight line in Texas. He disappointed cattleman Walt Garnet by not going into that business. Walt's beautiful daughter Linda returns to town after a long absence and Ben still carries a torch for her, but she's now involved with another man, Harry Odell.

The cattle business is in trouble. Beef prices have dropped so low, cattle companies are being urged to sell their stock to a rendering plant. Ben tries to intervene, and eventually learns that banker Parker is colluding with Odell and the plant's owner, Sledge, to gain control of the ranchers' valuable land.

Melba Sykes and her father Tim are squatting on Walt's ranch. It turns out that Odell is not only hiding his business schemes from Linda but also the fact that he's been romancing Melba behind her back. Tim Sykes is killed, and when Sledge produces a bill of sale from the man, Ben knows it's been forged because Tim did not know how to write.

Melba boasts to Linda that her lover Odell will look out for her interest now. Linda realizes she's been betrayed and turns to Ben for solace and advice. Melba becomes furious when Odell breaks off their relationship and snaps a bullwhip at him.

A showdown ensues in a box canyon, where Parker and Sledge are planning to destroy the cattle they have rustled. Ben gets there in time to shoot them both. He is wounded himself, but will survive and also will now have Linda.

== Cast ==
- Edmond O'Brien as Ben Anthony
- Helen Westcott as Linda Garnet
- Robert Lowery as Harry Odell
- Barton MacLane as Marvin Parker
- Peggie Castle as Melba Sykes
- Robert Barrat as Walt Garnet
- James Millican as Fritz Warner
- Don Beddoe as Joe Davis
- Robert J. Wilke as Sledge
- Raymond Hatton as Smokey
- Chuck Courtney as Tom
- Steve Clark as Skeeter
- Rory Mallinson as Tim Sykes
- Marshall Reed as Riley
- Chuck Roberson as Stubby
- Tom Tyler as Pete
- Sam Flint as Maitland
- Jack Ingram as Terrell
- George J. Lewis as Sanchez

== Critical reception ==
Writing in Turner Classic Movies, critic Jeremy Arnold described the film as "a routine and now-forgotten western," noting that "supporting actress Peggie Castle [makes] an especially strong impression thanks to a vivid scene in which she horsewhips a man (Robert Lowery) to the ground." Critic Mark Franklin wrote that "A more literate and complex script than normal helps lift this B Western above average. It also helps make up for the lack of action," and "Peggie Castle nearly steals the film ... viciously turning on [Odell] with a whip when she realizes he never planned to marry her."
