= Peggie Castle =

American actress (1927–1973)

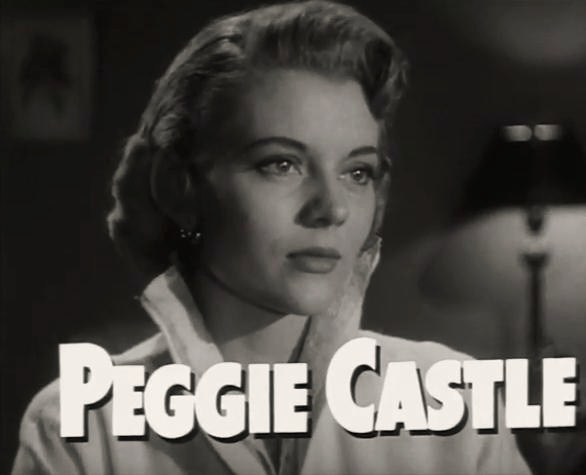
- Peggie Castle from Invasion, U.S.A. trailer
- Born: Peggy Thomas Blair; December 22, 1927; Appalachia, Virginia, U.S.
- Died: August 11, 1973 (aged 45); Hollywood, Los Angeles, California, U.S.
- Other names: Peggy Castle; Peggie Call
- Occupation: Actress
- Known for: Miss Cheesecake
- Spouses: Revis T. Call (m. 1945; div. 1950) Robert H. Rains (m. 1951; div. 1954) William McGarry (m. 1955; div. 1969) (1 child) Arthur Morganstern (m. 1971)
- Children: 1

Peggy Thomas Blair (December 22, 1927 – August 11, 1973), known professionally as Peggie Castle, was an American actress who specialized in playing the "other woman" in B-movies. She was Miss Cheesecake in 1949.

== Early life ==
Castle was born in Appalachia, Wise County, Virginia. She changed her last name "because there was another actress named Blair at the first studio in which she worked." Her father, Doyle H. Blair, was at one point "an industrial relations director for a large corporation" and later business manager for Donald O'Connor and studio manager for Goldwyn Studios. Her mother was Elizabeth Blair. She took lessons in drama when she was 8 years old.

Castle graduated from Hollywood High School and attended Mills College for two years.

== Career ==
=== Radio ===
Castle's first work as an actress came in the soap opera Today's Children. A spot on Lux Radio Theatre in 1947 brought her a screen-test offer from 20th Century Fox.

=== Film ===
Castle was discovered by a talent scout at a restaurant in Beverly Hills and signed to a seven-year contract with Universal-International. She made her film debut in the 1947 film When a Girl's Beautiful. In 1949, she was named "Miss Cheesecake" by the Southern California Restaurant Association, and later that year, the Junior Chamber of Commerce named her "Miss Three Alarm". Best known for her leading role as the femme fatale in the 1953 film adaptation of Mickey Spillane's best-selling novel I, The Jury, Castle also appeared in the films Mr. Belvedere Goes to College (1949), Payment on Demand (1951), The Prince Who Was a Thief (1951) Invasion, U.S.A. (1952), Cow Country (1953), 99 River Street (1953), Beginning of the End (1957), and Arrivederci Roma (1957). She often starred in Westerns, appearing in nearly a dozen between Wagons West (1952) and Hell's Crossroads (1957).

=== Television ===
In the 1950s, Castle moved into television, with multiple guest roles on Fireside Theater, Cheyenne, 77 Sunset Strip, and The Restless Gun. In 1956, she appeared as Mississippi in the episode "Fury at Rio Hondo" and then again in 1957 as Amy Gordon on Cheyenne in the episode titled "The Spanish Grant". In 1957, she played defendant Sally Fenner in the Perry Mason episode, "The Case of the Negligent Nymph". Also in 1957, she was a primary star on Gunsmoke, as forlorn Nita Tucker in the episode "Chester's Murder".

From 1959 to 1962, she co-starred in the television Western series Lawman, her first continuing series. Her role as saloon owner Lily Merrill brought out a new dimension of Castle's talent. She said, "For the first time in my life, I'm a singer—that's the producer's opinion, not mine."

Her final onscreen role was a guest appearance in a 1966 episode of The Virginian.

=== Stage ===
In 1958, Castle appeared with Jesse White in a production of A Hole in the Head at the Civic Playhouse in Los Angeles.

=== Personal appearances ===
In 1960, Castle and Peter Brown (who also was a regular in Lawman) traveled to rodeos, performing as a song-and-dance team. Castle stressed, "We're very careful not to sing any romantic songs," treating the act more like a brother-sister team. The duo's stops included St. Louis, Chicago, Detroit, Pittsburgh, and Albuquerque.

== Awards ==
On February 8, 1960, Castle received a star on the Hollywood Walk of Fame at 6230 Hollywood Boulevard.

== Personal life ==
Castle was married four times. She married Revis T. Call, a second lieutenant in the Army, on August 19, 1945, in Los Angeles. Following that marriage, she began using Peggy Call as her professional name. They divorced in 1950. She married Universal publicist Robert H. Rains on January 4, 1951. They divorced April 29, 1954.

On July 24, 1955, Castle married producer/director, William McGarry. They had a daughter, Erin McGarry. Castle divorced McGarry in 1969.

In 1971, Castle married Arthur Morganstern. They remained married until his death in April 1973.

=== Death ===
Castle was addicted to alcohol. On August 11, 1973, her third husband, William McGarry, found her body on the couch of her Hollywood apartment. Her death was later determined to be caused by cirrhosis.

== Filmography ==
This is a partial list of films.

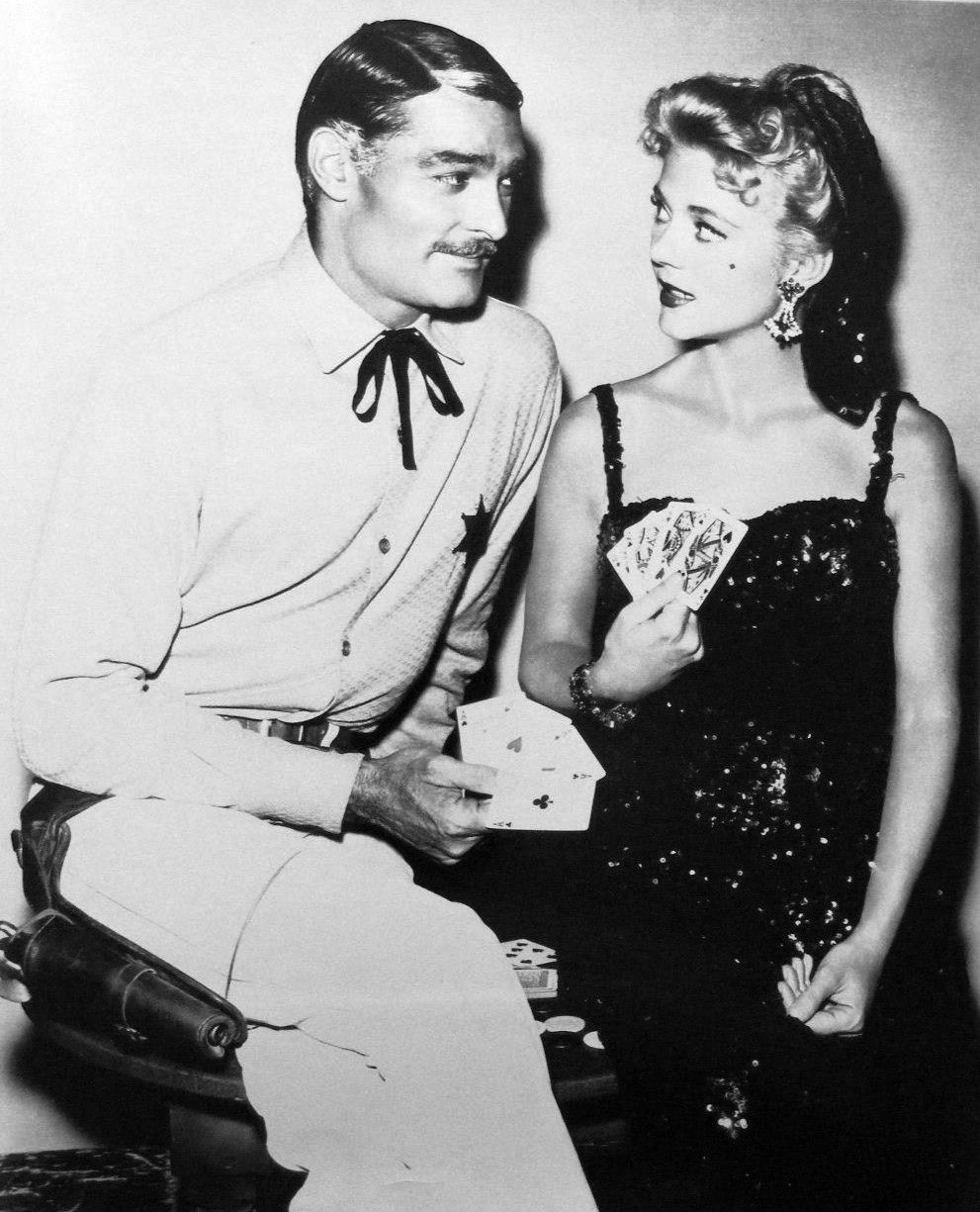
John Russell and Peggie Castle in ABC's Lawman (1959)

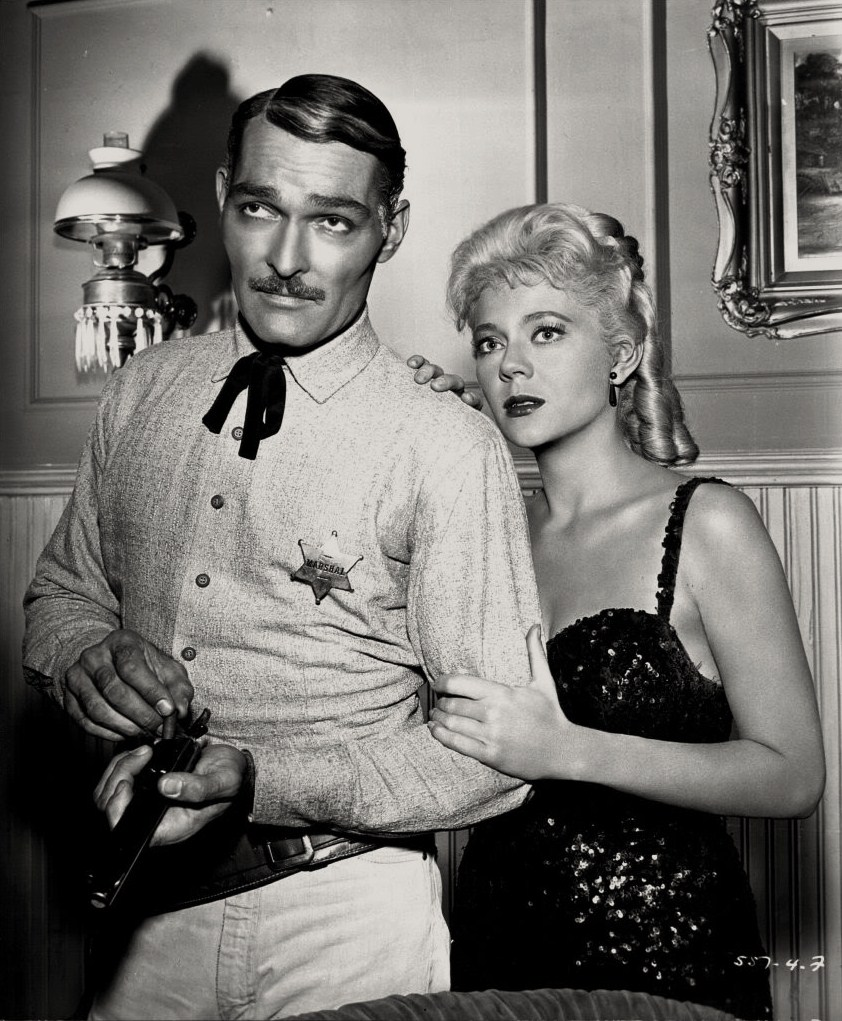
Russell and Castle in Lawman (1962)

=== Films ===
Year	Title	Role	Notes
1947	When a Girl's Beautiful	"Koko" Glayde	Credited as Peggy Call
1950	Buccaneer's Girl	Cleo	
1951	The Prince Who Was a Thief	Princess Yasmin	
1951	Payment on Demand	Diana Ramsey	
1951	Air Cadet	Pat	
1951	The Golden Horde	Lailee	
1952	Invasion, U.S.A.	Carla Sanford	
1952	Wagons West	Ann Wilkins	
1953	I, the Jury	Charlotte Manning	Shown in 3-D
1953	99 River Street	Pauline Driscoll	
1953	Cow Country	Melba Sykes	
1954	The Yellow Tomahawk	Katherine	
1954	The White Orchid	Kathryn Williams	
1954	Overland Pacific	Ann Dennison	
1954	The Long Wait	Venus	
1954	Jesse James' Women	Waco Gans	
1955	Finger Man	Gladys Baker	
1955	Two-Gun Lady	Karen Marshall	
1955	Tall Man Riding	Reva	
1955	Target Zero	Ann Galloway	Korean War UN worker
1956	Miracle in the Rain	Millie Kranz	
1956	Quincannon, Frontier Scout	Lesley Selander	
1957	Beginning of the End	Audrey Aimes	
1957	The Counterfeit Plan	Carole Bernard	
1957	Back from the Dead	Mandy Anthony	Horror Film
1958	Arrivederci Roma	Carol Ralston	

=== Television ===
Year	Title	Role	Notes
1952–1954	Fireside Theater	Various roles	3 episodes
1956	Our Miss Brooks	Uncredited (played Frankie)	Episode: "Connie and Frankie"
1956	The Millionaire	Candy Caldwell	Episode: "The Candy Caldwell Story"
1956	Four Star Playhouse	Molly Barry	Episode: "Success Story"
1956	Dick Powell's Zane Grey Theatre	Jenny	Episode: "A Quiet Sunday in San Ardo"
1956	Cheyenne	Mississippi	Episode: "Fury at Rio Hondo"
1957	Conflict	Lila Prescott	Episode: "The Money"
1957	Gunsmoke	Nita Tucker	Episode: "Chester's Murder"
1957	Perry Mason	Sally Fenner	Episode: "The Case of the Negligent Nymph"
1958	The Restless Gun	Amity Hobbs	Episode "Hornitas Town"
1958	The Texan	Charlotta Rivera	Episode: "The First Notch"
1958	77 Sunset Strip	Valerie Stacey	Episode: "The Well-Selected Frame"
1959	Mickey Spillane's Mike Hammer	Joan Barry	Episode: "The Big Drop"
1959	The Restless Gun		Episode: "Lady by Law"
1959	Markham	Ann Jennings	Episode: "Deadline Date"
1959–1962	Lawman	Lily Merrill	105 episodes
1966	The Virginian	Melissa	Episode: "Morgan Starr"
