= Alias the Champ =

1949 film by George Blair

- Theatrical release poster
- Directed by: George Blair
- Screenplay by: Albert DeMond
- Produced by: Stephen Auer
- Starring: Robert Rockwell; Barbra Fuller; Audrey Long; James Nolan; John Harmon; Sammy Menacker; Joseph Crehan
- Cinematography: John MacBurnie
- Edited by: Harold Minter
- Music by: Stanley Wilson
- Production company: Republic Pictures
- Distributed by: Republic Pictures
- Release date: October 15, 1949
- Running time: 60 minutes
- Country: United States
- Language: English

Alias the Champ is a 1949 American crime film directed by George Blair and written by Albert DeMond. The film stars Robert Rockwell, Barbra Fuller, Audrey Long, James Nolan, John Harmon, Sammy Menacker and Joseph Crehan. The film was released on October 15, 1949, by Republic Pictures.

== Plot ==
Lorraine Connors manages the (real-life) wrestler, Gorgeous George. Taking a special interest in George's match is a police lieutenant, Ron Peterson, who is keeping an eye on everybody: mobster Al Merlo, his moll Colette LaRue and another wrestling star, Sammy Menacker, who is dating Lorraine.

A quarrel between the wrestlers erupts and Peterson suggests they settle it in the ring. So much publicity ensues that the match is televised live. Sam is confident he will win, as is Colette, who requests his autograph. Sam is getting the better of George for a while, but is suddenly pinned, defeated and does not get up. He is dead.

George is clearly the prime suspect if this is a murder, while Peterson gets in hot water at the police department for proposing the match in the first place. Merlo is the detective's best guess as the culprit until he views a rebroadcast of the whole evening on TV. He finds the pen Colette used to get Sam's autograph and realizes what happened: It's been poisoned.

== Cast ==
- Robert Rockwell as Police Lt. Ron Peterson
- Barbra Fuller as Colette LaRue
- Audrey Long as Lorraine Connors
- James Nolan as Al Merlo
- John Harmon as Chuck Lyons
- Sammy Menacker as Sammy Menacker
- Joseph Crehan as Tim Murphy
- John Hamilton as Police Commissioner Bronson
- Stephen Chase as Dist. Atty. Gould
- Frank J. Scannell as Bert Tracy
- Frank Yaconelli as Headwaiter
- Emmett Vogan as Doc Morgan
- John Wald as TV Announcer
- Gorgeous George as Gorgeous George
- Mike Ruby as Referee
- Jimmy Lennon Sr. as Ring Announcer
- Henry Kulky as Bomber Kulkovich
- Billy Varga as Wrestler
- Bobby Manogoff as Wrestler
- George Temple as Wrestler
- Tor Johnson as Super Swedish Angel
- Jack 'Sockeye' McDonald as Wrestler
