= Adventures of Gallant Bess =

1948 film

- Theatrical release poster
- Directed by: Lew Landers
- Written by: Matthew Rapf (screenplay)
- Produced by: Jerry Briskin (producer); Matthew Rapf (producer)
- Starring: Cameron Mitchell; Audrey Long; Fuzzy Knight; James Millican; John Harmon
- Cinematography: William Bradford
- Edited by: Harry Komer
- Music by: Irving Gertz
- Production company: Crestview Productions
- Distributed by: Eagle-Lion Films
- Release date: December 22, 1948
- Running time: 73 minutes
- Country: United States
- Language: English

Adventures of Gallant Bess is a 1948 American contemporary Western film directed by Lew Landers and starring Cameron Mitchell, Audrey Long, Fuzzy Knight, James Millican, and John Harmon. It was filmed in Cinecolor. It has no connection to the 1947 Metro-Goldwyn-Mayer film Gallant Bess, though publicity stated that "Bess the Wonder Horse" from the earlier film was also in this film.

== Plot summary ==
Drifting and down on his luck cowboy Ted Daniels captures a beautiful wild horse, names her Bess and teaches her a variety of tricks. Ted loses his ranch hand job from spending so much time with Bess. Ted thinks his luck will change by winning a large prize in a local rodeo, but the unscrupulous carnival owner, who wants Bess to appear in his show, has one of his stooges cover the horns of the steer Ted is to bulldog (wrestle) with slippery oil breaking Ted's leg in the process. Ted is laid up, and Bess comes to look for Ted. She causes damage, to a man's car when someone tries to catch her.

Having no money, Ted is forced to let Bess get sold at auction to pay for the damages. The traveling carnival owner has bought her and she is mistreated and forced into performing in the show. As Ted recovers he must decide whether to find a way to get his horse back or settle down with the doctor's daughter, who is nursing him back to health. He chooses to reunite with Bess.

== Cast ==
- Cameron Mitchell as Ted Daniels
- Audrey Long as Penny Gray
- Fuzzy Knight as Woody
- James Millican as Bud Millerick
- John Harmon as Blake
- Edward Gargan as Deputy
- Harry Cheshire as Doctor Gray
- Cliff Clark as Sheriff

== See also ==
- List of films about horses
