= Trailin' West =

1936 film by Noel M. Smith

- Directed by: Noel Smith
- Written by: Anthony Coldeway
- Produced by: Hal B. Wallis; Jack L. Warner
- Starring: Dick Foran; Paula Stone; Wild Bill Elliott
- Cinematography: Sidney Hickox; Ted D. McCord
- Edited by: Frank Magee
- Music by: Howard Jackson
- Production company: First National Productions Corp.
- Distributed by: Warner Bros. Pictures
- Release date: September 5, 1936
- Running time: 56 minutes
- Country: United States
- Language: English

Trailin' West (UK title: On Secret Service) is a 1936 American Western film directed by Noel M. Smith and written by Anthony Coldeway and starring Dick Foran, Paula Stone, and Wild Bill Elliott.

== Plot ==
In 1864, President Abraham Lincoln sends an undercover agent, Lt. Red Colton, to fictional Kent City to apprehend Curly Thorne and his outlaws who are disrupting Union gold shipments. Nearing the town, Red stops the robbery of a stage line, and meets passenger Lucy Blake. Red checks in to the local hotel under the name "John Madison," but his credentials are stolen. Jefferson Duane, in cahoots with Thorne, uses Red's credentials to gain the trust of the Union's Colonel Douglas to gain information about the gold shipments.

Red accepts a job as a card dealer at Thorne's bar where Lucy works as a dance hall girl. Red and Lucy overhear a plot between Duane and Thorne to secure assistance from Black Eagle and his Indian tribe in exchange for running guns to the Indians. Lucy erroneously believes Red as "John Madison" is involved in this plot and reports it to Colonel Douglas. Red is arrested and is unable to convince Colonel Douglas of his true identity after Duane lies about his own identity. It is revealed that Lucy, also, is working undercover for the Union.

Red escapes custody and convinces Lucy, in Duane's presence, that he, not Duane, is the true Union agent. A gunfight ensues as Duane and his thugs escape during which Lucy receives a flesh wound. Red reports to Colonel Douglas and also convinces him of his true identity. Red leads Union troops to intervene just as the gold shipment is under attack by the Indians and Thorne's gang. The shipment is saved, and Red subdues both Thorne and Duane during their attempted escape. President Lincoln promotes Red to major, and it is revealed Red and Lucy are now married.

== Cast ==
- Dick Foran as Lt. Red Colton
- Paula Stone as Lucy Blake
- Wild Bill Elliott as Jefferson Duane
- Addison Richards as Curly Thorne
- Robert Barrat as Abraham Lincoln
- Joseph Crehan as Colonel Douglas
- Fred Lawerence as Lt. Dale
- Eddie Shubert as Happy Simpson
- Henry Otto as Hawk
- Stuart Holmes as Elwin H. Stanton
- Milton Kibbee as Steve
- Jim Thorpe as Black Eagle

== See also ==
- List of films and television shows about the American Civil War
