= Tall in the Saddle =

1944 film by Edwin L. Marin

- Theatrical release poster
- Directed by: Edwin L. Marin
- Screenplay by: Michael Hogan; Paul Fix
- Based on: Tall in the Saddle by Gordon Ray Young
- Produced by: Robert Fellows
- Starring: John Wayne; Ella Raines; Ward Bond; George "Gabby" Hayes; Audrey Long; Elisabeth Risdon; Don Douglas
- Cinematography: Robert De Grasse
- Edited by: Philip Martin Jr.
- Music by: Roy Webb
- Production companies: RKO Radio Pictures; Avernus Productions
- Distributed by: RKO Radio Pictures
- Release date: September 29, 1944 (US)
- Running time: 87 minutes
- Country: United States
- Language: English
- Budget: $565,754
- Box office: $2,000,000

Tall in the Saddle is a 1944 American Western film starring John Wayne and Ella Raines. Written by character actor Paul Fix and Michael Hogan, based on the serialized novel of the same name by Gordon Ray Young, it was directed by Edwin L. Marin.

Tall in the Saddle was the only film to pair Wayne, who plays the tough cowboy, and Raines, who plays the fiery horsewoman and ranch owner. The film features a strong supporting cast that includes Ward Bond, George "Gabby" Hayes, Audrey Long, Elisabeth Risdon, Don Douglas, and Paul Fix.

== Plot ==
Rocklin, a tough but quiet cowboy, arrives in Santa Inez by stagecoach with the stern Miss Martin and her kindly niece Clara. Rocklin has a letter written by ranch owner Red Cardell hiring him as the K.C. Ranch foreman. The stern Miss Martin disputes this, announcing that the K.C. Ranch is Clara's legacy. Rocklin learns that Cardell was murdered. Harolday, owner of the Topaz Ranch, hires him to find a gang of rustlers who Harolday believes killed Red Cardell. Meanwhile, a romantic rivalry develops between Clara and Harolday's fiery daughter Arly.

Cardell was preparing to visit the district judge to present a deck of marked cards he found in a friend's coat. Rocklin finds two decks of marked cards in local lawyer Garvey's desk and accuses him of murdering Red Cardell. Garvey grabs Rocklin’s gun and the two engage in a violent struggle that ends with Garvey knocked unconscious.

Rocklin interrogates Harold's stepson Clint about Garvey's involvement in Red Cardell's murder. Outside the hotel, someone climbs to the window of Rocklin's room, takes Rocklin's gun, and fires. Clint is killed. The assailant tosses the gun back into the room to incriminate Rocklin. Hearing the gunshot, townspeople rush into the room and see Rocklin with the gun in his hand standing over Clint's dead body. When Garvey accuses Rocklin of murdering Clint, Rocklin denies it and escapes through the window.

Miss Martin reluctantly admits to Clara that Rocklin is the nephew of Red Cardell and stands to inherit everything, and that she and Garvey contrived to prevent that from happening. Rocklin overhears the scheme. Outside, someone is about to shoot Rocklin through a window when Arly and her male friend Tala stop him. The murderer tries to escape but is killed by Tala's knife. Rocklin extracts a confession from the murderer's confederate.

Clara realizes she doesn't belong in the west, and leaves Rocklin and Arly to a new life together.

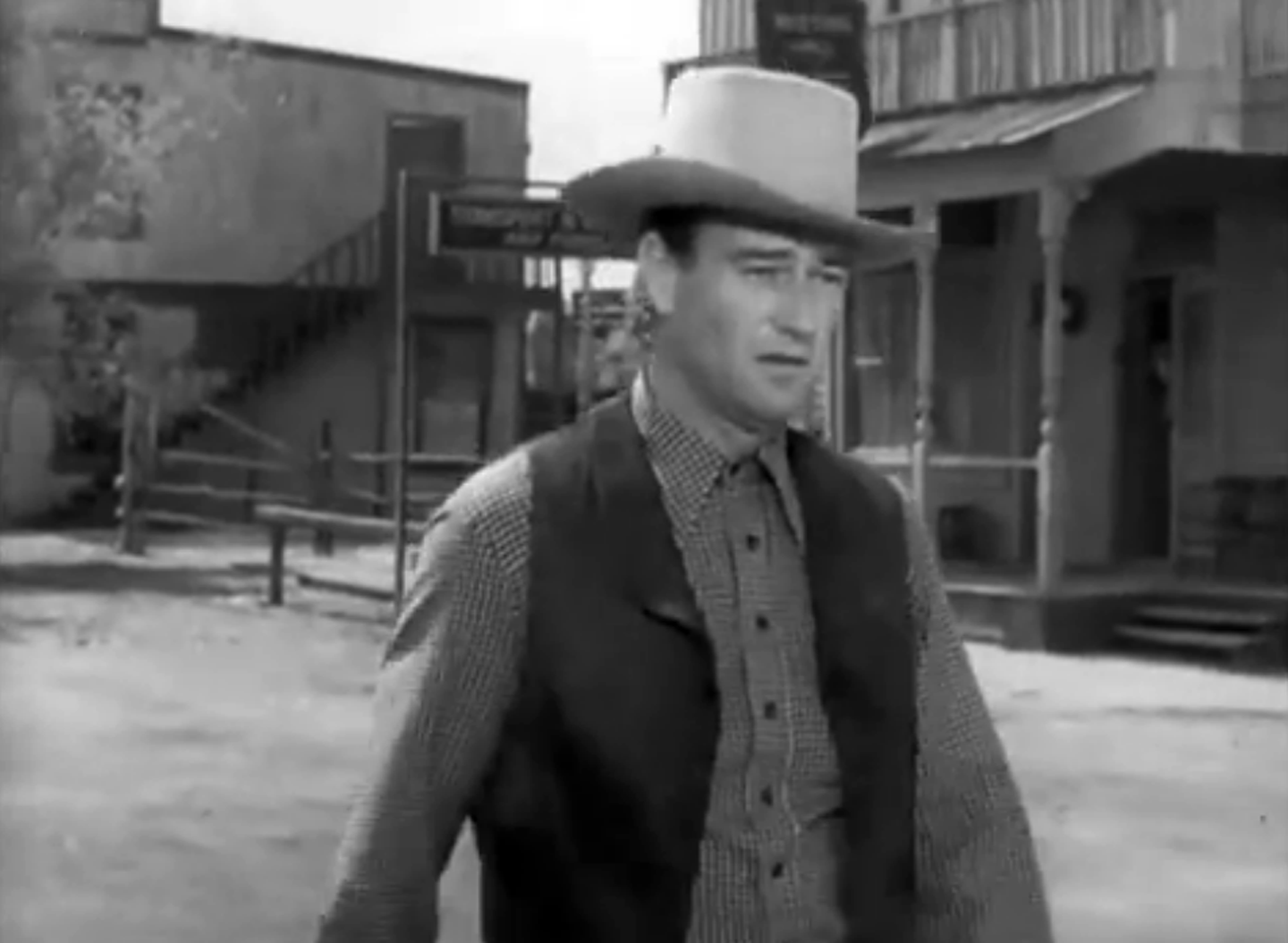
John Wayne as Rocklin

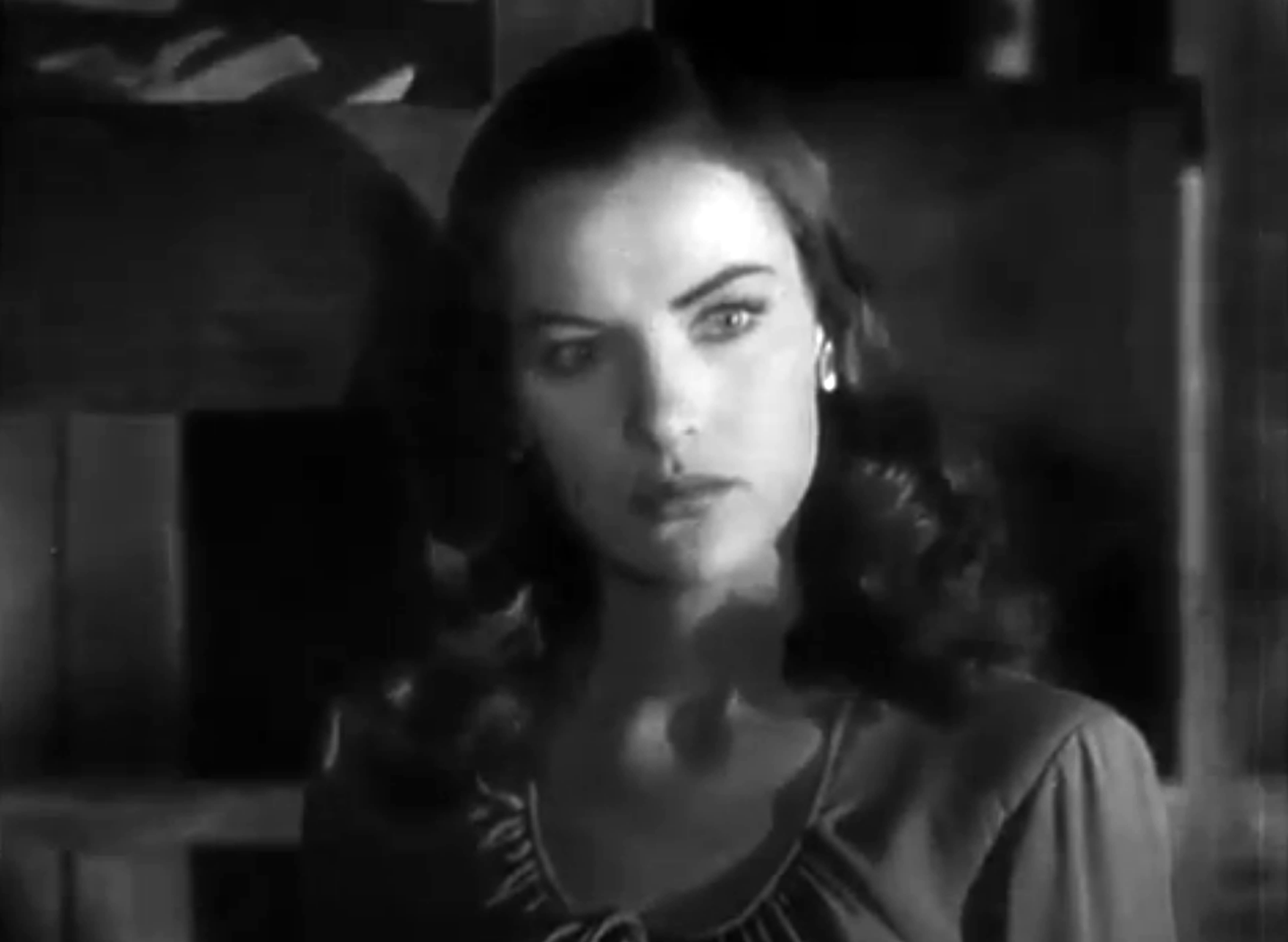
Ella Raines as Arly Harolday

== Cast ==
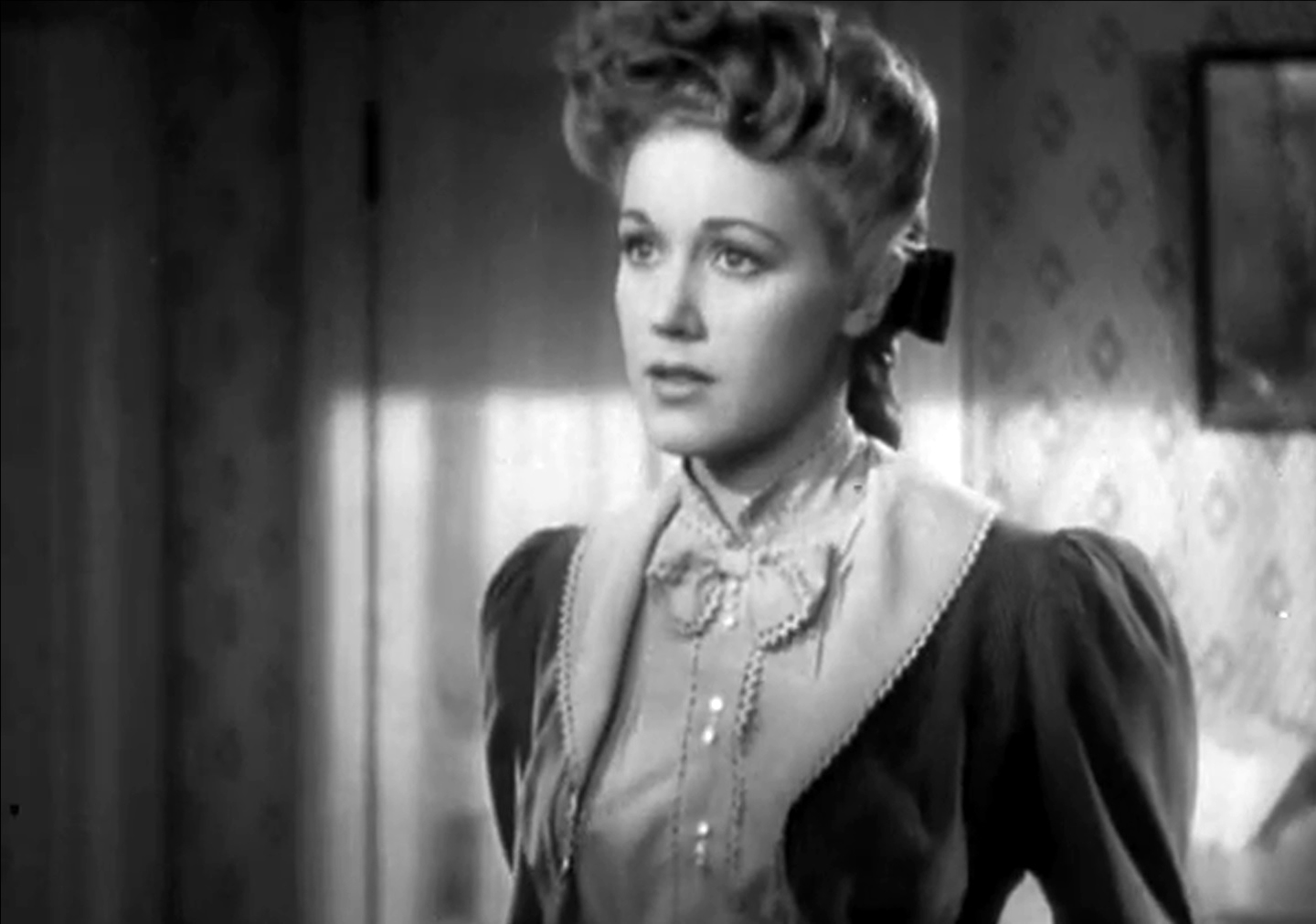
Audrey Long as Clara Cardell

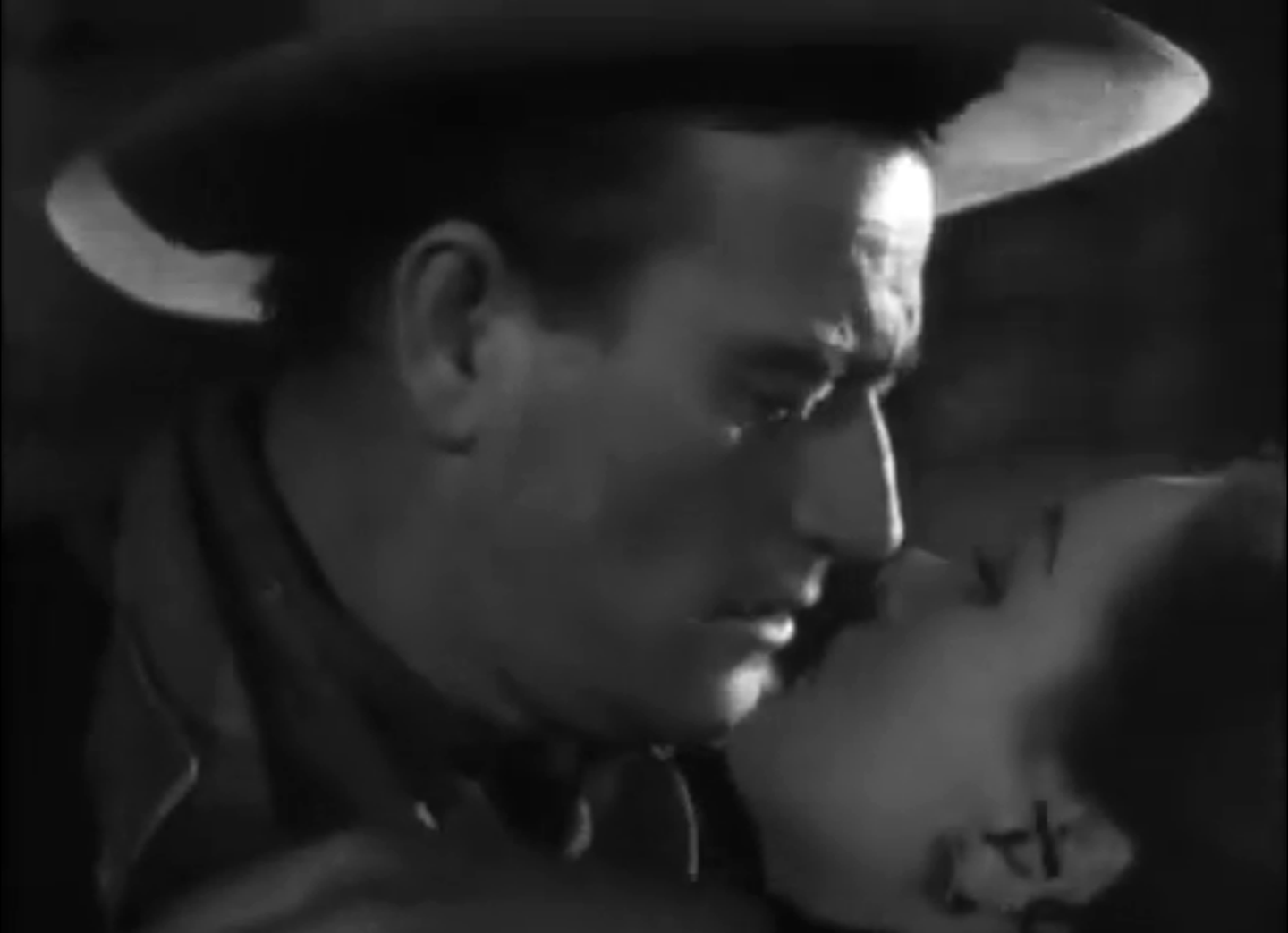
John Wayne and Ella Raines

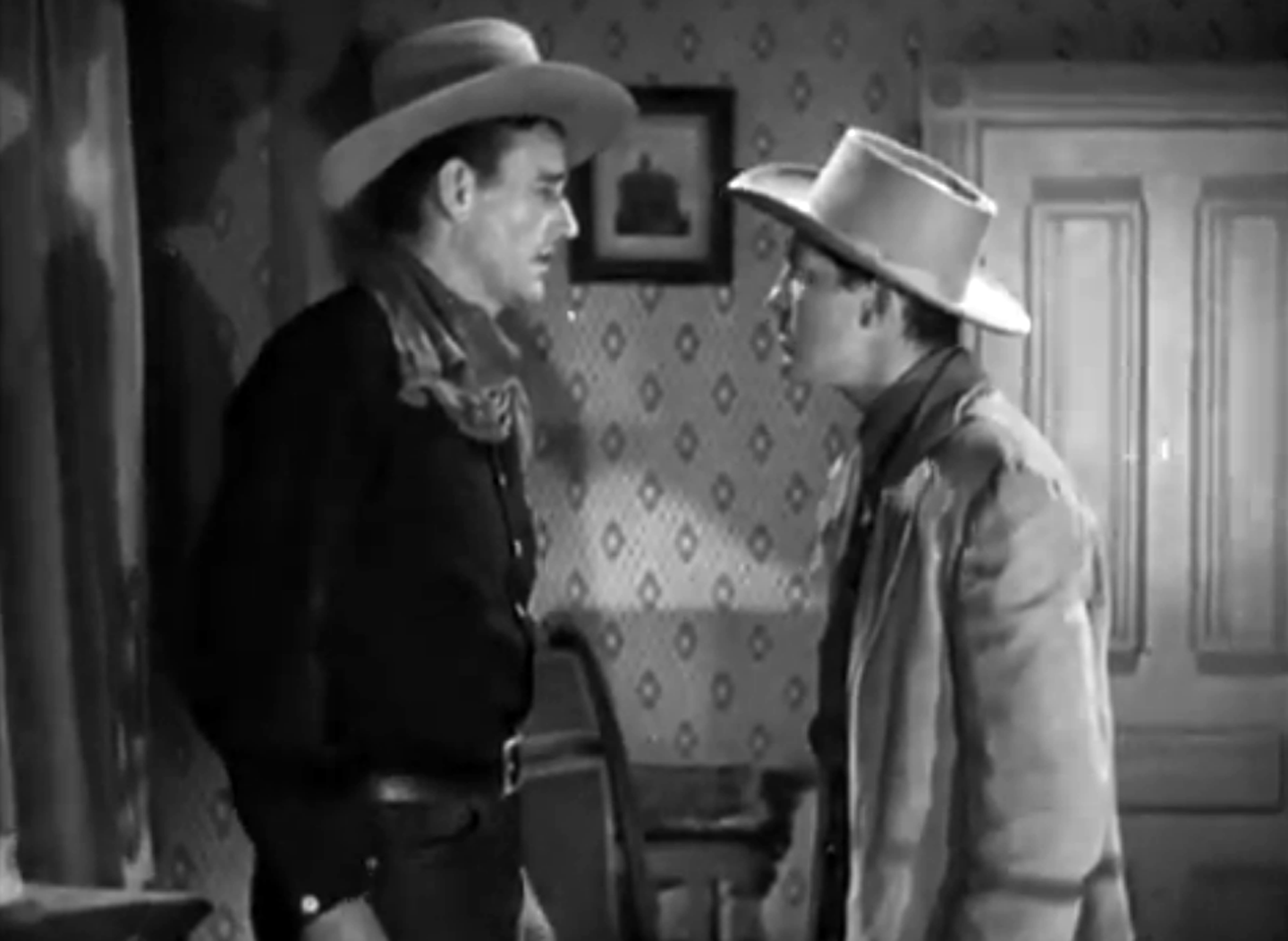
John Wayne and Russell Wade as Clint Harolday

- John Wayne as Rocklin
- Ella Raines as Arly Harolday
- Russell Wade as Clint Harolday
- George "Gabby" Hayes as Dave
- Don Douglas as Harolday
- Ward Bond as Judge Robert Garvey
- Frank Puglia as Tala
- Audrey Long as Clara Cardell
- Elisabeth Risdon as Miss Elizabeth Martin
- Emory Parnell as Sheriff Jackson
- Raymond Hatton as Zeke
- Paul Fix as Bob Clews
- Harry Woods as George Clews

== Production ==
=== Screenplay ===
The screenplay for Tall in the Saddle was written by Paul Fix and Michael Hogan, and was based on the novel Tall in the Saddle by Gordon Ray Young. The novel was serialized in The Saturday Evening Post from March 7, 1942 to April 25, 1942.

=== Filming ===
Tall in the Saddle was filmed on location at Agoura Ranch in Agoura, California; Lake Sherwood, California; RKO Encino Ranch in Encino, California; and Sedona, Arizona. Studio scenes were shot at RKO Studios in Hollywood, Los Angeles, California. Principal photography began in mid-April 1944 and was completed by mid-June 1944.

== Critical response ==
Upon its theatrical release on September 29, 1944, the film received mixed reviews. The reviewer for the New York Times called the film "a regulation rough-and-tumble Western", complete with a thundering stage coach ride through sagebrush country, fist fights, shootings, and "the customary romantic clinch". The reviewer acknowledged that Wayne saves the film from its predictability:

Mr. Wayne has to fight his way through every inch of this film, against toughies like Ward Bond, a crooked judge; Harry Woods, a no-account rustler, and Russell Wade, a weakling gun-happy young rancher. Even Ella Raines sends some bullets whizzing perilously close to our hero's head ... Mr. Wayne walks into a mess of trouble in Red Rock, but in 87 noisy minutes he bowls over the opposition, turns up the murderer of his cousin, and has Miss Raines purring in his arms. Just take Tall in the Saddle for what it is, a rousing old-fashioned Western, and you won't go wrong.

== Box office ==
Tall in the Saddle cost $565,754, and earned $2 million in rentals for a profit of $730,000 (equivalent to $13 million today).

== Home media ==
Tall in the Saddle was released to DVD on May 19, 1998 by Turner Home Entertainment and Warner Home Video.

== See also ==
- John Wayne filmography
