= Audrey Long =

American actress (1922–2014)

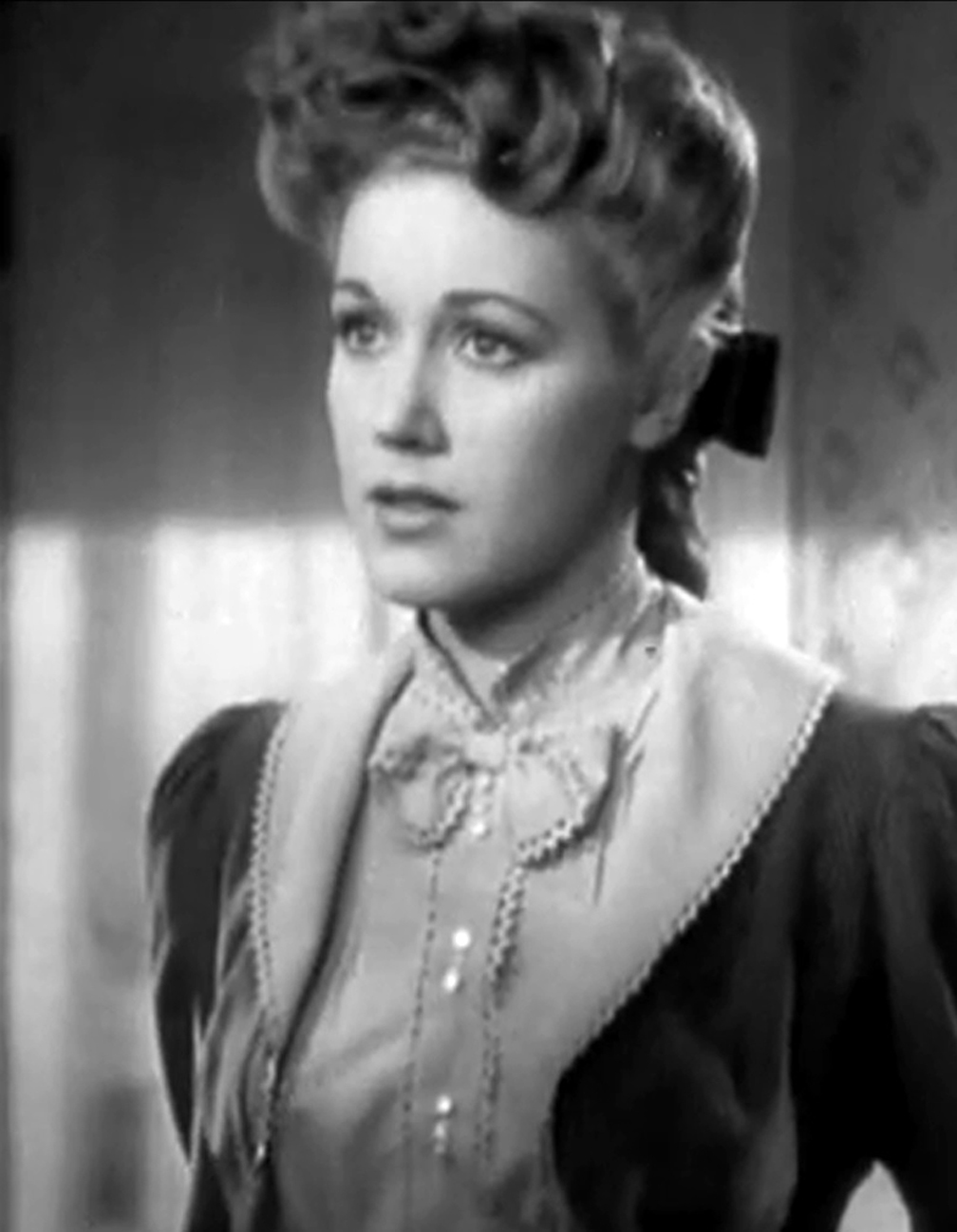
- Long in Tall in the Saddle (1944)
- Born: Audrey Gwendoline Long; April 14, 1922; Orlando, Florida, U.S.
- Died: September 19, 2014 (aged 92); Surrey, England, UK
- Occupation: Actress
- Years active: 1942–1952
- Spouses: Edward Rubin (m. 1945; div. 1951) Leslie Charteris (m. 1952; died 1993)

Audrey Gwendoline Long (April 14, 1922 – September 19, 2014) was an American stage and screen actress of English descent, who performed mainly in low-budget films in the 1940s and early 1950s. Some of her more notable film performances are in Tall in the Saddle (1944) with John Wayne, Wanderer of the Wasteland (1945), Born to Kill (1947), and Desperate (1947).

== Early life and education ==
Long was born on April 14, 1922, in Orlando, Florida, the first-born child of English parents. Her father, Christopher Stanley Long, was an Episcopal minister, a naturalized American citizen who served as a chaplain with the United States Navy; her mother Ellen Gwendoline Erskine. She spent some time in Hawaii where her younger brother John Stanley Long was born. She was educated at St. Margaret's School in Tappahannock, Virginia, Los Gatos High School in Los Gatos, California, and Disputanta High School, Virginia. She worked as a model before becoming an actress.

== Career ==
In 1942, Long made her screen debut in The Male Animal playing a student. That same year she was cast as a receptionist in Yankee Doodle Dandy. Other roles followed in 1943. In May 1943, Long played the character Dora Applegate in the Broadway production Sons and Soldiers. She returned to film work the following year, cast as the female lead with John Wayne in Tall in the Saddle. In 1945, she performed in Wanderer of the Wasteland.

In 1947, Long had featured roles in two films noir: Desperate and Born to Kill. She appeared in many low-budget films from 1948 through 1951, including six in 1948. In 1952, Long made her last film, Indian Uprising, playing the role of Norma Clemson. She retired from acting that year.

== Personal life ==
In January 1945, Long married Edward Rubin, a dialogue director. They divorced in 1951. On April 26 the next year, in California, Long married Leslie Charteris, a British novelist best known for his works chronicling the adventures of Simon Templar in the literary series The Saint. The couple traveled extensively during their marriage, with Charteris using their travel locations as settings for his Saint novels, made into the popular 1960s British TV series. The two remained together for over 40 years, until Leslie's death in 1993.

== Death ==
Long died on September 19, 2014, in Surrey, England. Upon her death, she was cremated, and her ashes were placed in a large urn which contains the ashes of her late husband Leslie Charteris. The inscription on the urn reads "Love Never Dies".

== Filmography ==
- The Male Animal (1942) - Student
- Yankee Doodle Dandy (1942) - Dietz and Goff's receptionist (uncredited)
- Eagle Squadron (1942) - Nurse
- Pardon My Sarong (1942) - Girl on bus with Tommy (uncredited)
- The Great Impersonation (1942) - Anna (uncredited)
- A Night of Adventure (1944) - Erica Drake Latham
- Tall in the Saddle (1944) - Clara Cardell
- Pan-Americana (1945) - Jo Anne Benson
- Wanderer of the Wasteland (1945) - Jeanie Collinshaw
- The Lost Weekend (1945) - Cloakroom attendant (uncredited)
- A Game of Death (1945) - Ellen Trowbridge
- Perilous Holiday (1946) - Audrey Latham
- Born to Kill (1947) - Georgia Staples
- Desperate (1947) - Mrs. Anne Randall
- Adventures of Gallant Bess (1948) - Penny Gray
- Song of My Heart (1948) - Princess Amalya
- Perilous Waters (1948) - Judy Gage
- Stage Struck (1948) - Nancy Howard
- Miraculous Journey (1948) - Mary
- Homicide for Three (1948) - Iris Duluth aka Mona Crawford
- Duke of Chicago (1949) - Jane Cunningham
- Air Hostess (1949) - Lorraine Carter
- Post Office Investigator (1949) - Clara Kelso
- Alias the Champ (1949) - Lorraine Connors
- Trial Without Jury (1950) - Myra Peters
- David Harding, Counterspy (1950) - Betty Iverson
- The Petty Girl (1950) - Mrs. Connie Manton Dezlow
- Blue Blood (1951) - Sue Buchanan
- Insurance Investigator (1951) - Nancy Sullivan
- Cavalry Scout (1951) - Claire Conville
- Sunny Side of the Street (1951) - Gloria Pelley
- The Bigelow Theatre (1951; television series)
- Indian Uprising (1952) - Norma Clemson
