= The Long Wait =

1954 film by Victor Saville

- Theatrical release poster
- Directed by: Victor Saville
- Screenplay by: Alan Green; Lesser Samuels
- Based on: The Long Wait by Mickey Spillane
- Produced by: Lesser Samuels
- Starring: Anthony Quinn; Charles Coburn; Gene Evans; Peggie Castle
- Cinematography: Franz Planer
- Edited by: Ronald Sinclair
- Music by: Mario Castelnuovo-Tedesco
- Production company: Parklane Pictures
- Distributed by: United Artists
- Release date: May 26, 1954
- Running time: 94 minutes
- Country: United States
- Language: English
- Box office: $1.5 million

The Long Wait is a 1954 American crime drama film noir directed by Victor Saville starring Anthony Quinn, Charles Coburn, Gene Evans and Peggie Castle. The film is based on the 1951 novel of the same title by Mickey Spillane. It was an independent production distributed by United Artists.

== Plot ==
Johnny McBride is badly hurt while hitch hiking and loses his memory when the car he is riding in crashes; he also has his fingerprints burned off. Two years later, a clue leads him to his old home town, where he finds he is a murder suspect. McBride tries to clear his name of the presumed murder charges. Thugs working for the local mob boss try to end his meddling.

== Cast ==
- Anthony Quinn as Johnny McBride
- Charles Coburn as Gardiner
- Gene Evans as Servo
- Peggie Castle as Venus
- Mary Ellen Kay as Wendy Miller
- Shirley Patterson as Carol Shay
- Dolores Donlon as Troy Avalon
- Barry Kelley as Tucker
- James Millican as Police Capt. Lindsey
- Bruno VeSota as Eddie Packman
- Jay Adler as Joe—Bellhop
- John Damler as Alan Logan
- Frank Marlowe as Pop Henderson

== Reception ==
The New York Times called it slow-paced, boring, and likely to disappoint fans of the novel.

=== Noir analysis ===
Film Noir: An Encyclopedic Reference to the American Style by Alain Silver and Elizabeth Ward writes: "The inclusion of amnesia, giving the hero a sense of hopelessness compounded by the frustration of his loss of identity, instills a distinct existential bias into McBride's search. This attitude combines with a pervading sense of corruption and dehumanization to give The Long Wait a fatalistic noir ethos."
