= James Millican =

American actor (1911–1955)

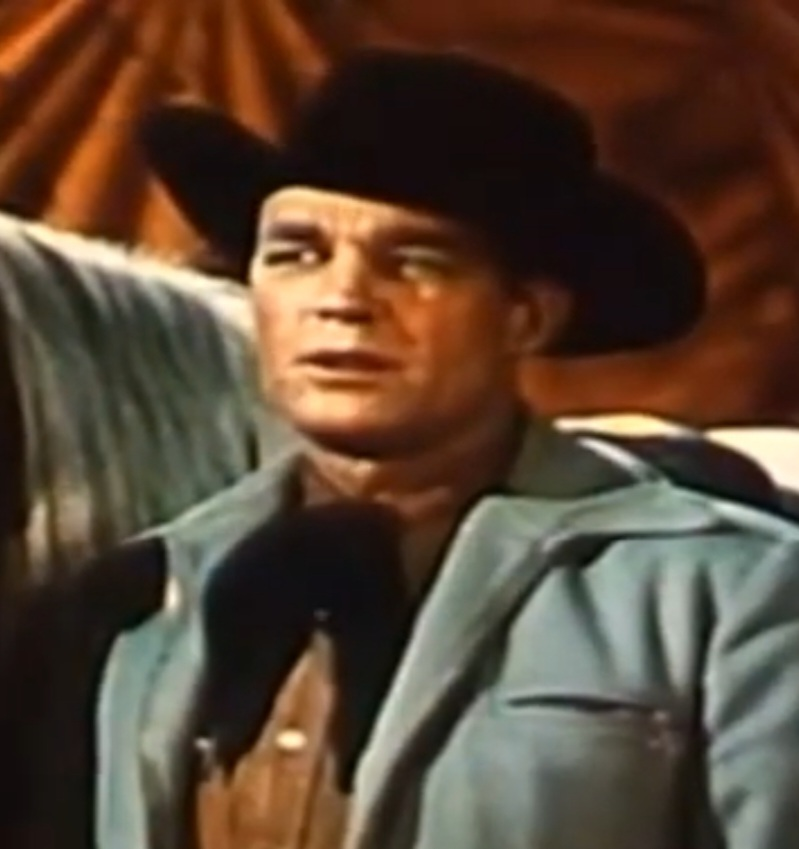
- Millican in Adventures of Gallant Bess (1948)
- Born: February 17, 1910; Palisades, New Jersey, U.S.
- Died: November 24, 1955 (aged 45); Los Angeles, California, U.S.
- Resting place: Forest Lawn Memorial Park, Glendale, California
- Years active: 1932–1955
- Spouse: Dorothy Eleanor Griffith

James Millican (February 17, 1910 – November 24, 1955) was an American actor with over 200 film appearances mostly in western movies.

== Biography ==
Millican was the son of Fred S. Millican, a circus owner, and Amelia Millican. He had two brothers and two sisters.

Millican was a close associate of cowboy star "Wild" Bill Elliott, staging a number of personal-appearance rodeos on Elliott's behalf. Millican was sent to Metro-Goldwyn-Mayer's dramatic school directly after graduating from University of Southern California.

== Personal life and death ==
Millican and his wife, Dorothy, had a daughter and a son. He died on November 24, 1955, after a brief illness and is buried in Forest Lawn Memorial Park (Glendale), California.

== Selected filmography ==
- Mills of the Gods (1934) – Chauffeur
- Love Me Forever (1935) – Phillip's Friend (uncredited)
- Atlantic Adventure (1935) – Sailor (uncredited)
- Case of the Missing Man (1935) – Pedestrian (uncredited)
- Too Tough to Kill (1935) – Worker (uncredited)
- You May Be Next (1936) – Radio Technician (uncredited)
- Mr. Deeds Goes to Town (1936) – Intern (uncredited)
- Counterfeit (1936) – Roadhouse Patron (uncredited)
- Killer at Large (1936) – Hotel Clerk (uncredited)
- Let's Get Married (1937) – Weatherman (uncredited)
- The Devil Is Driving (1937) – Reporter (uncredited)
- S.O.S. Coast Guard (1937) – Dock Heavy 4 (uncredited)
- She Married an Artist (1937) – Reporter (uncredited)
- Who Killed Gail Preston? (1938) – Hank
- Extortion (1938) – Craig's Brother (uncredited)
- The Main Event (1938) – Policeman (uncredited)
- Highway Patrol (1938) – Oil Worker (uncredited)
- I Am the Law (1938) – Law Student (uncredited)
- You Can't Take It with You (1938) – Policeman (uncredited)
- Flight to Fame (1938) – Pilot (uncredited)
- Spring Madness (1938) – Dartmouth College Student (uncredited)
- The Little Adventuress (1938) – Performer (uncredited)
- The Lone Wolf Spy Hunt (1939) – Cabby (uncredited)
- Flying G-Men (1939, Serial) – Gang Pilot (uncredited)
- Honolulu (1939) – Lifeguard on Ship (uncredited)
- Society Lawyer (1939) – Reporter (uncredited)
- North of the Yukon (1939) – Mountie (uncredited)
- Back Door to Heaven (1939) – Convict in Baseball Game (uncredited)
- Only Angels Have Wings (1939) – Mechanic (uncredited)
- Daughters Courageous (1939) – Boy on Beach (uncredited)
- Coast Guard (1939) – Sailor (uncredited)
- Those High Grey Walls (1939) – Guard (uncredited)
- Scandal Sheet (1939) – Student
- Mr. Smith Goes to Washington (1939) – Senate Reporter (uncredited)
- A Chump at Oxford (1939) – Chauffeur (uncredited)
- His Girl Friday (1940) – Tim (uncredited)
- Convicted Woman (1940) – Cop (uncredited)
- Too Many Husbands (1940) – Nightclub Patron (uncredited)
- The Mortal Storm (1940) – Student (uncredited)
- Golden Gloves (1940) – Bob (uncredited)
- Glamour for Sale (1940) – Client in Nightclub (uncredited)
- So You Won't Talk (1940) – Cop (uncredited)
- Girls Under 21 (1940) – Cop (uncredited)
- Flight Command (1940) – North Island Tower Operator (voice, uncredited)
- Meet John Doe (1941) – Photographer (uncredited)
- I Wanted Wings (1941) – Corporal (uncredited)
- Barnacle Bill (1941) – Sailor (uncredited)
- Washington Melodrama (1941) – Police Detective (uncredited)
- A Woman's Face (1941) – Photographer (uncredited)
- Love Crazy (1941) – Miami Private Investigator (uncredited)
- Down in San Diego (1941) – Sentry (uncredited)
- You'll Never Get Rich (1941) – Prisoner (uncredited)
- International Lady (1941) – Roy (uncredited)
- Among the Living (1941) – Townsman (uncredited)
- The Bugle Sounds (1942) – Recruit Tank Driver (uncredited)
- Nazi Agent (1942) – Operator (uncredited)
- Cadets on Parade (1942) – Lieutenant Thomas (uncredited)
- The Fleet's In (1942) – Sailor (uncredited)
- The Man Who Returned to Life (1942) – Johnny / Charlie (uncredited)
- Joe Smith, American (1942) – Aircraft Plant Foreman (uncredited)
- The Remarkable Andrew (1942) – Onlooker (uncredited)
- Tramp, Tramp, Tramp! (1942) – Draftee (uncredited)
- My Favorite Blonde (1942) – Truck Driver (uncredited)
- Fingers at the Window (1942) – Reporter (uncredited)
- Hello, Annapolis (1942) – Lt. Blake (uncredited)
- The Wife Takes a Flyer (1942) – Gestapo Agent (uncredited)
- Take a Letter, Darling (1942) – Chauffeur (uncredited)
- Wake Island (1942) – Radio Operator (uncredited)
- The Secret Code (1942, Serial) – Reporter Bill [Ch.1] (uncredited)
- The Glass Key (1942) – Politician (uncredited)
- A Man's World (1942) – Parks
- The Forest Rangers (1942) – Cowboy in Hotel Lobby (uncredited)
- I Married a Witch (1942) – Wedding Guest (uncredited)
- Star Spangled Rhythm (1942) – Ramrod – Sailor (uncredited)
- Stand by for Action (1942) – Talker (uncredited)
- Air Force (1943) – Marine with Dog on Wake Island (uncredited)
- Pilot No. 5 (1943) – Lieutenant (uncredited)
- So Proudly We Hail! (1943) – Young Ensign (uncredited)
- Thousands Cheer (1943) – Captain at Eddie's Trial (uncredited)
- Riding High (1943) – Photographer (uncredited)
- Northern Pursuit (1943) – Army Driver (uncredited)
- A Guy Named Joe (1943) – Orderly (uncredited)
- The Story of Dr. Wassell (1944) – Robert Elroy Whaley (uncredited)
- I Love a Soldier (1944) – Georgie (uncredited)
- The National Barn Dance (1944) – Radio Man (uncredited)
- And Now Tomorrow (1944) – Man in Tails (uncredited)
- Practically Yours (1944) – Co-Pilot (uncredited)
- The Sign of the Cross (1944 Re-Release Prologue) (1932) – Capt. Kevin Driscoll – (uncredited)
- Bring On the Girls (1945) – Guard (uncredited)
- The Affairs of Susan (1945) – Major (uncredited)
- You Came Along (1945) – Lt. Cmdr. George Nelson (uncredited)
- Incendiary Blonde (1945) – Hector – Actor (uncredited)
- Love Letters (1945) – Jim Connings (uncredited)
- Duffy's Tavern (1945) – Assistant Director (uncredited)
- The Lost Weekend (1945) – Nurse (uncredited)
- Tokyo Rose (1946) – Pvt. Al Wilson
- To Each His Own (1946) – Lt. Flyer (uncredited)
- The Blue Dahlia (1946) – Photographer (uncredited)
- The Bride Wore Boots (1946) – Kerwin Haynes (uncredited)
- The Well-Groomed Bride (1946) – Shore Patrolman (uncredited)
- Our Hearts Were Growing Up (1946) – Stage Manager (uncredited)
- The Searching Wind (1946) – Reporter in Madrid (uncredited)
- Rendezvous with Annie (1946) – Capt. Spence
- Two Years Before the Mast (1946) – Young Dandy (uncredited)
- Suddenly, It's Spring (1947) – Military Policeman (uncredited)
- Spoilers of the North (1947) – Bill Garraway
- Stepchild (1947) – Brian Reed
- The Trouble with Women (1947) – Keefe
- The Tender Years (1948) – Kit Barton
- Let's Live Again (1948) – George Blake
- Mr. Reckless (1948) – Pete
- Hazard (1948) – Houseman
- The Return of Wildfire (1948) – Frank Keller
- In This Corner (1948) – Charles 'Tug' Martin
- Rogues' Regiment (1948) – Cobb
- Disaster (1948) – Sam Payne
- Adventures of Gallant Bess (1948) – Bud Millerick
- Command Decision (1948) – Major Garrett Davenport
- Last of the Wild Horses (1948) – Sheriff Steve Harrison
- The Man from Colorado (1948) - Sgt. Jericho Howard
- Rimfire (1949) – Capt. Tom Harvey
- Grand Canyon (1949) – Tex Hartford
- The Gal Who Took the West (1949) – Hawley
- Fighting Man of the Plains (1949) – Cummings
- The Dalton Gang (1949) – Sheriff Jeb
- Everybody's Dancin' (1950) – Papa Steve Berne
- Military Academy with That Tenth Avenue Gang (1950) – Maj. Tony Thomas
- The Gunfighter (1950) – Pete (uncredited)
- Winchester '73 (1950) – Wheeler
- Beyond the Purple Hills (1950) – Rocky Morgan
- Convicted (1950) – Guard in Kitchen (uncredited)
- Devil's Doorway (1950) – Ike Stapleton
- Mister 880 (1950) – Olie Johnson
- The Du Pont Story (1950) – Alfred I. du Pont
- Al Jennings of Oklahoma (1951) – Ed Jennings
- Missing Women (1951) – Hans Soderling
- The Great Missouri Raid (1951) – Sgt. Trowbridge
- Fourteen Hours (1951) – Police Sgt. Boyle
- Rawhide (1951) – Tex Squires
- I Was a Communist for the FBI (1951) – Jim Blandon
- Cavalry Scout (1951) – Martin Gavin
- Warpath (1951) – Gen. George Armstrong Custer
- Scandal Sheet (1952) – Lt. Davis
- Bugles in the Afternoon (1952) – Sgt. Hines
- High Noon (1952) – Deputy Sheriff Herb Baker (uncredited)
- Carson City (1952) – Jim Squires
- Diplomatic Courier (1952) – Sam F. Carew
- The Winning Team (1952) – Bill Killefer
- Springfield Rifle (1952) – Matthew Quint
- Torpedo Alley (1952) – Cmdr. Heywood
- Cavalry Scout (1953) – Luke Bowen
- Cow Country (1953) – Fritz Warner
- Gun Belt (1953) – Wyatt Earp
- The Stranger Wore a Gun (1953) – William Clarke Quantrill (uncredited)
- A Lion Is in the Streets (1953) – Samuel T. Beach
- Crazylegs (1953) – L.A. Ram's Coach
- Jubilee Trail (1954) – Rinardi
- Riding Shotgun (1954) – Dan Marady
- The Long Wait (1954) – Police Capt. Lindsey
- The Outcast (1954) – Cal Prince
- Dawn at Socorro (1954) – Marshal Harry McNair
- The Man from Laramie (1955) – Tom Quigby
- The Big Tip Off (1955) – Det. Lt. George East
- Strategic Air Command (1955) – Maj. Gen. 'Rusty' Castle
- Chief Crazy Horse (1955) – Gen. Crook
- Las Vegas Shakedown (1955) – Wheeler Reid
- I Died a Thousand Times (1955) – Jack Kranmer
- The Vanishing American (1955) – Walker
- Top Gun (1955) – Marshal Bat Davis
- Red Sundown (1956) – Bud Purvis (final film role)
