= Wagons West =

1952 film by Ford Beebe

- Directed by: Ford Beebe
- Written by: Dan Ullman
- Produced by: Vincent M. Fennelly
- Starring: Rod Cameron; Noah Beery Jr. Peggie Castle
- Cinematography: Harry Neumann
- Edited by: Walter Hannemann
- Music by: Marlin Skiles
- Production companies: Allied Artists Productions; Silvermine Productions
- Release date: July 6, 1952 (US)
- Running time: 70 minutes
- Country: United States
- Language: English

Wagons West is a 1952 American Cinecolor Western film directed by Ford Beebe and starring Rod Cameron, Noah Beery Jr., and Peggie Castle.

== Plot ==
Jeff Curtis has been hired as a wagonmaster to take a wagon train across the Wild West. He faces a jealous boyfriend of Ann Wilkins, a person suspected of bank robbery, secret gunrunners and Cheyenne on the warpath.

== Cast ==
- Rod Cameron as Jeff Curtis
- Noah Beery Jr. as Arch Lawrence
- Peggie Castle as Ann Wilkins
- Michael Chapin as Ben Wilkins
- Henry Brandon as Clay Cook
- Sara Haden as Mrs. Elizabeth Cook
- Frank Ferguson as Cyrus Cook
- John Parrish as Chief Black Kettle
- Anne Kimbell as Alice Lawrence
- Wheaton Chambers as Sam Wilkins
- Riley Hill as Gaylord Cook
- Effie Laird as Emma
- I. Stanford Jolley as Slocum
- Glenn Strange as Marshal Jim
- Almira Sessions as Ada
- Harry Tyler as Old man
