= Desperate (film) =

1947 film by Anthony Mann

- Theatrical release poster
- Directed by: Anthony Mann
- Screenplay by: Harry Essex
- Story by: Dorothy Atlas; Anthony Mann
- Produced by: Michael Kraike
- Starring: Steve Brodie; Audrey Long; Raymond Burr
- Cinematography: George E. Diskant
- Edited by: Marston Fay
- Music by: Paul Sawtell
- Production company: RKO Pictures
- Release dates: June 4, 1947 (Racine, Wisconsin); June 20, 1947 (United States)
- Running time: 73 minutes
- Country: United States
- Language: English

Desperate is a 1947 suspense film noir directed by Anthony Mann and featuring Steve Brodie, Audrey Long, Raymond Burr, Douglas Fowley, William Challee and Jason Robards.

== Plot summary ==
Steve Randall (Brodie) is an independent trucker who is hired by an old friend to haul some freight. Only when Steve arrives at the warehouse does he discover he has been hired to haul away stolen goods. Steve wants no part of the plot and resists, but a cop is killed as they're committing the burglary, and all except one manage to get away.

Later, after kidnapping and assaulting Steve, the criminals, led by Walt Radak (Burr), threaten to mutilate Randall's wife (Long) unless Steve confesses to the murder committed by Radak's brother, captured during the theft and sentenced to death for the cop-killing.

Steve plays along with the criminals just long enough to escape. He takes his wife and leaves town, heading cross country. The couple are then pursued by both the cops and the crooks. Steve then discovers his wife is pregnant with their first child, making the stakes even higher that they get away to safety.

== Cast ==
- Steve Brodie as Steve Randall
- Audrey Long as Mrs. Anne Randall
- Raymond Burr as Walt Radak
- Douglas Fowley as Pete Lavitch, Private Eye
- William Challee as Reynolds
- Jason Robards Sr. as Det. Lt. Louie Ferrari
- Freddie Steele as Shorty Abbott
- Lee Frederick as Joe Daly
- Paul E. Burns as Uncle Jan
- Ilka Grüning as Aunt Klara

== Home media ==
Warner Bros. released the film on DVD on July 13, 2010, in its Film Noir Classic Collection, Vol. 5.

Has been shown on the Turner Classic Movies show 'Noir Alley' with Eddie Muller.
