= Wanderer of the Wasteland (1945 film) =

1945 film by Wallace Grissell

- Theatrical release poster
- Directed by: Wallace Grissell; Edward Killy
- Screenplay by: Norman Houston
- Based on: Wanderer of the Wasteland by Zane Grey
- Produced by: Herman Schlom
- Starring: James Warren; Richard Martin; Audrey Long
- Cinematography: Harry J. Wild
- Edited by: J. R. Whittredge
- Music by: Paul Sawtell
- Production company: RKO Radio Pictures
- Distributed by: RKO Radio Pictures
- Release date: September 28, 1945 (US)
- Running time: 67 minutes
- Country: United States
- Language: English

Wanderer of the Wasteland is a 1945 American Western film directed by Wallace Grissell and Edward Killy and starring James Warren in his RKO debut replacing Robert Mitchum who had starred in Nevada and West of the Pecos from the same screenwriter and director. Richard Martin, and Audrey Long also star in the film. The screenplay was written by Norman Houston. Loosely based on the 1923 novel Wanderer of the Wasteland by Zane Grey, the film is about a young cowboy searching for the man who killed his father when he was a boy. With his lifelong friend at his side, he travels the country following his one clue—a distinctive brand on the killer's horse. When he tracks down the now elderly murderer, he finds he cannot kill him because of his feelings for the man's kindhearted daughter. Wanderer of the Wasteland was filmed on location in Lone Pine, California. Produced by RKO Radio Pictures, the film was released on September 28, 1945 in the United States.

== Plot ==
In 1880 the Rafferty family is traveling by covered wagon across the Mojave Desert with their sheep when young Chito hears a voice crying out for help. A boy named Adam Larey stumbles in from the unforgiving sands of Death Valley and leads them to his parents' burning wagon, where they discover the body of his murdered father—the mother having died earlier that day. The family's ten thousand dollars and a framed picture of his mother are missing. The only clue left behind is the crescent J brand on the murderer's dead horse. Angered by the loss, Adam vows to avenge his father's death. The kindhearted Raffertys adopt Adam and raise him as their own.

Ten years later, Adam returns to Randsburg, California and the Rafferty's sheep ranch after a year of wandering in search of his father's killer. Adam and Chito have remained close through the years, and Mama and Papa Rafferty are overjoyed at their stepson's homecoming. The next day in town, Adam notices the crescent J brand on a suitcase owned by Jeanie Collinshaw who is passing through town. When he questions her about the brand, her travel companion knocks him out, and the two board a stagecoach to Pichacho, Arizona. After he revives, Adam learns the stagecoach's destination and soon heads off to Arizona with Chito.

When they arrive in Pichacho, Adam spots a horse bearing the crescent J brand outside a saloon and confronts the owner, Jeanie's reckless brother Jay Collinshaw. When Jay goes for his gun, Adam shoots him in the wrist in self-defense, then leaves the saloon with Chito and checks into a local hotel. Unknown to Jay, the card dealer and Guerd Eliott, the foreman at the Crescent J Ranch, have been cheating him in cards. That night Adam returns to his hotel and finds Jeanie waiting for him. She invites him to the ranch on behalf of her uncle, Jim Collinshaw, who owns the ranch. The next day they meet on the trail as planned and ride together to the ranch. Along the way a hidden gunman fires a shot at Adam but misses. Later at the ranch, Jeanie introduces Adam to Collinshaw, who is uses a wheelchair. When Collinshaw offers Adam a job keeping Jay out of trouble, he accepts the offer as long as Chito is also hired. After Adam leaves, Collinshaw takes out a small framed photo of Adam's mother.

The next day at the town hall, Adam examines the deed to the Crescent J Ranch and discovers that Collinshaw purchased the ranch ten years earlier for ten thousand dollars—the exact amount stolen from Adam's family. Convinced that Collinshaw killed his father, Adam decides to confront the old man at Jeanie's birthday party later that night. At the party, Jay sneaks into his uncle's office and steals a thousand dollars and rides off to town to gamble. When Adam arrives, he meets with Collinshaw and accuses him of murdering his father. The old man acknowledges the crime, explaining that he killed his father out of revenge because he took away Adam's mother, the woman Collinshaw loved. He hands Adam the framed photo of his mother. As he's about to shoot Collinshaw, Adam thinks about Jeanie, whom he loves, and knows he cannot go through with his plan of revenge. Collinshaw shows Adam his will and confession. Realizing he can never live happily with Jeanie as long as Collinshaw is in their lives, he decides to return to California, but agrees to try and recover the stolen money from Jay.

After Adam leaves, Guerd Eliott enters Collinshaw's office and learns that the old man is about to confess to the Larey murder and that he has left his entire estate to Adam in his will. Knowing the old man's confession would implicate Adam if he were murdered, Eliott shoots Collinshaw dead and then organizes a posse to arrest Adam for the crime. Meanwhile, at the saloon, Adam proves that the dealer has been cheating with marked cards and confiscates the money stolen from Jay. On his way out of town, Adam is arrested by Eliott and the posse and taken to jail.

That night, Jeanie visits Adam in jail and reveals that her brother admitted to stealing the thousand dollars. She pleads with him to tell the truth and save himself, and stop protecting Jay. Soon Chito arrives and breaks Adam out of jail. Adam rides off alone, goes to Eliott's room, and forces him at gunpoint to accompany him on foot into the desert. Weakened and exhausted, Eliott admits that he murdered Collinshaw just as Jeanie, Chito, and the posse arrive. Jeanie shows everyone her uncle's confession, which contains on the back his last handwritten note acknowledging that Adam, out of his love for Jeanie, decided not to avenge the murder of his father.

Sometime later, Chito, Adam, and Adam's new bride Jeanie return to Rafferty's sheep ranch and are welcomed with love by Mama and Papa Rafferty. Adam assures Mama that this time he is home to stay.

== Cast ==
- James Warren as Adam Larey
- Richard Martin as Chito Rafferty
- Audrey Long as Jeanie Collinshaw
- Robert Barrat as Uncle Jim Collinshaw
- Robert Clarke as Jay Collinshaw
- Harry Woods as Guerd Eliott
- Minerva Urecal as Mama Rafferty
- Harry D. Brown as Papa Mike Rafferty
- Tommy Cook as Chito as a Boy
- Harry McKim as Adam as a Boy
- Jason Robards Sr. as Crooked Dealer

== Production ==
Wanderer of the Wasteland was filmed on location in the Alabama Hills of Lone Pine, California.

== Release ==
Wanderer of the Wasteland was released by RKO Radio Pictures on June 1, 1945 in the United States. The film was reissued on June 16, 1951.

== Critical response ==
Upon its theatrical release, Wanderer of the Wasteland received generally poor reviews. The reviewer for The New York Times called the film a "soporific little Western" and a "pallid and static picturization", while praising the performances of James Warren and Richard Martin who "supply the few flickers of spirit and humor" in the film. The reviewer for Variety magazine was equally unimpressed with the film, noting that it "doesn't offer much for fans of Western action and virility".

In his review for AllMovie, Bruce Eder wrote that the film had promise and some good performances, but that it lacked character development and "could have been a better movie if the makers had been allowed to deliver something longer than 67 minutes". Despite these shortcomings, Eder appreciated the "engaging" performance of James Warren in his first starring role, as well as the "excellent support all around" from Richard Martin, Minerva Urecal, Harry D. Brown, and Audrey Long.

== Adaptations ==
Wanderer of the Wasteland was the third film adaptation of Zane Grey's 1923 novel Wanderer of the Wasteland, which was published serially in McClure's magazine, beginning in May 1920. The first adaptation was a silent film made using Technicolor process 2 (an early Technicolor process), produced by Famous Players–Lasky in 1924, directed by Irvin Willat and starring Jack Holt, Noah Beery, and Billie Dove. A sound film adaptation was produced by Paramount in 1935, directed by Otho Lovering and starring Dean Jagger and Gail Patrick.
