= Sunset Pass (1946 film) =

1946 film directed by William A. Berke

- Directed by: William Berke; Harry Mancke (assistant); Doran Cox (assistant)
- Screenplay by: Norman Houston
- Based on: Sunset Pass by Zane Grey
- Produced by: Herman Schlom
- Starring: James Warren; Nan Leslie; Jane Greer
- Cinematography: Frank Redman
- Edited by: Samuel E. Beetley
- Music by: Paul Sawtell
- Production company: RKO Radio Pictures
- Distributed by: RKO Radio Pictgures
- Release date: October 1, 1946 (US)
- Running time: 60 minutes
- Country: United States
- Language: English

Sunset Pass is a 1946 American Western film directed by William Berke from a screenplay by Norman Houston, based upon the novel of the same name by Zane Grey. The film stars James Warren, Nan Leslie, John Laurenz as Chito Rafferty, Jane Greer, Robert Barrat, Harry Woods, Robert Clarke, Steve Brodie, and Harry Harvey.

== Plot ==
Rocky, a detective posing as an itinerant cowpoke, boards a train with his partner, Chito Rafferty. Rocky's job is to help ensure the delivery of business funds to the small cattle town of Wagon Tongue. Just before its arrival, however, the train is cleaned out by a band of masked bandits. Back in Wagon Tongue, the bank manager, Mr. Daab, frustrated by the robbery, fires Rocky. But his dismissal does not deter him from following up on the robbery. Rocky makes it his goal to recover the cash and save the solvency of the town's various businesses.

== Cast ==
- James Warren as Rocky
- Nan Leslie as Jane Preston
- John Laurenz as Chito Rafferty
- Jane Greer as Lolita Baxter
- Robert Barrat as Rand Curtis
- Harry Woods as Cinnabar
- Robert Clarke as Ash Preston
- Steve Brodie as Cashier Slagle
- Harry Harvey as Daab - Banker

== Bibliography ==
- Pitts, Michael R. Western Movies: A Guide to 5,105 Feature Films. McFarland, 2012.
