= James Warren (actor) =

American actor

- James Warren in Wanderer of the Wasteland (1945)
- Born: James Pringle Wittlig; February 24, 1913; Marietta, Ohio, U.S.
- Died: March 28, 2001 (aged 88); Kihei, Hawaii, U.S.
- Occupation: Actor

James Warren (February 24, 1913 – March 28, 2001) was an American film actor and artist. After a film career in Hollywood in the 1940s and 1950s, mainly in Westerns, he moved to Hawaii and painted local subjects.

== Early life ==
Born James Pringle Wittlig in Marietta, Ohio, he was the son of Walter Wittlig, a watchmaker, and Florence Ione Pringle. He had two brothers, Laurence and David. The Wittligs had emigrated from Langenthal, Switzerland in the 1860s.

However, James did not follow in the family watchmaking tradition. His first love was art, which took him to the Pratt Art Institute of New York where he became a watercolorist and an illustrator for various magazines.

== Film career ==
Warren was seen by an MGM talent scout, who offered him a contract. Changing his name to James Warren, he, his wife Felice, and their six-week-old son moved to Hollywood, where over the course of several years he appeared in more than 30 movies. When his MGM contract expired, he moved to RKO Radio Pictures.

His first picture at RKO, filmed in the spring of 1945, was Ding Dong Williams, a backstage musical with a Hollywood theme. He played a slow-witted movie cowboy alongside a palomino horse, Star Dust. RKO had been making Zane Grey westerns with Robert Mitchum in the leading roles, and with Mitchum now advancing to dramatic features, RKO producer Herman Schlom (who had made Ding Dong Williams) remembered how well James Warren photographed in western gear. James Warren (and Star Dust) took over RKO's Zane Grey series, starring in three films: Wanderer of the Wasteland (1945), Sunset Pass (1946), and Code of the West (1947).

Warren's tenure as RKO's cowboy star was brief; the studio's resident star Tim Holt returned from military service and resumed his starring series. Warren returned to character roles. In 1952, he co-starred with Gloria Swanson in the comedy film Three for Bedroom "C". Swanson wrote in her autobiography that she chose him as the male lead in the play after seeing him in Los Angeles selling his paintings and ceramics.

== Art career ==
During all his time in Hollywood, Warren had never lost his passion for painting. He produced several one-man shows throughout the US and found a patron in Vincent Price. At one of these shows, Katharine Hepburn purchased seven of Warren's large watercolor paintings which she kept in her private collection.

In 1968, an art commission from Ford Motor Company took him to Hawaii. There, he quickly settled into island life and became a highly respected member of the art community. He maintained an art gallery in Honolulu, as well as Maui. Warren specialized in whimsical interpretations of the Hawaiian tutus (grandmothers) as well as paintings of Maui onions. Warren was a well-respected member of the Lahaina Art Society. He was usually a willing and gracious participant in all art shows. He continued his one-man shows well into his later life, only stopping in his seventies.

Warren died in 2001, aged 88, in Kihei, Hawaii, leaving four children and several grandchildren.

== Filmography ==
Year	Title	Role	Notes
1942	Ship Ahoy	Ship's Officer	Uncredited
1942	Pacific Rendezvous	FBI Agent	Uncredited
1942	Seven Sweethearts	Theodore Vaney, Albert's Beau	
1942	Tennessee Johnson	James Patterson	Uncredited
1943	The Human Comedy	Soldier	Uncredited
1943	Slightly Dangerous	Young Dancer	Uncredited
1943	Three Hearts for Julia	Program Vendor	Uncredited
1943	Swing Shift Maisie	Young Pilot	Uncredited
1943	Thousands Cheer	Soldier at Train Station	Uncredited
1943	Cry 'Havoc'	Wounded Soldier Beside Truck	Uncredited
1943	Girl Crazy	Radio Man	Uncredited
1943	A Guy Named Joe	Irish Guard	Uncredited
1943	Whistling in Brooklyn	Sound Man	Uncredited
1944	See Here, Private Hargrove	Executive Officer	Uncredited
1944	Meet the People	Marine	Uncredited
1944	Maisie Goes to Reno	Dr. Hanley Fleeson	Uncredited
1944	Marriage Is a Private Affair	Officer	Uncredited
1945	This Man's Navy	Bomber Pilot	Uncredited
1945	Main Street After Dark	Serviceman in Police Station	Uncredited
1945	Wanderer of the Wasteland	Adam Laney	
1945	Ding Dong Williams	Steve Moore	
1946	Badman's Territory	John Rowley	
1946	Sunset Pass	Rocky	
1947	Code of the West	Bob Wade	
1948	The Judge Steps Out	John Struthers III	
1951	Fourteen Hours	Thomas Edward Fuller	Uncredited
1952	Diplomatic Courier	Cafe Customer	Uncredited
1952	Three for Bedroom C	Professor Ollie J. Thruman	
1953	Port Sinister	Tony Ferris	
